= Magapit Protected Landscape =

Protected area in Cagayan, Philippines

- IUCN category V (protected landscape/seascape)
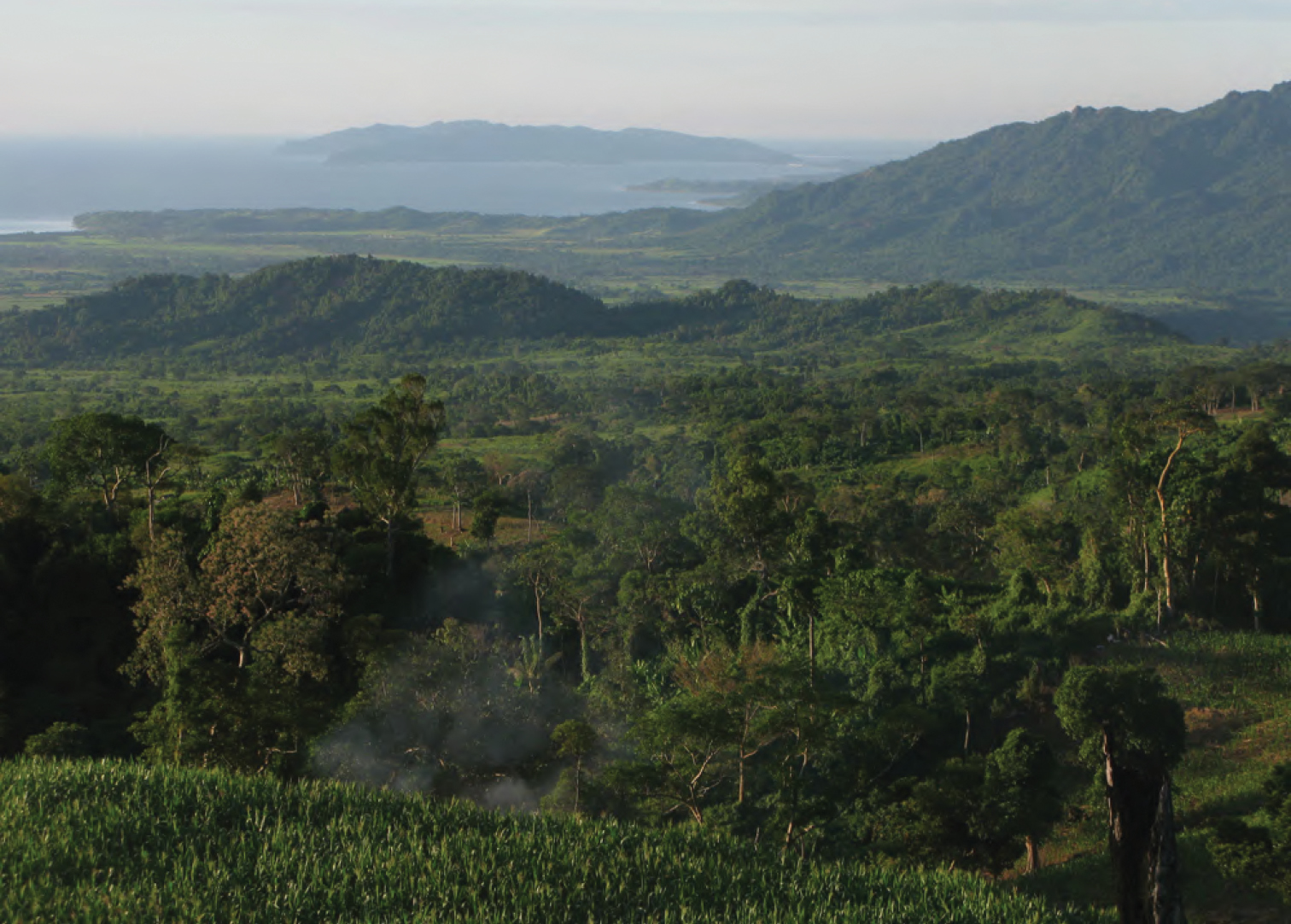
- The Northeastern Cagayan Key Biodiversity Area includes the Magapit Protected Landscape

- Location within Philippines
- Location: Cagayan, Philippines
- Nearest city: Tuguegarao
- Coordinates: 18°12′05″N 121°39′50″E
- Area: 3,403.62 hectares (8,410.5 acres)
- Established: August 15, 1947 (Faunal reserve); April 23, 2000 (Protected landscape)
- Governing body: Department of Environment and Natural Resources

The Magapit Protected Landscape is a protected area of forested limestone hills and grasslands in the Cagayan Valley of northern Luzon island in the Philippines. It covers an area of 3,403.62 hectares (8,410.5 acres) in northeastern Cagayan province straddling the municipalities of Lal-lo and Gattaran. The park was established as a game refuge and bird sanctuary on 15 August 1947 covering an initial area of 4,554 hectares (11,250 acres) declared through Administrative Order No. 10 by President Manuel Roxas. On 23 April 2000, the park was redesignated as a protected landscape area under the National Integrated Protected Areas System Act through Proclamation No. 285 signed by President Joseph Estrada. The park is a component of the Northeastern Cagayan Key Biodiversity Area and also contains the Lal-lo and Gattaran Shell Middens, a proposed World Heritage Site.

== Description ==
The Magapit Protected Landscape area sits on the foothills of the northern Sierra Madre mountain range, on the east bank of the Rio Grande de Cagayan between the villages of Magapit in Lal-lo and Nassiping in Gattaran. It is one of five protected areas in the province of Cagayan and forms part of the 183,430-hectare (453,300-acre) forest area called Northeastern Cagayan Key Biodiversity Area, a declared important bird area that also includes nearby Mount Cagua, Mount Cetaceo and the Buguey wetlands in the adjacent municipalities of Buguey, Gonzaga, Baggao and Santa Teresita. The park is characterized by open grasslands and lowland evergreen forests on limestone hills at elevations between 200 metres (660 ft) and 800 metres (2,600 ft) above sea level. It is drained by several streams including the Magapit, Nassiping and Dummun rivers which empty into the Rio Grande de Cagayan.

The park is located some 80 kilometres (50 mi) north of Tuguegarao, Cagayan's capital and largest city and some 9 kilometres (5.6 mi) south of San Mariano, Lal-lo where the Northern Cagayan International Airport is being constructed. It is accessible via the Santa Ana Road from the Port of San Vicente in Santa Ana in the north and from the Pan-Philippine Highway (AH26) from the west through the Magapit Suspension Bridge.

== Wildlife ==
Magapit is an important bird area having been initially established as the Magapit Game Refuge and Bird Sanctuary. Its hilly landscape provides a habitat for diverse bird species such as swifts, hornbill, white-breasted sea eagle, amethyst brown dove, fantails, wagtails, sunbirds, herons, egrets, plovers, Philippine duck, bee-eaters, Philippine bulbul, and yellow-vented bulbul.

The open grasslands are dominated by cogon grass and talahib. In the forested hills grow dipterocarp trees such as tanguile (Shorea polysperma), white lauan (Shorea pentacme), red lauan (Shorea negrosensis), palosapis (Anisoptera thurifera), mayapis (Hopea palosapis), apitong (Dipterocarpus grandiflorus), guijo (Shorea guiso), dalingdingan (Hopea foxworthyi), and natural stand of narek (Hopea cagayanensis). Other plant species found in the area are akleng parang (Albizia sp.), hagonoy (Chromolaena odorata) group, carabao grass, and the Malvaceae group.

== See also ==
- Peñablanca Protected Landscape and Seascape
- Palaui Island
