= Tüləkəran =

Tüləkəran or Tyulekiran or Tyulyakeran may refer to:

- Aşağı Tüləkəran, Azerbaijan
- Yuxarı Tüləkəran, Azerbaijan
