= Tyuler =

Tyuler may refer to:

- Aşağı Tüləkəran, Azerbaijan
- Tülər, Azerbaijan
