= Lal-lo and Gattaran Shell Middens =

Archaeological site in Cagayan, Philippines

Lal-lo and Gattaran Neolithic Shell Midden Sites
- Location of Lal-lo and Gattaran Shell Midden in the Philippines
- 18°12′05″N 121°39′50″E
- Type: Shell midden
- Periods: Neolithic Period
- Location: Cagayan River, Cagayan

Site notes
- Material: Batissa childreni
- Management: National Museum of the Philippines

The Lal-lo and Gattaran Shell Middens are one of the most significant archaeological gastronomic finds in Southeast Asia in the 20th century. The site is located along the banks of the Cagayan River in the province of Cagayan, Philippines. The site, as old as 2000 BC, is highly important due to its archaeological impact on the food resources and human activities of the ancient peoples of the Cagayan Valley. It is currently under consideration as a UNESCO World Heritage Site.

== Description ==
Roughly 500 km northeast of Manila, various shell middens can be found that consist of shells of the predominant species Batissa childreni, a freshwater clam, in highest abundance. The middens are of various sizes and ages with the oldest being carbon dated to 2000 BC and youngest to 100 AD. They reside on nearby hilltops and also on the immediate banks of the Cagayan River. The largest deposits of shells can be found in Magapit and Bangag in Lal-lo while the thickest shell midden is more than six feet.

Near many of the middens have been found stone implements, bones, teeth, and intricately designed pottery

== Declaration ==
This site was added to the UNESCO World Heritage Tentative List on May 16, 2006, in the Cultural category.

== See also ==
- Magapit Protected Landscape
