= Cagayan Special Economic Zone =

Special economic zone in Cagayan, Philippines

Coordinates: 18°22′30″N 122°06′30″E

Cagayan Economic Zone Authority
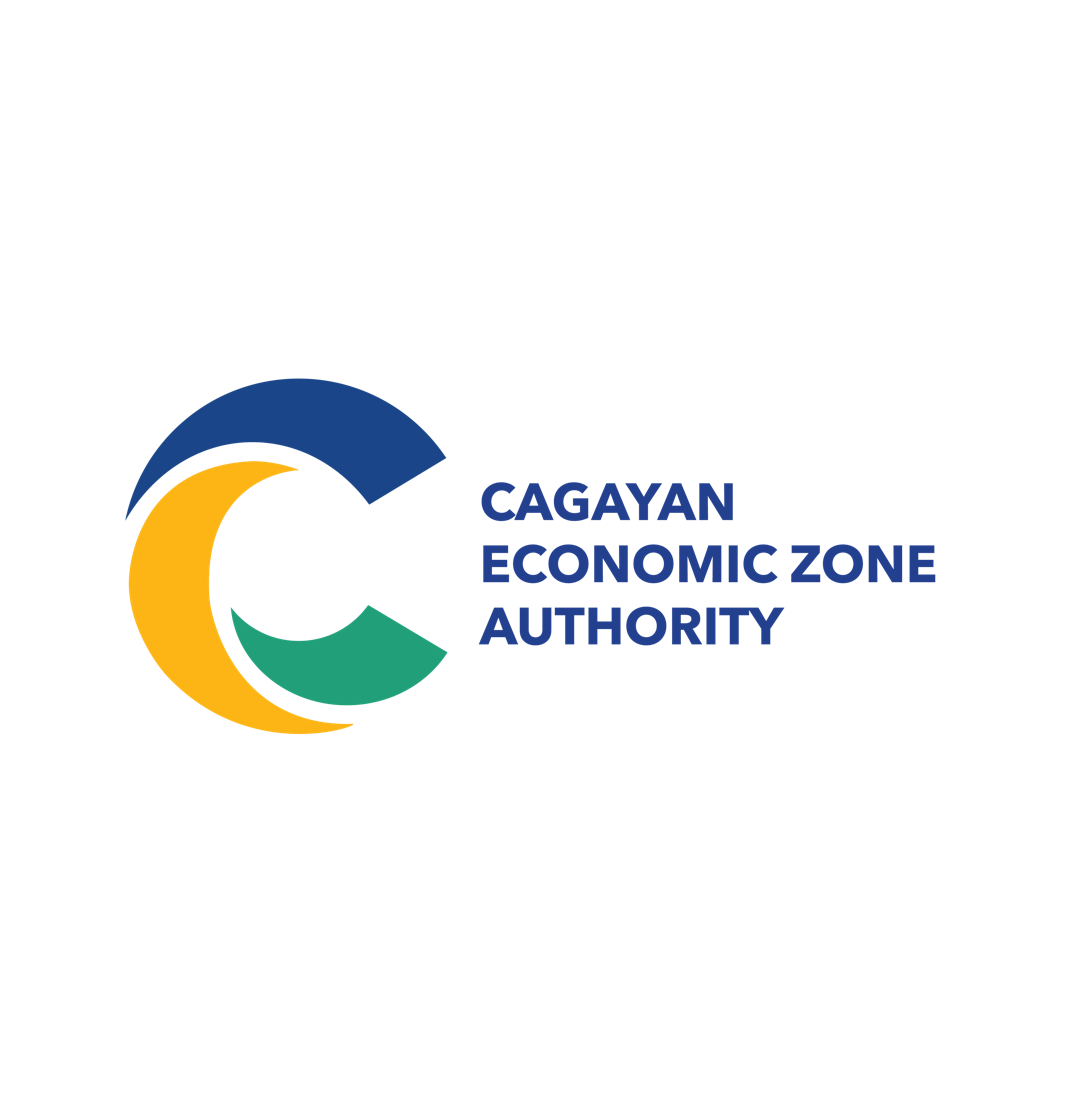

Agency overview
- Formed: February 24, 1995; 31 years ago
- Type: Special economic zone
- Headquarters: 10th Floor, Ayala Triangle Gardens Tower 2, Paseo de Roxas, corner Makati Ave, Makati, Philippines
- Agency executives: Cristina Aldeguer-Roque, DTI, Chairperson of the Board; Katrina Ponce Enrile, Administrator and CEO
- Parent agency: Office of the President of the Philippines
- Website: www.ceza.gov.ph

The Cagayan Economic Zone Authority (CEZA; Filipino: Pangasiwaan sa Sonang Pangkabuhayan ng Cagayan) is a government-owned and controlled corporation (GOCC) responsible for managing and supervising the development of the Cagayan Special Economic Zone and Freeport (CSEZFP) in the Philippines.

Its creation and operations are mandated by Republic Act No. 7922, also known as the "Cagayan Special Economic Zone Act of 1995," which was signed into law by President Fidel V. Ramos. The act was authored by Senator Juan Ponce Enrile, a native of Gonzaga, Cagayan. CEZA was the first economic zone in the Philippines to host financial technology companies, having issued the first batch of Financial Technology Solutions and Offshore Virtual Currency (FTSOVC) certificates to three locators.

== Overview ==
The Cagayan Special Economic Zone and Freeport, also known as Cagayan Freeport, is a special economic zone in Cagayan Province, northern Luzon, in the Philippines. It is envisioned to be a self-sustaining industrial, commercial, financial, tourism, and recreational center, in order to effectively encourage and attract legitimate and productive local and foreign investments and eventually create employment opportunities and increase income and productivity in the rural areas around Freeport Zone. The Cagayan Special Economic Zone also serves as one of the main gambling jurisdictions in the Philippines.

CEZA is headed by Secretary Katrina Ponce Enrile as Administrator and Chief Executive Officer.

== Location ==
Spatially, the Cagayan Economic Zone & Freeport covers the entire Municipality of Sta. Ana, including the Islands of Fuga, Barit, and Mabbag in the Municipality of Aparri in the Province of Cagayan. Approximately 54,118 hectares of land for prime development fall within the jurisdiction of CEZA. It is surrounded by the waters of Babuyan Channel and the South China Sea on the North and the Pacific Ocean in the east.
