= Lal-lo Church =

Roman Catholic church in Cagayan, Philippines

- Saint Dominic de Guzman Parish Church
- Santo Domingo de Guzman Parish Church
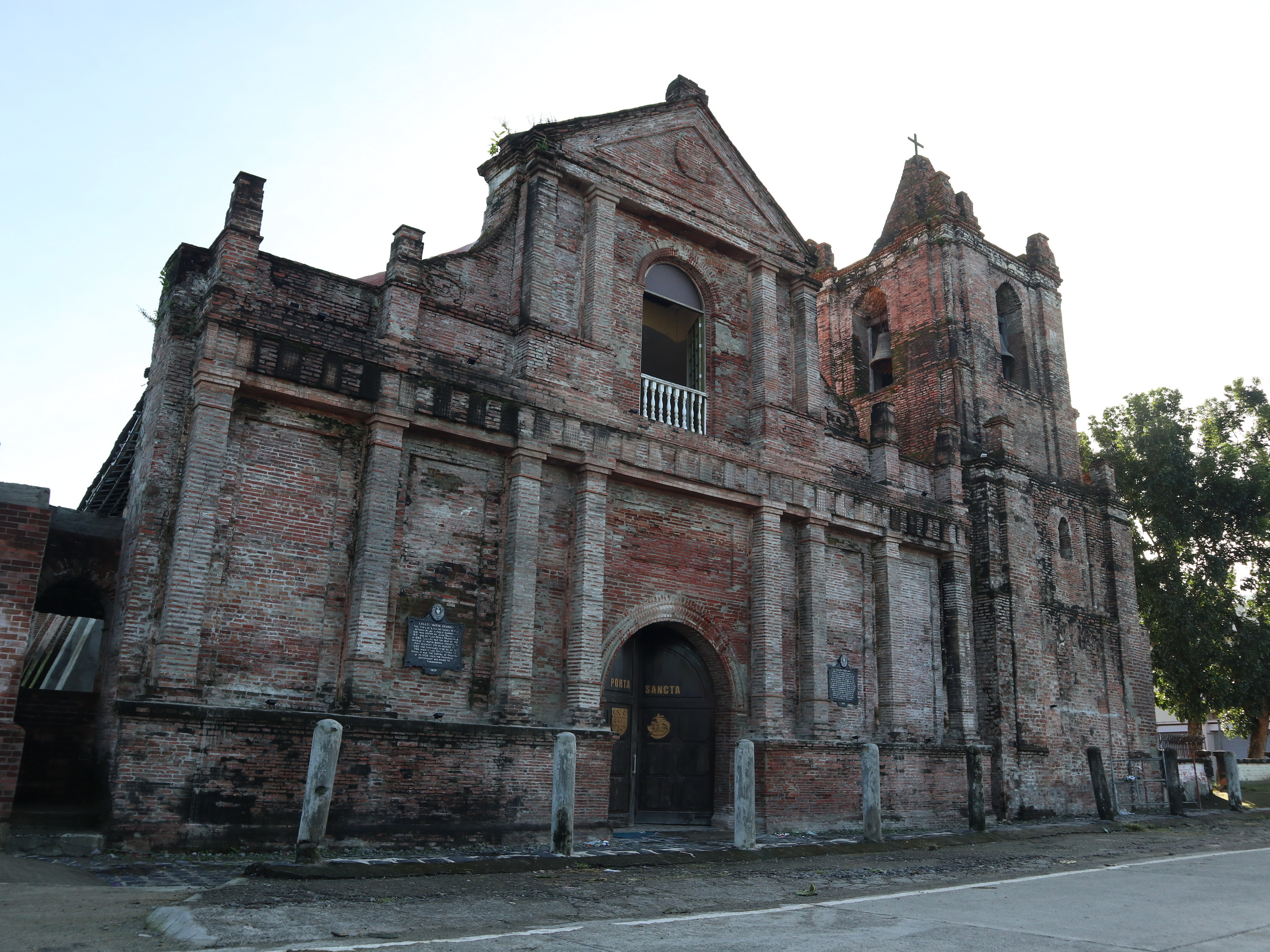
- Church facade in 2022

- Location in Luzon Location in the Philippines
- 18°11′58.06″N 121°39′41.54″E
- Location: Lal-lo, Cagayan
- Country: Philippines
- Denomination: Roman Catholic

History
- Status: Parish church
- Founded: 1596; 430 years ago
- Dedication: Saint Dominic

Architecture
- Functional status: Active
- Heritage designation: National Historical Landmark
- Designated: 1939
- Architectural type: Church building

Administration
- Archdiocese: Tuguegarao

Saint Dominic de Guzman Parish Church, commonly known as Lal-lo Church, is a Roman Catholic church located in Lal-lo, Cagayan, Philippines. It is under the jurisdiction of the Archdiocese of Tuguegarao. The church was built by the Dominican priests in 1596. The facade, with neo-Renaissance style, may have been applied as part of the renovation of the church after a storm in 1845. The National Historical Commission of the Philippines (NHCP) declared it a national landmark and installed a historical marker on the church's facade in 1939.

== Gallery ==
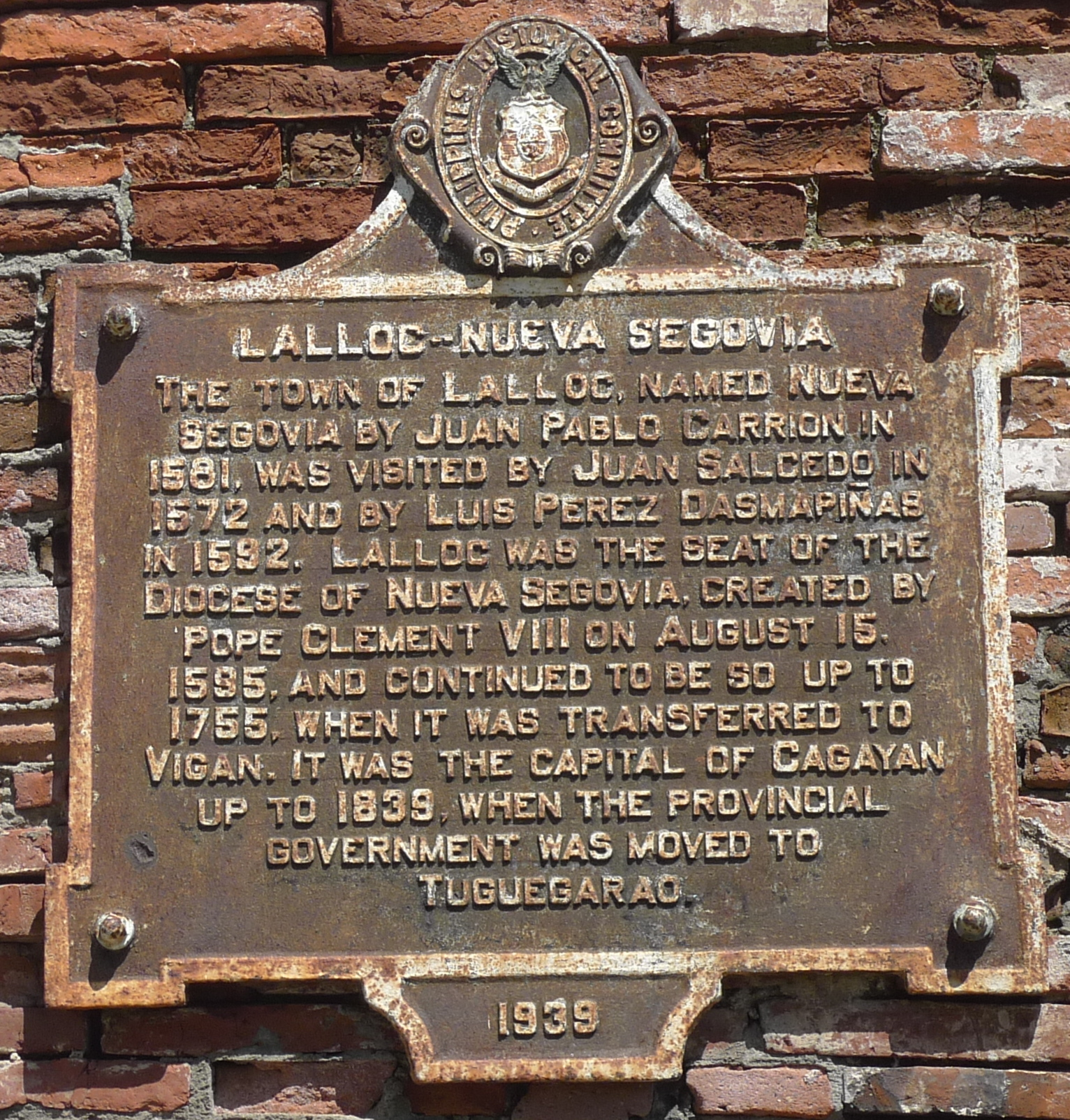
Church PHC historical marker installed in 1939

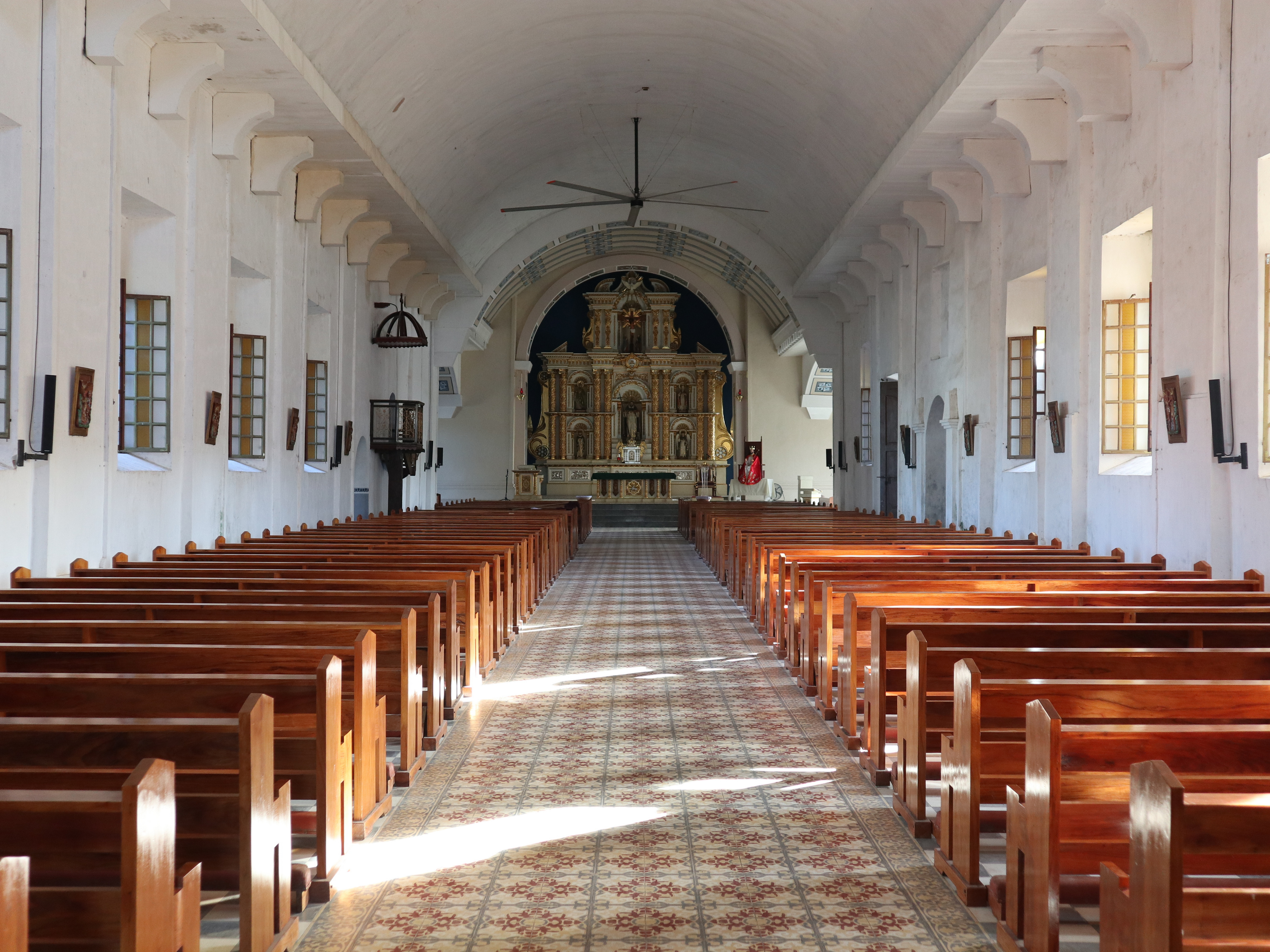
Church interior in 2022

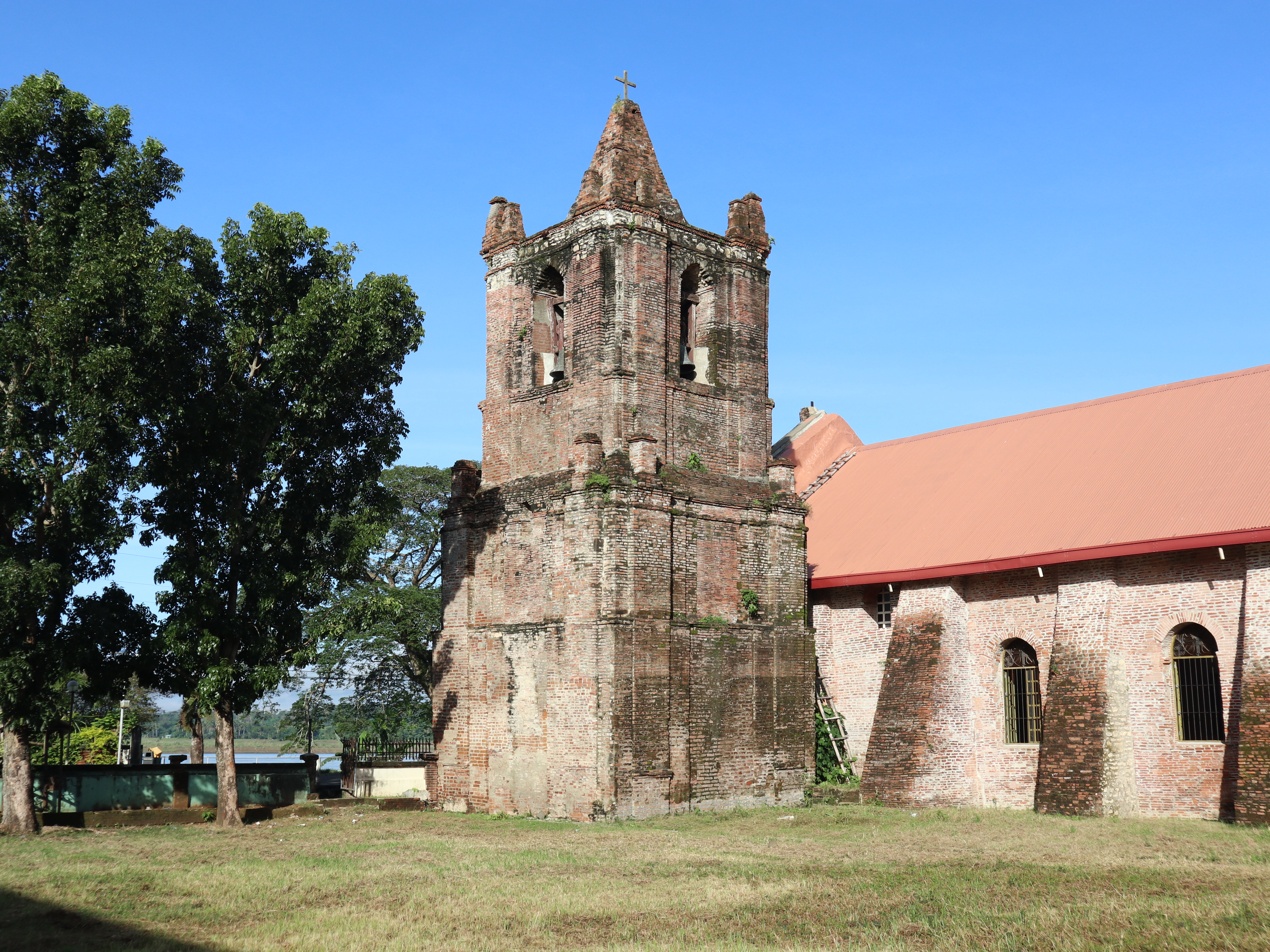
Church bell tower in 2022
