= Lafu Island =

River island in the Philippines

Geography
- Location: Cagayan River
- Coordinates: 18°10′59″N 121°38′29″E

Administration
- Philippines
- Region: Cagayan Valley
- Province: Cagayan
- Municipality: Lal-lo

Demographics
- Population: 805 (2020)

Lafu Island, also known as San Antonio Island, is a small island–barangay situated on the Rio Grande de Cagayan in northern Luzon, Philippines. It is administratively part of the municipality of Lal-lo in Cagayan province and is coterminous with the rural village of San Antonio.

According to the 2020 census, it has a population of 805 people. It is located south of Fabrica, east of Malanao and Catugan, and west of Tucalana and Catayuan. The Magapit Suspension Bridge can be found some two kilometers south of the island.
