= Cagua Volcano =

Volcano on the island of Luzon, Philippines

- Kagwa Volcano
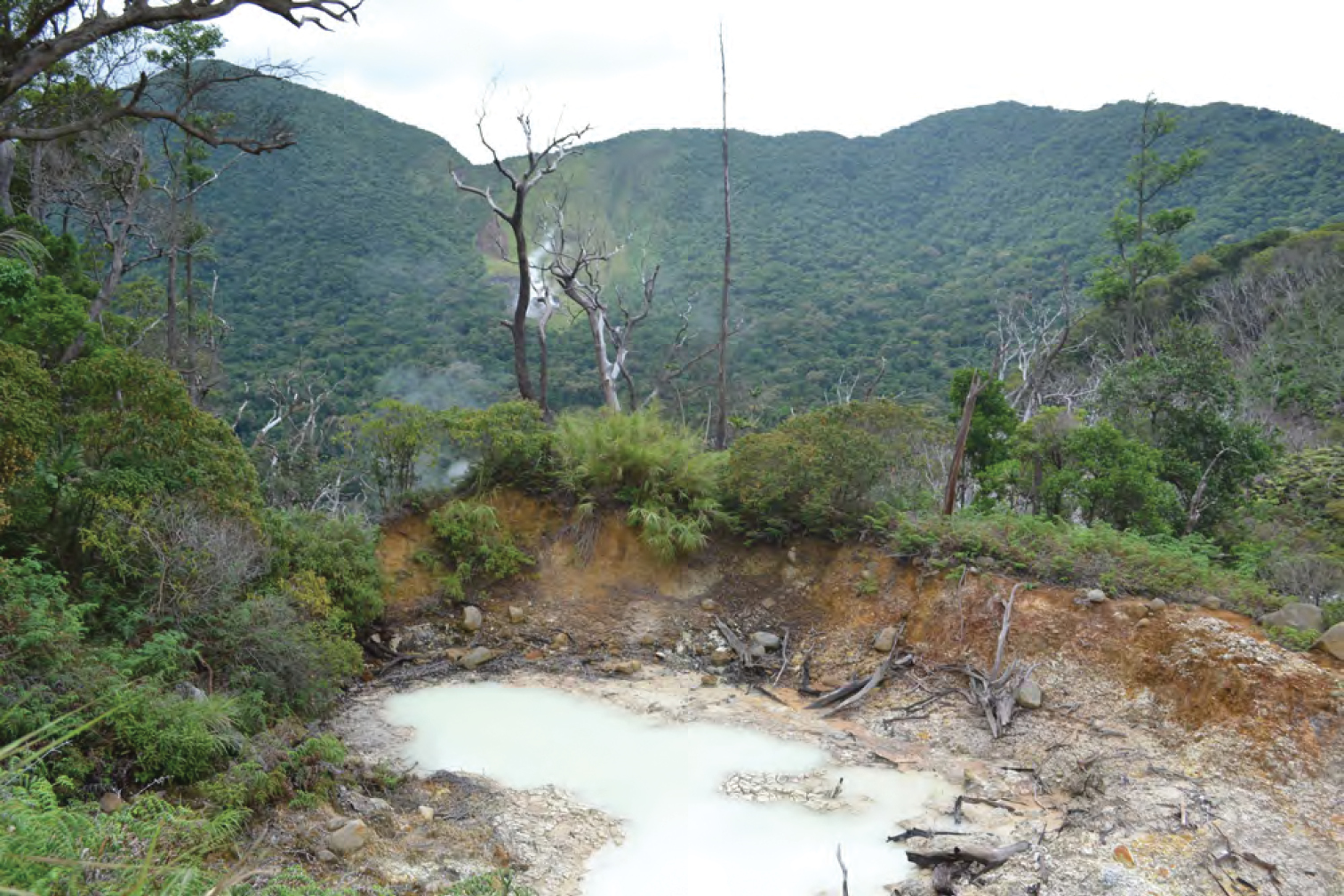
- Volcanic vent on the floor of the Cagua crater

Highest point
- Elevation: 1,133 m (3,717 ft)
- Listing: Active volcanoes in the Philippines
- Coordinates: 18°13′18″N 122°07′24″E

Geography
- Location within Luzon Location within Philippines
- Country: Philippines
- Region: Cagayan Valley
- Province: Cagayan
- City/municipality: Gonzaga
- Parent range: Sierra Madre

Geology
- Rock age: Pleistocene
- Mountain type: Stratovolcano
- Volcanic arc: Babuyan (Bashi) Segment of Luzon-Taiwan Arc
- Last eruption: October 1907

Cagua Volcano (IPA: [ˈk̠aː.wɐ]), is a stratovolcano located in the Philippine province of Cagayan. It is one of the active volcanoes in the Philippines and has erupted twice in recorded history. Its last eruption was in 1907.

== Geography ==
Cagua is one of the active volcanoes in the Philippines located in the province of Cagayan in the Cagayan Valley Region of northern Luzon in the northernmost part of the Sierra Madre mountain range. The mountain is approximately 12 kilometres (7.5 mi) south of Gonzaga, Cagayan and 14 kilometres (8.7 mi) south of Port Irene in Santa Ana, Cagayan.

== Geology ==
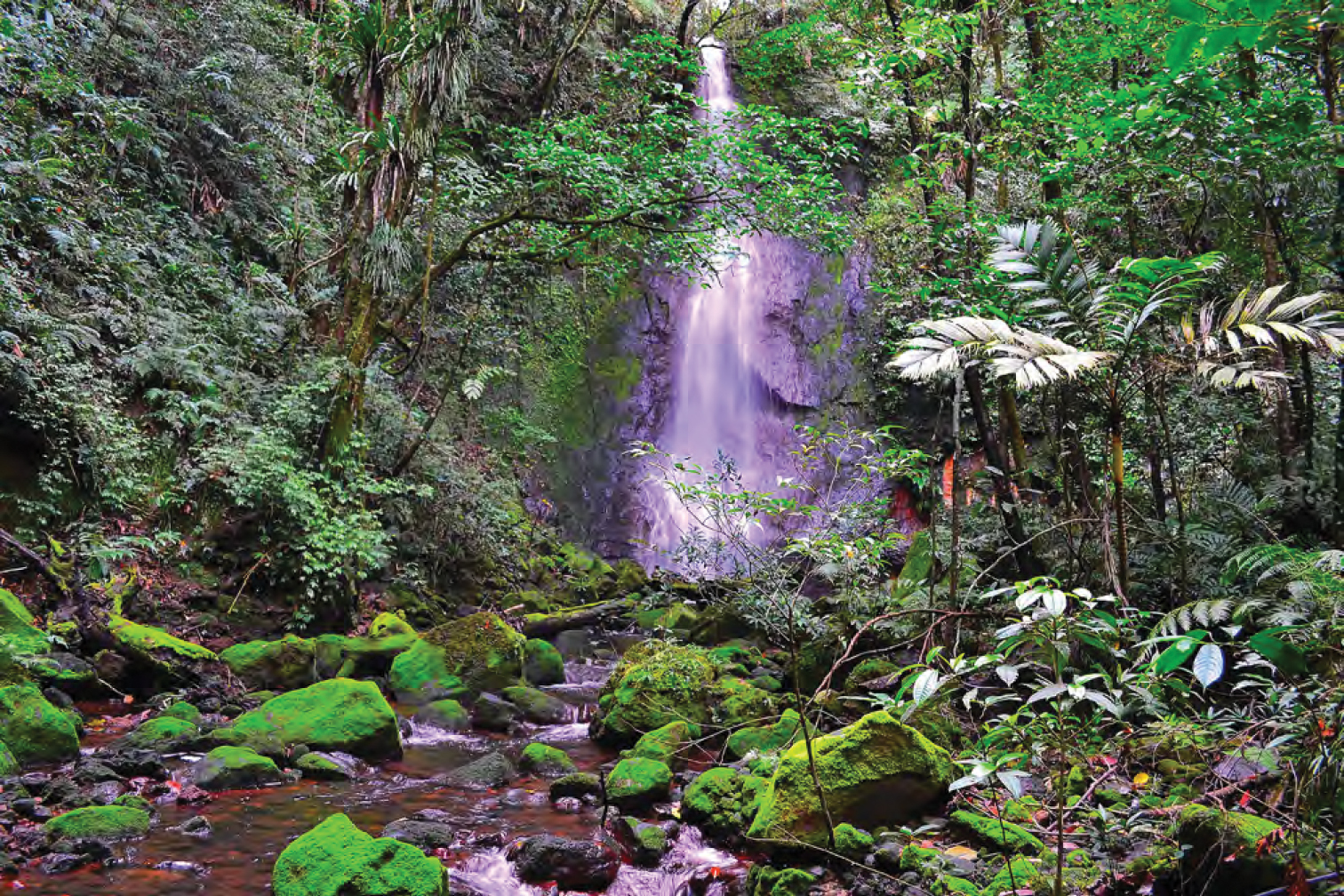
A waterfall in the crater floor

Activity of the early Pleistocene erupted basaltic andesite or effusive basalt. The volcano was covered by enormous lava flows from 600,000 to 300,000 years ago. It has seen activity ranging from phreatic eruptions to ash flows. The volcano is topped by a 1.5-kilometer (1 mi) wide crater marked by sharp and precipitous walls.

It has six hot springs. Maasok near the crater; Marafil in the northwest; Manaring, 5 kilometres (3.1 mi) north-northeast; San Jose, 10 km (6.2 mi) north-northeast; Kabinlangan, 3 km (1.9 mi) northwest and Paminta, 2 km (1.2 mi) north-northwest.

== Eruptive activity ==
Two historical eruptions have taken place at the volcano. Activity in 1860 was a largely phreatic eruption though it was possibly followed by a pyroclastic flow. Renewed eruptions took place in October 1907 .

== See also ==
- List of volcanoes in the Philippines
  - List of active volcanoes in the Philippines
  - List of potentially active volcanoes in the Philippines
  - List of inactive volcanoes in the Philippines
- Philippine Institute of Volcanology and Seismology
