= Seal of Cagayan =

Seal of Cagayán
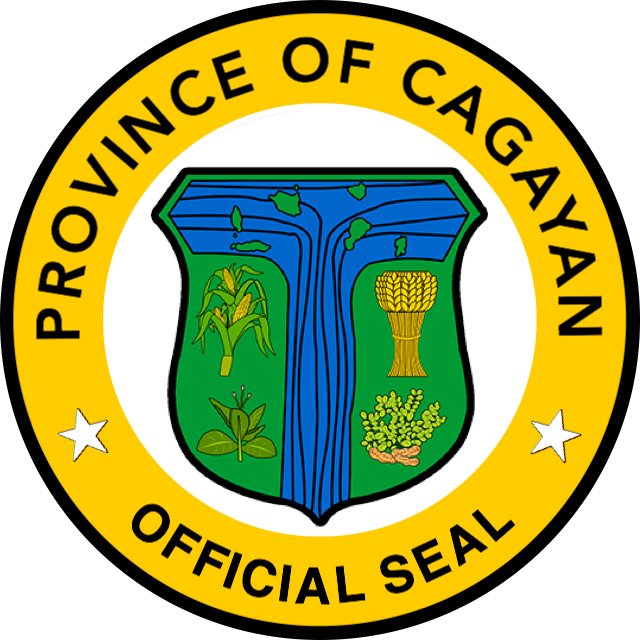
- Armiger: Cagayan
- Adopted: 1917
- Motto: Province of Cagayan

The Seal of Cagayan is the official seal of the Philippine province of Cagayan. The seal was adopted in 1917.

== Description ==
The yellow and gold color portion of the seal symbolizes the wealth of the province. The blue color represents justice, honor, nobility of the people, their sincerity and traditional peaceful ways. The blue portion of shield resembling a chief combined with a pale represents the Cagayan River with the two divided portions representing the two original congressional districts of Cagayan. The small islands on the top portion of the shield represent the islands found on the northern part of the province. The major agricultural crops of Cagayan such as tobacco, rice, corn and peanuts are represented by the plant facsimile.
