= Gonzaga, Cagayan =

Municipality in Cagayan, Philippines

Gonzaga
- Municipality
- Municipality of Gonzaga
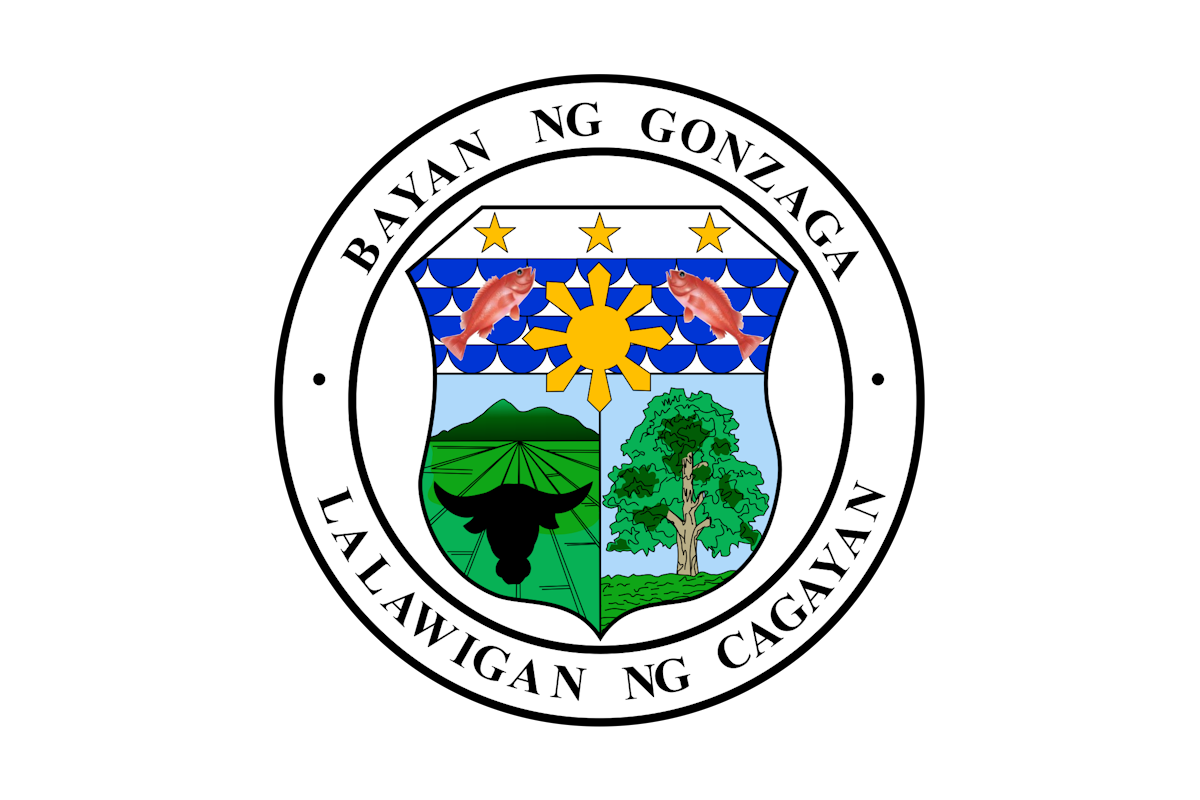
- Flag Seal

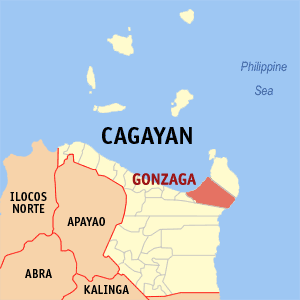
- Map of Cagayan with Gonzaga highlighted
- Interactive map of Gonzaga
- Location within the Philippines
- Coordinates: 18°15′41″N 121°59′49″E
- Country: Philippines
- Region: Cagayan Valley
- Province: Cagayan
- District: 1st district
- Named for: Gracio P. Gonzaga
- Barangays: 25 (see Barangays)

Government
  - Type: Sangguniang Bayan
  - Mayor: Engr. Rellie S. Dalmaceda, ASEAN Engr.
  - Vice Mayor: Sherryl Anne C. Gaspar
  - Representative: Ramon C. Nolasco Jr.
  - Electorate: 27,767 voters (2025)

Area
  - Total: 567.43 km^{2} (219.09 sq mi)
- Elevation: 42 m (138 ft)
- Highest elevation: 249 m (817 ft)
- Lowest elevation: 0 m (0 ft)

Population (2024 census)
  - Total: 41,994
  - Density: 74.007/km^{2} (191.68/sq mi)
  - Households: 9,685

Economy
  - Income class: 1st municipal income class
  - Poverty incidence: 8.04% (2023)
  - Revenue: ₱ 315.9 million (2024)
  - Assets: ₱ 703.4 million (2024)
  - Expenditure: ₱ 275.1 million (2024)
  - Liabilities: ₱ 117.6 million (2024)

Service provider
  - Electricity: Cagayan 2 Electric Cooperative (CAGELCO 2)
  - Water: Gonzaga Water District
- Time zone: UTC+8 (PST)
- ZIP code: 3513
- PSGC: 0201514000
- IDD : area code: +63 (0)78
- Native languages: Ibanag; Ilocano; Dupaningan Agta; Tagalog

Gonzaga, officially the Municipality of Gonzaga (Ilocano: Ili ti Gonzaga; Tagalog: Bayan ng Gonzaga), is a municipality located in the province of Cagayan, Philippines. According to the 2024 census, it has a population of 41,994.

== History ==
=== Pre-Colonial Period and Etymology ===
The earliest known inhabitants of Gonzaga were Negrito peoples, particularly Aeta tribes. The area was originally known as Gampao, an Aeta term meaning “mountainous.” This name was later changed to Wangag, meaning “river.”

=== Spanish Era ===
During the eighteenth century, groups of Ilocano-speaking migrants arrived in several waves by both sea and land, gradually displacing the Aeta from the lowland areas.

Wangag received ecclesiastical recognition on February 23, 1869, when it was established as a barrio of Buguey. In 1917, the American-controlled Insular Government renamed the settlement Rumang-ay (Ilocano for “to be progressive”). The following year, it was renamed Gonzaga, in honor of Gracio P. Gonzaga, the first Filipino governor of Cagayan. The town was officially separated from Buguey on January 1, 1918, through an Executive Order issued by Governor-General Francis Burton Harrison.

=== World War II ===
Days after the Imperial Japanese attack on Pearl Harbor, the Tanaka Detachment sailed south from Japanese Formosa as part of the main invasion force against the American-held Commonwealth of the Philippines. On December 10, 1941, Japanese forces landed along the northern coasts of Luzon, including Gonzaga, marking the outbreak of the Pacific War in the Philippines.

== The Golden Era of Gonzaga ==
=== Foundations of Planned Development, Infrastructure, Public Service and Community Progress ===
The administration of Mayor Francisco Tacuycuy Baclig (1968–1986), the longest-serving mayor in the history of Gonzaga, is regarded in local accounts as a "golden era" in the municipality's development. His leadership was marked by coordinated advancements in urban planning, infrastructure, agriculture, education, public utilities, and community services.

One of the defining achievements of this period was the establishment of a planned and highly structured street-block system in the poblacion area, particularly in the barangays of Flourishing, Smart, Paradise, and Progressive. This organized layout was made possible through the active participation of local families, many of whom voluntarily contributed portions of their land to help create a coherent and systematic block design.

Major infrastructure projects were also undertaken during this administration. Among these were the construction of important bridges, including Pateng Bridge, built in the early 1980s, and Baua Bridge. Road networks were likewise improved through the concreting of major roads, which enhanced accessibility and connectivity within the municipality. These improvements supported the movement of people, goods, and agricultural products, thereby contributing to local economic activity.

In the agricultural sector, irrigation systems were developed to provide wider access to water for rice fields and to improve agricultural productivity. Complementing these efforts was the establishment of a dam structure in Tabbug, which helped mitigate flooding in the lower-lying areas of Gonzaga.

Public utility services were expanded through the creation of the Gonzaga Water District, which enabled the distribution of potable water to households across the municipality. In addition, barangay halls were established in all 25 barangays, strengthening local governance and improving the delivery of community services.

Education also advanced during this period. Elementary schools were expanded and established in most barangays, making basic education more accessible to children, including those living in remote areas. This development was further strengthened by the transition of the Gonzaga National Agricultural and Technological School into what is now part of Cagayan State University in 1978, expanding access to higher education within the municipality.

Cultural and religious traditions were likewise sustained and strengthened, particularly the annual town fiesta in honor of Saint Roch, or San Roque, the patron saint of Gonzaga. This celebration continued to serve as a focal point of community life, religious devotion, and local identity.

Together, these initiatives form a significant part of the developmental legacy attributed to Mayor Francisco T. Baclig. His administration laid important foundations for Gonzaga’s organized growth and remains remembered as a period of substantial progress in the municipality’s history.

== Geography ==
Gonzaga is located in the northeastern part of Cagayan. It is bordered by Santa Ana to the northeast, Santa Teresita to the west, and Lal-lo to the south.

The municipality lies approximately 123 kilometers (76 miles) from Tuguegarao, 604 kilometers (375 miles) from Manila, and 11 kilometers (6.8 miles) from Santa Teresita.

Gonzaga has a total land area of 56,743 hectares (140,220 acres), most of which remains undeveloped. Large portions of the municipality are covered by virgin forests, particularly in the mountainous areas of the Sierra Madre mountain range. Its highest point is Mount Cagua in Barangay Magrafil, which rises to 1,130 meters (3,710 feet) above sea level.

The municipality has a coastline stretching approximately 40 kilometers (25 miles), largely facing the Babuyan Channel to the north, while its southeastern boundary is influenced by the Pacific Ocean. The eleven coastal barangays encompass a combined total of 139 hectares (340 acres) of beaches, 69 hectares (170 acres) of mangrove forests, and 348 hectares (860 acres) of coral reefs.

=== Barangays ===
Gonzaga is politically subdivided into 25 barangays, including four urban barangays that make up the poblacion area. Each barangay is further divided into puroks, with some also containing sitios.

- Amunitan
- Batangan
- Baua
- Cabanbanan Norte
- Cabanbanan Sur
- Cabiraoan
- Callao
- Calayan
- Caroan
- Casitan
- Flourishing (Poblacion)
- Ipil
- Isca
- Magrafil
- Minanga
- Rebecca (Nagbabacalan)
- Paradise (Poblacion)
- Pateng
- Progressive (Poblacion)
- San Jose
- Santa Clara
- Santa Cruz
- Santa Maria
- Smart (Poblacion)
- Tapel

=== Climate ===
Climate data for Gonzaga, Cagayan
Month	Jan	Feb	Mar	Apr	May	Jun	Jul	Aug	Sep	Oct	Nov	Dec	Year
Mean daily maximum °C (°F)	24 (75)	25 (77)	28 (82)	31 (88)	31 (88)	31 (88)	30 (86)	30 (86)	29 (84)	28 (82)	26 (79)	24 (75)	28 (83)
Mean daily minimum °C (°F)	20 (68)	20 (68)	21 (70)	23 (73)	24 (75)	24 (75)	24 (75)	24 (75)	24 (75)	23 (73)	23 (73)	21 (70)	23 (73)
Average precipitation mm (inches)	150 (5.9)	106 (4.2)	84 (3.3)	48 (1.9)	103 (4.1)	115 (4.5)	134 (5.3)	156 (6.1)	136 (5.4)	240 (9.4)	246 (9.7)	300 (11.8)	1,818 (71.6)
Average rainy days	19	14.3	12.8	10.8	17.7	18.9	21.5	23.3	22.1	20.4	20.3	22.2	223.3
Source: Meteoblue

== Demographics ==
Population census of Gonzaga
Year	Pop.	±% p.a.
1918	3,339	—
1939	8,682	+4.66%
1948	10,811	+2.47%
1960	12,519	+1.23%
1970	17,686	+3.51%
1975	19,316	+1.78%
1980	22,467	+3.07%
1990	26,536	+1.68%
1995	27,997	+1.01%
2000	32,079	+2.96%
2007	35,424	+1.38%
2010	36,303	+0.90%
2015	38,892	+1.32%
2020	41,680	+1.47%
2024	41,994	+0.18%
Source: Philippine Statistics Authority

According to the 2024 census, Gonzaga had a population of 41,994, with a population density of 74 inhabitants per square kilometer (190 per square mile).

== Economy ==
Poverty incidence of Gonzaga (%)

Source: Philippine Statistics Authority

Gonzaga is primarily an agricultural municipality, with more than half of its workforce employed as farmers or fishers. Approximately 5,500 hectares (14,000 acres) of agricultural land are currently under production, most of which is devoted to rice farming.

== Government ==
=== Local government ===
Gonzaga is part of the first legislative district of the province of Cagayan. It is governed by a mayor, designated as its local chief executive, and by a municipal council as its legislative body in accordance with the Local Government Code. The mayor, vice mayor and councillors are directly elected by constituents in polls held every three years.

=== Elected officials ===
Members of the Municipal Council (2025–2028)
Position	Name
Congressman	Ramon C. Nolasco
Mayor	Rellie S. Dalmaceda
Vice-Mayor	Sherryl Anne C. Gaspar
Councillors	Quirino S. Jara
Councillors	Oscar G.Idmilao
Councillors	Ferdinand L.Baclig
Councillors	Atty. Jun Alibania
Councillors	Jayson Joe Castillo
Councillors	Cecilia G. Morales
Councillors	Orlando B. Rasos
Councillors	Nanding Solatre

=== Local chief executives ===
Name	Years
Francis Torres	1918-1921
Leandro Zuniega	1922-1924
Teodoro Castro	1925-1927
Francisco Torres	1928-1931
Cesario Peralta	1932–1940, 1945–1946
Frederico Navarro	1941
Cayatano de la Cruz	1942–1945, 1948–1951, 1960–1967
Delfin Baltazar	1952-1955
Claro P. Nuñez	1956-1959
Romarico Salvanera	1967-1968
Francisco Tacuycuy Baclig	1968-1986
Hermogenes T. Baclig	1986-1987
Juan B. Naval	1987
Ricardo M. Paddayuman	1988-1990
Atty. Arsenio P. Gonzales	1990-1998
Epifanio G. Gaspar	1998-2007
Rosendo P. Abad	2007-2010
Engr. Carlito F. Pentecostes, Jr.	2010–2014
Rene Salvanera	2014-2016
Marilyn S. Pentecostes	2016–2025
Engr. Rellie S. Dalmaceda, ASEAN Engr.	2025–present

== In popular culture ==
The 2012 romantic drama film The Mistress, starring John Lloyd Cruz and Bea Alonzo, was partially filmed in the municipality.

== Education ==
=== Primary and elementary schools ===
- Amunitan Elementary School
- Batangan Integrated School
- Baua Central School
- Cabanbanan Norte Elementary School
- Cabanbanan Sur Elementary School
- Cabiraoan Elementary School
- C.Dela Cruz Elementary School
- Calayan Elementary School
- Callao Primary School
- Caroan Elementary School
- Casitan Elementary School
- Gonzaga North Central School
- Gonzaga South Central School
- Isca Elementary School
- Ipil Elementary School
- Laoc Elementary School
- Magrafil Elementary School
- Minanga Elementary School
- Pateng Elementary School
- Rebecca Elementary School
- San Francisco Elementary School
- San Jose Elementary School
- Sta.Cruz Elementary School
- Sta. Clara Elementary School
- Sta.Isabel Elementary School
- Sta.Maria Elementary School
- Tapel Elementary School

=== Secondary schools ===
- Baua National High School
- Cabiraoan National High School
- CFPJ (Carlito F. Pentecostes Jr.) National High School
- Gonzaga National High School
- Ipil National High School
- RJDAMA Christian Academy
- Rebecca National High School
- St. Anthony's Academy

=== Higher educational institutions ===
- Cagayan State University

== Notable personalities ==
- Juan Ponce Enrile, lawyer and politician who served as Secretary of National Defense, Senate President, and Chief Presidential Legal Counsel.
- Lilia Cuntapay, actress
