= Delimondo =

Filipino food processing company

Deli Mondo Food Specialities Inc.
- Trade name: Delimondo
- Type: Private
- Founded: November 13, 2006; 19 years ago
- Founder: Katrina Ponce Enrile
- Headquarters: Jaka Center, San Lorenzo, Makati, Metro Manila, Philippines
- Products: Corned beef, luncheon meat, sausages, pastries, and sauces
- Owner: Katrina Ponce Enrile
- Number of employees: 51 to 200
- Parent: JAKA Group
- Website: www.delimondo.ph

Deli Mondo Food Specialities Inc., doing business as Delimondo, is a Filipino food processing company founded by Katrina Ponce Enrile under the JAKA Group. It was founded on November 13, 2006 after the Enrile family's specialty canned ranch-style corned beef, originally made for personal enjoyment, gained popularity among close friends, leading to its launch as a consumer product.

The company initially sold its products from a stall at the Salcedo Weekend Market located in Salcedo Park in Makati until it expanded to supermarkets around the Philippines, making its initial debut at the S&R Membership Shopping warehouse club chain. A store and café that features Delimondo products was opened in 2017 at its Makati headquarters.

In 2018, a boycott on social media was called on Delimondo's products due to its owner's ties to Juan Ponce Enrile, particularly his role in the Marcos regime. After the 2022 Philippine general election, there were renewed calls to boycott Delimondo due to Juan Ponce Enrile's support for the winning presidential candidate, Bongbong Marcos. In response, Katrina Ponce Enrile defended the company and urged the public not to associate it with her family's politics.
