= Yuxarı Tüləkəran =

- Municipality
- Location within Azerbaijan
- Coordinates: 41°16′N 48°25′E
- Country: Azerbaijan
- Rayon: Quba

Population
  - Total: 421
- Time zone: UTC+4 (AZT)
  - Summer (DST): UTC+5 (AZT)

Yuxarı Tüləkəran (also, Yukhary Tyulekiran and Yukhary Tyulyakeran) is a village and municipality in the Quba Rayon of Azerbaijan. It has a population of 421.
