= Aşağı Tüləkəran =

- Municipality
- Location within Azerbaijan
- Coordinates: 41°16′40″N 48°26′36″E
- Country: Azerbaijan
- Rayon: Quba
- Elevation: 847 m (2,779 ft)

Population (2009)
  - Total: 558
- Time zone: UTC+4 (AZT)
  - Summer (DST): UTC+5 (AZT)

Aşağı Tüləkəran (also, Aşağı Tüləkaran, Ashagy Tyulekiran, Ashagy-Tyulyakeran, and Tyuler) is a village and municipality in the Quba Rayon of Azerbaijan.
