= Tülər =

- Municipality
- Location within Azerbaijan
- Coordinates: 41°16′16″N 48°27′11″E
- Country: Azerbaijan
- Rayon: Quba

Population
  - Total: 1,001
- Time zone: UTC+4 (AZT)
  - Summer (DST): UTC+5 (AZT)

Tülər (also, Tullyar, Tyuler, and Tyulyar) is a village and municipality in the Quba Rayon of Azerbaijan. It has a population of 1,001.
