= Lal-lo =

Municipality in Cagayan, Philippines

- Municipality
- Municipality of Lal-Lo
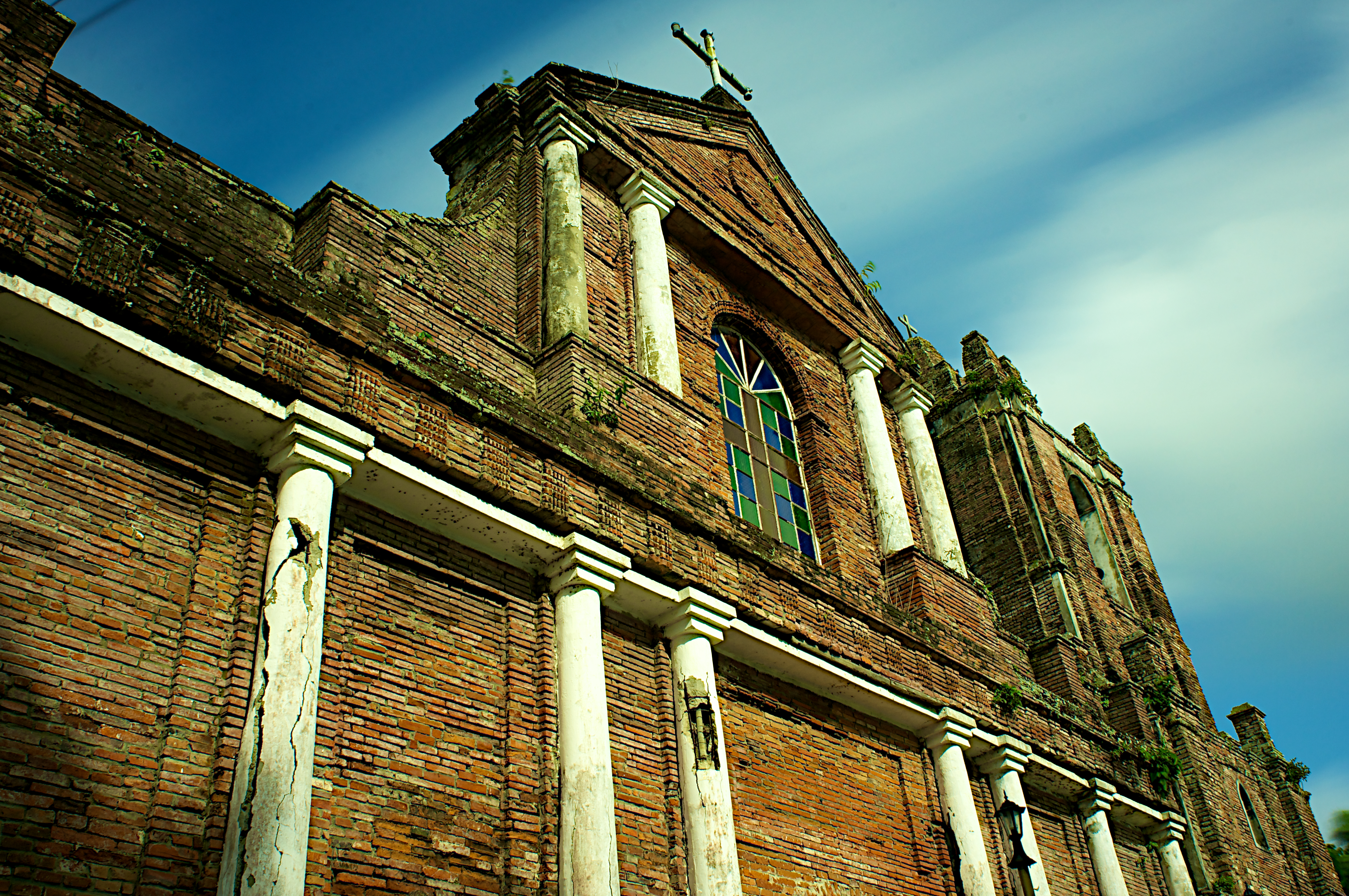
- Nueva Segovia Church

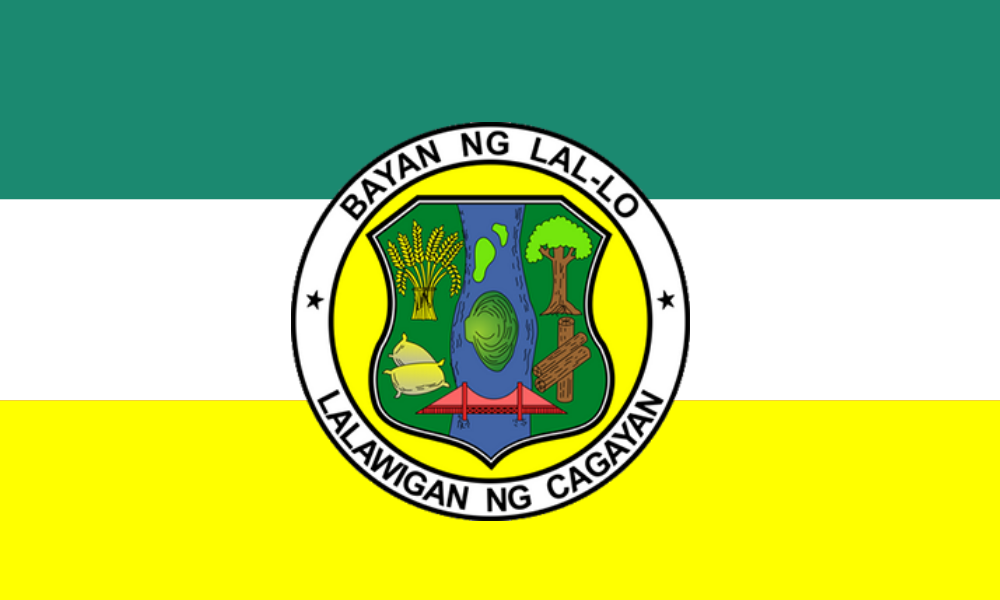
- Flag Seal

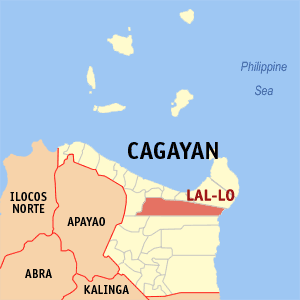
- Map of Cagayan with Lal-lo highlighted
- Interactive map of Lal-lo
- Location within the Philippines
- Coordinates: 18°12′00″N 121°39′44″E
- Country: Philippines
- Region: Cagayan Valley
- Province: Cagayan
- District: 1st district
- Barangays: 35 (see Barangays)

Government
  - Type: Sangguniang Bayan
  - Mayor: Florence Oliver B. Pascual
  - Vice Mayor: Maria Olivia B. Pascual
  - Representative: Ramon C. Nolasco Jr.
  - Electorate: 29,103 voters (2025)

Area
  - Total: 702.80 km^{2} (271.35 sq mi)
- Elevation: 9.7 m (32 ft)
- Highest elevation: 130 m (430 ft)
- Lowest elevation: 0 m (0 ft)

Population (2024 census)
  - Total: 48,404
  - Density: 68.873/km^{2} (178.38/sq mi)
  - Households: 11,612

Economy
  - Income class: 1st municipal income class
  - Poverty incidence: 9.64% (2023)
  - Revenue: ₱ 480.3 million (2024)
  - Assets: ₱ 1,384 million (2024)
  - Expenditure: ₱ 479.1 million (2024)
  - Liabilities: ₱ 560 million (2024)

Service provider
  - Electricity: Cagayan 2 Electric Cooperative (CAGELCO 2)
- Time zone: UTC+8 (PST)
- ZIP code: 3509
- PSGC: 0201516000
- IDD : area code: +63 (0)78
- Native languages: Ilocano; Ibanag; Cagayan Agta; Tagalog

Lal-lo, officially the Municipality of Lal-Lo (Ibanag: Ili nat Lal-lo; Ilocano: Ili ti Lal-lo; Tagalog: Bayan ng Lal-lo), is a municipality in the province of Cagayan, Philippines. According to the 2024 census, it has a population of 48,404 people.

The municipality was formerly known as Nueva Segovia ("New Segovia") and was the seat of the Diocese of Nueva Segovia before it was moved to Vigan, Ilocos Sur, during the Spanish colonial period. Despite its former name, the municipality has been part of the Archdiocese of Tuguegarao since 1910.

== Etymology ==
Lal-lo means "twisting two strands to make a rope", or may also refer to the strong river current as it is located along Cagayan River, the longest and largest river in the Philippines.

In Fr. Jose Bugarin's Ibanag dictionary "Lallo-c, a town in this province which existed as the ancient capital until 1839 [also] Lallo-c, to twist two strands, making a string or rope."

== History ==
=== Pre-Hispanic History ===
In the classical era, Lal-lo was the home of hunter-gatherers who were specialized in hunting mollusks. These hunter-gatherers stockpiled their leftover mollusk shells in numerous sites in Lal-lo and neighboring Gattaran. Eventually, the shells formed the largest stock of shell-midden sites in the entire Philippines.

=== Spanish Colonial Era ===
The first European to set foot on what is now the town of Lal-lo was Juan de Salcedo, a Spanish conquistador and grandson of Miguel Lopez de Legazpi, in 1572. Don Juan Pablo Carrión established it as a pueblo (municipality) in 1581 and named it Nueva Segovia. The reason is currently unknown, as the hometown of Carrión was Carrión de los Condes (Palencia, Spain), as suggested by his last name. This is mentioned by Juan Miguel Aguilera and Ángel Miranda in their book Espadas del Fin del Mundo (2016). A founding population of 200 Spanish citizens from Europe accompanied by 100 Spanish soldiers set up settlements across Cagayan Valley, headed by the city of Nueva Segovia (Old Lal-lo). These people were in turn supplemented by 155 Latin American soldiers recruited from Mexico.

==== Diocese of Nueva Segovia ====
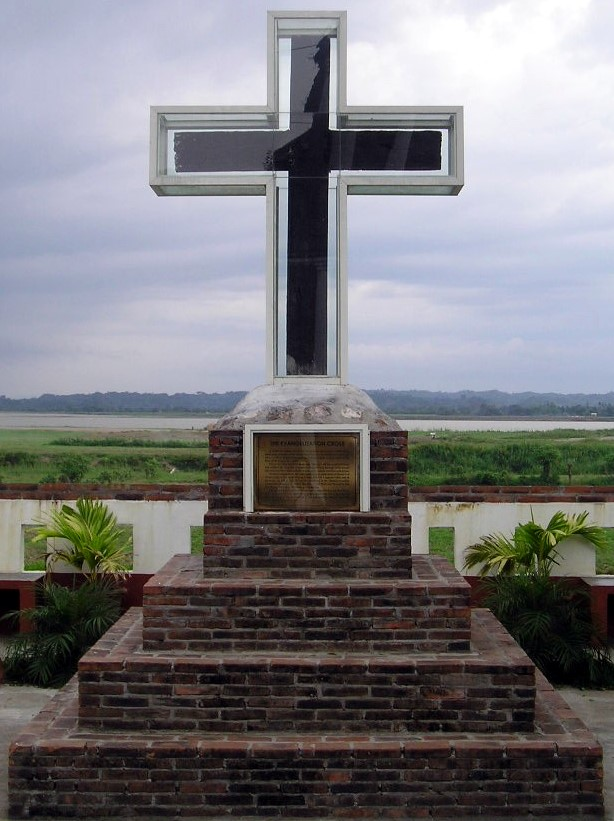
The evangelization cross of Lal-lo from Spanish colonial period, in front of the Nueva Segovia Church. The Cagayan River can be seen in the background.

In 1595, Pope Clement VIII created the Diocese of Nueva Segovia. In 1596, the Dominicans accepted it as an ecclesiastical mission. Nueva Segovia had three churches: the cathedral that was under the secular clergy, and the parishes of Centro and Tocolona under the supervision of the Dominicans. Because of its distance from Manila and the constant threat of the Cagayan River's rampaging waters, however, the Diocese of Nueva Segovia was transferred to Vigan in Ilocos Sur province in 1758. The diocese's name went along with the transfer to Vigan and to avoid confusion, Bishop Miguel Garcia requested that Nueva Segovia and its suburbs renamed back to Lal-lo. The seat of the Diocese of Nueva Segovia remains in Vigan, where it was elevated to being an archdiocese.

The transfer affected the closure of the cathedral and the merging of the three churches into the single parish of Centro. The two other churches were abandoned and eventually destroyed because of neglect while the church of Centro, dedicated to Santo Domingo de Guzman (Saint Dominic), became what is now Lal-lo Church. The remains of three bishops are interred in the church: Bishop Miguel de Benavides who was Nueva Segovia's first bishop and later of Manila where he founded the University of Santo Tomas, Bishop Diego de Soria who was the second bishop of the diocese, and Bishop Diego Aduarte who was the sixth.

==== Provincial capital ====
Lal-lo remained the capital of Cagayan province until 1839 when the provincial seat of power was relocated to Tuguegarao; its transformation into the most important town in Cagayan led to the decline of Lal-lo. It was accepted as an ecclesiastical mission by the Dominicans in 1604, 23 years after the foundation of Lal-lo. In the 1818 Spanish census, Lal-lo had a large Spanish to native ratio with native families amounting to only 975 whereas Spanish-Filipino families tallied to 513 in number.

==== Restoration of cityhood ====
The first attempt of the restoration of Lal-lo's city status was made during the first term of Mayor Florante Pascual. The historical document originally signed by King Philip was not found, even after sending a research delegation to Madrid. Pascual determined that the restoration of Lal-lo's cityhood be made through an earlier bill.

There was a move in the Philippine Congress to regain its cityhood as a component city, and also rename the municipality back to its original name, Nueva Segovia.

Renewed attempt of city status restoration was carried out in January 2012. Board member Maria Olivia Pascual said that researchers had found a Spanish document that declared the municipality as a city. According to Pascual, a bill seeking the restoration of the city status of Lal-lo (the former Ciudad Nueva Segovia) could be filed again through the efforts of First District Representative Juan Ponce Enrile, Jr.

As recently as 2018, vice mayor Oliver Pascual has said that the establishment of Northern Cagayan International Airport in the municipality would be "a great boost" in its bid for the restoration of its city status.

=== Contemporary ===
In 2006, the shell-midden sites of Lal-lo and Gattaran were included in the UNESCO Tentative List for World Heritage Site inclusion, a step closer to becoming a world heritage site. The shell-midden sites are currently being conserved by the local government from looting to preserve its outstanding universal value. In 2023, the government identified Lal-lo airport as a venue for American military forces as part of the Enhanced Defense Cooperation Agreement (EDCA).

In 2018, the provincial government of Cagayan through the leadership of Governor Manuel Mamba planned to make Lal-lo the provincial capital of Cagayan again.

== Geography ==
Lal-lo is situated 84.56 kilometres (52.54 mi) from the provincial capital Tuguegarao, and 569.71 kilometres (354.00 mi) from the country's capital city of Manila.

=== Barangays ===
Lal-lo is politically subdivided into 35 barangays. Each barangay consists of puroks while some have sitios.

- Abagao
- Alaguia
- Bagumbayan
- Bangag
- Bical
- Bicud
- Binag
- Cabayabasan (Capacuan)
- Cagoran
- Cambong
- Catayauan
- Catugan
- Centro (Poblacion)
- Cullit
- Dagupan
- Dalaya
- Fabrica
- Fusina
- Jurisdiction
- Lalafugan
- Logac
- Magallungon (Santa Teresa)
- Magapit
- Malanao
- Maxingal
- Naguilian
- Paranum
- Rosario
- San Antonio (Lafu)
- San Jose
- San Juan
- San Lorenzo
- San Mariano
- Santa Maria
- Tucalana

=== Climate ===
Climate data for Lal-lo, Cagayan
Month	Jan	Feb	Mar	Apr	May	Jun	Jul	Aug	Sep	Oct	Nov	Dec	Year
Mean daily maximum °C (°F)	25 (77)	26 (79)	29 (84)	31 (88)	31 (88)	31 (88)	30 (86)	30 (86)	30 (86)	28 (82)	27 (81)	25 (77)	29 (84)
Mean daily minimum °C (°F)	20 (68)	20 (68)	21 (70)	23 (73)	24 (75)	25 (77)	25 (77)	25 (77)	24 (75)	23 (73)	23 (73)	21 (70)	23 (73)
Average precipitation mm (inches)	120 (4.7)	77 (3.0)	62 (2.4)	40 (1.6)	118 (4.6)	138 (5.4)	162 (6.4)	173 (6.8)	143 (5.6)	198 (7.8)	185 (7.3)	248 (9.8)	1,664 (65.4)
Average rainy days	16.9	12.2	11.5	10.6	18.7	20.1	21.2	23.3	20.8	16.9	16.5	20.0	208.7
Source: Meteoblue

== Demographics ==
Population census of Lal-lo

Year	Pop.	±% p.a.
1903	7,309	—
1918	9,385	+1.68%
1939	12,921	+1.53%
1948	10,730	−2.04%
1960	16,834	+3.82%
1970	21,400	+2.43%
1975	24,866	+3.06%
1980	26,947	+1.62%

Year	Pop.	±% p.a.
1990	31,373	+1.53%
1995	32,156	+0.46%
2000	36,529	+2.77%
2007	39,607	+1.12%
2010	41,388	+1.61%
2015	44,506	+1.39%
2020	48,733	+1.93%
2024	48,404	−0.16%

Source: Philippine Statistics Authority

In the 2024 census, the population of Lal-lo was 48,404 people, with a density of 69 inhabitants per square kilometre or 180 inhabitants per square mile.

== Economy ==
Poverty incidence of Lal-lo (%)

Source: Philippine Statistics Authority

== Government ==
=== Local government ===
Lal-lo is part of the first legislative district of the province of Cagayan. It is governed by a mayor, designated as its local chief executive, and by a municipal council as its legislative body in accordance with the Local Government Code. The mayor, vice mayor, and the municipal councilors are elected directly by the people through an election held every three years.

=== Elected officials ===
Members of the Municipal Council (2022–2025)
Position	Name
Congressman	Ramon C. Nolasco Jr.
Mayor	Oliver Pascual
Vice-Mayor	Maria Olivia B. Pascual
Councilors	Crystalyn Mae D. Invierno
Councilors	Simeon O. Israel Jr.
Councilors	Rowyn Rowel M. Samonte
Councilors	Monette V. Caliva
Councilors	Gayleen S. Durupa
Councilors	Jimmy P. Balatico
Councilors	Jimmy C. Bacuyag
Councilors	Winston L. Rosales

== Infrastructure ==
The Northern Cagayan International Airport in southern Lal-lo was constructed to support both the Cagayan Special Economic Zone in northern Cagayan and to serve seaborne traffic through Port Irene. The airport project involved the construction of a 2,200 metres (7,200 ft) runway with a width of 45 miles (72 km), following the standards of the International Civil Aviation Organization. The international airport accommodates large aircraft such as the Airbus A319-100 and Boeing regional jets of comparable size. Royal Air Philippines offers service twice weekly using BAe146 aircraft.

== Education ==
The Schools Division of Cagayan governs the town's public education system. The division office is a field office of the DepEd in Cagayan Valley region. There are three schools district offices that govern all the public and private elementary and high schools throughout the municipality. These are Lal-lo North District, Lal-lo Central District and Lal-lo South District.

=== Primary and elementary schools ===
- Alaguia Elementary School
- Bangag Elementary School
- Bical Elementary School
- Bicud Elementary School
- Cabayabasan Adventist Multigrade School
- Cabayabasan Elementary School
- Catugan Elementary School
- Cullit Elementary School
- Eduardo B. Batalla Elementary School
- Fusina Elementary School
- Jurisdiccion Christian Learning Center
- Lalafugan Elementary School
- Lal-lo North Central School
- Logac Elementary School
- Logac Adventist Multigrade Schoo
- Magapit Elementary School
- Malanao Elementary School
- Maxingal Elementary School
- Naguilian Elementary School
- San Antonio Elementary School
- San Juan Elementary School
- San Lorenzo Elementary School
- Sta. Maria Central School
- Tolentino Academy of Lal-lo

=== Secondary schools ===
- Bical National High School
- Cabayabasan National High School
- Magapit National High School
- Lal-lo National High School
- Logac National High School
- Lyceum of Lal-lo

=== Higher educational institution ===
- Cagayan State University - Lal-lo

== Media ==
=== Radio ===
- DWRL 95.1 - Community radio
- CPIO Teleradyo 100.9 - Provincial Government of Cagayan

=== Cable TV providers ===
- RBS Powerlink Cable TV
- Reliant Cable Network Services
