= Cagayan =

- Province
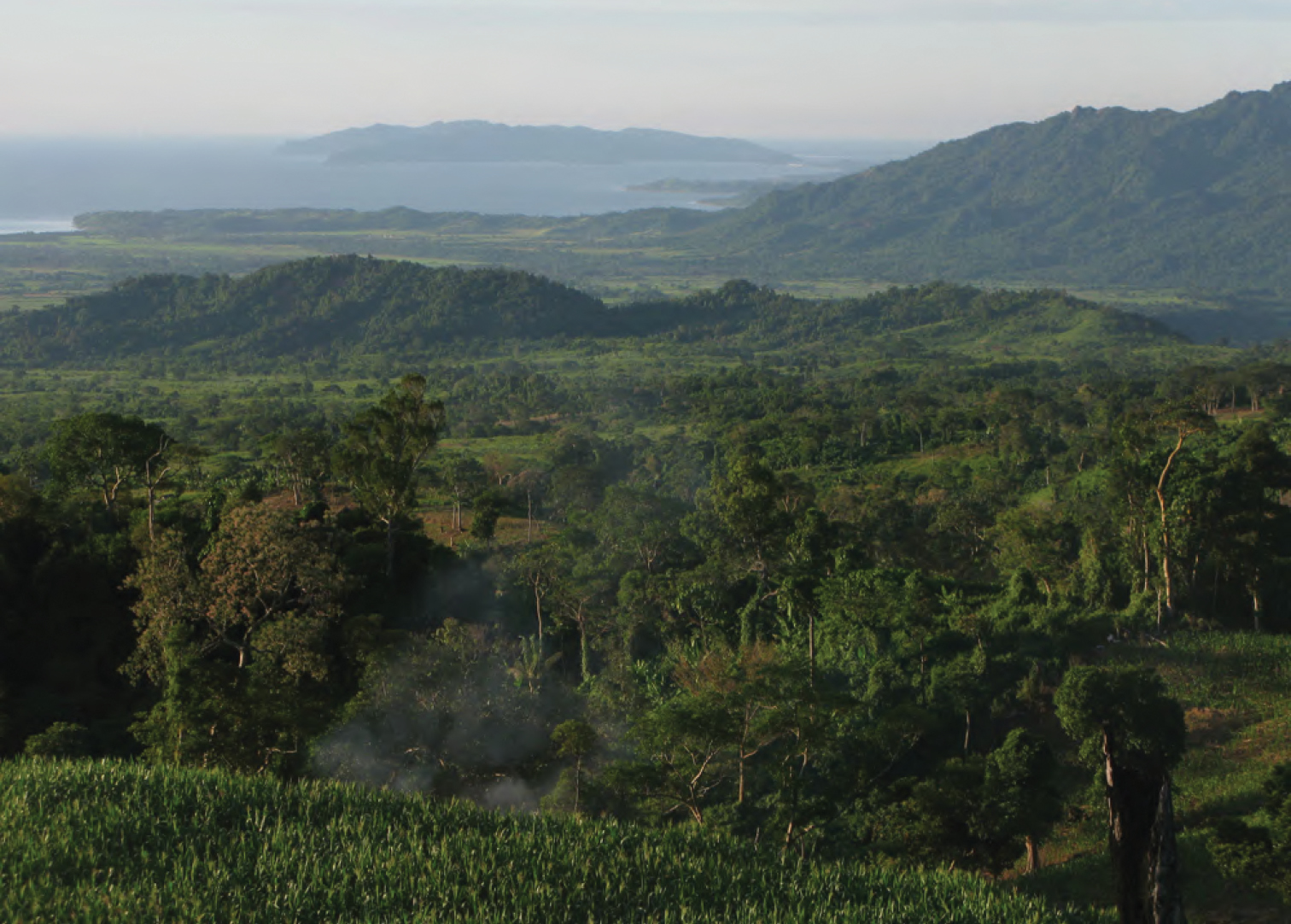
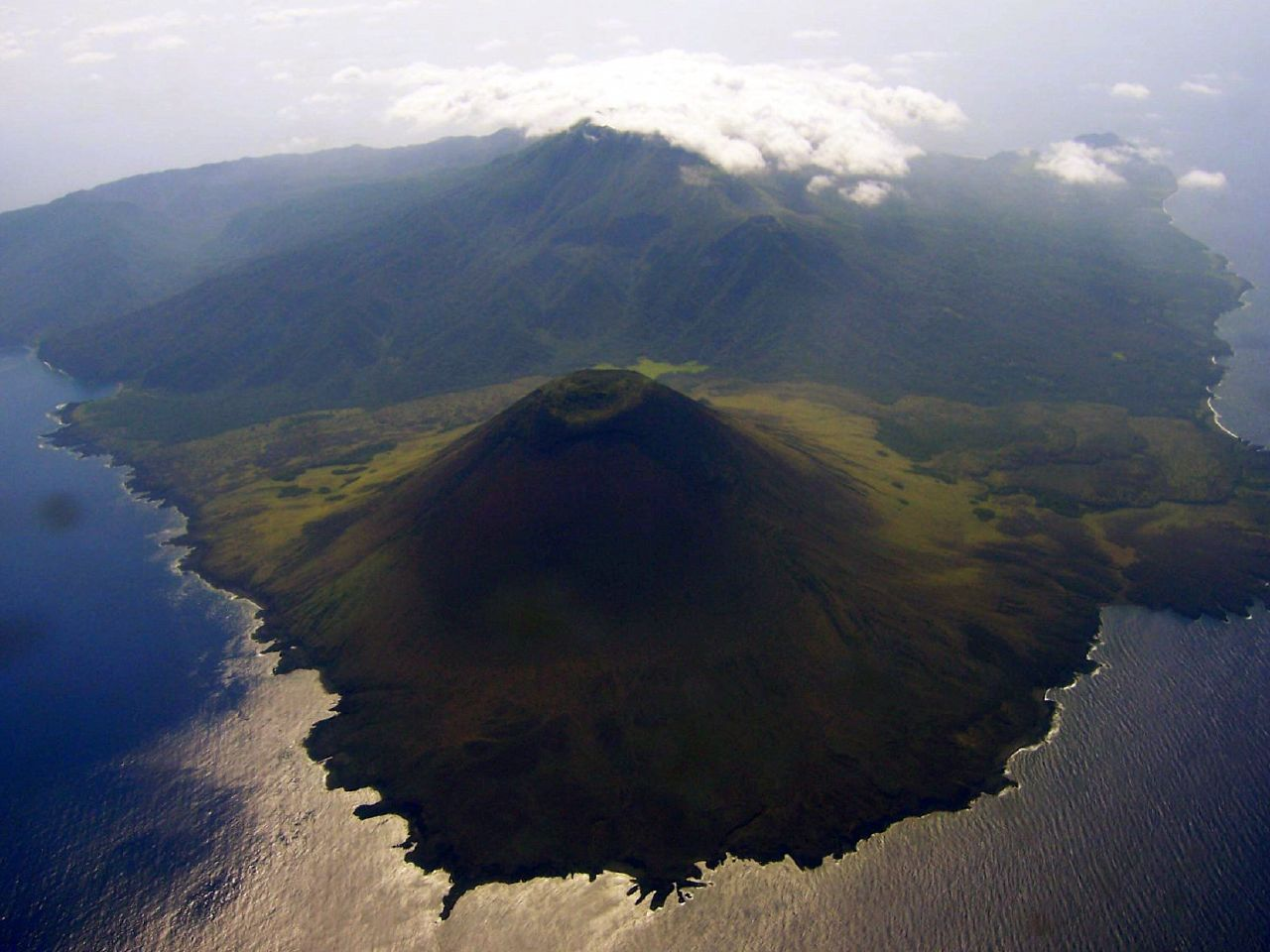
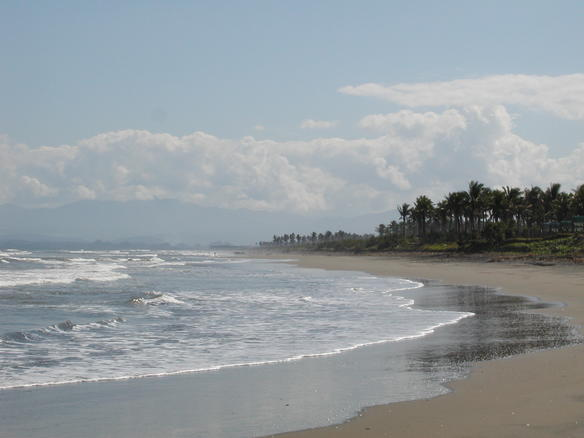
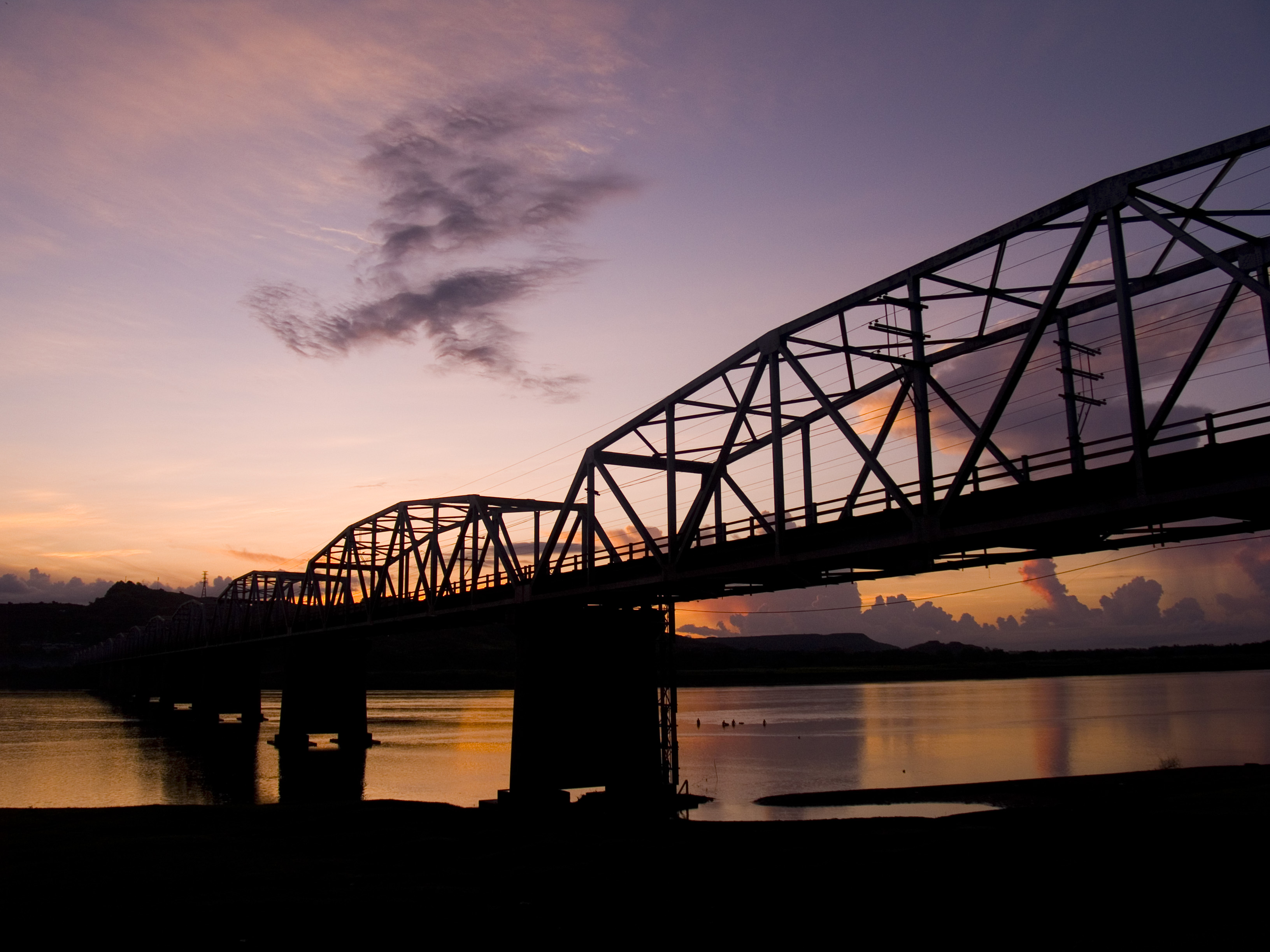
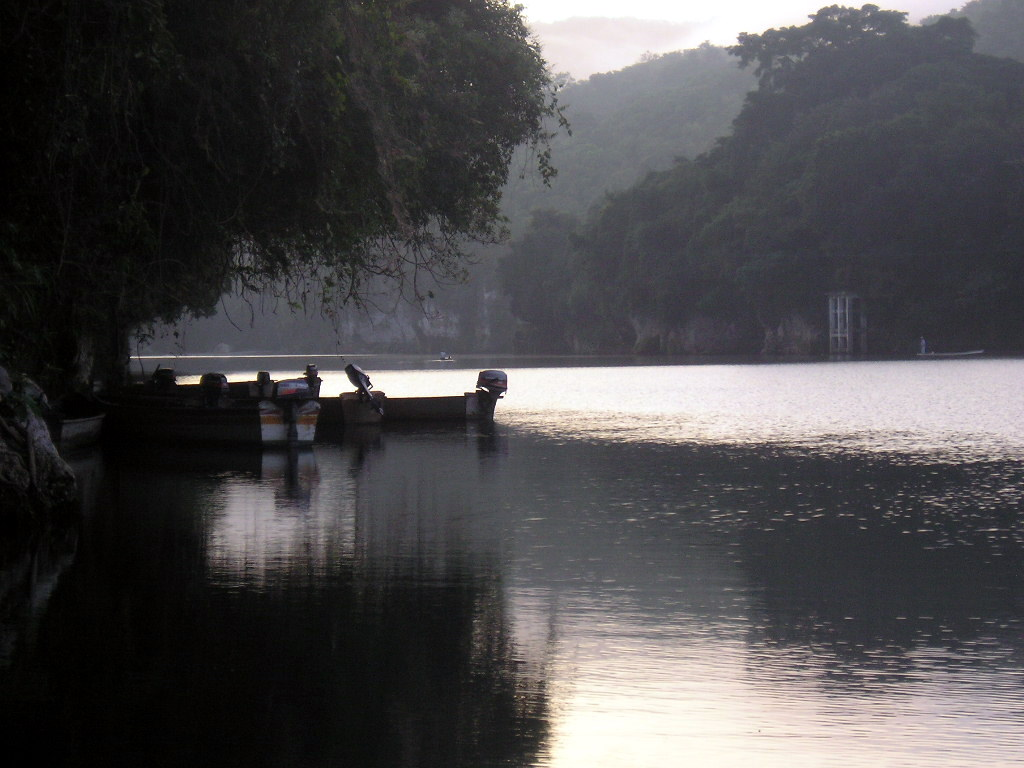
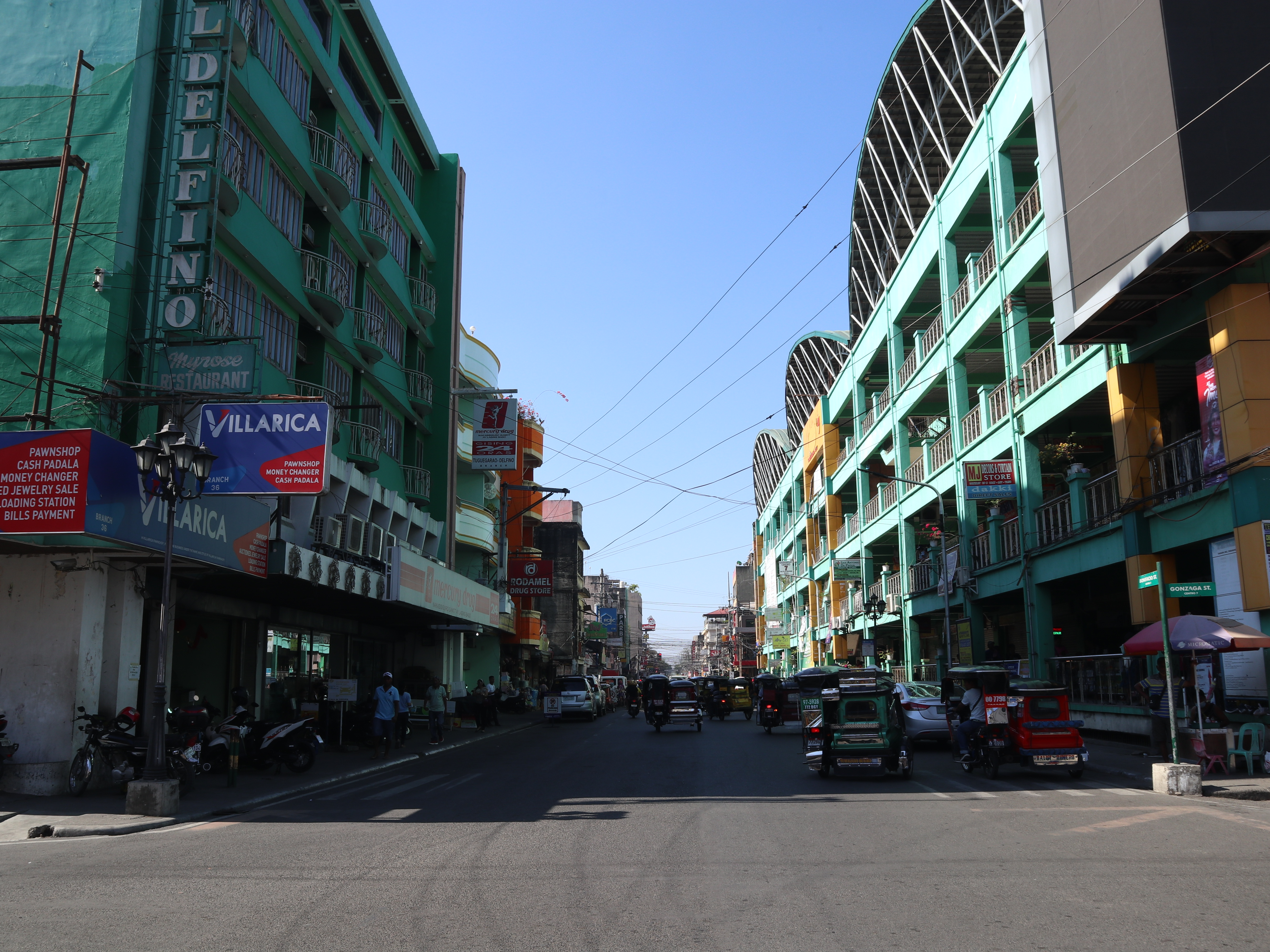
- (from top: left to right) Sierra Madre Mountains in Santa Ana, Smith and Babuyan Claro Volcano, Beach in Buguey, Buntun Bridge in Tuguegarao, Pinacanauan River and Downtown Tuguegarao.

- Flag Seal
- Nickname: Land of Smile and Beauty
- Motto: Pabaruen ti Cagayan
- Location in the Philippines
- Interactive map of Cagayan
- Coordinates: 18°00′N 121°48′E
- Country: Philippines
- Region: Cagayan Valley
- Founded: June 29, 1583
- Capital and largest city: Tuguegarao

Government
  - Governor: Edgar B. Aglipay (Nacionalista)
  - Vice Governor: Manuel N. Mamba (Nacionalista)
  - Legislature: Cagayan Provincial Board
  - Electorate: 785,994 voters (2025)

Area
  - Total: 9,398.07 km^{2} (3,628.62 sq mi)
  - Rank: 5th out of 82
- Highest elevation (Mount Cetaceo): 1,823 m (5,981 ft)

Population (2024 census)
  - Total: 1,284,676
  - Rank: 23rd out of 82
  - Density: 136.696/km^{2} (354.040/sq mi)
  - Rank: 63rd out of 82
  - Households: 301,528
- Demonyms: Cagayanon; Cagayano

Divisions
  - Independent cities: 0
  - Component cities: 1: Tuguegarao
  - Municipalities: 28: Abulug; Alcala; Allacapan; Amulung; Aparri; Baggao; Ballesteros; Buguey; Calayan; Camalaniugan; Claveria; Enrile; Gattaran; Gonzaga; Iguig; Lal-lo; Lasam; Pamplona; Peñablanca; Piat; Rizal; Sanchez-Mira; Santa Ana; Santa Praxedes; Santa Teresita; Santo Niño (Faire); Solana; Tuao
  - Barangays: 820
  - Districts: Legislative districts of Cagayan

Economy
  - Income class: 1st provincial income class
  - Poverty incidence: 5.7% (2023)
  - Revenue: ₱ 3,937 million (2024)
  - Assets: ₱ 14,234 million (2024)
  - Expenditure: ₱ 2,716 million (2024)
  - Liabilities: ₱ 1,539 million (2024)
- Time zone: UTC+8 (PHT)
- PSGC: 021500000
- IDD : area code: +63 (0)78
- ISO 3166 code: PH-CAG
- Spoken languages: Ilocano; Ibanag; Isnag; Itawis; Ivatan; Tagalog; English
- Catholic Diocese: Roman Catholic Archdiocese of Tuguegarao
- Patron Saint: Our Lady of Piat
- Website: www.cagayan.gov.ph

Cagayan (/kɑːɡəˈjɑːn/ kah-gə-YAHN, [kagɐˈjan]), officially the Province of Cagayan (Ilocano: Probinsia ti Cagayan; Ibanag: Provinsiya na Cagayan; Itawit: Provinsiya ya Cagayan; Isnag: Provinsia nga Cagayan; Ivatan: Provinsiya nu Cagayan; Gaddang: Provinsia na Cagayan; Filipino: Lalawigan ng Cagayan), is a province in the Philippines located in the Cagayan Valley region, covering the northeastern tip of Luzon. Its capital is Tuguegarao, the largest city of that province as well as the regional center of Region 2 (Cagayan Valley). It is about 431 kilometres (268 mi) northwest of Manila, and includes the Babuyan Islands to the north. The province borders Ilocos Norte and Apayao to the west, and Kalinga and Isabela to the south.

Cagayan was one of the early provinces that existed during the Spanish colonial period. Called La Provincia de Cagayan, its borders essentially covered the entire Cagayan Valley, which included the present provinces of Isabela, Quirino, Nueva Vizcaya, Batanes and portions of Kalinga, Apayao, and Aurora. The former capital was Nueva Segovia, which also served as the seat of the Diocese of Nueva Segovia. Today, only 9,295.75 square kilometres (3,589.11 sq mi) remain of the former vastness of the province. The entire region, however, is still referred to as Cagayan Valley.

== Etymology ==
A folk legend holds that the name was originally derived from the tagay, a plant that grows abundantly in the northern part of the province. The term Catagayan, "the place where the tagay grows" was shortened to Cagayan. Linguists, however, hold that cagayan comes from an ancient, lost word that means "river". Variations of this word—karayan, kayan, kahayan, kayayan, kagayan and kalayan—all mean river, referring to Cagayan River. It is said to have also shared etymology with Cagayan de Oro in Mindanao with the similar reference, also called Cagayan River.

== History ==
=== Early history ===
Cagayan has a prehistoric civilization with a rich and diverse culture. According to archaeologists, the earliest man in the Philippines probably lived in Cagayan thousands of years ago.

In the classical era, Gattaran and Lal-lo was the home of hunter-gatherers who specialized in hunting mollusks. These hunter-gatherers have stockpiled their leftover mollusk shells in numerous sites in Gattaran and Lal-lo, until eventually, the shells formed into the largest stock of shell-midden sites in the entire Philippines.

The Atta or Negritos were the first people in valley. They were later moved to the uplands or variably assimilated by the Austronesians, from whom the Ibanags, Itawes, Yogads, Gaddangs, Irayas and Malawegs descended - who actually came from one ethnicity. These are the people found by the Spaniards in the different villages along the rivers all over Cagayan. The Spaniards rightly judged that these various villagers came from a single racial stock and decided to make the Ibanag language the lingua franca, both civilly and ecclesiastically for the entire people of Cagayan which they called collectively as the Cagayanes which later was transliterated to become Cagayanos.

Cagayan was a major site for the Maritime Jade Road, one of the most extensive sea-based trade networks of a single geological material in the prehistoric world, operating for 3,000 years from 2000 BCE to 1000 CE.

Even before the Spaniards came to Cagayan, the Cagayanos have already made contact with various civilizations like the Chinese, Japanese and even Indians, as evidenced by various artifacts and even the presence of minor to moderate foreign linguistic elements in the languages of the natives.

Various other peoples, mainly the Ilocanos, Pangasinenses, Kapampangans and Tagalogs, as well as Visayans, Moros, Ivatans, and even foreigners like the Chinese, Indians, Arabs, Spaniards and others were further infused to the native Cagayanes to become the modern Cagayano that we know today.

The north coast was also the site of a Wokou state when the Japanese pirate-lord Tay Fusa set up his stronghold there before its destruction during the 1582 Cagayan battles.

=== Spanish colonial era ===
In 1581, Captain Juan Pablo Carreon arrived in Cagayan with a hundred fully equipped soldiers and their families by order of Gonzalo Ronquillo de Peñaloza, the fourth Spanish Governor-General of the Philippines. The expeditionary force was sent to explore the Cagayan Valley, to convert the natives to Catholicism, and to establish ecclesiastical missions and towns throughout the valley.

On June 29, 1572, Spanish conquistador Juan de Salcedo traced the northern coastline of Luzon and set foot on the Massi (Pamplona), Tular, and Aparri areas.

==== La Provincia de Cagayan ====
In 1583, through a Spanish Royal Decree, the entire northeastern portion of Luzon (specifically, all territories east of the Cordillera mountains and those north of the Caraballo mountains) including the islands in the Balintang Channel were organized into one large political unit called the La Provincia de Cagayán. The provincia's territorial delineation encompassed the present provinces of Batanes, Isabela, Quirino, Nueva Vizcaya, including portions of Kalinga, Apayao, Mountain Province, Ifugao, and Aurora. Its capital was Nueva Segovia (the present municipality of Lal-lo). It was sometimes called Cagayán de Luzón to distinguish it from other places bearing the name Cagayan.

The Spanish friars soon established mission posts in Camalaniugan and Lal-lo (Nueva Segovia), which became the seat of the Diocese established by Pope Clement VIII on August 14, 1595.

A founding population of 200 Spanish citizens from Europe accompanied by 100 soldiers set up settlements across Cagayan Valley. These people were in turn supplemented by 155 Latin American soldiers recruited from Mexico By the end of the 1700s, Zambales had 9,888 native families. The see was moved in 1758 to Vigan because of its relative distance. The Spanish influence can still be seen in the massive churches and other buildings.

By year 1818, these founding Spaniards and Mexicans blossomed into a large population of 536 Spanish-Filipino families. Of which: 6 were in Dupax, 16 were in Gamu, 1 was in Abulug, and 513 were in Lal-lo. Bagabag when it was once part of Cagayan was also home to 10,808 native families and 25 Spanish-Filipino Mestizo families, before the province was transferred to the province of Nueva Vizcaya.

In 1839, Nueva Vizcaya was established as a politico-military province and was separated from Cagayan. Later, Isabela was founded as a separate province on May 1, 1856, its areas carved from the southern Cagayan and eastern Nueva Vizcaya territories.

During the late 18th century, the New Spain government encouraged the expansion of trade and the development of commodity crops. Among these was tobacco, and lands in Cagayan became the center of a vertically integrated monopoly: tobacco was grown there and shipped to Manila, where it was processed and made into cigarettes and cigars. The development of the related bureaucracy and accounting systems was done under the leadership of José de Gálvez, who as visitor-general to Mexico from 1765 to 1772 developed the monopoly there and increased revenues to the Crown. He worked in the Philippines as Minister of the Indies from 1776 to 1787, constructing a similar monopoly there under Governor-General Basco y Vargas (1778–1787). The Spanish development of this industry affected all their economic gains in the Philippines.

The establishment of the civil government of Cagayan through the 1583 Spanish Royal Decree is commemorated in the annual Aggao Nac Cagayan celebrations of the Provincial Government of Cagayan and its people.

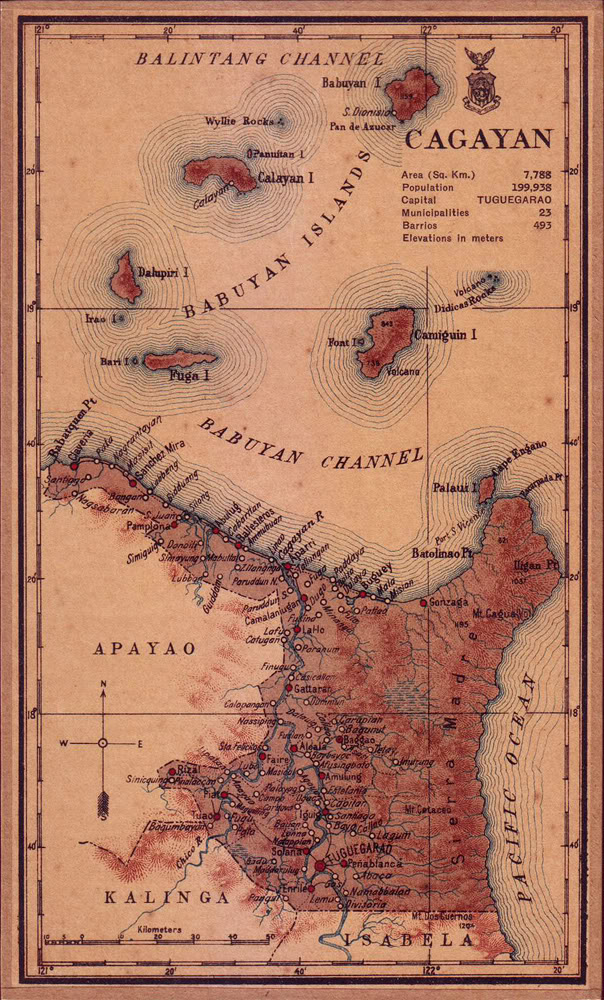
An old map of Cagayan during the 1918 Census

=== American era ===
When the Treaty of Paris was signed in 1898, ending the Spanish–American War, the United States took over the Philippines. It influenced the culture, most notably in agriculture and education, as well as in public works and communications. A naval base also increased interaction between local Filipinos and American sailors and administrators. At the close of the 18th century, there were 29 municipalities in the province of Cagayan. After the Philippines came under American sovereignty in 1902, more municipalities were founded. Since then, due to centralization and shifting of populations, the number of municipalities is back to 29. A new wave of immigration began in the late 19th and 20th centuries with the arrival of another group of the Ilocano settlers who came in large numbers. They now constitute the largest group in the province, and it was only in this large-scale Ilocano immigration & settlement that made Ilocano language replaced Ibanag as the lingua franca of the province.

=== Japanese occupation ===
During the Second World War, with air raids by Japanese fighters and bombers, the province of Cagayan suffered much destruction by bombing and later invasion. Japanese Imperial forces entered Cagayan in 1942. While under the Japanese Occupation, several pre-war infantry divisions and regular units of the Philippine Commonwealth Army were re-established during the period on January 3, 1942, to June 30, 1946. They established general headquarters, camps and garrisoned troops in the province of Cagayan, and began operations against the Japanese Occupation forces in the Cagayan Valley. This included sending troops to the provinces of Cagayan and Isabela, and helping the local soldiers of the 11th and 14th Infantry Regiment of the USAFIP-NL, the local guerrilla fighters and the U.S. liberation forces. They fought against the Japanese Imperial forces from 1942 to 1945.

The Battle off Cape Engaño on October 26, 1944, was held off Cape Engaño. At that time American carrier forces attacked the Japanese Northern Force. This became the concluding action of the Battle of Leyte Gulf. The Japanese lost 4 carriers, 3 light cruisers and 9 destroyers.

In 1945, the combined United States and Philippine troops, together with the recognized guerrillas, took Cagayan. Part of the action were the Filipino soldiers of the 11th and 14th Infantry Regiment, Philippine Commonwealth Army, USAFIP-NL liberated the province of Cagayan during the Second World War.

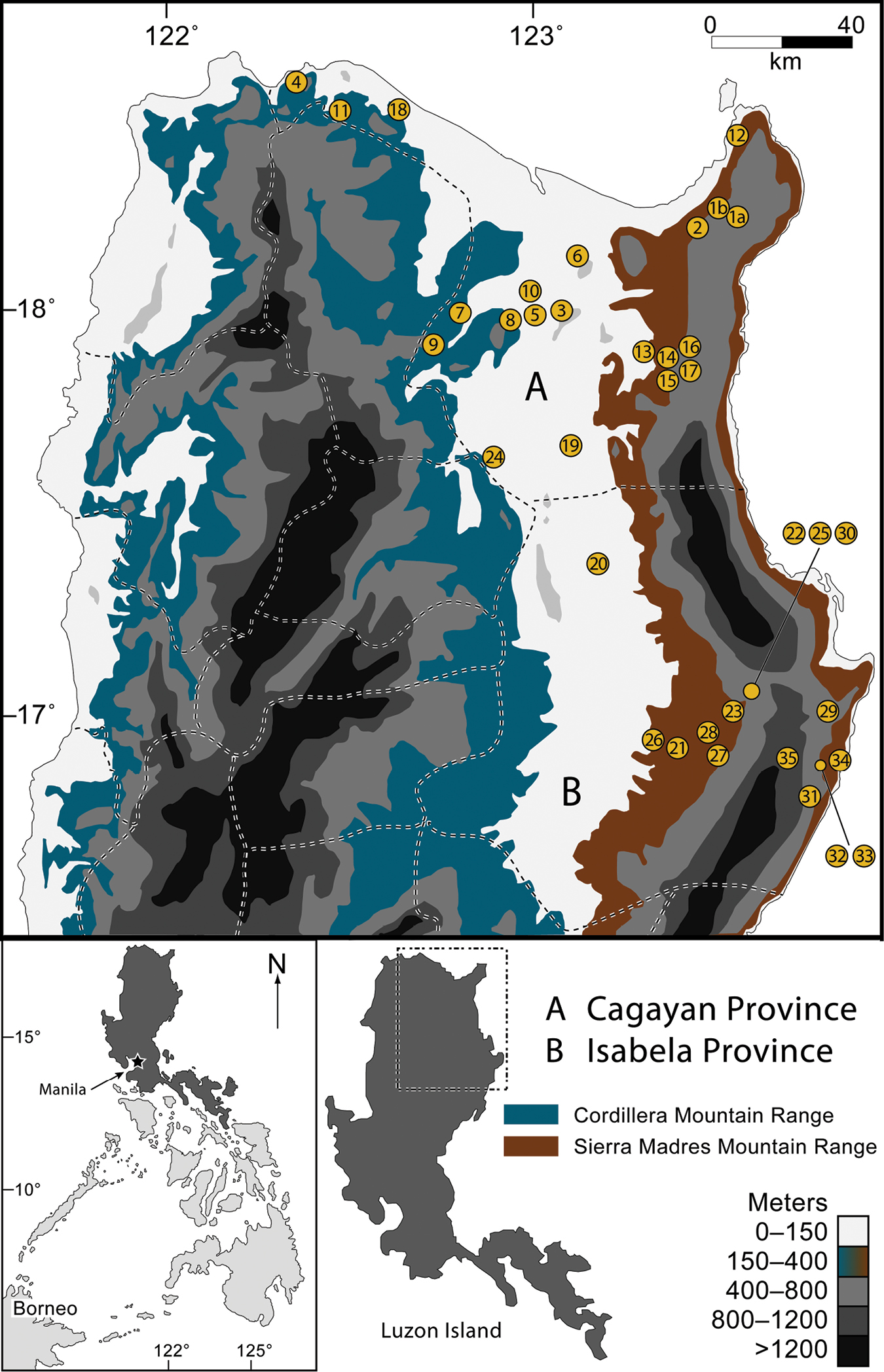
Northern Luzon topographical map showing Cagayan

=== Postwar Era ===
After World War II Baldomero Perez of Tuguegarao was temporarily appointed as Governor of Cagayan by the Philippine Civil Affairs Unit, serving until he was replaced by Peregrino R. Quinto in 1946.

=== Martial law era ===
Beginning in the 1970s, Cagayan became known as a bailiwick of Juan Ponce Enrile of Gonzaga, who as Secretary and later Minister of National Defense became one of the most powerful figures during the Martial Law period under President Ferdinand Marcos. His influence enabled the construction of Port Irene, a modernized international harbor facility in Santa Ana that was named after Marcos' daughter Irene, which later formed the basis for the creation of the Cagayan Special Economic Zone and Freeport, whose enabling law was authored by Enrile as a Senator in 1995 and now includes Santa Ana and parts of Aparri.

Loan-funded government spending to promote Ferdinand Marcos’ 1969 reelection campaign caused the Philippine economy to take a sudden downwards turn in the last months of the 1960s. Known as the 1969 Philippine balance of payments crisis, this led to social unrest throughout the country beginning with the First Quarter Storm protests of 1970, and incidents of violence like the Plaza Miranda bombing. Marcos responded by vilifying his critics as "communists" and suspending the privilege of the writ of habeas corpus through Proclamation No. 889 in August 1971, but this pushed moderate student protesters towards the radical left, and causing many of them to go home to their home provinces like Cagayan. Marcos' actions thus lead the Marxist–Leninist–Maoist Communist Party of the Philippines to gain a significant presence in many Cagayan municipalities, although not as much in Tuguegarao itself.

With only a year left in his last constitutionally allowed term as president Ferdinand Marcos placed the Philippines under Martial Law in September 1972 and thus retained the position for fourteen more years. This period in Philippine history is remembered for the Marcos administration's record of human rights abuses, particularly targeting political opponents, student activists, journalists, religious workers, farmers, and others who fought against the Marcos dictatorship. In Tuguegarao, Camp Marcelo Adduru became the province's main detention center for "political detainees", who were often never formally charged with a crime, and thus technically not counted by Marcos as "prisoners." Others disappeared without the trace for daring to speak against Marcos, such as Romeo Crismo, a teacher at Cagayan Teacher's College and St. Louis College in Tuguegarao, who criticized the 1973 Philippine constitutional plebiscite as a sham election. He disappeared without a trace in August 1980 after unknown men tried to capture him in front of his students the day before. He was later honored by having his name inscribed on the wall of remembrance of the Philippines' Bantayog ng mga Bayani, in recognition of his martyrdom while resisting authoritarianism.

During that time, logging concessions were awarded in the province by the Marcoses to Enrile and other cronies, leading to the severe degradation of forest cover in the province that contributed to widespread flooding and other environmental issues that persist today.

=== During the People Power revolution ===
Cagayan saw incidents of political violence during the 1986 Philippine presidential election, including the fatal shooting by militiamen of opposition leader Euginio Coloma in the municipality of Buguey.

A number of Cagayanon politicians played parts in the People Power Revolution two weeks after the election, and in the following one year in which the Philippines was under an interim provisional revolutionary government between 1986 and 1987. This included Enrile, whose failed attempt to lead a coup against Marcos was one of the precipitating events behind the revolution, and former Cagayan Governor Teresa J. Dupaya, who supported the opposition during the election and was re-appointed to her old post as Governor when the provisional government was established.

=== Contemporary ===
==== Hotel Delfino siege ====
Cagayan was also the site of the Hotel Delfino Siege in Tuguegarao, which took place on March 4, 1990, when efforts to arrest suspended governor Rodolfo Aguinaldo for supporting rebellions against the government of President Corazon Aquino led to him storming the provincial capitol and taking hostages including his would-be arresting officer, Brigadier General Oscar Florendo of the Armed Forces of the Philippines Civil Relations Service. The stand-off deteriorated into a series of gun-battles throughout the town, with Florendo being killed presumably in a crossfire inside the hotel and Aguinaldo managing to escape and go into hiding before later surrendering and being cleared of legal charges by winning reelection in 1992. He was later elected congressman in 1998 but was assassinated by the New People's Army in 2001.

==== 2020 Ulysses Flood ====
Cagayan has been heavily impacted by changing weather patterns resulting from climate change, with the 2020 Ulysses flood being noted as one of the most severe examples.

In November 2020, Typhoon Vamco (locally known in the Philippines as Typhoon Ulysses) crossed the country, dams from all around Luzon neared their spilling points, forcing them to release large amounts of water into impounds, including Magat Dam. The dam opened all of its 7 gates at 24 metres (79 ft), releasing over 5,037 cubic metres (1,331,000 US gal) of water into the Cagayan River flooding numerous riverside towns. Waters under the Buntun Bridge went up as high as 13 metres (43 ft), flooding the nearby barangays up to the roofs of houses.

Because there was very little media coverage of the flooding in the area in the wake of the COVID-19 lockdown in Luzon and the Shutdown of ABS-CBN broadcasting earlier that year, residents resorted to social media to request the national government for rescue. As a result of the catastrophe, the National Irrigation Administration (NIA) indicated that it would review its protocols regarding the release of water in Magat Dam and improve its watershed.

== Geography ==
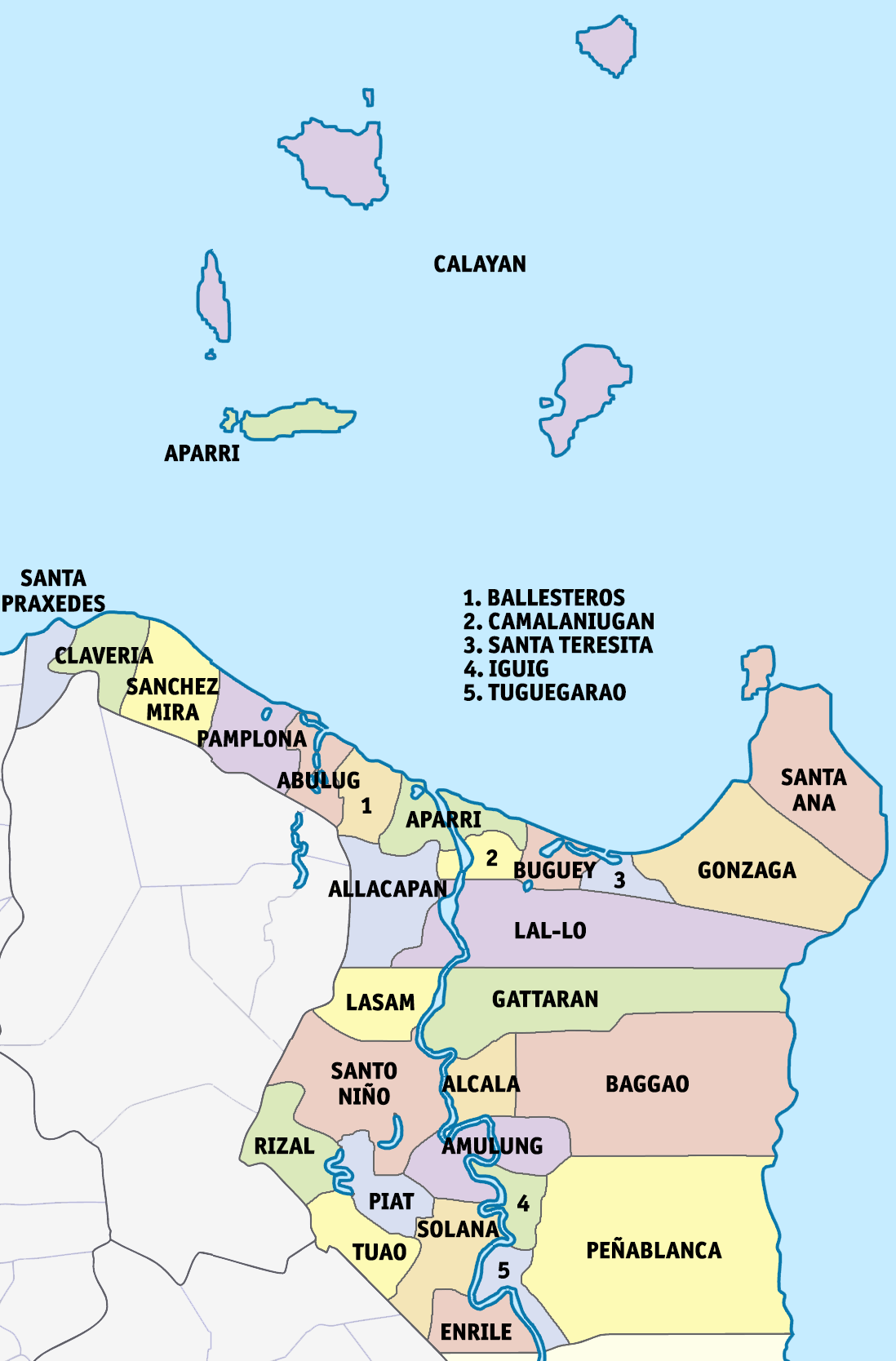
Political map of Cagayan

Situated within the Cagayan Valley region, the province is bounded by the Philippine Sea on the east; on the south by Isabela province; on the west by the Cordillera Mountains; and on the north by the Balintang Channel and the Babuyan Group of Islands. About 2 kilometres (1.2 mi) from the northeastern tip of the province is the island of Palaui; a few kilometers to the west is Fuga Island. The Babuyan Group of Islands, which includes Calayan, Dalupiri, Camiguin, and Babuyan Claro, is about 60 nautical miles (110 km) north of Luzon mainland.

The eastern coast forms the northern portion of the Sierra Madre mountain range, while the western limits are generally hilly to low in elevation. The central area, dominated by a large valley, forms the lower basin of the country's longest river, the Cagayan. The mouth is located at the northern town of Aparri.

The province of Cagayan comprises an aggregate land area of 9,295.75 square kilometres (3,589.11 sq mi) which constitutes approximately three percent of the total land area of the country, making it the second largest province in the region.

The province is also home to the Peñablanca Protected Landscape and Seascape, a 118,781 ha (293,510 acres) protected area in the municipality of Peñablanca that contains Callao Cave. In February 2020, the National Museum of the Philippines officially declared Callao Cave an Important Cultural Property.

=== Administrative divisions ===
Cagayan comprises 28 municipalities and one city divided into three congressional districts. It has 820 barangays. Tuguegarao is the provincial capital, regional seat, and center of business, trade, and education and the only city in the province.

- † Provincial capital and component city
- Municipality

City or municipality^{[A]}		District	Population			±% p.a.	Area		Density		Barangay	Coordinates^{[B]}
			(2020)		(2015)		km^{2}	sq mi	/km^{2}	/sq mi		
Abulug		2nd	2.7%	34,579	32,497	1.19%	162.60	62.78	210	540	20	18°26′37″N 121°27′26″E
Alcala		4th	3.3%	41,295	38,883	1.15%	168.64	65.11	240	620	25	17°54′09″N 121°39′24″E
Allacapan		2nd	2.8%	35,234	33,571	0.92%	306.80	118.46	110	280	27	18°13′33″N 121°33′16″E
Amulung		3rd	4.0%	50,336	47,860	0.97%	264.51	102.13	190	490	47	17°50′14″N 121°43′24″E
Aparri		1st	5.4%	68,839	65,649	0.91%	286.64	110.67	240	620	42	18°21′26″N 121°38′14″E
Baggao		4th	6.9%	87,753	82,782	1.12%	995.49	384.36	88	230	48	18°16′16″N 121°40′48″E
Ballesteros		2nd	2.7%	34,488	34,299	0.10%	120.00	46.33	290	750	19	18°24′36″N 121°30′55″E
Buguey		1st	2.5%	32,148	30,175	1.21%	164.50	63.51	200	520	30	18°17′11″N 121°50′05″E
Calayan		2nd	1.4%	17,410	16,702	0.79%	494.53	190.94	35	91	12	19°15′43″N 121°28′33″E
Camalaniugan		1st	2.0%	25,236	24,923	0.24%	76.50	29.54	330	850	28	18°16′30″N 121°40′28″E
Claveria		2nd	2.5%	31,900	29,921	1.23%	194.80	75.21	160	410	41	18°36′32″N 121°05′02″E
Enrile		3rd	2.9%	36,705	35,834	0.46%	166.60	64.32	220	570	22	17°33′39″N 121°41′22″E
Gattaran		1st	4.6%	58,874	56,661	0.73%	707.50	273.17	83	210	50	18°03′41″N 121°38′36″E
Gonzaga		1st	3.3%	41,680	38,892	1.33%	567.43	219.09	73	190	25	18°15′34″N 121°59′37″E
Iguig		3rd	2.4%	30,060	27,862	1.46%	109.90	42.43	270	700	23	17°45′09″N 121°44′17″E
Lal-lo		1st	3.8%	48,733	44,506	1.74%	702.80	271.35	69	180	35	18°12′05″N 121°39′39″E
Lasam		2nd	3.2%	41,225	39,135	1.00%	213.70	82.51	190	490	30	18°03′52″N 121°36′05″E
Pamplona		2nd	2.0%	24,781	23,596	0.94%	209.67	80.95	120	310	18	18°27′49″N 121°20′28″E
Peñablanca		4th	4.0%	50,300	48,584	0.66%	1,246.23	481.17	40	100	24	17°37′32″N 121°47′07″E
Piat		2nd	2.0%	24,805	23,597	0.96%	181.81	70.20	140	360	18	17°47′30″N 121°28′37″E
Rizal		2nd	1.5%	19,077	17,994	1.12%	124.40	48.03	150	390	29	17°50′45″N 121°20′45″E
Sanchez-Mira		2nd	2.1%	26,164	24,541	1.23%	218.77	84.47	120	310	18	18°33′33″N 121°14′05″E
Santa Ana		1st	2.8%	35,688	32,906	1.56%	440.81	170.20	81	210	16	18°27′27″N 122°08′33″E
Santa Praxedes		2nd	0.3%	4,434	4,154	1.25%	78.11	30.16	57	150	10	18°33′47″N 120°59′24″E
Santa Teresita		1st	1.5%	19,573	19,038	0.53%	166.98	64.47	120	310	13	18°14′55″N 121°54′33″E
Santo Niño (Faire)		2nd	2.2%	28,537	27,219	0.90%	423.13	163.37	67	170	31	17°53′02″N 121°34′09″E
Solana		3rd	7.0%	88,445	82,502	1.33%	234.60	90.58	380	980	38	17°39′03″N 121°41′27″E
Tuao		3rd	5.0%	63,970	61,535	0.74%	225.82	87.19	280	730	32	17°44′05″N 121°27′19″E
Tuguegarao City	†	4th	13.1%	166,334	153,502	1.54%	144.80	55.91	1,100	2,800	49	17°36′45″N 121°43′58″E
Total				1,268,603	1,199,320	1.08%	9,398.07	3,628.62	130	340	820	(see GeoGroup box)
1. Former names are italicized.; 2. Coordinates mark the city/town center, and are sortable by latitude.

=== Barangays ===
The 28 municipalities and 1 city of the province comprise a total of 820 barangays, with Ugac Sur in Tuguegarao City as the most populous in 2010, and Centro 15 (Poblacion) in Aparri as the least. If cities are excluded, Maura in Aparri has the highest population.

=== Climate ===
Cagayan has a tropical savannah climate (Aw) with hot days and warm nights that last year round.

Climate data for Cagayan
Month	Jan	Feb	Mar	Apr	May	Jun	Jul	Aug	Sep	Oct	Nov	Dec	Year
Mean daily maximum °C (°F)	27.9 (82.2)	29.1 (84.4)	30.9 (87.6)	32.7 (90.9)	33.2 (91.8)	33.8 (92.8)	33.5 (92.3)	33.1 (91.6)	32.6 (90.7)	31.8 (89.2)	30.4 (86.7)	28.3 (82.9)	31.4 (88.6)
Mean daily minimum °C (°F)	20.6 (69.1)	21.8 (71.2)	22.3 (72.1)	23.8 (74.8)	24.7 (76.5)	24.8 (76.6)	24.9 (76.8)	24.6 (76.3)	24.2 (75.6)	23.9 (75.0)	22.8 (73.0)	21.5 (70.7)	23.3 (74.0)
Average rainy days	8	4	3	2	6	6	7	8	10	9	11	11	85
Source: Storm247

== Demographics ==
Population census of Cagayan
Year	Pop.	±% p.a.
1903	147,946	—
1918	191,320	+1.73%
1939	292,270	+2.04%
1948	311,088	+0.70%
1960	445,289	+3.03%
1970	581,237	+2.70%
1975	644,075	+2.08%
1980	711,476	+2.01%
1990	829,867	+1.55%
1995	895,050	+1.43%
2000	993,580	+2.26%
2007	1,072,571	+1.06%
2010	1,124,773	+1.74%
2015	1,199,320	+1.23%
2020	1,268,603	+1.19%
2024	1,284,676	+0.30%
Source: Philippine Statistics Authority

The population of Cagayan in the 2024 census was 1,284,676 people, with a density of 140 inhabitants per square kilometre or 360 inhabitants per square mile.

The majority of people living in Cagayan are of Ilocano descent, mostly from migrants coming from the Ilocos Region. Originally, the more numerous groups were the Ibanags, who were first sighted by the Spanish explorers and converted to Christianity by missionaries, the reason why the Ibanag language had spread throughout the valley region prior to the arrival of the migrating Ilocanos. Cagayan is predominantly Roman Catholic with 85% of the population affiliated and the Aglipayan Church has a very strong minority in the province. The Iglesia Ni Cristo has three ecclesiastical districts in the province with 4-5% of the population.

Aside from Ilocanos and Ibanags, Malawegs, Itawits, Gaddangs, Isnags, groups of nomadic Aetas, as well as families of Ibatans who have assimilated into the Ibanag-Ilocano culture make Cagayan their home; Ibatans are native to Babuyan Island. More recently, a new group from the south, the Muslim Filipinos, have migrated to this province and have made a community for themselves. In addition to this, Tagalog-speaking peoples from Central Luzon and Southern Luzon have also settled in the area, as well as a few Pangasinans and Kapampangans from the central plains, and Cebuanos and Hiligaynons from Visayas and Mindanao.

=== Languages ===
Languages Spoken (2000)
Language	Speakers
Ilocano	680,256
Ibanag	177,499
Itawit	84,382
Tagalog	28,961

Major languages spoken are Ilocano followed by Ibanag, Yogad and Gaddang. Ilocanos and Ibanags speak Ilocano with an Ibanag accent, as descendants of Ilocanos from first generation in Cagayan who lived within Ibanag population learned Ibanag; same situation with Ilocano tinged by Gaddang, Paranan, Yogad, and Itawis accents when descendants of Ilocanos from first generation in Cagayan who lived within Gaddang, Paranan, Yogad, and Itawis populations learned their languages. People especially in the capital and commercial centers speak and understand English and Tagalog/Filipino. Tagalogs, Ilocanos, and Ibanags speak Tagalog with an Ibanag accent, as descendants of Tagalogs from the first generation in Cagayan who lived within Ibanag population learned Ibanag. Other languages native to the province are Isnag, Itawis, & Ivatan, the latter is native in Babuyan Island. Languages not native in the province are also spoken there such as Maranao, Maguindanaon, Tausug, Pangasinan, Kapampangan, Cebuano and Hiligaynon to varying degrees by their respective ethnic communities within the province.

There are two endangered indigenous languages in Cagayan. These are the Dupaninan Agta language (with fewer than 1400 remaining speakers) and the Central Cagayan Agta language (with fewer than 799 remaining speakers); both of these are listed as Vulnerable according to the UNESCO Atlas of the World's Endangered Languages. All remaining speakers of the languages are among the community's elders. Without a municipality-wide teaching mechanism of the two endangered languages for the youth where the languages are present, the languages may be extinct within 3-5 decades, making them languages in grave peril unless a teaching-mechanism is established by either the government or an educational institution in the municipalities of Gattaran and Baggao.

== Economy ==
Poverty incidence of Cagayan (%)

Source: Philippine Statistics Authority

Agricultural products are rice, corn, peanut, beans, and fruits. Livestock products include cattle, hogs, carabaos, and poultry. Fishing various species of fish from the coastal towns is also undertaken. Woodcraft furniture made of hardwood, rattan, bamboo, and other indigenous materials are also available in the province.

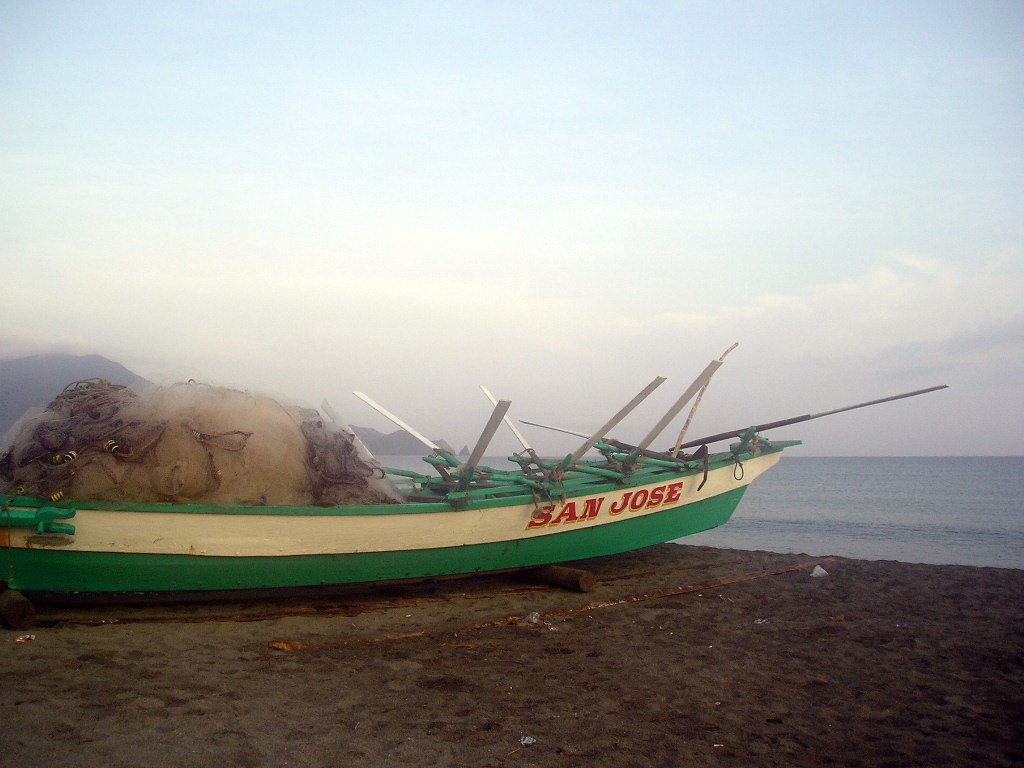
Fishing boat in Claveria

The Northern Cagayan International Airport, in Lal-lo, was built to support the Cagayan Special Economic Zone in northern Cagayan, which also serves seaborne traffic through Port Irene. The airport project involved the construction of a 2,200-meter runway, with a width of 45 meters, following the standards of the International Civil Aviation Organization. Completed in October 2014, the international airport can accommodate large aircraft such as the Airbus A319-100 and Boeing regional jets of comparable size.

Dos Hermanas Islands, Palaui, Santa Ana

=== Tourism ===
Since Cagayan faces the Philippine Sea, an extensive shoreline sprawls along the northern coastal towns of Sanchez Mira, Pamplona, Santa Praxedes, Claveria, Buguey, Aparri, Ballesteros, Abulug, and the islands of Palaui, Fuga, and island municipality of Calayan. Sanchez Mira, Claveria, and Santa Praxedes have facilities for excursion stays while Fuga Island is being developed as a world-class recreation and tourism center. Activities include whale watching at the Calayan Islands, and scuba diving, snorkeling and fishing in Palaui Island of Santa Ana. The airstrip at Claveria could be used as a jump-off point to Fuga Island.

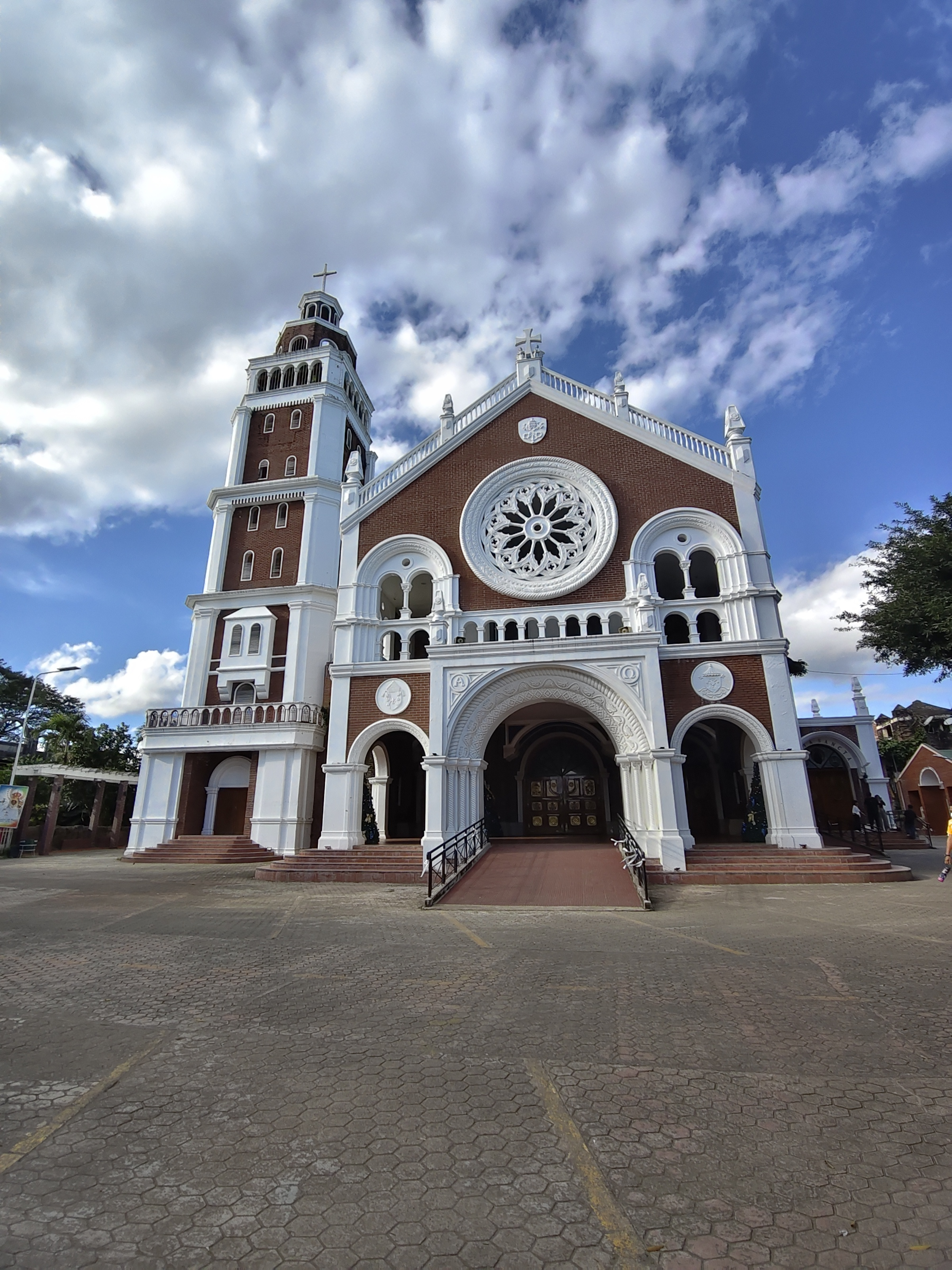
Minor Basilica of Our Lady of Piat

The Sambali Festival is celebrated throughout the province in commemoration of its founding. Hotels include the Governors Garden Hotel, Hotel Candice, Hotel Roma and Hotel Kimikarlai all in Tuguegarao City.

The Basilica Minore of Our Lady of Piat in the Municipality of Piat, is a major pilgrimage site in the province and houses the centuries-old image of Our Lady of Piat, known as the "Mother of Cagayan." Referred to as the "Pilgrimage Center of the North," it attracts thousands of devotees annually, particularly during its feast day in July.

Claveria is host to several scenic attractions which include: the Lakay-Lakay Lagoon, the rocky formation along the Camalaggaon Caves, the Roadside Park overlooking the Claveria Bay, Macatel Falls with its clear waters that run in abundance throughout the year, the Pata Lighthouse, and the Claveria Beach Resort along the white sand coasts.

== Flag ==
The flag of the province of Cagayan is a horizontal triband of blue, gold and green, charged with the provincial coat-of-arms ringed by 29 white, five-pointed stars. It was adopted on March 11, 1970, by virtue of Provincial Board Resolution No. 319.

Cagayan is one of the few Philippine provinces to have a distinctly-designed flag, deviating from the standard flag design of the provincial seal on a colored field. The flag has a proportion of 1:2, the same as the flag of the Philippines.

=== Symbolism ===
The colors of the flag have the following symbolism:

- The provincial flag of Cagayan.
  Sky blue: signifies justice, honor, and nobility of the province's inhabitants, their sincerity and traditionally peaceful ways. Also represents the azure skies.
- Gold: symbolizes the wealth of the province and represents the color of the bright sun.
- Green: depicts the fertile soil of the province and also seeks to inspire hope among the people. It also represents the verdant mountains and plains of the province.

The 29 white, five-pointed stars ringing the coat-of-arms represent the 29 component cities and municipalities comprising the province.

The coat-of-arms has the following symbolism:

- Yellow (or Gold) color: symbolizes the wealth of the province
- Blue color: stands for justice, honor, nobility of the people, their sincerity and traditional peaceful ways;
- Blue column dividing the shield: depicts the Cagayan River, which served as the border between the two original congressional districts of Cagayan;
- Small islands at the top portion of the shield: represent the small islands on the northern part of the province;
- Tobacco plants (left) and rice stalks (right): represent agriculture; rice and tobacco—along with corn and peanuts—are the province's main agricultural crops, and are major sources of income for its people.

=== Specifications ===
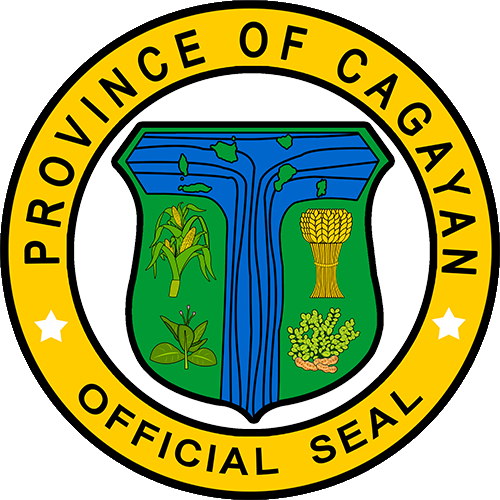
Provincial seal of Cagayan.

The length of the flag is twice its width, and the horizontal stripes are of equal size.

The coat-of-arms (shield) is drawn in a black outline, and placed off-centered towards the hoist of the flag. The shield's height is approximately 1 and 1/4 the width of any of the stripes (or 5/12 of the flag width). The shield's width is calculated to be at 5/14 of the flag width (or 5/28 of the flag length), given that the specification for the width-to-height ratio of the shield is set at 6:7.

The position of the shield in the flag is determined by first measuring two shield widths (5/7 of the flag width, or 5/14 of the flag length) from the edge of the fly, and then centering the shield in the remainder of the field. The exact horizontal position of the center of the shield is therefore at a point measuring 9/28 of the flag length from the hoist. The shield abuts the blue stripe, straddles the gold stripe, and extends into the green stripe.

== Government ==
Current Provincial Government Officials (2025-2028)

- Governor: Edgar B. Aglipay (Nacionalista)
- Vice-Governor: Manuel N. Mamba (Nacionalista)

Sangguniang Panlalawigan Members

1st District

- Rowena G. Retoma (Lakas)
- Kamille Concepcion P. Perez (Lakas)
- Romeo S. Garcia (Nacionalista)

2nd District

- Randy A. Ursulam (Lakas)
- Alniñoson Kevin M. Timbas (Lakas)
- Vilmer V. Viloria (Lakas)

3rd District

- Jean Alphonse D. Ponce (Lakas)
- Engelbert C. Caronan Jr. (Nacionalista)
- Romar F. De Asis (Nacionalista)
- Leonides M. Fausto Jr. (Lakas)

Ex-Officio Members

- Bryan Paul vargas (President, Liga ng mga Barangay)
- Ma. Rosario B. Soriano (President, PCL)
- Rey Jirowell D. Alameda (President, Panlalawigang Pederasyon ng Sangguniang Kabataan)

== House of Representatives ==
District	Representative	Party	Term	Bloc
1st	Ramon C. Nolasco	PFP	1	Majority
2nd	Baby Aline Vargas-Alfonso	PFP	2	Majority
3rd	Joseph L. Lara	Lakas	3	Majority

== Notable personalities ==
- Danilo Ulep – Catholic Bishop From Tuguegarao
- Ramon Paul L. Hernando – Associate Justice of the Supreme Court from Tuguegarao
- Ricardo Baccay – Bishop Emeritus of Alaminos City and current Archbishop of Tuguegarao
- Robert Empedrad – Former Chief, Philippine Navy from Tuguegarao
- Sofronio Bancud – Bishop of Cabanatuan from Tuguegarao
- Eulogio Balao - former Secretary of the Department of National Defense and former Senator from Tuguegarao.
- Orestes Ojeda - film actor and an art enthusiast, who was born and raised in Tuguegarao.
- Lucho Ayala - Filipino Actor from Tuguegarao City
- Rommel Adducul - former professional basketball player. From Tuguegarao
- Eulogio Balao - Filipino soldier and politician. From Tuguegarao
- Noel A. Coballes - military officer
- Troy Rosario - professional basketball player for Barangay Ginebra San Miguel of the PBA from Abulug
- Melecio Arranz – Former Senator from Alcala
- Francisco Roman – Revolutionary leader from Alcala
- Maja Salvador – Actress, Singer and Model from Aparri
- Kakai Bautista - actress and comedian from Aparri .
- Cesar Adib Majul - historian from Aparri
- Edgar Aglipay – Former PNP Chief from Calamaniugan
- Arthur Tugade – Secretary of Transportation from Claveria
- Lincoln Cortez Velasquez - known as CongTV, vlogger from Claveria.
- Juan Ponce Enrile - Former Defense Secretary and senator from Gonzaga.
- Lilia Cuntapay - actress, also known as the "Queen of Philippine Horror Films", from Gonzaga.
- Bretman Rock - Filipino content creator based in Hawaii, USA, known for his beauty and lifestyle videos. From Sanchez Mira

== See also ==
- Callao Man
- Our Lady of Piat
- Malaueg Church
- Roman Catholic Archdiocese of Tuguegarao
- Lal-lo and Gattaran Shell Middens
