= Peñablanca Protected Landscape and Seascape =

Protected area in Philippines

- IUCN category V (protected landscape/seascape)
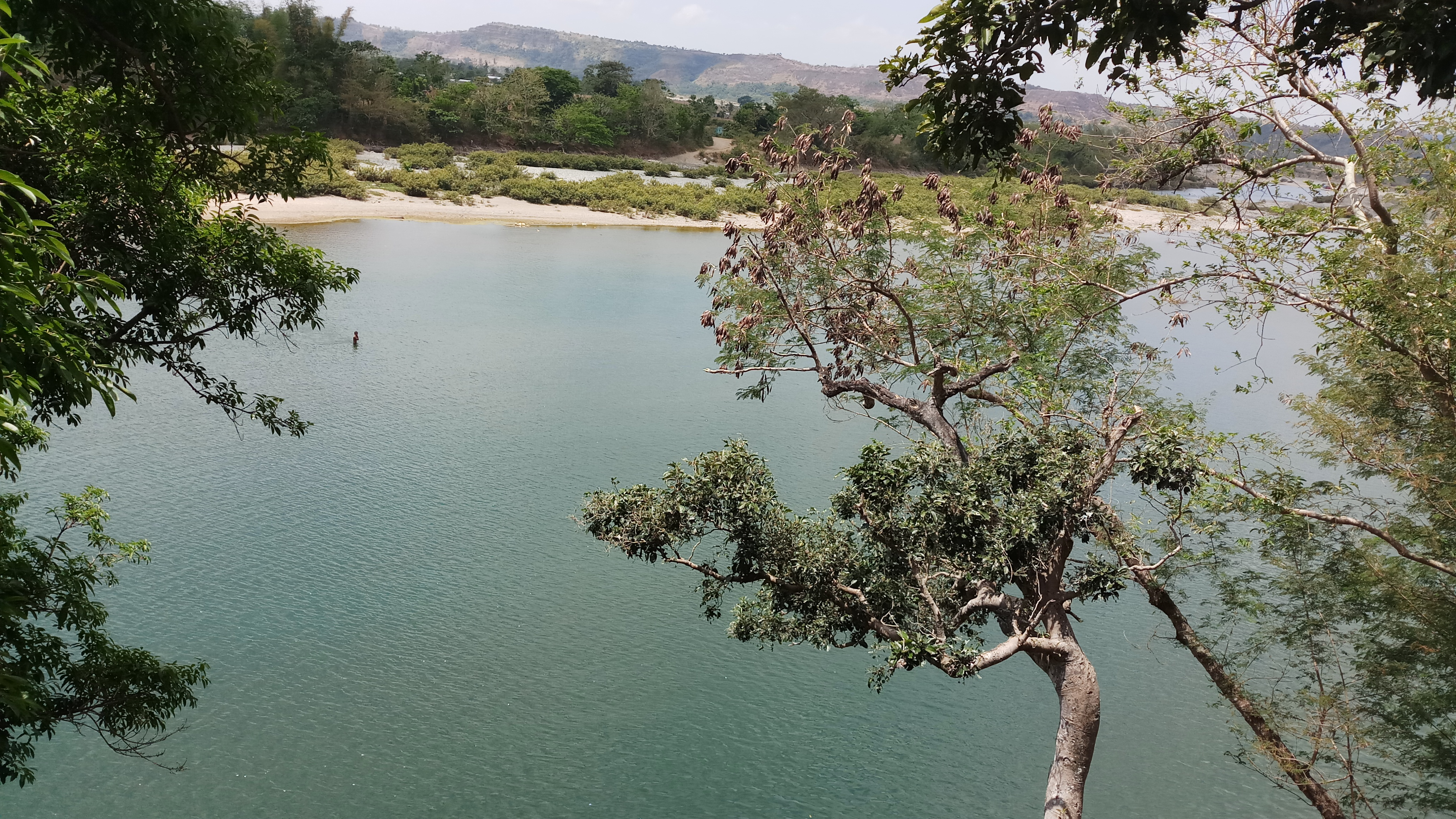
- View of Pinacanauan River from the entrance to Callao Cave

- Location within Philippines
- Location: Cagayan, Philippines
- Nearest city: Tuguegarao
- Coordinates: 17°42′11.74″N 121°49′25.5″E
- Area: 118,781.582 hectares (293,515.68 acres)
- Established: July 16, 1935 (National park); July 8, 1940 (Forest reserve); June 29, 1994 (Protected landscape); October 6, 2003 (Protected landscape/seascape)
- Governing body: Department of Environment and Natural Resources

The Peñablanca Protected Landscape and Seascape (formerly known as the Callao Cave National Park) is a protected area and national park in Peñablanca, Cagayan. It is on the border with Isabela province, contiguous with the Northern Sierra Madre Natural Park. The protected area, best known as the location of Callao Cave, covers the largest block of forest under conservation in the province. It covers 118,781.582 hectares (293,515.68 acres) of the northern Sierra Madre mountain range and its adjacent Pacific coast.

The protected area is home to the Callao Cave Eco-Tourism Zone being promoted by the locals as the 'Caving Adventure Capital of the Philippines'. More than 300 caves dot the protected area, 75 of which have been documented by the National Museum since 1977. The area is easily accessible by automobile.

== History ==
Callao Cave was visited by American Governor-General Theodore Roosevelt Jr. in 1932 who under his term created the National Park system of the country with the passing of Act No. 3195 in 1932. Callao Cave was one of the earliest national parks in the country when it was established on July 16, 1935, by Proclamation no. 827. The Callao Cave National Park encompassed an area of 192 hectares (470 acres) of land. With the passing of the NIPAS Act of 1992 that revamped the protected areas of the country, the Callao National Park was reclassified but enlarged by Proclamation no. 416 on June 29, 1994. The protected area was reestablished as the Peñablanca Protected Landscape.

In 2003 upon the recommendation of the Department of Environment and Natural Resources (DENR), the protected area was further enlarged to include certain parcels of land in the public domain. Proclamation 416 no. was amended by Proclamation no. 484, signed by President Arroyo on October 6, 2003. The law enlarged the park to 118,781.58 hectares (293,515.7 acres) and renamed as the Peñablanca Protected Landscape and Seascape (PPLS).

The protected area is particularly described as bounded on the North and East of Public Forest under FR-1011 per Proclamation No. 584 dated July 8, 1940; on the South by Callao Reforestation Project and on the West by Block I, Alienable and Disposable of Cagayan Project No. 13-C, Certified on February 27, 1923.

Since June 22, 2018, the protected area has been designated as a national park through the Expanded National Integrated Protected Areas System (ENIPAS) Act or Republic Act No. 11038 which was signed by President Rodrigo Duterte.

== Description ==
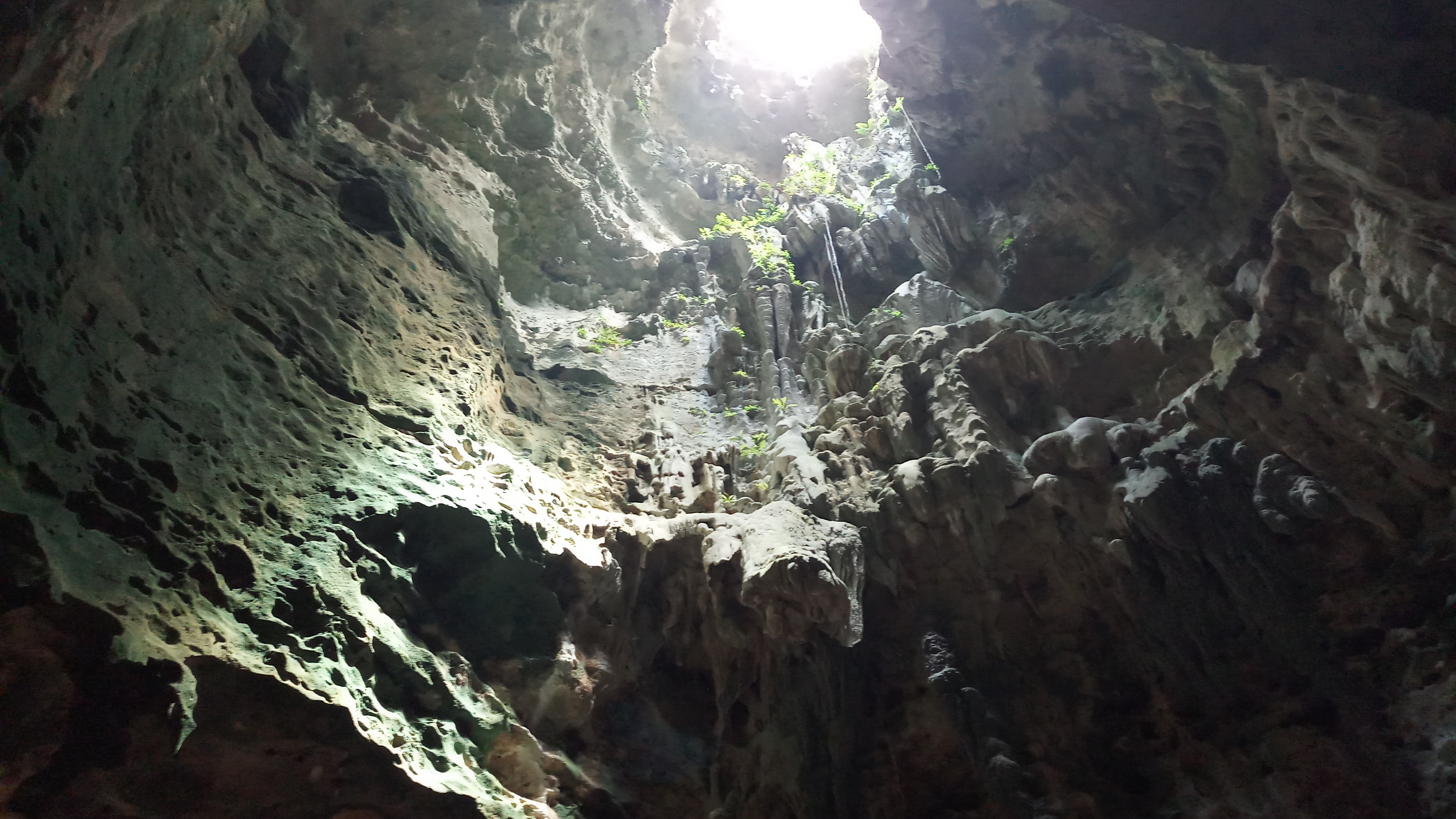
Callao Cave at the Peñablanca protected area

The Peñablanca park is situated just 24 kilometres (15 mi) east of Cagayan's provincial capital of Tuguegarao and some 580 kilometres (360 mi) north of Manila. It extends along the northern Sierra Madre range from the Twin Peaks south to Mount Cetaceo towards the border with Isabela. It covers 18 of the 24 barangays of Peñablanca, namely, Callao, San Roque, Cabbo, Nannarian, Malibagbag, Quibal, Agugaddan, Lapi, Nanguilattan, Nabbabalayan, Buyon, Mangga, Minanga, Sisim, Bugatay, Bical, Baliuag and Cabasan.

The park is well known for its numerous limestone formations found within its 300 cave systems, the most popular of which are Callao Cave and Sierra Cave. It is traversed by the Pinacanauan River, a major tributary of the Rio Grande de Cagayan, which supplies clean water and irrigation to surrounding communities as well as the nearby city of Tuguegarao. The park is inhabited by three indigenous groups, namely the Ibanag, Itawes and Aeta. It is also known for its archaeological relics discovered within its caves.

== Tourism ==
The Callao Cave Eco-Tourism Zone is being promoted by the locals as the 'Caving Adventure Capital of the Philippines' since it has more than 300 caves including the mother Callao Cave. To accelerate the development of the Callao Cave ETZ, the Provincial Tourism Office of Cagayan has tied up with several Non-Government Organizations (NGOs) such the Sierra Madre Outdoor Club (SMOC), Cagayan visitors bureau, souvenir makers, and other interested investors to help make Callao Caves tourist zone more develop and beautiful. One of the projects they established with Cagayan visitors bureau is the establishment of a visitor center at the cottage area.

The SMOC also assists tourists in recreational activities like caving, spelunking, mountain climbing, trekking, kayaking, rappelling, swimming, circadian flight viewing, and picnicking. The group also offers their facilities for tourism whenever needed, such as the souvenir makers displaying souvenir items at the cave site.

The Department of Tourism also gave a boat and a floating picnic house to the residents of the place for a livelihood. The office also augmented the trainings and seminars conducted by the provincial tourism office to the tourist guides, guards, and personnel manning the zone. The tourism office staff were also arranging partnerships with other organizations and agencies to rebuild the deteriorating facilities of the Callao Caves cottages for trainings, seminars, conventions, and other uses.

As of 2013, the Callao Caves Resort located across Pinacanauan River from the caves, is the only accommodation available in the Callao Cave Tourism Zone.

== Caves ==
=== Callao Cave ===
Callao Cave is the premier attraction in the Peñablanca Protected Landscape and Seascape. It is the most accessible of all the caves, its entrance is reached by climbing 184 concrete steps. The Callao Cave system is composed of seven chambers, each with natural crevices above that let streams of light into the cave, serving as illumination for the otherwise dark areas of the place. Previously, there were reported to be nine caves in the system, but an earthquake in the 1980s cut off the last two chambers.

Other pristine and undisturbed caves with living rock formations in the area include Jackpot, Laurente, Odessa-Tumbali, Quibal, Roc, San Carlos, and Sierra Caves, among others. These caves may be explored with guides from Sierra Madre Outdoor Club, Adventures and Expedition Philippines Inc., and North Adventurer. Daily circadian flight of bats from the Bat Cave occurs at dusk.

=== Jackpot Cave ===
Jackpot Cave in Sitio Tumallo, Bgy. Quibal also Peńablanca, is allegedly the country's second deepest cave with a surveyed depth of approximately 115 m (377 ft) and a surveyed length of 355 m (1,165 ft). It has a walking passage, winding streams and various-sized pools, multi-depth shafts, and drops for many rope works.

=== Odessa-Tumbali Cave ===
The Odessa-Tumbali Cave System, also called Abbenditan Cave by local residents, is one of the longest cave systems in the Philippines. Its estimated length is approximately 12.6 to 15 km (7.8 to 9.3 mi) with only about 7.65 km (4.75 mi) fully explored. The cave has five different entrances and is rated by spelunkers as difficult for its narrow and flood-prone passages. The cave has various formations, passageways, lakes, and canals that provide for excellent wet sport spelunking and great opportunities for cave photography. The cave is also home to a variety of wildlife. It may be explored with guides from the Sierra Madre Outdoor Club (SMOC). The cave is located in Sitio Abbenditan in Barangay Quibal also in Peñablanca.

To get to the Odessa-Tumbali includes hiking about 7 km (4.3 mi) from Callao to get to the entrance then rappelling about 30 m (98 ft) into a sinkhole.

=== San Carlos Cave ===
San Carlos Cave is one of the toughest caves in the country to conquer as spelunkers require a lot of cave crawling. A chamber called Ice Cream Parlor contains clusters of white stalagmites that resemble scooped ice cream. The John the Baptist chamber has a sump where one must take a deep breath and swim to the other side of the chamber, avoiding sharp and rough stones that could scratch skin and tear clothing. San Carlos requires a lot of swimming because more than half the cave is covered by a cold running subterranean river.

=== Sierra Cave ===
Sierra Cave has two entrances - one for tourists and another for experienced cavers. The biggest challenge is crawling through a very low and narrow opening called Celica’s Passage. Cavers though are rewarded by formations inside that include flowstones, columns, and draperies.

Hermoso Tuliao Cave

A rock art of a human-like figure is found in Hermoso Tuliao Cave. The rock art, about 3,500 years old, shows a human-like figure with arms up and legs spread open. It is believed to have been created by either early Austronesians or the Agta Negritos who migrated during the Ice Age.

== Biodiversity ==
The Peñablanca park has a total 34,380.9 hectares (84,957 acres) of old growth forest, 14,890.4 hectares (36,795 acres) of secondary forest and 6,122.9 hectares (15,130 acres) of mossy forest. It supports a variety of wildlife, including the endangered Philippine Eagle. Along the park's Pacific coastline are several blocks of undisturbed mangroves and rich coral reef system.

As a key biodiversity area, the park is home to several other threatened and restricted-range birds such as the flame-breasted fruit dove, spotted imperial pigeon, Isabela oriole, green racquet-tail, Philippine eagle-owl, whiskered pitta, Philippine duck, celestial monarch, Luzon water-redstart, ashy-breasted flycatcher, and green-faced parrotfinch. Non-bird population includes the Philippine deer, Philippine crocodile, Malay civet cat, Sierra Madre shrew-mouse, Luzon pygmy fruit bat, and Northern Luzon cloud rat.

The park's forest cover is composed of Dipterocarp trees such as narra, molave, agosip, ipil-ipil, balete, tindalo and anabiong.

== Activities ==
Activities within the park include hiking, spelunking, fishing, swimming, and other water activities. Near the entrance to Callao Cave is the Callao Park and Resort, developed and maintained by the Cagayan Provincial Government, which has several cottages, a two-storey hotel, a multi-purpose pavilion, viewing deck and picnic tables.

The Pinacanauan River bisects the protected area and the limestone formations. The base of Callao Cave is located along the river bank. The pristine river is conducive for river rafting, boating, kayaking, fishing, and swimming while the nearby mountains are perfect for trekking and mountaineering.

== Accessibility ==
For the fiscal year 2012, the Department of Public Works and Highways (DWPH) and the Department of Tourism (DOT) were allocated ₱100-million by the Philippine government for the improvement of Peñablanca-Callao Cave Road, the only road to the caves. The scope of the joint project involves the widening of 8 km (5.0 mi) including asphalting. The project is one of the two road projects approved to boost the tourism industry in Cagayan Valley Region or Region II. The DPWH and DOT are mandated to develop and enhance road networks leading to tourism sites by virtue of Republic Act No. 9593 or Tourism Act of 1999. The development of the road network leading to the tourist spots will accelerate development activities in the province and nearby areas.
