= Pinacanauan River =

River in Cagayan, Philippines

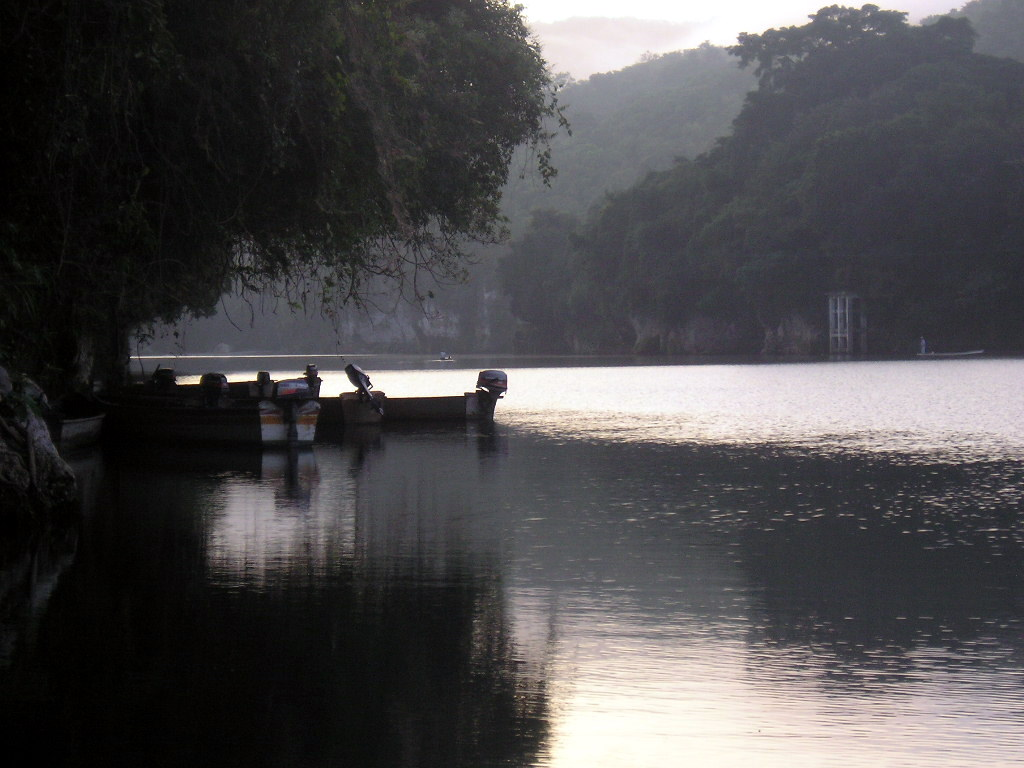

- Location within Luzon Location within Philippines

Location
- Country: Philippines
- Region: Cagayan Valley
- Province: Cagayan
- City/municipality: Peñablanca; Tuguegarao

Physical characteristics
- Mouth: Cagayan River
  - location: Tuguegarao
  - coordinates: 17°36′18″N 121°43′50″E
- Length: 82.6 km (51.3 mi)
- Basin size: 65,099 hectares (650.99 km^{2})

Basin features
- Progression: Pinacanauan–Cagayan
- River system: Pinacanauan Watershed

The Pinacanauan River, also known as the Pinacanauan de Tuguegarao, is a tributary of the Cagayan River located in the province in Cagayan, in the northern portion of Luzon in the Philippines. With a length of 46 kilometres (29 mi), the river originates in the Sierra Madre and passes through the Peñablanca Protected Landscape and Seascape, with large karst formations, underground chambers, and rare wild flora, before entering the Cagayan River in Tuguegarao, Cagayan. The Pinacanauan is considered one of the most scenic attractions in Cagayan, passing beside the Callao Cave system.

Due to its moderate to medium-quick rapid further upstream, it is a popular place for rafting and kayaking. The place is surrounded by mountains for hiking, climbing and spelunking. Boat races take place on this river every year on April 21.

The name Pinacanauan is also used to refer to three upstream tributaries of the Cagayan River in neighboring Isabela Province that also originate from the Sierra Madre. These are the Pinacanauan de Cabagan or the Pinacanauan de San Pablo, which stretches for 46 kilometers and joins the Cagayan River in the boundaries of the towns of San Pablo and Cabagan, the Pinacanauan de Tumauini, which stretches for 35 kilometers before joining the Cagayan River in Tumauini, and the Pinacanauan de Ilagan or the Ilagan River, which stretches for 40 kilometers before joining the Cagayan River in Ilagan.
