= Ibanag =

Ybanag may refer to:

- Ibanag people, ethnic group of the Philippines
- Ibanag language, Austronesian language of these people
