= San Mariano, Isabela =

Municipality in Isabela, Philippines

San Mariano
- Municipality
- Municipality of San Mariano
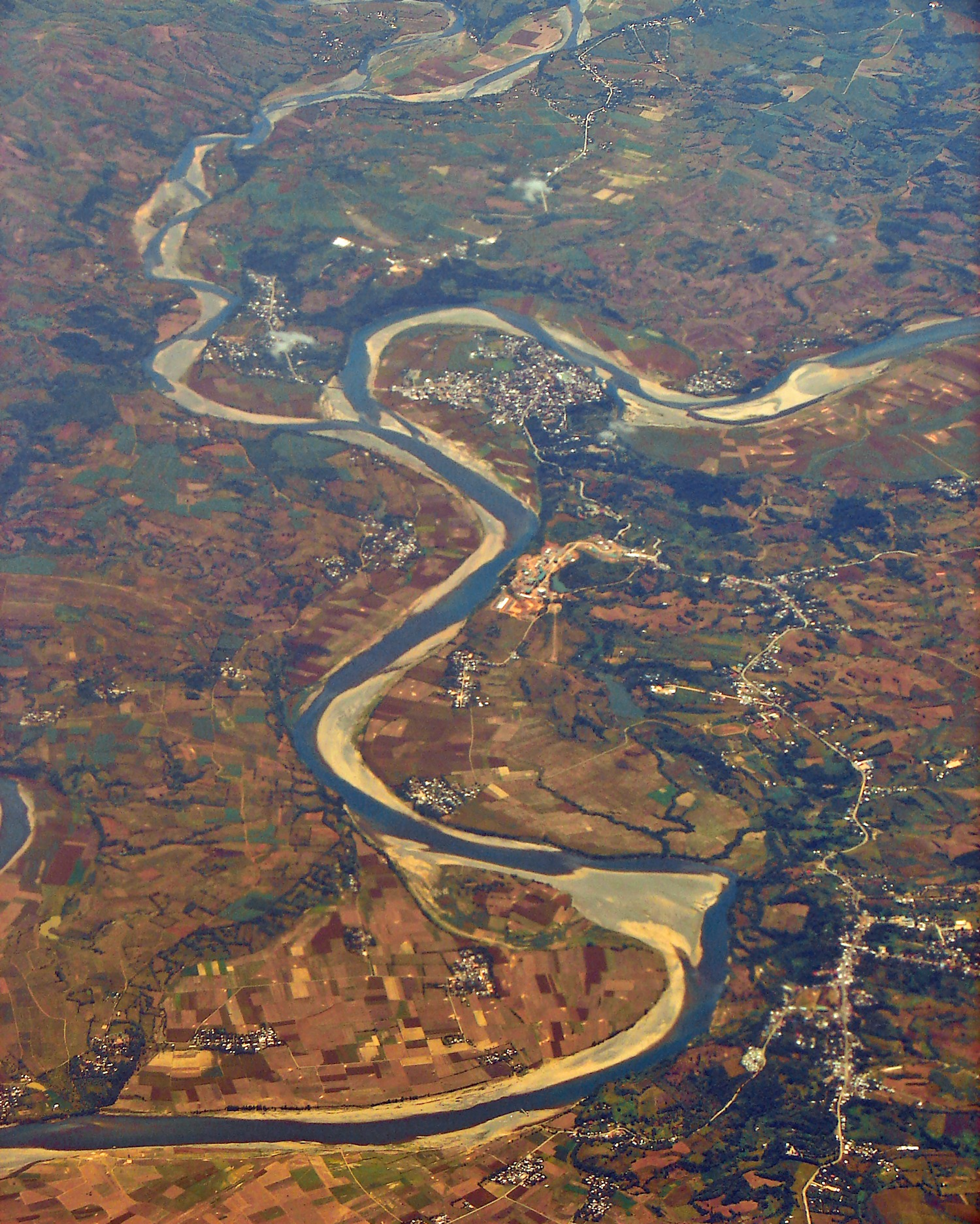
- Aerial view of San Mariano, with Benito Soliven in the foreground and the mighty Cagayan River.

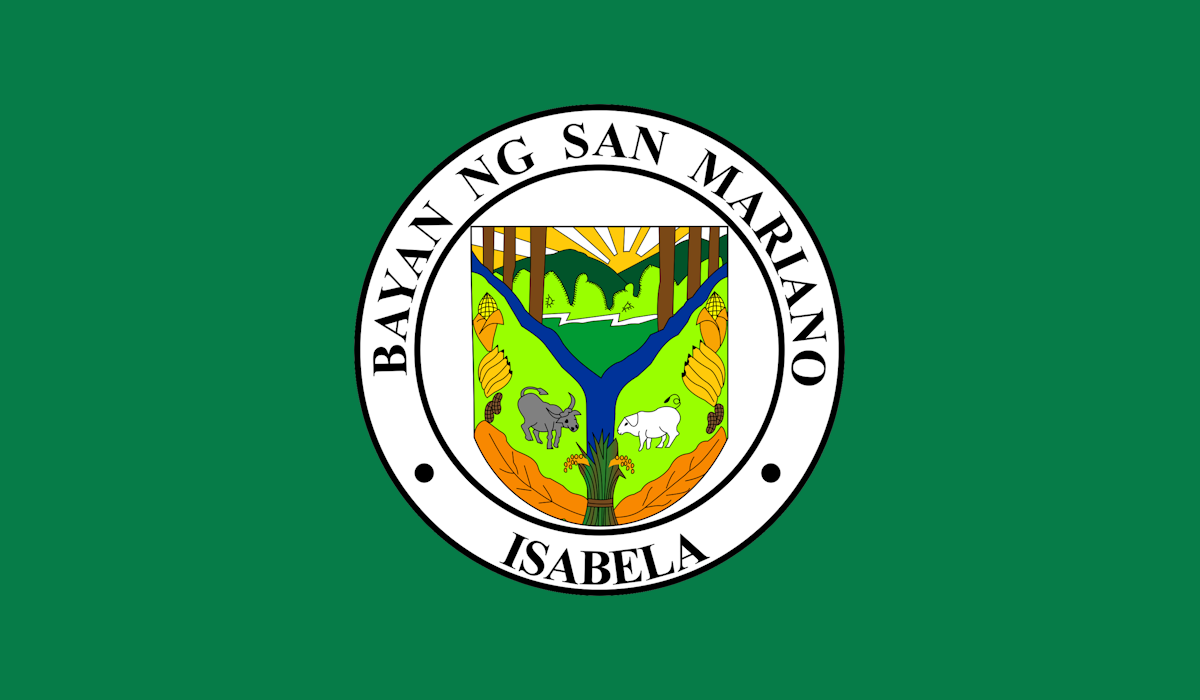
- Flag Seal
- Nickname: Rice Bowl of Isabela
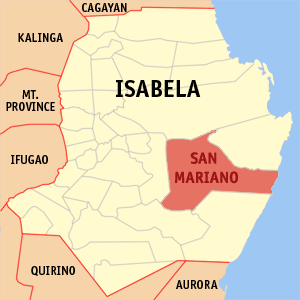
- Map of Isabela with San Mariano highlighted
- Interactive map of San Mariano
- Location within the Philippines
- Coordinates: 16°59′N 122°01′E
- Country: Philippines
- Region: Cagayan Valley
- Province: Isabela
- District: 2nd district
- Founded: 1954
- Barangays: 36 (see Barangays)

Government
  - Type: Sangguniang Bayan
  - Mayor: Ana Cristina S. Go
  - Vice Mayor: Edgar T. Go
  - Representative: Ed Christopher S. Go
  - Electorate: 35,730 voters (2025)

Area
  - Total: 1,469.50 km^{2} (567.38 sq mi)
- Elevation: 102 m (335 ft)
- Highest elevation: 363 m (1,191 ft)
- Lowest elevation: 28 m (92 ft)

Population (2024 census)
  - Total: 61,876
  - Density: 42.107/km^{2} (109.06/sq mi)
  - Households: 14,448

Economy
  - Income class: 1st municipal income class
  - Poverty incidence: 18.43% (2023)
  - Revenue: ₱ 603.6 million (2024)
  - Assets: ₱ 2,201 million (2024)
  - Expenditure: ₱ 504.8 million (2024)
  - Liabilities: ₱ 501.8 million (2024)

Service provider
  - Electricity: Isabela 2 Electric Cooperative (ISELCO 2)
- Time zone: UTC+8 (PST)
- ZIP code: 3332
- PSGC: 0203131000
- IDD : area code: +63 (0)78
- Native languages: Ilocano; Paranan; Tagalog
- Website: www.sanmariano-isabela.org

San Mariano, officially the Municipality of San Mariano (Ilocano: Ili ti San Mariano; Filipino: Bayan ng San Mariano), is a municipality in the province of Isabela, Philippines. According to the 2024 census, it has a population of 61,876 people.

The town is considered as the gateway to the Northern Sierra Madre Natural Park.

== Etymology ==
According to legend, it was first named Angela in reference to the wife of Mariano Kalingog whose family was one of the foremost settlers of the place. Angela drowned while she was washing clothes along the Pinacanauan River, bringing grief to her husband, who also died some years later. Since then, the village was known as San Mariano.

The area covered by San Mariano was part of a wide region that stretched from the edge of Ilagan to the Sierra Madre mountains called Catalangan, derived from the word talang (pine), possibly due to that tree's abundance in the Sierra Madre. It was officially established by the Spaniards as a mission in 1755.

== History ==
=== Establishment ===
San Mariano was once a barrio of Ilagan, the capital of Isabela.

In 1920, by virtue of Executive Order 25, San Mariano became a Municipal district, and with the passage of Philippines Legislature Act No. 3416 dated December 7, 1927, it was made a distinct and regular municipality.

=== Influx of Ilocano settlers ===
During those early decades of the 20th century, there was an influx of migrants coming from the provinces of Ilocos, Cagayan, and Pangasinan. These new settlers formed communities on agricultural lands on which they grew corn and other crops such as rice, root crops, different kinds of vegetables and bananas.

=== During the Marcos dictatorship ===
Isabela, including San Mariano, was one of the areas most heavily militarized during after Ferdinand Marcos declared Martial Law in 1972, and was not exempt from the Human rights abuses of the Marcos dictatorship. In 1985, three councilors from Barangay Ibujan in the municipality of San Mariano, including Ibanag community leader Luis Gabriel who had rejected overtures for the establishment of a local CHDF base in the town, were forcibly taken by heavily armed men who claimed that they needed the three as guides. However, the three were never seen again, and they eventually became counted among the many desaparecidos during the Marcos dictatorship.

=== Cultural history ===
When the German naturalist Carl Semper hiked the Sierra Madre mountains in May 1860, he observed early inhabitants who are known today as the Kalingas. He described the said group as a typical Filipino "cultural minority" who grew their own food, practiced their own religious rites, smithed their own tools, decorated their own artifacts with distinctive designs and traded forest products for metal and salt.

On the Pacific side of the mountains, Semper saw the "Negritos" and concluded that they were new arrivals because he observed no "Kalinga-Negrito" mestizos among them. They inhabited the forest close to the "Kalinga" settlements and showed up with games in seasonal periods to barter for agricultural products. Years later, some sociologists noted that there were inter-marriages entered into between these tribes.

These natives, however, were out-numbered by the mestizos or the "Ibanag-Kalinga," the Ibanags and Ilocanos with a ratio of about four to one. These settlers tilled permanent farms at the present-day Barangays of Disulap and Minanga.

There was also an influx of several groups from the Bicol and Tagalog regions during the logging concession boom. The continuing acculturation of these groups brought about social changes in the locality. The once verdant forest slowly became barren and denuded with the ceaseless illegal logging and kaingin system employed by the local people and new migrants. When the national government decided to impose a total log ban, the ethnic groups decided to settle in the remote areas of the municipality to farm their lands. The Bicolanos and Tagalogs moved out.

== Geography ==
San Mariano has a total land area of 146,950 hectares (363,100 acres). It constitutes 13.78 percent of the total land area of the province, and is the province's largest and the country's fourth largest municipality. It is a suburb of Ilagan, the provincial capital.

The municipality lies in the eastern part of the province of Isabela. It is bounded on the north by the Ilagan, on the east by Palanan, on the south by San Guillermo and on the west by Benito Soliven.

San Mariano is situated 37.45 kilometres (23.27 mi) from the provincial capital Ilagan, and 440.08 kilometres (273.45 mi) from the country's capital city of Manila.

=== Barangays ===
San Mariano is politically subdivided into 36 barangays. Each barangay consists of puroks while some have sitios.

- Alibadabad
- Balagan
- Binatug
- Bitabian
- Buyasan
- Cadsalan
- Casala
- Cataguing
- Daragutan East
- Daragutan West
- Del Pilar
- Dibuluan
- Dicamay
- Dipusu
- Disulap
- Disusuan
- Gangalan
- Ibujan
- Libertad
- Macayucayu
- Mallabo
- Marannao
- Minanga
- Old San Mariano
- Palutan
- Panninan
- Zone I (Poblacion)
- Zone II (Poblacion)
- Zone III (Poblacion)
- San Jose
- San Pablo
- San Pedro
- Santa Filomena
- Tappa
- Ueg
- Zamora

=== Climate ===
Climate data for San Mariano, Isabela
Month	Jan	Feb	Mar	Apr	May	Jun	Jul	Aug	Sep	Oct	Nov	Dec	Year
Mean daily maximum °C (°F)	29 (84)	30 (86)	32 (90)	35 (95)	35 (95)	35 (95)	34 (93)	33 (91)	32 (90)	31 (88)	30 (86)	28 (82)	32 (90)
Mean daily minimum °C (°F)	19 (66)	20 (68)	21 (70)	23 (73)	23 (73)	24 (75)	23 (73)	23 (73)	23 (73)	22 (72)	21 (70)	20 (68)	22 (71)
Average precipitation mm (inches)	31.2 (1.23)	23 (0.9)	27.7 (1.09)	28.1 (1.11)	113.5 (4.47)	141.4 (5.57)	176.4 (6.94)	236.6 (9.31)	224.9 (8.85)	247.7 (9.75)	222.9 (8.78)	178 (7.0)	1,651.4 (65)
Average rainy days	10	6	5	5	13	12	15	15	15	17	16	15	144
Source: World Weather Online

=== Existing general and urban land uses ===
Of the total land area of the municipality, built-up area constitutes 1,268 hectares or 0.86 percent with the Poblacion as the largest and most densely populated built-up area. Open grasslands occupy a total area of approximately 20,700 hectares representing about 14.09 percent. Generally, the open grasslands are flanked by either agricultural areas or forest areas. Vast forest areas of the municipality are mostly found at its eastern portion, which covers about 53.39 percent or an approximated area of 78,450.50 hectares. About 29,264 hectares or 19.91 percent are presently devoted to extensive agricultural activities with corn, rice and bananas as the major crops. Water bodies, including banks, buffer or salvage zones occupy an estimated 11.58 percent while existing roads and streets cover 2.17 percent of the municipality's total area.

== Demographics ==
Population census of San Mariano
Year	Pop.	±% p.a.
1918	1,486	—
1939	7,046	+7.69%
1948	8,365	+1.92%
1960	15,064	+5.02%
1970	20,227	+2.99%
1975	25,157	+4.47%
1980	31,839	+4.82%
1990	36,295	+1.32%
1995	37,861	+0.79%
2000	41,309	+1.89%
2007	44,718	+1.10%
2010	51,438	+5.23%
2015	55,370	+1.41%
2020	60,124	+1.75%
2024	61,876	+0.69%
Source: Philippine Statistics Authority

In the 2024 census, the population of San Mariano was 61,876 people, with a density of 41 inhabitants per square kilometre or 110 inhabitants per square mile.

== Economy ==
Poverty incidence of San Mariano (%)

Source: Philippine Statistics Authority

== Government ==
=== Local government ===
As a municipality in the Province of Isabela, government officials at the provincial and municipal levels are voted by the town. The provincial government has political jurisdiction over most local transactions of the municipal government.

The municipality of San Mariano is governed by a mayor, designated as its local chief executive, and by a municipal council as its legislative body in accordance with the Local Government Code. The mayor, vice mayor, and the municipal councilors are elected directly in polls held every three years.

Barangays are also headed by elected officials: Barangay Captain, Barangay Council, whose members are called Barangay Councilors. The barangays have SK federation which represents the barangay, headed by SK chairperson and whose members are called SK councilors. All officials are also elected every three years.

=== Elected officials ===
Members of the San Mariano Municipal Council (2025-2028)
Position	Name
District Representative	Ed Christopher S. Go
Municipal Mayor	Ana Cristina S. Go
Municipal Vice-Mayor	Edgar T. Go
Municipal Councilors	Philip Jimenez
Municipal Councilors	Dean Anthony G. Domalanta
Municipal Councilors	Jerimar Miranda
Municipal Councilors	JC Buguina Sumisim
Municipal Councilors	Monico Aggabao
Municipal Councilors	Girlie Go Warren
Municipal Councilors	Kevin L. Pascual
Municipal Councilors	Minette Miranda

=== Congress representation ===
San Mariano, belonging to the second legislative district of the province of Isabela, currently represented by Ed Christopher S. Go.

=== List of former chief executives ===
Leaders of Town	Date
Ferando Ampa	1924 - 1927
Placido Buensuceso	1927 - 1931
Eulogio Alejo	1931 - 1934
Elias Gabriel	1934 - 1945
Jose Miranda	1945 - 1947
Felicisimo Baua	1947 - 1963
Emilio Bueno	1964 - 1967
Jose Miranda	1967 - 1976
Carlos Dumelod	1976- 1980
Deodoro Go	1980
Carlos Dumelod	December 1980 - 1986
Aristotle Claravall	1986 - 1987
Romulo S. Taggueg Jr.	1987 - 1988
Deodoro Go	1988 - 1995
Jesus C. Miranda	1995 - 2004
Edgar T. Go	2004 - 2013
Dean Anthony Domalanta	2013 - 2016
Edgar T. Go	2016 - 2025
Ana Cristina S. Go	2025 - present

== Education ==
The Schools Division of Isabela governs the town's public education system. The division office is a field office of the DepEd in Cagayan Valley region. There are two schools district offices which govern the public and private elementary and high schools throughout the municipality, namely: San Mariano I Schools District, and San Mariano II Schools District.

=== Primary and elementary schools ===
- Alibadabad Elementary School
- Angela Elementary School
- Binatug Elementary School
- Bitabian Elementary School
- Buyasan Elementary School
- Casala Elementary School
- Cataguing Elementary School
- Caunayan Elementary School
- Daragutan East Elementary School
- Dibuluan Elementary School
- Dipusu Elementary School
- Disulap Elementary School
- Disusuan Elementary School
- Gangalan Elementary School
- Libertad Elementary School
- Luzcon Elementary School
- Macayucayu Elementary School
- Malaya Elementary School
- Mallabo Elementary School
- Palutan Elementary School
- San Mariano Central School SPED Center
- San Pablo Elementary School
- San Pedro Elementary Schoo
- Tappa Elementary School
- Udiao Elementary School
- Ueg Elementary School
- Villa Ancheta Elementary School
- Zamora Elementary School

=== Secondary schools ===
- Alibadabad National High School
- Balagan Integrated School
- Bitabian National High School
- Cadsalan Integrated School
- Daragutan East National High School
- Daragutan West Integrated School
- Del Pilar Integrated School
- Dicamay Integrated School
- Ibujan Integrated School
- Old San Mariano Integrated School
- Panninan Integrated School
- San Isidro Integrated School
- San Jose Integrated School
- San Mariano II Central Integrated School
- San Mariano National High School - Main
- San Mariano High School - Cataguing Extension
- Sta. Filomena Integrated School
- Ueg National High School
- Villa Miranda Integrated School

== Environment and Conservation ==
San Mariano is considered the main gateway to the Northern Sierra Madre Natural Park (NSMNP), the largest protected area in the Philippines. In 1999, a remnant wild population of the Philippine crocodile (Crocodylus mindorensis), one of the most endangered crocodiles in the world, was rediscovered in its wetlands and river systems.

Since then, San Mariano has become a center for community-based conservation. The municipality established local crocodile sanctuaries in areas such as Dunoy Lake, Disulap River, and Dinang Creek. These sites are now managed in partnership with the Mabuwaya Foundation, a nonprofit organization that works with local communities to conserve the Philippine crocodile and its habitat. The Foundation implements conservation programs through environmental education, protection and monitoring, and a successful “head-start” program in which hatchlings are raised in captivity and later released into the wild to improve survival rates.
