= Ilagan River =

River in north Luzon, Philippines

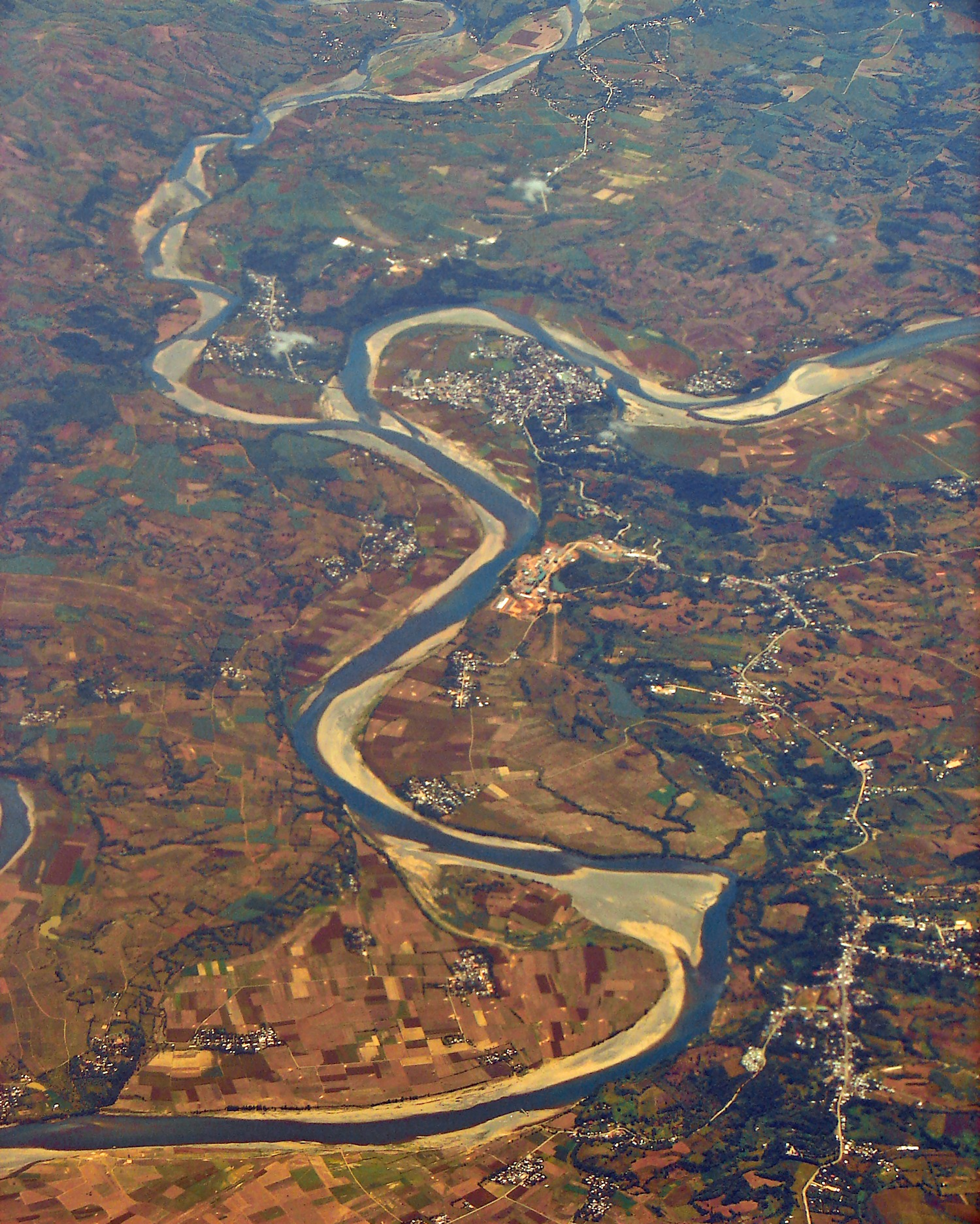
- The Ilagan River as it passes through the municipalities of San Mariano (background) and Benito Soliven (foreground).

- Ilagan River mouth Ilagan River (Philippines)
- Native name: Pinacauan De Ilagan (Ilocano)

Location
- Country: Philippines
- Region: Cagayan Valley
- Province: Isabela

Physical characteristics
- Source: Sierra Madre mountains
  - location: Casiguran, Aurora, Central Luzon
  - coordinates: 16°18′42″N 121°59′6″E
- Mouth: Cagayan River
  - location: Ilagan, Isabela
  - coordinates: 17°10′03″N 121°53′25″E
- Length: 189 km (117 mi)
- Basin size: 3,132 km^{2} (1,209 sq mi)
- Discharge
  - average: 270 m^{3}/s (9,500 cu ft/s)

Basin features
- Progression: Ilagan River – Cagayan River
- Tributaries
  - right: Abuan River; Bintacan River

The Ilagan River, also known as the Pinacanauan de Ilagan River, is a river in the province of Isabela, Cagayan Valley, Philippines. It is one of the major tributaries of the Cagayan River, the largest river in the Philippines. The Ilagan River originates from the western slopes of the Sierra Madre and drains the eastern central portion of the Cagayan River basin. It has an estimated catchment basin size of 3,132 square kilometres (1,209 sq mi) and an estimated annual discharge of 9,455 million cubic meters/s. It flows westward and joins the Cagayan River in Ilagan, Isabela.

== Tributaries ==
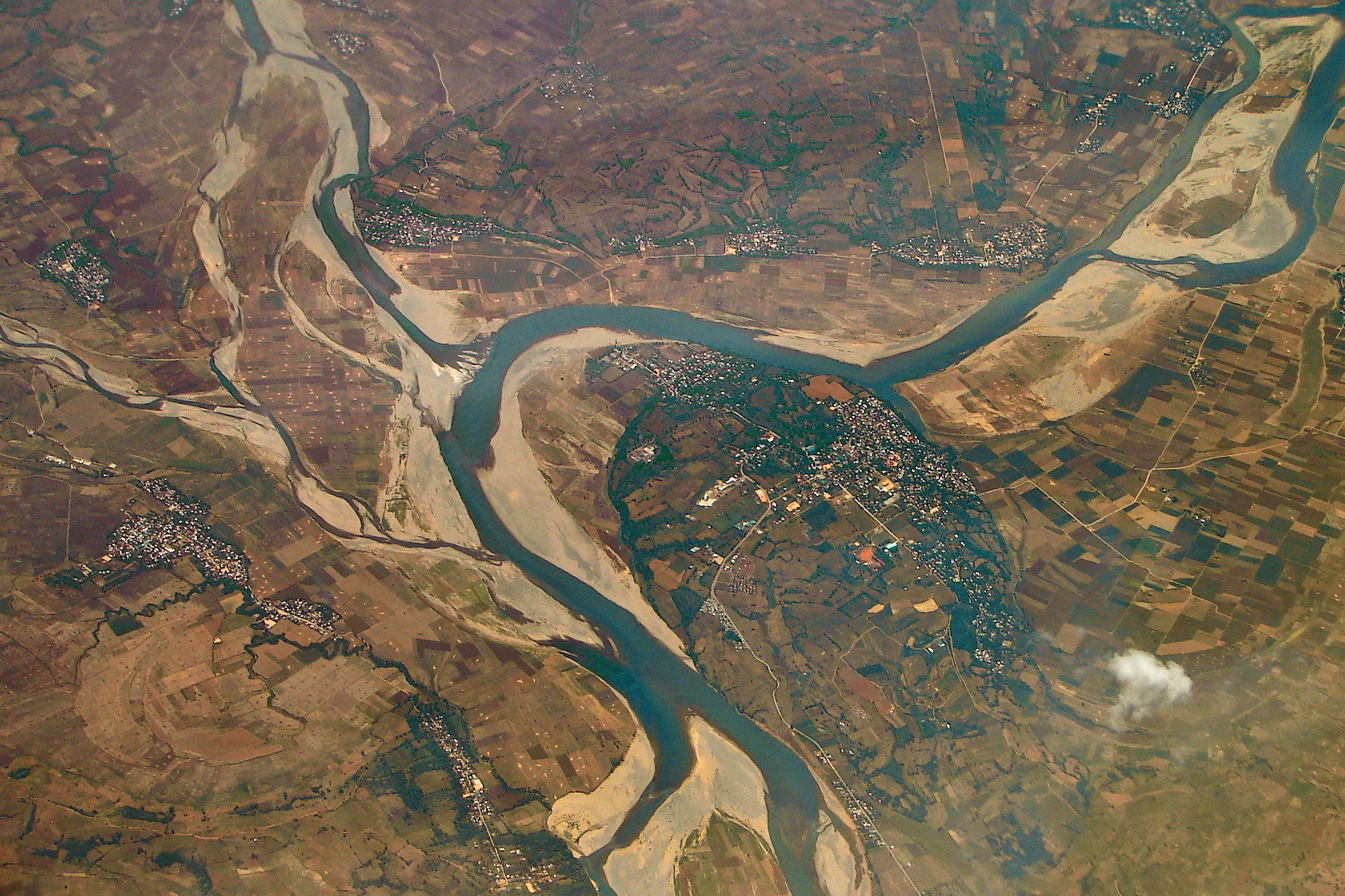
The Ilagan River at Ilagan

The major tributaries of Ilagan River are:

- Abuan River – originates from the mountains of the Northern Sierra Madre Natural Park where one of the widest tropical rainforests in Luzon can be found.
- Bintacan River
