= Northern Sierra Madre Natural Park =

Protected area in Isabela, Philippines

- IUCN category II (national park)
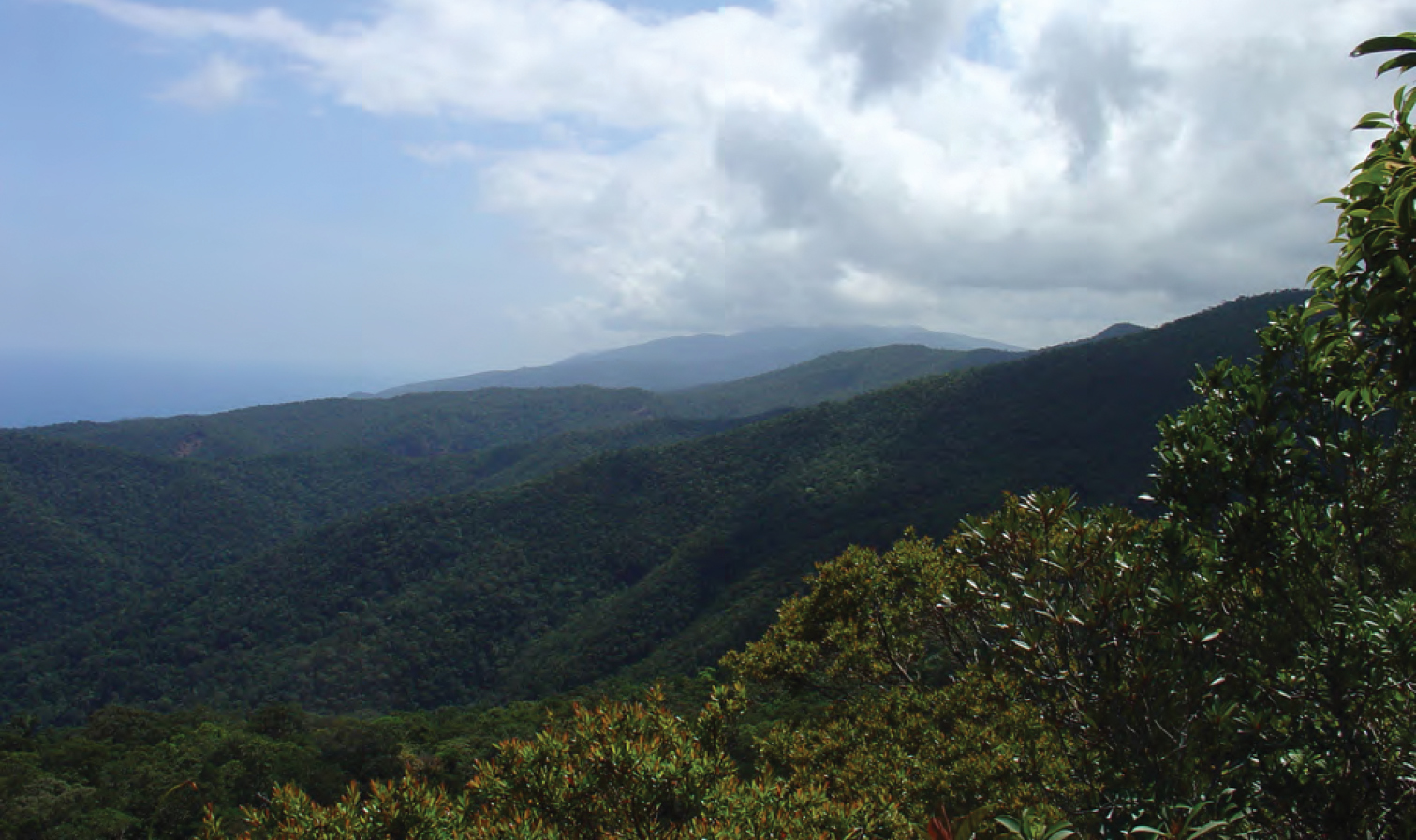
- The Northern Sierra Madre Natural Park in Diddadungan, Palanan, Isabela

- Location within Philippines
- Location: Isabela, Philippines
- Nearest city: Ilagan
- Coordinates: 17°18′29″N 122°5′10″E
- Area: 359,486 hectares (888,310 acres)
- Established: September 7, 1979 (Wilderness area); March 10, 1997 (Natural park)
- Governing body: Department of Environment and Natural Resources

The Northern Sierra Madre Natural Park is the largest protected area of the Philippines covering the northern range of the Sierra Madre mountains of eastern Luzon. The park is located in the eastern part of the province of Isabela in Cagayan Valley (Region II) containing a total of 359,486 hectares (888,310 acres). It was first declared a wilderness reserve encompassing an area within a 45 kilometres (28 mi) radius of Palanan Point known as the Palanan Wilderness Area through Letter of Instructions No. 917-A signed by President Ferdinand Marcos on September 7, 1979. On March 10, 1997, the area was converted into a natural park with the signing of Proclamation No. 978 by President Fidel Ramos.

The park is considered the richest in terms of genetic, species and habitat diversity in the Philippines. It is one of the country's ten priority protected areas managed by its own Protected Area Management Board headed by the Regional Executive Director of the Department of Environment and Natural Resources for Region II under the rules set forth in Article III of Republic Act 9125, also known as the Northern Sierra Madre Natural Park (NSMNP) Act of 2001. In 2006, the protected area was added to the Philippines' tentative list of potential UNESCO World Heritage Sites.

== Geography ==
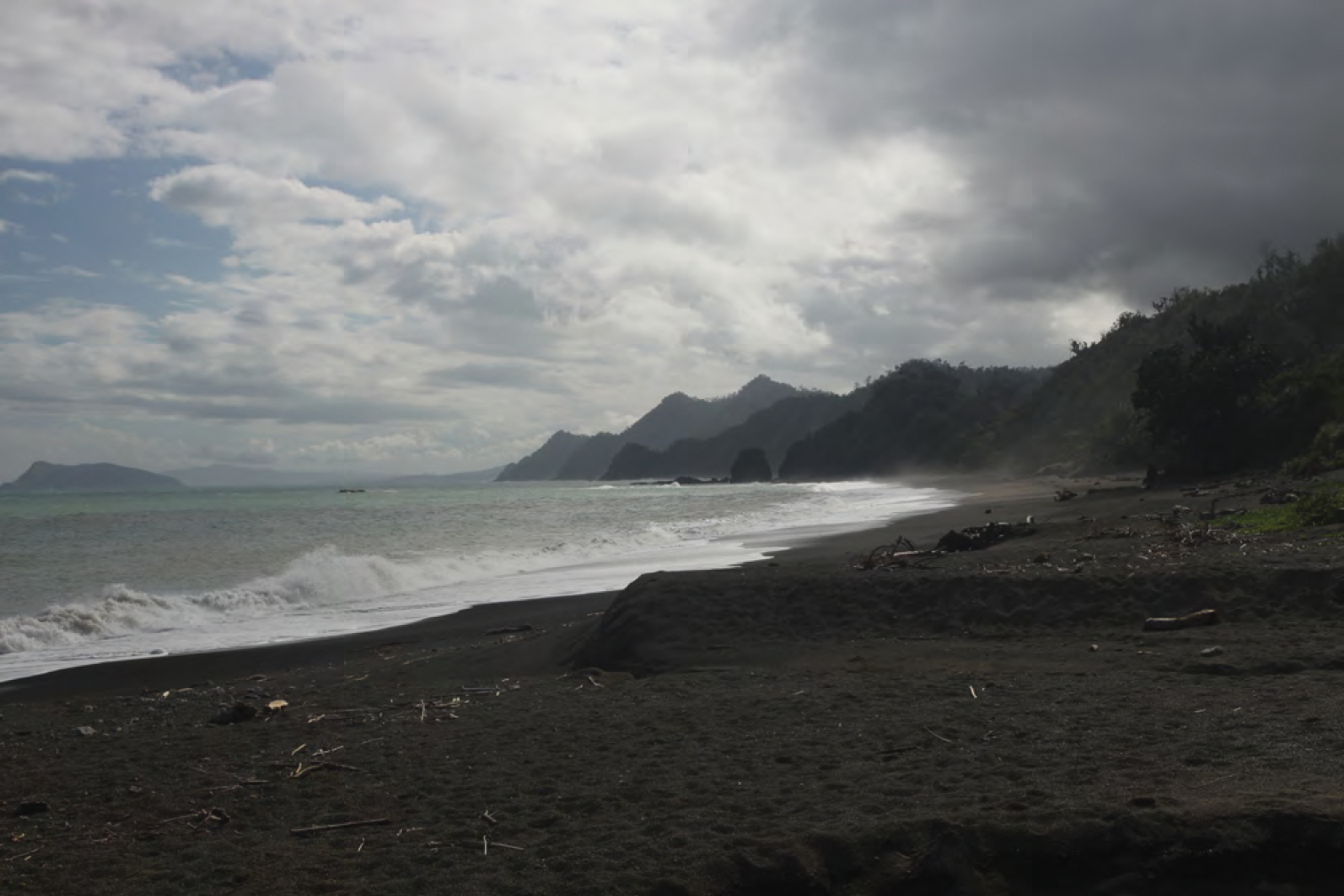
The Pacific coast of Dinapigue in the Northern Sierra Madre Natural Park

The Northern Sierra Madre Natural Park lies in the midsection of the Sierra Madre mountain range which stretches from the province of Aurora to Cagayan. It consists of 287,861 hectares (711,320 acres) of land area and 71,652 hectares (177,060 acres) of coastline water area corresponding geographically with the Isabela municipalities of Palanan, Divilacan and Maconacon, as well as portions of San Mariano, Dinapigue, San Pablo, Cabagan, Tumauini and the city of Ilagan. It is bounded on the north by the Dikatayan River, on the south by the Disabungan River, on the west by Cagayan Valley, and on the east by the Philippine Sea.

The park is characterized by high mountains with very steep slopes in the central portion of the range and relatively low hills with dominantly moderate steep slopes towards the coast. Mount Cresta on Sierra Madre's western flank is the highest peak in the park with an elevation of 1,672 metres (5,486 ft). The second highest is Mount Divilacan with an elevation of 1,311 metres (4,301 ft) located on its eastern flank.

Northern Sierra Madre is drained by 14 major river systems, 11 of which empty into the Philippine Sea and 3 flow into the Rio Grande de Cagayan as tributaries of the Ilagan River. Palanan River, with a drainage area of 63,571 hectares (157,090 acres) or 29% of the park's total area, is the most extensive, followed by Abuan River and Catalangan River.

== Biodiversity ==
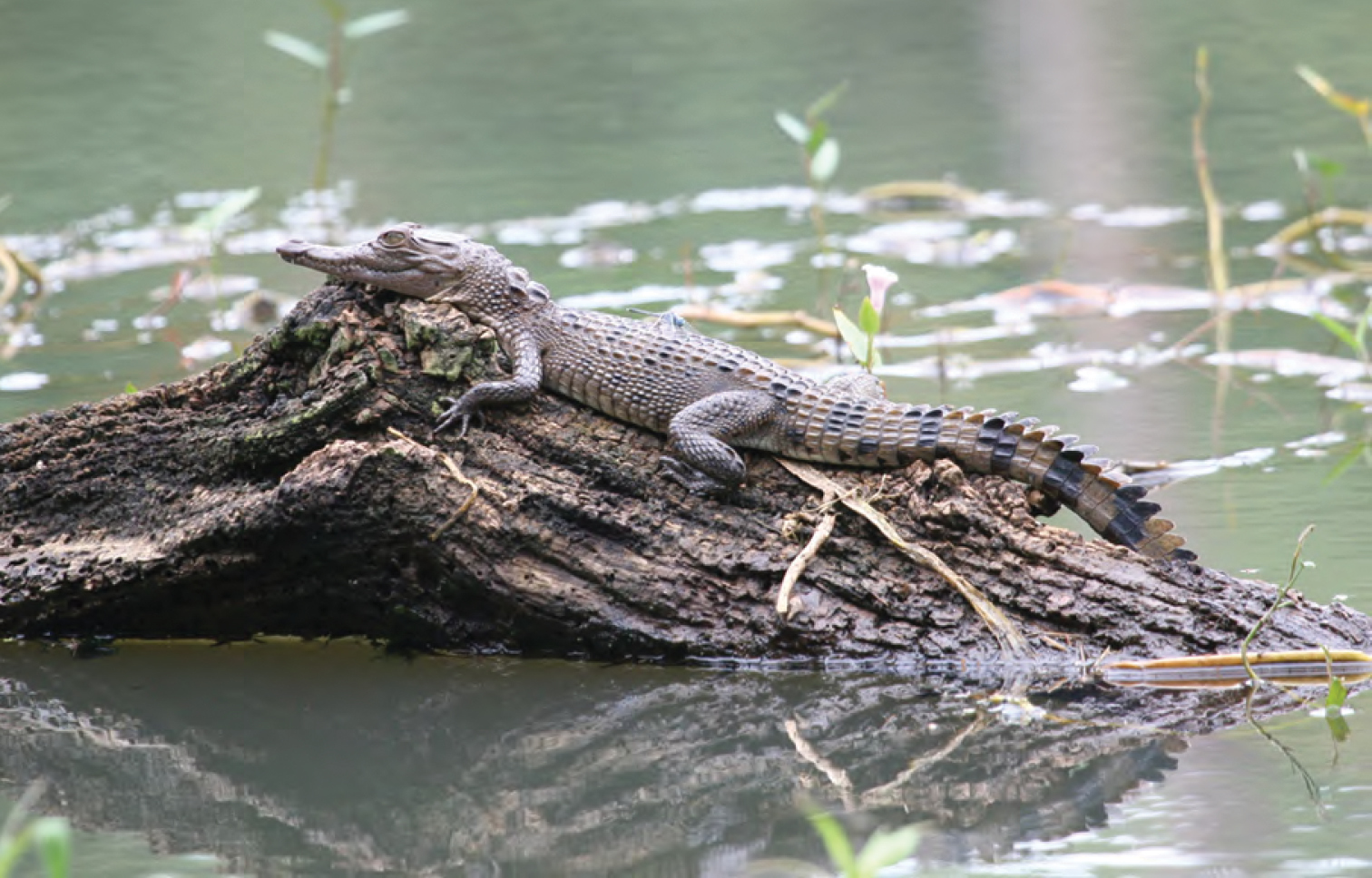
A Philippine crocodile basking on a log in the Dunoy Lake, San Mariano

The Northern Sierra Madre Natural Park is within the Sierra Madre Biogeographic Zone which lies along the eastern side of Central Luzon. It is considered one of the most important protected areas in the Philippines, owing to the myriad of rare and endangered species of flora and fauna that it supports. They include the Philippine eagle, giant golden-crowned flying fox, Philippine eagle-owl, Isabela oriole, green sea turtle, loggerhead sea turtle, hawksbill sea turtle, Philippine crocodile and dugong. It is also home to the green-faced parrotfinch and the Northern Sierra Madre forest monitor.

The park is also a habitat to many endemic species of plants. It spans two ecoregions. The Luzon rain forests extend from sea level up to 1000 meters elevation, and are characterized by various species of tall, straight and slender trees of the family Dipterocarpaceae such as Shorea spp. and Hopea spp.. The Luzon montane rain forests include areas above 1000 meters elevation, and the predominant trees are oaks and laurels. The park is home to various orchids such as Dendrobium aclinia, the leguminous plant millettia, and species of citrus (Aurantioideae).

Woodlands cover the largest portion of the park followed by agricultural lands and grasslands. In the coastal municipalities of Palanan and Maconacon where agricultural lands are mostly found, the most common crops are palay, coconut, corn, peanuts, pineapple and other vegetable crops. Grasslands and shrublands are found mainly in the park's southwestern portion where cogon grass and talahib grow.

== Indigenous communities ==
The park is home to Indigenous Dumagat and Agta communities.

== See also ==
- Fuyot Springs National Park
