= Magapit Suspension Bridge =

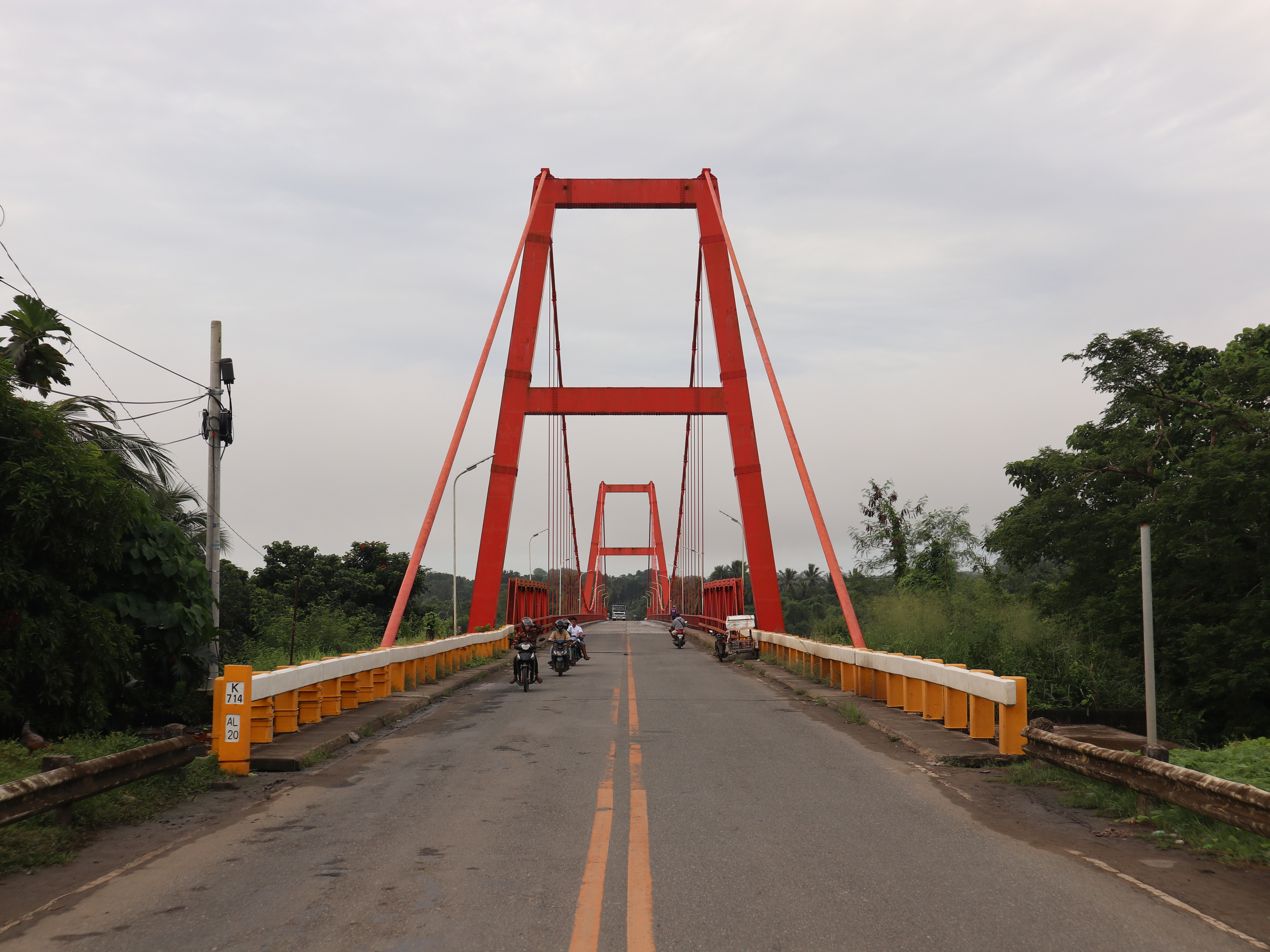
- The bridge in 2022
- Coordinates: 18.122258°N 121.672672°E
- Carries: 2 lanes of AH 26 (N1), vehicular traffic and pedestrian sidewalks
- Crosses: Cagayan River
- Locale: Lal-lo, Cagayan
- Official name: Magapit Suspension Bridge
- Other name(s): Magapit Bridge
- Maintained by: Department of Public Works and Highways

Characteristics
- Design: Suspension bridge
- Material: Steel
- Total length: 449.14 m (1,473.6 ft)
- Width: 20.44 m (67.1 ft)
- Longest span: 257 m (843 ft)
- Load limit: 20 t (20,000 kg)
- No. of lanes: Two-lane single carriageway

History
- Opened: 1978

The Magapit Bridge is suspension bridge spanning 257 meters (843 ft) that connects the east and west sides of the Cagayan River in Lal-lo, Cagayan, Philippines. Opened in 1978, it carries Maharlika Highway, linking Barangays Bangag and Magapit in Lal-lo. The bridge was also named by the locals as the "Golden Gate of Cagayan". This bridge is one of the only two bridges in the province that runs across the Cagayan River.

== Rehabilitation ==
The bridge underwent rehabilitation from May 16, 2012 to November 20, 2012. Traffic in that area was serviced by ferry boats in lieu of the rehabilitation. The rehabilitation project had an estimated cost of ₱100 million.
