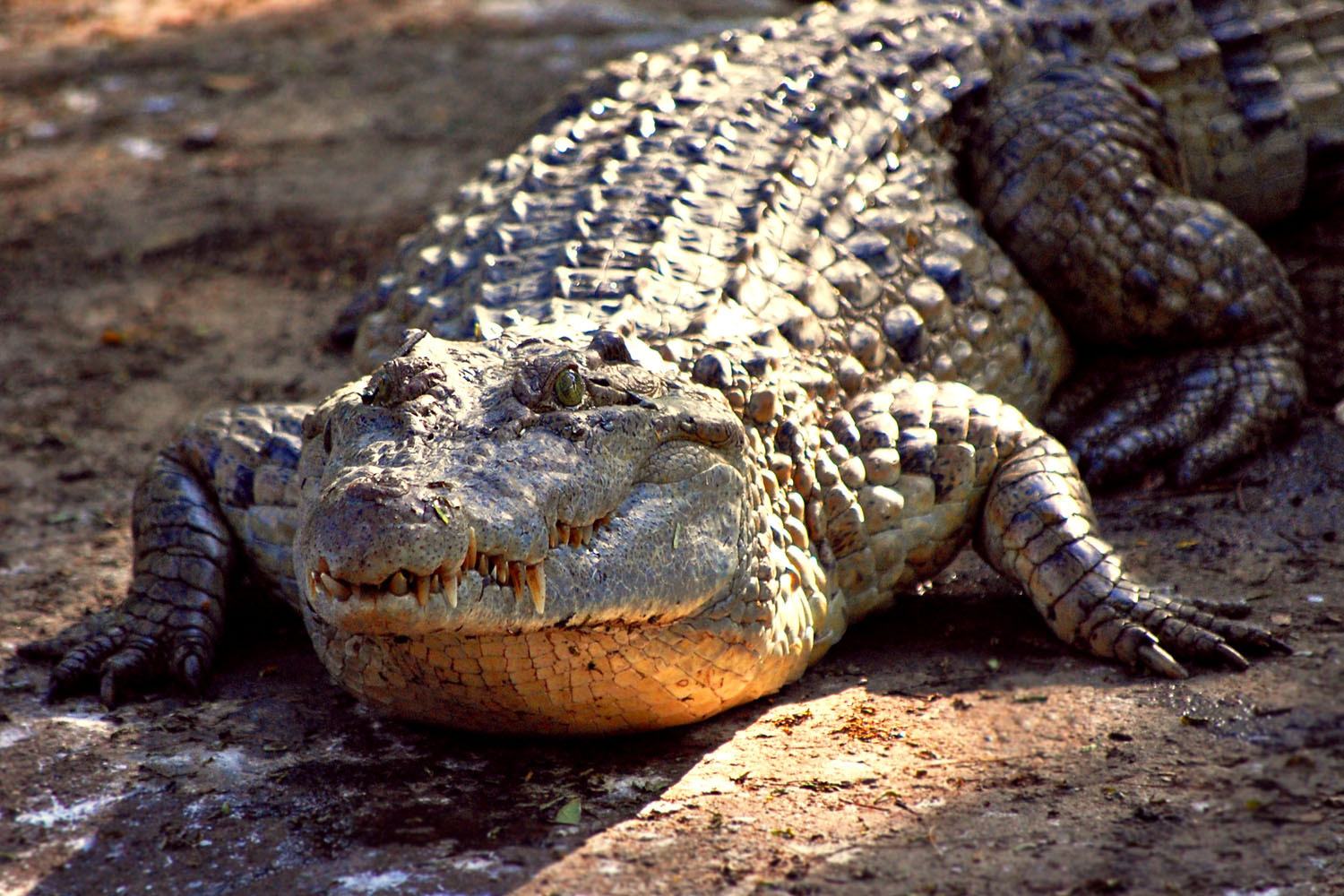
- An adult basking on the island of Palawan, Philippines

Conservation status
- Critically Endangered (IUCN 3.1)
- CITES Appendix I

Scientific classification
- Kingdom: Animalia
- Phylum: Chordata
- Class: Reptilia
- Order: Crocodylia
- Family: Crocodylidae
- Genus: Crocodylus
- Species: C. mindorensis

Binomial name
- Crocodylus mindorensis Schmidt, 1935
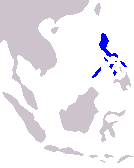
- Range of the Philippine crocodile in blue

= Philippine crocodile =

Philippine crocodile Temporal range: Late Pleistocene–Present, 0.1–0 Ma

Species of crocodile

The Philippine crocodile (Crocodylus mindorensis), also known as the Mindoro crocodile, the Philippine freshwater crocodile, the bukarot in Ilocano, and more generally as a buwaya in most Filipino lowland cultures, is endemic to the Philippines. It has been listed as critically endangered since 2008 due to exploitation and unsustainable fishing methods, such as dynamite fishing. Conservation methods are being taken by the Dutch/Filipino Mabuwaya foundation, the Crocodile Conservation Society and the Zoological Institute of HerpaWorld in Mindoro island. It is strictly prohibited to kill a crocodile in the country, and it is punishable by law.

== Taxonomy ==
Until 1989, it was considered a subspecies of the New Guinea crocodile (Crocodylus novaeguineae). They are now recognized as closely related but separate species.

=== Evolution ===
The genus Crocodylus likely originated in Africa and radiated outwards towards Southeast Asia and the Americas, although an Australia/Asia origin has also been considered. Phylogenetic evidence supports Crocodylus diverging from its closest recent relative, the extinct Voay of Madagascar, around 25 million years ago, near the Oligocene/Miocene boundary.

=== Phylogeny ===
Below is a cladogram based on a 2018 tip dating study by Lee & Yates simultaneously using morphological, molecular (DNA sequencing), and stratigraphic (fossil age) data, as revised by the 2021 Hekkala et al. paleogenomics study using DNA extracted from the extinct Voay. Hall's New Guinea crocodile placement suggested in 2023 study by Sales-Oliveira et al.

- Crocodylus
  - - - - - - Crocodylus johnstoni Freshwater crocodile
      - - - - Crocodylus novaeguineae New Guinea crocodile
          - - Crocodylus halli Hall's New Guinea crocodile
        - - - Crocodylus mindorensis Philippine crocodile
    - - - - - Crocodylus porosus Saltwater crocodile
      - - - - Crocodylus siamensis Siamese crocodile
        - - - Crocodylus palustris Mugger crocodile
  - - - - - - Crocodylus suchus West African crocodile
    - - - - - Crocodylus niloticus Nile crocodile
      - - - - Crocodylus rhombifer Cuban crocodile
        - - - Crocodylus intermedius Orinoco crocodile
            - Crocodylus acutus American crocodile
          - - Crocodylus moreletii Morelet's crocodile

== Characteristics ==
The Philippine crocodile is a crocodilian endemic to the Philippines. It is a relatively small, freshwater crocodile. It has a relatively broad snout and thick bony plates on its back (heavy dorsal armor). This is a fairly small species, reaching breeding maturity at 1.5 m (4 ft 11 in) and 15 kg (33 lb) in both sexes. A 69-kilogram (152 lb) individual was found to have a bite force of 2,736 N (615 lb_{f}). Adults rarely exceed 2.7 m (8 ft 10 in) and 90 kg (200 lb), and only the largest males attain record maximum size of up to 3.5 m (11 ft), perhaps reaching the maximum weight of 210 kg (460 lb) in exceptional individuals. Females are slightly smaller than males. Philippine crocodiles are golden-brown in color, which darkens as they mature.

== Distribution and habitat ==
The Philippine crocodile has been extirpated in Samar, Jolo, Negros, Masbate, and Busuanga. Populations still survive in the Northern Sierra Madre Natural Park within the Luzon rainforest, San Mariano, Isabela, Dalupiri Island in the Babuyan Islands, Abra in Luzon and the Ligawasan Marsh, Lake Sebu in South Cotabato, Pulangi River in Bukidnon, Paghungawan Marsh in Siargao Island, and possibly in the Agusan Marsh Wildlife Sanctuary in Mindanao. The Philippine crocodile wildlife populations that reside in these locations live geographically isolated from each other, which ultimately impacts their population level differentiation and decreases genetic diversity. It was historically found in parts of Visayas and until the numbers were drastically cut by, mainly, habitat destruction. These crocodiles eat ailing fish in a significantly higher proportion than healthy fish, thus improving the common health of the fish stock. By preying on the most common fish, they balance the fish population; any species which suddenly becomes dominant is put back in its proper proportion. Crocodile droppings are nutritious for the fish and contain critically important chemicals.

== Conservation status ==
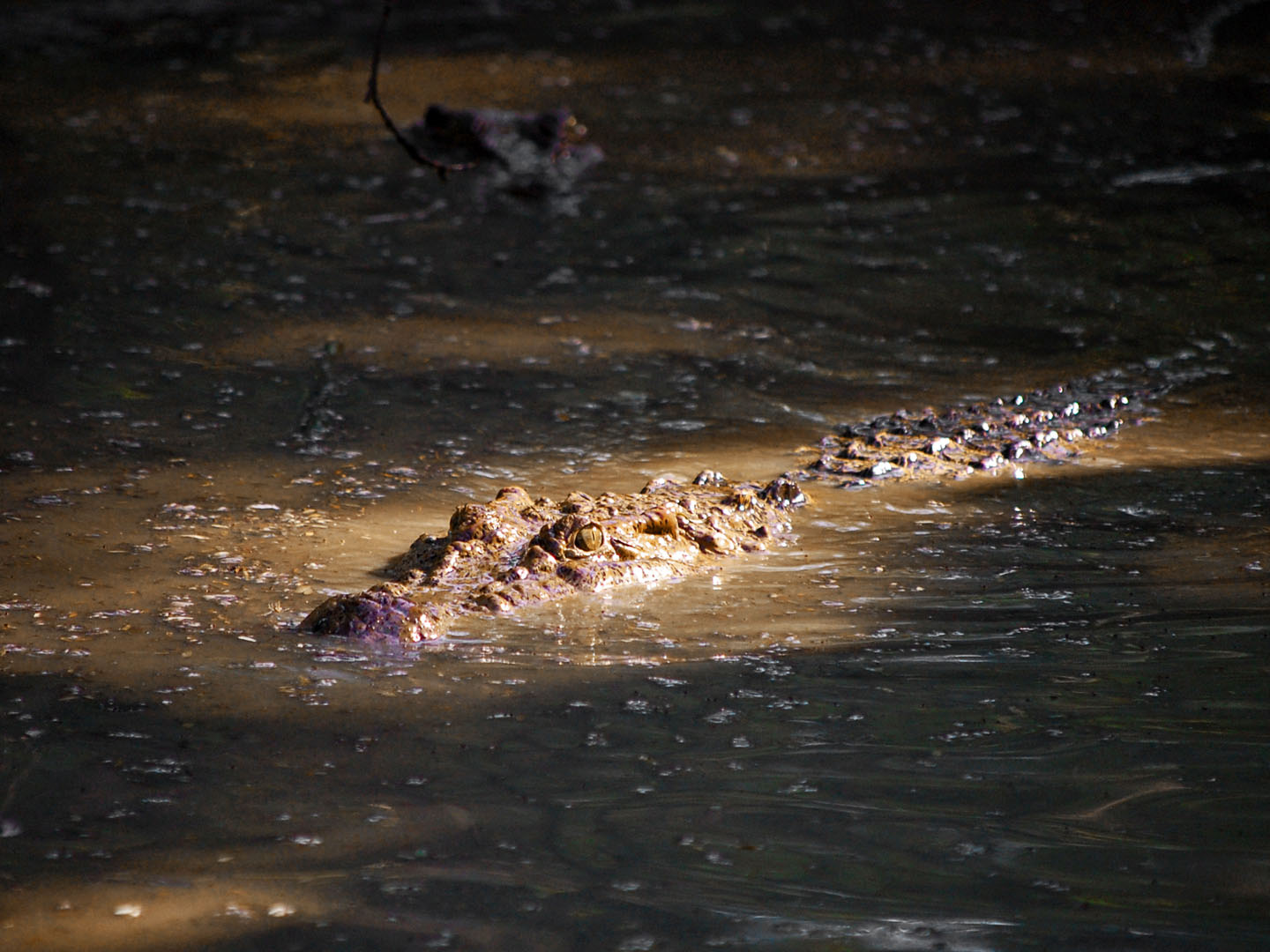
A Philippine crocodile swimming stealthily

Crocodylus mindorensis is considered to be the most severely threatened crocodile species in the world, listed as critically endangered on the IUCN Red List. A population estimate of 100 non-hatchling individuals underlines the critical status of the species. Since October 2021, C. mindorensis has been classified as Critically Depleted by the IUCN.

The killing of crocodiles seems to be the major cause of the decreasing number of this species. In northeast Luzon, a community-based conservation approach developed under the Crocodile Rehabilitation Observance and Conservation (CROC) project was adopted with the aim of reaching sustainable co-habitation of crocodiles and local people.

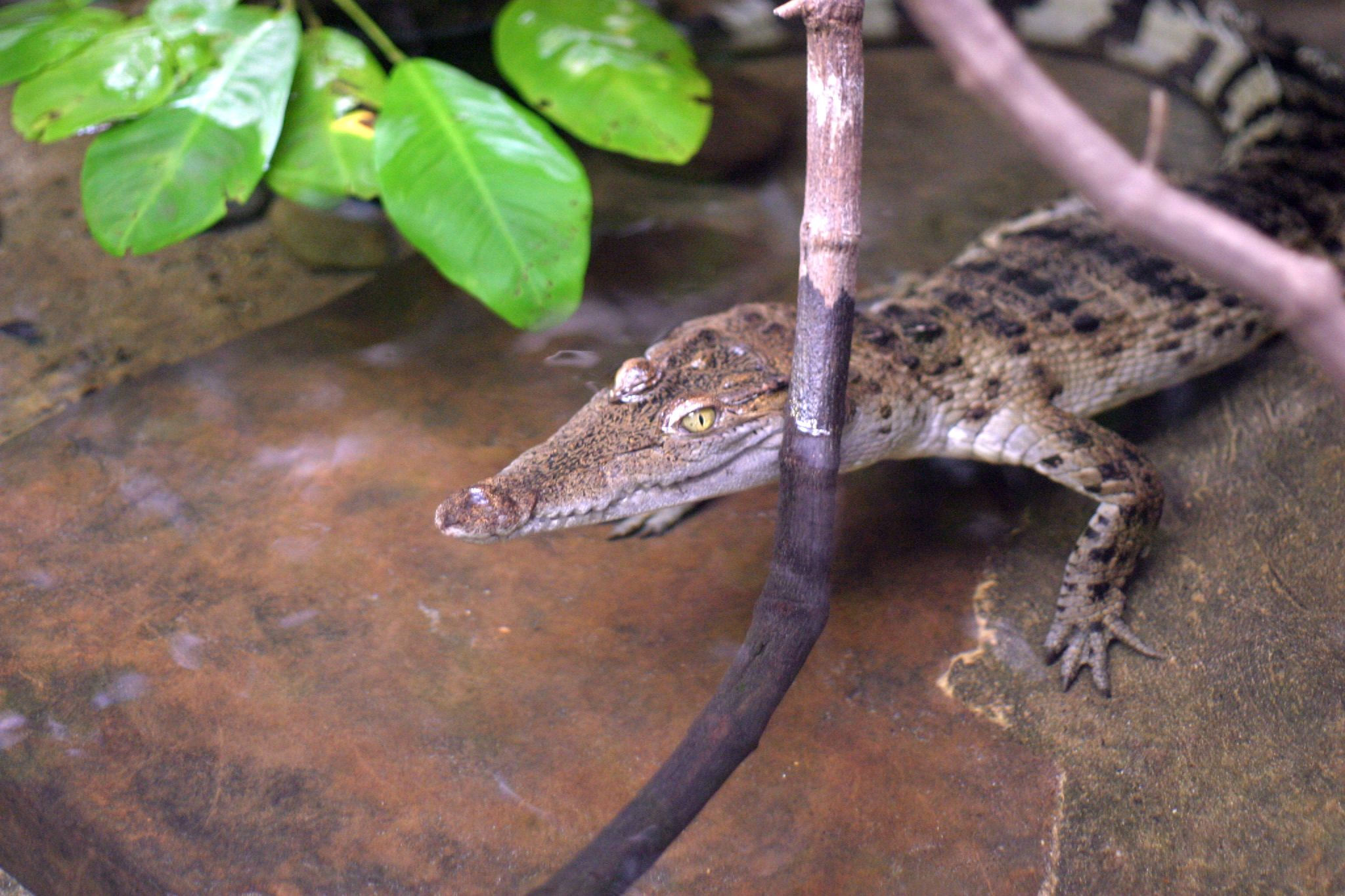
A juvenile

In 2007, a specialist group was founded by several people within the Philippines, involved in crocodilian conservation. The Crocodile Conservation Society Philippines and the Zoological Institute of HerpaWorld are working on conservation breeding and release programs. C. mindorensis was considered locally extinct in part of its former range in northern Luzon until a live specimen was caught in San Mariano, Isabela, in 1999. That individual, nicknamed "Isabela" by its captors, was given to the care of the Crocodile Rehabilitation Observance and Conservation until it was released in August 2007. The specimen was 1.6 m long at the time of its release.

The Philippine crocodile became nationally protected by law in 2001 with the enactment of Republic Act 9147 known as the Wildlife Act. It is punishable to kill a crocodile, with a maximum penalty of ₱100,000 (equivalent to about $2,500). The Philippine Senate introduced resolution no. 790 on May 31, 2012, to further strengthen and augment existing laws for the protection of the Philippine crocodile and the saltwater crocodile.

=== Media ===
This crocodile was featured in National Geographic's Dangerous Encounters hosted by crocodile specialist Dr. Brady Barr. In one of the episodes, Barr sought to be the first person to see all species of crocodiles in the world. Fortunately, he was able to see a Philippine crocodile that was about two weeks old.

The hatching of a Philippine crocodile was recorded in GMA News Born to Be Wild. They also recorded that tropical fire ants, an invasive species, eat unhatched endangered bukarot eggs. The media team saved a nest from a fire ant attack. Also recorded were adult Philippine crocodiles.

== Common names ==
Aside from the general term buwaya or buaya (which generally apply to C. porosus but can also apply to C. mindorensis in languages where the two species are not differentiated), they were known by various names throughout the islands. In Spanish colonial records, the two species were often differentiated as cocodrilo (for C. porosus) and caimán for (for C. mindorensis), but this distinction is not followed by English dictionaries and translations.

In northern Luzon, Cagayan Valley, and the Sierra Madre mountain range, they were known as bukarot or bokarot in Ilocano, Isneg, Ibanag, and Yogad; lamag in Itawis, Yogad, Dupaningan Agta, and Kalinga; and lamig in Gaddang.

In southern Luzon and the central islands of the Philippines, they were also known as tigbin in Tagalog; barangitaw in Bikol, Mangyan, and Eastern Visayas; balanghitao or balangita in Cebuano and Central Visayan languages; and also burangas or burangaris in Mangyan.

In Mindanao and Palawan, they are known as nguso in Agusan Manobo; sapding in Mandaya; balangitao or dagorogan in Maranao; bungut in Batak; and bungot in Tagbanwa.

== Mythology, folklore, and cultural significance ==
In the pre-colonial anito beliefs throughout the Philippine islands, crocodiles (both C. mindorensis and C. porosus) were feared and revered, which played a key role in their survival up until modern times. The Spaniards recorded that rivers and lakes were filled with crocodiles, and people often lived and fished close to them, which alarmed most European observers. Some communities put up small bamboo fences to keep crocodiles out from certain areas and people avoided provoking them, but in general, they did not take many specific precautions against them. There was an unspoken "peace pact" between crocodiles and people. There were very strict taboos against killing crocodiles or eating crocodile meat, though crocodiles which attack or kill a person are always killed by the community.

It was widely believed that crocodiles never attacked people arbitrarily. Thus attacks by crocodiles were regarded with fatalistic attitudes, as being the fault of the victim for transgressing taboos, or as punishment by the spirits for breaking an oath. The Spanish conquistador Miguel López de Legazpi records in 1571 that his treaties with Sulayman, Ache, and Lakandula of Manila and Tondo were sworn on the condition that they would die and be eaten by crocodiles if they break the agreements. Regardless, being eaten by a crocodile was regarded as an honorable death, as it ensured that the soul of the person would be safely transported to the spirit world by the crocodile via the rainbow.

Crocodiles regarded with superstition can be generally divided into three kinds: crocodiles which are reincarnations of ancestors (anito), embodiments of powerful nature spirits (diwata), or shapeshifted malevolent spirits or witches (aswang). Not all crocodiles are seen as personifications of these three, but crocodiles with extraordinary traits, like being very large, being uncharacteristically docile, having strange coloration, being crippled or having visible birth defects, are often regarded as such. In several creation myths of the islands, the creator deity is a crocodile, and crocodiles were often seen as guardians of the spirit world (where the dead go) and psychopomps who lead the spirits of the dead safely. Crocodiles were also believed to also exist in a sort of parallel spirit world, often interpreted as an underwater village. Several ethnic groups also consider crocodiles to be their direct ancestors, and datu and warriors often traced their lineage to crocodiles. Crocodiles were also often addressed with kinship titles like nono ("grandfather").

Depictions of crocodiles were commonly carved into coffins or woven into funeral clothes to protect the spirit of the deceased. Crocodile teeth were also commonly worn as agimat (amulets) for protection against disease and evil spirits.

In modern Filipino culture, crocodiles are perceived negatively. They are regarded as vermin and a threat to small children and livestock. They are also associated with greed, deceit, corruption, and nepotism. The term buwaya is frequently used as an insult for corrupt politicians and government officials, moneylenders, and the police.
