= Callao Cave =

Cave and archaeological site in the Philippines

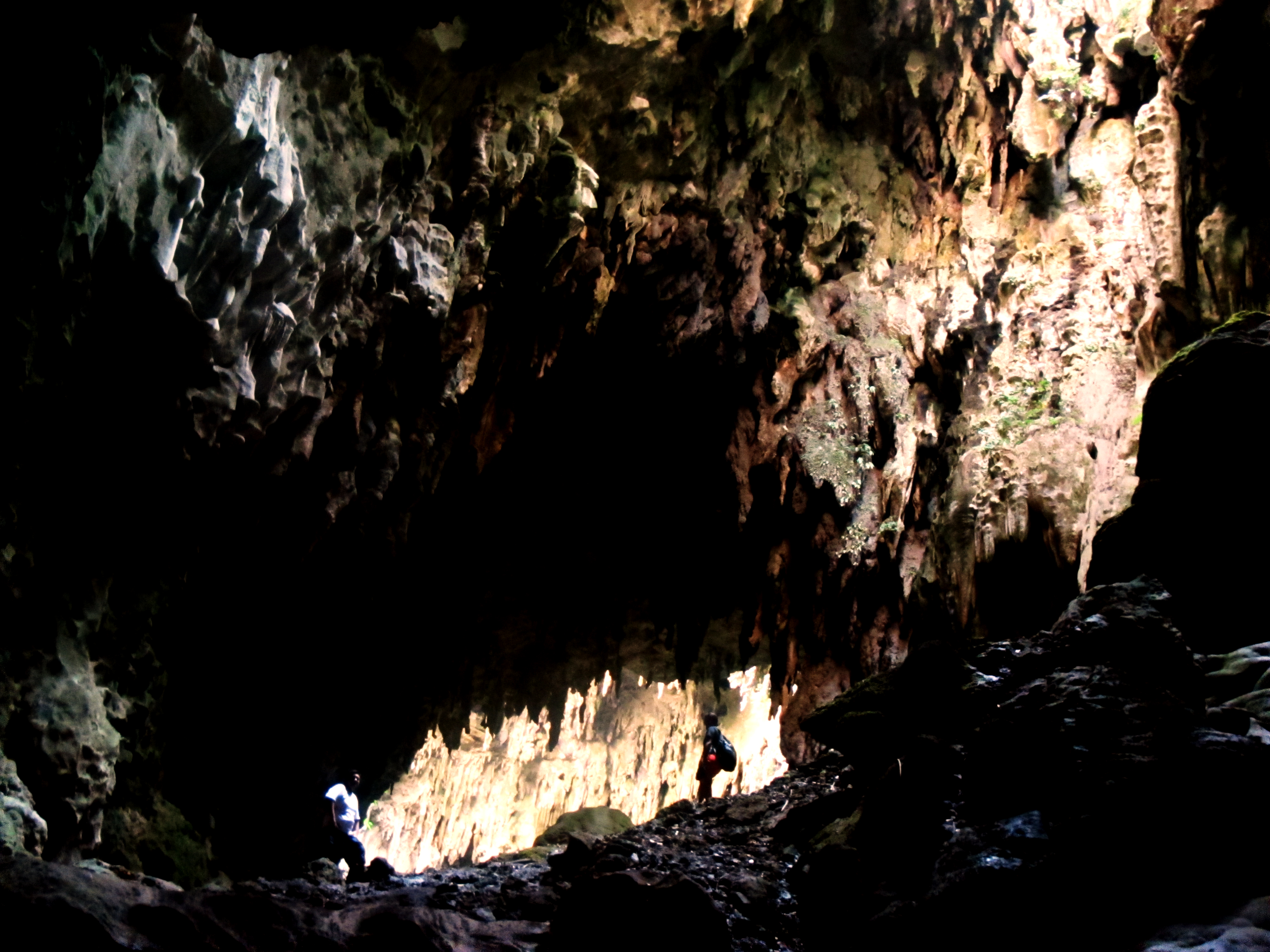
- Callao Cave's fifth chamber

- Location within Philippines
- Location: Peñablanca, Cagayan; Philippines
- Coordinates: 17°42′11.74″N 121°49′25.5″E
- Geology: Limestone formation
- Entrances: One
- Difficulty: Easy
- Hazards: Wet cave floor
- Access: Public
- Show cave opened: Callao Cave's seven chambers
- Lighting: Natural roof crevice
- Features: Church built inside the first chamber

Callao Cave (IPA: [ˈkalaʊ]) is one of 300 limestone caves located in the Barangays of Magdalo and Quibal in the municipality of Peñablanca, about 24 km (15 mi) northeast of Tuguegarao City, the capital of Cagayan province within the Peñablanca Protected Landscape and Seascape in the western foothills of the Northern Sierra Madre Mountains on Luzon island in the Philippines. The town Peñablanca's (Spanish: white rocks) name refers to the predominance of white limestone rock formations in the area. First excavated in 1980 by Maharlika Cuevas, the seven-chamber show cave is the best known natural tourist attraction of the Cagayan province and in February 2020 has officially been recognized as an important cultural property of the Philippines.

These fossils of archaic humans, that lived during the Late Pleistocene were first discovered in the cave and documented in 2007 by a team led by Armand Salvador Mijares from the University of the Philippines Diliman and eventually confirmed in 2019 to belong to a previously unknown and now extinct human sub-species - Callao Man or Homo luzonensis.

== Protection status ==
Callao Cave was visited by American Governor-General Theodore Roosevelt Jr. in 1932 who, during his term, created the National Park system of the country with the passing of Act No. 3195 in 1932. Callao Cave was one of the earliest national parks in the country when it was established on July 16, 1935, by Proclamation no. 827. The Callao Cave National Park encompasses an area of 192 hectares (470 acres) of land. With the passing of the NIPAS Act of 1992 that revamped the protected areas of the country, the Callao National Park was reclassified but enlarged by Proclamation no. 416 on June 29, 1994. The protected area was reestablished as the Peñablanca Protected Landscape.

In 2003 upon the recommendation of the Department of Environment and Natural Resources (DENR), the protected area was further enlarged to include certain parcels of land in the public domain. Proclamation 416 no. was amended by Proclamation no. 484, signed by President Arroyo on October 6, 2003. The law enlarged the park to 118,781.58 hectares (293,515.7 acres) and renamed it the Peñablanca Protected Landscape and Seascape (PPLS).

The protected area is particularly described as bounded on the North and East of Public Forest under FR-1011 per Proclamation No. 584 dated July 8, 1940; on the South by Callao Reforestation Project and on the West by Block I, Alienable and Disposable of Cagayan Project No. 13-C, Certified on February 27, 1923.

== Features ==
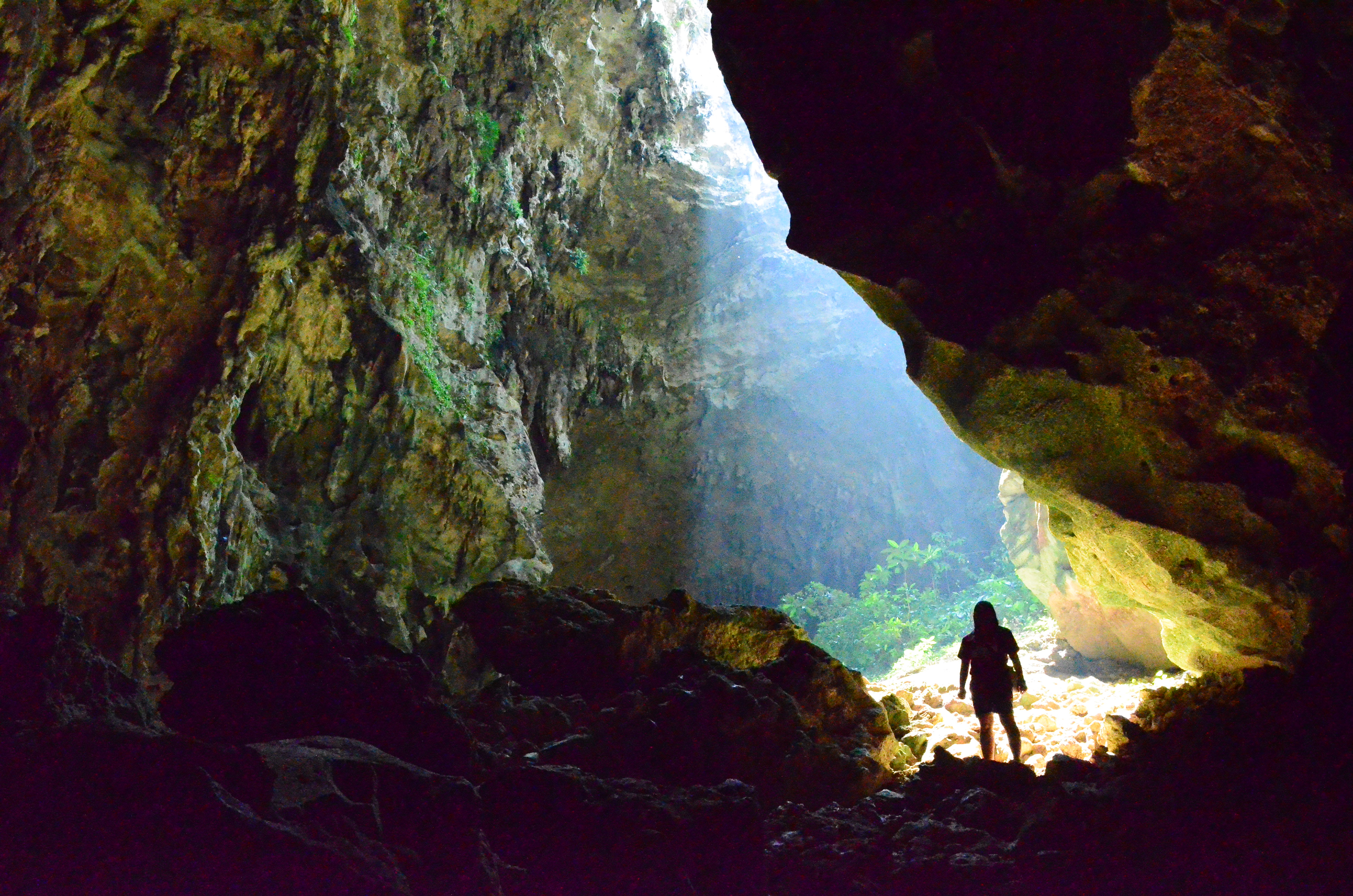
Callao Cave

More than 300 caves dot the protected area, 75 of which have been documented by the National Museum since 1977. The Callao Cave and the nearby, but more challenging, Sierra Cave are easily accessible by automobile.

The Callao Cave is the premier attraction in the Peñablanca Protected Landscape and Seascape. It is the most accessible of all the caves, its entrance is reached by climbing 184 concrete steps. The Callao Cave system is composed of seven chambers, each with natural crevices above that let streams of light into the cave, serving as illumination for the otherwise dark areas of the place. Previously, there were reported to be nine caves in the system, but an earthquake in the 1980s cut off the last two chambers.

The first chamber of the show cave is the largest room with a width of about 50 m (160 ft) and a height of 36 m (118 ft). The cathedral-like room has been turned into a chapel by the local people. A rock formation serves as the altar of the chapel lit by a stream of light coming from a rooftop opening. The conditions inside the caves have caused the formation of stalactites and stalagmites, more so in the deeper chambers. Several spectacular speleothems or formations are found inside the cave like flowstones, glittering dripstones, cave curtains, crystal helictites, columns, etc.

=== Stratification ===
The analysis of the sediments and depositions in the cave confirm human occupation of the cave as early as 67,000 years B.P. However, the next human habitation strata, that contains cultural depositions (charcoal, hearths and chert flake tools) and dates to ca. 25,000 years B.P. only lies on top of a 2 m (6.6 ft) thick almost completely sterile layer. The most recent occupation horizon, on top of a layer of volcanic depositions dates to the Neolithic (around 3,600 years B.P.) and contained ceramic shards, stone tool fragments, faunal remains and human burials. The results demonstrate, that the Callao cave was only intermittently occupied during the last 70,000 years.

== Classification ==
Callao Cave is classified by the Department of Environment and Natural Resources as a Class II cave. This describes caves with areas that have hazardous conditions and contain sensitive geological, archaeological, cultural, historical, and biological values or high quality ecosystems. Such caves are open to experienced spelunkers or caving enthusiasts and guided visits, although some portions may be closed seasonally or permanently for conservation purposes.

The Bat Cave near Callao Cave is a Class III cave meaning they are 'generally safe' for inexperienced visitors. They have no known threatened species within, nor any archaeological, geological, historical, or cultural values. Economic activities, such as collection of guano and edible bird's nest, are allowed in such caves.

=== Homo luzonensis ===
Homo luzonensis refers to human fossils first discovered inside Callao Cave in 2007 by a team made up of Filipino, French and Australian archeologists led by Armand Salvador Mijares. Although tentatively considered by the scientific community as the remains of Homo sapiens, the find, which consisted of a single 61 mm (2.4 in) metatarsal (foot bone) was dubbed Callao Man. When dated using uranium series ablation, it was found to be at least 67,000 years old. This significantly antedates the 47,000-year-old remains of the Palawan Tabon Man and represents the earliest human fossil yet found in the Philippines and it also ranks among the oldest traces of human presence in Southeast Asia and the entire Asia-Pacific region. In 2010, more fossils were unearthed and after Armand Salvador Mijares and his team discovered further material in 2015 (seven teeth and six small bones) a thorough anthropological and genetic study was undertaken. On April 10, 2019, the team of paleoanthropologists Florent Détroit and Armand Salvador Mijares published the conclusions in the journal Nature, announcing the taxon of this newly identified human species to be Homo luzonensis, which definitely lived on Luzon island between 50,000 and 67,000 years ago.

As the discovery adds a new chapter to the complex history of human evolution, Armand Mijares remarked, that it puts the Philippines...which always had been peripheral in this debate...in the spotlight of human evolution.

Anthropological studies suggested, that Callao Man, like Homo floresiensis from Indonesia was less than four feet tall. Researchers have also noted, that the indigenous Aeta people, who live in the mountains of Luzon Island, might be descendants of Callao Man.

== Other caves ==
A rock art of a human-like figure is found in Hermoso Tuliao Cave. The rock art, about 3,500 years old, shows a human-like figure with arms up and legs spread open. It is believed to have been created by either early Austronesians or the Agta Negritos who migrated during the Ice Age.

Other pristine and undisturbed caves with living rock formations in the Peñablanca Protected Landscape and Seascape include Jackpot, Laurente, Odessa-Tumbali, Quibal, Roc, San Carlos, and Sierra Caves, among others. These caves may be explored with guides from Sierra Madre Outdoor Club, Adventures and Expedition Philippines Inc., and North Adventurer. Daily circadian flight of bats from the Bat Cave occurs at dusk.
