= Malay civet cat =

Malay civet cat is the common name of two species of Viverrid.

- Malayan civet (Viverra tangalunga)
- Binturong (Arctictis binturong)
