= Peñablanca =

Municipality in Cagayan, Philippines

- Municipality
- Municipality of Peñablanca
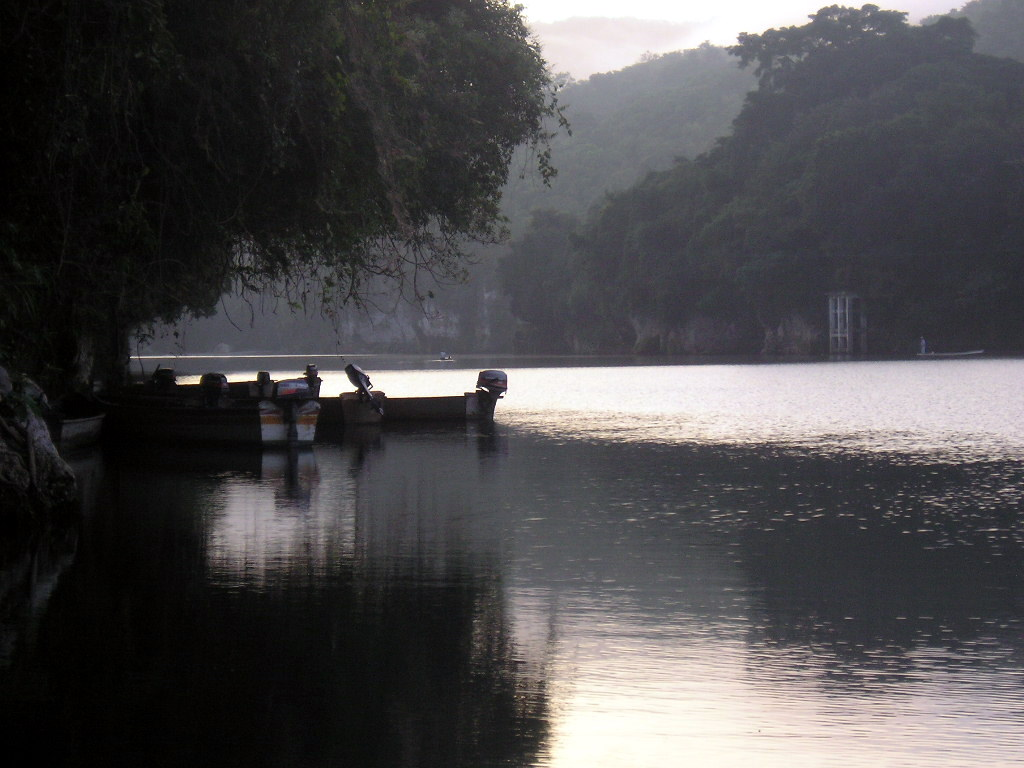
- Pinacanauan River

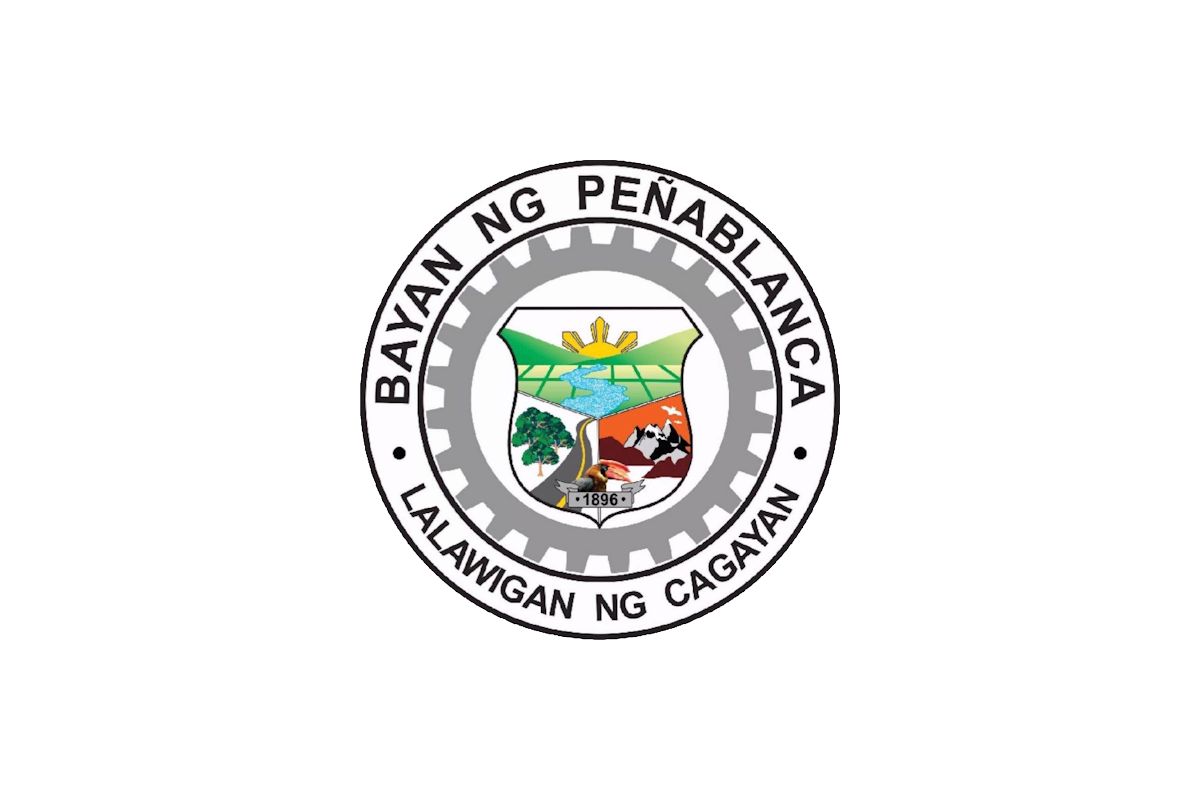
- Flag

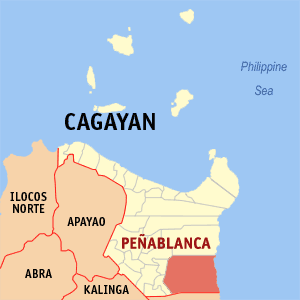
- Map of Cagayan with Peñablanca highlighted
- Interactive map of Peñablanca
- Location within the Philippines
- Coordinates: 17°37′33″N 121°47′07″E
- Country: Philippines
- Region: Cagayan Valley
- Province: Cagayan
- District: 3rd district
- Barangays: 24 (see Barangays)

Government
  - Type: Sangguniang Bayan
  - Mayor: Marilyn J.Taguinod
  - Vice Mayor: Washington M. Taguinod
  - Representative: Joseph L. Lara
  - Electorate: 30,770 voters (2025)

Area
  - Total: 1,193.20 km^{2} (460.70 sq mi)
- Elevation: 58 m (190 ft)
- Highest elevation: 301 m (988 ft)
- Lowest elevation: 14 m (46 ft)

Population (2024 census)
  - Total: 50,856
  - Density: 42.622/km^{2} (110.39/sq mi)
  - Households: 11,595

Economy
  - Income class: 1st municipal income class
  - Poverty incidence: 9.39% (2023)
  - Revenue: ₱ 483.7 million (2024)
  - Assets: ₱ 836.5 million (2024)
  - Expenditure: ₱ 423 million (2024)
  - Liabilities: ₱ 34.06 million (2024)

Service provider
  - Electricity: Cagayan 1 Electric Cooperative (CAGELCO 1)
- Time zone: UTC+8 (PST)
- ZIP code: 3502
- PSGC: 0201519000
- IDD : area code: +63 (0)78
- Native languages: Ibanag; Ilocano; Itawis; Atta; Tagalog
- Website: www.penablanca-cagayan.gov.ph

Peñablanca, officially the Municipality of Peñablanca (Ibanag: Ili nat Peñablanca; Ilocano: Ili ti Peñablanca; Tagalog: Bayan ng Peñablanca), is a municipality in the province of Cagayan, Philippines. According to the 2024 census, it has a population of 50,856 people.

Peñablanca is home to the charcoal-drawn Peñablanca petrographs and the Callao Limeston Formation. Both the Peñablanca Petrographs and the Callao Limestone Formation are included as tentative sites of the Philippines for future inclusion in the UNESCO World Heritage List. The Callao Limestone Formation has at least 93 archaeological sites that yielded stone tools of Paleolithic industry and bones and shells of animals still living in the vicinity.

== History ==
Named after its prominent white rock formations, Peñablanca was formerly a barrio of Tuguegarao named Bubug. However, it also went by other names such as Alimannao, which was said to have been derived from a German rancher named Otto Weber, who, when one of his servants was asked who owned the cows in the area, responded in Itawis: cua na Aliman yao (they belong to the German). Another name for the place was camasi, from the native word for tomato, which abounded in the area. Both Alimannao and Camasi are now names of barrios in the municipality.

Peñablanca was made a separate municipality by the Spaniards on November 20, 1886. Its first inhabitants were Kalingas (unbaptized Irrayas) and Negritos.

== Geography ==
The municipality is home to the Peñablanca Protected Landscape and Seascape which contains the Callao Cave (part of the Callao Limestone Formation Paleolithic Archaeological Site), one of the province's well-known landmarks and tourist spots.

Peñablanca is situated 6.84 kilometres (4.25 mi) from the provincial capital Tuguegarao, and 492.98 kilometres (306.32 mi) north of the country's capital city of Manila.

=== Barangays ===
Peñablanca is divided into 24 barangays. Each barangay consists of puroks while some have sitios.

- Aggugaddan
- Alimanao
- Baliuag
- Bical
- Bugatay
- Buyun
- Cabasan
- Cabbo
- Callao
- Camasi
- Centro (Poblacion)
- Dodan
- Lapi
- Malibabag
- Mangga
- Minanga
- Nabbabalayan
- Nanguilattan
- Nannarian
- Parabba
- Patagueleg
- Quibal
- San Roque (Litto)
- Sisim

=== Climate ===
Climate data for Peñablanca, Cagayan
Month	Jan	Feb	Mar	Apr	May	Jun	Jul	Aug	Sep	Oct	Nov	Dec	Year
Mean daily maximum °C (°F)	25 (77)	26 (79)	28 (82)	31 (88)	31 (88)	31 (88)	30 (86)	30 (86)	30 (86)	28 (82)	27 (81)	25 (77)	29 (83)
Mean daily minimum °C (°F)	21 (70)	21 (70)	22 (72)	23 (73)	24 (75)	24 (75)	24 (75)	24 (75)	24 (75)	23 (73)	23 (73)	22 (72)	23 (73)
Average precipitation mm (inches)	155 (6.1)	113 (4.4)	89 (3.5)	58 (2.3)	127 (5.0)	131 (5.2)	154 (6.1)	184 (7.2)	151 (5.9)	247 (9.7)	221 (8.7)	292 (11.5)	1,922 (75.6)
Average rainy days	19.6	14.8	13.4	12.0	19.4	19.8	23.0	25.0	23.0	19.4	19.1	21.6	230.1
Source: Meteoblue

== Demographics ==
Population census of Peñablanca
Year	Pop.	±% p.a.
1903	4,969	—
1918	6,478	+1.78%
1939	8,864	+1.50%
1948	8,799	−0.08%
1960	13,119	+3.38%
1970	18,218	+3.33%
1975	21,638	+3.51%
1980	24,888	+2.84%
1990	30,527	+2.06%
1995	33,190	+1.58%
2000	37,872	+2.87%
2007	40,336	+0.87%
2010	42,736	+2.13%
2015	48,584	+2.47%
2020	50,300	+0.73%
2024	50,856	+0.26%
Source: Philippine Statistics Authority

In the 2024 census, the population of Peñablanca was 50,856 people, with a density of 43 inhabitants per square kilometre or 110 inhabitants per square mile.

== Economy ==
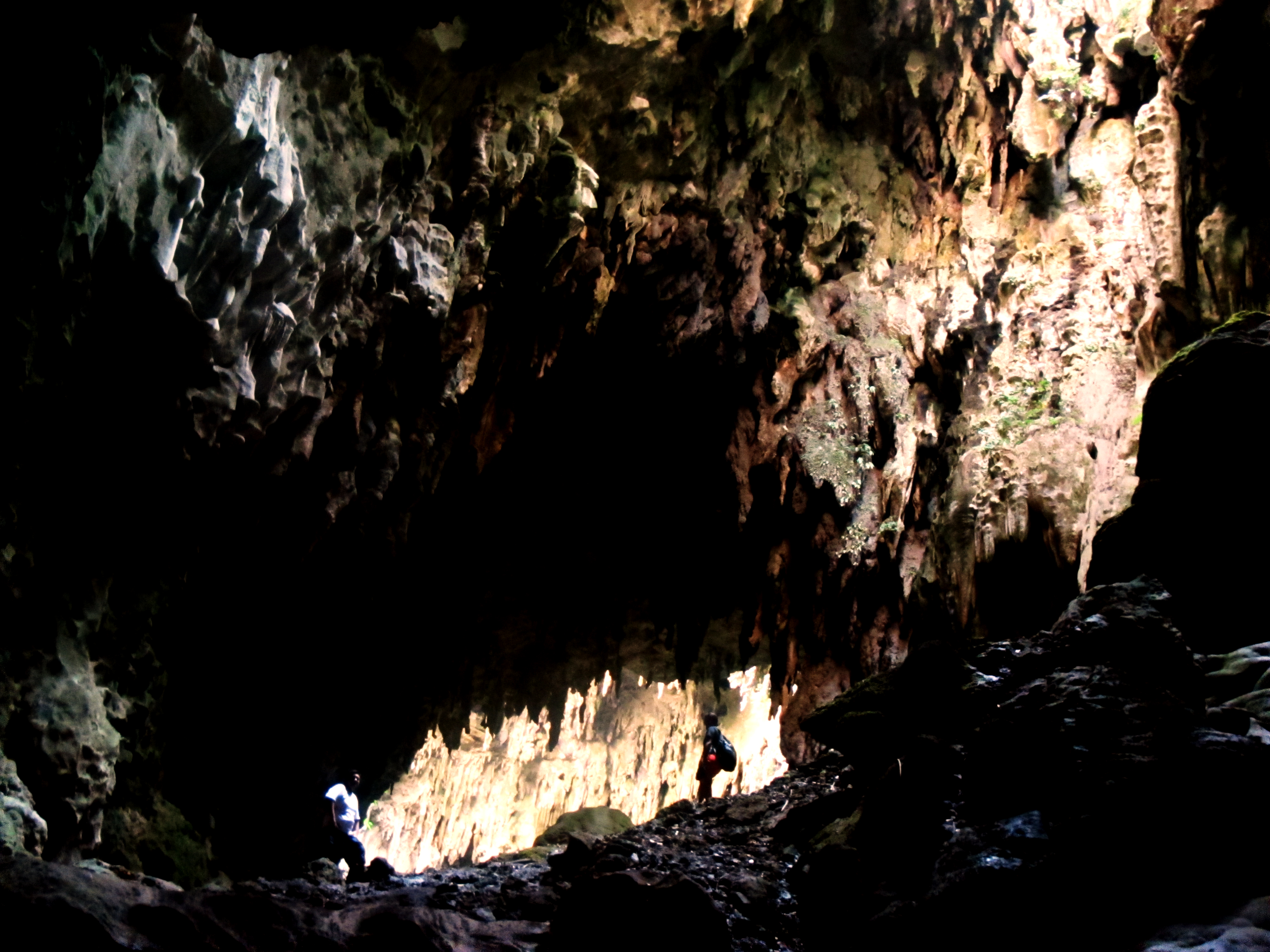
The fifth chamber of the Callao Cave, part of the Callao Limestone Formation Paleolithic Archaeological Site

Poverty incidence of Peñablanca (%)

Source: Philippine Statistics Authority

== Government ==
=== Local government ===
Peñablanca is part of the third legislative district of the province of Cagayan. It is governed by a mayor, designated as its local chief executive_{,} and by a municipal council as its legislative body in accordance with the Local Government Code. The mayor, vice mayor, and the municipal councilors are elected directly by the people through an election held every three years.

=== Elected officials ===
Members of the Municipal Council (2019–2022)
Position	Name
Congressman	Joseph L. Lara
Mayor	Marilyn J. Taguinod
Vice-Mayor	Washington M. Taguinod
Councilors	Ma. Kristina J. Taguinod
Councilors	Rodney D. Mora
Councilors	Efren B. Beleno
Councilors	Eutiquio A. Calagui
Councilors	Pedro Q. Alan
Councilors	Cesar B. Bangayan
Councilors	Jorge C. Taguinod
Councilors	Merwin A. Cuarteros

== Education ==
The Schools Division of Cagayan governs the town's public education system. The division office is a field office of the DepEd in Cagayan Valley region. There are two schools district offices which govern the public and private elementary and high schools throughout the municipality. These are Peñablanca East District, and Peñablanca West District.

=== Primary and elementary schools ===
- Abucay Elementary School
- Alaminnao Elementary School
- Alitontong Elementary School
- Baguio Point Community Scholl
- Baliwag Elementary School
- Bauan Elementary School
- Bical Elementary School
- Bugatay Elementary School
- Buyun Elementary School
- Cabasan Elementary School
- Cabbo Elementary School
- Callao Elementary School
- Dodan Elementary School
- Lagum Elementary School
- Lapi Elementary School
- Little Jesus Christian Academy Minanga Branch
- Little Jesus Christian Academy Vuyun Branch
- Little Jesus Christian Academy Bambang Branch
- Little Jesus Christian Academy Callao Branch
- Little Jesus Christian Academy Sisim Branch
- Little Jesus Christian Academy Lapi Branch
- Little Jesus Christian Academy Roma Branch
- Mangga Elementary School
- Minanga Elementary School
- Nanguillattan Elementary School
- Nannarian Elementary School
- Parabba Elementary School
- Patagueleg Elementary School
- Methodist Christian School of Peñablanca
- Peñablanca East Central School
- Peñablanca West Central School
- Quibal Elementary School
- San Roque Elementary School
- School of Saints Philip and James (Elementary School)
- Sisim Elementary School

=== Secondary schools ===
- Cabbo National High School
- Don Severino Pagalilauan National High School
- International School of Asia and the Pacific
- Peñablanca East National High School
- Peñablanca National High School
- San Jacinto Seminary
- School of Saints Philip and James (Junior High School)

== Media ==
- 94.9 MHz DWEX FMR Cagayan (Philippine Collective Media Corporation)
- 98.1 MHz DWCJ Radyo Bayanian (National Irrigation Administration)
