= Ibanag people =

Ibanag
Total population
- 463,390 (2020 census)

Regions with significant populations
- Philippines (Cagayan and Isabela)

Languages
- Ibanag, Ilocano, Filipino and English

Religion
- Catholicism

The Ibanag (also Ybanag and Ybanak or Ibanak) are an ethnolinguistic minority numbering a little more than half a million people, who inhabit the provinces of Cagayan, Isabela, and Nueva Vizcaya. They are one of the largest ethnolinguistic minorities in the Philippines.

== Etymology ==
The endonym "Ibanag" comes from the prefix I- which means "people of", and bannag, meaning river. This toponym-based name is similar to the unrelated etymology for the Tagalog people, which is derived from taga- ("person from") and ilog ("river")

== Language ==
The Ibanag language (also Ybanag) is spoken by about 500,000 speakers in two of the northeasternmost provinces of the Philippines, Isabela, and Cagayan. It is closely related to Gaddang, Itawis, Agta, Atta, Yogad, Isneg, and Malaweg.

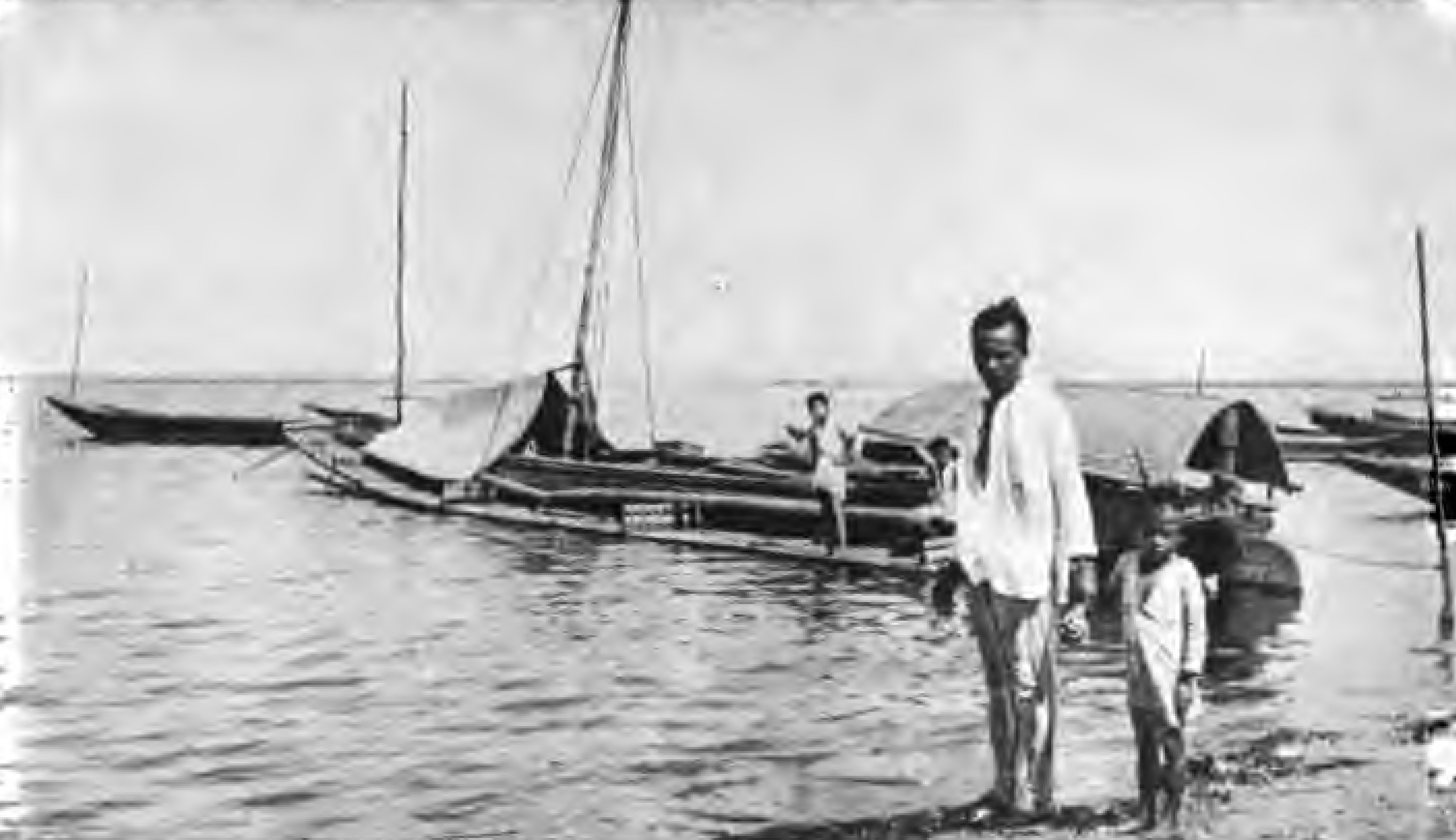
Ibanag balangay (barangayanes) from the Cagayan River in Northern Luzon (c.1917)

It is spoken especially in Tuguegarao and Solana in Cagayan, as well as in the municipalities of Cabagan, San Pablo, Tumauini, Santa Maria, Santo Tomas, Ilagan, Gamu, Naguilian, and Reina Mercedes and San Mariano in Isabela. There are also several speakers of the Ibanag language in Abulug, Aparri, Camalaniugan, Lal-lo, and Tuao in Cagayan. Minority Ibanag speakers can be found outside of their regional homeland, such as Metro Manila, Mindoro, Palawan and Mindanao, particularly in Sulu Archipelago. Most of the speakers can speak Ilocano, the lingua franca of Northern Luzon, as well.

=== Displacement ===
Ibanags speak the same language under the same name. However, due to several factors including the use of Filipino as the national lingua franca and Ilocano as a regional one, the use of Ibanag language has now diminished but remains strong with Ibanags living overseas. Thus while there may still be Ibanags around, the language is slowly being displaced. In addition to this, many if not most Ibanags speak Ilocano, which has over the years, supplanted Ibanag as the more dominant language in the region.
