= Cagayan River =

Longest river in the Philippines

Cagayan River Río Grande de Cagayán
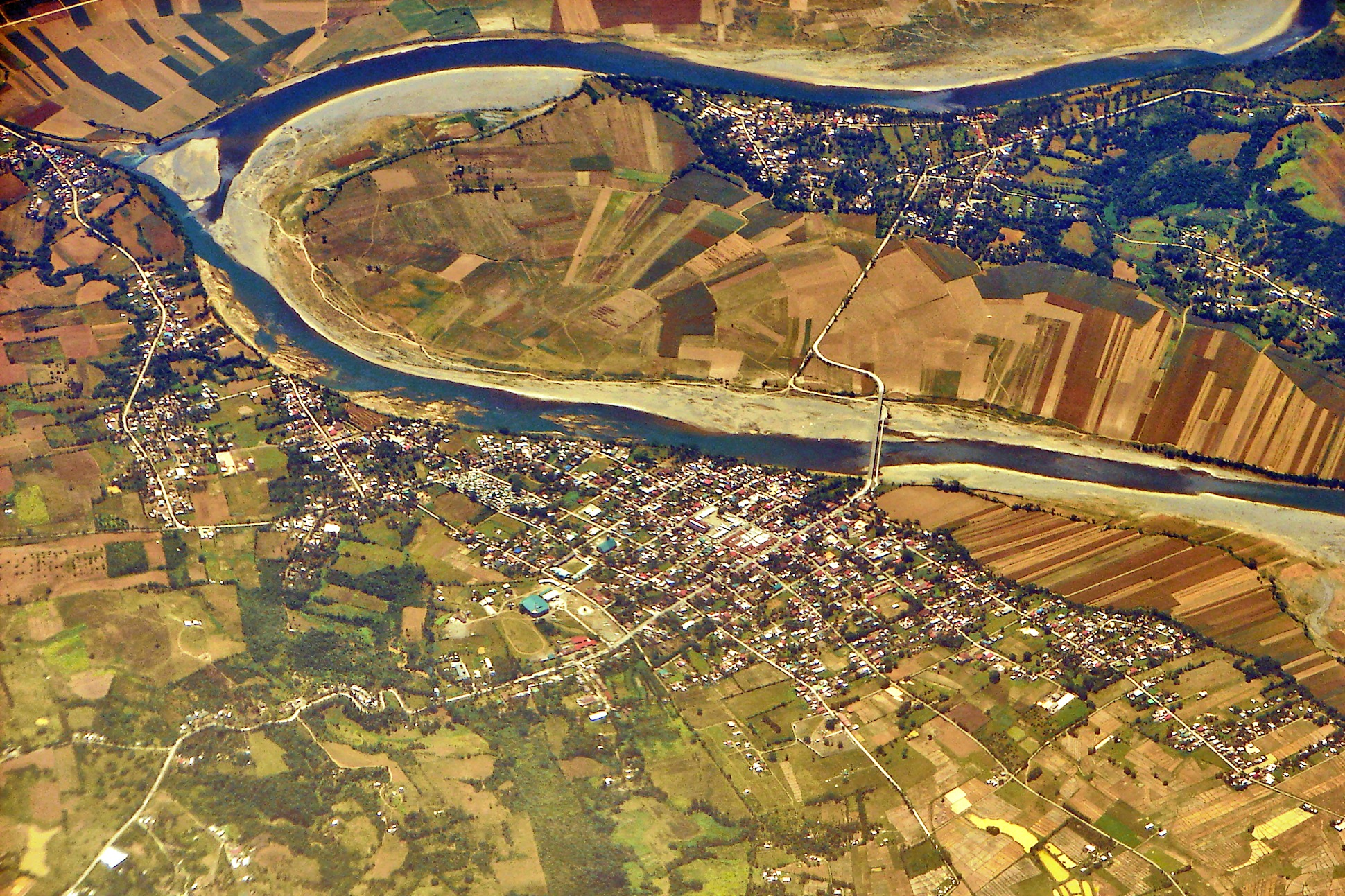
- The river as it passes through Jones in Isabela

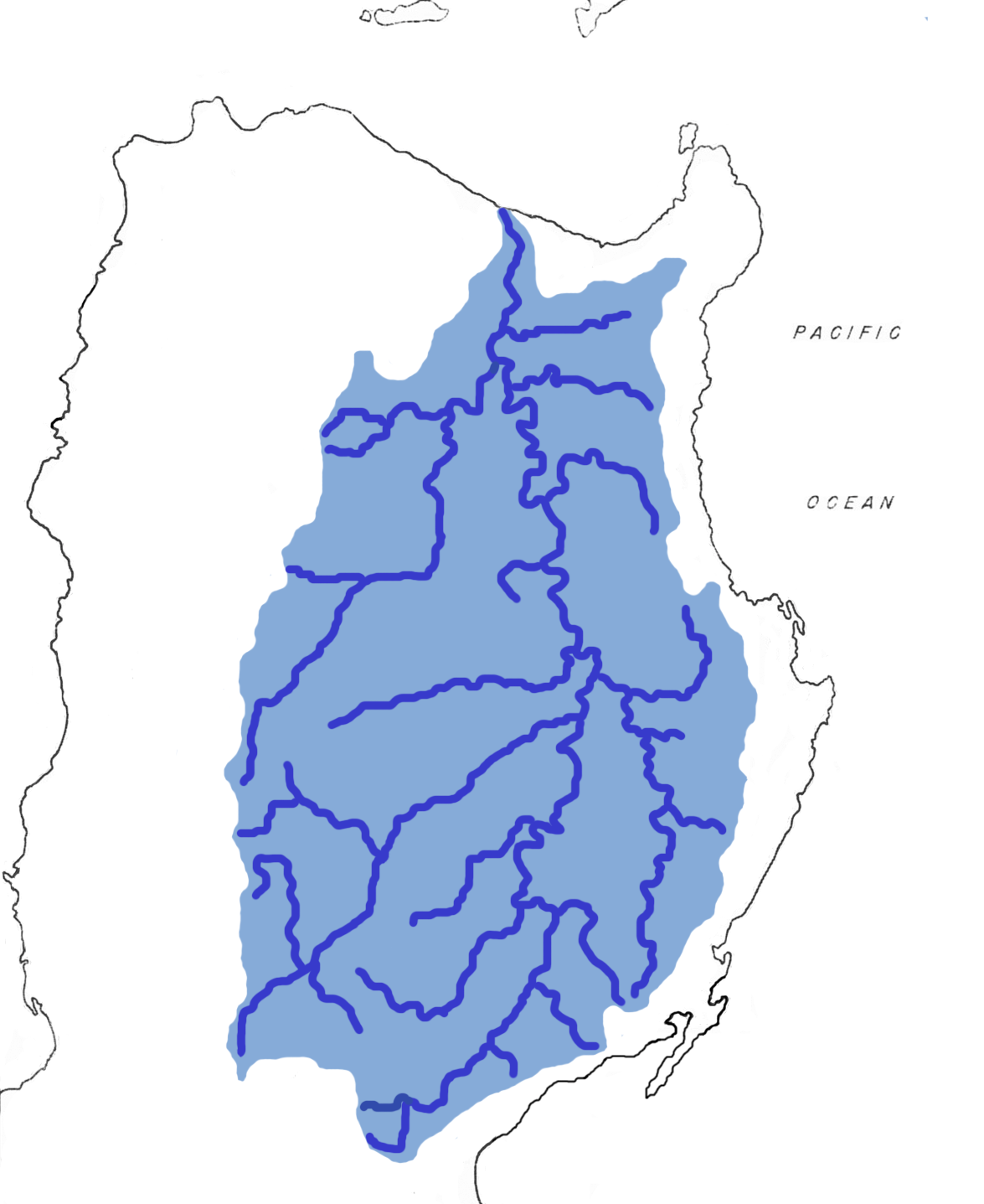
- Drainage area of the river and its tributaries in northeastern Luzon

- Cagayan River mouth Cagayan River (Philippines)
- Native name: Bannag (Ibanag)

Location
- Country: Philippines
- Region: Cagayan Valley, Central Luzon
- Province: Cagayan; Isabela; Nueva Vizcaya; Quirino; Aurora

Physical characteristics
- Source: Caraballo Mountains
  - location: Dupax del Sur, Nueva Vizcaya
  - coordinates: 16°11′08″N 121°08′39″E
  - elevation: 1,524 m (5,000 ft)
- Mouth: Babuyan Channel
  - location: Aparri, Cagayan
  - coordinates: 18°22′N 121°37′E
  - elevation: 0 m (0 ft)
- Length: 505 km (314 mi)
- Basin size: 27,753 km^{2} (10,715 mi^{2})
- Discharge
  - average: 1,740 m^{3}/s (61,000 cu ft/s)
  - maximum: 8,068 m^{3}/s (284,900 cu ft/s)

Basin features
- Tributaries
  - left: Chico River; Magat River
  - right: Ilagan River; Pinacanauan River

The Cagayan River, also known as the Río Grande de Cagayán, is the longest river and the largest river by discharge volume of water in the Philippines. It has a total length of approximately 505 kilometres (314 mi) and a drainage basin covering 27,753 square kilometres (10,715 sq mi). It is located in the Cagayan Valley region in northeastern part of Luzon Island and traverses the provinces of Nueva Vizcaya, Quirino, Isabela and Cagayan; it also flows through the only Central Luzon province of Aurora.

== Topography ==
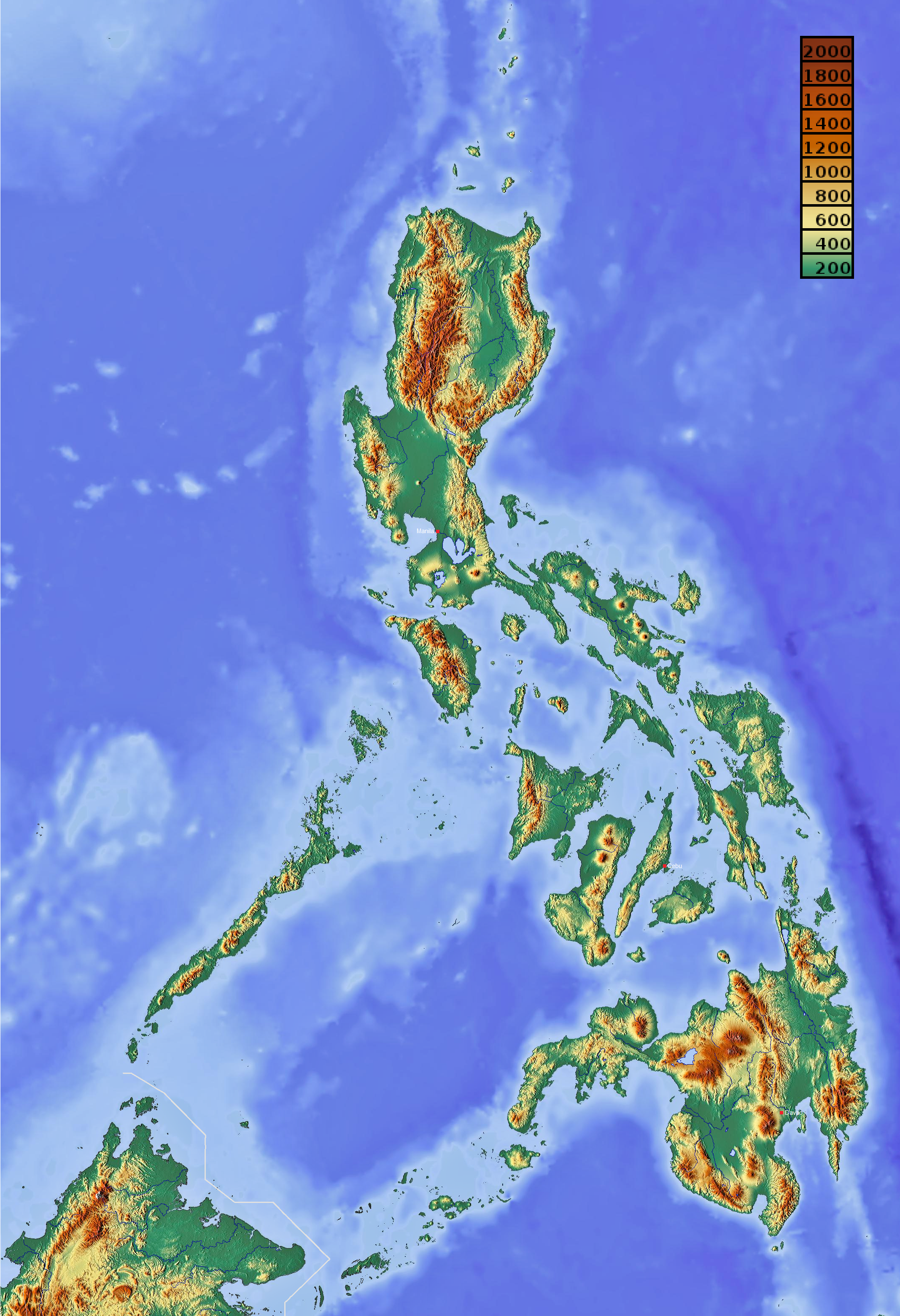
Topography of the Cagayan Valley
(marked by an X)
in northeastern Luzon.

The river's headwaters are at the Caraballo Mountains of the Central Luzon at an elevation of approximately 1,524 metres (5,000 ft). The river flows north for some 505 kilometres (314 mi) to its mouth at the Babuyan Channel near the town of Aparri, Cagayan. The river drops rapidly to 91 metres (299 ft) above sea level some 227 kilometres (141 mi) from the river mouth. Its principal tributaries are the Pinacanauan, Chico, Siffu, Mallig, Magat and Ilagan Rivers.

Magat River, is the largest tributary with an estimated annual discharge of 9,808 million cubic meters. It lies in the southwestern portion of the basin, stretching approximately 150 kilometres (93 mi) from Nueva Vizcaya down to its confluence with Cagayan River about 55 kilometres (34 mi) from the river mouth.

Both Magat and Chico Rivers have extensive drainage areas which comprise about 1/3 of the whole basin.

The Ilagan River originates from the western slopes of the Sierra Madre and drains the eastern central portion of the Cagayan River basin with an estimated yearly discharge of 9,455 million cubic meters. It flows westward and joins the Cagayan River at Ilagan, Isabela, 200 kilometres (120 mi) from the mouth.

The Siffu-Mallig system lies on the slope of the Central Cordillera ranges flowing almost parallel to the Magat River. Marshes and swamps are found in some parts of its lower reaches.

Cagayan River and its tributaries have deposited sediments of Tertiary and Quaternary origin, mostly limestone sands and clays, throughout the relatively flat Cagayan Valley which is surrounded by the Cordillera Mountains in the west, Sierra Madre in the east and the Caraballo Mountains in the south.

The river has a drainage area of about 27,300 square kilometres (10,500 sq mi). in the provinces of Apayao, Aurora, Cagayan, Ifugao, Isabela, Kalinga, Mountain Province, Nueva Vizcaya, and Quirino.

The estimated annual discharge is 53,943 million cubic meters with a groundwater reserve of 47,895 million cubic meters.

== Flooding ==
The Cagayan River and its tributaries are subject to extensive flooding during the monsoon season in Southeast Asia from May to November.

The average annual rainfall in 1,000 millimetres (39 in) in the northern part and 3,000 millimetres (120 in) in the southern mountains where the river's headwaters lie. Water from the mountains flow down very slowly because of surface retention over the extensive flood plain, the gorges in the gently-sloping mountains and the meandering course of the river.

Inundations of the Cagayan River and its tributaries have caused great loss of life and property and substantial losses to the local and national economies. The Philippine government has established several flood warning stations along the river. Experts are specifically monitoring the lower reaches from Tuguegarao to Aparri and the alluvial plain from Ilagan to Tumauini, Isabela.

In November 2020, after the onslaught of Typhoon Vamco (Ulysses), the river reached its peak level and caused floods along its vicinity due to the rainfall accumulated from the typhoon. This flooding was one of the worst floods in the river's history. The Magat Dam also contributed to the floods along the river when its floodgates opened due to a potential overflow.

== Flora and fauna ==
The Cagayan River passes through one of the few remaining primary forests in the Philippines.

It supports the lives of numerous endemic and endangered species, like the Luzon bleeding-heart pigeon (Gallicolumba luzonica), Philippine eagle (Pithecophaga jefferyi) and a rare riverine fish, locally called ludong (Cestreaus plicatilis).

The ludong spawns in Cagayan River's upper reaches in Jones, Isabela. In late October until mid-November, the fish travel down the river to release their eggs at the river mouth near Aparri.

In February, ludong fry by the millions are again caught in fine nets as these travel upstream.

Due to the dwindling number of ludong caught yearly, local governments have imposed a ban on catching the fish and its fry, but the ban has failed.

== People ==
The river traverses four provinces: Nueva Vizcaya, Quirino, Isabela and Cagayan. These provinces have an approximate population of two million people, mostly farmers and indigenous tribesmen.

The Ibanag people derive their tribe's name from Cagayan River's ancient name, Bannag. The Gaddang tribe lived in the upper reaches of the Cagayan River and its tributaries.

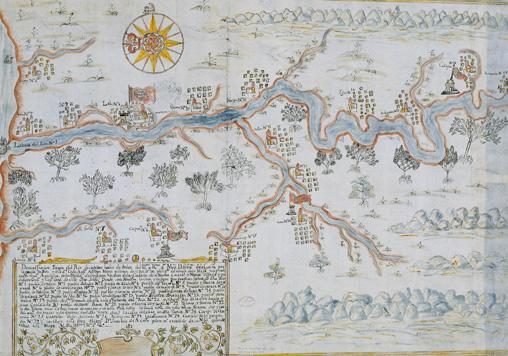
An old drawn geographical description of Cagayan River (Juan Luis de Acosta, Circa 1720)

== Economic importance ==
The river drains a fertile valley that produces a variety of crops, including rice, corn, bananas, coconut, mangoes, citrus and tobacco.

Fish were a plentiful source of nutrition for centuries, but in recent decades issues such as fertilizer runoff, destructive fishing methods and a burgeoning human population have led to a great decline in the river's fish stocks. With worsening weather patterns and regular severe storms, even traditional agricultural means are insufficient to feed families although they were bountiful in the past century, leading to the more aggressive use of destructive techniques. This has been part of a vicious cycle of environmental degradation.

Families still go to the banks of the river and its tributaries to wash clothes or have picnics.

Until recently, boatmen would provide ferry service. For example, the towns of Lasam and Gattaran are directly across the river from each other. A crossing by boat was the most convenient, but emergencies could be dangerous, such as having to fetch the doctor in Gattaran during a storm at night. Now the best way is by vehicle over the Magapit bridge.

There are dams in two of the river's tributaries, the Magat and Chico Rivers, and there are also several mining concessions in the mineral-rich Cordillera Mountains near the headwaters of the two tributary rivers.

The provincial governments along the river have also developed tourism programs that offer activities on the river, particularly whitewater rafting.

== Crossings ==
From mouth to source:

- Magapit Suspension Bridge ( AH 26 (N1) (Pan-Philippine Highway), Lal-lo, Cagayan)
- Buntun Bridge ( N51 (Santiago–Tuguegarao Road), Tuguegarao City and Solana, Cagayan)
- Santa Maria Overflow Bridge (Cabagan–Santa Maria Road, Santa Maria and Cabagan, Isabela)
- Cansan-Bagutari Overflow Bridge (Cabagan-Santo Tomas Road, Cabagan and Santo Tomas, Isabela)
- Delfin Albano Bridge (Ilagan–Delfin Albano–Mallig Road, Delfin Albano and Tumauini, Isabela)
- Lullutan Bridge (Ilagan–Delfin Albano–Mallig Road, Ilagan, Isabela)
- Gamu Bridge (Gamu–Roxas Road, Gamu, Isabela)
- Naguilian Bridge ( AH 26 (N1) (Pan-Philippine Highway), Naguilian, Isabela)
- Alicaocao Overflow Bridge (Cauayan, Isabela)
- New Pigalo Bridge (Angadanan–Alicia Road, Angadanan, Isabela)
- Anafunan Overflow Bridge (Echague, Isabela)
- Gucab Overflow Bridge (Echague, Isabela)
- Dalibubon Bridge (Santiago–San Agustin Road and Echague–Jones–Maddela Road, Echague and Jones, Isabela)
- Jones II Bridge (Santiago–San Agustin Road, Jones, Isabela)
- San Pedro Bridge (Maddela, Quirino)
- Dumabato Bridge (Maddela, Quirino)
- Abbag Bridge (Cordon–Diffun–Maddela–Aurora Road, Nagtipunan, Quirino)

The Pan-Philippine Highway generally follows the course of the river from Echague until the Magapit Suspension Bridge where it continues west.

== See also ==
- List of rivers of the Philippines
