= Eagle Island =

Eagle Island or Eagle Islands may refer to:

== Antarctica ==
- Eagle Island, Antarctica

== Atlantic Ocean ==
- The former name of Speedwell Island, one of the Falkland Islands

== Australia ==
- Eagle Island (Queensland)
- Eagle Island (Western Australia)

== Canada ==
- One of the Tusket Islands in Nova Scotia

== Indian Ocean ==
- Eagle Islands, Chagos Archipelago
- Eagle island (or Île Aigle), Chagos Archipelago
- Rémire Island (or Eagle Island), an island in Seychelles

== Ireland ==
- Eagle Island, County Mayo

== United Kingdom ==
- Eagle Island, County Fermanagh, a townland in County Fermanagh, Northern Ireland

== United States ==
- Eagle Island (Alabama), see List of islands of Alabama
- Eagle Island, Alaska, near Grayling, Alaska
- Eagle Island (Casco Bay, Maine)
- Eagle Island (Penobscot Bay, Maine)
- Eagle Island (Worcester County, Maryland), see List of islands of Maryland
- Eagle Island (Massachusetts), see List of islands of Massachusetts
- Eagle Island, in Sodus Bay (Lake Ontario), New York
- Eagle Island (North Carolina), in New Hanover County, North Carolina
- Eagle Island (Pennsylvania)
- Eagle Island (Washington)
- Eagle Island (Wisconsin)
- Eagle Island Camp, New York

== In fiction ==
- A fictional island in the 2019 animated film The Angry Birds Movie 2

== See also ==
- Eagle Island State Park (disambiguation)
