= SEAL Awards =

Environmental award

SEAL Awards are an environmental advocacy organization that uses annual awards for businesses and journalists to support environmental initiatives and to fund grants in the field of policy research. The name is an acronym for sustainability, environmental achievement, and leadership. The Awards were created in 2017 by businessman Matt Harney.

== Award categories ==
=== Business Sustainability Awards ===
These awards honor corporate sustainability initiatives, sustainable products, and environmentally responsible innovation. Application fees for this award fund social impact campaigns and research grants.

=== Environmental Journalism Awards ===
Twelve journalists each year receive recognition for environmental reporting, particularly investigative journalism. Past award winners include writers for traditional news media such as The Guardian and more recent, web-based platforms like Grist and Mongabay.

Award Winners
Year of award	Journalist	Publication
2017	Damian Carrington	The Guardian
2017	Elizabeth Kolbert	The New Yorker
2017	Marianne Lavelle	Inside Climate News
2017	Rebecca Leber	Mother Jones
2017	Robinson Meyer	The Atlantic
2017	George Monbiot	The Guardian
2017	Chris Mooney	The Washington Post
2017	Adele Peters	Fast Company
2017	Brad Plumer	The New York Times
2017	Dave Roberts	Vox
2018	Damian Carrington	The Guardian
2018	Julie Cart	CalMatters
2018	Megan Geuss	Ars Technica
2018	Nathanael Johnson	Grist
2018	Alexander Kaufman	HuffPost
2018	Stephen Leahy	National Geographic, Vice
2018	Chris Mooney	The Washington Post
2018	James Munson	Bloomberg Environment
2018	Brad Plumer	The New York Times
2018	Dave Roberts	Vox
2018	Hiroko Tabuchi	The New York Times
2018	Jonathan Watts	The Guardian
2019	Emily Atkin	HEATED
2019	Lisa Friedman	The New York Times
2019	Yessenia Funues	Earther/Gizmodo
2019	Fiona Harvey	The Guardian
2019	Umair Irfan	Vox
2019	Stephen Leahy	National Geographic
2019	Robinson Meyer	The Atlantic
2019	Adele Peters	Fast Company
2019	Dave Roberts	Vox
2019	Hiroko Tabuchi	The New York Times
2019	Jonathan Watts	The Guardian
2019	Justin Worland	Time
2020	Jeff Brady	NPR
2020	Rhett Ayers Butler	Mongabay
2020	Juliet Eilperin	The Washington Post
2020	Lisa Friedman	The New York Times
2020	Fiona Harvey	The Guardian
2020	Mary Annaïse Heglar	Hot Take
2020	Brian Kahn	Earther
2020	Alexander Kaufman	HuffPost
2020	Shannon Osaka	Grist
2020	Dave Roberts	Volts
2020	James Temple	MIT Technology Review
2020	Zoya Teirstein	Grist
2021	Hilary Beaumont	Al Jazeera English, The Guardian
2021	Rebecca Leber	Vox, Grist, Mother Jones
2021	Robinson Meyer	The Atlantic
2021	Dharna Noor	The Boston Globe, Earther
2021	Justin Worland	Time
2021	Shannon Osaka	Grist
2021	Rachel Ramirez	CNN
2021	Dave Roberts	Volts
2021	Somini Sengupta	The New York Times
2021	David Sheppard	Forbes, The Financial Times
2021	Lisa Song	ProPublica
2021	Zahra Hirji	Bloomberg News, BuzzFeed News
2022	Ainslie Cruickshank	The Narwhal
2022	Basten Gokkon	Mongabay
2022	Emily Holden	Floodlight
2022	Karla Mendes	Mongabay
2022	Sophie Mbugua	Africa Climate News
2022	Dana Nuccitelli	Yale Climate Connections
2022	Mark Olalde	ProPublica
2022	Naveena Sadasivam	Grist
2022	Richa Syal	The Guardian, National Geographic
2022	Molly Taft	Earther/Gizmodo
2022	Sharon Udasin	The Hill
2022	John Macracken	Grist, Sierra Magazine
2023	Tony Briscoe	Los Angeles Times
2023	Anton L. Delgado	Southeast Asia Globe
2023	Darryl Fears	The Washington Post
2023	Rachel Frazin	The Hill
2023	Joydeep Gupta	The Third Pole (Dialogue Earth)
2023	Hans Nicholas Jong	Mongabay
2023	Lois Farrow Parshley	The Atlantic, National Geographic
2023	Emily Pontecorvo	Heatmap News
2023	Maxwell Radwin	Mongabay
2023	Saqib Rahim	Politico, E&E News
2023	Sabrina Shankman	The Boston Globe
2023	Kate Yoder	Grist
2024	Dylan Baddour	Inside Climate News
2024	Catherine Early	Reuters, Dialogue Earth
2024	Josh Gabbatiss	Carbon Brief
2024	Chelsea Harvey	Politico
2024	Anita Hofschneider	Grist
2024	Adam Mahoney	Capital B News
2024	Ellen Ormesher	DeSmog, The Guardian
2024	Spoorthy Raman	Mongabay, Hakai Magazine
2024	Matt Simon	Grist
2024	Maanvi Singh	The Guardian
2024	Fatima Syed	The Narwhal
2024	Aliya Uteuova	The Guardian
2025	Eva Xiao	Financial Times
2025	Malavika Vyawahare	Mongabay
2025	Hayley Smith	L.A. Times
2025	Juan Pablo Ramírez Franco	Grist, Chicago Public Media
2025	Monica Piccini	The Canary, The Ecologist
2025	Brendan Montague	DeSmog, The Ecologist
2025	Maria Mónica Monsalve	El País
2025	Sankit Jain	Insight Walk,Yale Climate Connections
2025	Jael Holzman	Heatmap
2025	Aarón Cantú	Capital & Main
2025	Sheere Bega	The Mail & Guardian
2025	Amudalat Ajasa	The Washington Post
2026	Aman Azhar	Inside Climate News
2026	Nick Engelfried	Sierra Magazine, Columbia Insight
2026	Keerti Gopal	Inside Climate News
2026	Zeke Hausfather	Carbon Brief, Climate Brink
2026	Robert Hunziker	Counter Currents
2026	Mariana Mastache-Maldonado	El País, Ladera Sur
2026	Tulani Ngwenya	Oxpeckers, Gizmodo
2026	Elizabeth Ouzts	Canary Media, Mother Jones
2026	Juan Carlos Partida	La Jornada
2026	Dyna Rochmyaningsih	Mongabay, National Geographic
2026	Matt Simmons	The Narwhal
2026	Ayesha Tandon	Carbon Brief

=== Impact Campaigns ===
SEAL Awards have advocated for the creation of a credit card whose interchange fees would pay into climate change programs rather than a traditional credit rewards program, targeted cup waste in the Starbucks café chain and Yelp reviews of restaurants using plastic straws, and endorsed Jay Inslee for the 2020 United States presidential campaign. The environmental rewards credit card was presented as an open-source concept in a detailed business case launch memo.

=== Environmental Research Grants ===
The research award is a monetary grant for graduate students and post-doctoral researchers at the beginning of their careers in environmental policy.
