= Eagle Islands =

Island group in the Indian Ocean

Coordinates: 06°12′S 71°19′E

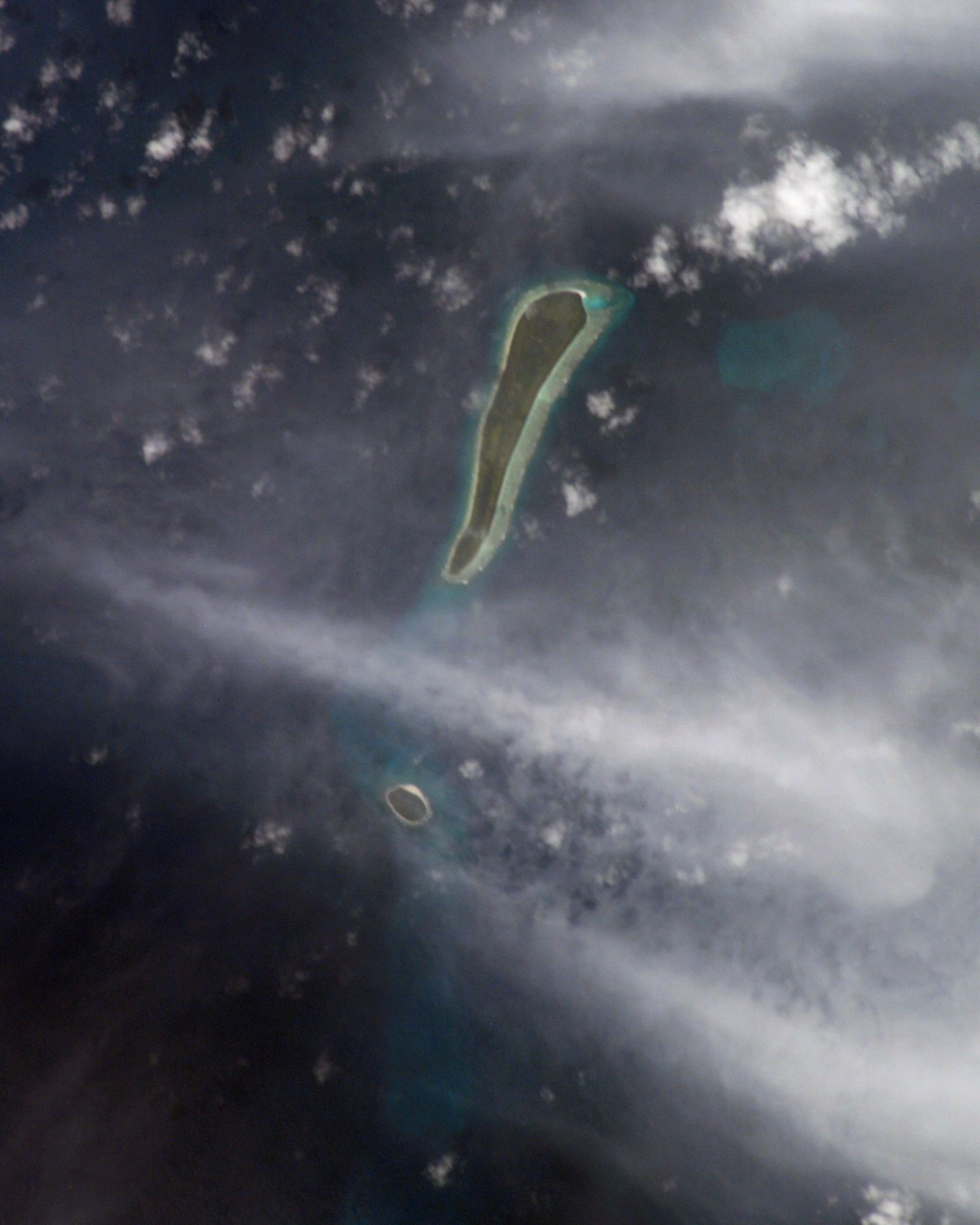
NASA picture of Eagle Islands. The round, smaller island is Sea Cow Island.

Eagle Islands is a group of two islands in the Chagos Archipelago. They are located on the central-western rim of the Great Chagos Bank, which is the world's largest coral atoll structure.

== Islands ==
With a land area of 2.45 km^{2}, Île Aigle is the largest single island of the Great Chagos Bank, and after Diego Garcia the second largest of the Chagos Archipelago.

- Eagle Island (Île Aigle)
- Sea Cow Island

== History ==
There was once a coconut plantation in Ile Aigle, as well as a small settlement of Chagossian plantation workers. But at the time of Commander Robert Moresby's survey of the Chagos in 1838, this island was populated only occasionally. Not long after the settlement of the Chagos group by the French planters at the end of the 18th century, the tendency was to concentrate the workers on only a few islands from which the plantations were run, like Ile Boddam in the Salomon Atoll.

In 1975 during the Joint Services Expedition to Danger Island (JSDI), the expedition members were taken by RFA Resurgent to Eagle Islands and then by ketch and inflatable craft to Danger Island and onward to Three Brothers. The expedition made a topographical survey of the coral reefs, an ecological survey of the corals on it and a study on the metabolism of the reef. A reference collection of samples of the flora and fauna of the area was also undertaken.

Since 1998 the islands are part of the Chagos Archipelago Strict Nature Reserve; it is forbidden to land on the islands or to anchor a boat nearby. The islands have large populations of nesting seabirds.
