= Dilrukshi Handunnetti =

Sri Lankan investigative journalist and editor

- Occupations: Journalist, editor, lawyer
- Known for: Investigative journalism; co-founder of the Center for Investigative Reporting

Dilrukshi Handunnetti is a Sri Lankan investigative journalist, editor and lawyer. She is a co-founder and director of the Center for Investigative Reporting (CIR) in Sri Lanka and is the Sri Lanka editor of Mongabay. Her reporting has covered governance, corruption, conflict, gender, health and environmental issues.

Handunnetti has held senior editorial positions at several Sri Lankan publications, including The Sunday Leader, Sunday Observer and Weekend Express. Her work has appeared in international publications including The Guardian, The New York Times, Al Jazeera, The New Humanitarian, Himal Southasian and Mongabay.

== Career ==
Handunnetti is a lawyer by training and began her career as a journalist in Sri Lanka. She led the investigations desk at The Sunday Leader before taking senior editorial positions at other Sri Lankan publications.

She later served as Senior Associate Editor of the Sunday Observer and Consultant Editor of the Weekend Express.

Her journalism has focused on investigative reporting, governance, corruption, political affairs, conflict, gender, health and environmental issues. She has also worked as a journalism trainer and researcher, particularly in investigative journalism and media development.

== Investigative journalism ==
Handunnetti has reported on corruption, governance, political affairs, conflict and communities affected by war, as well as environmental and gender issues.

Her reporting on the relocation of more than 300 war-displaced families in northern Sri Lanka received a merit award for Reporting Under Special Circumstances at the Sri Lanka Journalism Awards for Excellence in 2012.

In the same year, she received the Mervyn de Silva Journalist of the Year Award at the Sri Lanka Journalism Awards for Excellence for her work at Ceylon Today.

Earlier in her career, Handunnetti received the Denzil Peiris Award for Young Reporter of the Year in 2000 and the Best Environmental Report of the Year award in 2001. She also received the D. B. Dhanapala Award for Journalist of the Year in the English-language press in 2005.

In 2006, she was part of a nine-member team that received an award for Best Science Journalism on the World Wide Web for coverage of the 2004 Indian Ocean tsunami.

In 2014, she received the WASH Media Award in the Millennium Development Goals monitoring category for reporting on school sanitation and its effect on girls.

== Center for Investigative Reporting ==
Handunnetti co-founded the Center for Investigative Reporting (CIR) in Colombo. The organisation describes itself as a media institution dedicated to investigative journalism in Sri Lanka and South Asia, including investigative reporting, collaborative journalism, journalism training and media literacy.

She served as CIR's executive director for four years and subsequently became a director of the organisation.

Through CIR, Handunnetti has been involved in journalism training and discussions concerning investigative journalism, media accountability and reporting during crises.

In 2026, she participated in journalism training organised by CIR and the United Nations Population Fund concerning reporting on extreme heat and climate-related issues.

== International journalism ==
Handunnetti's reporting has appeared in international publications including The Guardian, The New York Times, Al Jazeera, The New Humanitarian, Himal Southasian and Mongabay.

She is a columnist for The New Indian Express, where her articles have covered Sri Lankan and South Asian political, social and international affairs.

Her work has included reporting from a civilian perspective on Sri Lanka's armed conflict as well as reporting on governance, corruption, South Asian affairs and environmental issues.

== Environmental journalism ==
Environmental reporting has been a significant part of Handunnetti's journalism. She received the Best Environmental Report of the Year award at the Sri Lanka Journalism Awards for Excellence in 2001 and later received the WASH Media Award in 2014.

She subsequently became the Sri Lanka editor of Mongabay, an international environmental news organisation. Her reporting and editorial work for the publication covers environmental governance, conservation, climate change, health and communities in Sri Lanka.

Mongabay's author archive lists hundreds of stories associated with Handunnetti's journalism and editorial work in Sri Lanka.

== Media advocacy and training ==
Handunnetti has worked with organisations concerned with media freedom, journalism training and the professional development of journalists, particularly women journalists.

She has been involved with the Sri Lankan chapter of South Asian Women in Media and has worked with journalists across South Asia as a trainer and mentor.

In 2022, she received the Journalist of Courage and Impact Award from the East-West Center in recognition of her journalism.

In November 2022, she became a Vital Voices Fellow as part of the organisation's global fellowship programme for women leaders.

She has also participated in regional journalism programmes organised by the International Federation of Journalists and other journalism organisations.

== Later work ==
Handunnetti continues to work as a journalist, editor and journalism trainer. In 2024, she participated in a Sri Lankan media forum concerning the role of journalism in elections.

In 2026, she continued to publish commentary through The New Indian Express and participate in journalism and climate-reporting initiatives in Sri Lanka.
