= Emma Gilchrist =

Canadian journalist

- Born: Northern Alberta
- Known for: Editor-in-Chief, The Narwhal

Emma Gilchrist is the Canadian co-founder and editor-in-chief of The Narwhal.

Gilchrist was the executive director of DeSmog environmental blog and the past president of Press Forward association of Canadian independent media outlets.

== Early life and education ==
Gilchrist is from rural Northern Alberta and has a journalism degree from Mount Royal University who awarded her a Horizon Award in 2015.

== Career ==
Gilchrist has worked as a reporter in the United Kingdom and Canada, and has worked at the Calgary Herald and the Calgary Sun. She created a weekly column at the Calgary Herald called The Green Guide which won a Canadian Newspaper Association Great Ideas Award.

Gilchrist was the executive director of DeSmog environmental blog and was credited for providing content for Donald Gutstein's 2018 book The Big Stall. In 2018, she co-founded The Narwhal with Carol Linnitt. In 2018 she accepted four Canadian Online Publishing Awards on behalf of The Narwhal and in 2021 was part of a team that won a 2021 Digital Publishing Award for Best Digital Editorial Package for their report Carbon Cache.

Gilchrist is the past chair of Press Forward association of independent Canadian news organizations.

She won a Clean50 sustainability award in 2022.

== Personal life ==
Gilchrist lives in Victoria.
