= Three Brothers, Chagos =

Three small coral islands on the Great Chagos Bank

Coordinates: 06°09′S 71°31′E

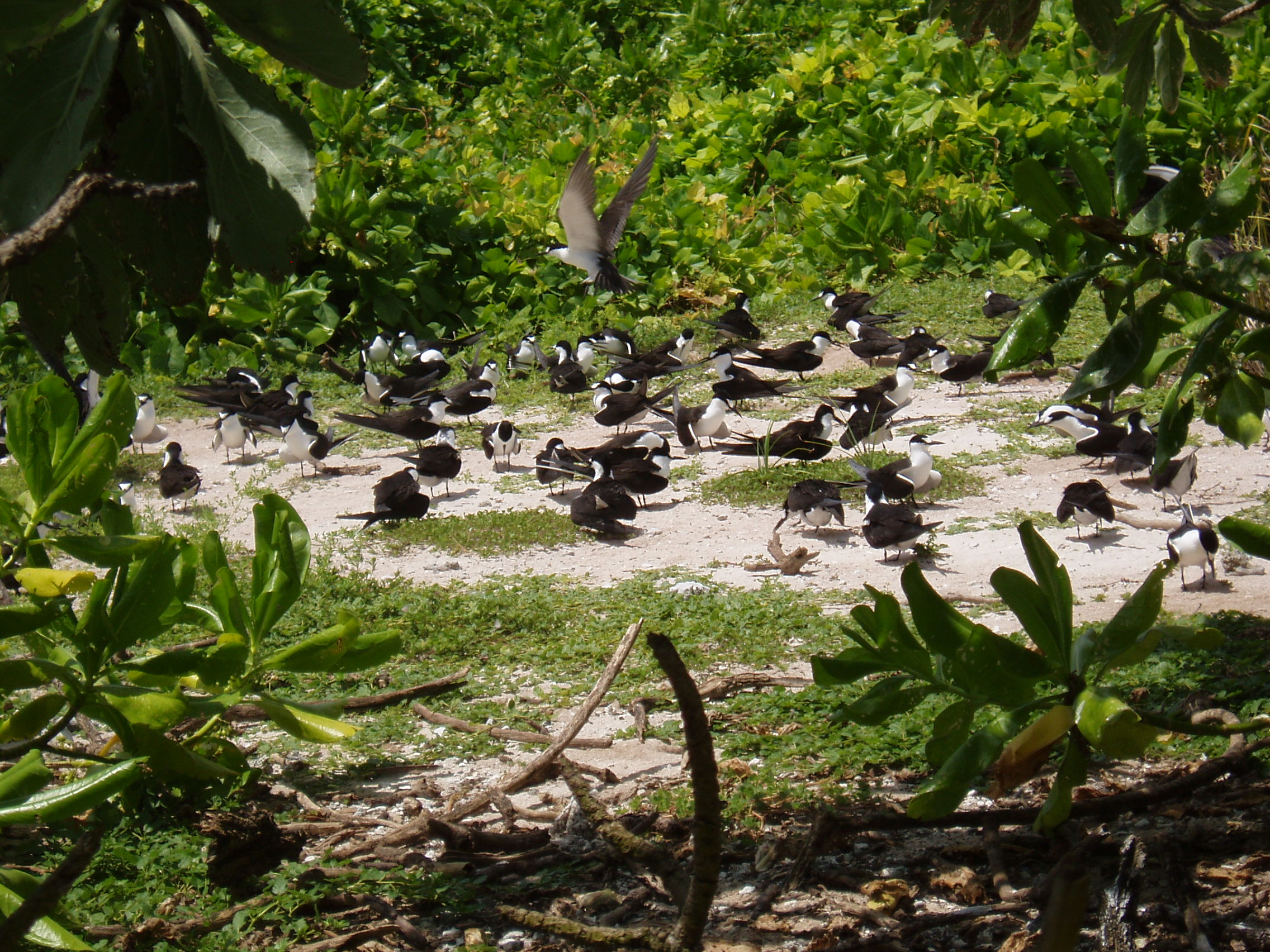
Sooty terns nesting in South Brother Island

The Three Brothers are a group of three small uninhabited coral islands in the British Indian Ocean Territory. It is located along the south-west of the Chagos Archipelago. The islands are part of the Chagos Marine Protected Area since 1998 and support various species of seabirds and marine organisms.

== History ==
The islands are part of the Chagos Archipelago, which comprises 60 islands across seven atolls in the Indian Ocean. While small settlements came up in the 18th century, it was permanently occupied by the British after the Napoleonic Wars. The coconut plantations were leased and sold to Mauritian and Seychellois settlers to produce oil. In the 20th century, the archipelago was detached when Mauritius was granted independence in the 1960s, and is subject to a sovereignty dispute between Mauritius and the United Kingdom since then.

== Geography ==
Three Brothers are a group of three small uninhabited coral islands in the Chagos Archipelago of the British Indian Ocean Territory. It is located along the south western part of the archipelago in the Great Chagos Bank, which is the world's largest coral atoll structure. The islands are low-lying atolls surrounding lagoons, with restricted access and special permits required to visit the islands. The islands are part of the 640,000 km^{2} (250,000 sq mi) Chagos Marine Protected Area since 1998. The islands are covered by patches of hardwood forests.

== Biodiversity ==
The shallow coral reefs and sea plains around the islands of the archipelago support various species of fishes and other aquatic organisms. The islands serve as important birding sites for seabirds as masked booby, red-footed booby, and lesser noddy.

In 1975 during the Joint Services Expedition to Danger Island, the expedition members were taken by RFA Resurgent to Eagle Islands, then by ketch and inflatable craft to Danger Island, and then to Three Brothers. The expedition made a topographical survey of the coral reefs, an ecological survey of the Pangus corals on it, and a study on the metabolism of the reef. A reference collection of samples of the flora and fauna of the area was also undertaken during the expedition.
