= Seacow (disambiguation) =

The Seacow is an order of aquatic mammals.

Seacow or Sea Cow may also refer to:

- Ile Vache Marine, British Indian Ocean Territory
- Seacow Head Light, Canada
- Seacow Pond, Prince Edward Island, Canada
- Steller's sea cow
- Sea cow path, Magdalen Islands, Canada
