= Aqsho Bintang Nusantara =

Indonesian student activist and organizational leader

Aqsho Bintang Nusantara is an Indonesian student activist and organizational leader from Bogor Regency, West Java. He is the chairman of the Bogor Regency branch of the Pergerakan Mahasiswa Islam Indonesia (PMII), a position he has held since 2025.

== Career ==
=== Environmental activism ===
Bintang Nusantara became involved in public advocacy concerning development and environmental issues in Cigombong, Bogor Regency. In November 2024, he served as coordinator of a community action concerning the development of the Lido Special Economic Zone (KEK Lido). The action presented several demands concerning the project's impact on local communities.

In May 2025, Mongabay identified Bintang Nusantara as an environmental activist from Cigombong in its coverage of allegations of pollution affecting Lido Lake and the development of the Lido Special Economic Zone. He criticized the handling of the case and called for transparency in the legal process.

=== PMII leadership ===
Before becoming chairman at the regency level, Bintang Nusantara served as chairman of the PMII commission at Djuanda University. In January 2025, he was quoted during the organization's third Basic Cadre Training program, where he discussed strengthening cadre development and ideological education.

On 30–31 October 2025, Bintang Nusantara was elected chairman of the Bogor Regency branch of PMII at its 24th branch conference. He ran as candidate number 3 from the Djuanda University commission and received 12 votes.

His election was followed by his formal inauguration as chairman in January 2026. In statements reported by Radio Republik Indonesia (RRI), Bintang Nusantara emphasized cooperation among academia, government, civil society and media in addressing issues affecting Bogor Regency.

During his tenure, the Bogor Regency branch organized cadre-development programs, including an ideological training program and a branch-level instructor training program in 2026. Bintang Nusantara was quoted in coverage of the programs discussing cadre development and organizational education.

=== Public advocacy ===
In May 2026, Bintang Nusantara was quoted as chairman of PMII Bogor Regency in coverage of the organization's submission of an amicus curiae in a constitutional challenge concerning Indonesia's Pesantren Law. The organization submitted its position in proceedings before the Constitutional Court of Indonesia.
