= RFA Stromness =

1966 Ness-class combat stores ship

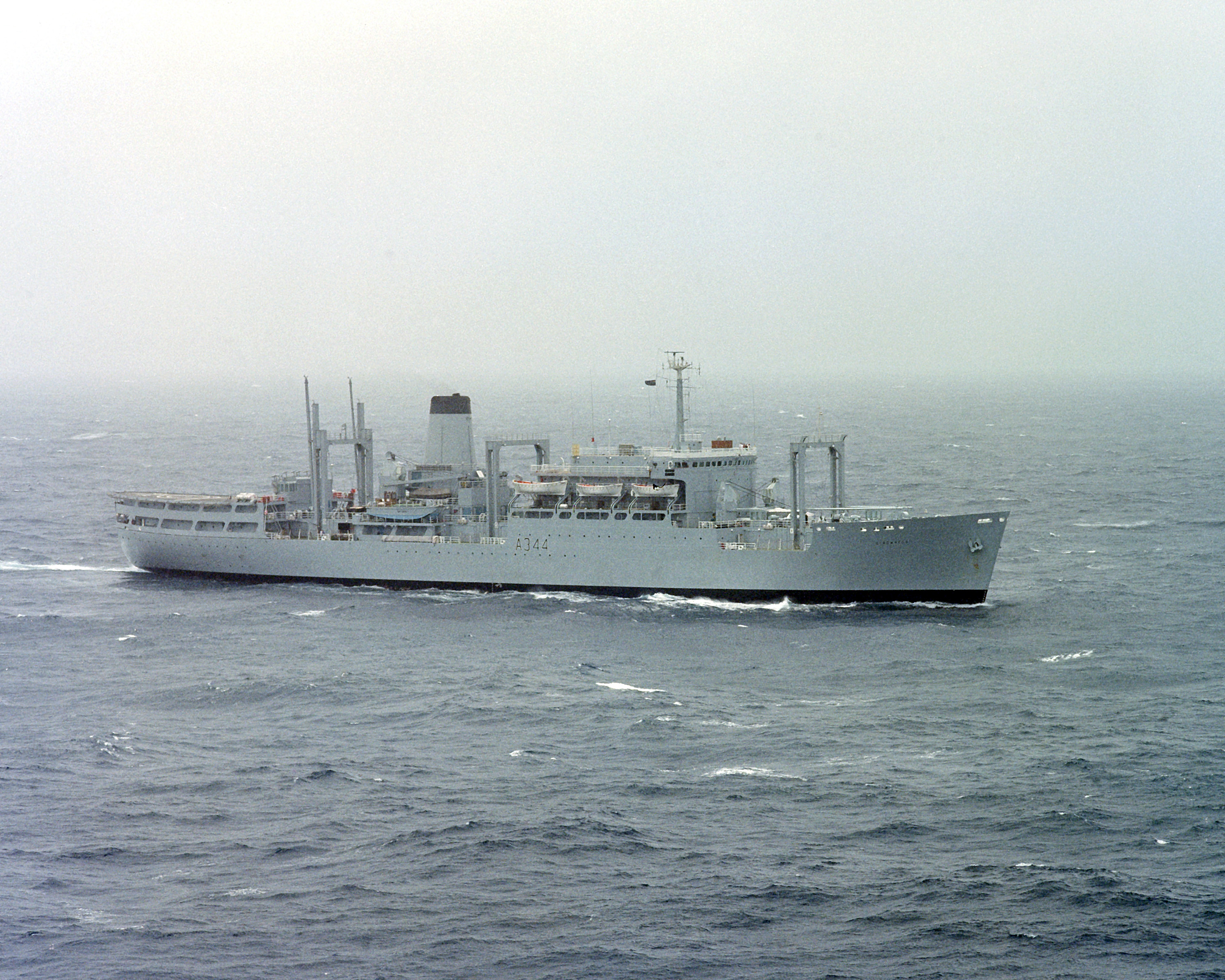
- RFA Stromness (A344) underway in the North Atlantic c. 1982

History

United Kingdom
- Name: RFA Stromness
- Namesake: Stromness, Orkney, Scotland
- Ordered: 7 December 1964
- Builder: Swan Hunter
- Yard number: 2017
- Laid down: 5 October 1965
- Launched: 16 September 1966
- Fate: Sold to US Navy

United States
- Name: USNS Saturn
- Acquired: 1 January 1983
- In service: 1 January 1983
- Out of service: 6 April 2009
- Identification: IMO number: 6709787; Callsign: NADH
- Fate: Sunk 27 October 2010

General characteristics
- Class & type: RFA: Ness-class fleet stores ship; USN: Sirius-class combat stores ship
- Tonnage: 6475 deadweight tonnage; 14,660 GT
- Displacement: 10,205 tons
- Length: 523 ft (159 m) o/a
- Beam: 72 ft (22 m)
- Draft: 26 ft (7.9 m) (max.)
- Propulsion: 8-cylinder Sulzer RD 76 turbocharged diesel engine, 11,520 bhp (8,590 kW) at 118 RPM, single propeller
- Speed: 18 knots (33 km/h)
- Complement: RFA: 110 RFA + 50 Stores Working Party; USN: 123 Civilian, 47 Navy
- Armament: 6x pintle mounts for M240B 7.62mm machine guns or Browning M2 12.7mm machine guns in MSC service. Guns not normally fitted
- Aircraft carried: 2 × UH-46 Sea Knight or MH-60S Seahawk helicopters
- Aviation facilities: Fitted with a flight deck but no hangar facilities until purchased by U.S. Military Sealift Command, hangar for 2 CH-46, MH-60 or Super Puma post-refit

RFA Stromness (A344) was a fleet stores ship which served the Royal Fleet Auxiliary until sold to the U.S. Navy's Military Sealift Command in 1983. While in the service of British forces, it saw service in the Falklands War. After the sale to the United States, it was renamed USNS Saturn (T-AFS-10) and acted as a combat stores ship until it was deactivated in 2009; it was able to supply two other ships at once. In 2010, it was sunk in an exercise by the U.S. Carrier Strike Group Two off the coast of North Carolina.

== Construction ==
Originally known as RFA Stromness (A344), the vessel was built at Swan Hunter & Wigham Richardson Ltd, Wallsend as Yard Nr 2017, United Kingdom, for the Royal Navy. She was laid down on 5 October 1965 and launched on 16 September 1966.

== RFA operational history ==
In 1973 she brought the expedition members of the Joint Services Egmont Islands Expedition (JSEI) from the Egmont Atoll back to Gan, Addu Atoll after their mission was over. Led by Sqn Leader "Dickie" Bird RAF, it was the first scuba diving expedition in the Chagos Archipelago. Following its success, a second expedition was undertaken to Danger Island the following year.

In 1982, Stromness saw service during the Falklands War, where she carried over 400 troops of 45 Commando Royal Marines to the beach landing in San Carlos Water.

== Sale to the U.S. Navy ==
In 1983 Stromness was sold to the United States Navy. She was placed into non-commissioned service with Military Sealift Command and renamed USNS Saturn (T-AFS-10).

== Military Sealift Command Mission ==
Saturn was one of five combat stores ships operated by Military Sealift Command. She provided fuel, food, ammunition and ocean towing services to U.S. Navy ships around the world. Saturn carried virtually every type of food and supply needed by Navy ships. Saturn carried spare and repair parts for other ships and aircraft and also had a limited capability to transfer fuel to other Navy ships at sea. Supplies and fuel are transferred to other ships using lines and hoses suspended above the water to another ship as the ships move forward at the same speed and sometimes less than 50 feet apart.

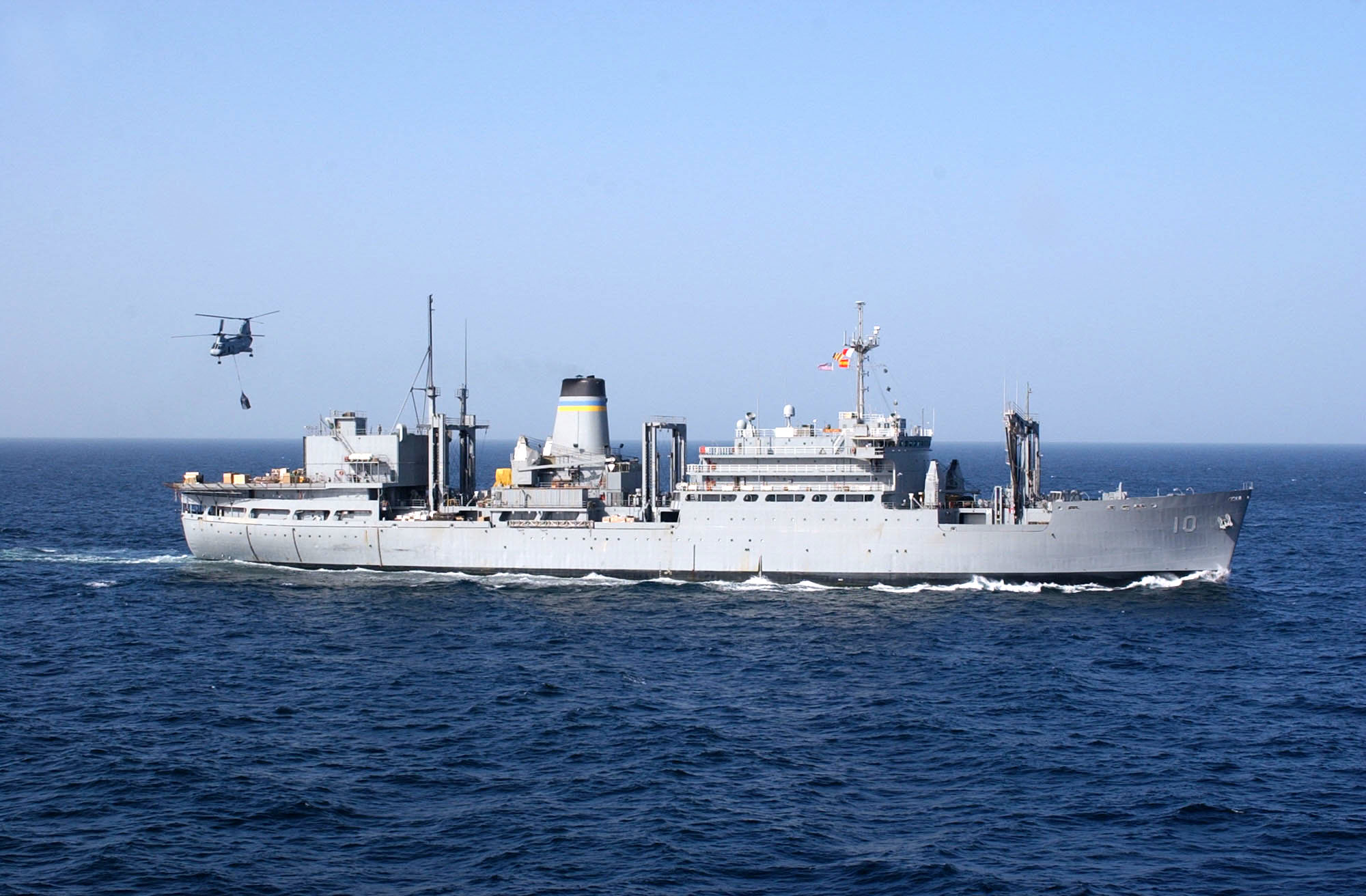
USNS Saturn (T-AFS-10)

Saturn was capable of replenishing two ships at the same time, one on either side, using this side-by-side technique. Dry stores were also transferred by using helicopters to lift large cargo nets and pallets loaded with supplies and parts. Saturn had elevators and mobile equipment for handling stores internally on the ship. Helicopters were not assigned to Saturn on a full-time basis, but flew aboard for extended periods of time while the ship was at sea.

Civilian Mariners (CIVMARS) on board USNS Saturn were a vital part of the Military Sealift Command (MSC) Fleet. Their areas of expertise encompass a wide variety of occupations ranging primarily from the engineering, deck and supply departments. Final complement was approximately 120 personnel. Tour lengths were 4 months in duration with an extension option available.

Enlisted ratings on board included Operations Specialists, Information Systems Technicians, Electronics Technicians, Personnelmen and Storekeepers. Final tour length for enlisted military members aboard Saturn was 12 months. Officers served up to a two-year tour.

== Saturn operational history ==
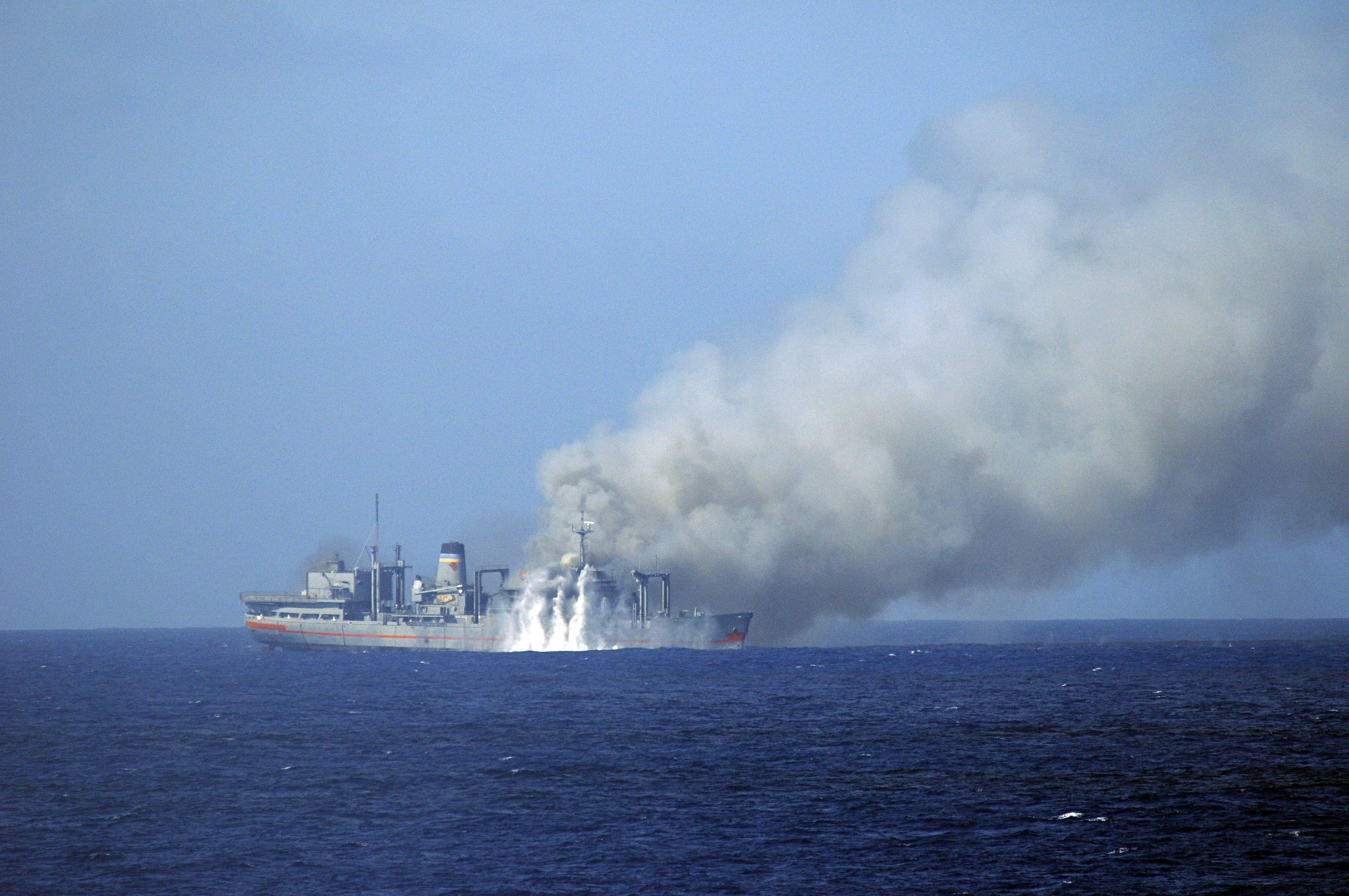
20mm rounds from a Phalanx CIWS hitting Saturn during the sinking exercise in 2010.

The Saturn was deactivated on 6 April 2009 and sunk as a target ship for weapons in a sinking exercise (SINKEX) by ships and aircraft of the George H.W. Bush Carrier Strike Group off the coast of North Carolina on 27 October 2010.
