= Eliane Brum =

Brazilian journalist

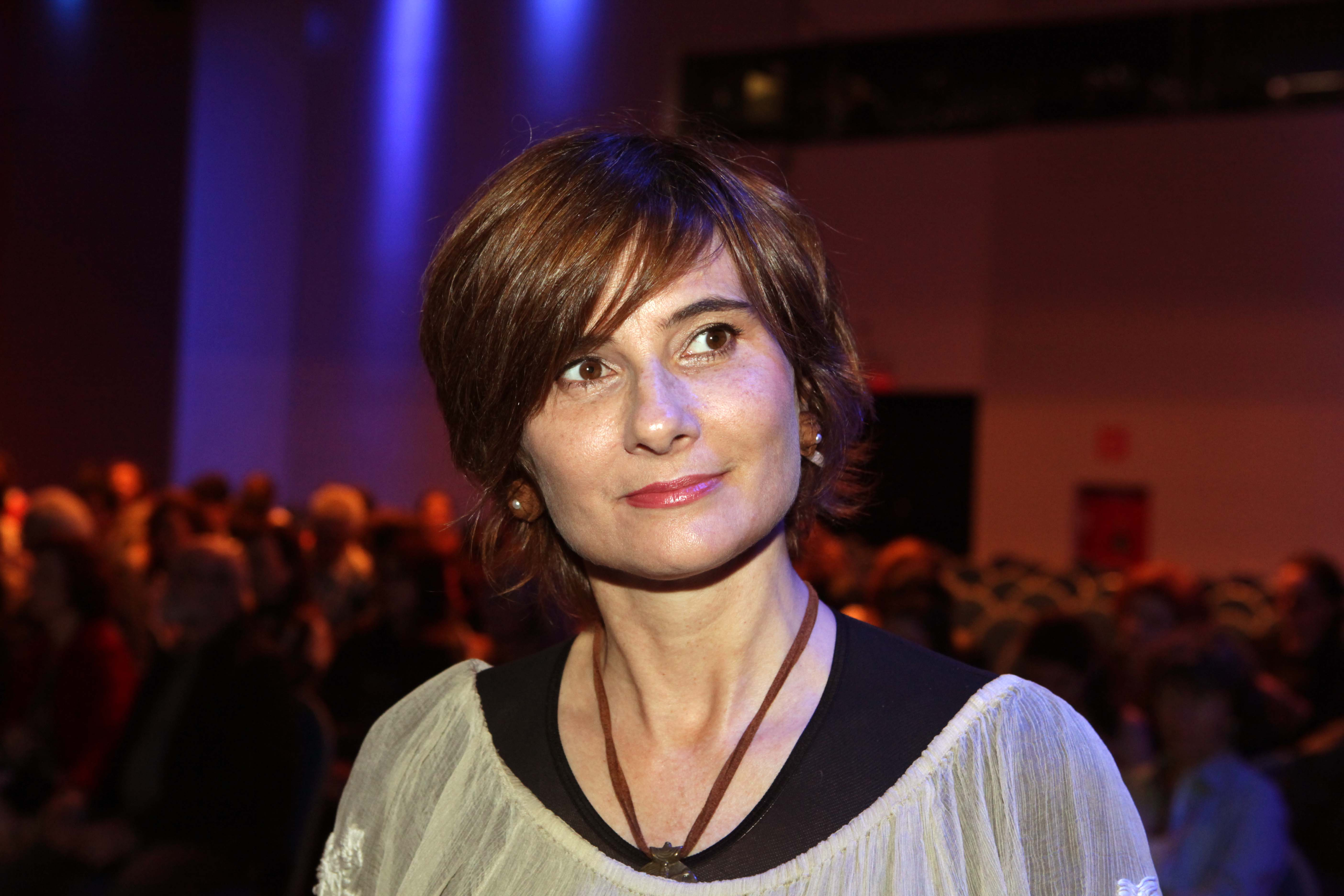
- Born: May 23, 1966 (age 60); Ijuí, Rio Grande do Sul, Brazil
- Education: Pontifical Catholic University of Rio Grande do Sul
- Occupations: Journalist, writer and documentary filmmaker
- Spouse: Jonathan Watts
- Writing career
- Years active: 1988–present
- Notable awards: Açorianos Award (1994); Jabuti Award (2007)

Eliane Brum (born May 1966, in Ijuí) is a Brazilian journalist, writer and documentarist. In 2019, she was long-listed for a National Book Award.

== Life ==
She graduated from the Pontifical Catholic University of Rio Grande do Sul (PUC / RS) in 1988 and has written for Zero Hora, Época and El País and won more than 40 international awards for reporting, among them the Premio Rey de España and the Inter American Associated Press Award.

Brum is the author of a novel - Uma Duas (published in English by AmazonCrossing as One Two - three feature news stories books: Coluna Prestes - O Avesso da Lenda, A Vida que Ninguém Vê (which was awarded in 2007 the Prêmio Jabuti) and O Olho da Rua - and A Menina Quebrada, a collection of columns written by her in Época magazine's website.

She also codirected and cowrote the 2005 documentary film Uma história severina (Severina's Story), winner of seventeen national and international awards.

In 2008 she received the United Nations Special Press Trophy.

Her work appeared in The Guardian. and El Pais.

She participated in the Doctors without Borders compilation of special reports Dignity, which also included authors such as Mario Vargas Llosa. She is co-director of three documentaries: Severina's Story, Gretchen Filme Estrada, and Laerte-se.

She is married to British journalist Jonathan Watts.

== Works ==
=== Literature ===
- 1994 - Coluna Prestes – O Avesso da Lenda (Arts & Crafts)
- 2006 - The Life Nobody Sees (Arquipélago Editorial)
- 2008 - Olho da Rua – a reporter in search of real-life literature (Editora Globo)
- 2011 - Uma Duas (LeYa)
- 2013 - The Broken Girl (Arquipélago Editorial)
- 2014 - My disappointments – The story of my life with words (Arquipélago Editorial)
- 2019 - Brazil, builder of ruins (Arquipélago Editorial)
- 2019 - The Collector of Leftover Souls: Field Notes on Brazil's Everyday Insurrections (Graywolf)
- 2021 - Banzeiro òkòtó: A trip to the Amazon Center of the World (Companhia das Letras)

=== Filmography ===
(Director, Screenwriter)

- 2005 - Uma História Severina (co-directed with Debora Diniz)
- 2010 - Gretchen Filme Estrada (codireção em parceria com Paschoal Samora)
- 2017 - Laerte-se (codireção em parceria com Lygia Barbosa da Silva)
- 2017 - Eu+1: Uma jornada de saúde mental na Amazônia
