= Uma Ramakrishnan =

Indian molecular ecologist

- Education: PhD, University of California, San Diego Postdoc, Stanford University
- Occupation: Professor
- Awards: Parker-Gentry Award
- Website: https://www.ncbs.res.in/faculty/uma-research

Uma Ramakrishnan is an Indian molecular ecologist and professor at National Centre for Biological Sciences (NCBS), Bangalore. Her research investigates population genetics and evolutionary history of mammals in the Indian subcontinent, including work to save India's tigers. In July 2019, she was elected as a fellow to the Indian National Science Academy.

== Early life and education ==
Ramakrishnan grew up in the campuses of BHU, Varanasi and IISc, Bangalore. Ramakrishnan did a Bachelor of Science in Physics, Chemistry and Mathematics and a Master's in biotechnology. She subsequently received a PhD from the University of California, San Diego, following which she was a postdoc at Stanford University.

== Research and career ==
Ramakrishnan joined NCBS in 2005 as an assistant professor. Her lab developed methods to conduct population monitoring and landscape/population genetics with tiger fecal samples. Her previous projects include work on contrasting population structure between commensal and wild rodents, and understanding drivers of diversification in montane bird communities in the Western Ghats. Ramakrishnan has worked with the tiger expert and former director of Wildlife Conservation Society- India, K. Ullas Karanth. Together with Karanth, Ramakrishnan's lab used genetic sampling to estimate the tiger population in Bandipur National Park. Her research on the connectivity of tiger populations in Central India was presented in court to stay the widening of NH7 which cuts across the Kanha-Pench corridor.

With the advent of next-generation sequencing technologies, Ramakrishnan has pioneered studies investigating genomics of wild populations of several species to study population genetics, disease ecology and lanscape connectivity. Her group has studied rodents, bats, several tiger populations, fish and small cats contributing to research and policy decisions of a wide range of taxa. In 2016 she was on sabbatical at Stanford University as International Core Faculty, Program in Conservation Genomics.

Ramakrishnan has mentored many student researchers in the course of her career and built the genomics community in India for which she was recognised with the Homi Bhabha Award for Science Education in 2020. Her research has been supported by two DBT Wellcome Trust India Alliance Senior Investigator Awards as well as through Panthera , National Geographic Society and other funding bodies.

== Publications ==
- Merging paleobiology with conservation biology to guide the future of terrestrial ecosystems, Science
- History of Click-Speaking Populations of Africa Inferred from mtDNA and Y Chromosome Genetic Variation, Molecular Biology and Evolution,
- Protected areas and biodiversity conservation in India, Biological Conservation,
- Conservation priorities for endangered Indian tigers through a genomic lens, Scientific Reports
- Rapid multiplex PCR based species identification of wild tigers using non-invasive samples, Conservation Genetics.
- Commensalism facilitates gene flow in mountains: a comparison between two Rattus species Commensalism facilitates gene flow in mountains: a comparison between two Rattus species
- Identifying species, sex and individual tigers and leopards in the Malenad-Mysore Tiger Landscape, Western Ghats, India - Mondol, S., Kumar, N.S., Gopalaswamy, A. et al. Conservation Genet Resour (2015) 7: 353. doi:10.1007/s12686-014-0371-9 Identifying species, sex and individual tigers and leopards in the Malenad-Mysore Tiger Landscape, Western Ghats, India
- Reassessment of the distribution and threat status of the Western Ghats endemic bird, Nilgiri Pipit Anthus nilghiriensis - V. V. Robin*,†, C. K. Vishnudas* and Uma Ramakrishnan

== Awards and honours ==
- Elected International Honorary Member, AAA&S(2024)
- Obaid Siddiqui award, Sastra University (2024)
- Molecular Ecology Prize (2024), Molecular Ecology Journal.
- Ramanujan Fellowship, Department of Science and Technology, Government of India (2010)
- Parker/Gentry Award by Field Museum, Chicago
- Senior Research Visiting Fellow, Department of Biological Sciences, National University of Singapore (2011)
- Outstanding Scientist Award, Department of Atomic Energy (2012)
- Fellow, Indian National Science Academy (INSA)
