= Great Chagos Bank =

Island group in the Indian Ocean

Coordinates: 6°10′S 72°00′E

Location of the Great Chagos Bank in the Indian Ocean

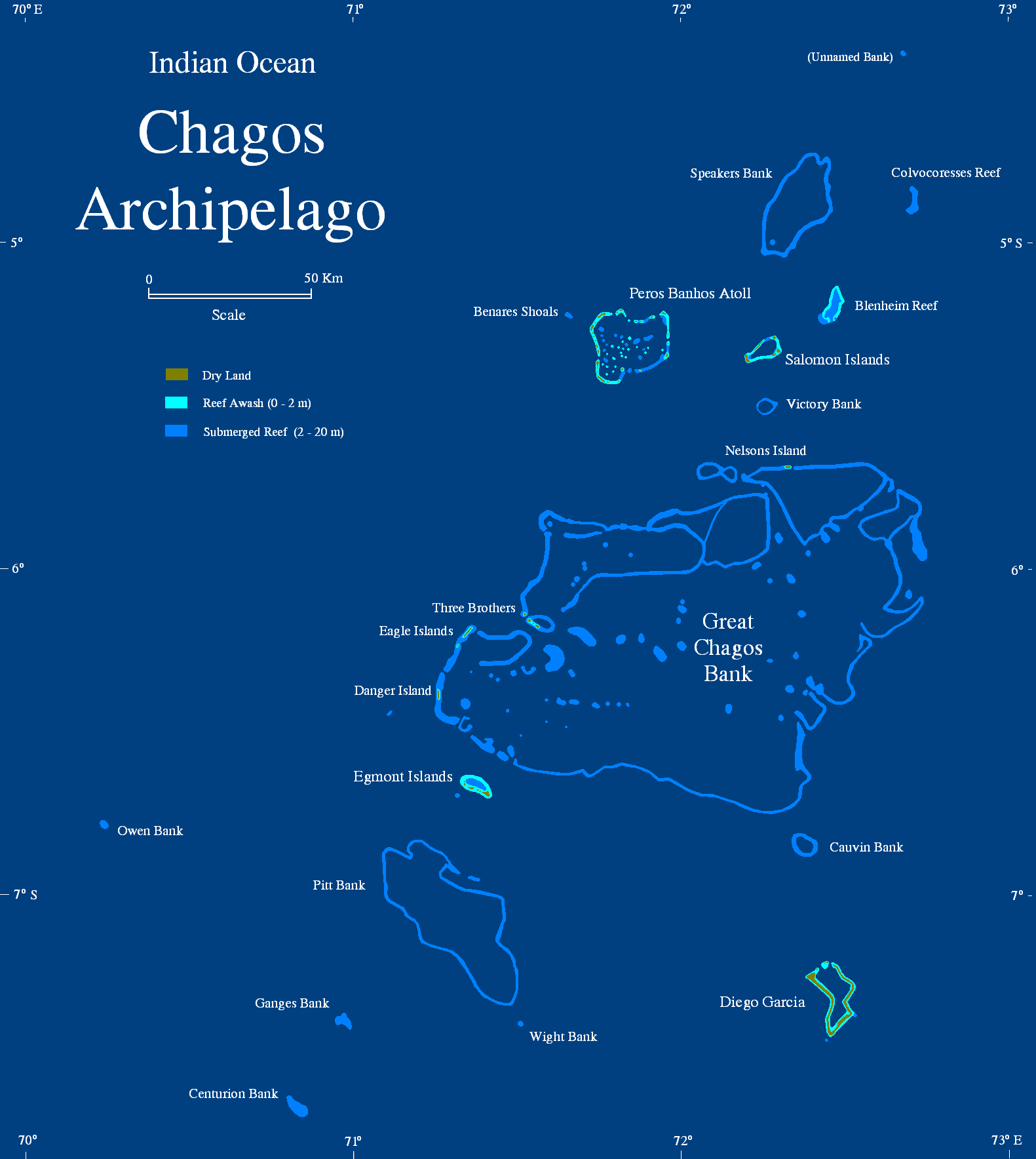
The great Chagos bank is in the middle of the Chagos archipelago (click the image for a more detailed view of the Map)

The Great Chagos Bank, in the Chagos Archipelago, about 500 km (310 mi) south of Maldives, is the largest atoll structure in the world, with a total area of 12,642 km^{2} (4,881 sq mi).

== Islands ==
Despite its enormous size, the Great Chagos Bank is largely a submarine structure. There are only four emerging reefs, mostly located on the western rim of the atoll, except for lonely Nelson Island, which lies wholly isolated in the middle of the northern fringe. These reefs have eight individual low and sandy islands, with a total land area of about 5.6 km^{2} (2.2 sq mi). All islands and their surrounding waters are a Strict Nature Reserve since 1998. The total length of the eastern and southern expanses of the bank, as well as the reefs in its central area, are wholly submerged.

The islands of the Great Chagos Bank, starting clockwise from the south, are:

- Danger Island (slightly more than 2 km (1.2 mi) long from North to South, by 1 km (0.62 mi) wide, land area 0.66 km^{2} (0.25 sq mi), vegetated with palm trees up to 12 m (39 ft) high.
- Eagle Islands
  - Île Aigle (Eagle Island, vegetated with high coconut trees, land area 2.45 km^{2} (0.95 sq mi)
  - Sea Cow Island (Île Vache Marine), vegetated with trees, land area 18 hectares (44 acres).
- Three Brothers (Trois Frères) and Resurgent Islands, vegetated with high coconut trees, land area 0.4 km^{2} (0.15 sq mi).
  - Île du Sud (South Island, largest of the group), 23 ha (57 acres)
  - Île du Milieu (Middle Island), 8 ha (20 acres)
  - Resurgent Island (unvegetated), 1 ha (2.5 acres)
  - Île du Nord (North Island), 6 ha (15 acres)
- Nelson Island (2 km (1.2 mi) long from East to West, up to 0.41 km (0.25 mi) wide, land area 0.4 km^{2} (0.15 sq mi), with 3 m (9.8 ft) high, bushy vegetation.

== Cartography of the submerged reefs ==
The Great Chagos Bank was surveyed for the first time by Commander Robert Moresby of the Royal Indian Navy in 1837; all other maps that would be drawn for over a century and a half were based on his chart. Although the charts of atolls made up of mostly emerged reefs, like Peros Banhos and Diego Garcia, were relatively accurate, the cartography of the vast sunken reefs forming the Great Chagos Bank proved quite a challenge. The real shape of these sunken reefs was known only when satellite imagery became available in the latter part of the 20th century.

Moresby's original hydrographic drawings were somewhat at variance with the true shape of the submerged reef, especially in areas where there were no emerging islands close by, like in the South east of the bank. The outlines of the first hydrographic surveys were marked in the 1980s navigational maps of the Chagos with a dotted line and the legend "existence doubtful" until the 1998 edition.

== See also ==
- Chagos Archipelago
- Chagos Marine Protected Area
- Diego Garcia
- Victory Bank
