= Merlijn van Weerd =

Dutch biologist (born 1970)

- Born: 10 June 1970
- Education: University of Groningen
- Known for: Conservation of the Philippine crocodile; founding of Mabuwaya Foundation
- Awards: Parker-Gentry Award (2015)
- Scientific career
- Fields: Ecology, Conservation biology
- Workplaces: Leiden University

Merlijn van Weerd (born 10 June 1970) is a Dutch wildlife biologist and conservationist, known for his extensive work in the Philippines on the conservation of the critically endangered Philippine crocodile (Crocodylus mindorensis). He is a lecturer at Leiden University and founder of the Mabuwaya Foundation, a biodiversity conservation organization in the Philippines.

== Biography ==
=== Education and early career ===
Van Weerd graduated in 1996 from the University of Groningen with a MSc (Drs.) degree in biology, specializing in animal ecology. During his studies he conducted ecological research on Schiermonnikoog, studied shorebirds in Mozambique and carried out fieldwork in Cameroon on the impact of floodplain restoration on water bird populations.

After graduation he continued fieldwork on Schiermonnikoog and later worked as an ecologist for the Institute of Environmental Science (CML) at Leiden University on the Waza-Logone project in Cameroon. From 1999 to 2003 he was employed by the Dutch Ministry of Foreign Affairs as a wildlife biologist at the Northern Sierra Madre Natural Park Conservation Project in Luzon, Philippines.

=== Work in the Philippines ===
In 2003 Van Weerd founded the Mabuwaya Foundation, a Philippine non-profit organization focused on the protection of the Philippine crocodile by engaging with local communities. The foundation collaborates with local residents, including the Agta people, to monitor habitats, rear hatchlings, and implement conservation programs.

His efforts have contributed to increasing the wild population of the Philippine crocodile, once thought nearly extinct, from around 20 individuals two decades ago to about 80 by 2022. In collaboration with local authorities, he has set up a protection program in the province of Isabela.

Van Weerd and his colleagues have also been involved in the discovery of the fruit-eating monitor lizard (Varanus bitatawa) and in establishing the Northern Sierra Madre Natural Park in northern Luzon.

=== Academic career ===
Since 2003 Van Weerd has been affiliated with Leiden University as a researcher and lecturer on biodiversity and sustainability. From 2007 to 2010 he coordinated the CML field station in the Philippines, and since 2010 he has also taught in the Department of Anthropology and Development Sociology, co-organizing the joint CML/CA-DS annual field course on sustainability in the Philippines.

He is a member of the IUCN Species Survival Commission (Crocodile Specialist Group and Monitor Lizard Specialist Group) and the IUCN Commission on Education and Communication.

== Awards ==
In 2015, Van Weerd received the Parker-Gentry Award from the Field Museum of Natural History in Chicago in recognition of his commitment to biodiversity conservation and his work to protect the Philippine crocodile.

== Research interests ==
Van Weerd’s research includes biodiversity in tropical forest ecosystems, the impact of deforestation and climate change, local management of natural resources, and conservation of endangered species such as the Philippine crocodile.
