= Mabuwaya =

Mabuwaya Foundation
- Founder: Merlijn van Weerd, Jan van der Ploeg
- Headquarters: CCVPED building, Isabela State University Cabagan, Isabela North Luzon
- Key people: Merlijn van Weerd, Tess Gatan-Balbas
- Website: www.mabuwaya.org

Mabuwaya is a contraction of the Filipino words mabuhay, "welcome" or "long live," and buwaya, "crocodile."

The Mabuwaya Foundation is an NGO in the Philippines, established in 2003, that is concerned with the conservation of the Philippine crocodile. Currently, its efforts concentrate on educating the people of Luzon, one of the islands of the Philippines where the animal is still found in the wild. Mabuwaya teaches that the crocodile is something of which to be proud, and how unsustainable fishing methods threaten both the animal and its environment.

Mabuwaya actively working in the municipalities of San Mariano and Divilacan to conserve the remnant wild populations of the Philippine crocodile that survive here in the wild in the Northern Sierra madre Natural Park and its periphery in northern Luzon.

== Conservation approach ==
The Philippine crocodile is the most threatened species of crocodile on the planet. The foundation has a community-based conservation approach aimed at raising awareness about the Philippine crocodile and local acceptance and participation in crocodile conservation. The conservation program consists of five main components: 1) Communication, Education and Public Awareness (CEPA) Campaigns 2) Research, 3) Protection, 4) Capacity Building, 5) Philippine crocodile population re-enforcement and recovery.

=== Communication, education and public awareness campaigns ===
Through cultural shows and community dialogue, school visits, field days with secondary school students and distribution of posters, storybooks, calendars and manuals the people who live in close contact with the crocodiles are educated about the importance of conservation and wetland management.

=== Research ===
Three main research activities are carried out. The head start research, telemetry research and quarterly monitoring are all carried out. These research are essential for the design of local conservation plans and efforts.

=== Philippine crocodile population re-enforcement and recovery ===
The rearing station in barangay Minanga, San Marino plays an essential roll in the crocodile conservation. At the station hatchlings are protected until they have are big enough to be released into the wild. Since the start of the program the numbers of Philippine crocodiles in the wild have been rising. The CROC program was set up to combine the importance of education with the conservation of the Philippine crocodile.

== Funding and awards ==
=== Funding ===
The Mabuwaya foundation was able to start its important work in 2003 because of a grant the organization received from the conservation leadership programme.

In 2007 a grant from CEPF helped finance a research done by the Mabuwaya team: 'With support from the Critical Ecosystem Partnership Fund (CEPF), the Mabuwaya Foundation worked with communities to develop a conservation program to change opinions about crocodiles and bring the species back from the brink of extinction'.

Mabuwaya also works closely with the Taronga Conservation Society and the Victoria Zoo, both in Australia. The Phoenix Zoo, USA and many private donors.

=== Awards ===
In August 2014 Tess Gatan-Balbas received the Whitley award. This award recognizes the important work Tess and the Mabuwaya team are doing to protect the world's most endangered crocodile.

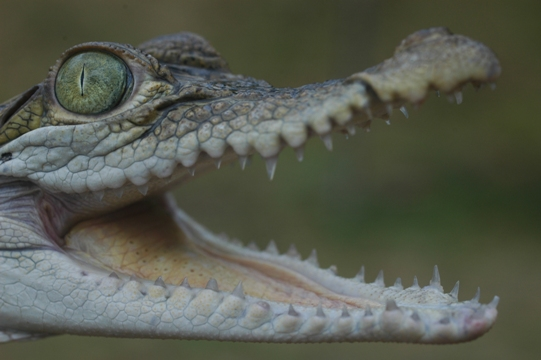
Vanderploeg (2007) juvenile Philippine crocodile
