= Jonathan Watts =

British journalist

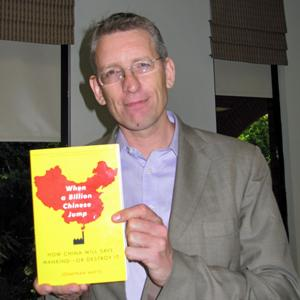
- Watts in 2010 with his book When a Billion Chinese Jump
- Occupation: Journalist
- Language: English
- Citizenship: United Kingdom
- Subject: Environmentalism
- Employer: The Guardian
- Notable awards: SEAL Awards for Environmental Journalism (2018, 2019)
- Spouse: Eliane Brum

Jonathan Watts is a British journalist and the author of When a Billion Chinese Jump: How China Will Save the World - or Destroy It and "The Many Lives of James Lovelock". He served as president of the Foreign Correspondents' Club of China from 2008 to 2009 and as vice president of the Foreign Correspondents' Club of Japan from 2001 to 2003. He is married to Brazilian journalist Eliane Brum.

Since 1996, he has reported on East Asia for The Guardian, covering the North Korean nuclear crisis, the Indian Ocean tsunami in 2004, the Sichuan earthquake, the Beijing Olympics, the Copenhagen climate conference, and developments in China's media, society and environment.

In 2012 Watts covered Rio+20 for The Guardian, and as of 2025 is their Global Environment Editor.

In 2018 and 2019, Watts was selected as a winner of the SEAL Environmental Journalism Award.
