= Rhett Ayers Butler =

American writer and businessman (born 1978)

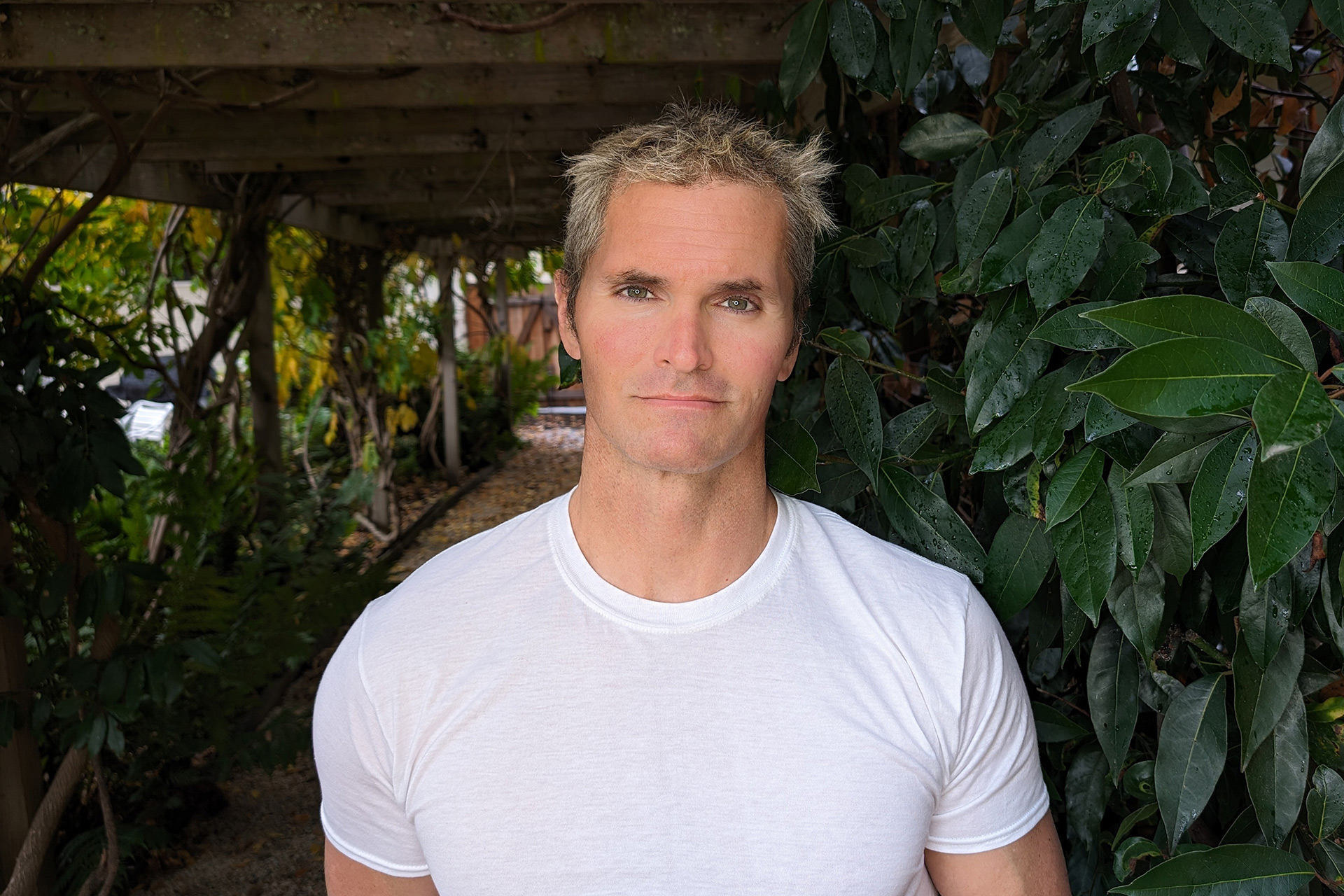
- Butler in 2023
- Born: 1978 (age 47–48); United States
- Education: University of California, San Diego (BSc)
- Organisation: Mongabay
- Known for: Conservation science, Environmental journalism
- Awards: Parker-Gentry Award, Heinz Award

Rhett Ayers Butler (born 1978) is an American journalist, author and entrepreneur who founded Mongabay, a conservation and environmental science news platform, in 1999.

Butler founded Mongabay out of his interest in nature and wildlife. The name "mongabay" originated from an anglicized spelling and pronunciation of Nosy Mangabe, an island off the coast of Madagascar.

Butler has received multiple conservation, environmental, and journalism awards including the Parker-Gentry Award from the Field Museum of Natural History in 2014, the SEAL Environmental Journalism Award in 2021, the Heinz Award for the Environment in 2022, the Henry Shaw Medal from the Missouri Botanical Garden in 2025, and being named to the Forbes Sustainability Leaders List in 2025.

== Education and career ==
Butler studied Management Science and Economics University of California, San Diego, where he earned a Bachelor of Science degree.

In 1999 Butler founded Mongabayorg Corporation, a nonprofit 501(c)(3) charitable organization headquartered in Menlo Park, California that raises awareness about social and environmental issues relating to forests and other ecosystems. Mongabay.org was established in 2012 as the non-profit arm of Mongabay and its first project with Mongabay-Indonesia, an Indonesian-language environmental news service. Butler has served as CEO since inception.

== Reporting focus ==
Butler's reporting has focused on environmental issues in the tropics, especially topics related to forests, like biodiversity, conservation, and deforestation. He's done extensive reporting in Indonesia, Malaysia, Borneo, the Amazon rainforest, and Madagascar.

In 2011 Butler published Rainforests, a book geared toward kids.

== Research ==
Butler has co-authored more than 20 academic papers in publications ranging from Science to Trends in Ecology & Evolution. These papers have usually focused on trends in deforestation and tropical forest conservation, public interest in conservation, conservation practice, palm oil, and conservation technology.

== Philip Jacobson arrest ==
Butler played a prominent role in the effort to free American journalist Philip Jacobson after his detention in Indonesia on 17 December 2019 on an alleged visa violation. Jacobson was released without charge on 31 January 2020.

== Awards ==
- Parker-Gentry Award from the Field Museum of Natural History
- SEAL Environmental Journalism Award, 2021
- 27th Annual Heinz Award for the Environment, 2022
- Henry Shaw Medal from the Missouri Botanical Garden, 2025
- Tällberg‑SNF‑Eliasson Global Leadership Prize, 2025
