= Hayley Smith =

Hayley Smith may refer to:

- Hayley Smith (American Dad!), a character in the American animated sitcom American Dad!
- Hayley Smith (artist) (born 1965), American artist
- Hayley Smith (Home and Away), a character in the Australian soap opera Home and Away

== See also ==
- Haley Smith (born 1993), Canadian cyclist
