= Eagle Island, Chagos Archipelago =

British Indian Ocean Territory

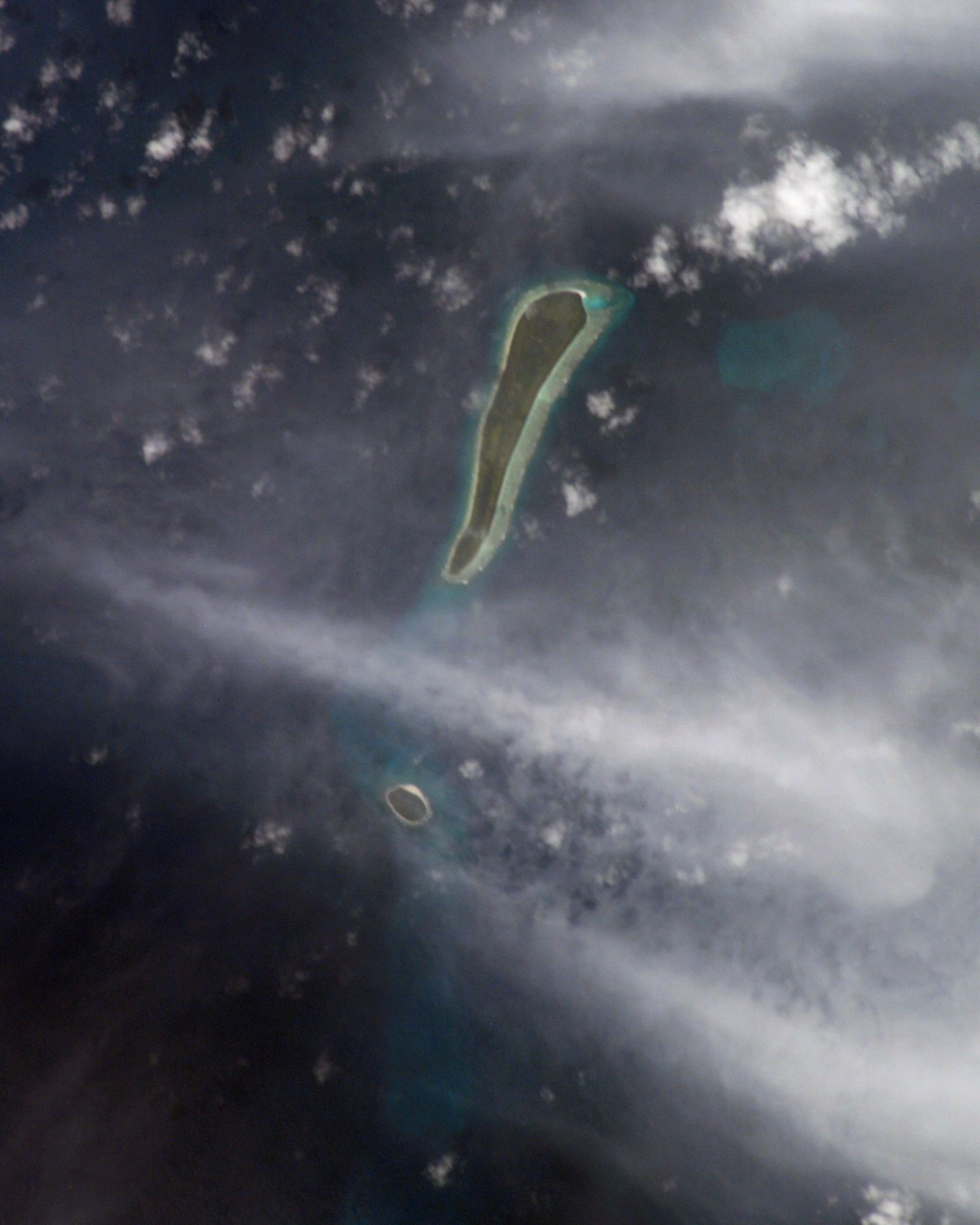
NASA picture of Eagle Island on the north of the image.

Eagle Island, also known as Île Aigle or Île de Aigle, is the second largest island on the Great Chagos Bank atoll of the Chagos Archipelago in the British Indian Ocean Territory. with a land area of 2.45 km^{2}. It is also the largest single island of the Great Chagos Bank.

== History ==
Eagle island was discovered by the Portuguese explorers in the early 16th century along with the rest of the Chagos Archipelago. The French Empire soon colonize the land in the 18th century, naming it Île de l'Aigle after a vessel. (Note: The translation from eagle to French is "Aigle".) Following the Napoleonic Wars, the United Kingdom of Great Britain and Ireland officially acquired the island from France under the Treaty of Paris in 1814, later translating the name to Eagle Island.

In 1998, the island became part of the Chagos Archipelago Strict Nature Reserve, meaning it is forbidden to land on the island or to anchor a boat nearby.
