= The Narwhal =

Canadian environmental magazine

- Editor: Emma Gilchrist
- Country: Canada
- Based in: Victoria, B.C.
- Website: thenarwhal.ca
- ISSN: 0319-0781

The Narwhal is a Canadian investigative online magazine that focuses on environmental issues.

== Organization ==
The Narwhal was launched by Carol Linnitt and Emma Gilchrist in May 2018 as a spin-out of their previous work with DeSmog Canada. It is a not-for-profit organization funded by membership subscriptions and is a member of the Institute for Nonprofit News.

Gilchrist is the Editor-in-Chief/Executive Director; Linnitt is the Executive Editor; Mike De Souza was the Managing Editor (from 2021 to 2025); the Ontario Bureau Chief is Denise Balkissoon; and Amber Bracken is a regular contracted photojournalist.

== Activities and awards ==
Amber Bracken, on assignment for The Narwhal, was arrested alongside CBC commissioned journalist Michael Toledano while reporting on the 2020 Canadian pipeline and railway protests. The Narwhal was noted for their support of Bracken, in the context of her being an independent contractor.

In 2021, The Narwhal journalist Sarah Cox won a Press Freedom Award for her reporting on the Site C hydroelectric project. Despite the small size of the organization, The Narwhal has won many awards.

In 2022, Narwhal journalist Ainslie Cruickshank won a SEAL Environmental Journalism award.

In 2023, The Narwhal and Amber Bracken launched a lawsuit against the Royal Canadian Mounted Police (RCMP) over Bracken's arrest, seeking damages for wrongful arrest, wrongful detention, and violation of rights under the Charter of Rights and Freedoms.

== See also ==
- Institute for Nonprofit News (member)
