= Laerte-se =

2017 documentary film by Lygia Barbosa, Eliane Brum

- Directed by: Lygia Barbosa; Eliane Brum
- Written by: Eliane Brum
- Starring: Laerte Coutinho; Eliane Brum; Rita Lee
- Distributed by: Netflix
- Release date: May 1, 2017
- Running time: 100 minutes
- Country: Brazil
- Language: Portuguese

Laerte-se is a 2017 Brazilian documentary film directed by Lygia Barbosa and Eliane Brum about the Brazilian cartoonist Laerte Coutinho, who at the age of 58 came out as a crossdresser and later as a transgender woman.

== Premise ==
Laerte-se examines gender identity and what it means to be masculine/feminine, while also exploring the issues Learte is facing by introducing herself as a woman and her talents as an artist.

== Cast ==
- Laerte Coutinho
- Eliane Brum
- Rita Lee

== Release ==
The film was released by Netflix on May 1, 2017.
