= Eagle Island State Park =

Eagle Island State Park may refer to:

- Eagle Island State Park (Idaho)
- Eagle Island State Park (Washington)
