= Hayley Smith (artist) =

American wood turning artist

Hayley Smith (born 1965) is an American sculptor. Smith is known for her intricate and detailed wood turning works.

== Early life ==
Smith was born in Cardiff, Wales in 1965. She studied both design and art education in Cardiff. She discovered wood turning by accident when, during her second year of university, she was assigned a woodshop project and the lathe was the only tool not being used.

== Work ==
Her work is included in the collections of the Smithsonian American Art Museum, the Minneapolis Institute of Art, the Yale University Art Gallery the Victoria & Albert Museum, the Center for Art in Wood and the Los Angeles County Museum of Art.
