= Danger Island, Great Chagos Bank =

Island in the Great Chagos Bank

Coordinates: 06°23′00″S 71°14′20″E

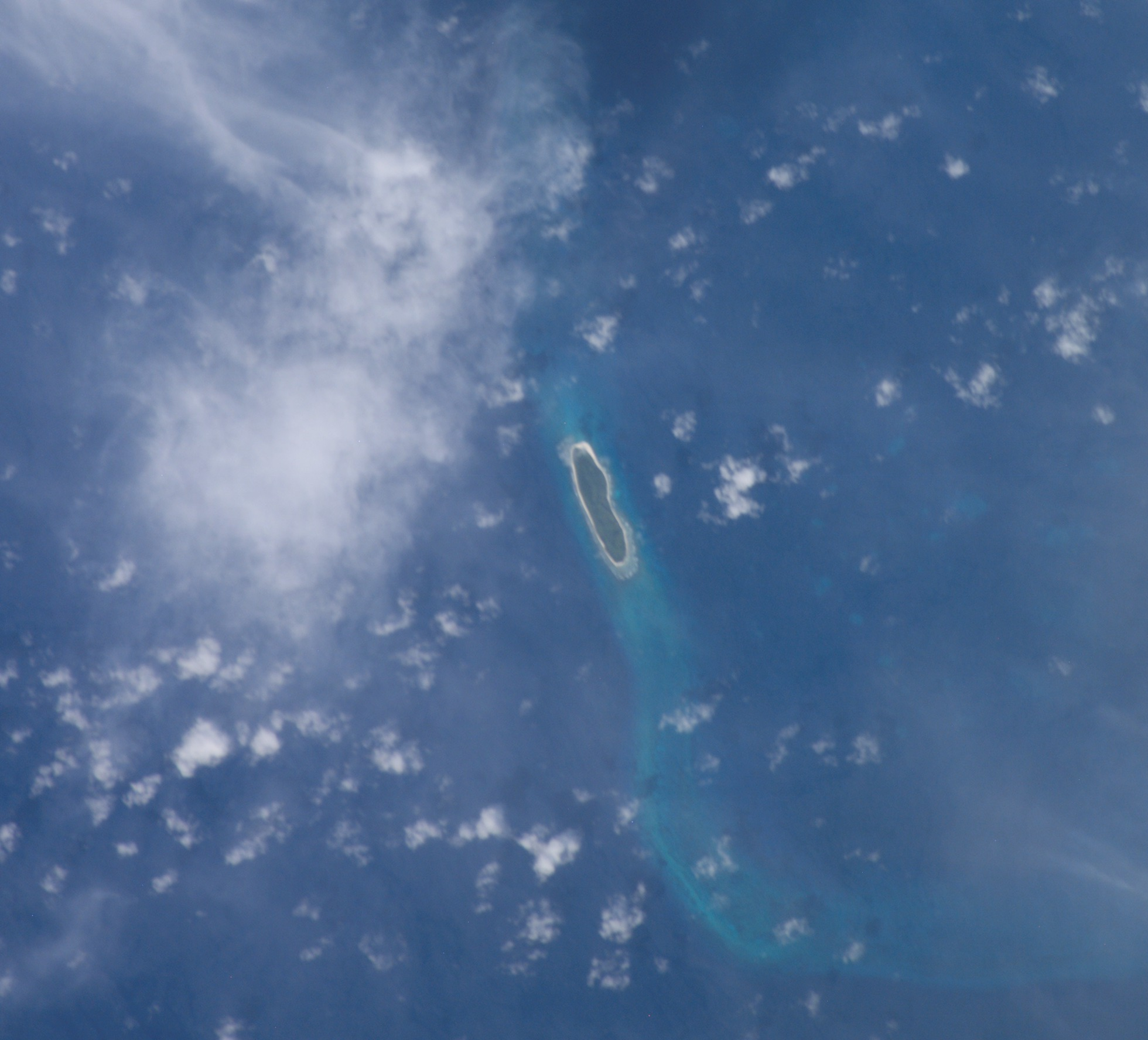
Danger Island on the western rim of the Great Chagos bank

Danger Island is the westernmost and the southernmost island of the Great Chagos Bank, which is the world's largest coral atoll structure. It is located in the Chagos Archipelago in the Indian Ocean.

== Description ==
It is a 2 km (1.24 miles) long flat island with a maximum width of 400 m (1,312 ft), covered with tall coconut trees. Its name probably derives from the dangerous reef that extends about two to three miles south by west of the island, which at times the sea breaks on. The lack of a safe anchorage, which has rendered every visit to this island dangerous for the visiting ship and crew, also makes this name apt. The closest land is Sea Cow Island, the southernmost of the Eagle Islands which lies 16 km (10 mi) to the NNE.

== History ==
Danger Island was sighted by the French ship La Bouffonne in 1777. It was given its name during lieutenant Archibald Blair's 1786 survey of the Chagos archipelago. Blair described the island at the time: "At dawn of day saw Breakers bearing NE, distant about ½ Mile, which I found at daylight to extend from Danger Island [...] It is covered with thick Wood, and a few Coconut Trees near the Centre" [emphasis in original].

There was never a permanent settlement on Danger Island, even at the time that the Chagos were inhabited (between the mid-18th and mid-20th centuries). However, occasionally plantation workers from other islands were brought to this island to collect coconuts.

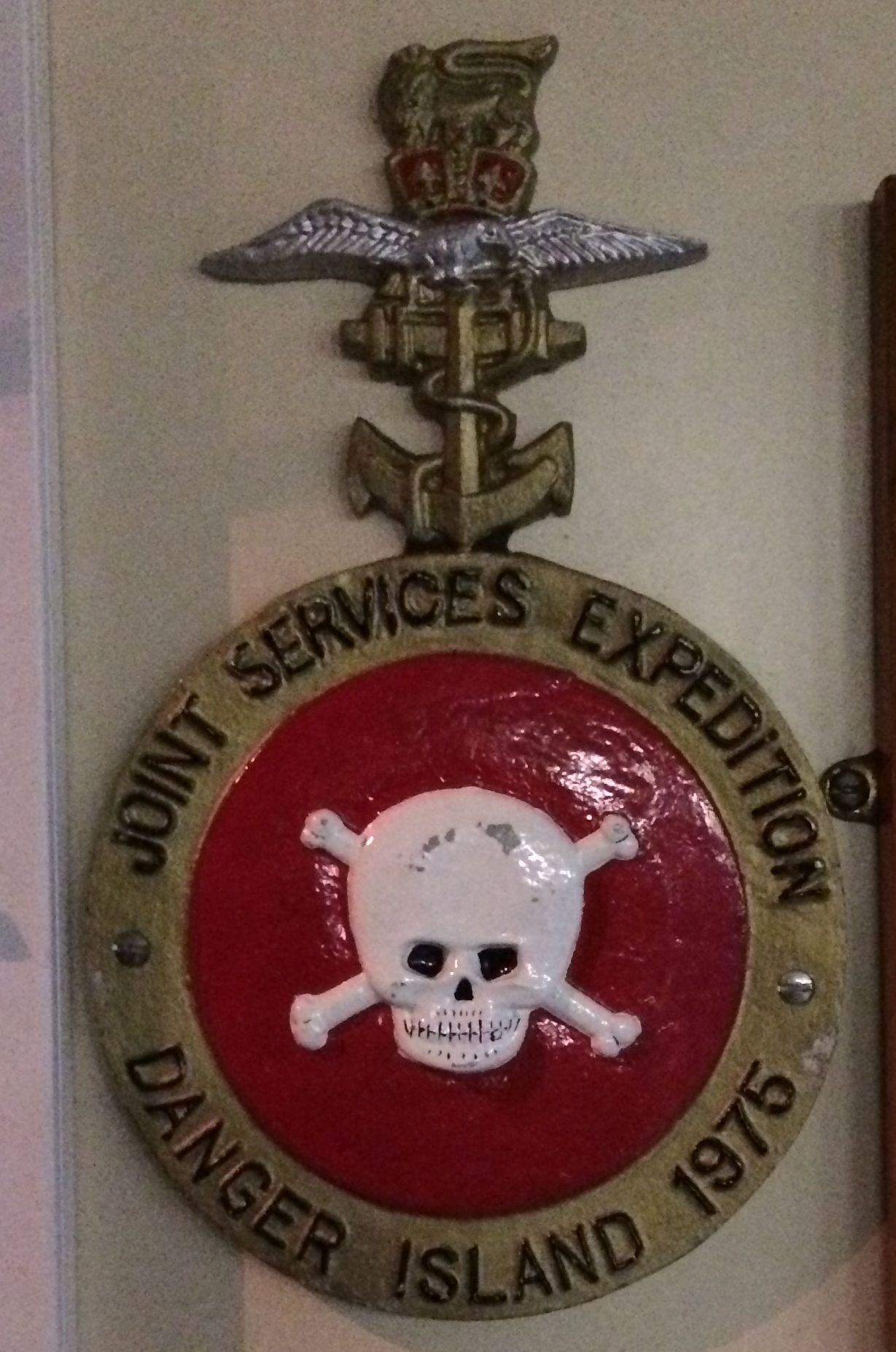
Plaque commemorating the Joint Services 1975 expedition to Danger Island

In 1975, there was an expedition to Danger Island by the Joint Services (JSDI). The expedition members were taken by RFA Resurgent to Eagle Islands and then by ketch and inflatable craft to Danger Island and to Three Brothers. The expedition made a topographical survey of the coral reef, an ecological survey of the corals on it and a study on the metabolism of the reef. A reference collection of samples of the flora and fauna of the area was also undertaken.

Following the Strict Nature Reserves Regulations issued on 18 September 1998, Danger Island, including its territorial waters and the reef surrounding, became a Strict Nature Reserve.

Danger Island has also been identified as an Important Bird Area by BirdLife International. Birds for which the island is of conservation significance include red-footed boobies (3,500 breeding pairs) and brown noddies (11,000 pairs).

The 2012 Chagos Trust expedition landed on the island with some difficulty: it was necessary to swim from an inflatable offshore, and due to the strong undertow, not all were able to land. Those who got ashore reported good tree cover including hardwood trees, especially Pisonia, and a healthy bird community. In the water they explored a shallow bank of seagrass, hoping, but without success, to find dugongs. The 2015 expedition visited the island, landing by the same method but with less difficulty, and reported red-footed and brown Boobys and two species of crab: ghost and sally lightfoot. They also reported turtle tracks and nest, and, in the water, good fish populations and some coral recovery following widespread coral death the previous year.
