= Fiona Harvey =

Environmental journalist (born 1972)

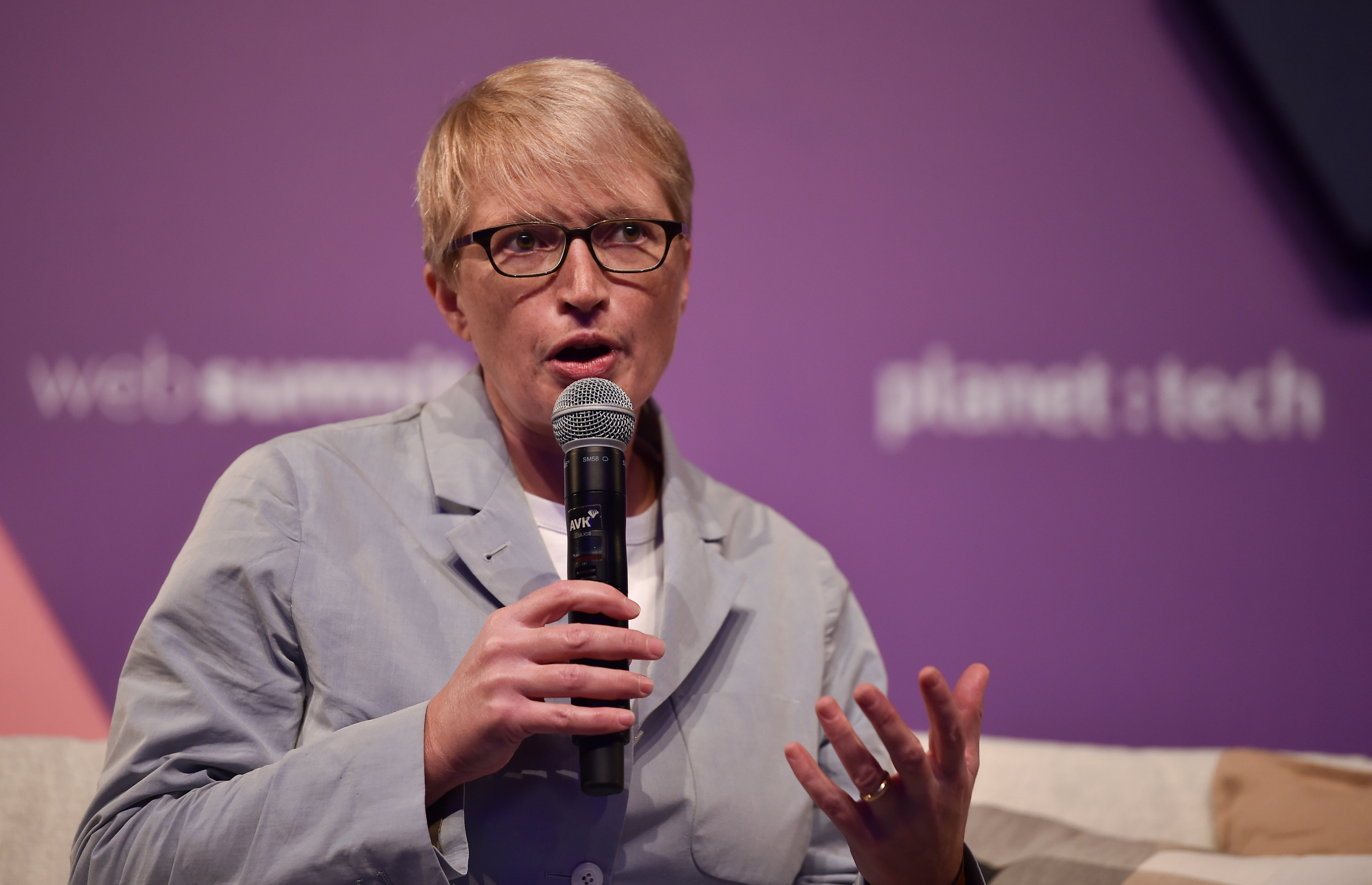
- Harvey in 2018
- Education: Christ's College, Cambridge
- Occupation: Journalist

Fiona Clare Harvey is a British environmental journalist who has spent much of her career writing for The Guardian. She previously worked for a decade at the Financial Times. Harvey has received a number of awards for her journalism.

== Early life and education ==
Harvey graduated with a degree in English literature from Christ's College, Cambridge in 1993.

== Career ==
Harvey began her journalistic work in 1994, as an editor for PC Week, and for some years worked writing and editing in the area of technology news, moving thereafter into work on climate change reporting. Harvey worked for the Financial Times for more than ten years, starting out as an IT and telecoms reporter in 2000. She has also written as a freelancer for Scientific American, the New Scientist, and the Encyclopaedia Britannica.

After that, Harvey began work focused on environmental journalism with the London-based newspaper, The Guardian; in that capacity, she has attended almost every United Nations Climate Change conference since 2004, and interviewed many notable people, including Mikhail Gorbachev, Tony Blair, and Antonio Guterres.

== Awards and recognition ==
Harvey is the recipient of various professional awards, including The Foreign Press Association London award for Environment Story of the Year in 2005 and 2007, and Journalist of the Year at the British Environment and Media Awards in 2007. BBC Woman's Hour named Harvey to the 2020 Power List, a list devoted to UK women with exceptional climate impact.
