= RFA Resurgent =

Royal Fleet Auxiliary ship

History

United Kingdom
- Name: RFA Resurgent
- Builder: Scotts Shipbuilding and Engineering Company, Greenock
- Laid down: 7 June 1949
- Launched: 31 July 1950
- Commissioned: July 1957
- Decommissioned: 18 August 1979
- Identification: IMO number: 5293468; Pennant number: A280
- Fate: Scrapped in Spain in 1981

General characteristics
- Class & type: Retainer class armament stores ship
- Displacement: 14,400 tons
- Length: 477 ft 2 in (145.44 m)
- Beam: 62 ft 2 in (18.95 m)
- Draught: 22 ft 0.75 in (6.72 m)
- Propulsion: 1 x 6 cyl Scott-Doxford diesel
- Speed: 15 knots (28 km/h)
- Aviation facilities: Small landing platform aft; No hangar facilities

RFA Resurgent (A280) was an armament support ship of the Royal Fleet Auxiliary (RFA). Built by Scotts of Greenock as Changchow, a cargo/passenger liner for the China Navigation Co. Made redundant by the Communist victory in 1949, Changchow and her sistership Chungking (later RFA Retainer) were chartered to the French « Messageries Maritimes », for the Marseilles-Sydney line, via Panama. Purchased by the Admiralty and chartered out to British India until 1957. In 1956-1957, under the name Resurgent, she was again chartered to the « Messageries Maritimes », making trips to New Caledonia and Australia. After that, she was converted to an armament store issuing ship and entered RFA service.

In 1975 she took part in the Joint Services Expedition to Danger Island (JSDI). Small, rocky, Resurgent Island, which had emerged after the naming of the Three Brothers in the 18th century, was named after the RFA Resurgent which supported the scuba diving scientific research expedition to the area.

She served until 1979, sailing from Rosyth in tow for demolition in Spain on 5 May 1981.

== See also ==
Fleet Solid Support Ship Programme
