= Ile Vache Marine =

Island in the British Indian Ocean Territory

Coordinates: 06°14′08″S 71°17′40″E

Ile Vache Marine is an island on the southern rim of the Peros Banhos atoll in the Chagos Archipelago of the British Indian Ocean Territory. The island has an area of slightly above 12 ha (30 acres) (Note: According to Harper, Carr & Pitman (2019) the islands area is 12.4 ha (31 acres); according to Benkwitt et al. (2021), it is 14 ha (35 acres).) and an elevation of 2 m (6 ft 7 in).

== History ==
This island was found by the Portuguese explorers in the early 16th century along with the rest of the Chagos Archipelago. The French Empire soon colonized the land in the 18th century. Then, the United Kingdom of Great Britain and Ireland acquired the island from the French Empire in the 19th century through a combination of military conquest and formal diplomacy.

The island has never been inhabited, but up until 1974 plantation workers from Île du Coin would visit it to harvest its coconuts.

== Climate and ecology ==
Sea Cow Island has a tropical rainforest climate (Af ) going by the Köppen climate classification. The mean annual rainfall for the whole Peros Banhos atoll was about 4,000 mm (160 in) between 1950 and 1966, with the precipitation unevenly distributed throughout the year, the austral winter being slightly drier.

The island is part of the Chagos Marine Protected Area, a strict nature reserve covering the vast majority of the British Indian Ocean Territory, (Note: Diego Garcia is excluded due to the presence of Naval Support Facility Diego Garcia.) and has been identified as an Important Bird Area by BirdLife International because of its significance as a breeding site for brown noddies, of which 11,500 pairs were recorded in a 2004 survey.

Black rats, an invasive species, were introduced to the island in the 1700s, most likely by visiting Île du Coin plantation workers; their presence causing serious negative effects for the local birdlife. In August 2014, a team of volunteers from the British Forces stationed on Naval Support Facility Diego Garcia carried out a successful operation to eradicate the black rat populations of Sea Cow Island the Salomon Islands.
