= Carol Linnitt =

Canadian environmental journalist

Carol Linnitt is a Canadian journalist and the co-founder and managing editor of The Narwhal environmental magazine.

== Early life and education ==
Linnit was born in Vancouver.

She has a 2021 PhD in from the University of Victoria that focused on English, and cultural, social and political thought. She won an Emerging Alumni Award from the university in 2022. Prior to her PhD, she obtained a master's degree in English literature from York University and a master's degree in philosophy in the field of phenomenology and environmental ethics.

== Career ==
Linnitt is a journalist and co-founded The Narwhal environmental magazine, where she also works as the managing editor.

She directed the short documentary Coal Valley: The story of B.C.'s quiet water contamination crisis which was shortlisted by the National Media Awards Foundation, for the Best Short Doc prize.

== Personal life ==
Linnitt is married and is from Victoria, British Columbia.

In November 26, 2018 Linnitt was followed by a man, who she later reported to the police, after helping another woman escape his stalking.
