= Mongabay =

Environmental news website

Mongabay Corporation
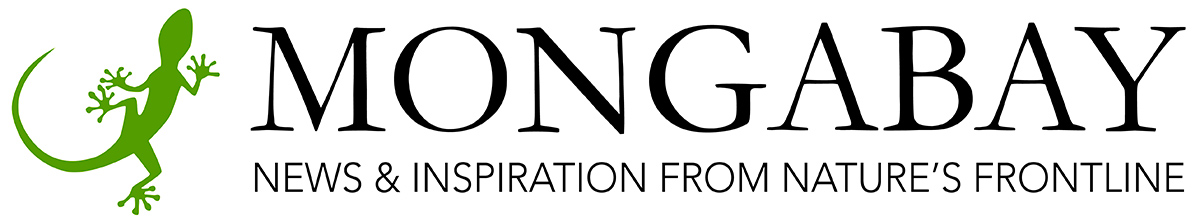
- Founded: 1999
- Founder: Rhett Ayers Butler
- Type: 501(c)(3)
- Tax ID no.: 45-3714703
- Purpose: Conservation journalism
- Location: 1259 El Camino Real #150, Menlo Park, CA, US
- Region served: Global
- Key people: CEO Rhett Ayers Butler
- Affiliations: Institute for Nonprofit News (member)
- Revenue: Donations, grants, and advertising
- Employees: 90 (Sep 2023)
- Website: mongabay.com

Mongabay (mongabay.com) is an American conservation news web portal that reports on environmental science, energy, and green design, and features extensive information on tropical rainforests, including pictures and deforestation statistics for countries of the world.

It was founded in 1999 by economist Rhett Ayers Butler in order to increase "interest in and appreciation of wildlands and wildlife, while examining the impact of emerging local and global trends in technology, economics, and finance on conservation and development". In recent years, to complement its US-based team, Mongabay has opened bureaus in Indonesia, Latin America, and India, reporting daily in Indonesian, Spanish and English respectively. Mongabay's reporting is available in nine languages.

== History ==
In an interview with Conjour, Butler said his passion for rainforests drove him to start Mongabay: "I was intrigued by the complexity of these ecosystems and how every species seemed to play a part. As I became more passionate about rainforests, I grew more concerned about their fate, including the threats they face."

=== Etymology ===
The founder of the website explains that "mongabay" originated from an anglicized spelling and pronunciation of Nosy Mangabe, an island off the coast of Madagascar. He goes on to note that it is best known as "a preserve for the aye-aye, a rare and unusual lemur famous for its bizarre appearance".

== Business model ==
Mongabay.com is independent and unaffiliated with any organization. The site has been used as an information source by CNN, CBS, the Discovery Channel, NBC, UPI, Yahoo!, and other such outlets.

=== Revenue ===
All of Mongabay's content is free to access on its site, thanks to the volumes of visitors per month - as of January 2008, 2.5 million. In 2008, Butler said that the traffic brought the site $15,000 to $18,000 a month from AdSense, but the decline in advertising revenue across the environmental media sector after the 2008 financial crisis, sharply reduced the site's income. In 2012, Butler launched mongabay.org, a 501(c)(3) organization, to support Mongabay's education program and non-English reporting initiatives as well as expand its environmental reporting initiatives, including grants for journalists. Mongabay phased out advertising on its news content in 2017.

== Publications ==
=== Academic journals ===
Mongabay.com formerly published Tropical Conservation Science, a peer-reviewed, open-access academic journal on the conservation of tropical forests and of other tropical ecosystems. Since its inception in 2008, it has four issues a year, in March, June, September, and December. It used to provide opportunities for scientists in developing countries to publish their research in their native languages, but as of September 2012, Tropical Conservation Science publishes papers only in English. It has been published by SAGE Publications since August 2016 and Mongabay no longer has any affiliation.

=== Other websites ===
On May 19, 2012, Mongabay.com launched an Indonesian language affiliate. In June 2016, Mongabay launched a Spanish-language news service in Latin America. And in January 2018, an Indian website was launched. In 2019, Mongabay established Mongabay-Brasil, a Portuguese-language bureau staffed by Brazilians. Those were followed by Hindi and French sites.

== Non-profit ==
The Mongabayorg Corporation is a nonprofit 501(c)(3) charitable organization headquartered in Menlo Park, California, that raises awareness about social and environmental issues relating to forests and other ecosystems. Mongabay.org was established in 2012 as the non-profit arm of Mongabay.com, an environmental science and conservation news web site launched in 1999. In 2014, Mongabay.com's news production was shifted under Mongabay.org.

By November 2022, Mongabay.org had three main program areas: environmental news production in English, Indonesian, Spanish, Portuguese, Hindi, and French; capacity-building programs for journalists including paid fellowships, and K-8 education. The Bay Area Tropical Forest Network, a social network in the San Francisco Bay Area, was an additional project under Mongabay.org that ran from 2009 until 2019, hosting over 100 in-person events at dozens of venues.

Mongabay.org is a member of the Global Investigative Journalism Network.

=== History ===
Mongabay.org was founded in 2012 by conservation journalist Rhett Ayers Butler. Butler established the non-profit due to his desire to expand the scope of Mongabay's environmental science and conservation news service. By mid-2020, Mongabay was receiving 7 million unique visitors a month on its Mongabay.com and Mongabay.co.id web sites.

The first project under Mongabay.org was Mongabay-Indonesia, an Indonesian-language environmental news service run by a team of journalists in Indonesia. Within a year of launch, Mongabay-Indonesia was the most widely read Indonesian-language environmental news service. By 2015, the site was drawing more than 500,000 unique visitors per month and had correspondents in more than 30 cities and towns across the archipelago.

Butler applied the Mongabay-Indonesia model to Mongabay's global operation in 2014, launching a network-based approach to covering environmental stories in English. The pilot project focused on using data from Global Forest Watch to develop stories about what was happening on the ground the world's forests, including deforestation, conversion to plantations, and conservation. After the nine-month pilot produced over 180 stories in more than 40 countries, including articles that generated significant interest in policy circles, the project was expanded to a range of other topics. The network of paid English-language correspondents reached 50 by mid-2015.

Mongabay.org also provides small grants to journalists to help with travel and reporting costs for stories published in high-profile third party media.

=== Acknowledgements and awards ===
In 2008, Mongabay was named by Time magazine as one of the best "green websites". In 2014, the founder Rhett Ayers Butler became the first journalist to win the Field Museum's Parker-Gentry Award for contributions "in the field of conservation biology whose efforts have had a significant impact on preserving the world's natural heritage and whose actions and approach can serve as a model to others". The website was also the winner of a Science Seeker award in the environment category. Mongabay founder Rhett Butler was selected as a winner of the 2020 SEAL Environmental Journalism Award.

In September 2022, Mongabay founder Rhett Butler was selected as a winner of the 27th Heinz Award for advancing environmental journalism worldwide.

=== Finances ===
Mongabay.org relies primary on grants and donations to fund its activities. Most grants come from philanthropic organizations like the Ford Foundation and the John D. and Catherine T. MacArthur Foundation. Less than one percent of the organization's revenue came from advertising in 2014.

Mongabay.org's network-based approach allows it to run with a small staff relative to its volume of content production.

In 2013, Mongabay.org reported total revenue of $528,128, a five-fold increase from its 2012 revenue of $92,319. Overhead costs amounted to 2.9 percent in 2013, while fundraising costs came in at 2.2 percent. Revenue in 2014 reached $910,569, while in 2015, it hit $1.3 million. In 2017, total revenue eclipsed $2 million.

=== Programs ===
As of May 5, 2021, Mongabay had several program areas under the non-profit, including: Global English News; Mongabay-India (environmental news on India in English and Hindi); Mongabay-Latam (Spanish-language environmental news in Latin America), Mongabay-Brasil (Portuguese-language environmental news on Brazil); Mongabay-Indonesia (environmental news on Indonesia in Bahasa Indonesia); Mongabay Education (environmental education content for pre-K through high school); and internships and fellowships.

=== Efficiency and accountability ===
As of April 29, 2021, Mongabay.org had a 100/100 score on Charity Navigator's Encompass Rating System, which evaluates a nonprofit organization’s financial health including measures of stability, efficiency and sustainability as well as its accountability and transparency policies. Mongabay.org had a Guidestar Platinum Transparency rating, which according to Guidestar "[demonstrates] its commitment to transparency.

=== Leadership ===
Mongabay.org is governed by its board of directors. The founder is a member of the board. Operationally, Butler, is CEO and executive director.

Mongabay.org also has a non-governing advisory board, which includes biologist Peter H. Raven, primatologist Jane Goodall, and William F. Laurance.
