= Chagos Marine Protected Area =

Marine protected area in the Indian Ocean

Coordinates: 6°10′S 72°00′E

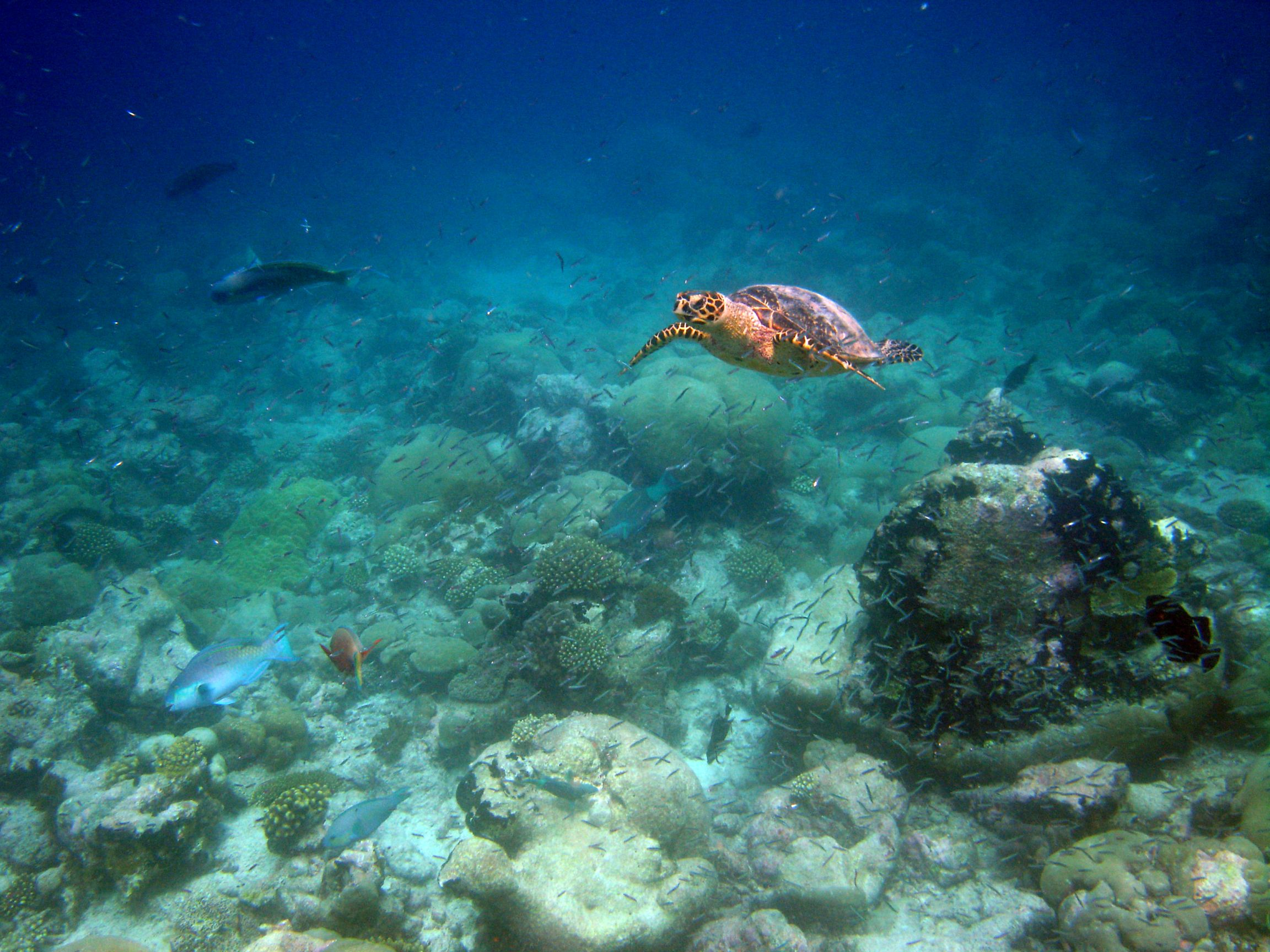
A hawksbill sea turtle on a coral reef in the Chagos Archipelago

The Chagos Marine Protected Area is a marine protected area (MPA) around the Chagos Archipelago in the central Indian Ocean, declared by the United Kingdom on 1 April 2010 in the British Indian Ocean Territory (BIOT). It extends 200 nautical miles from the archipelago's baselines but excludes the atoll of Diego Garcia, the site of a joint British–American military base, and the waters within 3 nautical miles of it. Commercial fishing and other extractive activities are prohibited throughout, making it one of the largest "no-take" marine reserves in the world. The archipelago has some of the healthiest coral reefs in the Indian Ocean, and important populations of seabirds, turtles and coconut crabs.

The MPA has been controversial since its creation. Mauritius, which claims sovereignty over the archipelago, objected that it had not been properly consulted, and exiled Chagossians said that a ban on fishing would prevent them from ever returning. A leaked US embassy cable of 2009 recorded the BIOT Commissioner as saying that a marine park would "put paid to resettlement claims"; a legal challenge on that ground by the Chagossian leader Olivier Bancoult failed in the Supreme Court in 2018. In 2015 an arbitral tribunal under the United Nations Convention on the Law of the Sea (UNCLOS) declared that in establishing the MPA the United Kingdom had breached Articles 2(3), 56(2) and 194(4) of the convention.

In the agreement signed on 22 May 2025, under which the United Kingdom would recognise Mauritian sovereignty over the archipelago, the United Kingdom agreed to support Mauritius in establishing and managing "its Marine Protected Area". On 3 November 2025 the Mauritian government announced plans for a Chagos Archipelago Marine Protected Area (CAMPA) of about 645,835 square kilometres (249,000 sq mi), with four zones and no commercial fishing, to be established after the treaty enters into force. As of October 2026 the treaty had not entered into force.

== Description ==
The Chagos Archipelago lies in the central Indian Ocean, about 2,000 kilometres (1,200 mi) north-east of Mauritius. It consists of 55 small islands; Diego Garcia contains about half of the total land area. The Great Chagos Bank is the world's largest atoll by area. The archipelago contains more than 60,000 square kilometres (23,000 sq mi) of shallow limestone platform and reefs, and between 25 and 50 per cent of the Indian Ocean's reef area that remains in excellent condition.

Sources give different figures for the area of the MPA. (Note: The arbitral tribunal described it as "more than half a million square kilometres"; Sheppard and colleagues (2012) gave about 550,000 square kilometres (212,000 sq mi); the BIOT Administration, the Chagos Conservation Trust and the House of Lords International Agreements Committee give 640,000 square kilometres (247,000 sq mi); and the Foreign Secretary's announcement in 2010 referred to "some quarter of a million square miles".) The BIOT Administration gives it as 640,000 square kilometres (247,000 sq mi), and says that its declaration "doubled the previous global no-take area". The deep waters out to the 200-nautical-mile limit contain, according to Sheppard and colleagues, 86 unfished seamounts and 243 deep knolls; the 2012 conservation management plan put the number of seamounts at about 300, and the Chagos Conservation Trust refers to trenches 6,000 m deep.

Diego Garcia, which is excluded from the MPA, contains a Ramsar wetland site and several strict nature reserves. Several islands of the outer atolls are also strict nature reserves, which no one may approach within 3 nautical miles. Visiting yachts could apply for permits to moor at approved anchorages in the outer islands for safe passage across the Indian Ocean, and were allowed to fish only with a hand line for their own consumption; since 31 March 2026 the BIOT Administration has paused substantive consideration of new permit applications, except in exceptional circumstances, because of litigation about entry to the territory.

=== Management ===
The BIOT Administration "has responsibility for the management and monitoring" of the MPA, including measures against illegal, unreported and unregulated fishing and the monitoring of marine biodiversity. The Foreign, Commonwealth and Development Office funds the administration and, through its Blue Belt Programme, had provided £1,230,562 between 1 April 2022 and March 2025 to support the administration's management of the MPA. Enforcement relies on a patrol vessel. In September 2010 ministers agreed in principle a deal, reported at £3.5 million, under which the Bertarelli Foundation would fund the policing of the reserve, including the provision of the patrol boat Pacific Marlin, after fears that the loss of about £750,000 a year in tuna-licence fees could prevent the project. In 2025 Mongabay described the protection as "far from perfect, with just one patrol boat for an area larger than France", and reported that the vessel had intercepted Sri Lankan boats carrying sharks. Bryan Wilson, a scientific adviser to the Chagos Conservation Trust, told Mongabay that shark numbers had fallen sharply during the COVID-19 pandemic, when surveillance was reduced.

== History ==
=== Proposal and consultation ===
Before 2010 the waters of the archipelago were already an Environmental (Preservation and Protection) Zone, with controls on fishing, pollution and the taking of animals, but licensed fishing continued: an international tuna fishery and a small inshore fishery on the reefs. The tuna licences brought in between £700,000 and £1 million a year, which went towards the running costs of the territory's patrol vessel. The idea of a no-take reserve came from the Pew Environment Group, which proposed it to the territory's environmental adviser, Charles Sheppard, in July 2007. In March 2009 the Chagos Environment Network, a coalition of conservation and scientific organisations, published The Chagos Archipelago: its Nature and the Future, which called for one of the world's largest marine protected areas. At bilateral talks with Mauritius in Port Louis on 21 July 2009 the Mauritian side welcomed the proposal "in principle", and both sides agreed that officials and scientists would examine it.

The British government held a public consultation from 10 November 2009 to 5 March 2010. Mauritius objected to the consultation taking place outside the bilateral talks. More than a quarter of a million people registered a view, mostly through petitions, and "well over 90%" of respondents supported greater marine protection "of some sort" in principle; the facilitator reported, however, that views on the proposal itself were "more mixed", the main difference being over the possible resettlement of Chagossians. The Whale and Dolphin Conservation Society supported a large reserve, but objected that Chagossians and Mauritius had not been properly involved and that Diego Garcia, where naval sonar was used, was to be left out.

=== Declaration ===
On 31 March 2010 the Foreign Secretary, David Miliband, decided against officials' advice to have the full no-take MPA declared, and on 1 April the BIOT Commissioner, Colin Roberts, issued Proclamation No. 1 of 2010. Announcing it, Miliband said that it would "double the global coverage of the world's oceans under protection", and that it would "not change the UK's commitment to cede the Territory to Mauritius when it is no longer needed for defence purposes". The United Kingdom later explained the timing to the arbitral tribunal by the general election called on 6 April 2010, saying that 1 April was "the last possible date he could do so before the election". Mauritius protested on 2 April that it would not recognise the MPA. The no-take regime was brought into effect by allowing existing fishing licences to expire; the last expired in October 2010.

== Ecology and biodiversity ==
According to the BIOT Administration, the territory's waters contain more than 220 species of coral, 855 species of fish and 355 species of molluscs. Pollutant levels in Chagos waters and marine life were described by the Foreign Office in 2010 as "exceptionally low".

=== Coral ===
The reefs are home to at least 220 species of coral, including the brain coral Ctenella chagius, which the Chagos Conservation Trust describes as endemic. Coral cover is dense even in deep water on the steep outer reef slopes, and thick stands of branching staghorn coral protect the low islands from wave erosion. Because of the lack of direct human pressure, the trust describes the reserve as a reference site against which the recovery of other reefs can be compared. After the 1998 warming event, which caused up to 90 per cent coral mortality across the region, Chagos reefs recovered much faster than those of the surrounding Indian Ocean. During the global coral bleaching event of 2015–2016 up to 85 per cent of the corals in the reserve were estimated to have been damaged or killed. Another bleaching episode in 2024 affected about a third of the coral cover.

=== Fish ===
At least 784 species of reef-associated fish have been recorded, including the endemic Chagos clownfish (Amphiprion chagosensis), and large wrasse and grouper that have disappeared from overfished reefs elsewhere in the region. The waters also hold pelagic species such as manta rays, sharks and tuna, including the silky shark. Shark numbers fell sharply before 2010 because of illegal fishing for fins and bycatch in the licensed tuna fisheries; the 2012 management plan recorded a 90 per cent fall in the average number of reef sharks observed. The Chagos Conservation Trust considers that the deep-water areas "almost certainly harbour many undiscovered and specially adapted species".

=== Turtles ===
The islands are nesting sites for green (Chelonia mydas) and hawksbill (Eretmochelys imbricata) turtles, whose Chagos populations the Chagos Conservation Trust considers of global significance. About 300–700 hawksbills and 400–800 green turtles were estimated to nest each year across the islands, the largest numbers on Diego Garcia. Both populations had been heavily exploited during the previous two centuries, and were recovering by 2012.

=== Mammals ===
A research vessel that surveyed sperm whales in the territory's waters in 2002 recorded high cetacean abundance and diversity, including sperm whales, bottlenose, striped, pantropical spotted and Risso's dolphins, pilot whales, orcas and beaked whales. The 2012 management plan noted large schools of spinner and bottlenose dolphins around the reefs, but that there was no monitoring of marine mammals, and that the dugong, once recorded in Chagos, "has long been extinct there".

=== Birds ===
Eighteen species of seabird breed in the archipelago, five of them in globally important numbers, and ten islands have been designated as Important Bird Areas by BirdLife International. The largest colonies are of sooty terns (Sterna fuscata), brown and lesser noddies (Anous stolidus and A. tenuirostris), wedge-tailed shearwaters (Puffinus pacificus) and red-footed boobies (Sula sula). Rats introduced on several islands prey on ground-nesting species, and the trust regards their removal as an important part of the reserve's management.

=== Coconut crabs ===
The coconut crab (Birgus latro), the world's largest terrestrial arthropod, is abundant on the islands. In 2010 the Ramsar area of Diego Garcia had an average density of 298 crabs per hectare, the highest average ever recorded. Because their larvae travel long distances, the Chagos crabs are considered a source for replenishing over-exploited populations elsewhere in the Indian Ocean.

== Scientific research ==
Sheppard and colleagues described the archipelago in 2012 as "ideally situated" for several monitoring programmes. In February and March 2013 a research expedition sponsored by the Bertarelli Foundation, with Stanford University and the University of Western Australia, piloted electronic tagging to monitor the movements of pelagic species; 99 tags were placed on 95 animals, and acoustic receivers were installed around two northern atolls.

== Pollution ==
In March 2014 The Independent reported that American ships had discharged waste, including treated sewage, into the lagoon of Diego Garcia for three decades, and that the Foreign Office had admitted that its "no discharge policy" was not complied with by US vessels. A report by the territory's scientific adviser, Charles Sheppard, which the government released only after a request under environmental information rules, described the British patrol vessel Pacific Marlin as "a regular culprit in terms of sewage discharge" while docked at Diego Garcia. The Foreign Office said that procedures were now in place to prevent discharges from the vessel in port, and that the impact of any past discharges was likely to have been minimal. The environmental lawyer Peter Sand said that the reserve would "remain an empty shell as long as it totally excludes the Diego Garcia military base".

== Chagossians ==
The Chagossians, the archipelago's inhabitants, were removed by the United Kingdom between 1968 and 1973 to make way for the base on Diego Garcia. When the MPA was proposed, Chagossian groups argued that a ban on fishing, their main livelihood, would in effect bar them from ever returning; Roch Evenor of the UK Chagos Support Association said: "There would be a natural injustice. The fish would have more rights than us." Bancoult suggested that the government was preparing a fall-back if it lost the Chagossians' case at the European Court of Human Rights. Conservation organisations denied that they were being used to prevent a return, and the Pew Environment Group said that conservation measures would be adjusted if the Chagossians won a right to return. The government maintained that the MPA "is not a bar to resettlement". Academic critics described the reserve as an example of "fortress conservation"; Peter Sand saw in it "a fundamental conflict between colonial nature protection and the human rights of the indigenous Chagos islanders".

An exemption allows fishing around Diego Garcia, which is outside the MPA; according to The Guardian, more than 28 tonnes of fish were caught in 2010 for personnel on the base. In 2014 the Foreign Office commissioned a new study of the feasibility of resettlement, whose terms of reference included fishing among the possible activities of a resettled community. Under the planned Mauritian protected area, a zone of 7,261 square kilometres (2,800 sq mi) around Peros Banhos and the Salomon Islands would be set aside for the resettlement of Chagossians, with a low level of artisanal fishing for their sustenance.

=== The WikiLeaks cable and Bancoult (No 3) ===
A US embassy cable of 15 May 2009, recording a meeting at the Foreign Office on 12 May, was published by The Guardian on 2 December 2010 and by The Daily Telegraph on 4 February 2011, after being passed to them by WikiLeaks. It recorded Roberts, then the Foreign Office's Director for Overseas Territories and BIOT Commissioner, as saying that "establishing a marine park would, in effect, put paid to resettlement claims of the archipelago's former residents". The cable's author commented: "Establishing a marine reserve might, indeed, as the FCO's Roberts stated, be the most effective long-term way to prevent any of the Chagos Islands' former inhabitants or their descendants from resettling in the BIOT."

Bancoult challenged the creation of the MPA by judicial review, alleging that it had been created for the improper purpose of preventing resettlement, and that the consultation had been unfair because it did not mention Mauritius' arguable fishing rights. The Divisional Court dismissed the claim on 11 June 2013, and the Court of Appeal, while holding the cable admissible in evidence, dismissed his appeal on 23 May 2014. On 8 February 2018 the Supreme Court dismissed a further appeal by five votes to two. Lord Mance, for the majority, said that the suggestion that Miliband was motivated by a desire to make return difficult "finds no basis in the documentation or exchanges and has to my mind no plausibility at all"; Lord Kerr and Lady Hale dissented.

=== Greenpeace ===
In 2012 the Mauritian government initially asked Greenpeace to postpone a call at Port Louis by its ship Rainbow Warrior, because of the organisation's support for the British marine park. In a letter of 2 October 2012 Greenpeace International's executive director, Kumi Naidoo, wrote that "our support for the Marine Protected Area was, and remains, subject to the clear proviso that it should be without prejudice to the rights of the Chagossians or the sovereignty claim of Mauritius", and that Greenpeace supported the Chagossians' "struggle for the right to return home". The ship was then allowed to moor at Port Louis, subject to conditions.

== Arbitration under the Law of the Sea Convention (2010–2015) ==
On 20 December 2010 Mauritius began arbitration proceedings against the United Kingdom under Annex VII of UNCLOS. It argued that the United Kingdom was not the "coastal State" entitled to declare the MPA, and that the MPA was incompatible with undertakings the United Kingdom had given in 1965, when it detached the archipelago from Mauritius, and with the convention. The Mauritian prime minister, Navin Ramgoolam, told the National Assembly in 2011 that the United Kingdom, "not being a 'coastal State'", had no authority to establish the area.

In its award of 18 March 2015 the five-member tribunal held, by three votes to two, that it had no jurisdiction over Mauritius' claims that turned on sovereignty. It held unanimously that the United Kingdom's undertakings to return the archipelago when it was no longer needed for defence purposes, to preserve for Mauritius the benefit of any minerals or oil, and to ensure that fishing rights remained available to Mauritius as far as practicable, were legally binding, the last "insofar as it relates to the territorial sea". It then declared unanimously that "in establishing the MPA surrounding the Chagos Archipelago the United Kingdom breached its obligations under Articles 2(3), 56(2), and 194(4) of the Convention". It found that the United Kingdom had neither consulted Mauritius properly nor balanced Mauritius' rights against its own interests, as good faith and "due regard" required. It found nothing in the internal British documents before it to suggest an improper purpose, and declined to place weight on the leaked cable. The tribunal stressed that it had taken "no view on the substantive quality or nature of the MPA", and that its concern "has been with the manner in which the MPA was established, rather than its substance"; it was open to the parties to negotiate a mutually satisfactory arrangement under a "sovereignty umbrella".

The Mauritian prime minister, Anerood Jugnauth, called the award a historic ruling. The Foreign Office said that it was pleased that the tribunal had found no improper motive, and that it would work with Mauritius to reconcile its fishing ambitions with conservation. The BIOT Administration later wrote that, "Contrary to subsequent speculation", the tribunal had not declared the MPA illegal, but had found that the United Kingdom should have consulted Mauritius more fully. The two governments held three rounds of talks on the MPA, in November 2015, May 2016 and August 2016, without agreement; in May 2016 Jugnauth told the National Assembly that Mauritius considered the MPA to have no legal effect, a view the United Kingdom did not share. On 4 November 2016, after a request for an advisory opinion had been placed on the United Nations General Assembly's agenda, Mauritius asked for the talks to be put on hold. In the Bancoult (No 3) appeal the government told the Supreme Court that it was committed to implementing the award, which, it said, did not require the termination of the MPA.

== ICJ advisory opinion and ITLOS judgment ==
In its advisory opinion of 25 February 2019 on the separation of the Chagos Archipelago, the International Court of Justice (ICJ) recorded the tribunal's findings on the MPA, and concluded that the decolonisation of Mauritius "was not lawfully completed" when it became independent in 1968 and that the United Kingdom was under an obligation to end its administration of the archipelago "as rapidly as possible". After the General Assembly endorsed the opinion, Mauritius told diplomatic missions that marine scientific research in the archipelago's waters required its consent; the United Kingdom replied that any approval granted by Mauritius "would not be recognized or accepted".

In 2021 a special chamber of the International Tribunal for the Law of the Sea (ITLOS), deciding preliminary objections in the Mauritius–Maldives maritime boundary case, held that the arbitral award did not recognise the United Kingdom as the coastal state, and that the archipelago "has been subject to a special regime, according to which Mauritius is entitled to certain maritime rights". It concluded that Mauritius "can be regarded as the coastal State in respect of the Chagos Archipelago" for the purpose of delimiting the boundary.

== Future under the 2025 agreement ==
=== Treaty provisions ===
In a joint statement on 3 October 2024 announcing a political agreement, the two governments said that they would cooperate on environmental protection and against illegal fishing, "with the shared objective of securing and protecting one of the world's most important marine environments", adding: "This will include the establishment of a Mauritian Marine Protected Area." The treaty, signed in London and Port Louis on 22 May 2025, provides that Mauritius is sovereign over the archipelago, and that the United Kingdom will lease Diego Garcia for an initial period of 99 years. Its preamble records the parties' desire "to promote the protection and conservation of the environment of the Chagos Archipelago, including its unique marine environment and biodiversity". Among the rights retained by Mauritius is "conservation and protection of the environment, including the marine environment".

Article 5 deals with the environment. The United Kingdom is to exercise its rights on Diego Garcia in accordance with international environmental law "and with due regard to applicable Mauritian environmental laws". Article 5(2) provides:

The United Kingdom agrees to provide support and assistance to Mauritius in the establishment and management of its Marine Protected Area in the Chagos Archipelago, in accordance with terms to be agreed between the Parties by a separate written instrument.

The parties are also to cooperate on other environmental matters, including spills and "illegal, unreported and unregulated fishing". In a Strategic Partnership Framework agreed the same day, the United Kingdom offered "technical expertise to develop and manage the Chagos Archipelago Marine Protected Area, pursuant to the agreement on the exercise of sovereignty over the Chagos Archipelago".

The treaty enters into force on the first day of the month after both parties have notified each other that their internal procedures are complete. In April 2026 the British government said that agreeing an update to its 1966 exchange of notes with the United States, which it considered necessary for ratification, had become "impossible to agree at political level", and the implementing bill lapsed at the end of the parliamentary session. On 13 October 2026 a minister told the House of Lords that "We will return to the Bill in due course."

=== Support for a Mauritian protected area ===
The House of Lords International Agreements Committee reported in June 2025 that the treaty "does not specify any detail about the support which the UK will provide to Mauritius in establishing the MPA". Bryan Wilson told the committee that an ambitious Mauritian protected area, with British and international support, "might well improve on the existing MPA", but that with only two ocean-going vessels and two small aircraft "Mauritius would have an enormous task ahead of it". The committee welcomed the government's assurance that it would work with Mauritius "to establish a well-resourced and patrolled Marine Protected Area", and called for part of the development grant under the treaty to be used to support it.

In a letter to the Commons Foreign Affairs Committee in July 2025, the minister Stephen Doughty said that the separate instrument "will likely be an environmental cooperation Memorandum of Understanding (MOU)", that officials "have already begun initial conversations with Mauritius to develop this", and that it would cover technical support for the protected area, sustainable fisheries management in resettlement areas, protection of habitats and species, and scientific partnership. He said that "the UK will not be making any additional direct payments to Mauritius to support the establishment of the MPA", and that support would take the form of technical assistance under the Strategic Partnership Framework. In answers to parliamentary questions the government said in June 2025 that the support "shall be agreed before entry into force of the treaty", and in September 2025 that the process to agree it was "already underway", but declined to give a running commentary on the implementation talks.

According to the government, Foreign Office officials met the Chagos Conservation Trust, the Zoological Society of London and the BIOT Administration's chief scientific adviser "as part of stakeholder engagement" on various occasions, including on seven dates between 10 October 2024 and 17 April 2025. The Environment Secretary, Steve Reed, discussed "the continued management and protection" of the MPA with the Mauritian prime minister, Navin Ramgoolam, at the United Nations Ocean Conference in Nice on 9 June 2025. In September 2026 a minister said that ministers and officials had "engaged with a range of stakeholders, including environmental organisations", on the future environmental protection of the archipelago.

=== Chagos Archipelago Marine Protected Area ===
Mauritius outlined plans for its own protected area in 2024, using criteria of the International Union for Conservation of Nature (IUCN). According to Heather Koldewey of the Zoological Society of London, work begun with the Mauritian authorities in 2024 laid the scientific basis and drew up a zoning framework; researchers at Stanford University also contributed work on including Chagossian heritage in its design. On 3 November 2025 the Prime Minister's Office announced that the government had decided to create a Chagos Archipelago Marine Protected Area (CAMPA) of about 645,835 km^{2}. According to the government, it would comprise four zones based on IUCN protected area categories:

- a strict conservation zone of 23,712 km^{2} (IUCN category Ib), protecting the Great Chagos Bank, where Chagossians could make supervised visits;
- a conservation zone of 612,611 km^{2} (category II), covering about 95 per cent of the area, where fishing would be permitted "under an agreed sustainable quota for artisanal, traditional, ceremonial and subsistence purposes";
- a habitat protection zone of 2,251 km^{2} (category IV), allowing a low level of artisanal fishing and small-scale tourism; and
- a traditional zone for resettlement of 7,261 km^{2} (category V), on Peros Banhos and the Salomon Islands.

The government stated: "No commercial fishing will be allowed in the entire CAMPA." A five-year roadmap provides for CAMPA to become a statutory body under the Prime Minister's Office, and for phased resettlement, management plans and enforcement.

The British government welcomed the announcement, describing it as "confirming plans for the establishment of a Marine Protected Area after entry into force of the Treaty". In October 2026 a minister said that during the negotiations "Mauritius committed to ensure the marine environment would be effectively protected under a future Chagos Archipelago Marine Protected Area", and that the United Kingdom had agreed to support it. Asked in the Commons in January 2026 whether Mauritius could protect the area, Doughty said that both countries were committed to its protection and: "We are working closely with Mauritius to ensure that adequate patrolling capabilities will be maintained after the marine protected area enters into force." The Conservative MP who asked the question, Blake Stephenson, said that Mauritius had admitted that it lacked the capacity to patrol the area.

From 31 March to 2 April 2026 the Prime Minister's Office held a workshop in Port Louis on CAMPA, organised with the Zoological Society of London and with the support of the British High Commission, attended by Mauritian participants, Chagossian representatives and experts from the United Kingdom, the United States and the IUCN. It discussed the proposed legislation, the management of the zones, surveillance, priority species and the involvement of the Chagossian community. The British high commissioner, Paul Brummell, said that the workshop reflected the strengthening partnership between the two countries. The Attorney General, Gavin Glover, announced a budget for CAMPA's management and surveillance of at least Rs 375 million a year from the third year after the treaty enters into force. Bancoult, the leader of the Chagos Refugees Group, said that the Chagossians must take part in protecting the archipelago.

Commentators have questioned how the area would be protected after a transfer. Mongabay wrote in December 2025 that "the contours of that protection are hazy", and quoted Wilson as warning that commercial exploitation "would have a truly catastrophic effect on this environment". Wilson supported low-impact Chagossian settlement, arguing that permanent residents could deter illegal fishing.

== See also ==
- Mauritius v United Kingdom
- Chagos Archipelago sovereignty dispute
- List of largest protected areas in the world
- Fortress conservation
- Ecological imperialism

== Sources ==
=== Treaty and government documents ===
- Agreement between the Government of the United Kingdom of Great Britain and Northern Ireland and the Government of the Republic of Mauritius concerning the Chagos Archipelago including Diego Garcia (CS Mauritius No.1/2025, CP 1334) (Report). Foreign, Commonwealth and Development Office. 22 May 2025.
- "UK and Mauritius joint statement, 3 October 2024" (Press release). Foreign, Commonwealth and Development Office. 3 October 2024.
- "Joint Communique: UK-Mauritius Strategic Partnership Framework" (Press release). Foreign, Commonwealth and Development Office. 22 May 2025.
- "Chagos Archipelago Marine Protected Area". Chagos Archipelago. Government of Mauritius.
- "Statement by Dr the Hon. Prime Minister to the National Assembly" (PDF). Government of Mauritius. 31 May 2011. Archived from the original (PDF) on 16 November 2012.
- "Marine Protected Area". British Indian Ocean Territory Administration.
- "How to apply for a mooring permit". British Indian Ocean Territory Administration.
- Consultation on whether to establish a marine protected area in the British Indian Ocean Territory (PDF) (Report). Foreign and Commonwealth Office. 10 November 2009. Archived from the original (PDF) on 12 May 2012.
- Stevenson, Rosemary (2010). Whether to establish a marine protected area in the British Indian Ocean Territory: Consultation report (PDF) (Report). Foreign and Commonwealth Office.
- "New protection for marine life" (Press release). Foreign and Commonwealth Office. 1 April 2010. Archived from the original on 1 December 2011.
- United Nations Secretary-General (18 May 2020). Advisory opinion of the International Court of Justice on the legal consequences of the separation of the Chagos Archipelago from Mauritius in 1965: Report of the Secretary-General (A/74/834) (Report). United Nations.

=== Parliamentary material ===
- Loft, Philip; Curtis, John (8 September 2025). 2025 treaty on the British Indian Ocean Territory/Chagos Archipelago (Report). Research Briefing CBP-10273. House of Commons Library.
- House of Lords International Agreements Committee (25 June 2025). UK-Mauritius Agreement on the Chagos Archipelago including Diego Garcia (PDF) (Report). 9th Report of Session 2024–26, HL Paper 146. House of Lords.
- "Chagos Islands: Marine Protection". Hansard, House of Commons. 20 January 2026.
- "Diego Garcia Military Base and British Indian Ocean Territory Bill". Hansard, House of Commons. 13 April 2026.
- "Diego Garcia Military Base and British Indian Ocean Territory Bill". Hansard, House of Lords. 13 October 2026.
- Anelay, Joyce (26 March 2015). "Chagossians: Resettlement (HL5935)". UK Parliament: Written questions, answers and statements.
- Doughty, Stephen (18 March 2025). "British Indian Ocean Territory: Marine Protected Areas (36452)". UK Parliament: Written questions, answers and statements.
- Doughty, Stephen (11 June 2025). "British Indian Ocean Territory: Marine Protected Areas (54739)". UK Parliament: Written questions, answers and statements.
- Doughty, Stephen (23 June 2025). "British Indian Ocean Territory: Marine Protected Areas (58956)". UK Parliament: Written questions, answers and statements.
- Doughty, Stephen (1 July 2025). "Chagos Islands: Marine Protected Areas (62078)". UK Parliament: Written questions, answers and statements.
- Doughty, Stephen (3 September 2025). "Chagos Islands: Fisheries (69771)". UK Parliament: Written questions, answers and statements.
- Doughty, Stephen (9 September 2025). "Chagos Islands: Marine Protected Areas (70431)". UK Parliament: Written questions, answers and statements.
- Doughty, Stephen (12 November 2025). "Chagos Islands: Marine Protected Areas (88230)". UK Parliament: Written questions, answers and statements.
- Hardy, Emma (2 July 2025). "Marine Protected Areas: Chagos Archipelago (62572)". UK Parliament: Written questions, answers and statements.
- Winterton, Rosie (25 September 2026). "Diego Garcia Military Base and British Indian Ocean Territory Bill (HL3443)". UK Parliament: Written questions, answers and statements.
- Wood, Stewart (1 October 2026). "Mauritius: Marine Protected Areas (HL3696)". UK Parliament: Written questions, answers and statements.

=== Court and tribunal decisions ===
- In the Matter of the Chagos Marine Protected Area Arbitration (Mauritius v. United Kingdom): Award (PDF). Permanent Court of Arbitration. 18 March 2015.
- Notification under Article 287 and Annex VII, Article 1 of UNCLOS and the Statement of the Claim and Grounds on which it is Based. Permanent Court of Arbitration. 20 December 2010.
- Written Statement of the United Kingdom (PDF). International Court of Justice. 15 February 2018.
- R (Bancoult) v Secretary of State for Foreign and Commonwealth Affairs, EWHC (Admin) 1502 (High Court (Divisional Court) 11 June 2013).
- R (Bancoult) v Secretary of State for Foreign and Commonwealth Affairs, EWCA Civ 708 (Court of Appeal 23 May 2014).
- R (Bancoult No 3) v Secretary of State for Foreign and Commonwealth Affairs, UKSC 3 (Supreme Court 8 February 2018).
- Legal Consequences of the Separation of the Chagos Archipelago from Mauritius in 1965, Advisory Opinion (PDF). I.C.J. Reports 2019. International Court of Justice. 25 February 2019. p. 95.
- Dispute concerning delimitation of the maritime boundary between Mauritius and Maldives in the Indian Ocean (Mauritius/Maldives), Preliminary Objections, Judgment (PDF). ITLOS Reports 2020–2021. International Tribunal for the Law of the Sea. 28 January 2021. p. 17.

=== Scientific and conservation sources ===
- "Tagging of Pelagics". Bertarelli Foundation. 2013. Archived from the original on 4 October 2013.
- "Birds". Chagos Conservation Trust. Archived from the original on 3 July 2012.
- "Coconut crabs". Chagos Conservation Trust. Archived from the original on 5 July 2012.
- "Corals". Chagos Conservation Trust. Archived from the original on 7 July 2012.
- "Fish". Chagos Conservation Trust. Archived from the original on 5 July 2012.
- "About the Chagos marine reserve". Chagos Conservation Trust. Archived from the original on 5 July 2012.
- "Turtles". Chagos Conservation Trust. Archived from the original on 5 July 2012.
- De Santo, E. M.; Jones, P. J. S.; Miller, A. M. M. (March 2011). "Fortress conservation at sea: A commentary on the Chagos marine protected area". Marine Policy. 35 (2): 258–260. doi:10.1016/j.marpol.2010.09.004.
- Friends of the Chagos (February 2003). "Expedition of the Odyssey" (PDF). Chagos News. No. 21. p. 5. ISSN 1355-6746. Archived from the original (PDF) on 16 March 2016.
- Hoyt, Erich (February 2010). "Concerns about the Chagos Archipelago MPA Proposal". Whale and Dolphin Conservation Society. Archived from the original on 21 August 2018.
- Sand, Peter H. (March 2012). "Fortress Conservation Trumps Human Rights?: The "Marine Protected Area" in the Chagos Archipelago". The Journal of Environment & Development. 21 (1): 36–39. doi:10.1177/1070496511435666.
- Sheppard, C. R. C.; et al. (March 2012). "Reefs and islands of the Chagos Archipelago, Indian Ocean: why it is the world's largest no-take marine protected area". Aquatic Conservation: Marine and Freshwater Ecosystems. 22 (2): 232–261. doi:10.1002/aqc.1248. PMC 4260629. PMID 25505830.
- Sheppard, Charles; Carr, Peter; Graham, Nicholas; et al. (July 2012). Conservation and Management in British Indian Ocean Territory (Chagos Archipelago) (PDF) (Report). Archived from the original (PDF) on 2 November 2012.

=== News reports and commentary ===
- Amla, Hajira (26 March 2015). "Chagossians on shaky ground after Mauritius-UK tribunal ruling, says Seychelles association". Seychelles News Agency. Archived from the original on 5 July 2018.
- Amos, Jonathan (7 June 2016). "Bleaching 'devastates' Chagos Marine Reserve". BBC News.
- Arjanee, Ameerah (2 October 2026). "UK-Mauritius Chagos sovereignty deal stalls amid fears of further delays". Al Jazeera English.
- Bowcott, Owen; Jones, Sam (19 March 2015). "UN ruling raises hope of return for exiled Chagos islanders". The Guardian.
- Bowcott, Owen; Vidal, John (28 January 2013). "Britain faces UN tribunal over Chagos Islands marine reserve". The Guardian.
- "Chagos and Tromelin: Mauritius adamant to recover excised territories". News on Sunday. Le Défi Media Group. 20 May 2016.
- "CAMPA : Maurice officialise la protection de 645 000 km² autour des Chagos". Le Défi Media (in French). 3 November 2025.
- "Chagos Archipelago Marine Protected Area : assurer la protection des espèces". Le Défi Media (in French). 1 April 2026.
- Hutchins, Rob (25 November 2025). "Mauritius' vision for vast Marine Protected Area in Chagos Islands". Oceanographic.
- "Billionaire saves marine reserve plans". The Independent. Press Association. 12 September 2010.
- "Ile Maurice: Aucune pêche commerciale ne sera autorisée". L'Express (in French). 3 November 2025 – via allAfrica.
- "«Chagos Archipelago Marine Protected Area» : Maurice dessine les contours d'une des plus vastes aires marines protégées au monde". L'Express (in French). 1 April 2026.
- "Souveraineté des Chagos : Greenpeace dissipe des doutes sur la MPA". Le Mauricien (in French). 7 October 2012.
- Milmo, Cahal (28 March 2014). "Exclusive: British Government under fire for pollution of pristine lagoon". The Independent.
- Norton-Taylor, Richard; Evans, Rob (21 December 2010). "WikiLeaks cables: Mauritius sues UK for control of Chagos islands". The Guardian.
- Vidal, John (29 March 2010). "Chagos Islanders attack plan to turn archipelago into protected area". The Guardian.
- Vidal, John (13 March 2014). "Chagos islands: UK experts to carry out resettlement study". The Guardian.
- Vyawahare, Malavika (15 December 2025). "A deal signals a new chapter for Chagossians, and one of the world's largest marine no-fishing zones". Mongabay.
