= Dinadiawan River Protected Landscape =

Protected area in the Philippines

- IUCN category V (protected landscape/seascape)
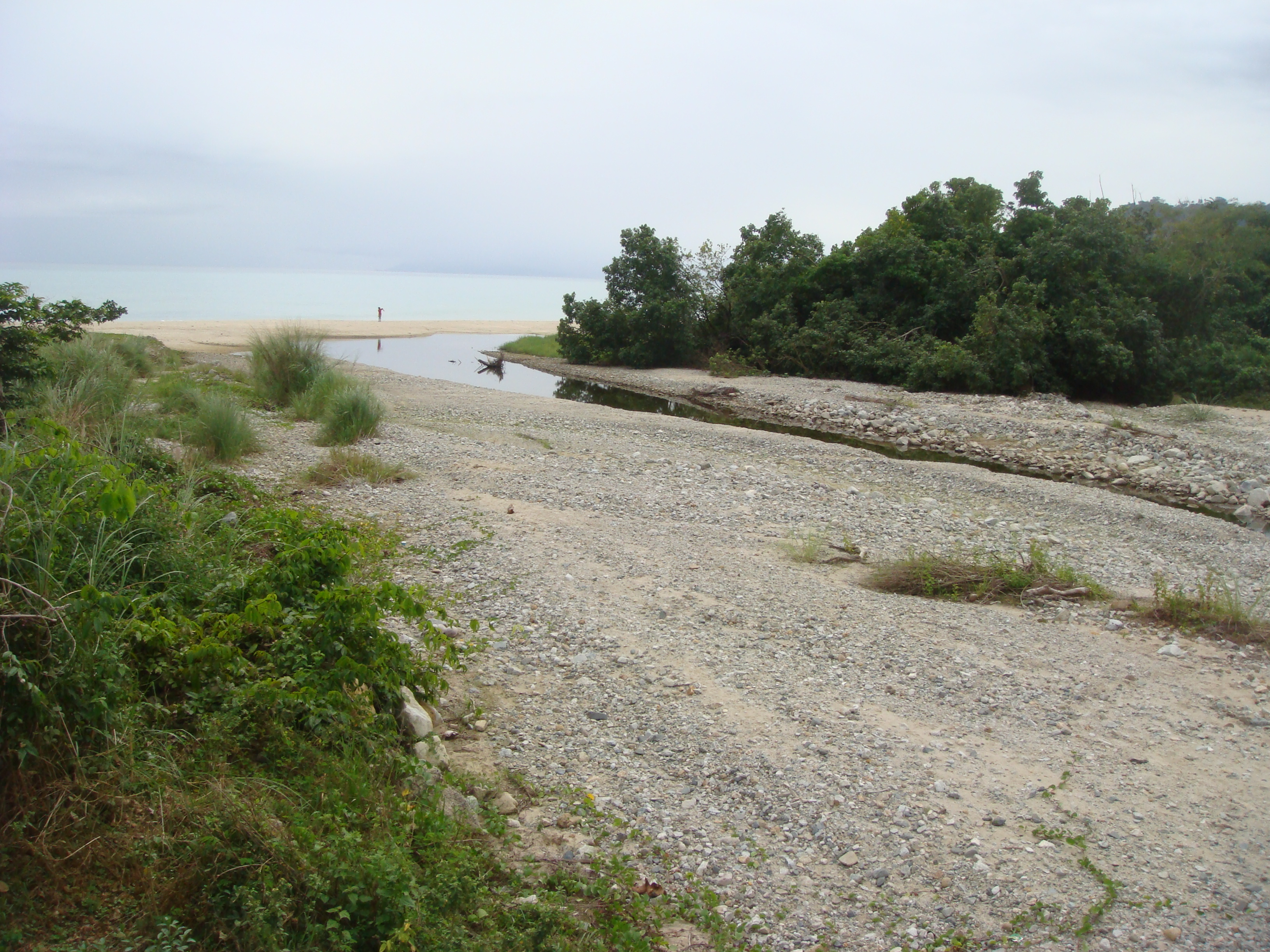
- Dinadiawan River

- Location within Philippines
- Location: Aurora, Philippines
- Nearest city: San Jose
- Coordinates: 16°5′12″N 121°46′13″E
- Area: 3,371.332 hectares (8,330.74 acres)
- Established: June 9, 1992 (Watershed forest reserve); April 23, 2000 (Protected landscape)
- Governing body: Department of Environment and Natural Resources

The Dinadiawan River Protected Landscape is a protected area covering the stretch of the Dinadiawan River from its headwaters in the Sierra Madre mountain range to its mouth on the Philippine Sea coast of the village of Dinadiawan in Aurora province, Philippines. The park covers an area of 3,371.332 hectares (8,330.74 acres) and includes its surrounding forested mountains, waterfalls and springs in Dipaculao municipality. It is composed of 2,645 hectares (6,540 acres) of forested area, 323 hectares (800 acres) of grassland, 151 hectares (370 acres) of forested shrubland, 144 hectares (360 acres) of cultivated area, and 108 hectares (270 acres) of the Dinadiawan River. Its forest cover consists primarily of dipterocarp trees like tanguile, mayapis, white lauan, red lauan and bagtikan. It serves as a habitat of wild fauna such as the Philippine deer, Philippine long-tailed macaque, Philippine warty pig, spotted wood kingfisher and pygmy swiftlet.

First established as a watershed forest reserve with an area of 3,387 hectares (8,370 acres) through Proclamation No. 918 issued by President Corazón Aquino in 1992, the protected area is now a declared Protected Landscape under the National Integrated Protected Areas System with the issuance of Proclamation No. 278 in 2000 by President Joseph Estrada.

The park is one of five protected areas in the province of Aurora.
