= Talaytay Protected Landscape =

- IUCN category V (protected landscape/seascape)
- Location within Philippines
- Location: Aurora, Philippines
- Nearest city: Santiago
- Coordinates: 16°10′22″N 121°55′0″E
- Area: 3,526.29 hectares (8,713.7 acres)
- Established: December 3, 1990 (Watershed forest reserve); April 23, 2000 (Protected landscape)
- Governing body: Department of Environment and Natural Resources

The Talaytay Protected Landscape is a protected area in northern Aurora, Philippines that preserves the Talaytay River watershed in the Sierra Madre mountain range of Central Luzon. It encompasses an area of 3,526.29 hectares (8,713.7 acres) stretching from the rugged interior containing the headwaters of the Talaytay River to its mouth at the lowland area of Dinalungan municipality. The park is known to harbor several important flora of the dipterocarp variety, including Dipterocarpus grandiflorus (apitong), Shorea polysperma (tanguile), Shorea squamata (mayapis), Shorea contorta (white lauan), Shorea negrosensis (red lauan), Parashorea malaanonan (bagtikan), and Shorea philippinensis (mangasinoro). It is home to a number of wildlife such as the Philippine deer, Philippine long-tailed macaque and some avifauna species.

First established as a watershed forest reserve in 1990 through Proclamation No. 670 signed by President Corazón Aquino, the park was upgraded to a protected landscape area in 2000 with the signing of Proclamation No. 283 by President Joseph Estrada. It is one of five protected areas located entirely within the province of Aurora.
