= Simbahan–Talagas Protected Landscape =

Protected area in Philippines

- IUCN category V (protected landscape/seascape)
- Location within Philippines
- Location: Aurora, Philippines
- Nearest city: Santiago
- Coordinates: 16°7′35.4″N 121°53′7.44″E
- Area: 2,266.49 hectares (5,600.6 acres)
- Established: May 22, 1992 (Watershed forest reserve); April 23, 2000 (Protected landscape)
- Governing body: Department of Environment and Natural Resources

The Simbahan–Talagas Protected Landscape is a protected area in northern Aurora, Philippines that preserves a major watershed in the Sierra Madre mountain range of Central Luzon. It contains the headwaters of the Simbahan and Talagas rivers, including the Sangay River and Umihiem Creek in Dinalungan municipality which empty into the Casiguran Sound. A large portion of the park is under forest cover, while the remaining areas are cultivated land, shrubland, grassland, built-up area and river-wash area. Some of the park's fauna include the Philippine deer, Philippine long-tailed macaque, and an abundant species of avifauna. Its location in north central Sierra Madre is covered by dipterocarp forest, composed of Shorea almon (Philippine mahogany), Shorea polysperma (tanguile), Shorea squamata (mayapis), Shorea contorta (white lauan), Shorea negrosensis (red lauan), and Parashorea malaanonan (bagtikan).

First established as a watershed forest reserve in 1992, the 2,266.49-hectare (5,600.6-acre) park was upgraded to a protected landscape area in 2000. It is one of five protected areas in the province of Aurora.
