= Quirino Protected Landscape =

Protected area in Philippines

- IUCN category V (protected landscape/seascape)
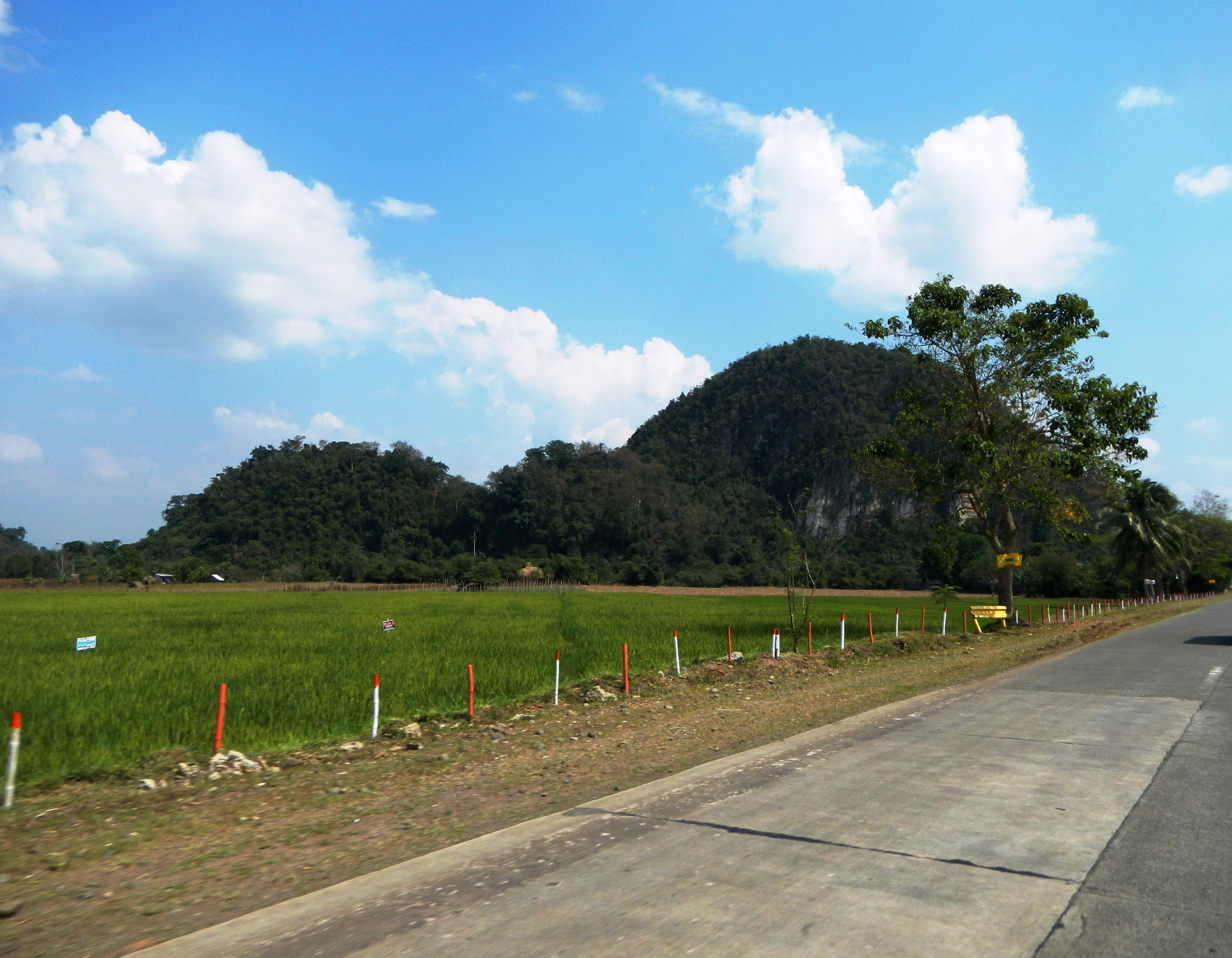
- Nagbukel Mountain in Diffun within the Quirino Protected Landscape

- Location within Philippines
- Location: Quirino, Philippines
- Nearest city: Santiago
- Coordinates: 16°22′38″N 121°46′57″E
- Area: 175,943.62 hectares (434,766.2 acres)
- Established: February 9, 2004
- Governing body: Department of Environment and Natural Resources

The Quirino Protected Landscape is a protected area in the Philippine island of Luzon that covers a large portion of the province of Quirino. It was established in 2004 to preserve the watershed area containing the headwaters of the Cagayan River, also known as the Rio Grande de Cagayan, which supports major irrigation systems in the entire Cagayan Valley region. From an initial area of 206,875.41 hectares (511,200.3 acres), the protected area now forms a total aggregate area of 175,943.62 hectares (434,766.2 acres) divided into three parcels after a 2005 amendment opened up a few areas to mining. It is a key biodiversity area of the Sierra Madre Biodiversity Corridor.

== Geography ==
The Quirino Protected Landscape covers 67% of the total land area of Quirino province. It is located in the Upper Cagayan River Basin in central Sierra Madre and Caraballo ranges and extends into five municipalities of Quirino: Maddela, Nagtipunan, Cabarroguis, Aglipay and Diffun. Rainforests covers most of the area, of which 76% is second growth and 24% is old growth forests. The protected area consists of three major river systems: Upper Cagayan River, Addalam River and Ganano River.

== Biodiversity ==
The protected area is home to a wide array of endemic and endangered flora and fauna. At least 41 threatened animal species have been recorded in the area, including the Cantor's giant softshell turtle. Other animals that inhabit the watershed include bird species such as the Philippine eagle and Isabela oriole, gecko species such as the Sierra Madre fringed gecko, and freshwater fish like the lobed river mullet.

In 2009, a new rafflesia species, the rafflesia aurantia, has also been discovered in the area.
