= Mount Bintuod =

Mountain in Nueva Vizcaya, Philippines

- Location within Luzon Location within Philippines

Highest point
- Elevation: 6,339 ft (1,932 m)
- Prominence: 1,312 ft (400 m)
- Coordinates: 15°58′29″N 121°14′30″E

Geography
- Country: Philippines
- Region: Cagayan Valley
- Province: Nueva Vizcaya
- City/municipality: Alfonso Castañeda
- Parent range: Sierra Madre

Climbing
- First ascent: Unknown

Mount Bintuod or Mount Dalimanoc is a mountain in the Sierra Madre range in the municipality of Alfonso Castañeda in Nueva Vizcaya province. It is probably the highest peak in the Philippines longest mountain range with a first GPS-based measurement of 1,932 metres (6,339 ft) above sea level, from an expedition in April 2012. There are no records of the first ascent, but local tribe people have long established paths.

In some maps this peak is misidentified as Mount Dalimonoc, an actually lower peak adjoining Bintuod to the west.

The forested peak can be reached in a two days one night return hike from Barangay Lipuga, Alfonso Castañeda, Nueva Vizcaya. This rural area of the Philippines is traditional land of the Bugkalot or Ilongot tribe and was only opened to a road via Carranglan, Nueva Ecija in 1997 when a hydropower dam was constructed in the Casignan River of the same valley.

== See also ==
- List of mountains in the Philippines
- List of Southeast Asian mountains
