= Rafflesia aurantia =

Scientific classification
- Kingdom: Plantae
- Clade: Embryophytes
- Clade: Tracheophytes
- Clade: Spermatophytes
- Clade: Angiosperms
- Clade: Eudicots
- Clade: Rosids
- Order: Malpighiales
- Family: Rafflesiaceae
- Genus: Rafflesia
- Species: R. aurantia

Binomial name
- Rafflesia aurantia Barcelona, Co & Balete

Species of flowering plant

Rafflesia aurantia is a member of the genus Rafflesia. It is a parasitic flowering plant endemic to Luzon Island, Philippines in the Quirino Protected Landscape. See original publication and a review of Philippine Rafflesia.
