= Casecnan Protected Landscape =

Protected area in the Philippines

- IUCN category V (protected landscape/seascape)
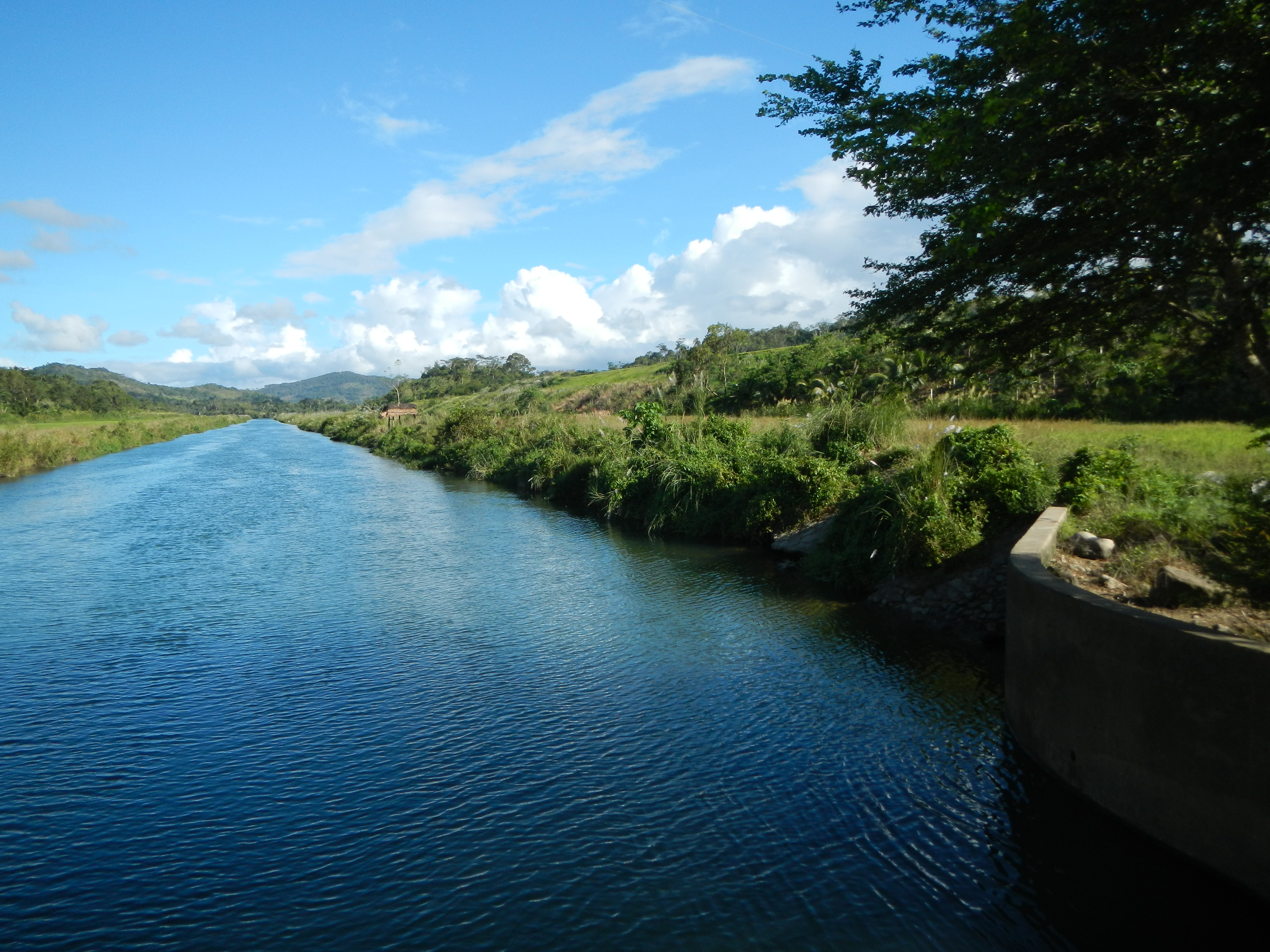
- Casecnan River in Nueva Vizcaya

- Location within Philippines
- Location: Nueva Vizcaya, Quirino and Aurora, Philippines
- Nearest city: San Jose, Nueva Ecija
- Coordinates: 16°1′59″N 121°26′57″E
- Area: 88,846.80 hectares (219,545.2 acres)
- Established: August 11, 1987 (Watershed forest reserve); April 23, 2000 (Protected landscape)
- Governing body: Department of Environment and Natural Resources

The Casecnan Protected Landscape is a protected area in the Casecnan River watershed of eastern Luzon in the Philippines. It has a total area of 88,846.80 hectares (219,545.2 acres) straddling the provinces of Nueva Vizcaya, Quirino and Aurora. The 57,930-hectare (143,100-acre) Casecnan River Watershed Forest Reserve was established in August 1987 by virtue of Executive Order No. 136 issued by President Corazon Aquino. In April 2000, the forest reserve was enlarged to 88,846.80 hectares (219,545.2 acres) and was reclassified as a protected landscape area through Proclamation No. 289. It is considered one of the last remaining substantial water sources for the region of Central Luzon.

== Description ==
The protected landscape area stretches over the municipalities of Dupax del Norte and Dupax del Sur in Nueva Vizcaya, Maddela in Quirino, and Dipaculao in Aurora. It was established to protect the watershed around the Casecnan River, a tributary of the Rio Grande de Cagayan which flows through the mountains of central Sierra Madre, the Caraballo and Mamparang ranges. The river is used heavily for irrigation and serves much of the surrounding communities in Central Luzon and Cagayan Valley. It also supplies hydroelectric power to the region, an additional 140 megawatts of power capacity to the Luzon grid through a tunnel and powerhouse built in 2001 from the diversion weirs in the Casecnan and Taan rivers in Nueva Vizcaya near Mount Guiwan to the Pantabangan Dam in Nueva Ecija. The Casecnan Dam is considered one of the most expensive hydroelectric plants in the country and was criticized for its adverse impact on the ecology of the protected area as well as the local community of Ilongot people (also known as Bugkalot) residing in the watershed area.

On June 22, 2018, the feature was designated a national park through the Expanded National Integrated Protected Areas System (ENIPAS) Act or Republic Act No. 11038 which was signed by President Rodrigo Duterte.

== Wildlife ==
The Casecnan Protected Landscape area is a haven for wildlife, some of which are unique and endangered, including the Philippine deer, Philippine eagle, cloud rat, hornbill, kingfisher and Philippine warty pig.

== See also ==
- Salinas Natural Monument
- Aurora Memorial National Park
