= Dinalungan =

Municipality in Aurora, Philippines

- Municipality
- Municipality of Dinalungan
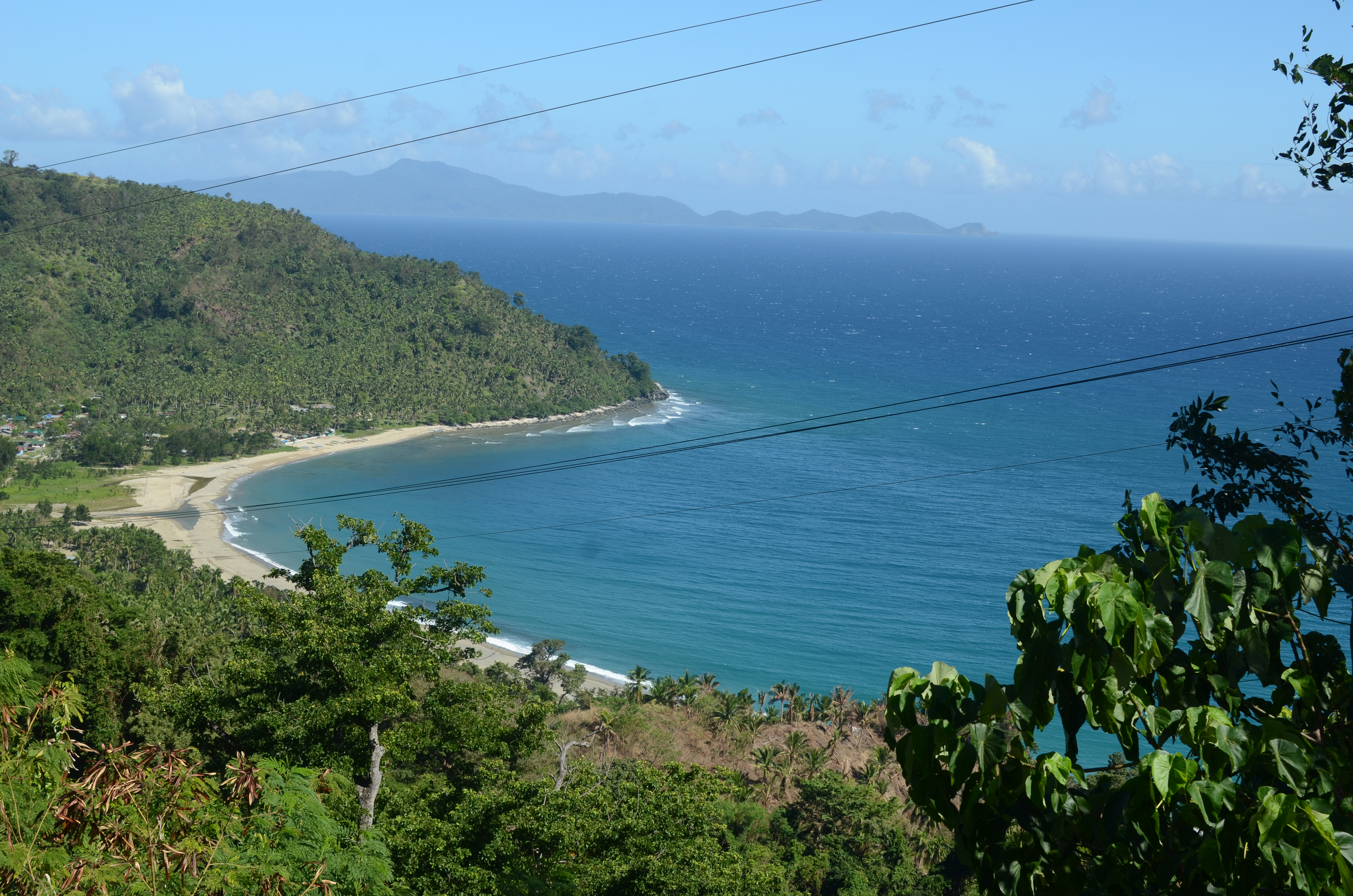
- Ditawini beach

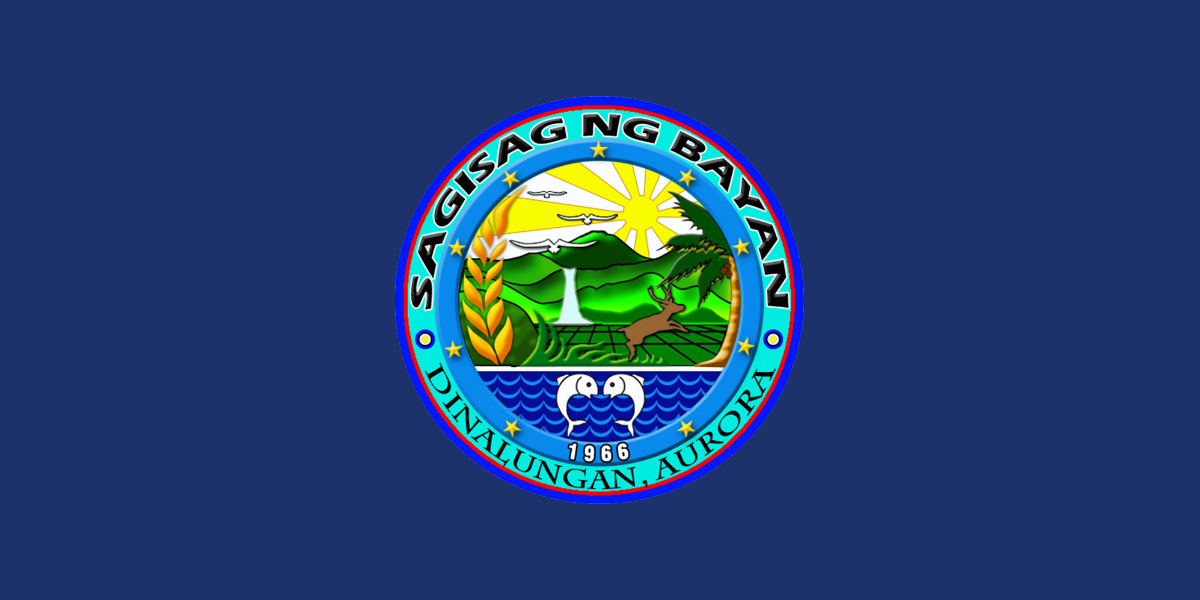
- Flag

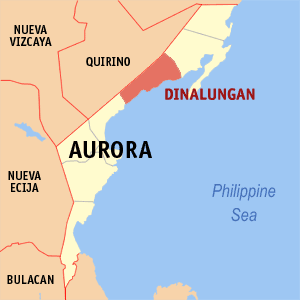
- Map of Aurora with Dinalungan highlighted
- Interactive map of Dinalungan
- Location within the Philippines
- Coordinates: 16°06′N 121°46′E
- Country: Philippines
- Region: Central Luzon
- Province: Aurora
- District: Lone district
- Founded: June 18, 1966
- Barangays: 9 (see Barangays)

Government
  - Type: Sangguniang Bayan
  - Mayor: Manuel A. Torres
  - Vice Mayor: Tito T. Tubigan
  - Representative: Rommel Rico T. Angara
  - Municipal Council: Members: Lorna G. Rada; Arvee A. Vargas; Zarah Ian U. Comabig; Ray John R. Marcos; Pastor S. Flores Jr.; Ladie V. de Guzman; Renato D. Dizon; Joseph E. Soriao
  - Electorate: 9,270 voters (2025)

Area
  - Total: 316.85 km^{2} (122.34 sq mi)
- Elevation: 44 m (144 ft)
- Highest elevation: 491 m (1,611 ft)
- Lowest elevation: 0 m (0 ft)

Population (2024 census)
  - Total: 12,552
  - Density: 39.615/km^{2} (102.60/sq mi)
  - Households: 3,116

Economy
  - Income class: 3rd municipal income class
  - Poverty incidence: 14.07% (2023)
  - Revenue: ₱ 165.3 million (2024)
  - Assets: ₱ 304.5 million (2024)
  - Expenditure: ₱ 160.6 million (2024)
  - Liabilities: ₱ 32.67 million (2024)

Service provider
  - Electricity: Aurora Electric Cooperative (AURELCO)
- Time zone: UTC+8 (PST)
- ZIP code: 3206
- PSGC: 0307704000
- IDD : area code: +63 (0)42
- Native languages: Tagalog; Ilocano
- Website: www.dinalungan.net

Dinalungan, officially the Municipality of Dinalungan (Tagalog/Kasiguranin: Bayan ng Dinalungan; Ilocano: Ili ti Dinalungan), is a municipality in the province of Aurora, Philippines. According to the 2024 census, it has a population of 12,552 people, making it the least populated municipality in the province.

Two protected areas, the Talaytay Protected Landscape and the Simbahan-Talagas Protected Landscape, are located in the municipality.

== History ==
Dinalungan traces its roots as a barrio that was part of Casiguran, which experienced numerous provincial transfers since the Spanish colonial period. The area was annexed by Nueva Ecija in 1818 and was later made part of Nueva Vizcaya in 1839. It then belonged to the El Príncipe District of Nueva Ecija beginning in 1856. During the American occupation, Casiguran became part of Tayabas (now Quezon) in 1902, briefly merging with Baler from 1906 to 1907. Though it was transferred back to Nueva Vizcaya in 1918, Casiguran was ultimately returned to Tayabas in 1946.

On June 18, 1966, barrios Simbahan and Dinalongan and sitios Abuleg, Bungo, Balante, and Nipoo were separated from Casiguran to form the new municipal district of Dinalungan (Dinalongan), by virtue of Republic Act No. 4757. Barrio Dinalongan was designated as the seat of municipal government. The first set of local officials were elected in the 1969 elections. At the time of its creation, Dinalungan was part of the province of Quezon under its sub-province of Aurora until the latter was converted into a province on August 13, 1979.

With only a year left in his last constitutionally allowed term as president, Ferdinand Marcos placed the Philippines under Martial Law in September 1972 and thus retained the position for fourteen more years. This period in Philippine history is remembered for the Marcos administration's human rights abuses, particularly targeting political opponents, student activists, journalists, religious workers, farmers, and others who fought against the Marcos dictatorship. In Dinalungan during the early 1980s, things took a particularly violent turn after farmers organized a rally against a landowner who attempted to claim their farms, seeking help and support from the nuns at the Carmelite mission that had been established there. However, the military accused the Carmelites of working with the New People's Army (NPA), and even hunted down the convent's caretaker and one of the church workers. Young men started disappearing from the farms, and rumors begun to spread that they had become victims of extrajudicial killings by Marcos' forces. Some of Dinalungan's male population opted to join the anti-Marcos resistance at this time, rather than be killed without having done anything.

== Geography ==
According to the Philippine Statistics Authority, the municipality has a land area of 316.85 square kilometers (122.34 sq mi), constituting 10.07% of the 3,147.32-square-kilometer- (1,215.19 sq mi) total area of Aurora.

Dinalungan is situated 87.76 kilometers (54.53 mi) from the provincial capital Baler, and 340.07 kilometers (211.31 mi) from the country's capital city of Manila.

=== Barangays ===
Dinalungan is politically subdivided into 9 barangays, as shown in the matrix below. Each barangay consists of puroks and some have sitios.

PSGC	Barangay	Population			±% p.a.	
		2024		2010		
037704001	Abuleg	9.8%	1,236	1,190	▴	0.26%
037704002	Zone I (Poblacion)	15.0%	1,881	1,866	▴	0.06%
037704003	Zone II (Poblacion)	13.3%	1,666	1,653	▴	0.05%
037704004	Nipoo (Bulo)	7.2%	905	896	▴	0.07%
037704005	Dibaraybay	10.3%	1,292	1,283	▴	0.05%
037704006	Ditawini	5.3%	659	686	▾	−0.28%
037704007	Mapalad	6.1%	763	812	▾	−0.43%
037704008	Paleg	9.6%	1,203	971	▴	1.50%
037704009	Simbahan	13.7%	1,717	1,631	▴	0.36%
	Total		12,552	10,988	▴	0.93%

=== Climate ===
Climate data for Dinalungan, Aurora
Month	Jan	Feb	Mar	Apr	May	Jun	Jul	Aug	Sep	Oct	Nov	Dec	Year
Mean daily maximum °C (°F)	26 (79)	27 (81)	28 (82)	31 (88)	31 (88)	31 (88)	30 (86)	30 (86)	30 (86)	29 (84)	28 (82)	26 (79)	29 (84)
Mean daily minimum °C (°F)	20 (68)	21 (70)	22 (72)	23 (73)	24 (75)	25 (77)	25 (77)	25 (77)	24 (75)	23 (73)	22 (72)	21 (70)	23 (73)
Average precipitation mm (inches)	67 (2.6)	54 (2.1)	51 (2.0)	50 (2.0)	135 (5.3)	166 (6.5)	199 (7.8)	191 (7.5)	188 (7.4)	157 (6.2)	102 (4.0)	104 (4.1)	1,464 (57.5)
Average rainy days	17.0	13.9	14.6	13.7	20.9	22.4	25.8	26.0	24.9	19.3	15.7	16.6	230.8
Source: Meteoblue (modeled/calculated data, not measured locally)

== Demographics ==
Population census of Dinalungan
Year	Pop.	±% p.a.
1970	4,577	—
1975	3,718	−4.08%
1980	5,242	+7.11%
1990	6,770	+2.59%
1995	8,187	+3.63%
2000	9,711	+3.73%
2007	10,145	+0.60%
2010	10,988	+2.95%
2015	11,322	+0.57%
2020	12,508	+2.12%
2024	12,552	+0.08%
Source: Philippine Statistics Authority

In the 2024 census, Dinalungan had a population of 12,552 people. The population density was 40 inhabitants per square kilometer (100/sq mi).

== Economy ==
Poverty incidence of Dinalungan (%)

Source: Philippine Statistics Authority

== Education ==
The Dinalungan Schools District Office governs all educational institutions within the municipality. It oversees the management and operations of all private and public, from primary to secondary schools.

=== Primary and elementary schools ===
- Abuleg Elementary School
- Dibaraybay Elementary School
- Dinalungan Adventist Elementary School
- Dinalungan Central School
- Ditawini Elementary School
- Emeterio Inocillas Elementary School
- Mapalad Elementary School
- Mount Carmel School of Dinalungan
- Paleg Elementary School
- Paulino L. Bautista Elementary School

=== Secondary schools ===
- Juan C. Angara Memorial National High School
- Mariano D. Marquez Memorial National High School
