= Sierra Madre (Philippines) =

Mountain range in Luzon, Philippines

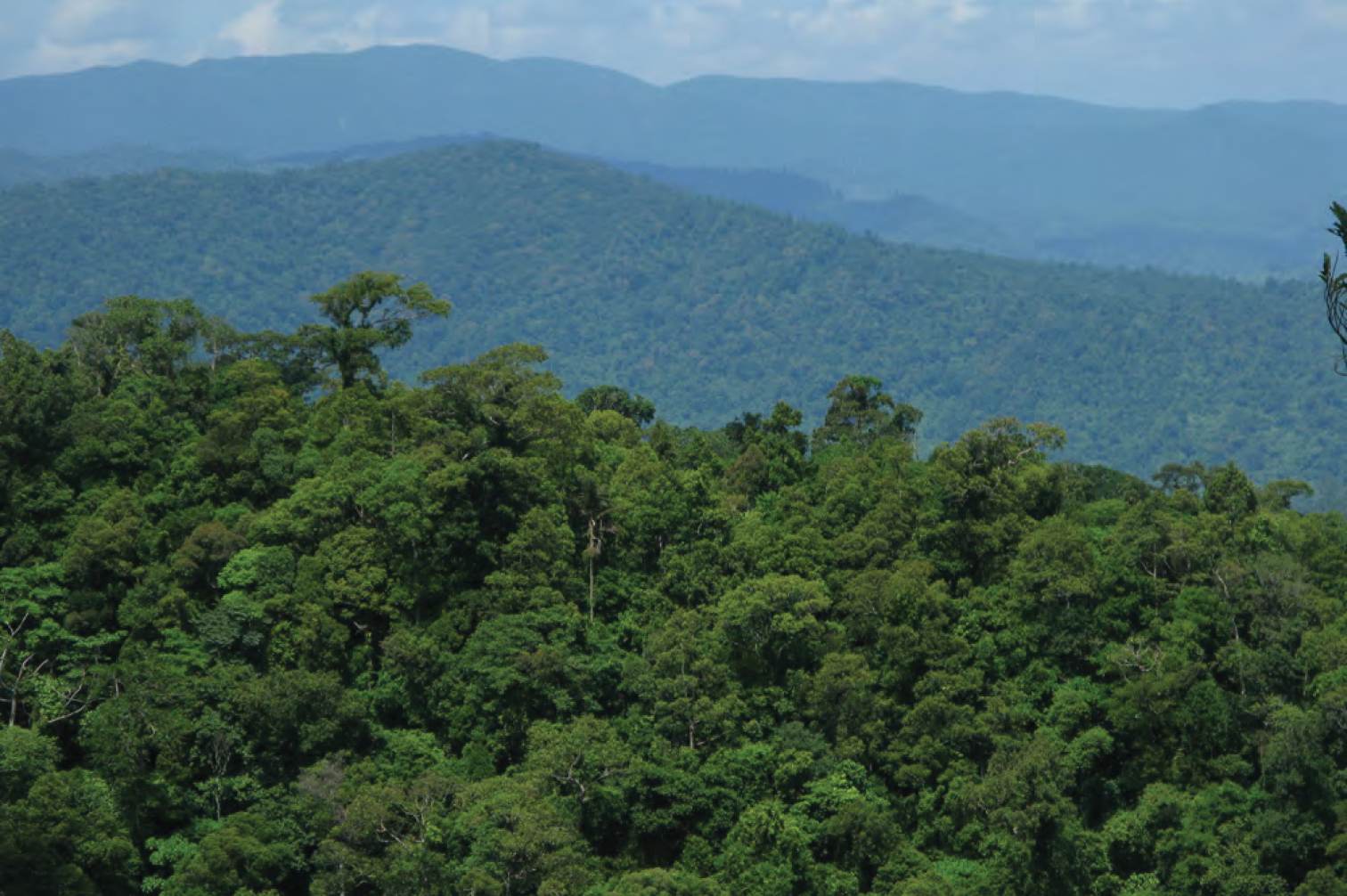
- View south of the northern Sierra Madre from the peak of Mount Cagua in Cagayan

Highest point
- Peak: Mount Guiwan
- Elevation: 1,950 m (6,400 ft)

Dimensions
- Length: 540 km (340 mi) North to south
- Width: 56 km (35 mi) east to west
- Area: 16,260 km^{2} (6,280 mi^{2})

Geography
- Location within Philippines
- Country: Philippines
- Province: Aurora; Bulacan; Cagayan; Isabela; Laguna; Nueva Ecija; Nueva Vizcaya; Quezon; Quirino; Rizal
- Region: Cagayan Valley; Calabarzon; Central Luzon
- Range coordinates: 16°3′N 121°35′E
- Borders on: Pacific Ocean

The Sierra Madre is the longest mountain range in the Philippines. Spanning over 540 kilometers (340 mi), it runs from the province of Cagayan down to the province of Quezon in a north-south direction on the eastern portion of Luzon, the largest island of the archipelago. It is bordered by the Pacific Ocean to the east, Cagayan Valley to the northwest, Central Luzon to the midwest, and Calabarzon to the southwest. Some communities east of the mountain range, along the coast, are less developed and so remote that they can only be accessed by taking a plane or a boat.

The country's largest protected area, the Northern Sierra Madre Natural Park, is situated at the northern part of the range in the province of Isabela. The park is in the UNESCO tentative list for World Heritage List inscription. Environmentalists, scholars, and scientists have been urging the government to include the other parks within the Sierra Madre mountains for a UNESCO site that would include the whole mountain range from Cagayan province to Quezon province.

== Geography ==
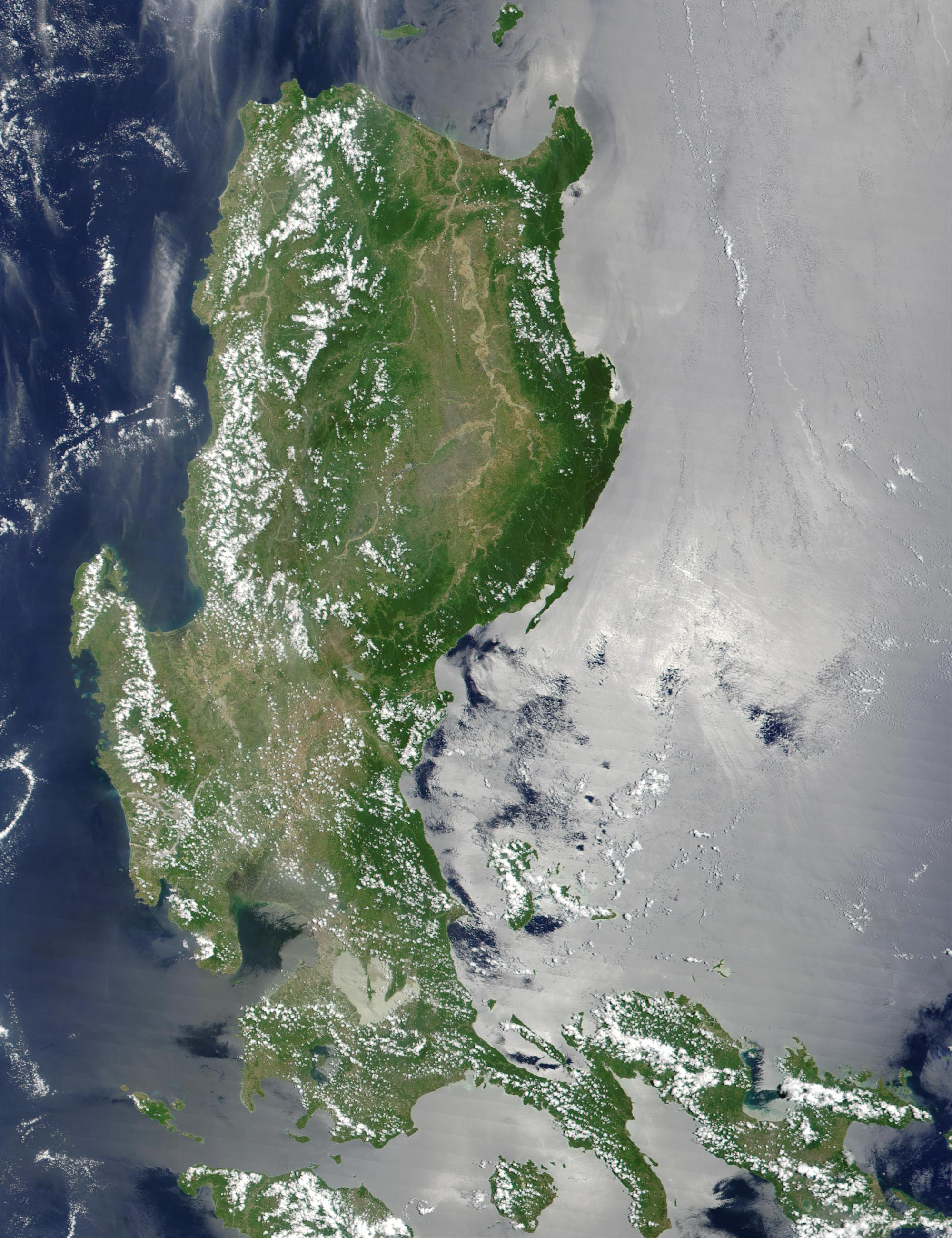
Luzon island satellite image showing the range in dark green

In the north, the range starts in the province of Cagayan and ends in the south in the province of Quezon. In the province of Nueva Vizcaya, the Caraballo Mountains lies between Sierra Madre and Cordillera Central.

The mountain range is widely believed to serve as a typhoon barrier for Luzon. However, it is only truly effective for Cagayan Valley where wind exposure and rainfall brought on by the typhoon are both reduced. For the rest of Luzon along its western slopes such as in Metro Manila, rainfall is actually enhanced by orographic lifting.

=== Elevation ===
The range's highest point is unclear, and several peaks are attributed as the highest. Mount Anacuao in Aurora province stands at 6,069 feet (1,850 m), while Mount Cetaceo in Cagayan is of similar altitude. However, an expedition in September and October 2012 to Mount Guiwan (Nueva Vizcaya) preliminarily measured an altitude of 6,283 feet (1,915 m) on the summit.

=== Peaks ===
List of highest peaks along the mountain range by elevation.

- Mount Guiwan – 6,400 ft (2,000 m)
- Mount Bintuod – 6,339 ft (1,932 m)
- Mount Mingan – 6,191 ft (1,887 m)
- Mount Anacuao – 6,014 ft (1,833 m)
- Mount Cetaceo – 5,981 ft (1,823 m)
- Mount Dos Cuernos – 5,856 ft (1,785 m)
- Salakot Peak – 5,699 ft (1,737 m)
- Mount Cresta – 5,062 ft (1,543 m)
- Mount San Cristobal – 4,882 ft (1,488 m)
- Mount Otunao – 4,803 ft (1,464 m)
- Mount Irid – 4,751 ft (1,448 m)
- Mount Batay – 4,596 ft (1,401 m)
- Mount Dos Hermanos – 4,557 ft (1,389 m)
- Mount Minalunad – 4,419 ft (1,347 m)
- Mount Oriod – 3,957 ft (1,206 m)
- Mount Palanan – 3,921 ft (1,195 m)
- Mount Cagua – 3,717 ft (1,133 m)
- Mount Etnora – 3,671 ft (1,119 m)
- Mount Lubog – 3,133 ft (955 m)
- Mount Sumag – 2,759 ft (841 m)
- Mount Batolusong – 2,559 ft (780 m)
- Mount Mapalad – 2,461 ft (750 m)
- Mount Daraitan – 2,425 ft (739 m)
- Mount Maynoba – 2,388 ft (728 m)
- Mount Masungki – 2,165 ft (660 m)
- Mount Binutasan – 1,844 ft (562 m)
- Mount Malauban – 1,024 ft (312 m)

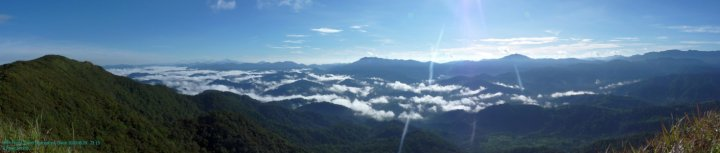
The mountains as viewed near summit of the Mount Oriod in Bulacan

=== Rivers ===
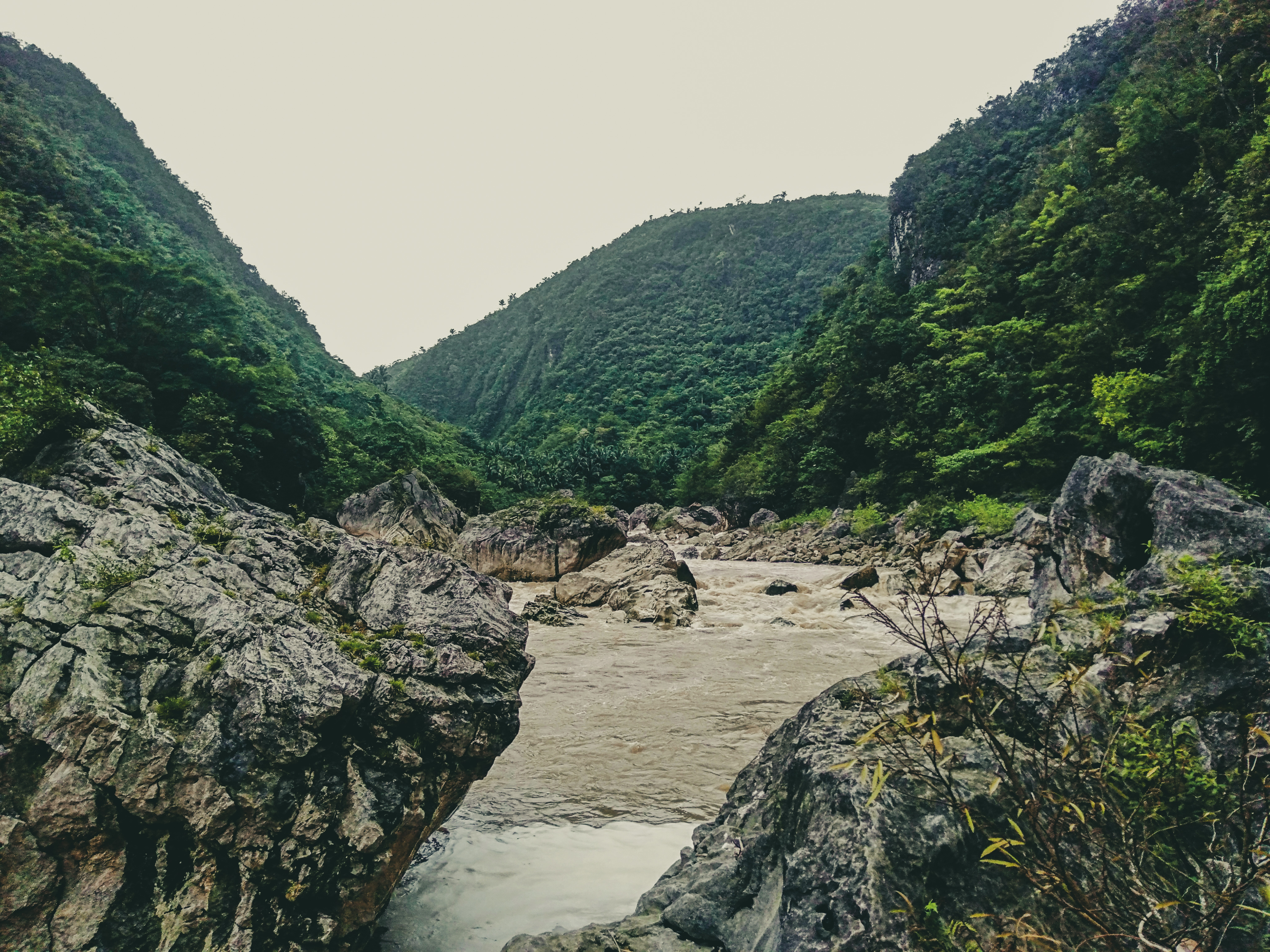
Tinipak or Agos River in Tanay, Rizal

List of major rivers along the mountain range by length.

- Cagayan River – 518 km (322 miles)
- Pampanga River – 270 km (170 miles)
- Ilagan River – 189 km (117 miles)
- Angat River – 153 km (95 miles)
- Agos River – 93.8 km (58.3 miles)
- Pinacanauan River – 82.6 km (51.3 miles)
- Umiray River – 80.6 km (50.1 miles)
- Palanan River – 79 km (49 miles)
- Marikina River – 78 km (48 miles)
- Abuan River – 70 km (43 miles)
- Aguang River – 52 km (32 miles)
- Kaliwa River – 31.3 km (19.4 miles)

=== Waterfalls ===
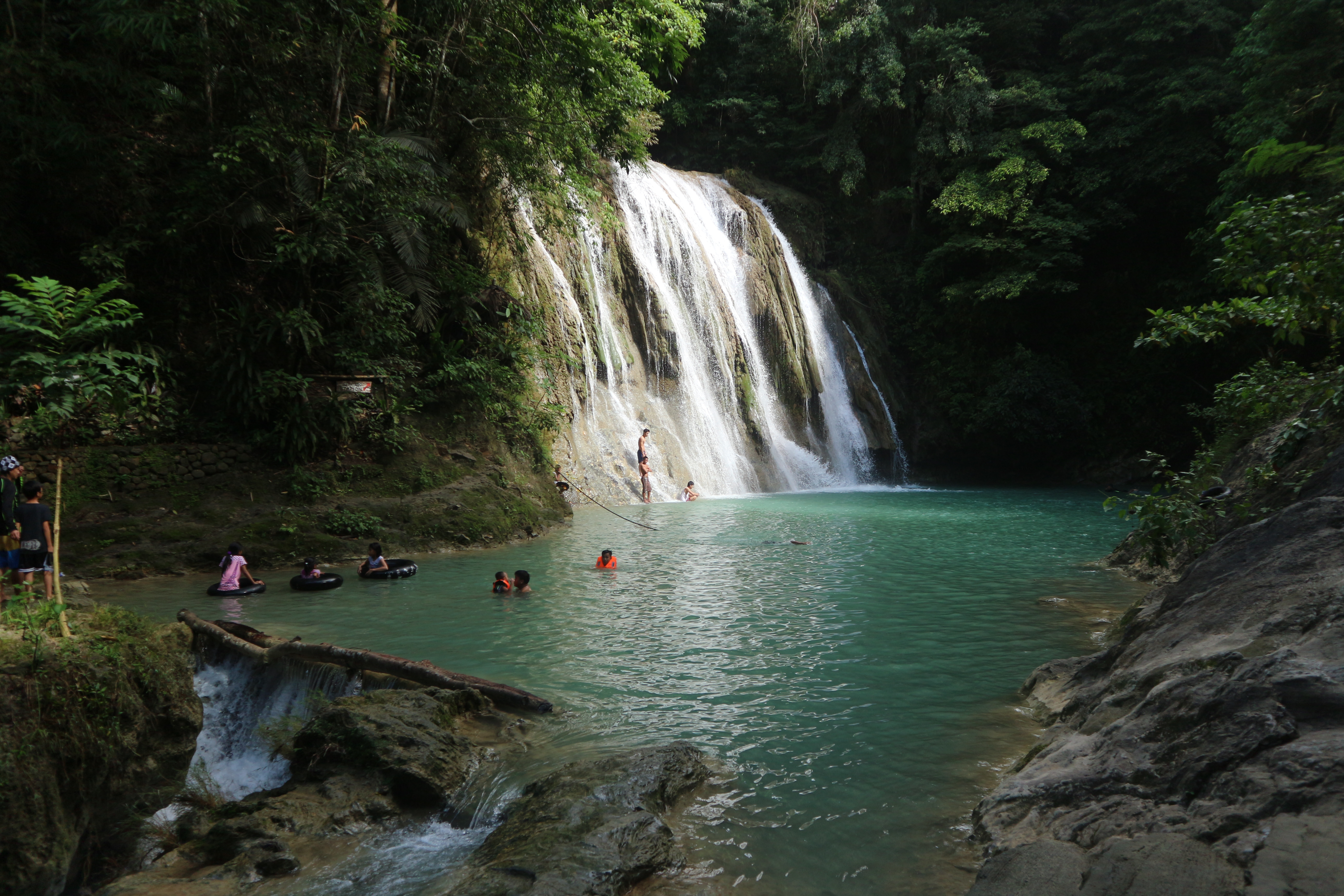
Daranak Falls in Tanay, Rizal

- Daranak Falls, Tanay
- Eva Falls, Doña Remedios Trinidad
- Lucab Falls, Doña Remedios Trinidad
- Secret Falls, Doña Remedios Trinidad
- Talon Pari Falls, Doña Remedios Trinidad
- Talon Pedro Falls, Doña Remedios Trinidad
- 13th Falls, Doña Remedios Trinidad
- Verdivia Falls, Doña Remedios Trinidad
- Zamora Falls, Doña Remedios Trinidad
- Ditumabo Mother Falls, San Luis, Aurora

=== Ecoregions ===
Two ecoregions cover the Sierra Madre. The Luzon rain forests cover the lower slopes of the range, and are characterized by dipterocarp trees. The Luzon montane rain forests cover the portions of the range above 1,000 meters (3,300 ft) elevation, and are characterized by laurel forests of oak and laurel trees.

=== National parks ===
- Aurora Memorial National Park
- Biak-na-Bato National Park
- Fuyot Springs National Park

=== Other protected areas ===
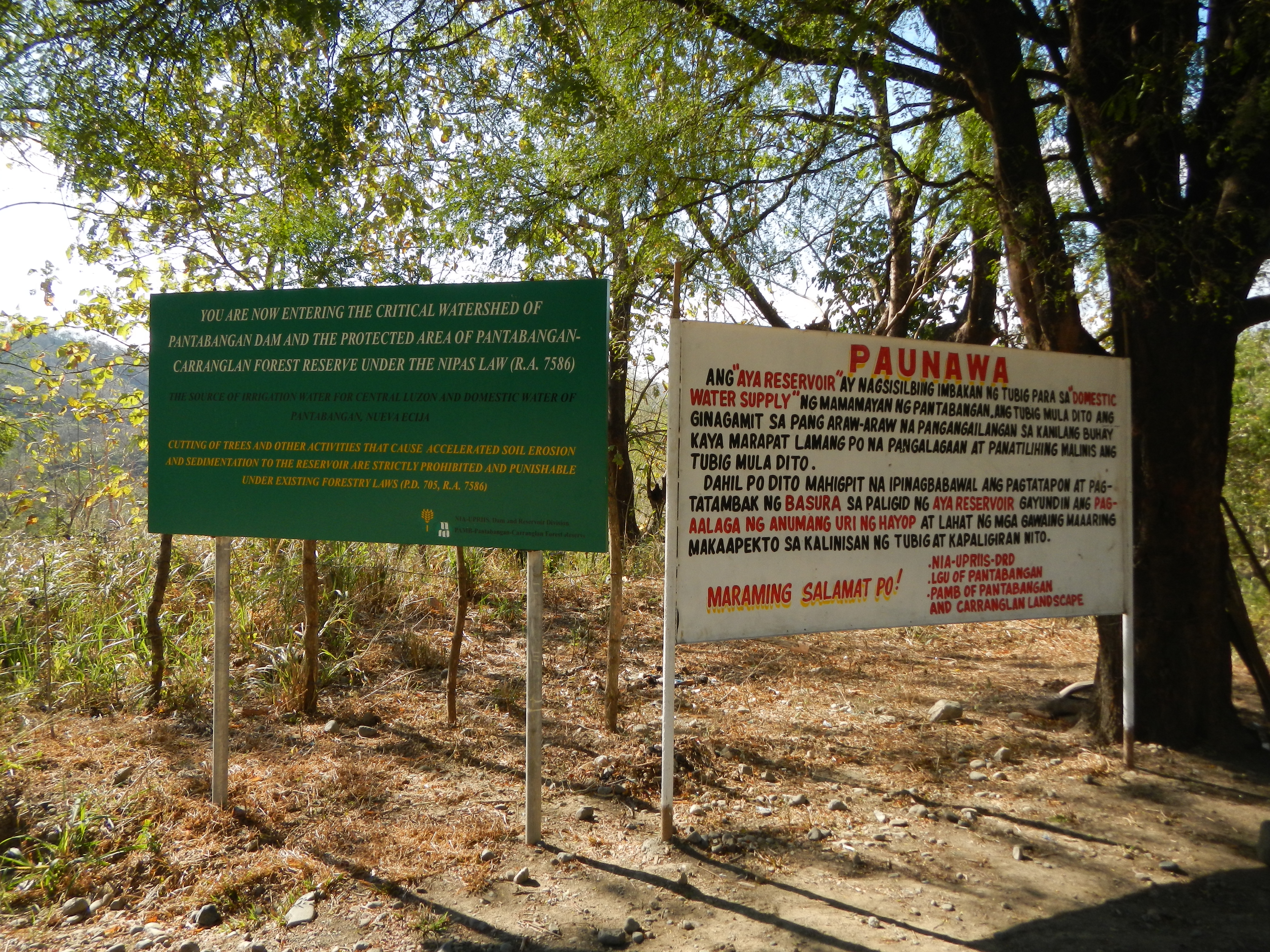
Signage at Pantabangan–Carranglan Watershed Forest Reserve

- Amro River Protected Landscape
- Angat Watershed Forest Reserve
- Casecnan Protected Landscape
- Dinadiawan River Protected Landscape
- La Mesa Watershed Reservation
- Magapit Protected Landscape
- Northern Sierra Madre Natural Park
- Pantabangan–Carranglan Watershed Forest Reserve
- Peñablanca Protected Landscape and Seascape
- Quezon Protected Landscape
- Quirino Protected Landscape
- Simbahan-Talagas Protected Landscape
- Talaytay Protected Landscape
- Upper Marikina River Basin Protected Landscape

=== Active volcanoes ===
- Cagua Volcano, an active volcano in Cagayan province that last erupted in 1907.

=== Indigenous and remote communities ===
==== Indigenous peoples ====
Sierra Madre is home to Indigenous Dumagat-Remontado communities who have ancestral domain claims covering parts of the mountain range.

==== Remote communities ====
Some coastal communities east of the Sierra Madre mountains, especially from Palanan, Isabela heading north to near the northernmost tip of mainland Cagayan, are remote and isolated with no roads connecting them to towns west of the mountain range. Towns like Palanan, Divilacan and Maconacon, Isabela can only be reached by plane from Cauayan or a boat ride from Aurora province, south of Isabela or from Santa Ana, Cagayan, north of the province. Ilagan–Divilacan Road traversing the Sierra Madre mountain is about to be completed.

== Biodiversity ==
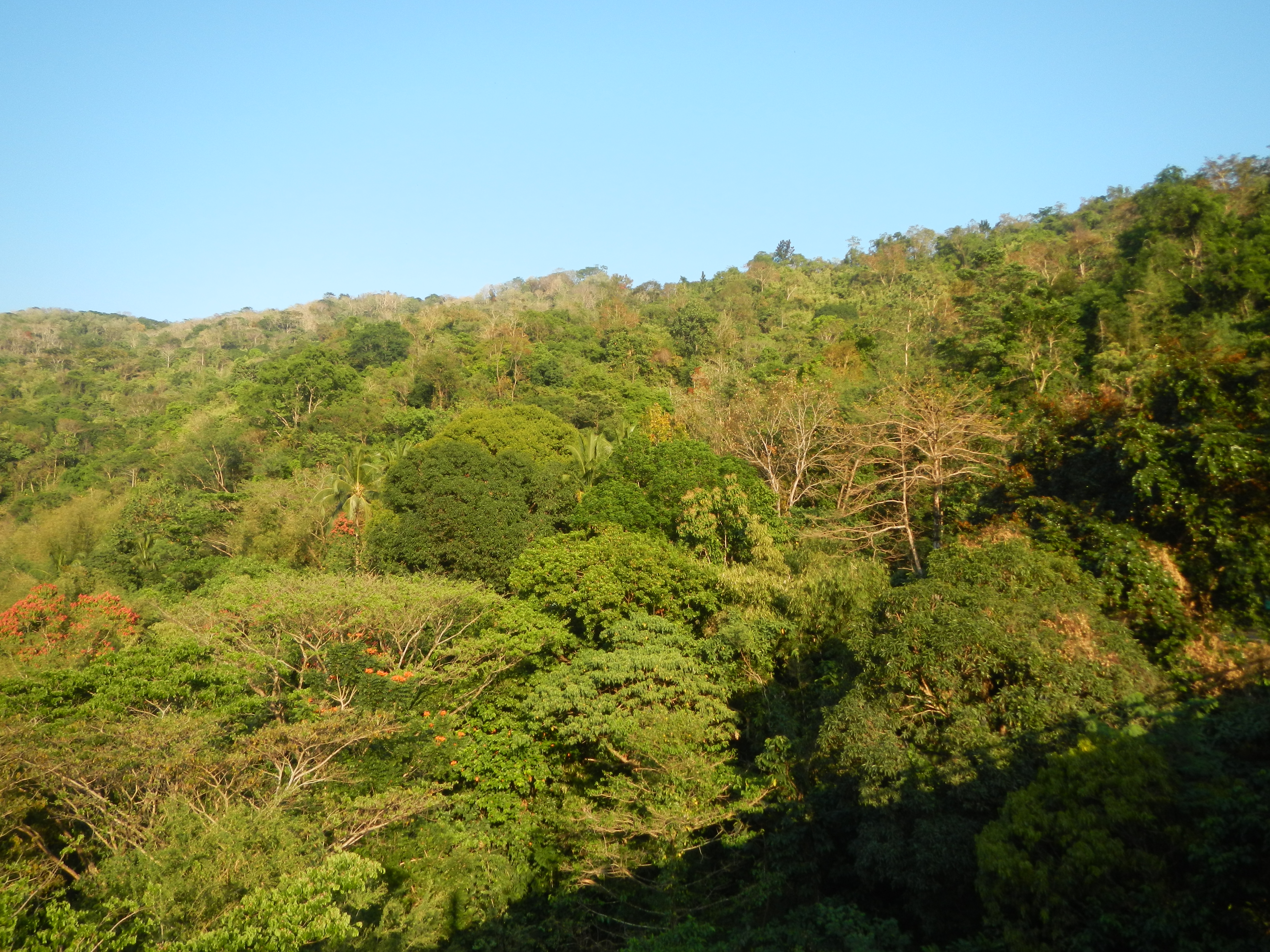
Lush rainforest in Norzagaray, Bulacan

The Sierra Madre mountain range is rich in genetic, species, and habitat diversity, supplying food, water, and shelter to millions of people. The mountain range hosts multiple watersheds and some of the Philippines' oldest forests. These forests are some of the country's largest remaining forest blocks, including an old-growth dipterocarp forest, montane forests, and extensive lowland forests.

Sierra Madre's forests and watersheds are home to some of the country's richest wildlife communities. More than 291 species of birds and 25 endemic mammals may be found within the Northern Sierra Madre Natural Park alone.

=== Endemic flora and fauna ===
Northern Sierra Madre Natural Park, the largest protected area in Sierra Madre range, is home to endemic dipterocarp trees belonging to the Hopea and Shorea genera, orchids such as Dendrobium aclinia, the leguminous tree, Milletia longipes and a member of the citrus family, Swinglea glutinosa as well.

In the forest, in April 2010, the endemic lizard species Northern Sierra Madre Forest monitor lizard – Varanus bitatawa (common name: Butikaw) was described to science, although the Aeta and Ilongot indigenous peoples have known and used it as a food source. The Northern Sierra Madre forest monitor lizard is one of the three frugivorous lizards in the Varanidae family along with V. olivaceus and V. mabitang. All of the three frugivorous lizards are found only in the Philippines.

Endemic mammals in Sierra Madre are the Sierra Madre shrew mouse and Sierra Madre forest mouse.

=== Non-endemic flora and fauna ===
Pterocarpus indicus ("Narra"), the national tree of the Philippines, Agathis dammara ("Almaciga"), and Diospyros blancoi ("Kamagong") can be found on the Sierra Madre range.

Isabela oriole, Philippine eagle, and Philippine crocodile are critically endangered species that can be found in fragmented locations.

== Human activities ==
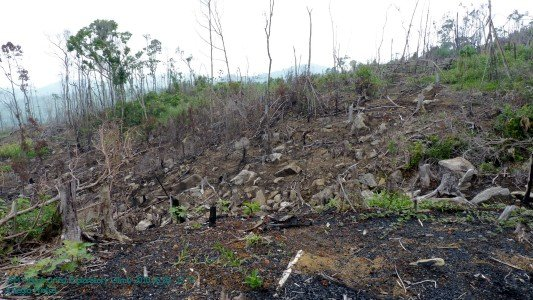
Lower portions of the Sierra Madre, with habitat damage from logging and charcoal-making.

=== Forest-loss due to anthropogenic activities ===
The Sierra Madre mountain range forest habitat is threatened by human activities. Settlers living at the lower portions of the slopes generally are supported by work in logging and charcoal-making. Some portions of the forest cover are already second growth forest. Forest degradation of at least 1,400 hectares (3,500 acres) per year caused by illegal tree cutting, slash-and-burn farming, fuel-wood collection, illegal hunting, and residential expansion.

=== Mining ===
A gold and copper mine in the municipality of Kasibu, Nueva Vizcaya, has been operated by the OceanaGold Corporation, which is based in Australia. The Didipio mine is a large-scale open-pit mine in a remote location, and local residents claim the company has severely damaged both the environment for miles around the site, and suppressed the long-standing farming economy. Oceana continues to assert a right to operate despite the expiration of its permit, and opposition by organized local residents, the Catholic Church, and worldwide environmental groups.

=== Hydropower project ===
The Kaliwa dam project through a project called "New Centennial Water Source" in Sitio Cablao, Brgy. Pagsangahan, General Nakar, Quezon / Sitio Queborosa, Brgy. Magsaysay, Infanta, Quezon is threatening the endangered species living in the sparse remaining forest of Sierra Madre and indigenous people's lives in that area. This project replaced the Kaliwa Low Dam that did not materialize and under the new administration, Rodrigo Duterte approved the Chinese-funded proposal. Aside from the destruction of ecologically important forests, the dam also faces controversy for fulfillment of its financial requirement through a Chinese loan with a 2.0% interest rate rather than a Japanese loan with a 1.25% interest rate. The project continues to face strong opposition from the public yet the government is eager to continue. Construction of Kaliwa dam began in 2022.

=== Conservation efforts ===
The Mabuwaya Foundation is a non-governmental organization that aims to protect and conserve the Philippine crocodiles and other endemic and threatened species. They mainly work in the towns of Divilican and San Mariano in Isabela. The Sierra Madre Biodiversity Corridor Program is described in national biodiversity reporting as an initiative by Conservation International Philippines focused on conserving biodiversity within the corridor.

On June 19, 2012, in light of the onslaught of Tropical Storm Ondoy on September 26, 2009, Philippine president Benigno Aquino III signed Proclamation No. 413, declaring every September 26 as "Save Sierra Madre Day" in an effort to raise awareness on the benefits that the Sierra Madre brings and the risks and dangers of neglecting it. The proclamation also calls "all sectors of society and the government" to join hands in pursuing activities geared toward the conservation of the Sierra Madre, and to plan, prepare, and conduct activities in observance of Save Sierra Madre Day.

== Gallery ==
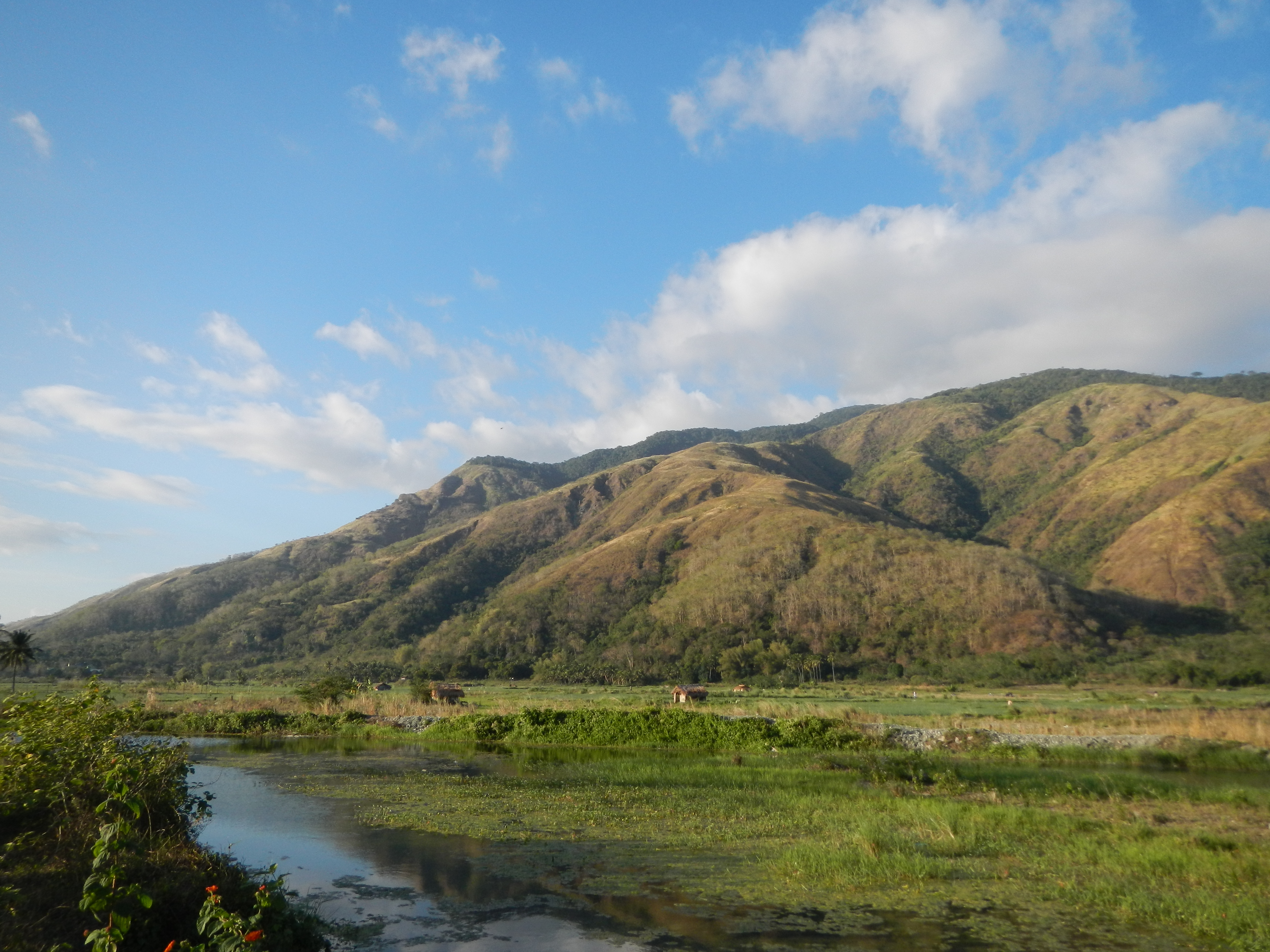
The mountains in Gabaldon

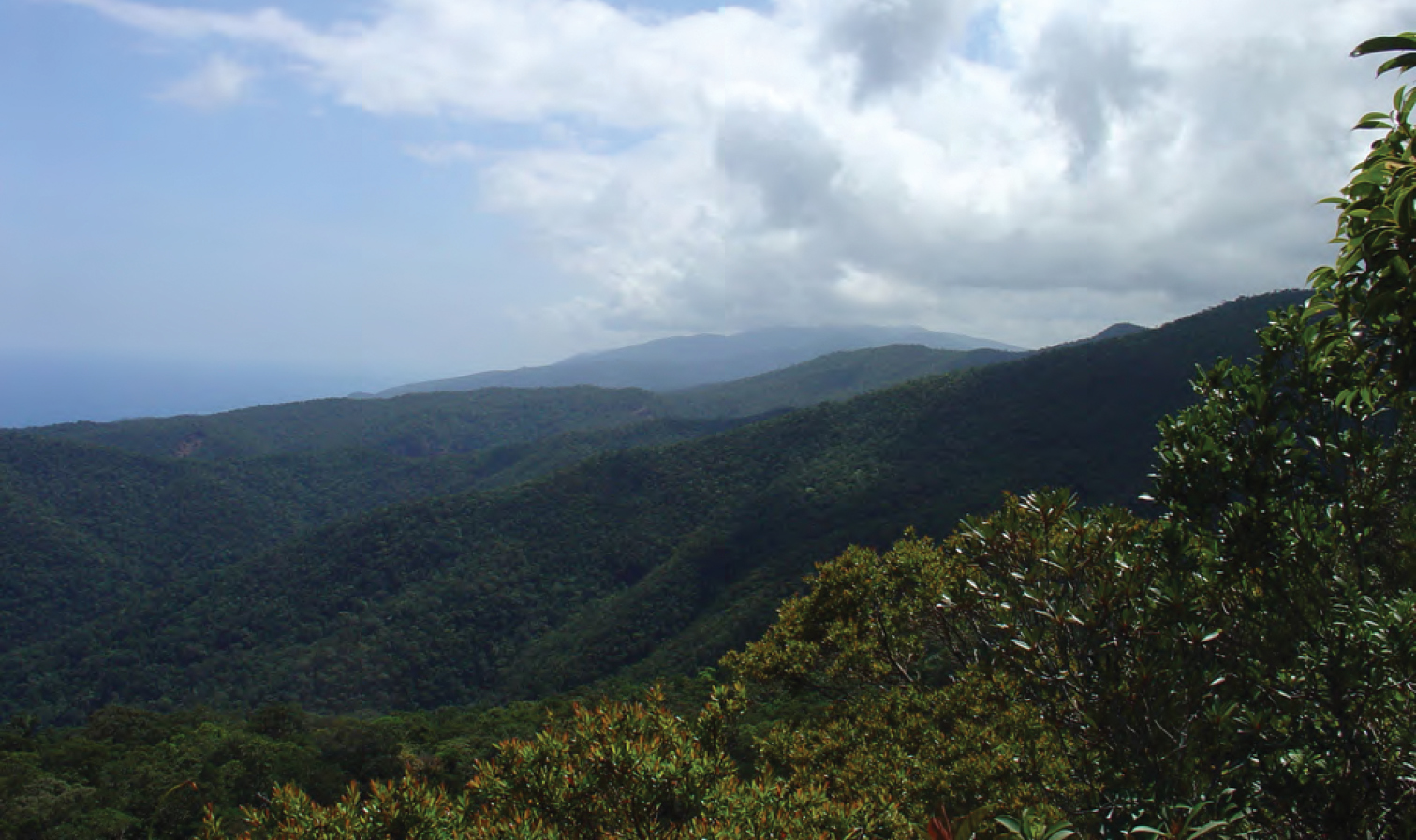
The mountains in Isabela as viewed from Barangay Diddadungan in the town of Palanan

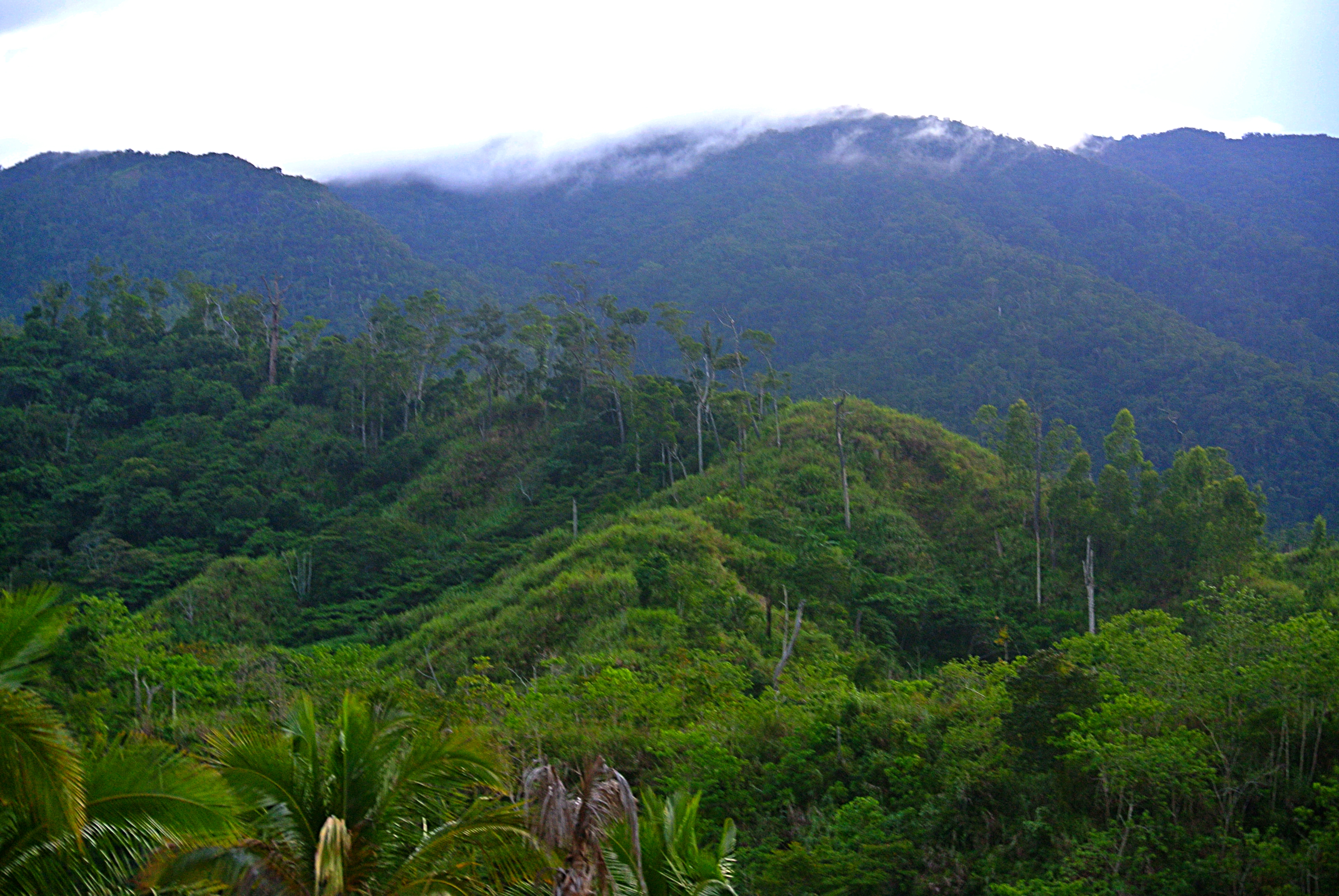
Northern portion of the range

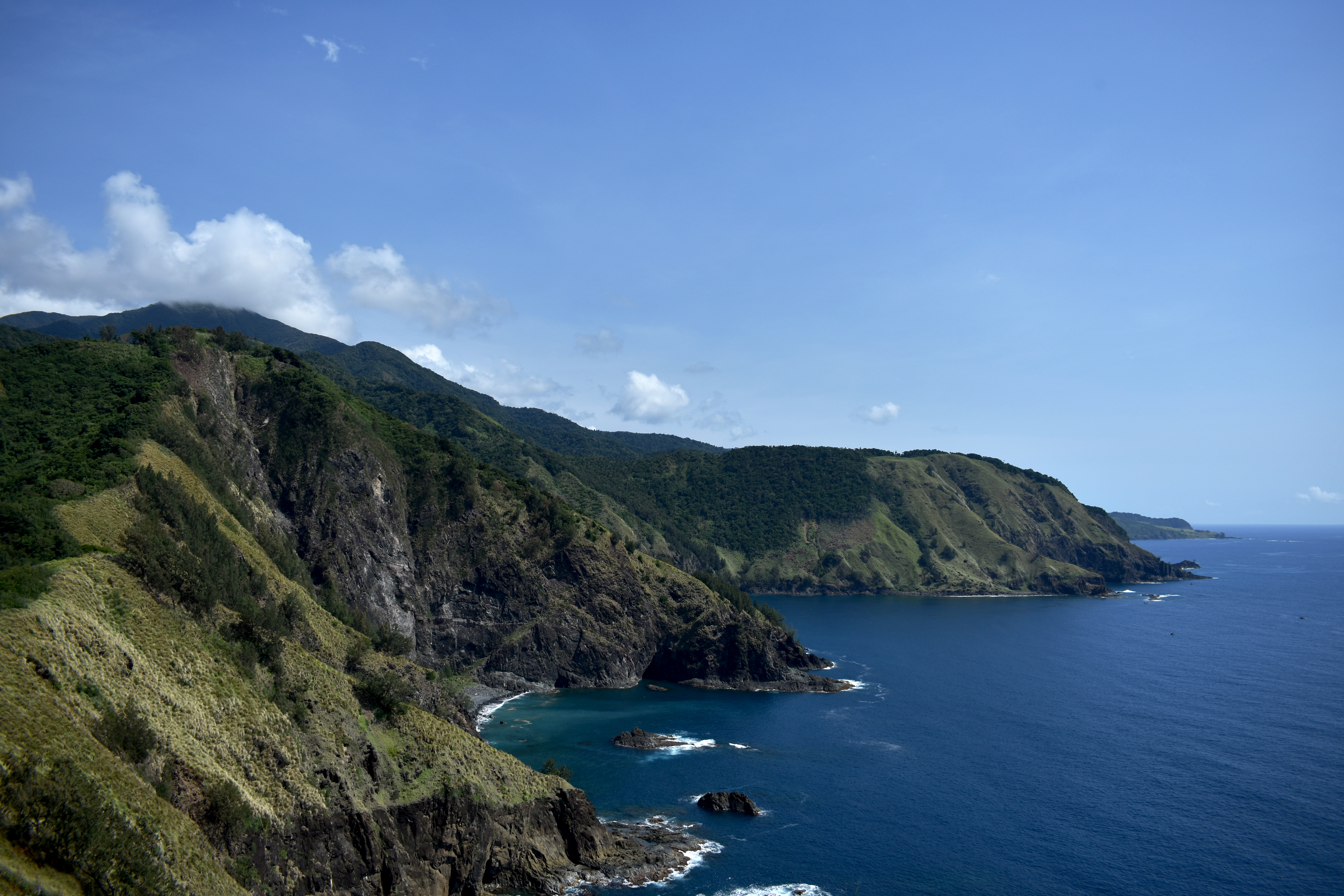
Mountainous coast of Dingalan facing the Philippine Sea

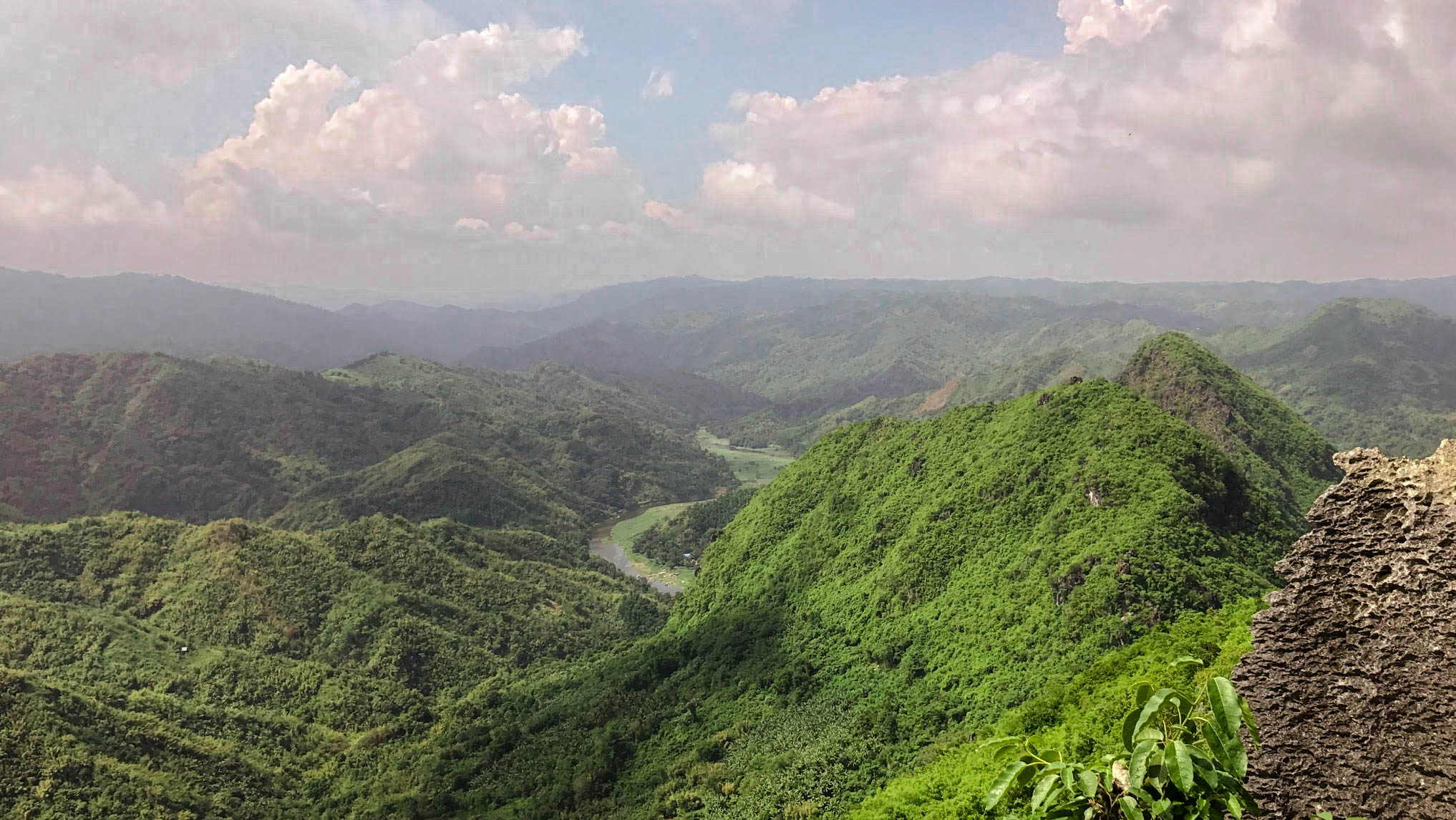
View from Mount Pamitinan summit in Rodriguez

== See also ==
- Geography of the Philippines
- Ecoregions in the Philippines
