= Mount Guiwan =

Mountain in Nueva Vizcaya, Philippines

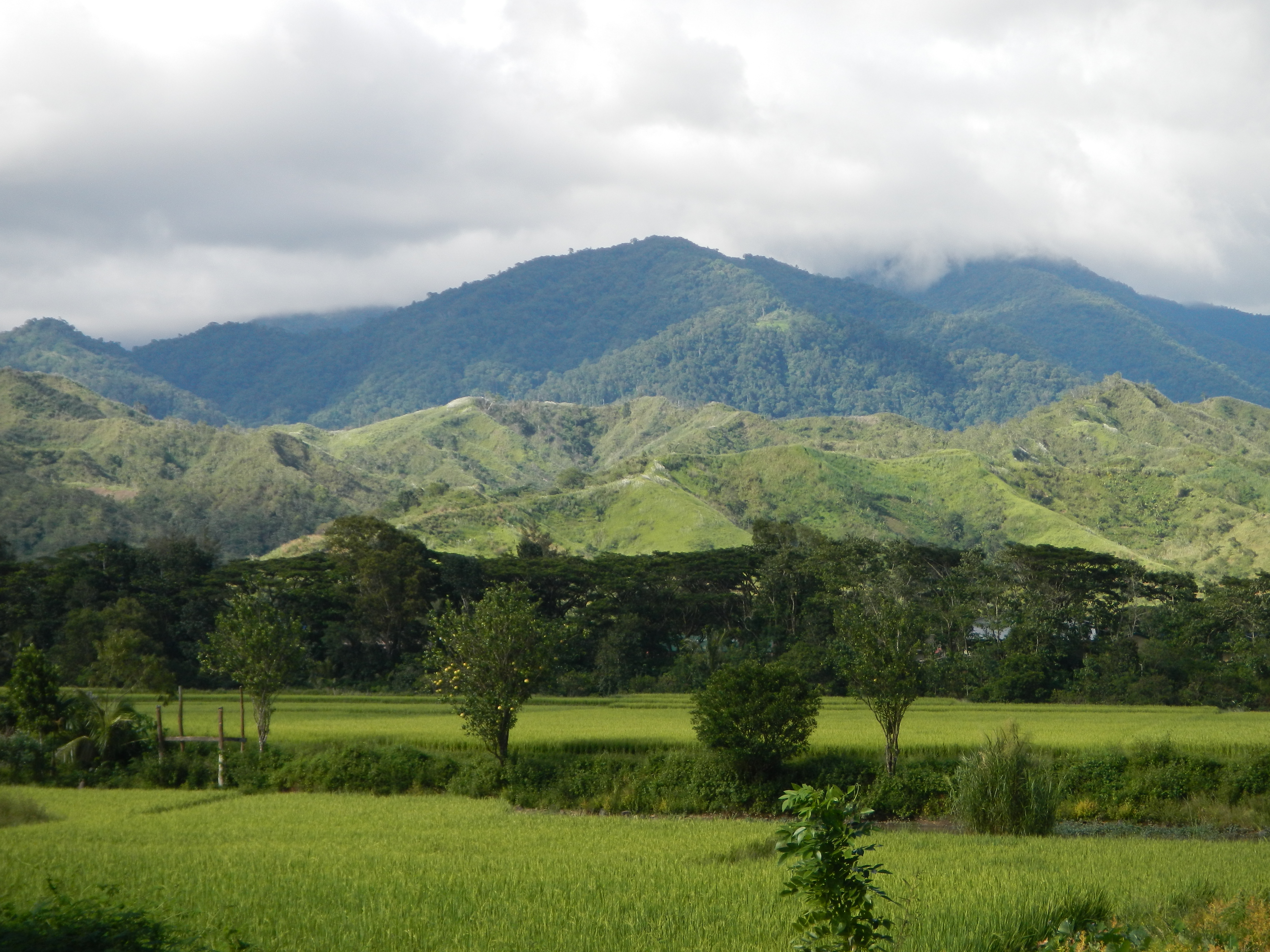
- The mountain as seen from the Alfonso Castañeda municipal hall

Highest point
- Elevation: 1,950 m (6,400 ft)
- Prominence: 1,061 m (3,481 ft)
- Listing: Ribu
- Coordinates: 15°56′43″N 121°17′11″E

Geography
- Location within Luzon Location within Philippines
- Country: Philippines
- Region: Cagayan Valley
- Province: Nueva Vizcaya
- City/municipality: Alfonso Castañeda
- Parent range: Sierra Madre

Mount Guiwan is a mountain in the Sierra Madre range in Alfonso Castañeda, Nueva Vizcaya, Philippines. It is probably the highest peak of the Sierra Madre with a height of at least 1,915 metres (6,283 ft) above sea level according to NAMRIA topographic map and perhaps as high as 1,950 metres (6,400 ft). Bugkalots have long established trails which they use when hunting.

No scientific survey has yet been conducted in the area but recent expedition to the mountain by the Nueva Vizcaya Mountaineering Society, Inc. led by NVMSI Founder Gene Basilio Jr. and President Raymond Zamora in September 2012 proved that civets, monkeys, and other wildlife still thrive in the forests of Mount Guiwan. Its streams still have abundant eels. A waterfalls estimated to be one km long from its first drop down to the bottom flows from near the summit of the mountain.

In October 2012, Basilio and Zamora, with guides from the Bugkalot tribe, returned and successfully summited the mountain passing through a mossy forest and a route they called Zamora trail. It took them three days to hike from the jump-off point in Alfonso Castaneda.

Underneath Mount Guiwan, a tunnel that diverts water from the Casecnan River in Brgy. Pelaway to Pantabangan Dam in Nueva Ecija was constructed by the Casecnan Multi-Purpose Transbasin and Power project contracted by California Energy.

== See also ==
- Casecnan Protected Landscape
