= Caraballo Mountains =

Mountain range in Luzon, Philippines

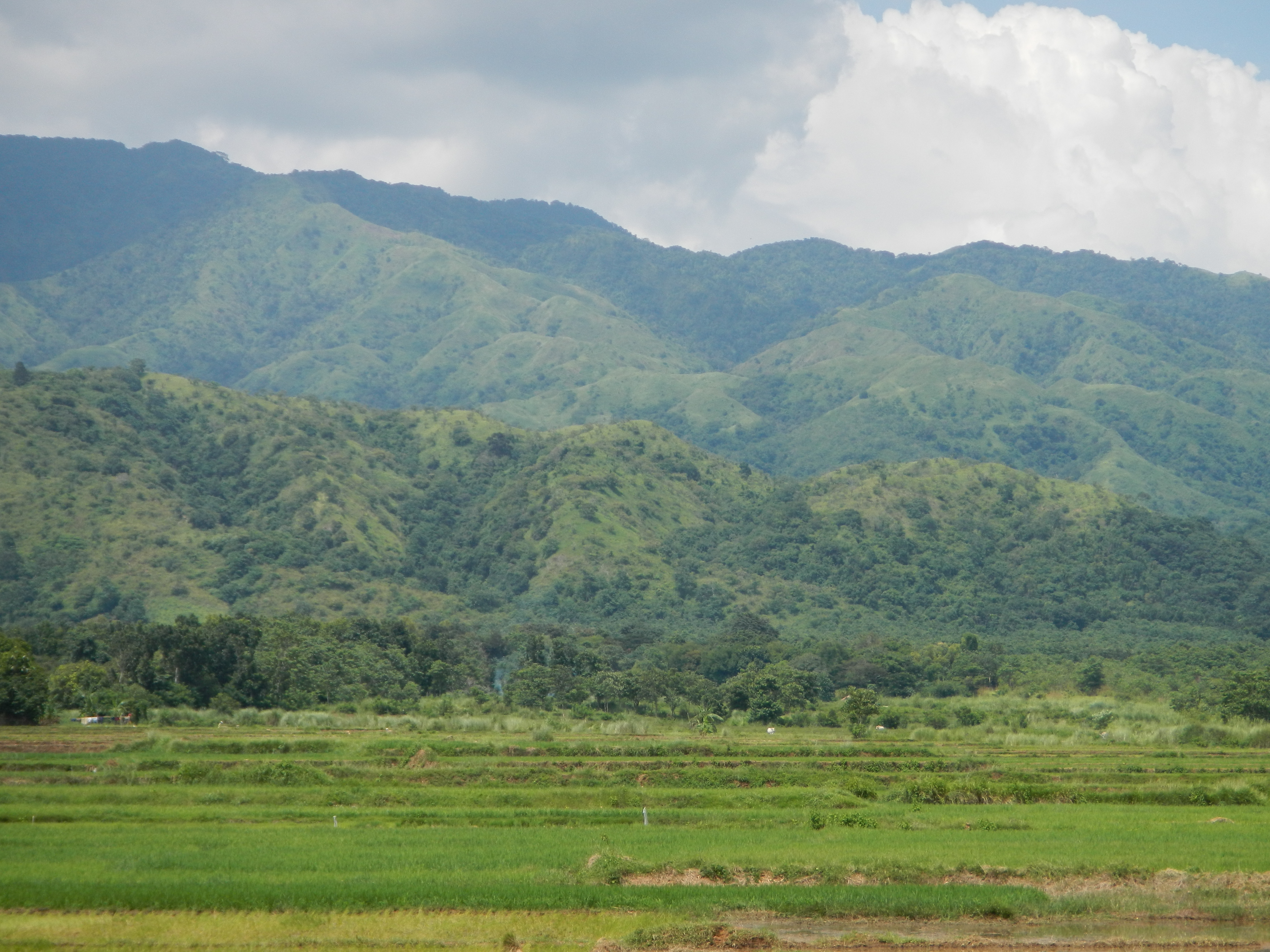
- The mountains as seen from the Umingan-Lupao border

Dimensions
- Length: 54 km (34 mi) north-south
- Width: 15 mi (24 km)
- Area: 1,300 km^{2} (500 mi^{2})

Geography
- Location within Philippines
- Country: Philippines
- Provinces: Nueva Ecija; Nueva Vizcaya; Quirino
- Range coordinates: 16°8′37.8″N 121°10′4.8″E
- Borders on: Cordillera Central; Sierra Madre; Cagayan Valley; Central Luzon

The Caraballo Mountains is a mountain range in the central part of Luzon island in the Philippines, situated between the Cordillera Central and Sierra Madre mountain ranges. The mountains serve as the location of the river source of the Cagayan River, the longest in the country. The mountains mark the boundary between the Philippine Plate and the Sunda Plate.

Several portions of the mountain range are protected under the National Integrated Protected Areas System, including the Casecnan Protected Landscape and the Pantabangan–Carranglan Watershed Forest Reserve.

== Transportation ==
The Caraballo Mountains can be reached by the Pangasinan-Nueva Ecija Road, taking one and a half hours to travel from the Downtown of San Nicolas.

== Economy ==
=== Tourism ===
The Caraballo Mountains gained tourists because of the attractions and waterfalls that the Mountain Range offers. The mountains have 100–500 people going to the range each day.

=== Farming ===
Residents have their own backyard gardens, where they plant vegetables, which they sell in a nearby Public Market.

== Gallery ==
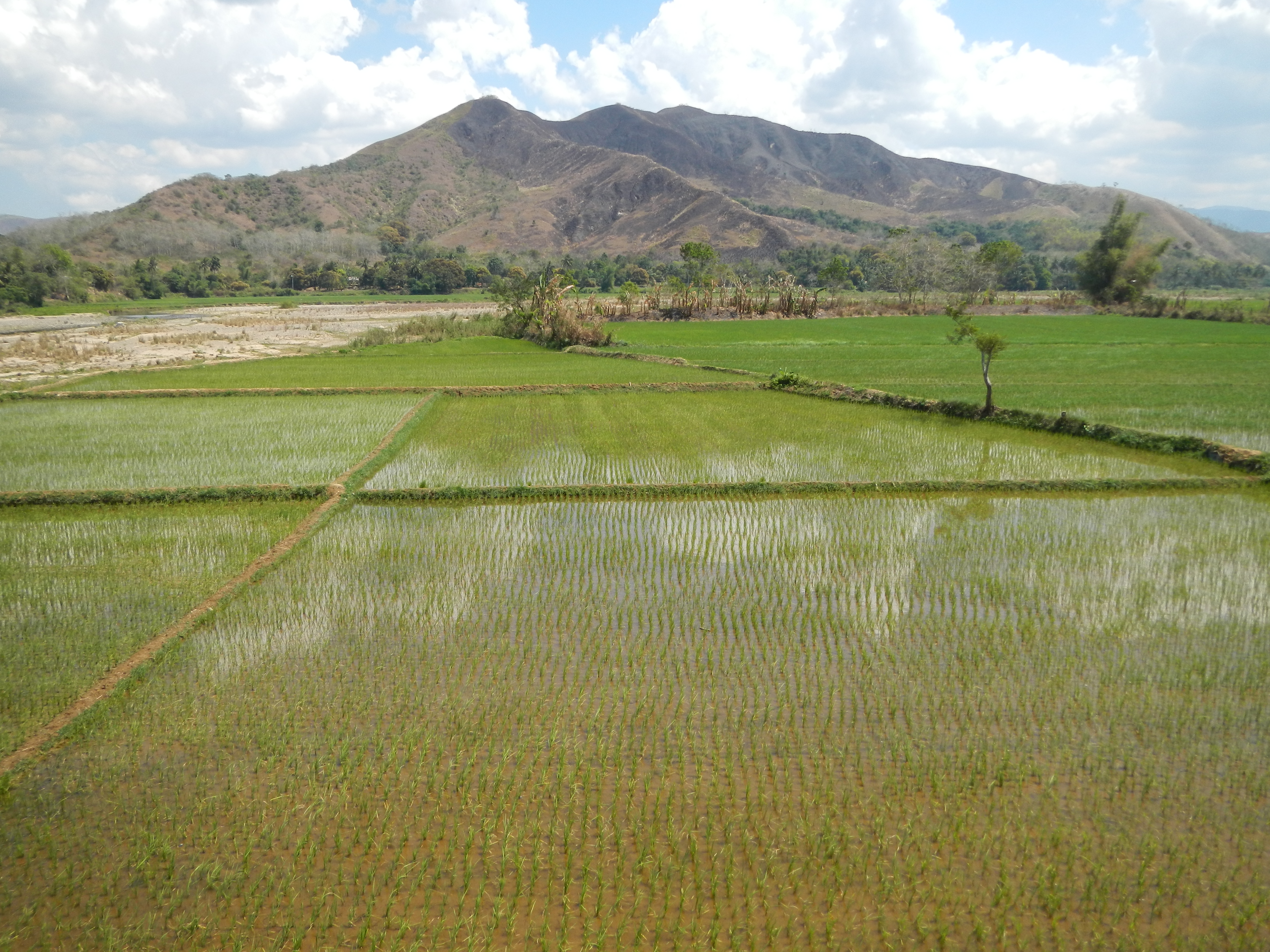
A section of the range at Dupax del Sur

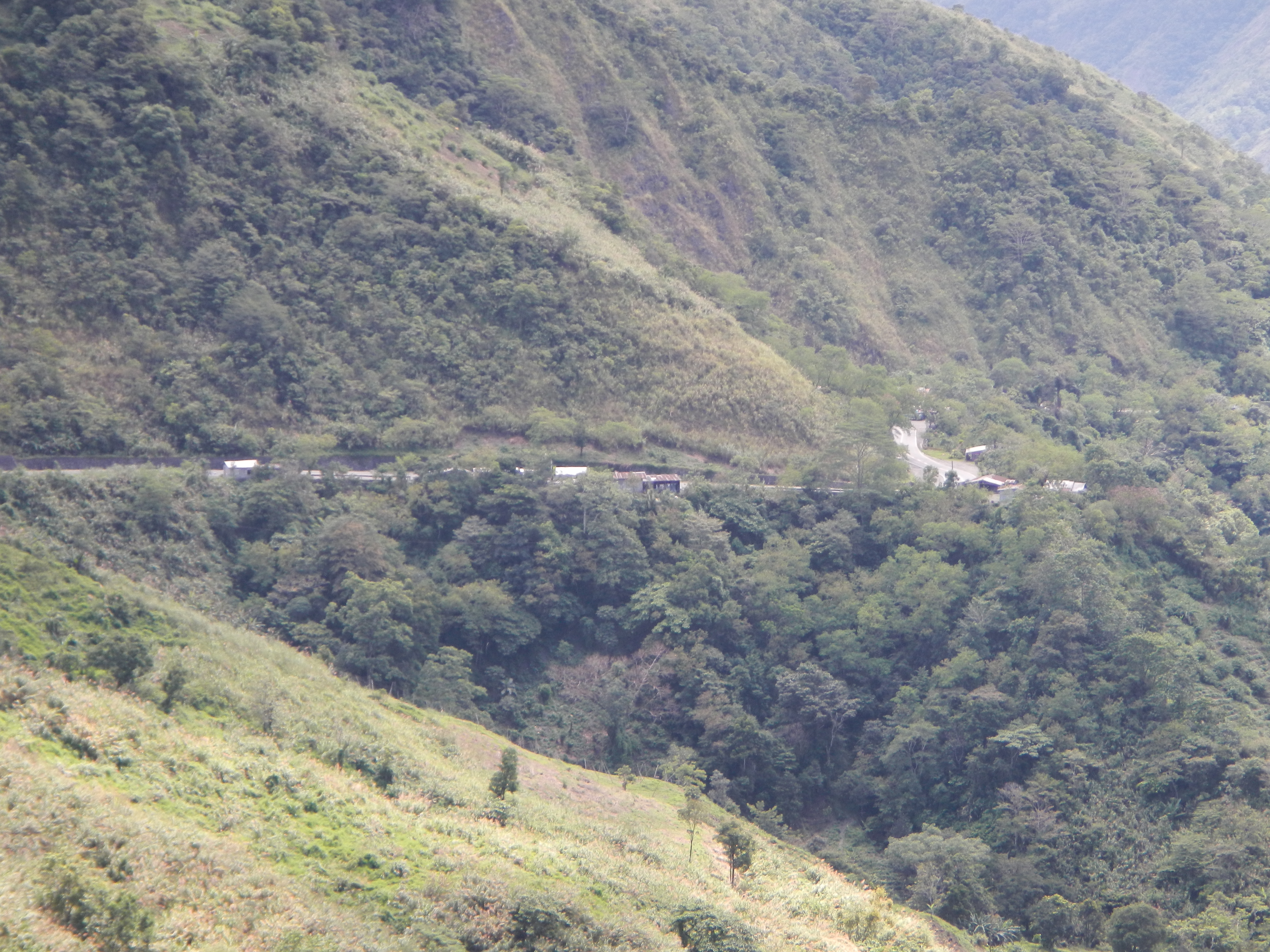
Dalton Pass in Santa Fe

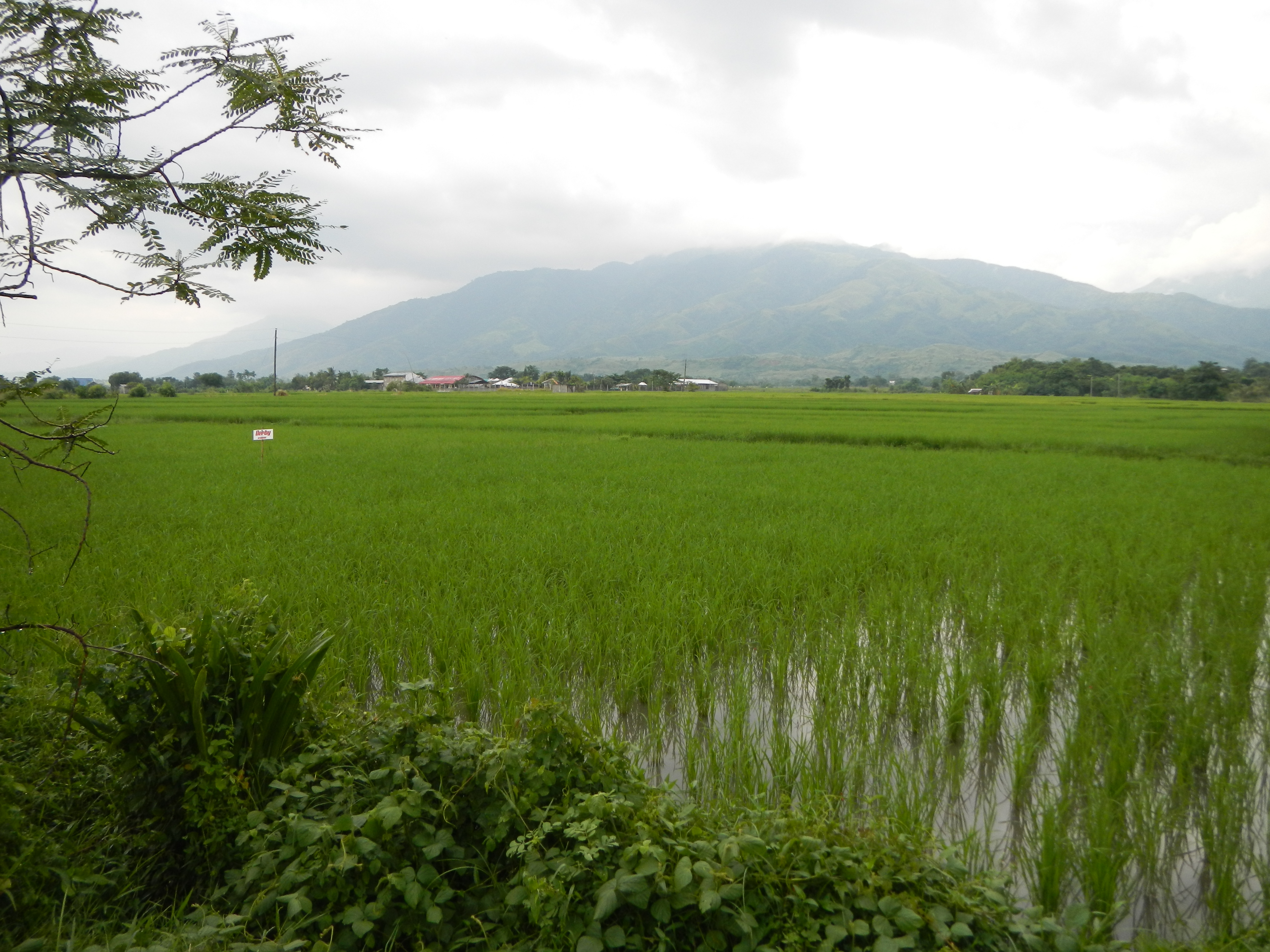
Another view from the fields of eastern Pangasinan

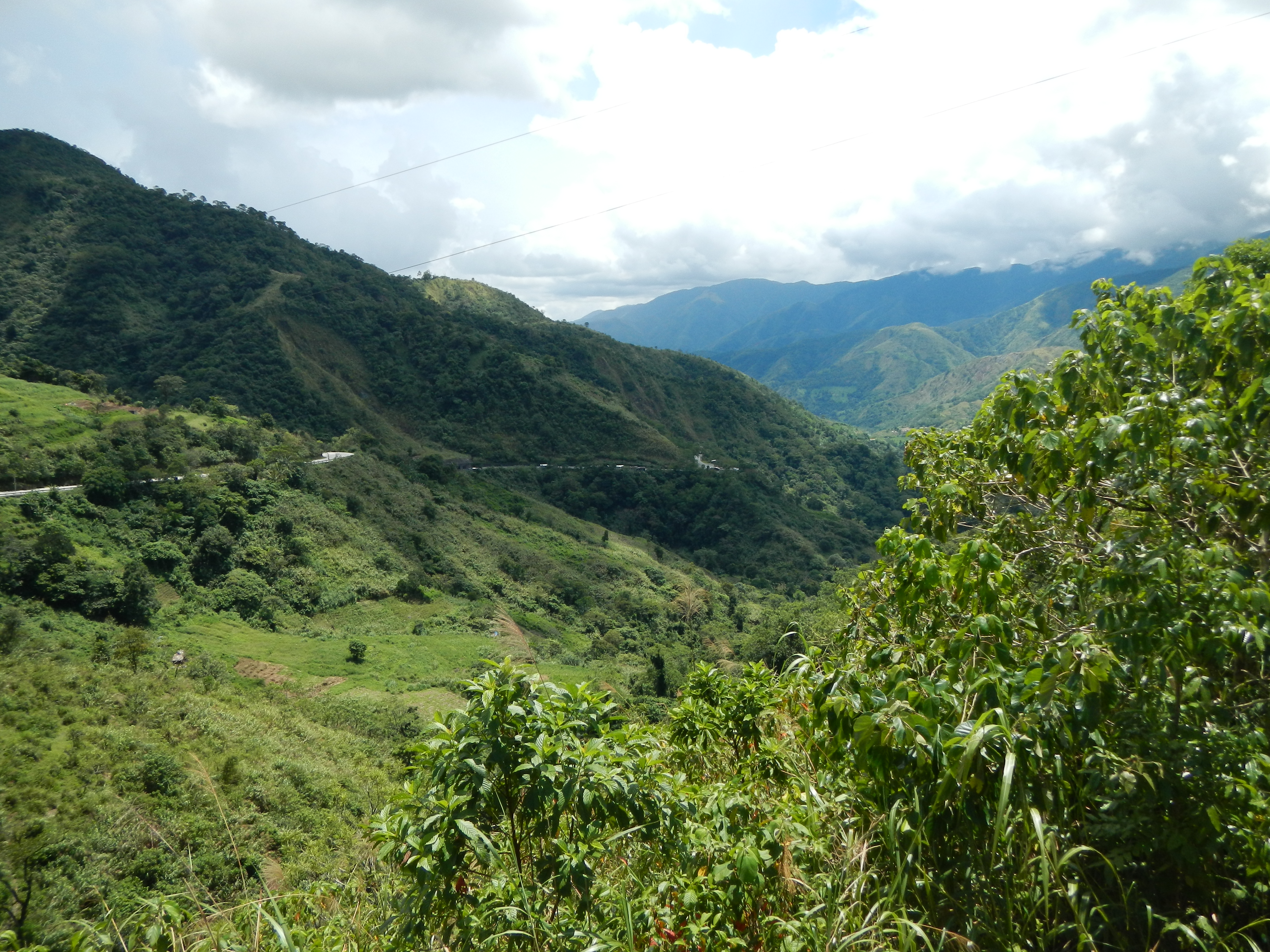
Another view overlooking Dalton Pass
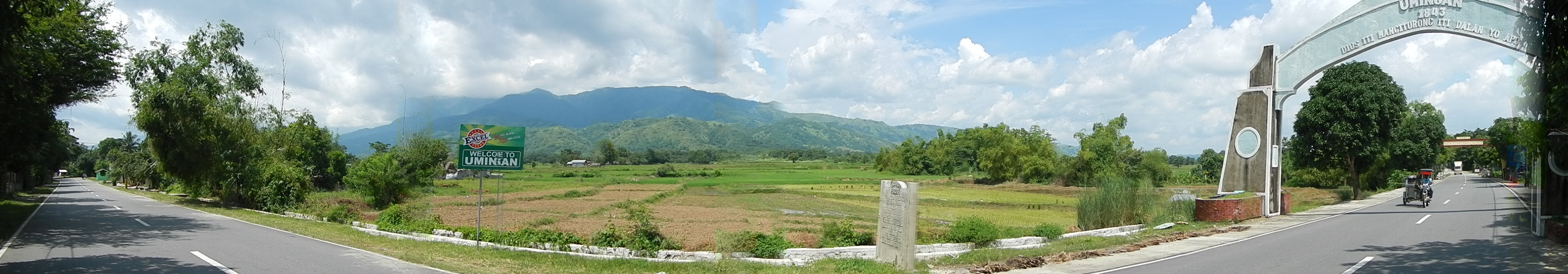
View of the mountains from the Welcome Arch in Umingan

== See also ==
- Geography of the Philippines
- Battle of Villa Verde Trail
