= Alfonso Castañeda =

Municipality in Nueva Vizcaya, Philippines

- Municipality
- Municipality of Alfonso Castañeda
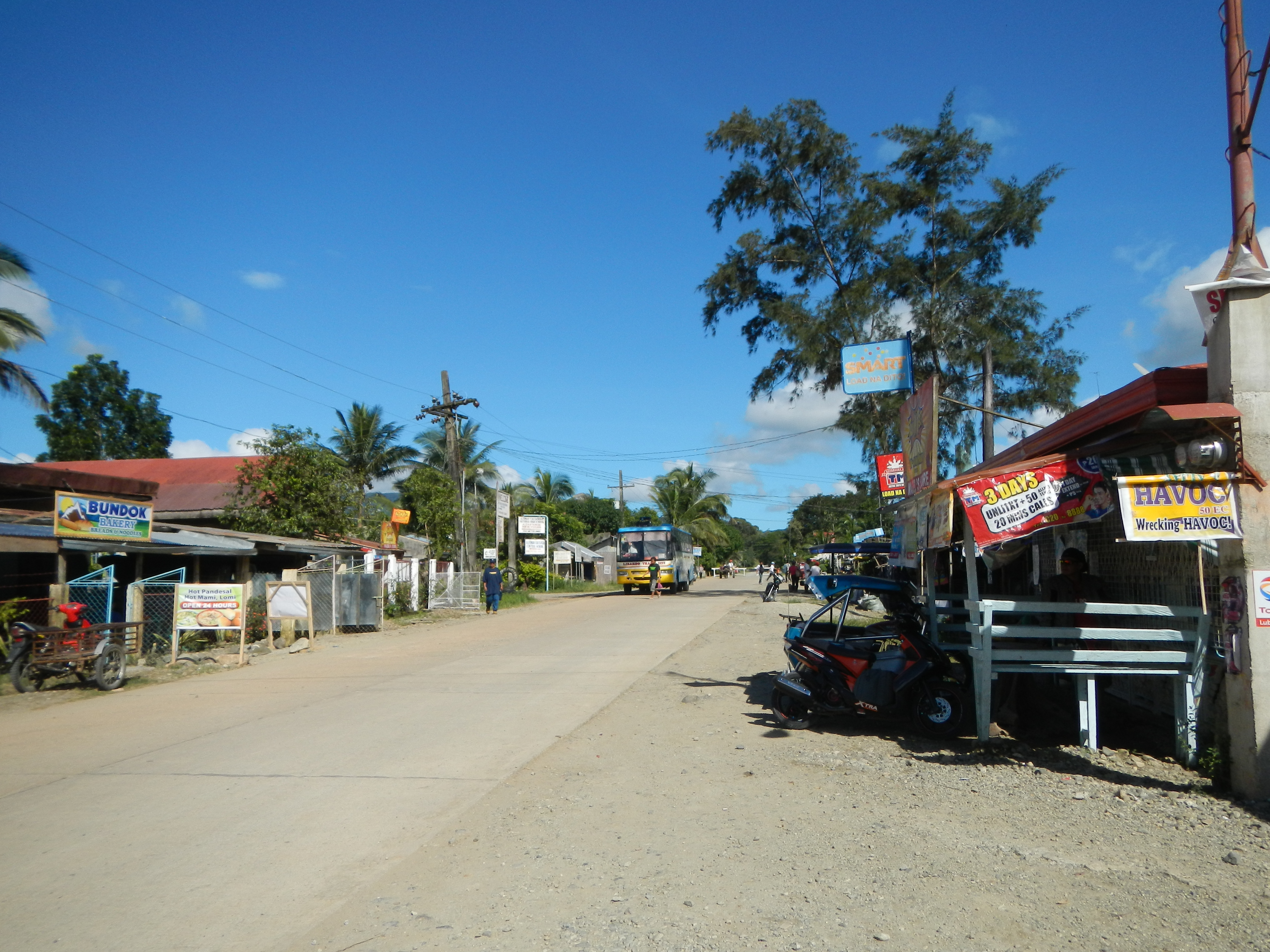
- Downtown area

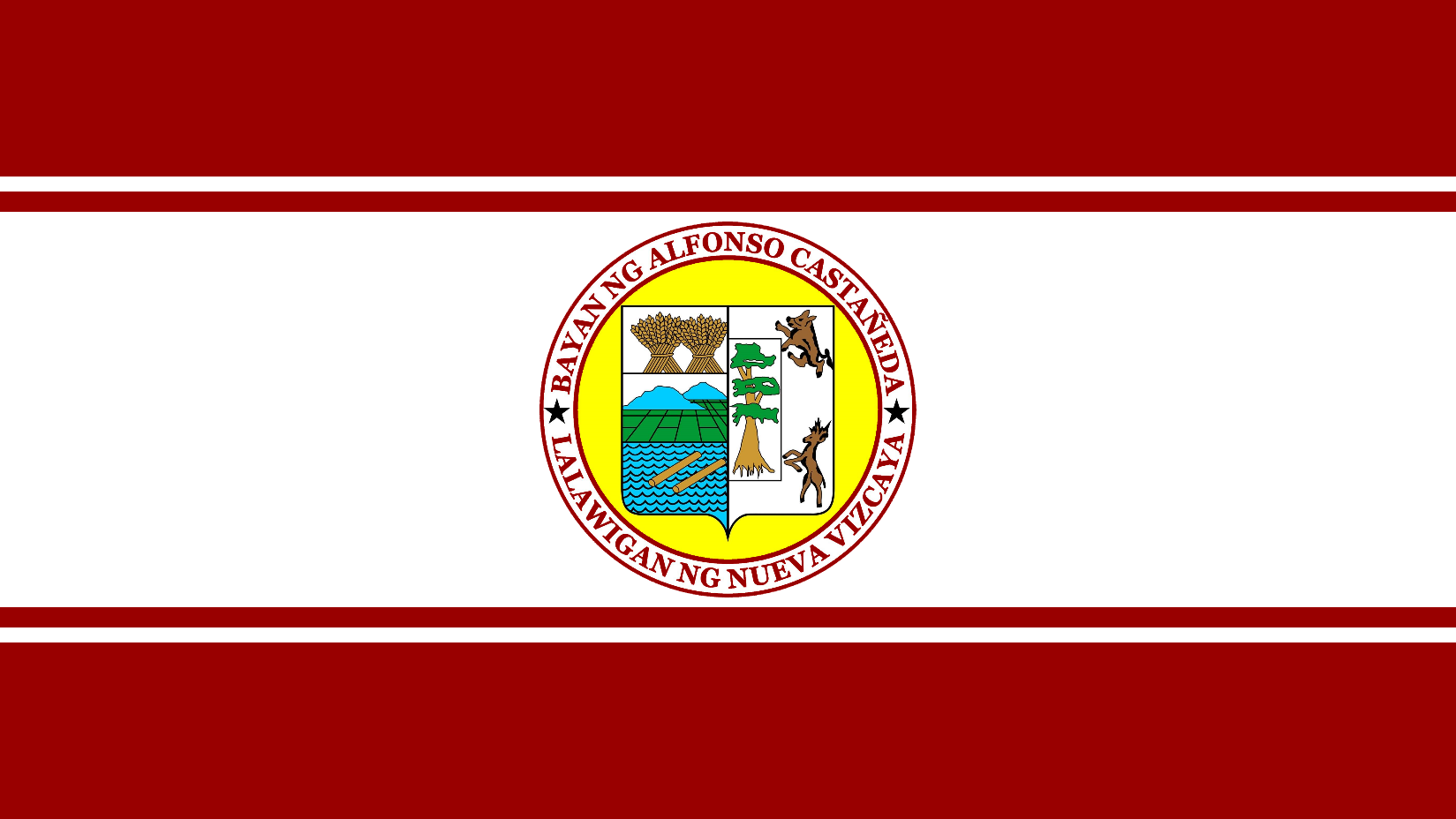
- Flag
- Nickname: Last Frontier of Nueva Vizcaya
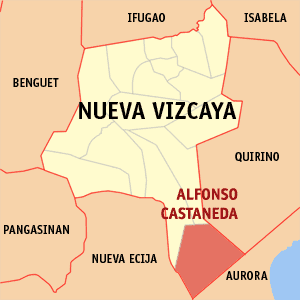
- Map of Nueva Vizcaya with Alfonso Castañeda highlighted
- Interactive map of Alfonso Castañeda
- Location within the Philippines
- Coordinates: 15°47′36″N 121°18′09″E
- Country: Philippines
- Region: Cagayan Valley
- Province: Nueva Vizcaya
- District: Lone district
- Founded: July 10, 1979
- Barangays: 6 (see Barangays)

Government
  - Type: Sangguniang Bayan
  - Mayor: Wilson M. Capia-ao
  - Vice Mayor: Evelinda D. Huerta
  - Representative: Timothy Joseph Cayton (Aksyon)
  - Electorate: 6,866 voters (2025)

Area
  - Total: 375.40 km^{2} (144.94 sq mi)
- Elevation: 430 m (1,410 ft)
- Highest elevation: 1,079 m (3,540 ft)
- Lowest elevation: 169 m (554 ft)

Population (2024 census)
  - Total: 8,933
  - Density: 23.80/km^{2} (61.63/sq mi)
  - Households: 1,795

Economy
  - Income class: 2nd municipal income class
  - Poverty incidence: 10.76% (2023)
  - Revenue: ₱ 168.2 million (2024)
  - Assets: ₱ 501.9 million (2024)
  - Expenditure: ₱ 199.3 million (2024)
  - Liabilities: ₱ 178 million (2024)

Service provider
  - Electricity: Nueva Vizcaya Electric Cooperative (NUVELCO)
- Time zone: UTC+8 (PST)
- ZIP code: 3714
- PSGC: 0205015000
- IDD : area code: +63 (0)78
- Native languages: Ilocano; Tagalog
- Website: https://acasnv.gov.ph

Alfonso Castañeda, officially the Municipality of Alfonso Castañeda (Ilocano: Ili ti Alfonso Castañeda; Tagalog: Bayan ng Alfonso Castañeda), is a municipality in the province of Nueva Vizcaya, Philippines. According to the 2024 census, it has a population of 8,933 people.

== History ==
The territory that now comprises Alfonso Castañeda was part of the municipality of Dupax prior to the division into three separate ones; the other two were Dupax del Norte and Dupax del Sur.

In the early 18th century, Dupax was inhabited by three tribes. One of them were the Bugkalots; the rest were the Malaats and the Caraos.

In 1930, five families supposedly from Batac, Ilocos Norte settled in Lublub, an area inhabited by Bugkalots which was later organized as a sitio of barrio Marikit when the inhabitants increased; Virgilio Castillo was the first teniente del barrio. In 1950, it became an independent barrio in Pantabangan, Nueva Ecija. In 1974, residents headed by village chief Alfredo Castillo, Sr. requested Assemblyman Carlos Padilla to convert the barrio into a municipality in Nueva Vizcaya. Hence, Batas Pambansa Blg. 27, authored and sponsored by Padilla, was issued by President Ferdinand Marcos on April 20, 1979; two barangays, including Lublub which was designated the seat of government, and seven sitios in Dupax del Sur, and four barangays and a sitio in Dupax del Norte, were separated to constitute into an independent municipality named after the first provincial governor to come from a cultural minority. The plebiscite was held on July 10. Castillo was appointed the municipality's first mayor.

== Geography ==
Alfonso Castañeda is situated 164.15 kilometers (102.00 mi) from the provincial capital Bayombong (via Nueva Ecija and Dalton Pass), and 224.99 kilometers (139.80 mi) from the country's capital city of Manila.

=== Barangays ===
Alfonso Castañeda is politically subdivided into 6 barangays. Each barangay consists of puroks and some have sitios.

- Abuyo
- Galintuja
- Cawayan
- Lipuga
- Lublub (Poblacion)
- Pelaway

=== Climate ===
Climate data for Alfonso Castañeda, Nueva Vizcaya
| Month | Jan | Feb | Mar | Apr | May | Jun | Jul | Aug | Sep | Oct | Nov | Dec | Year |
|---|---|---|---|---|---|---|---|---|---|---|---|---|---|
| Mean daily maximum °C (°F) | 25 (77) | 26 (79) | 28 (82) | 30 (86) | 30 (86) | 29 (84) | 28 (82) | 28 (82) | 28 (82) | 28 (82) | 27 (81) | 25 (77) | 28 (82) |
| Mean daily minimum °C (°F) | 18 (64) | 18 (64) | 19 (66) | 21 (70) | 22 (72) | 22 (72) | 22 (72) | 22 (72) | 22 (72) | 21 (70) | 20 (68) | 19 (66) | 21 (69) |
| Average precipitation mm (inches) | 25 (1.0) | 26 (1.0) | 18 (0.7) | 24 (0.9) | 91 (3.6) | 145 (5.7) | 149 (5.9) | 122 (4.8) | 120 (4.7) | 128 (5.0) | 61 (2.4) | 52 (2.0) | 961 (37.7) |
| Average rainy days | 7.7 | 5.7 | 6.8 | 8.0 | 18.2 | 22.1 | 24.3 | 23.4 | 22.7 | 17.5 | 10.0 | 9.4 | 175.8 |
Source: Meteoblue

== Demographics ==
Population census of Alfonso Castañeda
| Year | Pop. | ±% p.a. |
|---|---|---|
| 1980 | 2,797 | — |
| 1990 | 3,751 | +2.98% |
| 1995 | 4,447 | +3.24% |
| 2000 | 4,808 | +1.69% |
| 2007 | 6,655 | +4.59% |
| 2010 | 7,428 | +4.08% |
| 2015 | 7,940 | +1.28% |
| 2020 | 8,539 | +1.54% |
| 2024 | 8,933 | +1.09% |
Source: Philippine Statistics Authority

=== Language ===
Ilocano and Tagalog are the main dialects of the municipality.

== Economy ==
Poverty incidence of Alfonso Castañeda (%)

Source: Philippine Statistics Authority

=== Tourism ===
- Alfonso Castañeda Municipal Hall
- Alfonso Castañeda Town Plaza
- Black Nazarene Parish Church of Alfonso Castañeda
- Casecnan River
- Mount Guiwan

== Government ==
=== Local government ===
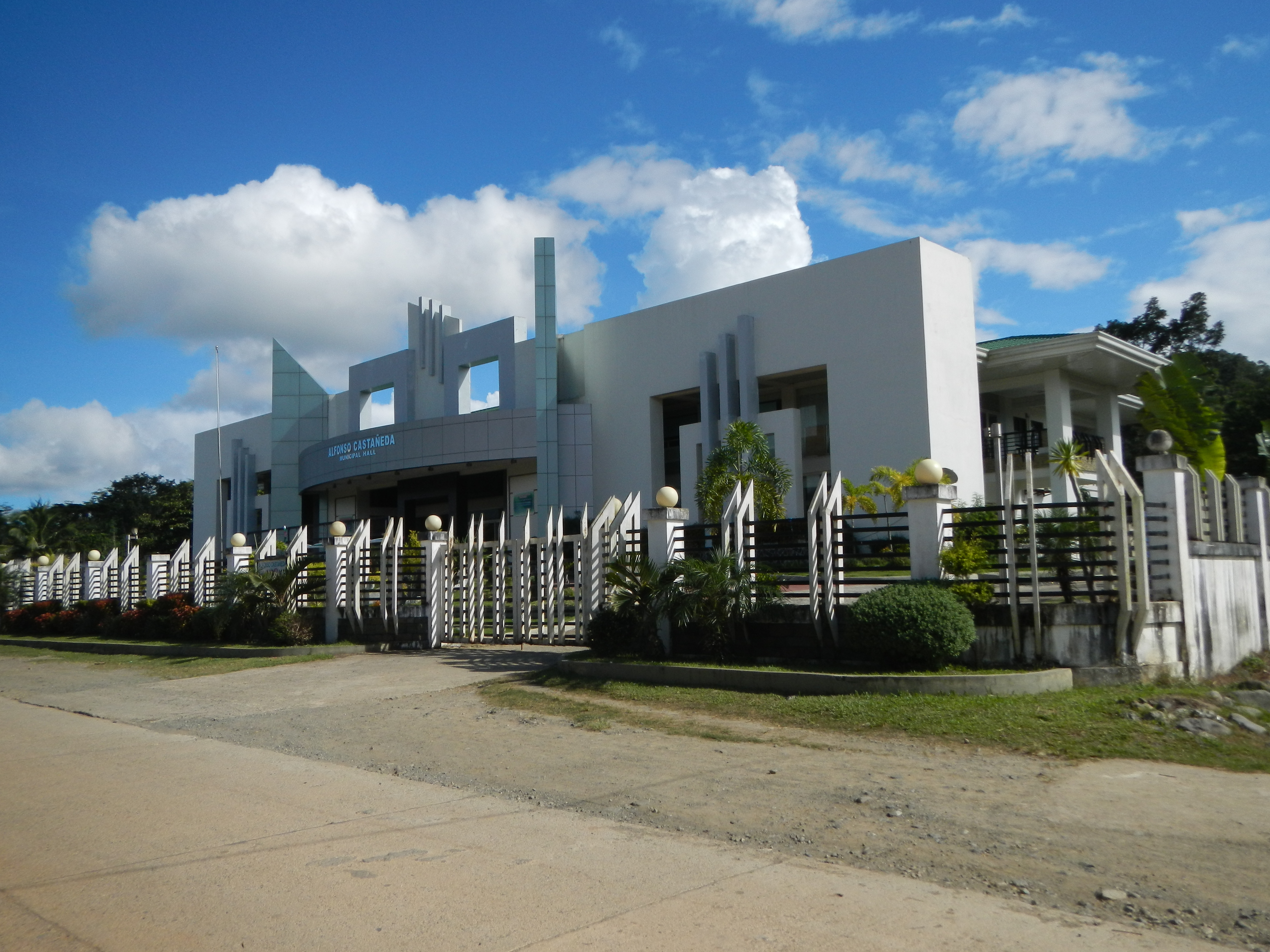
Town hall

Alfonso Castañeda is part of the lone congressional district of the province of Nueva Vizcaya. It is governed by a mayor, designated as its local chief executive, and by a municipal council as its legislative body in accordance with the Local Government Code. The mayor, vice mayor, and the municipal councilors are elected directly in polls held every three years.

=== Elected officials ===
Members of the Municipal Council (2022–2025)
| Position | Name | Party |
|---|---|---|
| Mayor | Wilson M. Capia-ao | Lakas |
| Vice Mayor | Evelinda D. Huerta | Lakas |
| Councilors | Sonny Poncian | Lakas |
| Councilors | Jethro D. Castillo | Independent |
| Councilors | Gabreil Marcelo | Independent |
| Councilors | Rey Palecpec | Lakas |
| Councilors | Jao Valdez | Nacionalista |
| Councilors | Terence Camania | Nacionalista |
| Councilors | Bojie Batino | Lakas |
| Councilors | Zandro Castillo | Lakas |

== Education ==
The Schools Division of Nueva Vizcaya governs the town's public education system. The division office is a field office of the DepEd in Cagayan Valley region. The Alfonso Castañeda Schools District Office governs all the public and private elementary and high schools throughout the municipality.

=== Primary and elementary schools ===
- Abuyo Elementary School
- Alfonso Castañeda Central School
- Alfonso Castañeda Central School Annex
- Balintugon Elementary School
- Cawayan Elementary School
- Galintuja Elementary School
- Lipuga Elementary School
- Mandunot Elementary School
- Marikit East Elementary School
- Pelaway Elementary School
- Pelaway Elementary School Annex

=== Secondary schools ===
- Abuyo National High School
- Alfonso Castañeda National High School
- Casecnan National High School

== Gallery ==
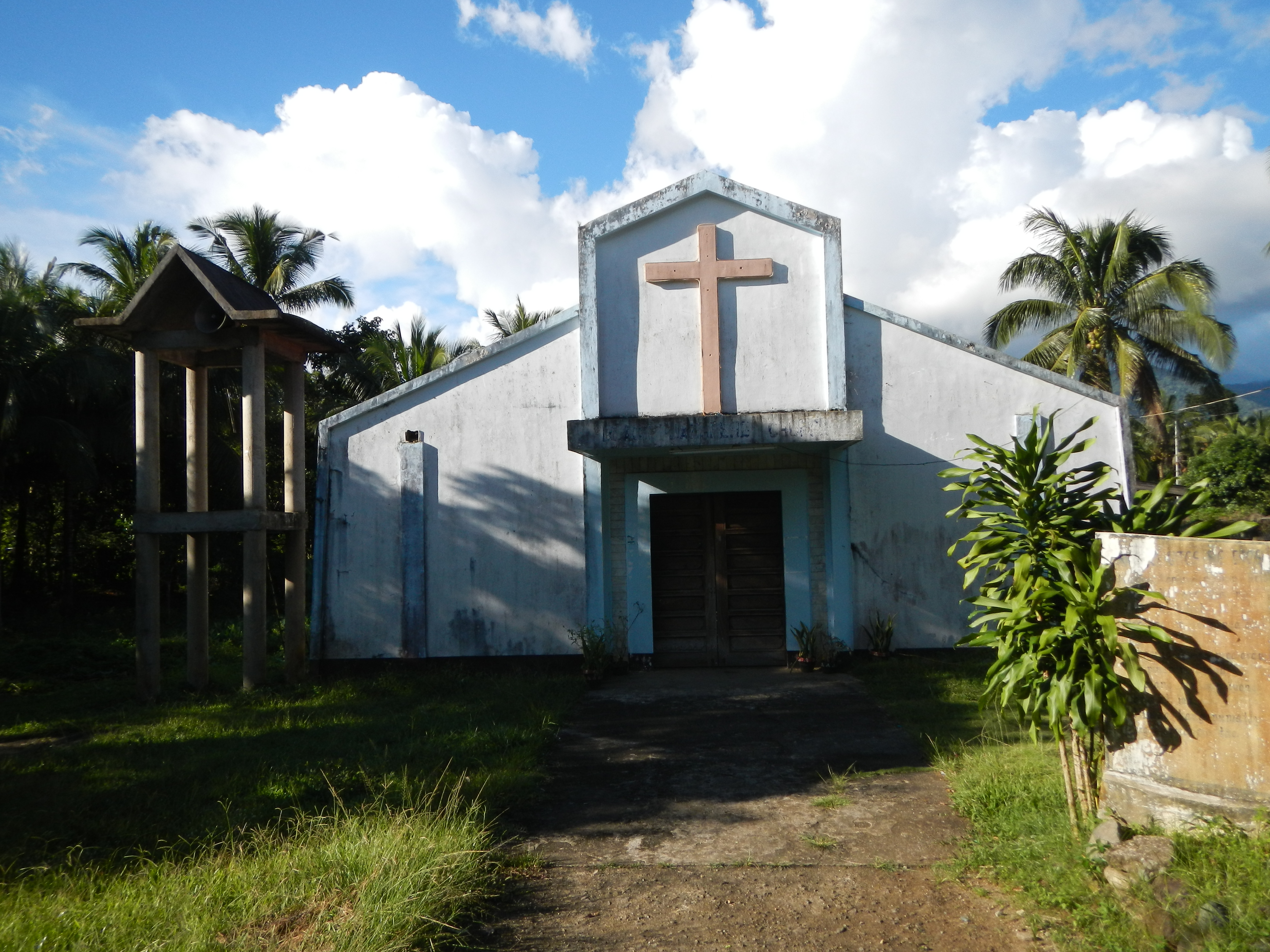
Parish church

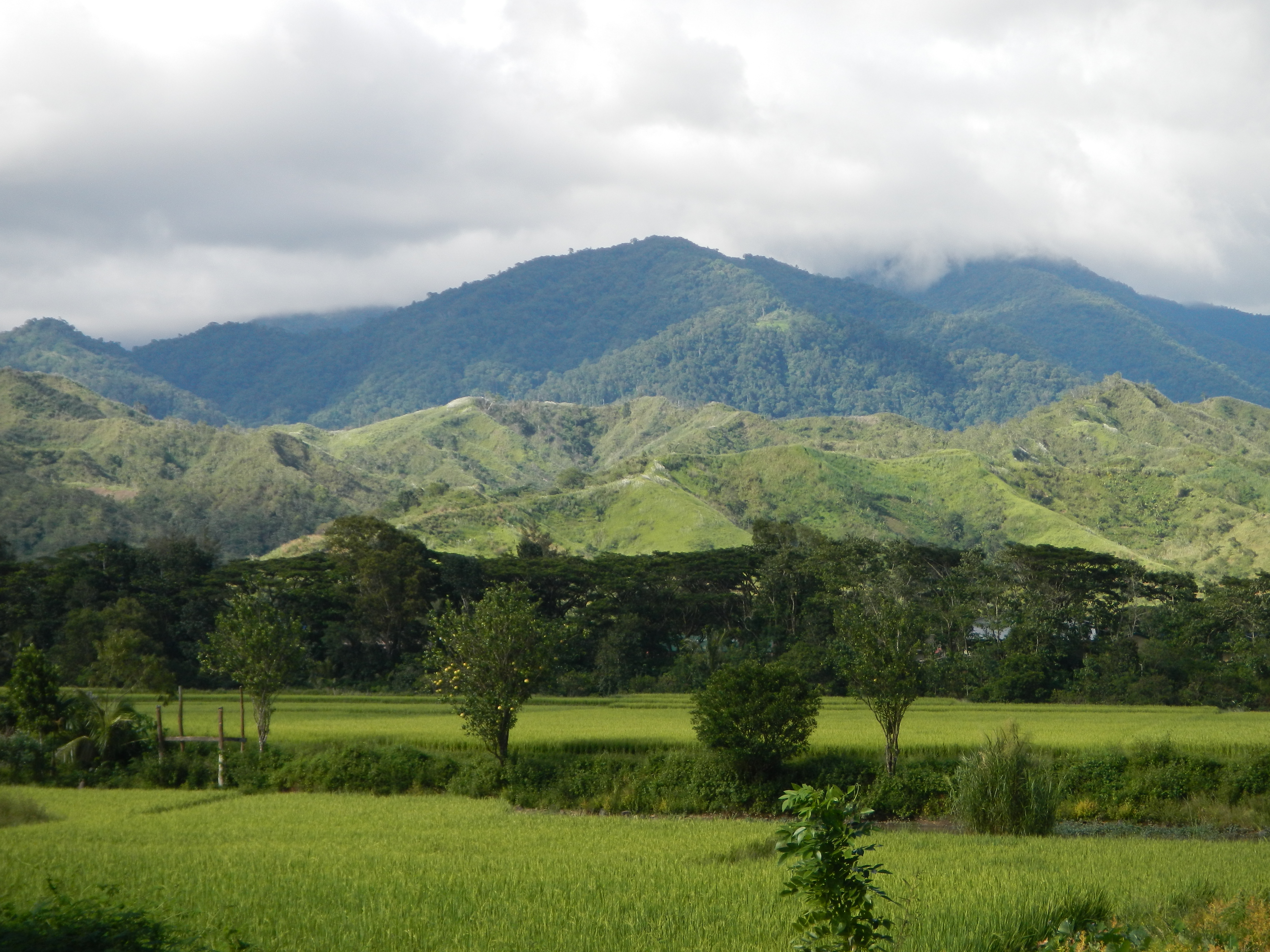
Mount Guiwan
