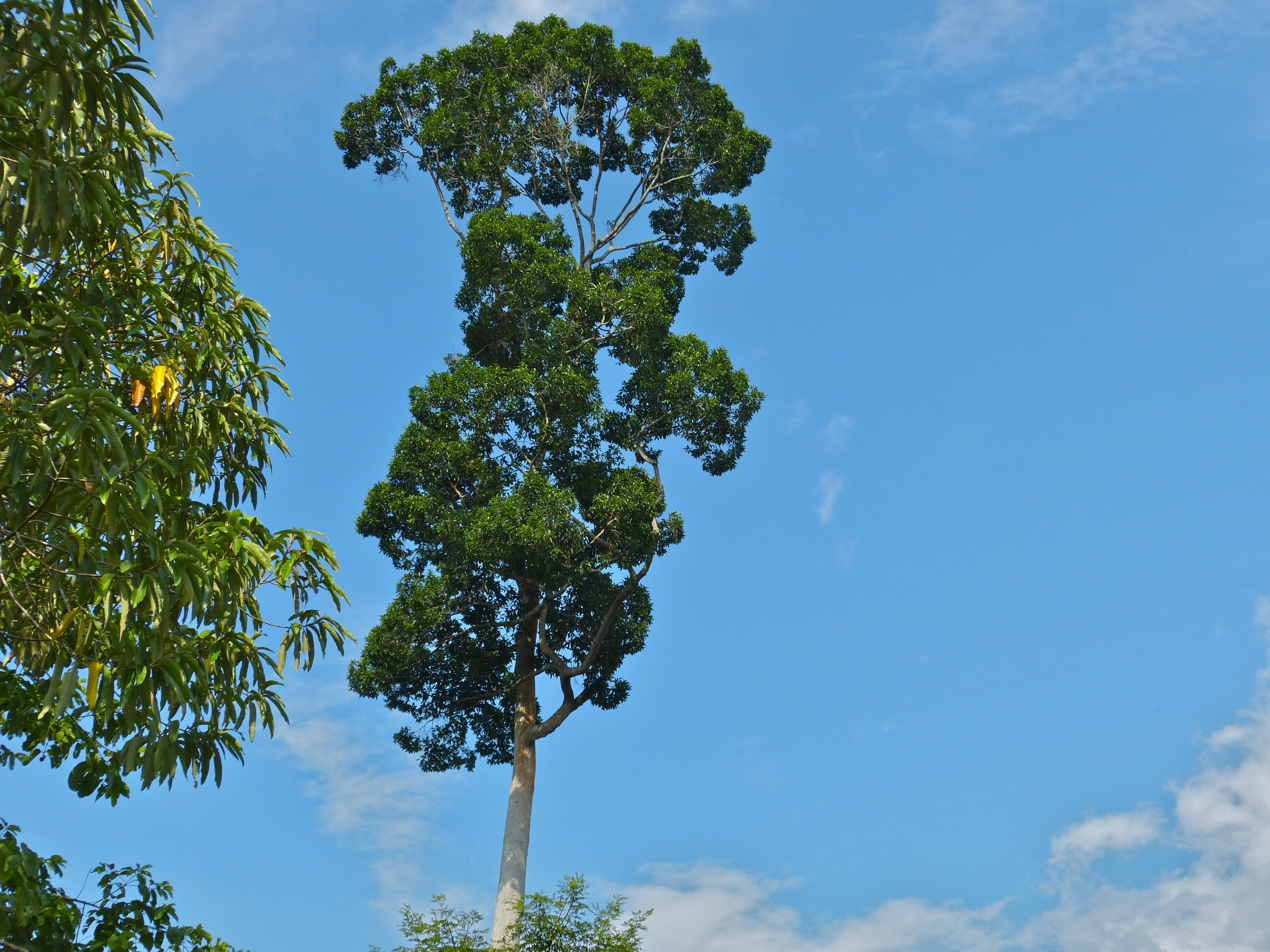

Conservation status
- Least Concern (IUCN 3.1)

Scientific classification
- Kingdom: Plantae
- Clade: Embryophytes
- Clade: Tracheophytes
- Clade: Angiosperms
- Clade: Eudicots
- Clade: Rosids
- Order: Malvales
- Family: Dipterocarpaceae
- Genus: Parashorea
- Species: P. malaanonan

Binomial name
- Parashorea malaanonan (Blanco) Merr.

Synonyms
- Dipterocarpus malaanonan (Blanco) Blanco; Mocanera malaanonan Blanco; Parashorea plicata Brandis; Shorea malaanonan (Blanco) Blume

= Parashorea malaanonan =

Species of tree

Parashorea malaanonan is a species of plant in the family Dipterocarpaceae. it is a tree native to the Philippines and to the northeast coast of Sabah in Borneo. The name malaanonan is derived from Tagalog (mala = false and anonang = custard apple) and is a putative vernacular name for this species. It is a large emergent tree, up to 60 m (200 ft), found in mixed dipterocarp forests on deep friable clay soils. It can still be found in forest reserves in the east coast of Sabah although elsewhere it is threatened by habitat loss. The timber is a light hardwood sold under the trade name of white lauan or white seraya.
