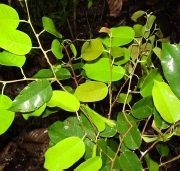

Conservation status
- Least Concern (IUCN 3.1)

Scientific classification
- Kingdom: Plantae
- Clade: Embryophytes
- Clade: Tracheophytes
- Clade: Angiosperms
- Clade: Eudicots
- Clade: Rosids
- Order: Malvales
- Family: Dipterocarpaceae
- Genus: Rubroshorea
- Species: R. polysperma

Binomial name
- Rubroshorea polysperma (Blanco) P.S.Ashton & J.Heck.

Synonyms
- Dipterocarpus polyspermus Blanco; Hopea tangili Blume; Mocanera polysperma Blanco; Shorea polysperma (Blanco) Merr.; Shorea warburgii Gilg

= Rubroshorea polysperma =

Species of flowering plant

Rubroshorea polysperma is a species of flowering plant in the family Dipterocarpaceae. It is endemic to the Philippines. It is threatened by habitat loss. The species is commonly known as tanguile in the Philippines.
