= List of barangays in Cagayan =

The province of Cagayan has 820 barangays comprising its 28 municipalities and 1 city.

== Barangays ==
Most populous in its respective city/municipality (as of 2010)

Barangay	Population					City or municipality
Barangay	2010	2007	2000	1995	1990	City or municipality
Abagao	398	356	357	326	288	Camalaniugan
Abagao	361	376	332	254	270	Lal-lo
Abanqueruan	996	932	821	789	720	Pamplona
Abariongan Ruar	1,114	1,147	839	719	535	Santo Niño (Faire)
Abariongan Uneg	1,018	973	879	819	417	Santo Niño (Faire)
Abbeg	770	735	752	623	594	Alcala
Abolo	737	709	704	675	689	Amulung
Abra	887	832	732	678	696	Gattaran
Accusilian	2,122	2,328	2,188	1,886	1,874	Tuao
Adaoag	886	851	827	854	807	Baggao
Afunan Cabayu	471	429	418	354	319	Camalaniugan
Afusing Bato	404	403	372	411	387	Alcala
Afusing Daga	2,833	2,947	2,887	2,616	2,420	Alcala
Agaman (Proper)	901	672	669	707	478	Baggao
Agaman Norte	1,369	1,096	758	692	590	Baggao
Agaman Sur	908	760	503	393	430	Baggao
Agani	1,152	1,091	896	882	870	Alcala
Aggugaddan	2,372	2,416	2,176	2,013	1,876	Peñablanca
Agguirit	295	299	215	212	191	Amulung
Aggunetan	1,143	1,083	1,149	1,077	1,055	Lasam
Aguiguican	1,718	1,562	1,656	1,577	1,452	Gattaran
Agusi	962	933	934	839	721	Camalaniugan
Ajat (Poblacion)	1,385	1,439	1,228	1,208	1,134	Iguig
Alabiao	1,016	1,498	1,394	1,198	1,151	Tuao
Alabug	3,117	3,199	2,830	2,861	2,453	Tuao
Alaguia	985	979	852	778	722	Lal-lo
Alannay	2,027	2,022	1,959	1,759	1,632	Lasam
Alba	1,632	1,450	1,355	1,246	1,112	Baggao
Alibago (Villa Maria)	1,995	1,882	1,835	1,971	1,640	Enrile
Alilinu	1,340	1,297	1,151	1,069	929	Camalaniugan
Alimanao	2,402	2,360	1,321	876	745	Peñablanca
Alimoan	606	579	537	487	504	Claveria
Alinunu	1,269	1,167	1,205	1,041	1,164	Abulug
Alitungtung	440	414	416	371	332	Amulung
Allasitan	1,127	1,098	1,077	999	1,082	Pamplona
Alucao	1,411	1,235	1,037	857	694	Santa Teresita
Alucao Weste (San Lorenzo)	791	766	637	638	677	Buguey
Ammubuan	1,393	1,363	1,276	1,224	1,262	Ballesteros
Amunitan	1,532	1,571	1,447	1,346	1,082	Gonzaga
Anagguan	667	746	634	635	565	Rizal
Andarayan North	2,247	2,447	2,035	1,895	2,035	Solana
Andarayan South	1,703	1,566	1,569	1,384	1,549	Solana
Angang	1,083	979	925	778	788	Tuao
Annabuculan	551	483	538	502	457	Amulung
Annafatan	1,431	1,372	1,497	1,214	1,118	Amulung
Annafunan East	3,811	3,614	3,193	2,813	2,299	Tuguegarao
Annafunan West	3,122	2,790	2,473	2,034	1,913	Tuguegarao
Annayatan	1,199	958	962	879	725	Baggao
Anquiray	1,429	1,513	1,317	1,304	1,037	Amulung
Antiporda	596	736	598	597	543	Buguey
Anungu	137	86	74	75	69	Rizal
Anurturu	109	130	76	75	35	Rizal
Apayao	880	816	767	673	720	Piat
Aquib	965	1,148	1,001	975	986	Piat
Aridawen	1,207	1,058	982	720	661	Santa Teresita
Asassi	2,183	2,154	1,752	1,473	1,294	Baggao
Asinga-Via	2,097	1,991	1,631	1,281	1,195	Baggao
Atulayan Norte	3,186	2,429	2,555	1,690	1,624	Tuguegarao
Atulayan Sur	4,367	3,653	3,312	2,894	2,156	Tuguegarao
Atulu	1,182	1,071	980	833	762	Iguig
Awallan	1,947	2,218	1,973	1,746	1,598	Baggao
Babayuan	621	587	566	456	423	Amulung
Babuyan Claro	1,423	1,394	1,367	1,096	902	Calayan
Bacagan	1,109	1,055	821	818	673	Baggao
Baccuit	465	500	492	588	453	Amulung
Backiling	1,194	1,248	1,130	1,033	1,115	Aparri
Bacring	673	630	589	516	472	Amulung
Bacsay Cataraoan Norte	418	393	370	317	396	Claveria
Bacsay Cataraoan Sur	466	420	388	329	357	Claveria
Bacsay Mapulapula	444	493	454	390	404	Claveria
Baculod	2,062	1,826	1,889	1,823	1,325	Alcala
Baculud	1,945	1,936	1,888	1,665	1,627	Amulung
Baculud	1,602	1,694	1,538	1,349	1,264	Iguig
Bagay	3,393	3,417	2,970	2,441	2,525	Tuguegarao
Baggao	596	585	596	568	480	Camalaniugan
Bagu	1,774	1,514	1,417	1,284	1,114	Abulug
Bagu	2,207	2,204	1,951	1,688	1,608	Pamplona
Bagumbayan	2,161	2,024	1,991	1,788	1,998	Lal-lo
Bagumbayan	3,854	3,800	3,739	3,616	3,068	Tuao
Bagunot	1,126	843	850	726	692	Baggao
Balagan	431	375	340	303	–	Santo Niño (Faire)
Balagao	3,539	3,310	3,101	2,758	2,554	Tuao
Balanni	644	614	580	565	465	Santo Niño (Faire)
Balatubat	1,652	1,658	1,248	1,075	1,098	Calayan
Balauini	884	833	767	734	597	Amulung
Balingit	856	871	809	698	609	Pamplona
Baliuag	1,599	1,776	1,551	1,337	1,116	Peñablanca
Ballang	458	476	487	538	550	Buguey
Balungcanag	1,021	768	728	723	667	Rizal
Balza	289	293	294	217	247	Buguey
Bangag	1,612	1,561	1,410	1,250	1,139	Aparri
Bangag	915	894	743	663	465	Lal-lo
Bangag	3,948	3,947	3,488	3,171	3,010	Solana
Bangan	1,867	1,855	1,640	1,555	1,399	Sanchez-Mira
Bangatan Ngagan	997	876	815	737	652	Gattaran
Banguian	1,778	1,746	1,520	1,288	1,322	Abulug
Bantay	848	830	698	686	591	Camalaniugan
Bantay	1,441	1,306	1,213	1,056	994	Solana
Baracaoit	2,993	2,708	2,401	2,317	2,111	Gattaran
Baran	771	706	818	565	472	Ballesteros
Barancuag	1,350	1,364	1,373	1,310	1,227	Tuao
Barangay I (Poblacion)	1,022	1,076	1,139	1,292	1,206	Enrile
Barangay II (Poblacion)	2,515	2,266	2,445	2,417	2,305	Enrile
Barangay III-A	2,082	2,318	2,291	2,372	2,104	Enrile
Barangay III (San Roque)	2,302	2,182	2,068	2,192	1,875	Enrile
Barangay IV (Poblacion)	1,081	1,040	939	1,070	986	Enrile
Baraoidan	1,026	891	797	754	630	Gattaran
Barbarit	968	930	909	913	858	Gattaran
Barsat East	1,227	1,167	1,127	989	850	Baggao
Barsat West	1,009	943	700	682	689	Baggao
Basao	1,119	892	829	853	805	Gattaran
Basi East	1,608	1,538	1,216	1,078	1,160	Solana
Basi West	2,110	2,069	1,854	1,596	1,491	Solana
Batangan	1,858	1,854	1,580	1,336	1,321	Gonzaga
Battalan	1,138	1,073	1,187	957	896	Lasam
Battung	2,074	2,283	2,163	2,041	1,754	Tuao
Battut	458	453	419	395	326	Rizal
Batu	976	806	758	715	561	Enrile
Batu	716	764	633	633	579	Rizal
Batu-Parada	849	662	642	579	566	Santa Ana
Baua	2,030	1,865	1,676	1,580	1,518	Gonzaga
Bauan	403	362	304	310	364	Amulung
Bauan East	2,007	1,835	1,760	1,712	1,652	Solana
Bauan West	2,461	2,245	2,267	2,127	2,294	Solana
Baung	1,337	1,311	1,161	1,045	1,056	Piat
Bayabat	1,443	1,503	1,466	1,443	1,339	Amulung
Baybayog	1,869	1,853	1,774	1,774	1,606	Alcala
Bayo	1,661	1,551	1,459	1,271	1,318	Iguig
Bessang	1,183	1,146	991	925	875	Allacapan
Bical	636	581	550	495	494	Lal-lo
Bical	1,728	1,504	1,493	1,403	1,263	Peñablanca
Bicok	1,312	1,361	1,191	1,071	852	Tuao
Bicud	667	586	522	457	287	Lal-lo
Bidduang	2,342	2,001	1,963	1,717	1,737	Pamplona
Bilibigao	574	564	512	452	522	Claveria
Binag	737	578	563	576	575	Lal-lo
Binalan	2,104	2,238	2,095	1,711	1,747	Aparri
Binobongan	566	605	502	394	339	Allacapan
Bisagu	1,517	1,422	1,327	1,336	1,071	Aparri
Bitag Grande	2,917	2,781	2,306	2,149	1,797	Baggao
Bitag Pequeño	1,526	1,403	1,381	1,320	1,145	Baggao
Bolos Point	962	802	885	743	678	Gattaran
Buenavista	321	287	331	323	296	Claveria
Bugatay	1,242	956	1,051	933	913	Peñablanca
Bugnay	1,923	1,850	1,735	1,585	1,454	Tuao
Bukig	797	890	897	788	808	Aparri
Bulala	1,431	1,452	1,320	1,291	1,211	Camalaniugan
Bulala Norte	808	793	892	640	760	Aparri
Bulala Sur	808	776	669	600	652	Aparri
Bulo	1,111	966	907	900	828	Allacapan
Buntun	4,360	2,026	2,734	2,521	1,875	Tuguegarao
Bunugan	1,135	1,073	814	764	641	Baggao
Bural (Zinundungan)	589	448	372	284	163	Rizal
Burot	816	845	713	672	644	Allacapan
Buyun	1,100	859	1,069	1,053	994	Peñablanca
Buyun	1,792	1,558	1,437	1,382	1,255	Santa Teresita
C. Verzosa (Valley Cove)	692	615	523	445	400	Baggao
Caagaman	1,447	1,392	1,403	1,171	1,210	Aparri
Cabaggan	680	606	567	550	601	Pamplona
Cabanbanan Norte	597	517	585	512	523	Gonzaga
Cabanbanan Sur	542	546	528	446	425	Gonzaga
Cabaritan	832	784	751	663	545	Buguey
Cabaritan East	1,727	1,719	1,513	1,374	1,444	Ballesteros
Cabaritan West	2,689	2,568	2,157	2,147	2,005	Ballesteros
Cabasan	958	872	686	615	596	Peñablanca
Cabatacan East (Duldugan)	1,832	1,799	1,779	1,696	1,422	Lasam
Cabatacan West	1,417	1,606	1,517	1,315	1,190	Lasam
Cabayabasan (Capacuan)	1,089	1,020	781	579	717	Lal-lo
Cabayo	151	146	132	129	106	Santo Niño (Faire)
Cabayu	783	733	587	535	437	Ballesteros
Cabayu	307	299	261	218	225	Gattaran
Cabbo	1,567	1,459	1,359	1,172	1,205	Peñablanca
Cabiraoan	3,175	2,954	2,699	2,122	2,257	Gonzaga
Cabudadan	863	805	683	625	576	Calayan
Cabuluan	1,029	925	931	851	772	Alcala
Cabuluan East	1,019	1,110	917	870	924	Ballesteros
Cabuluan West	1,197	1,082	998	961	946	Ballesteros
Cadaanan	2,009	2,013	1,878	1,732	1,661	Solana
Cadcadir East	603	592	505	486	522	Claveria
Cadcadir West	627	659	602	572	567	Claveria
Cadongdongan	504	435	457	436	454	Santa Praxedes
Caggay	5,841	5,074	4,579	3,589	3,189	Tuguegarao
Cagoran	606	564	442	411	395	Lal-lo
Cagumitan	1,599	2,032	1,615	1,459	1,388	Tuao
Calamagui	1,590	1,708	1,540	1,299	1,170	Amulung
Calamagui	1,932	1,896	1,607	1,451	1,362	Solana
Calamegatan	644	629	557	536	497	Buguey
Calantac	2,731	2,469	2,339	2,231	1,992	Alcala
Calaoagan	827	786	694	505	552	Piat
Calaoagan Bassit	1,268	1,118	1,174	1,160	1,292	Gattaran
Calaoagan Dackel	1,175	1,178	1,100	998	933	Gattaran
Calapangan	690	645	571	500	347	Santo Niño (Faire)
Calapangan Norte	838	825	749	857	598	Lasam
Calapangan Sur	779	749	732	659	580	Lasam
Calassitan	1,089	964	751	536	331	Santo Niño (Faire)
Calayan	1,724	1,663	1,610	1,430	1,396	Gonzaga
Calillauan	1,086	918	955	924	869	Solana
Calintaan	875	945	896	765	743	Amulung
Callao	373	343	326	292	245	Gonzaga
Callao	1,543	1,435	1,368	1,289	1,089	Peñablanca
Callao Norte	897	828	802	828	725	Lasam
Callao Sur	897	840	770	767	650	Lasam
Callungan	1,710	1,481	1,485	1,239	1,087	Sanchez-Mira
Calog Norte	934	882	887	744	648	Abulug
Calog Sur	2,309	2,156	1,836	1,572	1,466	Abulug
Camalaggoan/D Leaño	297	341	287	225	161	Claveria
Camasi	3,291	2,975	2,700	2,340	1,838	Peñablanca
Cambabangan	442	462	395	376	314	Rizal
Cambong	955	882	752	696	246	Lal-lo
Campo	180	168	124	127	56	Iguig
Campo	1,160	1,018	933	759	612	Santo Niño (Faire)
Canagatan	418	380	355	325	343	Baggao
Canayun	1,328	1,253	1,214	1,058	1,182	Abulug
Caniugan	625	593	483	378	424	Santa Teresita
Capacuan	436	355	286	78	67	Rizal
Capacuan	467	445	385	342	393	Santa Praxedes
Capagaran (Brigida)	934	745	525	570	469	Allacapan
Capalalian	725	665	626	535	531	Pamplona
Capalutan	882	586	468	464	331	Allacapan
Capanickian Norte	1,039	1,069	1,048	824	642	Allacapan
Capanickian Sur	1,660	1,468	1,393	1,367	1,312	Allacapan
Capanikian	650	596	556	495	512	Claveria
Capatan	3,166	3,085	2,671	2,318	2,130	Tuguegarao
Capiddigan	585	606	619	553	549	Gattaran
Capissayan Norte	2,171	1,955	1,818	1,745	1,564	Gattaran
Capissayan Sur	1,100	905	835	787	805	Gattaran
Carallangan	1,038	895	974	914	780	Alcala
Caratacat	1,245	1,232	1,124	1,004	987	Amulung
Carig	4,081	3,647	2,691	2,152	1,779	Tuguegarao
Carilucud	1,665	1,625	1,640	1,423	1,487	Solana
Caritan Centro	4,062	3,636	4,068	4,210	4,177	Tuguegarao
Caritan Norte	2,931	2,691	2,300	1,692	1,723	Tuguegarao
Caritan Sur	1,115	860	1,158	1,157	1,446	Tuguegarao
Caroan	988	976	852	728	560	Gonzaga
Carupian	1,123	1,052	910	814	724	Baggao
Casagan	587	581	512	520	503	Santa Ana
Casambalangan (Port Irene)	5,418	3,547	3,020	2,604	2,630	Santa Ana
Casicallan Norte	759	782	707	650	539	Gattaran
Casicallan Sur	702	649	658	698	579	Gattaran
Casili Norte	1,103	1,023	965	969	663	Camalaniugan
Casili Sur	605	649	537	494	431	Camalaniugan
Casingsingan Norte	596	614	573	512	532	Amulung
Casingsingan Sur	715	674	669	626	535	Amulung
Casitan	807	816	765	655	714	Gonzaga
Casitan	816	671	636	603	524	Pamplona
Cataggaman Nuevo	7,947	7,692	7,042	6,260	5,758	Tuguegarao
Cataggaman Pardo	3,104	3,187	2,545	2,162	1,957	Tuguegarao
Cataggaman Viejo	4,099	3,921	3,718	3,239	3,084	Tuguegarao
Cataliganan	362	323	303	147	236	Lasam
Cataratan	2,328	1,862	1,468	1,069	1,041	Allacapan
Catarauan	654	616	575	486	453	Amulung
Catarauan	658	655	412	331	327	Piat
Catayauan	3,504	3,685	3,537	3,390	3,464	Lal-lo
Cato	2,248	2,127	2,028	1,914	1,607	Tuao
Catotoran Norte	1,080	1,009	1,035	912	827	Camalaniugan
Catotoran Sur	1,022	921	946	867	723	Camalaniugan
Cattaran	2,576	2,446	2,262	1,947	1,910	Solana
Catugan	1,383	1,302	1,306	1,309	1,165	Lal-lo
Catugay	845	745	660	614	628	Baggao
Centro	2,192	2,440	2,167	2,106	1,932	Amulung
Centro (Poblacion)	2,400	2,214	2,220	2,139	2,241	Abulug
Centro (Poblacion)	1,837	2,183	2,115	2,350	2,239	Buguey
Centro (Poblacion)	1,490	1,502	1,463	1,644	1,459	Lal-lo
Centro (Poblacion)	1,086	1,137	1,113	1,201	1,284	Pamplona
Centro (Poblacion)	2,964	2,832	2,746	2,433	2,321	Peñablanca
Centro (Poblacion)	4,637	4,056	3,239	2,686	2,184	Santa Ana
Centro 1 (Poblacion)	981	717	628	721	657	Aparri
Centro 1 (Poblacion)	1,205	984	1,126	1,099	1,260	Tuguegarao
Centro 2 (Poblacion)	388	352	532	461	490	Aparri
Centro 2 (Poblacion)	520	739	710	842	840	Tuguegarao
Centro 3 (Poblacion)	56	54	81	98	101	Aparri
Centro 3 (Poblacion)	294	492	587	565	702	Tuguegarao
Centro 4 (Poblacion)	131	173	157	91	83	Aparri
Centro 4 (Poblacion)	784	701	1,062	1,661	988	Tuguegarao
Centro 5 (Poblacion)	183	214	279	209	204	Aparri
Centro 5 (Poblacion)	1,426	1,339	1,752	1,842	1,973	Tuguegarao
Centro 6 (Poblacion)	260	250	348	303	293	Aparri
Centro 6 (Poblacion)	346	316	272	473	597	Tuguegarao
Centro 7 (Poblacion)	296	263	317	277	319	Aparri
Centro 7 (Poblacion)	294	319	218	435	304	Tuguegarao
Centro 8 (Poblacion)	172	182	281	249	271	Aparri
Centro 8 (Poblacion)	248	261	249	363	558	Tuguegarao
Centro 9 (Poblacion)	1,044	838	984	871	775	Aparri
Centro 9 (Poblacion)	1,239	951	1,351	1,252	1,037	Tuguegarao
Centro 10 (Poblacion)	132	125	144	192	163	Aparri
Centro 10 (Poblacion)	2,270	1,959	2,324	2,376	2,667	Tuguegarao
Centro 11 (Poblacion)	217	205	173	249	235	Aparri
Centro 11 (Poblacion)	2,425	3,128	2,639	2,328	1,760	Tuguegarao
Centro 12 (Poblacion)	137	171	145	119	141	Aparri
Centro 12 (Poblacion)	1,771	2,323	1,895	1,505	1,135	Tuguegarao
Centro 13 (Poblacion)	134	145	180	144	166	Aparri
Centro 14 (Poblacion)	280	254	271	362	365	Aparri
Centro 15 (Poblacion)	8	12	100	141	157	Aparri
Centro East (Poblacion)	1,418	1,684	1,562	1,624	1,389	Allacapan
Centro East (Poblacion)	3,838	3,559	3,505	3,481	3,352	Ballesteros
Centro East (Poblacion)	1,697	1,650	1,229	1,214	1,068	Santa Teresita
Centro I (Poblacion)	1,791	1,741	1,980	1,745	1,548	Claveria
Centro I (Poblacion)	1,896	2,078	2,029	1,848	1,491	Lasam
Centro I (Poblacion)	2,437	2,441	2,412	2,229	2,167	Sanchez-Mira
Centro I (Poblacion)	887	806	766	713	598	Santa Praxedes
Centro II	797	782	628	505	427	Calayan
Centro II (Poblacion)	628	619	695	655	623	Claveria
Centro II (Poblacion)	2,236	2,259	2,140	2,056	2,019	Lasam
Centro II (Poblacion)	2,079	2,299	2,232	1,893	1,869	Sanchez-Mira
Centro II (Poblacion)	745	723	546	519	556	Santa Praxedes
Centro III	1,250	1,337	1,339	1,193	1,151	Claveria
Centro III (Poblacion)	1,889	1,817	1,677	1,450	1,343	Lasam
Centro IV (Nangasangan)	1,112	1,111	1,072	1,121	1,162	Claveria
Centro Norte (Poblacion)	1,875	1,937	1,966	1,699	1,799	Alcala
Centro Norte (Poblacion)	1,106	986	997	1,047	1,020	Camalaniugan
Centro Norte (Poblacion)	1,232	1,213	1,485	1,390	1,292	Gattaran
Centro Norte (Poblacion)	2,685	2,522	2,368	2,273	2,046	Santo Niño (Faire)
Centro Northeast (Poblacion)	970	1,010	986	822	807	Solana
Centro Northwest (Poblacion)	1,609	1,627	1,468	1,369	1,382	Solana
Centro Southeast (Poblacion)	752	733	871	792	765	Solana
Centro Southwest (Poblacion)	1,071	842	998	951	938	Solana
Centro Sur (Poblacion)	2,735	2,567	2,330	2,262	2,187	Alcala
Centro Sur (Poblacion)	829	856	892	837	678	Camalaniugan
Centro Sur (Poblacion)	1,901	1,521	1,840	1,738	1,758	Gattaran
Centro Sur (Poblacion)	2,307	2,509	2,156	2,078	2,003	Santo Niño (Faire)
Centro V (Mina)	1,149	1,222	1,109	1,017	1,006	Claveria
Centro VI (Minanga)	1,738	1,767	1,665	1,497	1,297	Claveria
Centro VII (Malasin East)	926	948	866	802	780	Claveria
Centro VIII (Malasin West)	843	821	760	593	490	Claveria
Centro West	669	682	748	727	715	Buguey
Centro West	1,447	1,340	1,142	1,007	972	Santa Teresita
Centro West (Poblacion)	1,780	1,860	1,793	1,685	1,615	Allacapan
Centro West (Poblacion)	1,996	1,853	1,641	1,577	1,626	Ballesteros
Concepcion	1,100	1,045	1,135	1,020	1,055	Amulung
Cordova	1,563	1,640	1,483	1,331	1,241	Amulung
Culao	1,095	1,038	1,007	837	686	Claveria
Cullit	544	452	466	424	331	Camalaniugan
Cullit	909	1,016	861	869	927	Gattaran
Cullit	856	744	760	535	719	Lal-lo
Culong	2,013	1,843	1,784	1,619	1,335	Tuao
Cumao	1,265	1,201	1,276	1,148	1,033	Gattaran
Cunig	693	633	474	379	359	Gattaran
Curva	3,699	3,456	3,100	2,760	2,314	Pamplona
Daan-Ili	1,635	1,480	1,093	1,053	1,096	Allacapan
Dabbac Grande	707	646	583	569	448	Baggao
Dacal	758	741	728	620	689	Sanchez-Mira
Dacal-Lafugu	1,012	926	916	885	684	Camalaniugan
Dadao	1,804	1,872	1,588	1,187	1,065	Calayan
Dadda	1,772	1,690	1,580	1,320	1,389	Amulung
Dadda	1,076	1,074	1,043	869	921	Tuguegarao
Dafunganay	96	130	213	272	43	Amulung
Dagueray	737	726	662	555	523	Sanchez-Mira
Dagupan	1,130	1,566	2,122	826	840	Allacapan
Dagupan	817	795	655	504	391	Lal-lo
Dagupan	1,851	1,590	1,484	1,328	1,165	Tuao
Dalaoig	2,526	2,330	2,287	2,007	1,955	Alcala
Dalaya	837	790	735	689	669	Buguey
Dalaya	922	887	718	600	583	Lal-lo
Dalayap	540	453	390	378	299	Allacapan
Dalin	1,181	838	838	783	791	Baggao
Dalla	1,385	1,480	1,392	1,372	1,442	Baggao
Dalupiri	611	606	555	518	458	Calayan
Dammang	756	705	620	538	490	Sanchez-Mira
Dammang Norte (Joaquin de la Cruz)	559	563	448	319	303	Camalaniugan
Dammang Sur (Felipe Tuzon)	243	335	258	257	60	Camalaniugan
Damurog	1,110	1,244	1,132	1,167	1,069	Alcala
Dana-Ili	1,201	1,118	1,090	955	1,048	Abulug
Dassun	3,639	3,542	3,288	3,128	2,706	Solana
Dibalio	794	853	1,709	724	687	Claveria
Dibay	1,844	1,777	1,623	1,548	1,509	Calayan
Dilam	1,409	1,585	1,458	1,235	1,120	Calayan
Diora-Zinungan	1,163	867	718	733	551	Santa Ana
Divisoria	2,257	1,615	1,903	1,903	1,734	Enrile
Dodan	2,182	2,292	2,108	1,933	1,675	Aparri
Dodan	3,193	2,863	2,763	2,471	2,022	Peñablanca
Dugayung	1,337	1,210	1,139	1,090	1,037	Amulung
Dugayung	902	839	909	846	919	Piat
Dugo	1,972	1,990	1,898	1,668	1,616	Camalaniugan
Dummun	1,257	1,202	1,362	1,138	1,225	Gattaran
Dumpao	821	951	737	668	587	Iguig
Dungao	1,307	1,430	1,146	1,138	1,165	Santo Niño (Faire)
Dungeg	721	608	554	506	489	Santa Ana
Dungeg	586	579	632	560	–	Santa Teresita
Dunggan	543	508	447	405	349	Rizal
Duyun	1,107	1,193	899	829	776	Rizal
Estefania	2,327	2,056	1,993	1,651	1,515	Amulung
Fabrica	347	360	394	–	166	Lal-lo
Finugo Norte	528	520	504	443	384	Lasam
Flourishing (Poblacion)	1,897	1,926	1,748	1,669	1,567	Gonzaga
Fuga Island	1,884	1,786	1,733	1,419	1,354	Aparri
Fugu	2,432	2,353	1,750	1,643	1,255	Ballesteros
Fugu	348	254	273	229	29	Gattaran
Fugu	1,776	1,738	1,662	1,629	1,706	Tuao
Fula	877	857	879	842	774	Buguey
Furagui	1,714	1,469	1,446	1,260	1,120	Solana
Fusina	528	564	405	334	194	Camalaniugan
Fusina	421	454	397	374	264	Lal-lo
Gabun	1,134	1,125	1,107	847	801	Lasam
Gabut	1,005	948	881	899	836	Amulung
Gaddang	1,976	2,363	1,866	1,589	1,487	Aparri
Gaddangao	984	791	837	829	719	Rizal
Gadu	3,243	2,878	2,671	2,431	2,214	Solana
Gagaddangan	197	205	209	188	221	Allacapan
Gaggabutan East	798	888	740	650	671	Rizal
Gaggabutan West	1,299	1,106	955	704	725	Rizal
Gammad	1,693	1,523	1,298	955	1,061	Iguig
Gang-ngo	1,282	1,243	1,083	1,001	920	Camalaniugan
Gangauan	769	698	657	603	594	Amulung
Ganzano	601	570	486	420	344	Gattaran
Garab	384	412	304	278	266	Iguig
Gattu	410	259	192	65	–	Pamplona
Gen. Eulogio Balao	1,361	1,160	1,130	896	711	Solana
Goran	341	345	300	229	196	Amulung
Gosi Norte	995	883	885	684	603	Tuguegarao
Gosi Sur	1,185	1,163	1,092	916	866	Tuguegarao
Guiddam	3,084	3,085	2,608	2,422	2,634	Abulug
Guising	1,021	1,241	1,005	1,071	1,077	Gattaran
Gumarueng	2,365	1,788	1,806	1,408	1,587	Piat
Hacienda Intal	5,165	4,581	4,323	3,189	2,942	Baggao
Ibulo	298	269	249	246	292	Baggao
Ignacio Jurado (Finugu Sur)	1,540	1,573	1,380	1,196	1,087	Lasam
Illuru Norte	739	631	562	582	490	Rizal
Illuru Sur	1,199	1,138	1,077	1,039	903	Rizal
Imurong	3,464	3,236	3,013	2,833	2,679	Baggao
Inga	1,119	907	902	914	843	Enrile
Ipil	1,903	1,802	1,642	1,603	1,396	Gonzaga
Iraga	4,058	3,624	3,624	3,394	3,184	Solana
Iringan	1,714	1,712	1,675	1,340	1,402	Allacapan
Isca	1,163	1,089	902	731	664	Gonzaga
J. Pallagao	823	720	628	485	413	Baggao
Jurisdiccion	716	604	988	535	542	Amulung
Jurisdiction	1,421	1,289	801	1,074	977	Alcala
Jurisdiction	653	580	535	524	440	Camalaniugan
Jurisdiction	1,021	964	895	837	773	Lal-lo
Kapanikian	633	600	531	502	538	Santa Ana
Kilkiling	1,010	940	871	772	713	Claveria
Kittag	218	272	308	270	–	Sanchez-Mira
L. Adviento	784	686	701	720	625	Gattaran
La Suerte	819	794	882	715	579	Amulung
Labben	1,715	1,762	1,503	1,371	1,216	Allacapan
Lablabig	498	495	462	391	364	Claveria
Lakambini	1,072	898	897	867	654	Tuao
Lalafugan	1,369	1,214	1,190	974	954	Lal-lo
Lallayug	2,122	2,139	1,935	1,718	1,522	Tuao
Langagan	2,045	1,781	1,501	1,394	1,249	Sanchez-Mira
Langgan	166	170	146	145	160	Gattaran
Lanna	1,941	1,961	1,728	1,741	1,605	Enrile
Lanna	3,596	2,999	3,165	2,751	2,583	Solana
Lannig	1,474	1,324	1,293	1,126	923	Solana
Lapi	2,318	2,602	2,622	1,924	1,841	Peñablanca
Lapogan	1,860	1,599	1,671	1,595	1,626	Gattaran
Larion Alto	1,336	1,348	1,139	880	938	Tuguegarao
Larion Bajo	2,144	1,883	1,631	1,212	1,170	Tuguegarao
Lasilat	1,206	1,085	929	870	759	Baggao
Lattac	1,427	1,475	1,316	1,339	1,321	Santo Niño (Faire)
Lattut	633	681	625	631	553	Rizal
Lemu Norte	1,276	1,284	1,275	1,245	1,128	Enrile
Lemu Sur	851	892	879	877	869	Enrile
Leonarda	1,589	2,097	2,426	1,894	601	Tuguegarao
Leron	1,529	1,299	1,305	1,310	1,092	Buguey
Libag Norte	2,246	1,963	1,859	1,625	1,545	Tuguegarao
Libag Sur	2,452	2,018	1,969	1,715	1,659	Tuguegarao
Libertad	3,219	3,033	2,946	2,232	2,809	Abulug
Linao	1,533	1,390	1,726	1,206	1,450	Aparri
Linao East	6,417	6,265	5,350	4,986	4,618	Tuguegarao
Linao Norte	2,982	2,852	2,657	2,368	2,071	Tuguegarao
Linao West	1,628	1,436	1,375	1,257	1,206	Tuguegarao
Lingu	1,836	1,840	1,530	1,258	1,049	Solana
Linno (Villa Cruz)	460	472	423	426	406	Rizal
Lipatan	825	751	790	784	905	Santo Niño (Faire)
Liwan	378	356	322	315	255	Rizal
Liwan Norte	2,709	2,355	2,377	2,042	1,856	Enrile
Liwan Sur	1,046	835	817	760	703	Enrile
Logac	2,229	1,968	1,918	1,491	1,529	Lal-lo
Logung	567	569	548	548	516	Amulung
Lubo	1,186	1,207	1,083	940	819	Santo Niño (Faire)
Lucban	2,646	2,590	2,369	2,186	3,185	Abulug
Luec	361	319	271	269	254	Camalaniugan
Luga	1,535	1,487	965	964	915	Santa Teresita
Luzon	528	466	443	483	352	Claveria
Mabanguc	1,010	993	970	922	966	Aparri
Mabbang	601	531	376	332	353	Rizal
Mabini	903	769	716	685	536	Baggao
Mabitbitnong	317	326	267	259	254	Santo Niño (Faire)
Mabnang	563	560	516	499	494	Claveria
Mabuno	3,558	2,716	2,277	1,864	2,031	Gattaran
Mabuttal East	1,280	1,296	1,201	1,005	1,052	Ballesteros
Mabuttal West	1,010	942	955	769	773	Ballesteros
Macanaya (Pescaria)	5,121	5,038	4,484	3,802	3,091	Aparri
Macapil	657	612	650	614	618	Piat
Macatel	58	46	59	13	–	Santa Praxedes
Maddalero	1,667	1,642	1,595	1,618	1,524	Buguey
Maddarulug (Santo Domingo)	1,073	819	881	750	535	Solana
Maddarulug Norte	1,192	956	918	782	641	Enrile
Maddarulug Sur	1,885	1,674	1,094	972	778	Enrile
Magacan	811	780	686	569	577	Sanchez-Mira
Magalalag East	1,366	1,118	1,408	1,374	1,272	Enrile
Magalalag West (San Nicolas)	934	1,004	1,008	934	864	Enrile
Magallungon (Santa Teresa)	833	736	748	717	968	Lal-lo
Magapit	2,762	2,667	2,415	2,049	2,355	Lal-lo
Magdalena	783	746	681	579	620	Claveria
Magogod	760	538	601	440	392	Amulung
Magrafil	1,030	1,100	967	802	750	Gonzaga
Magsaysay	1,439	1,404	1,310	1,180	1,023	Lasam
Magsidel	1,617	1,735	1,471	1,198	1,054	Calayan
Maguilling	2,989	2,922	2,662	2,235	2,444	Piat
Maguirig	2,388	2,051	1,967	1,558	1,357	Solana
Mala Este	372	384	385	336	343	Buguey
Mala Weste	1,036	1,032	976	873	872	Buguey
Malabbac	1,528	1,671	1,405	1,342	1,204	Iguig
Malalam-Malacabibi	1,528	1,270	1,234	1,083	1,016	Solana
Malalatan	1,195	1,203	1,188	1,160	1,122	Alcala
Malalinta	863	819	755	612	551	Tuao
Malanao	1,266	1,115	909	891	855	Lal-lo
Malibabag	1,283	1,519	1,523	1,269	1,225	Peñablanca
Malilitao	772	804	703	591	568	Claveria
Malinta	1,079	1,070	980	830	926	Lasam
Malumin	1,650	1,537	1,486	1,440	1,278	Tuao
Maluyo	1,619	1,349	1,173	1,082	1,019	Allacapan
Mambacag	1,117	1,044	888	588	590	Tuao
Manalo	1,134	991	948	577	629	Amulung
Manaoag (Aquiliquilao)	844	915	768	780	708	Iguig
Manga	1,626	1,803	2,035	1,999	1,948	Peñablanca
Mapitac	221	255	252	213	186	Santo Niño (Faire)
Mapurao	1,589	1,432	1,344	1,249	1,214	Allacapan
Maraburab	1,188	1,116	1,103	1,063	937	Alcala
Maracuru	762	804	775	679	595	Enrile
Marede	1,334	1,270	1,313	1,235	1,152	Santa Ana
Marobbob	725	763	618	523	397	Amulung
Marzan	787	835	672	584	533	Sanchez-Mira
Masi	1,892	1,934	1,891	1,652	937	Pamplona
Masi	1,033	1,011	913	765	796	Santa Teresita
Masi (Zinundungan)	716	517	556	569	386	Rizal
Masical	1,621	1,864	1,768	1,663	1,560	Amulung
Masical	1,442	1,393	1,261	1,099	966	Baggao
Masical	380	335	296	266	186	Santo Niño (Faire)
Masin	1,028	960	963	828	668	Alcala
Masisit	1,678	1,642	1,597	1,417	1,553	Sanchez-Mira
Matalao	899	896	775	740	642	Santo Niño (Faire)
Matucay	2,264	2,142	1,744	1,657	1,338	Allacapan
Mauanan	1,010	745	881	996	856	Rizal
Maura	6,256	6,819	6,885	6,737	6,391	Aparri
Maxingal	2,307	2,185	2,138	1,955	1,681	Lal-lo
Minabel	1,691	1,568	1,332	1,186	1,040	Calayan
Minanga	1,631	1,355	1,521	1,408	1,393	Aparri
Minanga	1,693	1,715	1,628	1,488	1,335	Camalaniugan
Minanga	1,533	1,458	1,394	1,306	1,255	Gonzaga
Minanga	2,218	1,391	1,273	993	869	Peñablanca
Minanga	872	921	862	791	716	Piat
Minanga	112	119	66	37	61	Rizal
Minanga Este	1,066	1,224	1,069	962	770	Buguey
Minanga Norte	1,022	1,094	999	950	911	Iguig
Minanga Norte	428	397	335	328	285	Lasam
Minanga Sur	953	1,062	944	838	790	Iguig
Minanga Sur	751	713	685	585	539	Lasam
Minanga Weste	1,407	1,419	1,379	1,258	966	Buguey
Mission	1,598	1,491	1,093	947	920	Santa Teresita
Mocag	2,634	2,485	2,422	2,137	1,862	Baggao
Monte Alegre	1,094	924	924	769	701	Amulung
Mungo	4,658	4,489	4,226	3,974	3,668	Tuao
Nabaccayan	1,764	1,663	1,662	1,520	1,462	Gattaran
Nabannagan East	1,211	1,183	1,111	1,061	1,024	Lasam
Nabannagan West	2,604	2,519	2,199	2,069	1,838	Lasam
Nabbabalayan	943	871	1,033	1,185	1,164	Peñablanca
Nabbialan	1,317	1,323	1,226	1,002	957	Amulung
Nabbotuan	1,235	1,171	1,117	960	810	Solana
Naddungan	1,515	1,488	1,454	1,073	980	Gattaran
Nag-uma	558	562	543	506	451	Santo Niño (Faire)
Nagattatan	1,352	1,277	1,053	1,094	910	Allacapan
Nagattatan	1,443	1,320	1,212	996	931	Pamplona
Nagatutuan	615	445	421	476	318	Gattaran
Nagrangtayan	889	896	982	829	797	Sanchez-Mira
Nagsabaran	317	322	254	217	193	Amulung
Nagsabaran	478	475	393	400	410	Claveria
Nagtupacan	519	472	308	330	295	Pamplona
Naguilian	1,463	1,356	1,356	1,253	1,264	Calayan
Naguilian	1,301	1,389	1,153	919	1,033	Lal-lo
Nambbalan Norte	1,355	1,037	1,245	944	854	Tuguegarao
Nambbalan Sur	623	592	574	493	408	Tuguegarao
Namuac	3,130	3,141	2,795	2,600	2,596	Sanchez-Mira
Namuccayan	1,078	1,046	874	782	783	Santo Niño (Faire)
Nanauatan	428	402	326	353	348	Rizal
Nangalasauan	1,624	1,605	1,441	1,275	1,251	Amulung
Nangalinan	1,502	1,245	1,186	1,122	1,033	Baggao
Nangalisan	2,632	2,321	2,106	1,881	1,648	Solana
Nanguilattan	1,794	1,515	1,085	1,080	982	Peñablanca
Nannarian	1,740	1,471	1,487	1,254	1,230	Peñablanca
Nanuccauan	709	640	603	561	550	Amulung
Nanungaran	632	570	563	538	529	Rizal
Nararagan	1,653	1,690	1,483	1,261	1,233	Ballesteros
Naruangan	2,066	1,958	1,739	1,570	1,266	Tuao
Nassiping	1,048	1,044	920	807	691	Gattaran
Natappian East	2,028	2,127	1,989	1,740	1,646	Solana
Natappian West	2,482	2,634	2,260	2,156	1,865	Solana
Nattanzan (Poblacion)	1,458	1,599	1,485	1,424	1,372	Iguig
Navagan	962	870	813	716	632	Aparri
New Orlins	1,106	1,065	1,004	955	837	Lasam
Newagac	2,005	1,847	1,838	1,738	1,663	Gattaran
Nicolas Agatep	899	884	745	633	604	Lasam
Niug Norte	756	705	630	599	463	Santo Niño (Faire)
Niug Sur	644	683	650	515	636	Santo Niño (Faire)
Pacac	789	793	626	564	462	Allacapan
Pacac-Grande	864	802	749	574	521	Amulung
Pacac-Pequeño	760	754	661	534	501	Amulung
Paddaya	3,374	3,295	2,971	2,730	2,543	Aparri
Paddaya Este	732	658	586	570	469	Buguey
Paddaya Weste	958	882	747	609	518	Buguey
Padul	1,688	1,479	1,477	1,195	1,180	Solana
Pagbangkeruan	668	524	593	577	422	Alcala
Palacu	166	139	161	159	168	Amulung
Palagao Norte	1,943	1,930	1,797	1,613	1,487	Gattaran
Palagao Sur	1,030	940	921	807	806	Gattaran
Palao	1,361	1,213	1,183	969	875	Solana
Palawig	2,461	2,223	1,952	1,877	1,794	Santa Ana
Palayag	1,405	1,497	1,469	1,275	1,366	Amulung
Palca	1,735	1,437	1,439	1,259	1,101	Tuao
Palloc	1,679	1,685	1,524	1,451	1,405	Ballesteros
Pallua Norte	2,391	1,865	1,788	1,630	1,518	Tuguegarao
Pallua Sur	2,469	2,067	1,646	1,199	1,080	Tuguegarao
Palusao	450	453	366	350	313	Santo Niño (Faire)
Parabba	1,453	1,249	1,082	1,027	857	Peñablanca
Paradise (Poblacion)	1,599	1,621	1,522	1,404	1,464	Gonzaga
Paragat	197	151	104	135	119	Camalaniugan
Paranum	525	506	405	373	293	Lal-lo
Pared	602	591	592	534	488	Alcala
Paruddun Norte	1,469	1,394	1,405	1,245	1,205	Aparri
Paruddun Sur	1,075	1,243	1,158	918	1,085	Aparri
Parug-Parug	1,444	1,433	1,447	1,291	1,315	Solana
Pasingan	313	202	194	171	185	Rizal
Pata	1,692	2,159	2,047	1,934	1,874	Tuao
Pata East	991	971	906	806	736	Claveria
Pata West	928	851	789	679	631	Claveria
Patagueleg	555	667	606	585	561	Peñablanca
Pataya	418	482	485	444	426	Solana
Pateng	1,090	881	624	618	521	Gonzaga
Pattao	3,231	3,089	2,966	2,685	2,797	Buguey
Patunungan	1,067	1,060	853	764	681	Santa Ana
Payagan East	1,669	1,653	1,379	1,240	1,377	Ballesteros
Payagan West	562	574	492	480	480	Ballesteros
Pengue (Pengue-Ruyu)	5,222	4,144	3,807	3,163	1,735	Tuguegarao
Peru	1,716	1,807	1,458	1,392	1,284	Lasam
Piggatan	1,544	1,248	1,138	887	813	Alcala
Piña Este	1,033	1,165	899	891	768	Gattaran
Piña Weste	1,384	1,258	1,048	952	875	Gattaran
Pinas	614	598	520	503	353	Claveria
Pinili	683	691	591	525	501	Abulug
Pinopoc	1,677	1,502	1,471	1,309	1,193	Alcala
Plaza	786	727	680	600	575	Aparri
Poblacion	1,026	1,095	1,000	817	709	Calayan
Poblacion	940	739	620	508	437	Rizal
Poblacion (Centro)	3,280	3,391	3,164	2,958	2,954	Baggao
Poblacion I	1,287	1,319	1,377	1,087	979	Piat
Poblacion I (Ward I Centro)	937	988	988	1,042	1,011	Tuao
Poblacion II	1,488	1,389	1,402	1,174	1,179	Piat
Poblacion II (Ward II Centro)	969	957	1,037	1,134	996	Tuao
Portabaga	186	156	151	145	130	Santa Praxedes
Progressive (Poblacion)	2,225	2,086	2,003	1,738	1,633	Gonzaga
Punta	4,437	4,358	4,082	3,993	3,814	Aparri
Pussian	1,208	1,016	978	920	797	Alcala
Quibal	1,879	2,314	2,187	1,743	1,681	Peñablanca
Quinawegan	831	739	828	791	760	Buguey
Rapuli (Punti)	2,622	2,476	1,960	1,694	1,623	Santa Ana
Rebecca (Nagbabalacan)	960	1,002	803	820	805	Gonzaga
Redondo	1,189	1,173	995	883	834	Iguig
Remebella	676	635	447	470	375	Buguey
Remus	2,616	2,443	2,093	2,037	2,143	Baggao
Reyes	2,095	1,868	1,512	1,327	768	Tuguegarao
Roma Norte	1,425	1,220	1,076	996	878	Enrile
Roma Sur	1,198	1,068	912	915	726	Enrile
Rosario	171	176	160	149	7	Lal-lo
Salamague	1,262	1,314	1,185	1,020	1,001	Iguig
Salungsong	145	140	90	95	–	Santa Praxedes
Sampaguita	4,738	4,254	3,804	3,368	2,639	Solana
San Agustin	771	638	651	560	562	Abulug
San Andres	1,262	1,316	1,326	1,120	1,095	Sanchez-Mira
San Antonio	3,824	3,973	3,989	3,904	4,006	Aparri
San Antonio	567	350	217	103	14	Baggao
San Antonio	619	456	515	573	439	Enrile
San Antonio (Lafu)	764	781	751	765	711	Lal-lo
San Antonio (Sayad/Bimekel)	315	306	279	227	274	Claveria
San Carlos	816	761	602	410	455	Gattaran
San Esteban	1,274	1,269	1,113	1,023	1,019	Alcala
San Esteban (Capitan)	1,118	1,176	1,024	835	764	Iguig
San Francisco	2,165	2,119	1,979	1,756	1,493	Baggao
San Gabriel	6,065	7,021	5,926	5,132	4,149	Tuguegarao
San Isidro	989	889	910	854	827	Baggao
San Isidro	768	830	718	558	632	Buguey
San Isidro	365	244	245	198	209	Claveria
San Isidro (Ugac West)	1,099	1,088	993	806	811	Iguig
San Jose	4,057	4,083	4,172	3,990	3,172	Baggao
San Jose	1,379	1,361	1,177	977	1,409	Gonzaga
San Jose	1,139	1,321	1,188	1,059	1,110	Lal-lo
San Juan	1,264	1,105	965	877	698	Ballesteros
San Juan	456	490	492	468	284	Buguey
San Juan	712	621	577	428	357	Lal-lo
San Juan	731	697	656	569	620	Pamplona
San Juan	471	452	359	323	304	Santa Praxedes
San Juan	968	978	910	786	645	Tuao
San Juan (Maguininango)	434	399	323	414	362	Allacapan
San Juan (Zinundungan)	655	527	408	279	205	Rizal
San Julian	627	526	399	409	393	Abulug
San Lorenzo	425	431	358	328	333	Iguig
San Lorenzo	1,228	1,157	1,130	1,045	958	Lal-lo
San Luis (Gurengad)	2,033	1,826	1,752	1,527	1,198	Tuao
San Manuel	815	774	750	692	734	Santo Niño (Faire)
San Mariano	1,399	1,148	634	277	18	Lal-lo
San Miguel	1,431	2,066	2,018	1,556	1,633	Baggao
San Miguel	146	133	101	82	79	Santa Praxedes
San Pedro	1,739	1,644	1,537	1,324	1,246	Lasam
San Roque	144	37	34	101	–	Santo Niño (Faire)
San Roque (Litto)	1,487	1,472	1,492	1,207	1,287	Peñablanca
San Vicente	427	387	290	320	174	Baggao
San Vicente	1,099	1,183	1,085	1,002	874	Buguey
San Vicente	351	358	336	265	269	Claveria
San Vicente	1,550	1,498	1,516	1,449	1,351	Gattaran
San Vicente (Fort)	4,201	4,206	3,009	2,239	2,455	Santa Ana
San Vicente (Maleg)	949	972	885	760	595	Tuao
San Vicente (Ugac East)	1,155	1,255	1,039	889	1,011	Iguig
Sanja	1,553	1,408	1,322	1,046	979	Aparri
Santa Ana	291	283	194	194	226	Gattaran
Santa Barbara	1,361	1,251	1,128	981	899	Iguig
Santa Barbara	1,726	1,808	1,608	1,360	1,223	Piat
Santa Clara	1,731	2,058	1,661	1,049	451	Gonzaga
Santa Clara	1,074	668	776	611	508	Santa Ana
Santa Cruz	3,693	3,507	3,019	2,940	2,836	Ballesteros
Santa Cruz	862	842	715	599	667	Gonzaga
Santa Cruz	2,318	2,187	2,112	1,810	1,773	Pamplona
Santa Cruz	883	537	452	413	420	Santa Ana
Santa Felicitas	408	413	356	382	346	Santo Niño (Faire)
Santa Filomena	1,053	973	929	792	773	Abulug
Santa Isabel	973	975	954	807	606	Buguey
Santa Margarita	4,826	4,013	3,921	3,526	3,549	Baggao
Santa Maria	768	686	629	685	581	Buguey
Santa Maria	782	722	686	663	621	Gattaran
Santa Maria	1,254	1,227	1,128	946	801	Gonzaga
Santa Maria	2,225	2,206	2,414	2,119	2,320	Lal-lo
Santa Maria	267	194	180	173	–	Santo Niño (Faire)
Santa Maria (Surngot)	450	499	501	430	416	Claveria
Santa Rosa	1,344	1,206	1,127	972	–	Abulug
Santa Rosa	656	604	588	497	577	Iguig
Santa Teresa (Gammad Sur)	2,391	2,443	1,131	725	852	Iguig
Santiago	356	371	314	310	236	Claveria
Santiago	190	211	148	113	83	Iguig
Santiago	248	293	293	37	–	Sanchez-Mira
Santo Domingo	2,990	3,122	2,705	2,334	2,322	Piat
Santo Niño (Barbarnis)	292	289	262	200	196	Claveria
Santo Tomas	884	829	763	748	892	Abulug
Santo Tomas	471	475	440	388	432	Claveria
Santo Tomas	1,446	1,282	1,177	1,019	898	Tuao
Santor	1,138	1,133	1,060	1,009	1,082	Baggao
Santor	902	957	746	725	610	Sanchez-Mira
Sapping	983	963	944	972	1,016	Camalaniugan
Sicalao	1,519	1,508	1,221	658	205	Lasam
Sicatna	518	423	439	410	476	Piat
Sicul	37	43	38	41	–	Santa Praxedes
Sidem	591	342	335	276	269	Gattaran
Sidiran	499	491	435	371	310	Santo Niño (Faire)
Siguiran	1,258	1,196	1,200	1,060	1,068	Abulug
Silangan	526	200	366	397	313	Allacapan
Simayung	1,321	1,209	1,001	899	940	Abulug
Simbaluca	492	439	380	307	269	Santa Teresita
Simpatuyo	2,277	2,312	2,096	1,995	1,791	Santa Teresita
Sinicking	470	463	435	434	486	Rizal
Sirit	792	743	710	662	620	Abulug
Sisim	1,481	1,155	1,164	989	904	Peñablanca
Smart (Poblacion)	1,377	1,220	1,380	1,199	1,225	Gonzaga
T. Elizaga (Mabirbira)	236	212	141	173	118	Gattaran
Tabang	1,450	1,544	1,366	1,229	1,208	Santo Niño (Faire)
Tabba	709	735	595	574	660	Pamplona
Tabbac	730	696	584	510	379	Buguey
Tabbugan	496	483	462	350	342	Claveria
Tagao	382	376	292	64	323	Lasam
Tagga	1,310	1,235	1,207	948	902	Tuguegarao
Taggat Norte	1,128	1,120	1,032	892	935	Claveria
Taggat Sur	2,012	2,037	1,645	1,489	1,215	Claveria
Taguing	2,070	2,019	1,915	1,823	1,861	Baggao
Tagum	215	218	221	256	167	Camalaniugan
Tagumay	918	863	879	737	755	Gattaran
Taguntungan	1,378	1,344	1,000	882	803	Baggao
Takiki	520	475	428	424	319	Gattaran
Taligan	586	570	470	432	431	Gattaran
Tallang	2,993	2,776	2,316	2,368	2,061	Baggao
Tallungan	3,285	3,262	2,941	2,675	2,507	Aparri
Tamban	1,613	1,589	1,491	1,454	1,210	Alcala
Tamboli	767	660	589	538	552	Allacapan
Tamucco	574	598	548	608	533	Santo Niño (Faire)
Tana	464	440	488	474	367	Amulung
Tangatan	1,913	1,719	1,460	1,212	1,107	Santa Ana
Tanglagan	1,325	1,091	1,002	803	629	Gattaran
Tanza	4,946	4,771	4,536	4,250	3,536	Tuguegarao
Tapel	2,674	2,646	2,345	2,089	1,887	Gonzaga
Taribubu	1,571	1,542	1,471	1,339	1,104	Tuao
Taytay	1,373	1,301	1,216	1,154	1,244	Baggao
Temblique	891	874	762	697	650	Baggao
Tokitok	943	883	790	730	639	Sanchez-Mira
Toran	3,131	3,204	2,996	2,815	2,654	Aparri
Tubel	479	438	374	361	334	Allacapan
Tubungan Este	392	415	382	315	275	Gattaran
Tubungan Weste	172	250	156	194	212	Gattaran
Tucalan Passing	848	844	737	731	697	Lasam
Tucalana	1,285	1,240	1,146	1,055	1,071	Lal-lo
Tuluttuging	317	197	191	194	137	Camalaniugan
Tungel	1,028	906	814	720	630	Baggao
Tupang	2,221	2,165	2,037	1,946	1,759	Alcala
Tupanna	680	644	513	571	549	Pamplona
Ubong	1,465	1,322	1,348	1,277	1,198	Solana
Ugac Norte	8,122	7,982	7,120	7,111	6,269	Tuguegarao
Ugac Sur	8,810	8,741	7,664	6,759	5,894	Tuguegarao
Unag	626	666	741	700	569	Amulung
Union	749	806	733	651	709	Claveria
Utan	1,195	1,117	1,006	991	853	Allacapan
Viga	720	712	684	523	436	Lasam
Villa	1,900	1,825	1,415	1,470	1,792	Santa Teresita
Villa Cielo	782	683	600	512	407	Buguey
Villa Gracia	801	683	657	674	649	Buguey
Villa Laida	895	827	692	663	599	Tuao
Villa Leonora	743	704	598	563	535	Buguey
Villa Rey (San Gaspar)	994	945	760	639	563	Piat
Villa Reyno	861	831	850	714	799	Piat
Virginia	632	600	546	483	491	Santo Niño (Faire)
Visitacion (Poblacion)	895	753	621	465	413	Santa Ana
Warat	645	576	459	331	305	Piat
Ziminila	1,054	947	972	930	819	Camalaniugan
Zinarag	1,004	979	953	965	906	Aparri
Zitanga	1,560	1,546	1,354	1,244	1,272	Ballesteros
Barangay	2010	2007	2000	1995	1990	City or municipality
*Italicized names are former names.; *Dashes (–) in cells indicate unavailable census data.

[top]
