= Camalaniugan Church Ruins =

Roman Catholic church ruins in Cagayan, Philippines

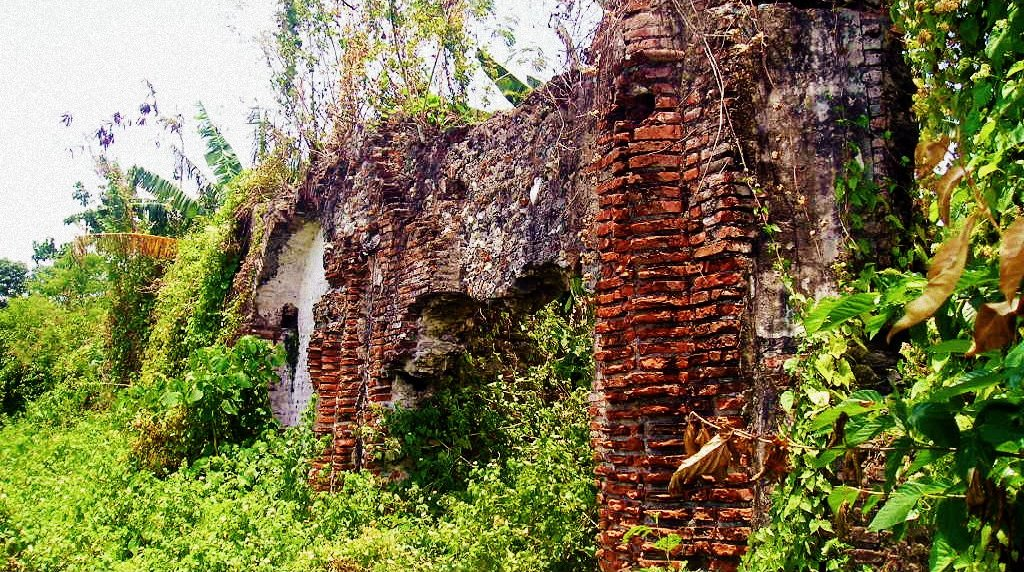
- The church ruins in 2006
- Camalaniugan Church Ruins
- 18°16′15.6738″N 121°40′31.6897″E
- Location: Camalaniugan, Cagayan
- Country: Philippines
- Religious institute: Roman Catholic

History
- Status: Ruins
- Founded: 1596; 430 years ago

Architecture
- Functional status: Inactive
- Heritage designation: National Historical Landmark
- Architectural type: Church building

Camalaniugan Church Ruins are ruins of a Roman Catholic church located in Camalaniugan, Cagayan, Philippines. Built in 1596, the church was dedicated to Hyacinth of Poland, a Dominican priest and saint.

== History ==
The local people of the Camalaniugan were friendly to the Spanish missionaries, which led to the founding of the church in 1596. Overlooking the Cagayan River, the first church was believed to have a roof of thatch.

From the 17th to 19th century, the Camalaniugan Church was damaged by earthquakes, floods, fires and typhoons, and repeatedly repaired. In 1898, a typhoon unroofed the church. However, the church was not repaired after the typhoon as its wall was already crumbling into the river, and a new church was planned to be built in another location away from the river.

== Present ==
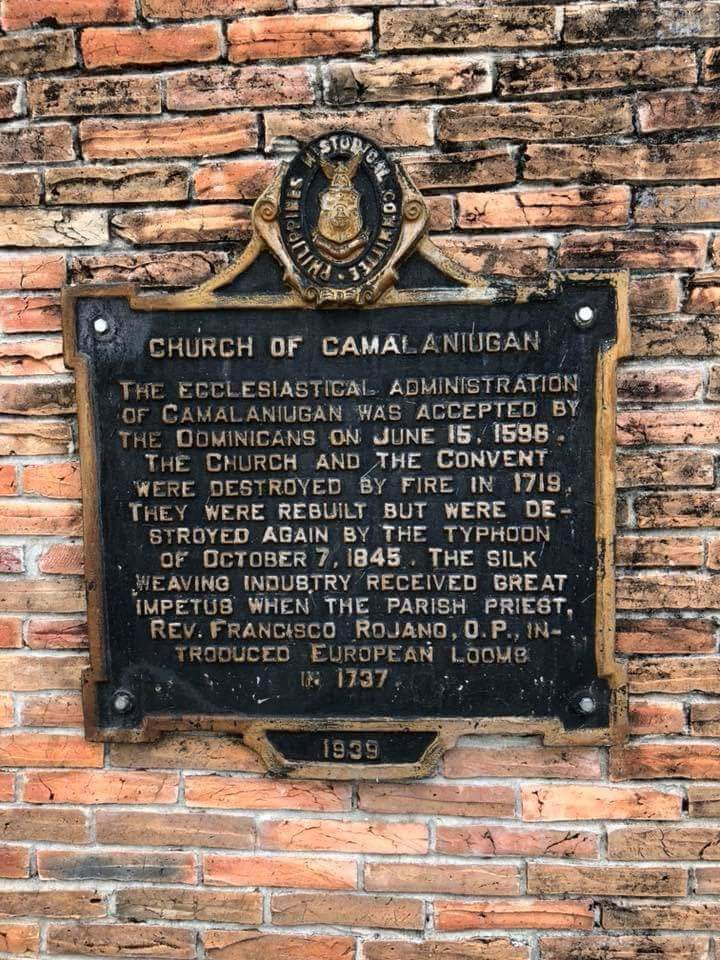
NHC Historical marker installed at the current church building

The National Historical Commission of the Philippines declared the church as a national historical landmark in 1939.

Today, the old church's ruined walls are still visible. In addition, the kiln that was used to produce the bricks for the church is still standing. Between the church ruins and the kiln, the current Camalaniugan Church is located, as well as a new belfry, built in 1998.

=== Artifacts and Structures ===
==== Bell ====
The current Camalaniugan Church houses the oldest bell in the Philippines. The bell was cast in 1595 with "Santa Maria de Binalatoca" inscribed. It was believed to have come from the town of Binalatongan, presently known as San Carlos in Pangasinan. It was brought to Camalaniugan when the town of Binalatongan was burned during the Palaris Revolt in the 18th century.

==== Kiln ====
The kiln that was used to made bricks for rebuilding the church is still standing. It was estimated to have been built in the 18th century.

== Gallery ==
The ruins in 2006

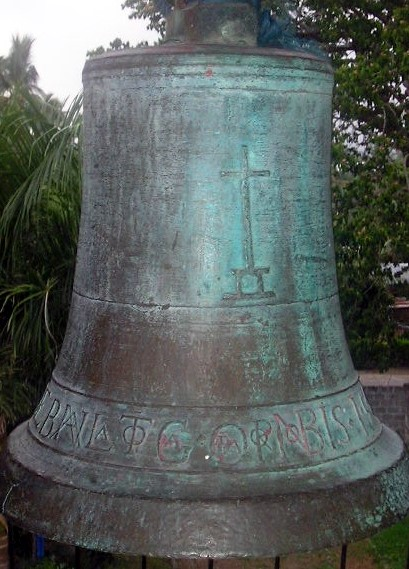
1595 bell

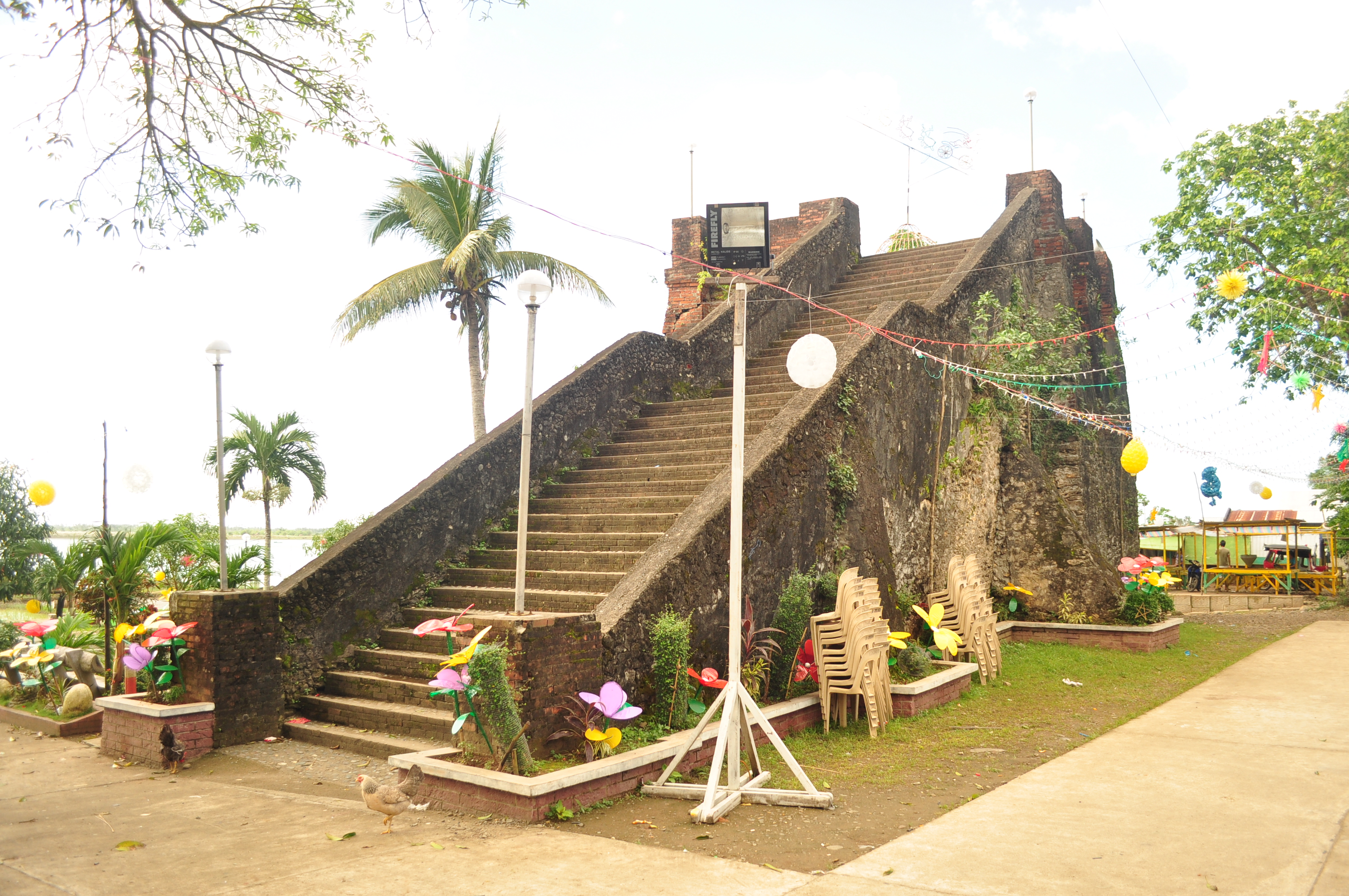
Kiln (horno) for producing bricks

Another view of the kiln

Inside of the kiln
