= Cagayan's 3rd congressional district =

Congressional district in the Philippines

- Constituency for the House of Representatives of the Philippines
- Location of Cagayan within the Philippines
- Province: Cagayan
- Region: Cagayan Valley
- Population: 486,150 (2020)
- Electorate: 284,936 (2022)
- Major settlements: 7 LGUs: City; Tuguegarao; Municipalities; Amulung; Enrile; Iguig; Peñablanca; Solana; Tuao
- Area: 2,322.90 km^{2} (896.88 sq mi)

Current constituency
- Created: 1987
- Representative: Joseph L. Lara
- Political party: Lakas–CMD
- Congressional bloc: Majority

Cagayan's 3rd congressional district is one of the three congressional districts of the Philippines in the province of Cagayan. It has been represented in the House of Representatives of the Philippines since 1987. The district consists of the provincial capital city of Tuguegarao, and adjacent municipalities of Amulung, Enrile, Iguig, Peñablanca, Solana, and Tuao. It is currently represented in the 19th Congress by Joseph L. Lara of the Lakas–CMD.

== Representation history ==
| # | Image | Member | Term of office | | Congress | Party | Electoral history | Constituent LGUs |
| # | Image | Member | Start | End | Congress | Party | Electoral history | Constituent LGUs |
|---|---|---|---|---|---|---|---|---|
District created February 2, 1987.
| 1 | | Tito Dupaya | June 30, 1987 | June 30, 1992 | 8th | LABAN | Elected in 1987. | 1987–present: Amulung, Enrile, Iguig, Peñablanca, Solana, Tuao, Tuguegarao |
| 2 | | Francisco K. Mamba | June 30, 1992 | June 30, 1995 | 9th | Lakas | Elected in 1992. | 1987–present: Amulung, Enrile, Iguig, Peñablanca, Solana, Tuao, Tuguegarao |
| 3 | | Manuel N. Mamba | June 30, 1995 | June 30, 1998 | 10th | Lakas | Elected in 1995. | 1987–present: Amulung, Enrile, Iguig, Peñablanca, Solana, Tuao, Tuguegarao |
| 4 | | Rodolfo E. Aguinaldo | June 30, 1998 | June 12, 2001 | 11th | LAMMP | Elected in 1998; Died. | 1987–present: Amulung, Enrile, Iguig, Peñablanca, Solana, Tuao, Tuguegarao |
| (3) | | Manuel N. Mamba | June 30, 2001 | June 30, 2010 | 12th | Lakas | Elected in 2001. | 1987–present: Amulung, Enrile, Iguig, Peñablanca, Solana, Tuao, Tuguegarao |
| (3) | | Manuel N. Mamba | June 30, 2001 | June 30, 2010 | 13th | Liberal | Re-elected in 2004. | 1987–present: Amulung, Enrile, Iguig, Peñablanca, Solana, Tuao, Tuguegarao |
| (3) | | Manuel N. Mamba | June 30, 2001 | June 30, 2010 | 14th | Liberal | Re-elected in 2007. | 1987–present: Amulung, Enrile, Iguig, Peñablanca, Solana, Tuao, Tuguegarao |
| 5 | | Randolph S. Ting | June 30, 2010 | June 30, 2019 | 15th | Lakas | Elected in 2010. | 1987–present: Amulung, Enrile, Iguig, Peñablanca, Solana, Tuao, Tuguegarao |
| 5 | | Randolph S. Ting | June 30, 2010 | June 30, 2019 | 16th | NUP | Re-elected in 2013. | 1987–present: Amulung, Enrile, Iguig, Peñablanca, Solana, Tuao, Tuguegarao |
| 5 | | Randolph S. Ting | June 30, 2010 | June 30, 2019 | 17th | NUP | Re-elected in 2016. | 1987–present: Amulung, Enrile, Iguig, Peñablanca, Solana, Tuao, Tuguegarao |
| 6 | | Joseph L. Lara | June 30, 2019 | Incumbent | 18th | PDP–Laban | Elected in 2019. | 1987–present: Amulung, Enrile, Iguig, Peñablanca, Solana, Tuao, Tuguegarao |
| 6 | | Joseph L. Lara | June 30, 2019 | Incumbent | 19th | Lakas | Re-elected in 2022. | 1987–present: Amulung, Enrile, Iguig, Peñablanca, Solana, Tuao, Tuguegarao |

== Election results ==
=== 2016 ===
2016 Philippine House of Representatives elections
| Party | Candidate | Votes | % |
|---|---|---|---|
| NUP | Randolph Ting | 105,060 | 52.67 |
| Liberal | Toto Guzman | 50,253 | 25.20 |
| UNA | Isarco Antonio | 5,449 | 2.73 |
| Independent | Carmelo Lasam | 4,419 | 2.22 |
| Valid ballots | | 165,181 | 82.82 |
| Invalid or blank votes | | 34,275 | 17.18 |
| Total votes | | 199,456 | 100.00 |
| NUP hold | | | |

=== 2013 ===
2013 Philippine House of Representatives elections
| Party | Candidate | Votes | % |
|---|---|---|---|
| NUP | Randolph Ting | 90,537 | 61.61 |
| Liberal | Raymund Guzman | 32,750 | 22.29 |
| Valid ballots | | 123,287 | 83.90 |
| Invalid or blank votes | | 23,659 | 16.10 |
| Total votes | | 146,946 | 100.00 |
| NUP hold | | | |

=== 2010 ===
2010 Philippine House of Representatives elections
| Party | Candidate | Votes | % |
|---|---|---|---|
| Lakas–Kampi | Randolph Ting | 106,048 | 64.28 |
| Liberal | Francisco Mamba, Jr. | 58,934 | 35.72 |
| Valid ballots | | 164,982 | 95.40 |
| Invalid or blank votes | | 7,962 | 4.60 |
| Total votes | | 172,944 | 100.00 |
| Lakas–Kampi gain from Liberal | | | |

== See also ==
- Legislative districts of Cagayan
