= Baggao =

Municipality in Cagayan, Philippines

- Municipality
- Municipality of Baggao
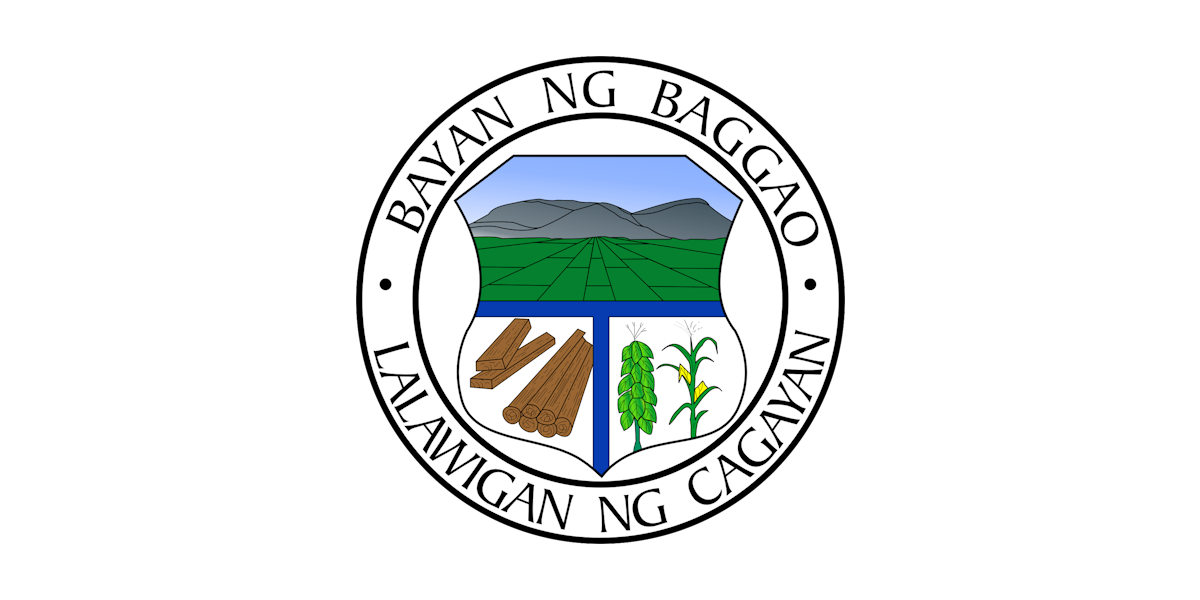
- Flag Seal

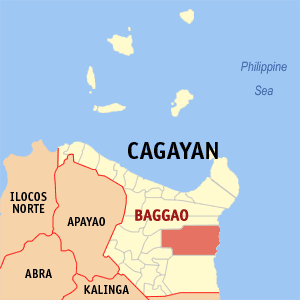
- Map of Cagayan with Baggao highlighted
- Interactive map of Baggao
- Location within the Philippines
- Coordinates: 17°56′05″N 121°46′24″E
- Country: Philippines
- Region: Cagayan Valley
- Province: Cagayan
- District: 1st district
- Barangays: 48 (see Barangays)

Government
  - Type: Sangguniang Bayan
  - Mayor: Leonardo Pattung, MD
  - Vice Mayor: Rowel B. Gazmen
  - Representative: Ramon C. Nolasco Jr.
  - Municipal Council: Members: Mariano L. Miguel Jr.; Arnel R. Atalip; Jaime E. Ramos Jr.; Virginia Loreta T. Herrero; Lilibeth C. Ulep; Roy F. Dumayag; Oscar D. Buraga Jr.; Edmundo B. delos Santos Jr.
  - Electorate: 50,449 voters (2025)

Area
  - Total: 920.60 km^{2} (355.45 sq mi)
- Elevation: 51 m (167 ft)
- Highest elevation: 172 m (564 ft)
- Lowest elevation: 8 m (26 ft)

Population (2024 census)
  - Total: 90,723
  - Density: 98.548/km^{2} (255.24/sq mi)
  - Households: 21,486

Economy
  - Income class: 1st municipal income class
  - Poverty incidence: 9.97% (2023)
  - Revenue: ₱ 537.3 million (2024)
  - Assets: ₱ 1,543 million (2024)
  - Expenditure: ₱ 519.5 million (2024)
  - Liabilities: ₱ 305.9 million (2024)

Service provider
  - Electricity: Cagayan 1 Electric Cooperative (CAGELCO 1)
- Time zone: UTC+8 (PST)
- ZIP code: 3506
- PSGC: 0201506000
- IDD : area code: +63 (0)78
- Native languages: Ibanag; Ilocano; Cagayan Agta; Dupaningan Agta; Tagalog

Baggao, officially the Municipality of Baggao (Ibanag: Ili nat Baggao; Ilocano: Ili ti Baggao; Tagalog: Bayan ng Baggao), is a municipality in the province of Cagayan, Philippines. According to the 2024 census, it has a population of 90,723 people.

== Etymology ==
The name Baggao is derived from the Ibanag word which means washing in the English language. Old folks recount that the Ibanags who frequently hunted in the locality, used to wash their catch before taking them home in a big mud hole which they called Abbagaoan, an Ibanag word which refers to a place to wash. Eventually, the area became a noted landmark for hunters from which the name of the municipality was derived.

== History ==
Long before the issuance of the Royal Decree which officially detached Baggao as a barrio of Amulung on November 27, 1896, the place had already become famous as a hunting ground. It was detached from Amulung to become a separate Spanish mission.

With the formal creation of Baggao as a separate municipality, Rev. Fr. Pedro Vicandi, O.P. who was then the Parish Priest of the area, was designated officer-in-charge of the town. His chapel, and at the same time, the town hall consisted of a shack made of bamboo and cogon built atop of a hill one kilometer southeast of the present municipal building.

On April 18, 1899, Fr. Vicandi fled the area when Col. Daniel Tirona, under Gen. E. Aguinaldo, visited the Town and put to flame the friar's shanty. However, in September 1899, when civil order was finally restored, Don Rafael Catolico took over as the first mayor of the New “Pueblo Civil”.

For more than 85 years since it was separated from its mother town of Amulung, the seat of the Municipal Government of Baggao has been seated at the Centro or Poblacion. In 1899, when Don Rafael Catolico took over as the first mayor of the new “Pueblo Civil” there were 5,051 inhabitants living in sparse settlements. The communities given the official status as a barrio were those immediately surrounding the Poblacion. Most of the barangays, now established upstream were merely patches of forest clearings barely making the requirements of becoming a full-fledge barrio.

However, with the continuous influx of immigrants from other towns and provinces, new communities sprouted continuously moving further northeastward to the more fertile expanse of this virgin municipality. As of today there are already 48 barangays settled by 85% of the more than 82,302 inhabitants along the north-eastern portion of Baggao, the nearest of which is no less than 16 kilometers to the Poblacion, while the farthest of the 12 barangays immediately surrounding the Centro is no more than 10 kilometers away.

The Poblacion (Centro) founded a century ago became a dead center today. Basing on the context of “ripple effect” approach of development, the site of the municipal government of Baggao became misplaced and unstrategically located as its pivotal role of development. The townsite, in fact, has caused an upsurge of factionalism and a desire of the people to split the municipality into two. In so doing, the Municipal Development Council arrived at a general consensus of selecting San Jose, the most progressive barangay of the town, as the next seat of the municipal government of Baggao. Hence in 1985, public hearings led by Mayor Virgilio G. Herrero were conducted throughout the different barangays of Baggao where 85% of the population expressed their support to the move. So, in a session conducted by the Sangguniang Bayan of Baggao, the members passed a resolution transferring the site of the seat of municipal government of Baggao from the old site in Poblacion to its new location in barangay San Jose.

== Geography ==
Baggao is situated 46 kilometres (29 mi) from the provincial capital Tuguegarao, and 531.15 kilometres (330.04 mi) from the country's capital city of Manila.

=== Barangays ===
Baggao is politically subdivided into 48 barangays. Each barangay consists of puroks while some have sitios.

- Adaoag
- Agaman
- Agaman Norte
- Agaman Sur
- Alba
- Annayatan
- Asassi
- Asinga-Via
- Awallan
- Bacagan
- Bagunot
- Barsat East
- Barsat West
- Bitag Grande
- Bitag Pequeño
- Bunugan
- C. Verzosa
- Canagatan
- Carupian
- Catugay
- Dabbac Grande
- Dalin
- Dalla
- Hacienda Intal
- Ibulo
- Immurung
- J. Pallagao
- Lasilat
- Mabini
- Masical
- Mocag
- Nangalinan
- Remus
- Poblacion
- San Antonio
- San Francisco
- San Isidro
- San Jose
- San Miguel
- San Vicente
- Santa Margarita
- Santor
- Taguing
- Taguntungan
- Tallang
- Taytay
- Temblique
- Tungel

=== Climate ===
Climate data for Baggao, Cagayan
Month	Jan	Feb	Mar	Apr	May	Jun	Jul	Aug	Sep	Oct	Nov	Dec	Year
Mean daily maximum °C (°F)	24 (75)	25 (77)	28 (82)	31 (88)	31 (88)	31 (88)	30 (86)	30 (86)	29 (84)	28 (82)	26 (79)	24 (75)	28 (83)
Mean daily minimum °C (°F)	20 (68)	20 (68)	21 (70)	23 (73)	24 (75)	24 (75)	24 (75)	24 (75)	24 (75)	23 (73)	23 (73)	21 (70)	23 (73)
Average precipitation mm (inches)	150 (5.9)	106 (4.2)	84 (3.3)	48 (1.9)	103 (4.1)	115 (4.5)	134 (5.3)	156 (6.1)	136 (5.4)	240 (9.4)	246 (9.7)	300 (11.8)	1,818 (71.6)
Average rainy days	19	14.3	12.8	10.8	17.7	18.9	21.5	23.3	22.1	20.4	20.3	22.2	223.3
Source: Meteoblue

== Demographics ==
Population census of Baggao

Year	Pop.	±% p.a.
1903	3,857	—
1918	6,727	+3.78%
1939	11,602	+2.63%
1948	11,232	−0.36%
1960	21,597	+5.60%
1970	36,471	+5.37%
1975	41,011	+2.38%
1980	44,081	+1.45%

Year	Pop.	±% p.a.
1990	55,264	+2.29%
1995	60,060	+1.57%
2000	66,264	+2.13%
2007	73,048	+1.35%
2010	78,188	+2.51%
2015	82,782	+1.09%
2020	87,753	+1.23%
2024	90,723	+0.80%

Source: Philippine Statistics Authority

In the 2024 census, the population of Baggao was 90,723 people, with a density of 99 inhabitants per square kilometre or 260 inhabitants per square mile.

== Economy ==
Poverty incidence of Baggao (%)

Source: Philippine Statistics Authority

== Government ==
=== Local government ===
Baggao is part of the first legislative district of the province of Cagayan. It is governed by a mayor, designated as its local chief executive, and by a municipal council as its legislative body in accordance with the Local Government Code. The mayor, vice mayor, and the councilors are elected directly by the people through an election which is being held every three years.

The current seat of the municipal government is situated in barangay San Jose.

=== Elected officials ===
Members of the Municipal Council (2025–2028)
Position	Name
Congressman	Ramon C. Nolasco Sr.
Mayor	Leonardo C. Pattung
Vice-Mayor	Rowel B. Gazmen
Councilors	Arnold A. Alonzo
Councilors	Edmundo B. Delos Santos Jr.
Councilors	Ron Paolo J. Pattung
Councilors	Johny R. Bacud
Councilors	Roy D. Tumaneng
Councilors	Engr. Roy F. Dumayag
Councilors	Alexander M. Gaspar
Councilors	Mariano L. Miguel

==== Roster of Local Chief Executives since November 27, 1896 ====
1. Fray Pedro Vicandi, O.P. - 1896 - 1899
2. Don Rafael Catolico - 1899 - 1904
3. Juan Canillas - 1904 - 1908
4. Benito Reboredo - 1908 - 1912
5. Cipriano - 1912 - 1916
6. Vicente Garcia - 1916 - 1920
7. Jose Pallagao - 1920 - 1921
8. Roman Canillas - 1921 - 1924
9. Francisco Mendoza - 1924 - 1928
10. Alejo Siazon - 1928 - 1932
11. Isabelo Tobias - 1932 - 1940
12. Don Domingo G. Herrero - 1940 - 1944
13. Pastor Lorenzo - 1944 - 1945
14. Walfrido Pallagao - 1945 - 1946
15. Custavo Cruz Sr. - 1946 - 1947
16. Angel Canillas - 1947 - 1956
17. Felix Villanueva - 1956 - 1960
18. Walfrido Pallagao - 1960 - 1978
19. Virgilio Gasa Herrero - 1978 - Marso 1987
20. Dante S. Ramirez, M.D. - Marso 1987 to Nobyembre 30, 1987
21. Virgilio H. Navarro - Disyembre 01, 1987 to Pebrero 02, 1988
22. Virgilio Gasa Herrero - Pebrero 03, 1988 to Marso 27, 1998
23. Emely D. Carmona. - Marso 28, 1998 to Hunyo 30, 1998
24. Leonardo C. Pattung, M.D. - Hulyo 1, 1998 to Hunyo 30, 2007
25. Rolando T. Uanang - Hulyo 1, 2007 to date Hunyo 30,2010
26. Leonardo C. Pattung, M.D. - Hulyo 1, 2010 to Hunyo 30, 2019
27. Joan C. Dunuan, MPA, LLB - Hulyo 1, 2019 to Hunyo 30, 2022
28. Leonardo C. Pattung, M.D. - Hulyo 1, 2022 to Present

== Education ==
The Schools Division of Cagayan governs the town's public education system. The division office is a field office of the DepEd in Cagayan Valley region. There are two schools district offices that govern both the public and private elementary and high schools throughout the municipality. These are Baggao North District, and Baggo West District.

=== Primary and elementary schools ===
- Adaoag Elementary School
- Agaman Norte Elementary School
- Agaman Proper Elementary School
- Agaman Sur Elementary School
- Alba Elementary School
- Asassi Elementary School
- Baggao North Central School
- Baggao West Central School
- Bagunot Elementary School
- Bitag Grande Elementary School
- Bunugan Elementary School
- C. Verzosa Elementary School
- Callao Elementary School
- Camunayan Elementary School
- Canagatan Elementary School
- Carupian Elementary School
- Catugay Elementary School
- Daligadig Elementary School
- Dalin Elementary School
- Ibulo Primary School
- Linawan Elementary School
- Malisi (Km. 12) Primary School
- Mansarong Elementary School
- Masical Elementary School
- Masisit Elementary School
- Pallagao Elementary School
- Remus Elementary School
- San Vicente Elementary School
- Sta. Margarita East Elementary School
- Sta. Margarita West Elementary School
- Tabugan Elementary School
- Taguntungan Elementary School
- Temblique Elementary School
- Tueg Elementary School
- United Methodist Christian School

=== Secondary schools ===
- Agaman National High School
- Baggao National Agricultural School
- Sta. Margarita National High School
- Baggao National High School
- Taguing Integrated School
- San Isidro Integrated School
- Awallan Integrated School
- Valley Cove Integrated Schoo

== Media ==
- 90.1 MHz DWVY Radyo Cagayano
