= Amulung =

Municipality in Cagayan, Philippines

- Municipality
- Municipality of Amulung
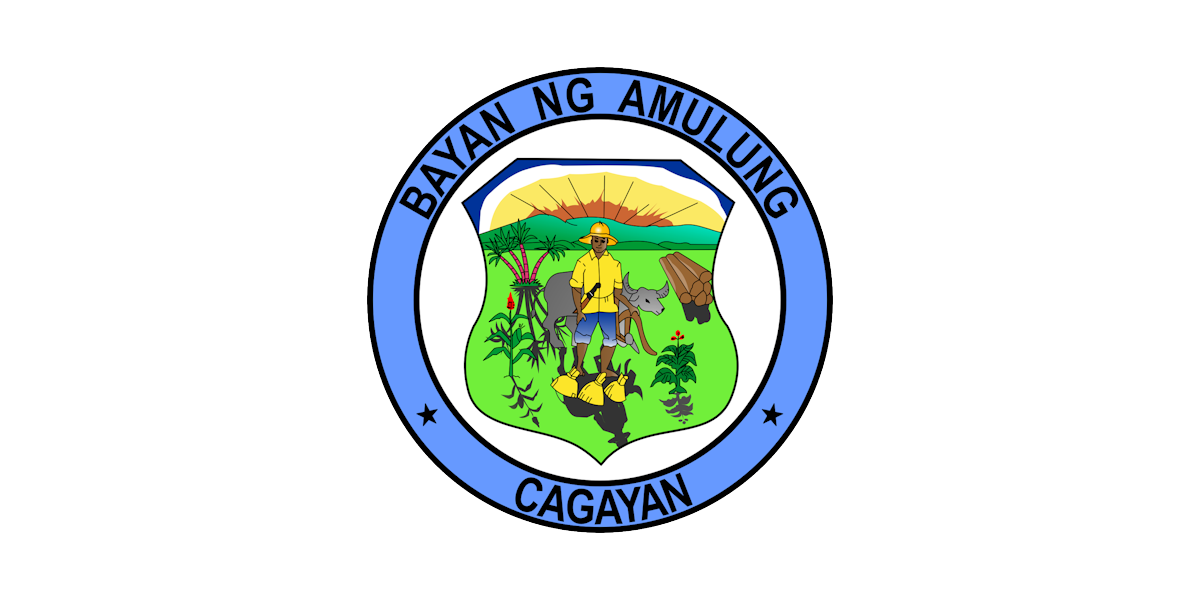
- Flag Seal

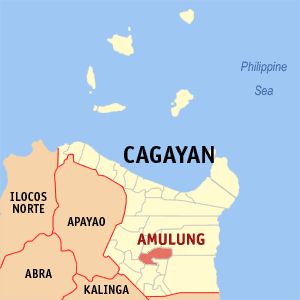
- Map of Cagayan with Amulung highlighted
- Interactive map of Amulung
- Location within the Philippines
- Coordinates: 17°50′19″N 121°43′25″E
- Country: Philippines
- Region: Cagayan Valley
- Province: Cagayan
- District: 3rd district
- Barangays: 47 (see Barangays)

Government
  - Type: Sangguniang Bayan
  - Mayor: Elpidio R. Rendon
  - Vice Mayor: Edward Antonio
  - Representative: Joseph L. Lara
  - Electorate: 32,964 voters (2025)

Area
  - Total: 242.20 km^{2} (93.51 sq mi)
- Elevation: 21 m (69 ft)
- Highest elevation: 85 m (279 ft)
- Lowest elevation: 7 m (23 ft)

Population (2024 census)
  - Total: 50,903
  - Density: 210.17/km^{2} (544.34/sq mi)
  - Households: 11,891

Economy
  - Income class: 1st municipal income class
  - Poverty incidence: 12.11% (2023)
  - Revenue: ₱ 258.2 million (2024)
  - Assets: ₱ 820.7 million (2024)
  - Expenditure: ₱ 264.8 million (2024)
  - Liabilities: ₱ 86.51 million (2024)

Service provider
  - Electricity: Cagayan 1 Electric Cooperative (CAGELCO 1)
- Time zone: UTC+8 (PST)
- ZIP code: 3505
- PSGC: 0201504000
- IDD : area code: +63 (0)78
- Native languages: Ibanag; Ilocano; Itawis; Tagalog

Amulung, officially the Municipality of Amulung, is a municipality in the province of Cagayan, Philippines. According to the 2024 census, it has a population of 50,903 people.

== Etymology ==
Amulung, officially the Municipality of Amulung, is a municipality in the province of Cagayan, Philippines. According to the 2024 census, it has a population of 50,903 people.

== History ==
Former flag of Amulung

Formerly administered from Iguig, Amulung was formally established on 10 May 1734 by the Spaniards as a stopover along the Cagayan River.

== Geography ==
Amulung is situated 26.51 kilometres (16.47 mi) from the provincial capital Tuguegarao, and 511.66 kilometres (317.93 mi) from the country's capital city of Manila.

== Barangays ==
Amulung is politically subdivided into 47 barangays. Each barangay consists of puroks while some have sitios.

- Abolo
- Agguirit
- Alitungtung
- Annabuculan
- Annafatan
- Anquiray
- Babayuan
- Baccuit
- Bacring
- Baculud
- Balauini
- Bauan
- Bayabat
- Calamagui
- Calintaan
- Caratacat
- Casingsingan Norte
- Casingsingan Sur
- Catarauan
- Centro
- Concepcion
- Cordova
- Dadda
- Dafunganay
- Dugayung
- Estefania
- Gabut
- Gangauan
- Goran
- Jurisdiccion
- La Suerte
- Logung
- Magogod
- Manalo
- Marobbob
- Masical
- Monte Alegre
- Nabbialan
- Nagsabaran
- Nangalasauan
- Nanuccauan
- Pacac-Grande
- Pacac-Pequeño
- Palacu
- Palayag
- Tana
- Unag

== Climate ==
Climate data for Amulung, Cagayan
Month	Jan	Feb	Mar	Apr	May	Jun	Jul	Aug	Sep	Oct	Nov	Dec	Year
Mean daily maximum °C (°F)	24 (75)	25 (77)	28 (82)	31 (88)	31 (88)	31 (88)	30 (86)	30 (86)	29 (84)	28 (82)	26 (79)	24 (75)	28 (83)
Mean daily minimum °C (°F)	20 (68)	20 (68)	21 (70)	23 (73)	24 (75)	24 (75)	24 (75)	24 (75)	24 (75)	23 (73)	23 (73)	21 (70)	23 (73)
Average precipitation mm (inches)	150 (5.9)	106 (4.2)	84 (3.3)	48 (1.9)	103 (4.1)	115 (4.5)	134 (5.3)	156 (6.1)	136 (5.4)	240 (9.4)	246 (9.7)	300 (11.8)	1,818 (71.6)
Average rainy days	19	14.3	12.8	10.8	17.7	18.9	21.5	23.3	22.1	20.4	20.3	22.2	223.3
Source: Meteoblue

== Demographics ==
Population census of Amulung
Year	Pop.	±% p.a.
1903	6,234	—
1918	8,077	+1.74%
1939	12,295	+2.02%
1948	12,734	+0.39%
1960	18,415	+3.12%
1970	24,283	+2.80%
1975	25,732	+1.17%
1980	29,079	+2.47%
1990	35,116	+1.90%
1995	37,744	+1.36%
2000	42,754	+2.71%
2007	44,367	+0.51%
2010	45,182	+0.66%
2015	47,860	+1.10%
2020	50,336	+1.07%
2024	50,903	+0.27%
Source: Philippine Statistics Authority

In the 2024 census, the population of Amulung was 50,903 people, with a density of 210 inhabitants per square kilometre or 540 inhabitants per square mile.

== Economy ==
Poverty incidence of Amulung (%)

Source: Philippine Statistics Authority

== Government ==
=== Local government ===
Amulung is part of the third legislative district of the province of Cagayan. It is governed by a mayor, who serves as the local chief executive, and a municipal council (Sangguing Bayan), which serves as the legislative body in accordance with the local government code. The mayor, vice mayor, and councilors are elected directly by the people through an election held every three years.

=== Elected officials ===
Members of the Municipal Council (2022-2025)
Position	Name
Congressman	Joseph L. Lara
Mayor	Elpidio R. Rendon
Vice-mayor	Edward Antonio
Councilors	Mark Anthony Baculi
Councilors	Marcian Francisco B. Donato
Councilors	Mark Aljohn Pascual
Councilors	Boyet Marcos
Councilors	Nicano De Leon II
Councilors	Jong Malamug
Councilors	Amor M. Pasimio
Councilors	Bong Zalun

== Education ==
The Schools Division of Cagayan governs the town's public education system. The division office is a field office of the DepEd in Cagayan Valley region. There are two schools district offices that govern the public and private elementary and high schools throughout the municipality. These are Amulung East District, and Amulung West District.

=== Primary and elementary schools ===
- Abolo Elementary School
- Agguirit Elementary School
- Alituntung Elementary School
- Amulung East Central School
- Annafatan Elementary School
- Anquiray Elementary School
- Babayuan Elementary School
- Baccuit Elementary School
- Bacring Elementary School
- Baculud Elementary School
- Bayabat Elementary School
- Calamagui Elementary School
- Calintaan Elementary School
- Caratacat Elementary School
- Casingsingan Norte Elementary School
- Casingsingan Sur Elementary School
- Catarauan Elementary School
- Concepcion Elementary School
- Cordova Central School
- Dadda Elementary School
- Dugayung-Jurisdiccion Elementary School
- Estefania Elementary School
- Gabut Elementary School
- Gangauan Elementary School
- Goran Elementary School
- La Suerte Elementary School
- Logung Elementary School
- Magogod Elementary School
- Manalo Elementary School
- Marobbob Elementary School
- Masical Elementary School
- Monte Alegre Elementary School
- Nabbialan Elementary School
- Nagsabaran Elementary School
- Nangalasauan Elementary School
- Nanuccauan Elementary School
- Pacac Grande Tana Elementary School
- Pacac Pequeno Elementary School
- Palayag Elementary School
- San Juan Elementary School
- Unag-Annabuculan Elementary School
- Waig Elementary School

=== Secondary schools ===
- Amulung National High School
- Amulung National High School - Baculud Ext.
- Bayabat National High School
- Bayabat National High School - La Suerte Ext.
- Cordova National High School
- Dadda National High School
- Lyceum de Amulung
- Our Lady of Victories Academy
- Pacac Grande National High School
