= Buguey =

Municipality in Cagayan, Philippines

- Municipality
- Municipality of Buguey
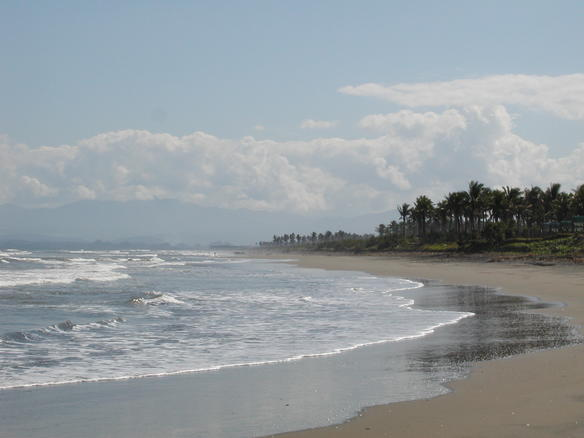
- Beach at Buguey

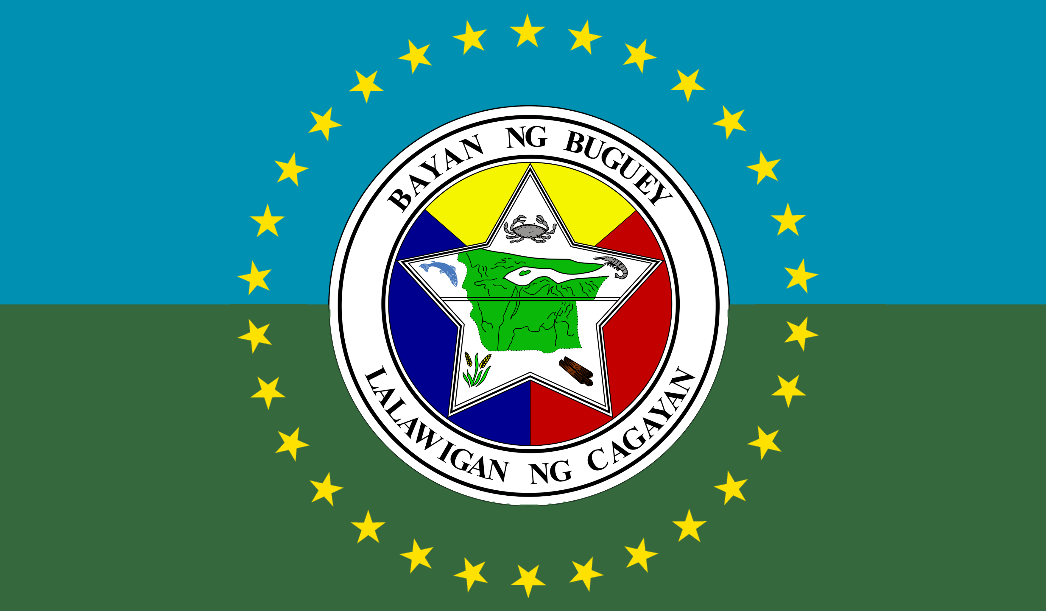
- Flag Seal
- Nickname: Crab Capital of the North
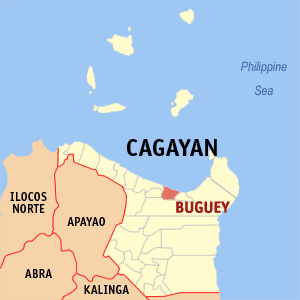
- Map of Cagayan with Buguey highlighted
- Interactive map of Buguey
- Location within the Philippines
- Coordinates: 18°17′18″N 121°49′59″E
- Country: Philippines
- Region: Cagayan Valley
- Province: Cagayan
- District: 1st district
- Barangays: 30 (see Barangays)

Government
  - Type: Sangguniang Bayan
  - Mayor: Licerio M. Antiporda III
  - Vice Mayor: Lloyd M. Antiporda
  - Representative: Ramon C. Nolasco Jr.
  - Electorate: 20,434 voters (2025)

Area
  - Total: 164.50 km^{2} (63.51 sq mi)
- Elevation: 2.0 m (6.6 ft)
- Highest elevation: 43 m (141 ft)
- Lowest elevation: −1 m (−3.3 ft)

Population (2024 census)
  - Total: 32,351
  - Density: 196.66/km^{2} (509.35/sq mi)
  - Households: 7,658

Economy
  - Income class: 2nd municipal income class
  - Poverty incidence: 9.26% (2023)
  - Revenue: ₱ 190.9 million (2024)
  - Assets: ₱ 391.7 million (2024)
  - Expenditures: ₱ 190 million (2024)
  - Liabilities: ₱ 85.31 million (2024)

Service provider
  - Electricity: Cagayan 2 Electric Cooperative (CAGELCO 2)
- Time zone: UTC+8 (PST)
- ZIP code: 3511
- PSGC: 0201508000
- IDD : area code: +63 (0)78
- Native languages: Ibanag; Ilocano; Tagalog

Buguey, officially the Municipality of Buguey (Ibanag: Ili na Buguey; Ilocano: Ili ti Buguey; Tagalog: Bayan ng Buguey), is a municipality in the province of Cagayan, Philippines. According to the 2024 census, it has a population of 32,351 people.

== History ==
The site of Buguey was originally called catagayan, a place of many tagay trees. The name came about after Spanish conquistador Juan de Salcedo asked a native what the name of the place was in 1572. Subsequently, the name was shortened to Cagayan, which later became the name for the entire province and region.

Buguey is believed to have originated from the Ibanag word Bugay which means "shipwreck". It was formally established as a Spanish mission in 1596. In 1771, it was raided by Moro vessels from Jolo. According to legend, the Moros looted the town's church and brought its bell with them to sea, whereupon their vessel capsized, leading residents to shout navugay ira (they have capsized).

== Geography ==
Buguey is situated 104.08 kilometres (64.67 mi) from the provincial capital Tuguegarao, and 589.23 kilometres (366.13 mi) from the country's capital city of Manila. It lies along the Buguey Lagoon, one of the largest estuaries in Cagayan.

=== Barangays ===
Buguey is politically subdivided into 30 barangays. Each barangay consists of puroks while some have sitios.

- Ballang
- Balza
- Cabaritan
- Calamegatan
- Centro (Poblacion)
- Centro West
- Dalaya
- Fula
- Leron
- M.Antiporda
- Maddalero
- Mala Este
- Mala Weste
- Minanga Este
- Paddaya Este
- Pattao
- Quinawegan
- Remebella
- San Isidro
- Santa Isabel
- Santa Maria
- Tabbac
- Villa Cielo
- Alucao Weste (San Lorenzo)
- Minanga Weste
- Paddaya Weste
- San Juan
- San Vicente
- Villa Gracia
- Villa Leonora

=== Climate ===
Climate data for Buguey, Cagayan
Month	Jan	Feb	Mar	Apr	May	Jun	Jul	Aug	Sep	Oct	Nov	Dec	Year
Mean daily maximum °C (°F)	24 (75)	26 (79)	28 (82)	31 (88)	31 (88)	31 (88)	30 (86)	30 (86)	29 (84)	28 (82)	26 (79)	25 (77)	28 (83)
Mean daily minimum °C (°F)	21 (70)	21 (70)	21 (70)	23 (73)	24 (75)	24 (75)	24 (75)	24 (75)	24 (75)	23 (73)	23 (73)	22 (72)	23 (73)
Average precipitation mm (inches)	150 (5.9)	106 (4.2)	84 (3.3)	48 (1.9)	103 (4.1)	115 (4.5)	134 (5.3)	156 (6.1)	136 (5.4)	240 (9.4)	246 (9.7)	300 (11.8)	1,818 (71.6)
Average rainy days	19	14.3	12.8	10.8	17.7	18.9	21.5	23.3	22.1	20.4	20.3	22.2	223.3
Source: Meteoblue

== Demographics ==
Population census of Buguey

Year	Pop.	±% p.a.
1903	3,433	—
1918	8,943	+6.59%
1939	14,293	+2.26%
1948	14,530	+0.18%
1960	20,475	+2.90%
1970	17,571	−1.52%
1975	19,926	+2.55%
1980	21,237	+1.28%

Year	Pop.	±% p.a.
1990	22,889	+0.75%
1995	25,058	+1.71%
2000	26,401	+1.13%
2007	28,129	+0.88%
2010	28,455	+0.42%
2015	30,175	+1.12%
2020	32,148	+1.34%
2024	32,351	+0.15%

Source: Philippine Statistics Authority

In the 2024 census, the population of Buguey was 32,351 people, with a density of 200 inhabitants per square kilometre or 520 inhabitants per square mile.

== Economy ==
Poverty incidence of Buguey (%)

Source: Philippine Statistics Authority

The town's aquaculture, particularly the crab industry, is supported by the Buguey Lagoon, leading Buguey to be called the "Crab Capital of the Philippines" by the Department of Agriculture.

== Government ==
=== Local government ===
Buguey is part of the first legislative district of the province of Cagayan. It is governed by a mayor, designated as its local chief executive, and by a municipal council as its legislative body in accordance with the Local Government Code. The mayor, vice mayor, and the municipal councilors are elected directly by the people through an election that is held every three years.

=== Elected officials ===
Members of the Municipal Council (2019–2022)
Position	Name
Congressman	Ramon C. Nolasco Jr.
Mayor	Licerio M. Antiporda III
Vice-Mayor	Lloyd M. Antiporda
Councilors	Erika Llyn B. Antiporda
Councilors	Leeve Christopher M. Antiporda
Councilors	Randolph A. Taloza
Councilors	John Alex M. Miranda
Councilors	Gilbert C. Goze
Councilors	Abraham T. Alariao Jr.
Councilors	Nerlita B. Taruc
Councilors	Renato R. Alariao

== Education ==
The Schools Division of Cagayan governs the town's public education system. The division office is a field office of the DepEd in Cagayan Valley region. The Buguey North District Office governs the public and private elementary and high schools throughout the municipality.

=== Primary and secondary schools ===
- Balza Elementary School
- Buguey North Central School
- Cabaritan Elementary School
- Centro West Elementary School
- Leron Elementary School
- Mala Este Primary School
- Mala Weste Elementary School
- Minanga Elementary School
- Paddaya Elementary School
- Paddaya Este Elementary School
- Remebella Elementary School
- San Isidro Elementary School
- San Isidro Primary School - Extension
- Sta. Maria Primary School
- Villa Leonora Elementary School

=== Secondary schools ===
- Licerio Antiporda Sr. National High School
- Licerio Antiporda Sr. National High School - Sta. Isabel Ext.
- Licerio Antiporda Sr. National High School - Dalaya Annex
- Pattao National High School
- Pattao National High School - Maddalero Ext.
- Northeastern Academy of Buguey
