= Tuao =

Municipality in Cagayan, Philippines

- Municipality
- Municipality of Tuao
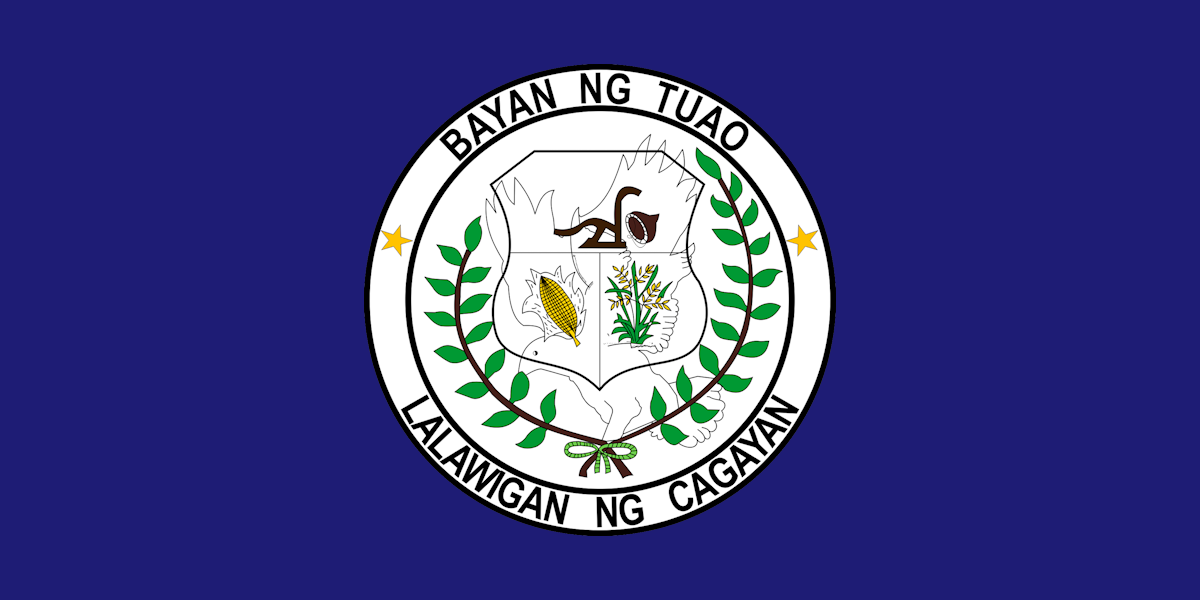
- Flag Seal

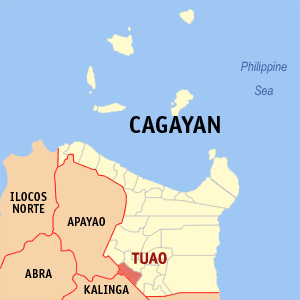
- Map of Cagayan with Tuao highlighted
- Interactive map of Tuao
- Location within the Philippines
- Coordinates: 17°44′06″N 121°27′19″E
- Country: Philippines
- Region: Cagayan Valley
- Province: Cagayan
- District: 3rd district
- Founded: 1851
- Barangays: 32 (see Barangays)

Government
  - Type: Sangguniang Bayan
  - Mayor: William N. Mamba
  - Vice Mayor: Atty. Francisco N. Mamba Jr.
  - Representative: Joseph L. Lara
  - Municipal Council: Members: Leonard M. Beltran; Guillermo A. Sumigad Jr.; Mayonito R. Fernandez; Martin M. Soriano; Jose Pocholo C. Baligod; Nicanor A. Turingan Jr.; Arthur G. Taguiam; Nestor Yap
  - Electorate: 39,161 voters (2025)

Area
  - Total: 215.50 km^{2} (83.21 sq mi)
- Elevation: 67 m (220 ft)
- Highest elevation: 347 m (1,138 ft)
- Lowest elevation: 22 m (72 ft)

Population (2024 census)
  - Total: 66,147
  - Density: 306.95/km^{2} (794.99/sq mi)
  - Households: 14,785

Economy
  - Income class: 1st municipal income class
  - Poverty incidence: 8.84% (2023)
  - Revenue: ₱ 300.9 million (2024)
  - Assets: ₱ 863 million (2024)
  - Expenditure: ₱ 277.8 million (2024)
  - Liabilities: ₱ 120.5 million (2024)

Service provider
  - Electricity: Cagayan 1 Electric Cooperative (CAGELCO 1)
- Time zone: UTC+8 (PST)
- ZIP code: 3528
- PSGC: 0201528000
- IDD : area code: +63 (0)78
- Native languages: Ibanag; Ilocano; Itawis; Tagalog

Tuao, officially the Municipality of Tuao (Ibanag: Ili nat Tuao; Ilocano: Ili ti Tuao; Tagalog: Bayan ng Tuao), is a municipality in the province of Cagayan, Philippines. According to the 2024 census, it has a population of 66,147 people.

== Etymology ==
When the early Spanish missionaries were busy laying the foundation of a church late in the 16th century at a site about six kilometers from the present town of Tuao, a big bird came circling over them and then alighted on the wooden cross erected to mark the place where the cornerstone was laid. It flapped its wings noisily, onomatopoetically sounding like "battuao, battuao, battuao" and then flew away.

== History ==
When the civil authorities founded the town in 1604, the natives insisted that it be called Tuao. Eight years later on May 13, 1612, Tuao was accepted ecclesiastically. Father Miguel de San Jacinto, O.P. gave the town Santos Angeles Custudios (Holy Guardian Angels) as its patron saints.

The early missionaries in Tuao were zealous evangelists and tactful pacifiers of warlike natives. One of them was Father Francisco Capillas, who later became the first martyr in China. The first parish priest, Father Juan B. Cano, O.P. worked patiently with the people. Another missionary, Father Gabriel Serrano, O.P. built a strong brick and mortar church, a rectory (convento) and a fort (cotta) in which the Spaniards and the natives sought refuge every time the town was raided by the Kalingas from the Cordillera ranges. These landmarks were destroyed by a strong earthquake on December 29, 1949.

In protest of abuses committed by Spanish civil officials and soldiers, the inhabitants of Tuao and neighboring Malaueg, rose in revolt in 1718 under Luis Magtangaga and Tomas Sinaguinga. The uprising was put down by Captain Juan Pablo de Orduna.

During World War II, Tuao was the seat of the provincial resistance government of Governor Marcelo Adduru until it was captured by the Japanese in 1943, resulting in Adduru's capture. The Japanese garrisoned the town, but Adduru returned shortly after having been freed by the guerillas early in 1944. Donald Blackburn, "assisted by his intelligence officer Lt. Mariano D. Manawis, from the prominent Daquial family who served in the 11th Infantry;"; staged from Tuao, his guerrilla headquarters, attacks against the Japanese in Tuguegarao.

== Geography ==
Tuao is situated 42.35 kilometres (26.32 mi) from the provincial capital Tuguegarao, and 510.24 kilometres (317.05 mi) from the country's capital city of Manila.

=== Barangays ===
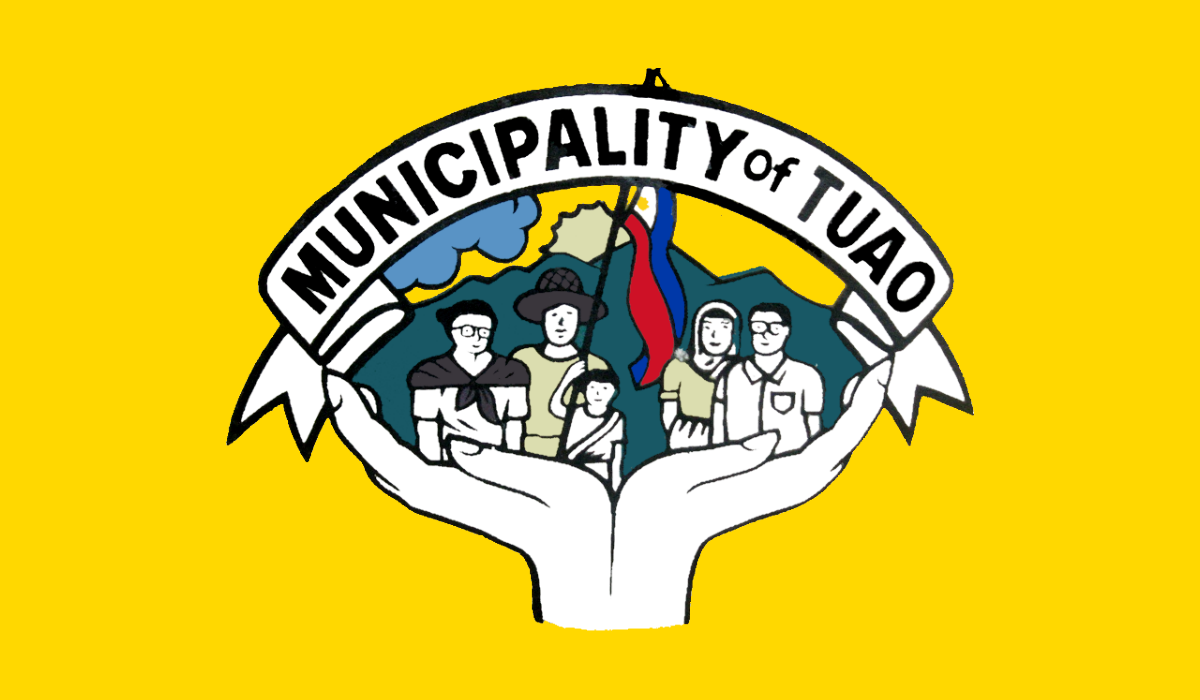
Former flag of Tuao

Tuao is politically subdivided into 32 barangays. Each barangay consists of puroks while some have sitios.

- Accusilian
- Alabiao
- Alabug
- Angang
- Bagumbayan
- Barancuag
- Battung
- Bicok
- Bugnay
- Bulagao
- Cagumitan
- Cato
- Centro 1
- Centro 2
- Culong
- Dagupan
- Fugu
- Lakambini
- Lallayug
- Malalinta
- Malummin
- Mambacag
- Mungo
- Naruangan
- Palca
- Pata
- San Juan
- San Luis (Gurengad)
- San Vicente
- Santo Tomas
- Taribubu
- Villa Laida

=== Climate ===
Climate data for Tuao, Cagayan
Month	Jan	Feb	Mar	Apr	May	Jun	Jul	Aug	Sep	Oct	Nov	Dec	Year
Mean daily maximum °C (°F)	26 (79)	27 (81)	30 (86)	32 (90)	32 (90)	32 (90)	31 (88)	31 (88)	30 (86)	29 (84)	28 (82)	26 (79)	30 (85)
Mean daily minimum °C (°F)	21 (70)	21 (70)	22 (72)	23 (73)	25 (77)	25 (77)	25 (77)	25 (77)	24 (75)	24 (75)	23 (73)	22 (72)	23 (74)
Average precipitation mm (inches)	109 (4.3)	78 (3.1)	64 (2.5)	54 (2.1)	181 (7.1)	196 (7.7)	204 (8.0)	211 (8.3)	174 (6.9)	198 (7.8)	185 (7.3)	231 (9.1)	1,885 (74.2)
Average rainy days	17.2	13.7	13.2	13.0	21.7	23.4	25.2	25.2	21.9	17.7	18.6	20.8	231.6
Source: Meteoblue

== Demographics ==
Population census of Tuao

Year	Pop.	±% p.a.
1903	7,214	—
1918	9,800	+2.06%
1939	14,228	+1.79%
1948	16,365	+1.57%
1960	23,257	+2.97%
1970	28,757	+2.14%
1975	31,597	+1.91%
1980	36,255	+2.79%

Year	Pop.	±% p.a.
1990	43,926	+1.94%
1995	49,285	+2.18%
2000	53,536	+1.79%
2007	57,154	+0.91%
2010	57,620	+0.30%
2015	61,535	+1.26%
2020	63,970	+0.82%
2024	66,147	+0.81%

Source: Philippine Statistics Authority

In the 2024 census, the population of Tuao was 66,147 people, with a density of 310 inhabitants per square kilometre or 800 inhabitants per square mile.

== Economy ==
Poverty incidence of Tuao (%)

Source: Philippine Statistics Authority

== Government ==
=== Local government ===
Tuao is part of the third legislative district of the province of Cagayan. It is governed by a mayor, designated as its local chief executive, and by a municipal council as its legislative body in accordance with the Local Government Code. The mayor, vice mayor, and the municipal councilors are elected directly by the people through an election held every three years.

=== Elected officials ===
Members of the Municipal Council (2019–2022)
Position	Name
Congressman	Joseph L. Lara
Mayor	Francisco N. Mamba Jr.
Vice-Mayor	William N. Mamba
Councilors	Leonard M. Beltran
Councilors	Guillermo A. Sumigad Jr.
Councilors	Mayonito R. Fernandez
Councilors	Martin M. Soriano
Councilors	Jose Pocholo C. Baligod
Councilors	Nicanor A. Turingan Jr.
Councilors	Arthur G. Taguiam
Councilors	Nester Yap

== Education ==
The Schools Division of Cagayan governs the town's public education system. The division office is a field office of the DepEd in Cagayan Valley region. There are two schools district offices which govern al the public and private elementary and high schools throughout the municipality. These are Tuao East District, and Tuao West District.

=== Primary and elementary schools ===
- Accusilian Elementary School
- Alabiao Elementary School
- Alabug Primary School
- Angang Elementary School
- Bagumbayan Elementary School
- Barancuag Elementary School
- Battung Elementary School
- Bicok Elementary School
- Bugnay Elementary School
- Bulagao Elementary School
- Cagumitan Elementary School
- Cato Primary School
- Culung Elementary School
- Dagupan Elementary School
- Lakambini Elementary School
- Fugu-Alabug Elementary School
- Lallayug Elementary School
- Malalinta Elementary School
- Malummin Elementary School
- Mambacag Elementary School
- Mungo Elementary School
- Naruangan Central School
- Palca Elementary School
- Pata Elementary School
- San Juan Elementary School
- San Luis Elementary School
- San Vicente Elementary School
- Sto. Tomas Elementary School
- Taribubu Elementary School
- Tuao Central Elementary School
- Tuao Great Shepherd Academy
- Villa Laida Elementary School

=== Secondary schools ===
- Itawes National High School
- Lyceum of Tuao
- Sto. Angel dela Guardia Academy

=== Technical and vocational schools ===
- Itawes National Agricultural and Technical School
- Itawes National Agricultural and Technical School - Bagumbayan Annex
- Tuao Vocational and Technical School
- Tuao Vocational and Technical School - Culung Annex
- Tuao Vocational and Technical School - Malummin Annex
- Tuao Vocational and Technical School - Pata Annex
