= Alcala, Cagayan =

Municipality in Cagayan, Philippines

Alcala
- Municipality
- Municipality of Alcala
- Seal

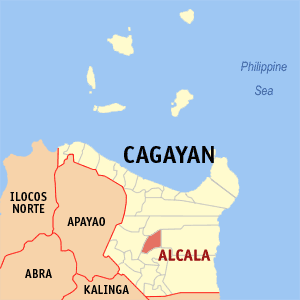
- Map of Cagayan with Alcala highlighted
- Interactive map of Alcala
- Location within the Philippines
- Coordinates: 17°54′11″N 121°39′20″E
- Country: Philippines
- Region: Cagayan Valley
- Province: Cagayan
- District: 1st district
- Barangays: 25 (see Barangays)

Government
  - Type: Sangguniang Bayan
  - Mayor: Cristina I. Antonio
  - Vice Mayor: Joy C. Duruin
  - Representative: Ramon C. Nolasco Jr.
  - Electorate: 24,362 voters (2025)

Area
  - Total: 187.20 km^{2} (72.28 sq mi)
- Elevation: 36 m (118 ft)
- Highest elevation: 219 m (719 ft)
- Lowest elevation: 5 m (16 ft)

Population (2024 census)
  - Total: 41,468
  - Density: 221.52/km^{2} (573.73/sq mi)
  - Households: 9,993

Economy
  - Income class: 1st municipal income class
  - Poverty incidence: 9.92% (2023)
  - Revenue: ₱ 224.7 million (2024)
  - Assets: ₱ 574.9 million (2024)
  - Expenditure: ₱ 201 million (2024)
  - Liabilities: ₱ 45.47 million (2024)

Service provider
  - Electricity: Cagayan 1 Electric Cooperative (CAGELCO 1)
- Time zone: UTC+8 (PST)
- ZIP code: 3507
- PSGC: 0201502000
- IDD : area code: +63 (0)78
- Native languages: Ibanag; Ilocano; Tagalog

Alcala, officially the Municipality of Alcala, is a municipality in the province of Cagayan, Philippines. According to the 2024 census, it has a population of 41,468 people.

It is the birthplace of Senator Melecio Arranz of the 1st Senatorial District of the Philippines. It is also the home of the Saint Philomene Church, regarded as the widest church in the Cagayan Valley.

== History ==
The indigenous tribes of the Ibanag people were the first settlers of modern-day Alcala. They called the area Fulay, literally meaning red, in its reference to the distinct red color of its soil. After two centuries of Spanish rule, Fulay was formally proclaimed as a township on 20 July 1789. However, it was not until 1843 when it was renamed Alcala, in honor of Governor General Francisco Paula de Alcala.

== Geography ==
Alcala is situated 39.01 kilometres (24.24 mi) from the provincial capital Tuguegarao, and 524.16 kilometres (325.70 mi) from the country's capital city of Manila.

=== Barangays ===
Alcala is politically subdivided into 25 barangays. Each barangay consists of puroks while some have sitios.

- Abbeg
- Afusing Bato
- Afusing Daga
- Agani
- Baculod
- Baybayog
- Cabuluan
- Calantac
- Carallangan
- Centro Norte (Poblacion)
- Centro Sur (Poblacion)
- Dalaoig
- Damurog
- Jurisdiction
- Malalatan
- Maraburab
- Masin
- Pagbangkeruan
- Pared
- Piggatan
- Pinopoc
- Pussian
- San Esteban
- Tamban
- Tupang

=== Climate ===
Climate data for Alcala, Cagayan
Month	Jan	Feb	Mar	Apr	May	Jun	Jul	Aug	Sep	Oct	Nov	Dec	Year
Mean daily maximum °C (°F)	24 (75)	25 (77)	28 (82)	30 (86)	31 (88)	31 (88)	30 (86)	30 (86)	29 (84)	28 (82)	26 (79)	24 (75)	28 (82)
Mean daily minimum °C (°F)	20 (68)	20 (68)	21 (70)	22 (72)	24 (75)	24 (75)	24 (75)	24 (75)	24 (75)	23 (73)	23 (73)	21 (70)	23 (72)
Average precipitation mm (inches)	150 (5.9)	106 (4.2)	84 (3.3)	48 (1.9)	103 (4.1)	115 (4.5)	134 (5.3)	156 (6.1)	136 (5.4)	240 (9.4)	246 (9.7)	300 (11.8)	1,818 (71.6)
Average rainy days	19	14.3	12.8	10.8	17.7	18.9	21.5	23.3	22.1	20.4	20.3	22.2	223.3
Source: Meteoblue

== Demographics ==
Population census of Alcala

Year	Pop.	±% p.a.
1903	7,308	—
1918	9,808	+1.98%
1939	12,480	+1.15%
1948	13,214	+0.64%
1960	17,723	+2.48%
1970	21,328	+1.87%
1975	22,568	+1.14%
1980	24,505	+1.66%

Year	Pop.	±% p.a.
1990	29,161	+1.76%
1995	32,035	+1.78%
2000	33,997	+1.28%
2007	35,694	+0.67%
2010	37,773	+2.08%
2015	38,883	+0.55%
2020	41,295	+1.27%
2024	41,468	+0.10%

Source: Philippine Statistics Authority

In the 2024 census, the population of Alcala was 41,468 people, with a density of 220 inhabitants per square kilometre or 570 inhabitants per square mile.

== Economy ==
Poverty incidence of Alcala (%)

Source: Philippine Statistics Authority

Alcala Milk Candy is a famous product of this municipality.

== Government ==
=== Local government ===
Alcala is part of the first legislative district of the province of Cagayan. It is governed by a mayor, designated as its local chief executive, and by a municipal council as its legislative body in accordance with the Local Government Code. The mayor, vice mayor, and the councilors are elected directly by the people through an election which is being held every three years.

=== Elected officials ===
Members of the Municipal Council (2025–2028)
Position	Name
Congressman	Ramon C. Nolasco Jr.
Mayor	Cristina I. Antonio
Vice-Mayor	Denden Sumabat
Councilors	Ener Castillo
Councilors	Basio Vergara
Councilors	Jojo Castillo
Councilors	Seb Manuel
Councilors	Bingbong Mendoza
Councilors	Ilarde Ventula
Councilors	Joy Duruin
Councilors	Elvie Zamora

== Education ==
The Schools Division of Cagayan governs the town's public education system. The division office is a field office of the DepEd in Cagayan Valley region. The Alcala Schools East District Office that govern the public and private elementary and high schools throughout the municipality.

=== Primary and elementary schools ===
- Agani Elementary School
- Alcala East Central School
- Alcala Rural School
- Angkiray Elementary School
- Arana-ar Elementary School
- Baculod Elementary School
- Baybayog Elementary School
- Calantac Elementary School
- Carallangan Elementary School
- Dalaoig Elementary School
- Dalaoig Elementary School - Catarauan Annex
- Damurog Elementary School
- Jurisdiccion Elementary School
- Maraburab Elementary School
- Masin Elementary School
- Piggatan Elementary School
- Pinopoc Elementary School
- Pussian Elementary School
- San Esteban Elementary School
- Tamban Elementary School
- Tupang Elementary School

=== Secondary schools ===
- Baybayog National High School
- Lyceum of Alcala
- St. Philomene of Alcala
- Afusing National Highschool
- Alcala Rural School

== Notable personalities ==
- Alvaro Antonio – politician
- Melecio Arranz – senator
- Filomena Pattung Paat- First Calantac Day Care Worker in Barangay Calantac, Alcala, Cagayan served from 1990 to 2010
