= Camalaniugan =

Municipality in Cagayan, Philippines

- Municipality
- Municipality of Camalaniugan
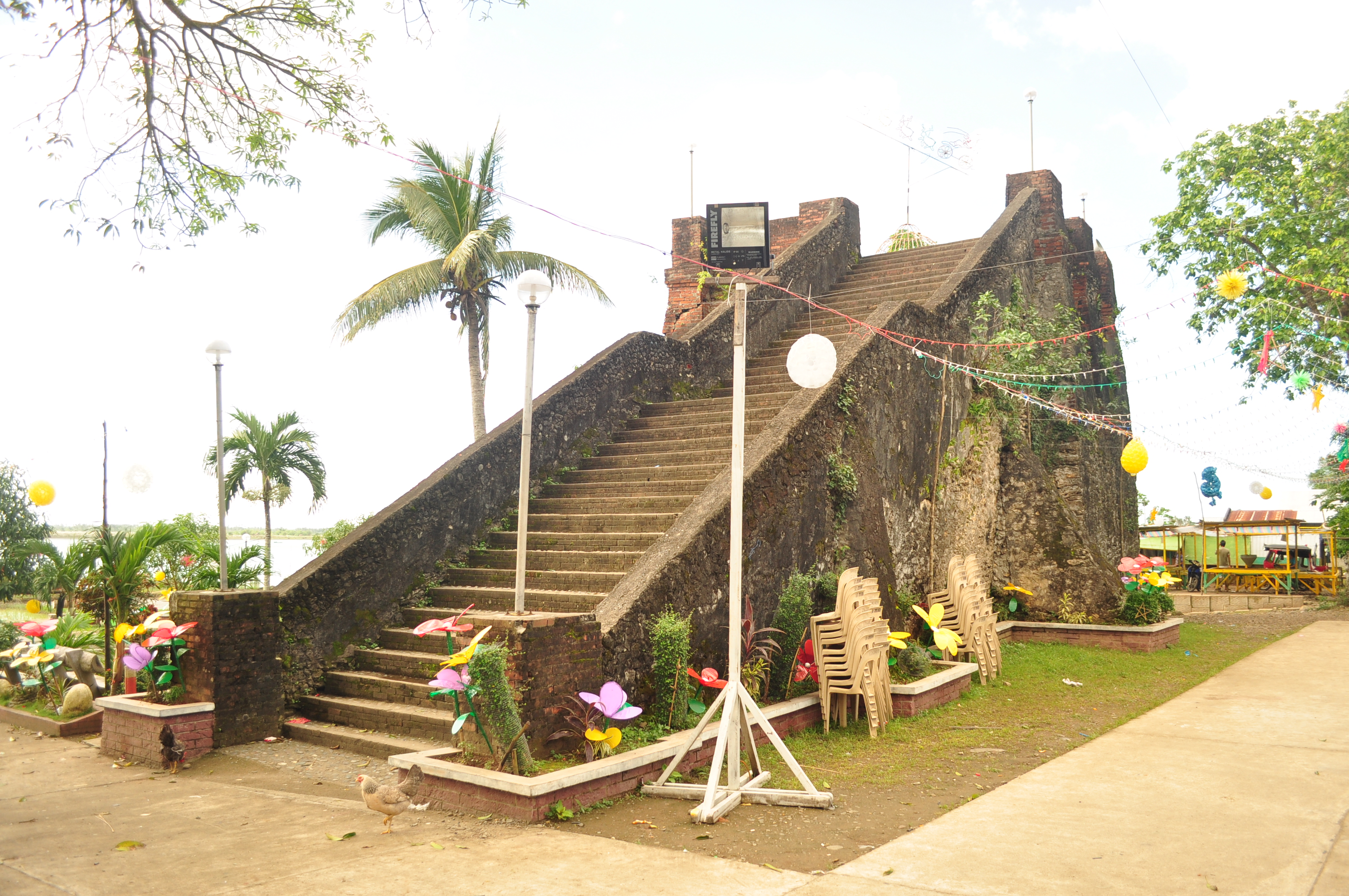
- Spanish horno in Camalaniugan

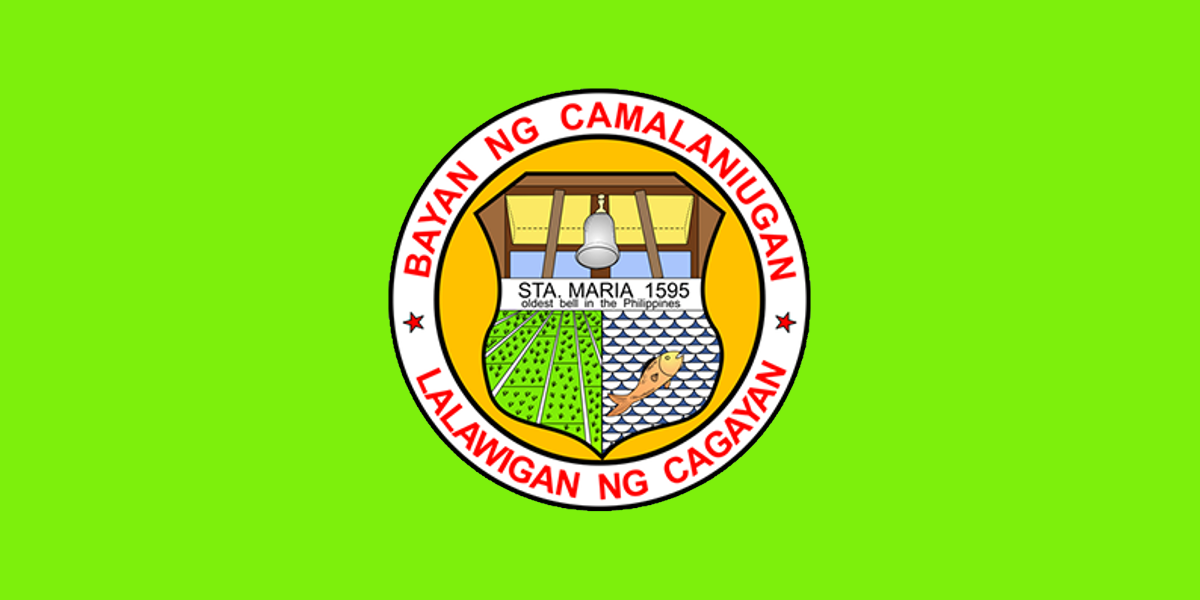
- Flag Seal

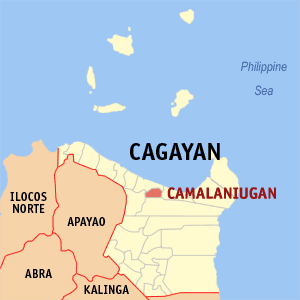
- Map of Cagayan with Camalaniugan highlighted
- Interactive map of Camalaniugan
- Location within the Philippines
- Coordinates: 18°16′32″N 121°40′32″E
- Country: Philippines
- Region: Cagayan Valley
- Province: Cagayan
- District: 1st district
- Founded: June 15, 1596
- Barangays: 28 (see Barangays)

Government
  - Type: Sangguniang Bayan
  - Mayor: Angelica C. dela Cruz
  - Vice Mayor: Isidro T. Cabaddu
  - Representative: Ramon C. Nolasco Jr.
  - Electorate: 16,758 voters (2025)

Area
  - Total: 76.50 km^{2} (29.54 sq mi)
- Elevation: 8.0 m (26.2 ft)
- Highest elevation: 124 m (407 ft)
- Lowest elevation: −2 m (−6.6 ft)

Population (2024 census)
  - Total: 25,629
  - Density: 335.0/km^{2} (867.7/sq mi)
  - Households: 6,112

Economy
  - Income class: 3rd municipal income class
  - Poverty incidence: 8.51% (2023)
  - Revenue: ₱ 159.4 million (2024)
  - Assets: ₱ 487.5 million (2024)
  - Expenditure: ₱ 147.6 million (2024)
  - Liabilities: ₱ 91.07 million (2024)

Service provider
  - Electricity: Cagayan 2 Electric Cooperative (CAGELCO 2)
- Time zone: UTC+8 (PST)
- ZIP code: 3510
- PSGC: 0201510000
- IDD : area code: +63 (0)78
- Native languages: Ilocano; Ibanag; Tagalog

Camalaniugan, officially the Municipality of Camalaniugan (Ibanag: Ili nat Camalaniugan; Ilocano: Ili ti Camalaniugan; Tagalog: Bayan ng Camalaniugan), is a municipality in the province of Cagayan, Philippines. According to the 2024 census, it has a population of 25,629 people.

This town is home to the oldest Christian bell in the Far East and is also the birthplace of Don Vicente Nepomuceno, the esteemed author of "Historia Nac Cagayan", a historical book written in the Ibanag language.

== Etymology ==
The town was named after the "malaniug" (Caryota rumphiana) trees which grew in abundance during the early years. In Fr. Jose Bugarin's Ibanag dictionary "malaniug, a wild palm...Camalaniugan, place where there are many of these [also] a town in this province."

== History ==
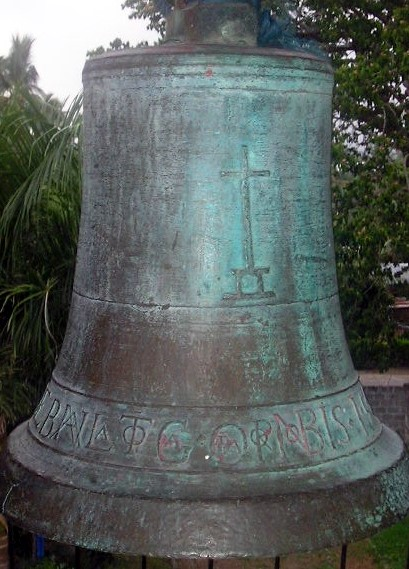
The Santa Maria bell, forged in 1595

Camalaniugan was founded on June 15, 1596, a rather early date because of its proximity to Nueva Segovia (Lallo). San Jacinto de Polonia was selected as their patron saint. The early settlers were the Ibanags and Ilocanos, both peace-loving citizens. They built their houses along the banks of the Cagayan River. They brought with them their knowledge of farming and skills in making weapons. According to the story related by the elders, among these "happy" settlers was Guiab, a famous strongman and leader of Camalaniugan. He did not like the missionaries. Because of this, he was arrested and later hanged from a malaniug tree by order of Juan Pablo Carreon. For years the people suffered injustice.

Between 1887 and 1888, Fray Marcelino Cascos, O.P., built a convent. It was in this convent where Col. Daniel Tirona billeted his men after arresting the missionaries when he occupied the town in 1898 after landing his vessel, the Compania de Filipinas.

The town has a church dedicated to San Jacinto or Saint Hyacinth which houses the oldest church bell (Sancta Maria, 1595) in the far east.

== Geography ==
Camalaniugan is situated 94.16 kilometres (58.51 mi) from the provincial capital Tuguegarao, and 579.31 kilometres (359.97 mi) from the country's capital city of Manila.

=== Barangays ===
Camalaniugan is politically subdivided into 28 barangays. Each barangay consists of puroks while some have sitios.

- Abagao
- Afunan Cabayu
- Agusi
- Alilinu
- Baggao
- Bantay
- Batalla
- Bulala
- Casili Norte
- Casili Sur
- Catotoran Norte
- Catotoran Sur
- Centro Norte (Poblacion)
- Centro Sur (Poblacion)
- Cullit
- Dacal-Lafugu
- Dammang Norte
- Dammang Sur (Felipe Tuzon)
- Dugo
- Fusina
- Jurisdiction
- Luec
- Minanga
- Paragat
- Sapping
- Tagum
- Tuluttuging
- Ziminila

=== Climate ===
Climate data for Camalaniugan, Cagayan
Month	Jan	Feb	Mar	Apr	May	Jun	Jul	Aug	Sep	Oct	Nov	Dec	Year
Mean daily maximum °C (°F)	25 (77)	26 (79)	29 (84)	31 (88)	31 (88)	31 (88)	30 (86)	30 (86)	30 (86)	28 (82)	27 (81)	25 (77)	29 (84)
Mean daily minimum °C (°F)	20 (68)	20 (68)	21 (70)	23 (73)	24 (75)	25 (77)	25 (77)	25 (77)	24 (75)	23 (73)	23 (73)	21 (70)	23 (73)
Average precipitation mm (inches)	120 (4.7)	77 (3.0)	62 (2.4)	40 (1.6)	118 (4.6)	138 (5.4)	162 (6.4)	173 (6.8)	143 (5.6)	198 (7.8)	185 (7.3)	248 (9.8)	1,664 (65.4)
Average rainy days	16.9	12.2	11.5	10.6	18.7	20.1	21.2	23.3	20.8	16.9	16.5	20.0	208.7
Source: Meteoblue (Use with caution: this is modeled/calculated data, not measured locally.)

== Demographics ==
Population census of Camalaniugan

Year	Pop.	±% p.a.
1903	6,216	—
1918	7,655	+1.40%
1939	9,436	+1.00%
1948	7,708	−2.22%
1960	11,456	+3.36%
1970	13,268	+1.48%
1975	13,878	+0.91%
1980	15,078	+1.67%

Year	Pop.	±% p.a.
1990	17,276	+1.37%
1995	19,915	+2.70%
2000	21,186	+1.34%
2007	22,489	+0.83%
2010	23,404	+1.46%
2015	24,923	+1.20%
2020	25,236	+0.26%
2024	25,629	+0.37%

Source: Philippine Statistics Authority

In the 2024 census, the population of Camalaniugan was 25,629 people, with a density of 340 inhabitants per square kilometre or 880 inhabitants per square mile.

== Economy ==
Poverty incidence of Camalaniugan (%)

Source: Philippine Statistics Authority

== Government ==
=== Local government ===
Camalaniugan is part of the first legislative district of the province of Cagayan. It is governed by a mayor, designated as its local chief executive, and by a municipal council as its legislative body in accordance with the Local Government Code. The mayor, vice mayor, and the councilors are elected directly by the people through an election which is being held every three years.

=== Elected officials ===
Members of the Municipal Council (2019–2022)
Position	Name
Congressman	Ramon C. Nolasco Jr.
Mayor	Angelica C. Dela Cruz
Vice-Mayor	Isidro T. Cabaddu
Councilors	Milagros C. Libatique
Councilors	Helie C. Cervano
Councilors	Dante B. Canillo
Councilors	Edna M. Fillon
Councilors	Jamie C. Rosario
Councilors	Manuel U. Barsatan
Councilors	Marlon I. Tenorio
Councilors	Leslie G. Casauay

== Education ==
The Schools Division of Cagayan governs the town's public education system. The division office is a field office of the DepEd in Cagayan Valley region. The Camalaniugan Schools District Office governs the public and private elementary and high schools throughout the municipality.

=== Primary and elementary schools ===
- Alilinu Elementary Schools
- Asbury UMC Learning Center
- Bulala-Fugu Elementary School
- Camalaniugan Central School
- Casili Elementary School
- Catotoran Elementary School
- Dugo Elementary School
- Fusina Elementary School
- Joaquin Dela Cruz Elementary School
- Minanga Elementary School
- Our Lady of Fatima Integrated School of Dugo
- Ziminila Elementary School

=== Secondary schools ===
- Camalaniugan National High School
- Camalaniugan National High School - Catotoran Annex
- Felipe Tuzon Agricultural School
- Lyceum of Camalaniugan
