= Iguig =

Municipality in Cagayan, Philippines

- Municipality
- Municipality of Iguig
- St. James the Apostle Parish in Calvary Hills

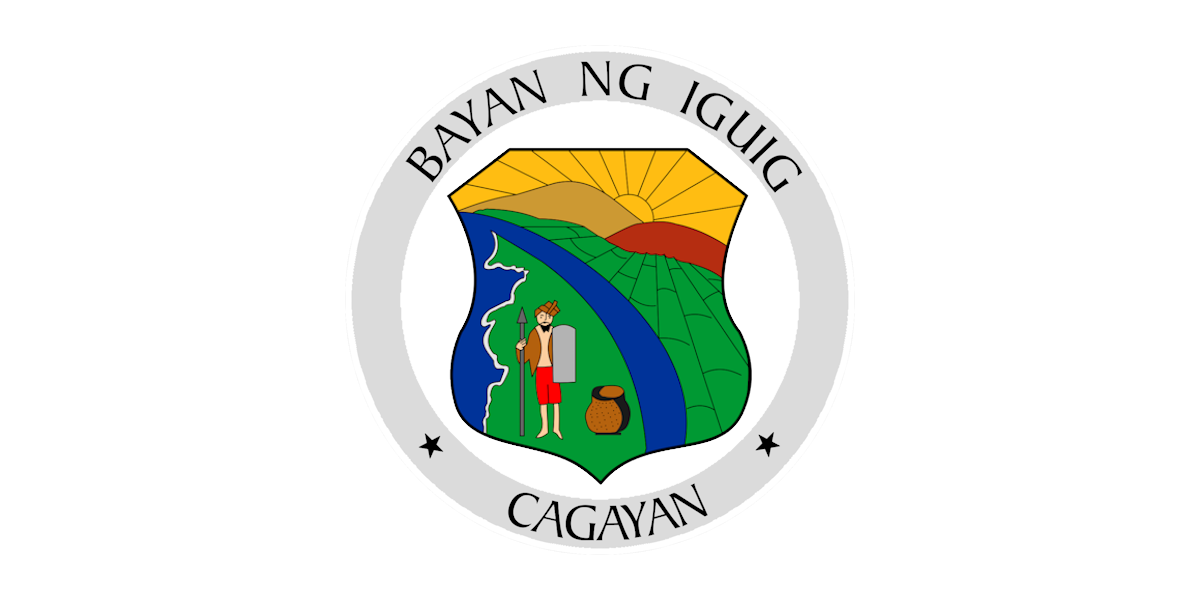
- Flag Seal
- Nickname: Pottery Center of Cagayan
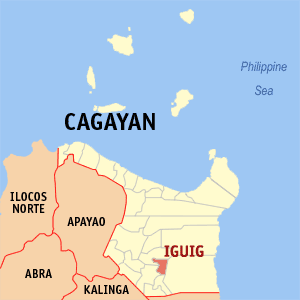
- Map of Cagayan with Iguig highlighted
- Interactive map of Iguig
- Location within the Philippines
- Coordinates: 17°45′06″N 121°44′11″E
- Country: Philippines
- Region: Cagayan Valley
- Province: Cagayan
- District: 3rd district
- Founded: December 28, 1607
- Barangays: 23 (see Barangays)

Government
  - Type: Sangguniang Bayan
  - Mayor: Ferdinand B. Trinidad
  - Vice Mayor: Juditas L. Trinidad
  - Representative: Joseph L. Lara
  - Electorate: 18,868 voters (2025)

Area
  - Total: 108.10 km^{2} (41.74 sq mi)
- Elevation: 34 m (112 ft)
- Highest elevation: 143 m (469 ft)
- Lowest elevation: 8 m (26 ft)

Population (2024 census)
  - Total: 31,342
  - Density: 289.94/km^{2} (750.93/sq mi)
  - Households: 7,015

Economy
  - Income class: 2nd municipal income class
  - Poverty incidence: 9.16% (2023)
  - Revenue: ₱ 178.2 million (2024)
  - Assets: ₱ 658.3 million (2024)
  - Expenditure: ₱ 172.3 million (2024)
  - Liabilities: ₱ 218.6 million (2024)

Service provider
  - Electricity: Cagayan 1 Electric Cooperative (CAGELCO 1)
- Time zone: UTC+8 (PST)
- ZIP code: 3504
- PSGC: 0201515000
- IDD : area code: +63 (0)78
- Native languages: Ibanag; Ilocano; Tagalog
- Website: www.iguig-cagayan.gov.ph

Iguig, officially the Municipality of Iguig (Ibanag: Ili nat Iguig; Ilocano: Ili ti Iguig; Tagalog: Bayan ng Iguig), is a municipality in the province of Cagayan, Philippines. According to the 2024 census, it has a population of 31,342 people.

== History ==
Iguig was officially established as a Spanish mission on 16 April 1608. The name of the town is said to mean "the place of Ig", referring to a native chieftain and warrior who lived in the area.

== Geography ==
Cagayan River at Iguig

Iguig is 14 kilometres (8.7 mi) from Tuguegarao and 495 kilometres (308 mi) from Manila.

=== Barangays ===
Iguig is politically subdivided into 23 barangays. Each barangay consists of puroks while some have sitios.

- Ajat (Poblacion)
- Atulu
- Baculud
- Bayo
- Campo
- Dumpao
- Gammad
- Garab
- Malabbac
- Manaoag (Aquiliquilao)
- Minanga Norte
- Minanga Sur
- Nattanzan (Poblacion)
- Redondo
- Salamague
- San Esteban (Capitan)
- San Isidro (Ugac West)
- San Lorenzo
- San Vicente (Ugac East)
- Santa Barbara
- Santa Rosa
- Santa Teresa (Gammad Sur)
- Santiago

=== Climate ===
Climate data for Iguig, Cagayan
Month	Jan	Feb	Mar	Apr	May	Jun	Jul	Aug	Sep	Oct	Nov	Dec	Year
Mean daily maximum °C (°F)	25 (77)	26 (79)	28 (82)	31 (88)	32 (90)	31 (88)	31 (88)	30 (86)	30 (86)	28 (82)	27 (81)	25 (77)	29 (84)
Mean daily minimum °C (°F)	21 (70)	21 (70)	22 (72)	23 (73)	24 (75)	25 (77)	24 (75)	25 (77)	24 (75)	23 (73)	23 (73)	22 (72)	23 (74)
Average precipitation mm (inches)	155 (6.1)	113 (4.4)	89 (3.5)	58 (2.3)	127 (5.0)	131 (5.2)	154 (6.1)	184 (7.2)	151 (5.9)	247 (9.7)	221 (8.7)	292 (11.5)	1,922 (75.6)
Average rainy days	19.6	14.8	13.4	12	19.4	19.8	23	25.0	23	19.4	19.1	21.6	230.1
Source: Meteoblue

== Demographics ==
Population census of Iguig

Year	Pop.	±% p.a.
1903	3,800	—
1918	5,413	+2.39%
1939	8,205	+2.00%
1948	8,115	−0.12%
1960	11,263	+2.77%
1970	13,684	+1.96%
1975	14,286	+0.87%
1980	15,760	+1.98%

Year	Pop.	±% p.a.
1990	18,598	+1.67%
1995	19,100	+0.50%
2000	21,858	+2.93%
2007	26,096	+2.47%
2010	25,559	−0.75%
2015	27,862	+1.66%
2020	30,060	+1.61%
2024	31,342	+1.01%

Source: Philippine Statistics Authority

In the 2024 census, the population of Iguig was 31,342 people, with a density of 290 inhabitants per square kilometre or 750 inhabitants per square mile.

== Economy ==
Poverty incidence of Iguig (%)

Source: Philippine Statistics Authority

== Government ==
=== Local government ===
Iguig is part of the third legislative district of the province of Cagayan. It is governed by a mayor, designated as its local chief executive, and by a municipal council as its legislative body in accordance with the Local Government Code. The mayor, vice mayor, and the councilors are elected directly by the people through an election which is being held every three years.

=== Elected officials ===
Members of the Municipal Council (2019–2022)
Position	Name
Congressman	Joseph L. Lara
Mayor	Ferdinand B. Trinidad
Vice-Mayor	Juditas L. Trinidad
Councilors	Ma. Riza Lyn B. Callueng
Councilors	Benjamin Pascual Jr.
Councilors	Juliet P. Barizo
Councilors	Juanito Ramos
Councilors	Mario Pelovello
Councilors	Raul B. Trinidad
Councilors	Marcial Liquigan
Councilors	Ventura D. Zinampan

== Education ==
The Schools Division of Cagayan governs the town's public education system. The division office is a field office of the DepEd in Cagayan Valley region. The Iguig Schools District Office governs all public and private elementary and high schools throughout the municipality.

=== Primary and elementary schools ===
- Baculud Elementary School
- Bayo Elementary School
- Capitan Elementary School
- Dumpao Elementary School
- Gammad Elementary School
- Garab Elementary School
- Iguig Central School
- Malabbac Elementary School
- Manaoag Elementary School
- Minanga Norte Elementary School
- Mother Therese Learning Center
- Redondo Elementary School
- Sta. Barbara Elementary School
- Sta. Teresa Elementary School
- Ugac Elementary School

=== Secondary schools ===
- Caridad B. Trinidad National High School
- Gammad National High School
- Vicente D. Trinidad High School

== Notable people ==
- Dado Banatao: a software engineer credited for having developed the first 10-Mbit Ethernet CMOS with silicon coupler data-link control and transreceiver chip.
