= 2011 Cagayan's 2nd congressional district special election =

Filipino special election

2011 special election at Cagayan's 2nd congressional district
- March 12, 2011

Cagayan's 2nd congressional district Triggered by death of the incumbent
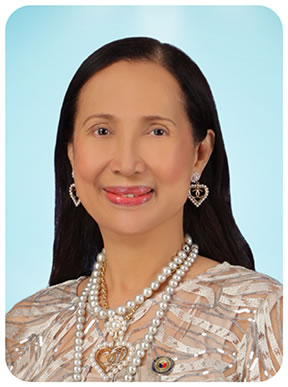

Candidate	Baby Aline Vargas-Alfonso	Edgar Lara
Party	Lakas–Kampi	Liberal
Popular vote	69,461	26,582
Percentage	73.62	27.68
Representative before election
Florencio Vargas
Lakas–Kampi
Representative-elect
Baby Aline Vargas-Alfonso
Lakas–Kampi

A special election for Cagayan's 2nd district seat in the House of Representatives of the Philippines was held on March 12, 2011, , to fill the district's vacant seat in the House of Representatives of the Philippines for the remainder of the 15th Congress. The special election was called after the incumbent representative, Florencio Vargas died in July 2010. Vargas' daughter, Baby Aline Vargas-Alfonso, was elected after beating former Cagayan Governor Edgar Lara, Vargas' opponent in the 2010 election. Alfonso would then serve the remainder of her father's term which ended in 2013.

== Electoral system ==
The House of Representatives is elected via parallel voting system, with 80% of seats elected from congressional districts, and 20% from the party-list system. Each district sends one representative to the House of Representatives. An election to the seat is via first-past-the-post, in which the candidate with the most votes, whether or not one has a majority, wins the seat.

Based on Republic Act (RA) No. 6645, in order for a special election to take place, the seat must be vacated, the relevant chamber notifies the Commission on Elections (COMELEC) the existence of a vacancy, then the COMELEC schedules the special election. There is a dispute in the procedure as a subsequent law, RA No. 7166, supposedly amended the procedure, bypassing the need for official communication from the relevant chamber of the vacancy. The COMELEC has always waited on official communication from the relevant chamber before scheduling a special election.

Meanwhile, according to Republic Act No. 8295, should only one candidate file to run in the special election, the COMELEC will declare that candidate as the winner and will no longer hold the election.

== Background ==
Cagayan's 2nd congressional district consists of the western Cagayan municipalities of Abulug, Allacapan, Ballesteros, Calayan, Claveria, Lasam, Pamplona, Piat, Rizal, Sanchez-Mira, Santa Praxedes and Santo Niño since its second re-establishment in 1987.

Incumbent representative Florencio Vargas of Lakas-Kampi-CMD won the general election on May 10, 2010. His term began on June 30, but he died on July 22, a few days before the 15th Congress convened. The two other congressmen from Cagayan, Jack Enrile and Randolph Ting, then filed a resolution declaring Vargas' seat vacant paving way for a special election. Defeated candidate and former governor Edgar Lara had previously expressed interest in participating if a special election was called, and also said that he expects any member of the Vargas family to run as well. On December 13, Enrile was designated by Speaker Feliciano Belmonte Jr. as the caretaker of the 2nd district pending the approval of a special election.

The Commission on Elections has set the election on March 12, 2011. The period for the filing of certificates of candidacy will be from February 21 to 25, and the campaign period will be from February 26 to March 10. Unlike the general election, the special election was conducted manually.

== Candidates ==
Only two candidates ran. Lara, formerly of the Nationalist People's Coalition, was the ruling Liberal Party's nominee for the special election, while Vargas' daughter, Abulug vice mayor Baby Aline Vargas-Alfonso, was his opponent.

1. Edgar Lara (Liberal), former governor of Cagayan
2. Baby Aline Vargas-Alfonso (Lakas–Kampi), vice mayor of Abulug

== Campaign ==
President Benigno Aquino III and the ruling Liberal Party supported Lara's candidacy, while Cagayan governor Alvaro Antonio and 1st district representative Jack Enrile's Team Cagayan coalition supported Alfonso, the daughter of the late representative. Alfonso is running under the Lakas Kampi CMD banner.

== Results ==
2011 Cagayan's 2nd congressional district special election
Candidate	Party	Votes	%
Baby Aline Vargas-Alfonso	Lakas–Kampi–CMD	69,461	72.32
Edgar Lara	Liberal Party	26,582	27.68
Total		96,043	100.00
Majority		42,879	44.65
Lakas Kampi CMD hold			

Alfonso was declared the winner after the Commission on Elections finished canvassing in ten of the twelve municipalities in the district. The low turnout was blamed on residents residing outside the district not returning to their homes during the weekend, and the aftermath of the 2011 Tōhoku earthquake and tsunami in which voters were discouraged from casting their votes when residents from the coastal towns of the district evacuated due to a tsunami alert and only returned morning of election day.

Alfonso was sworn in as a member of the House of Representatives on March 16, raising its membership to 284, the largest in its history.

== 2010 election result ==
2010 Philippine House of Representatives election at 2011 Cagayan's 2nd district
Candidate	Party	Votes	%
Florencio Vargas	Lakas–Kampi–CMD	85,376	73.21
Edgar Lara	Nationalist People's Coalition	28,303	24.27
Lydia Ramos	Aksyon Demokratiko	2,938	2.52
Total		116,617	100.00
Valid votes		116,617	93.10
Invalid/blank votes		8,646	6.90
Total votes		125,263	100.00
Majority		57,073	48.94
Lakas–Kampi–CMD hold			
