= Cagayan's 2nd congressional district =

Congressional district in the Philippines

- Constituency for the House of Representatives of the Philippines
- Location of Cagayan within the Philippines
- Province: Cagayan
- Region: Cagayan Valley
- Population: 322,634 (2020)
- Electorate: 209,121 (2022)
- Major settlements: 12 LGUs: Municipalities; Abulug; Allacapan; Ballesteros; Calayan; Claveria; Lasam; Pamplona; Piat; Rizal; Sanchez-Mira; Santa Praxedes; Santo Niño
- Area: 2,751.40 km^{2} (1,062.32 sq mi)

Current constituency
- Created: 1907
- Representative: Baby Aline Vargas-Alfonso
- Political party: PFP
- Congressional bloc: Majority

Cagayan's 2nd congressional district is one of the three congressional districts of the Philippines in the province of Cagayan. It has been represented in the House of Representatives of the Philippines since 1916 and earlier in the Philippine Assembly from 1907 to 1916. The district consists of the western municipalities of Abulug, Allacapan, Ballesteros, Calayan, Claveria, Lasam, Pamplona, Piat, Rizal, Sanchez-Mira, Santa Praxedes and Santo Niño. The municipalities of Enrile and Tuao were part of the district until its second dissolution in 1972. It is currently represented in the 20th Congress by Baby Aline Vargas-Alfonso of the Partido Federal ng Pilipinas (PFP).

== Representation history ==
#	Image	Member	Term of office		Legislature	Party	Electoral history	Constituent LGUs
#	Image	Member	Start	End	Legislature	Party	Electoral history	Constituent LGUs
=== Cagayan's 2nd district for the Philippine Assembly ===
District created January 9, 1907.
1		Gabriel Lasam	October 16, 1907	October 16, 1909	1st	Progresista	Elected in 1907.	1907–1916; Abulug, Claveria, Enrile, Faire, Mauanan, Pamplona, Piat, Sanchez-Mira, Solana, Tuao
2		Leoncio Fonacier	October 16, 1909	October 16, 1912	2nd	Nacionalista	Elected in 1909.	1907–1916; Abulug, Claveria, Enrile, Faire, Mauanan, Pamplona, Piat, Sanchez-Mira, Solana, Tuao
3		Juan Quintos	October 16, 1912	October 16, 1916	3rd	Progresista	Elected in 1912.	1907–1916; Abulug, Claveria, Enrile, Faire, Mauanan, Pamplona, Piat, Sanchez-Mira, Solana, Tuao
=== Cagayan's 2nd district for the House of Representatives of the Philippine Islands ===
4		Miguel Concepción Nava	October 16, 1916	June 3, 1919	4th	Nacionalista	Elected in 1916.	1916–1922; Abulug, Claveria, Enrile, Faire, Pamplona, Piat, Rizal, Sanchez-Mira, Solana, Tuao
5		Bonifacio Cortés	June 3, 1919	June 6, 1922	5th	Nacionalista	Elected in 1919.	1916–1922; Abulug, Claveria, Enrile, Faire, Pamplona, Piat, Rizal, Sanchez-Mira, Solana, Tuao
6		Proceso Sebastian	June 6, 1922	June 2, 1925	6th	Demócrata	Elected in 1922.	1922–1935; Abulug, Ballesteros, Claveria, Enrile, Faire, Pamplona, Piat, Rizal, Sanchez-Mira, Solana, Tuao
7		Antonio Guzmán	June 2, 1925	June 5, 1928	7th	Demócrata	Elected in 1925.	1922–1935; Abulug, Ballesteros, Claveria, Enrile, Faire, Pamplona, Piat, Rizal, Sanchez-Mira, Solana, Tuao
8		Claro Sabbun	June 5, 1928	June 2, 1931	8th	Nacionalista; Consolidado	Elected in 1928.	1922–1935; Abulug, Ballesteros, Claveria, Enrile, Faire, Pamplona, Piat, Rizal, Sanchez-Mira, Solana, Tuao
9		Sabas Casibang	June 2, 1931	June 5, 1934	9th	Nacionalista; Consolidado	Elected in 1931.	1922–1935; Abulug, Ballesteros, Claveria, Enrile, Faire, Pamplona, Piat, Rizal, Sanchez-Mira, Solana, Tuao
10		Cosme Marzán	June 5, 1934	September 16, 1935	10th	Nacionalista; Democrático	Elected in 1934.	1922–1935; Abulug, Ballesteros, Claveria, Enrile, Faire, Pamplona, Piat, Rizal, Sanchez-Mira, Solana, Tuao
#	Image	Member	Term of office		National Assembly	Party	Electoral history	Constituent LGUs
#	Image	Member	Start	End	National Assembly	Party	Electoral history	Constituent LGUs
=== Cagayan's 2nd district for the National Assembly (Commonwealth of the Philippines) ===
11		Regino Veridiano	September 16, 1935	December 30, 1938	1st	Nacionalista; Democrático	Elected in 1935.	1935–1941; Abulug, Allacapan, Ballesteros, Claveria, Enrile, Faire, Langangan, Pamplona, Piat, Rizal, Sanchez-Mira, Solana, Tuao
12		Miguel P. Pío	December 30, 1938	December 30, 1941	2nd	Nacionalista	Elected in 1938.	1935–1941; Abulug, Allacapan, Ballesteros, Claveria, Enrile, Faire, Langangan, Pamplona, Piat, Rizal, Sanchez-Mira, Solana, Tuao
District dissolved into the two-seat Cagayan's at-large district for the National Assembly (Second Philippine Republic).
#	Image	Member	Term of office		Common wealth Congress	Party	Electoral history	Constituent LGUs
#	Image	Member	Start	End	Common wealth Congress	Party	Electoral history	Constituent LGUs
=== Cagayan's 2nd district for the House of Representatives of the Commonwealth of the Philippines ===
District re-created May 24, 1945.
(12)		Miguel P. Pío	June 11, 1945	May 25, 1946	1st	Nacionalista	Re-elected in 1941.	1945–1946; Abulug, Allacapan, Ballesteros, Claveria, Enrile, Faire, Langangan, Pamplona, Piat, Rizal, Sanchez-Mira, Solana, Tuao
#	Image	Member	Term of office		Congress	Party	Electoral history	Constituent LGUs
#	Image	Member	Start	End	Congress	Party	Electoral history	Constituent LGUs
=== Cagayan's 2nd district for the House of Representatives of the Philippines ===
13		Paulino A. Alonzo	May 25, 1946	December 30, 1957	1st	Liberal	Elected in 1946.	1946–1953; Abulug, Allacapan, Ballesteros, Claveria, Enrile, Faire, Langangan, Pamplona, Piat, Rizal, Sanchez-Mira, Solana, Tuao
13		Paulino A. Alonzo	May 25, 1946	December 30, 1957	2nd	Liberal	Re-elected in 1949.	1946–1953; Abulug, Allacapan, Ballesteros, Claveria, Enrile, Faire, Langangan, Pamplona, Piat, Rizal, Sanchez-Mira, Solana, Tuao
13		Paulino A. Alonzo	May 25, 1946	December 30, 1957	3rd	Liberal	Re-elected in 1953.	1953–1965; Abulug, Allacapan, Ballesteros, Claveria, Enrile, Faire, Langangan, Lasam, Pamplona, Piat, Rizal, Sanchez-Mira, Solana, Tuao
14		Benjamin T. Ligot	December 30, 1957	December 30, 1969	4th	Nacionalista	Elected in 1957.	1953–1965; Abulug, Allacapan, Ballesteros, Claveria, Enrile, Faire, Langangan, Lasam, Pamplona, Piat, Rizal, Sanchez-Mira, Solana, Tuao
14		Benjamin T. Ligot	December 30, 1957	December 30, 1969	5th	Nacionalista	Re-elected in 1961.	1953–1965; Abulug, Allacapan, Ballesteros, Claveria, Enrile, Faire, Langangan, Lasam, Pamplona, Piat, Rizal, Sanchez-Mira, Solana, Tuao
14		Benjamin T. Ligot	December 30, 1957	December 30, 1969	6th	Nacionalista	Re-elected in 1965.	1965–1969; Abulug, Allacapan, Ballesteros, Claveria, Enrile, Faire, Lasam, Pamplona, Piat, Rizal, Sanchez-Mira, Santa Praxedes, Solana, Tuao
15		Davíd M. Púzon	December 30, 1969	September 23, 1972	7th	Nacionalista	Elected in 1969. Removed from office after imposition of martial law.	1969–1972; Abulug, Allacapan, Ballesteros, Claveria, Enrile, Lasam, Pamplona, Piat, Rizal, Sanchez-Mira, Santa Praxedes, Santo Niño, Solana, Tuao
District dissolved into the seven-seat Region II's at-large district for the Interim Batasang Pambansa, followed by the three-seat Cagayan's at-large district for the Regular Batasang Pambansa.
District re-created February 2, 1987.
16		Leoncio M. Puzon	June 30, 1987	June 30, 1992	8th	PDP–Laban	Elected in 1987.	1987–present Abulug, Allacapan, Ballesteros, Calayan, Claveria, Lasam, Pamplona, Piat, Rizal, Sanchez-Mira, Santa Praxedes, Santo Niño
17		Edgar R. Lara	June 30, 1992	June 30, 2001	9th	NPC	Elected in 1992.	1987–present Abulug, Allacapan, Ballesteros, Calayan, Claveria, Lasam, Pamplona, Piat, Rizal, Sanchez-Mira, Santa Praxedes, Santo Niño
17		Edgar R. Lara	June 30, 1992	June 30, 2001	10th	NPC	Re-elected in 1995.	1987–present Abulug, Allacapan, Ballesteros, Calayan, Claveria, Lasam, Pamplona, Piat, Rizal, Sanchez-Mira, Santa Praxedes, Santo Niño
17		Edgar R. Lara	June 30, 1992	June 30, 2001	11th	NPC	Re-elected in 1998.	1987–present Abulug, Allacapan, Ballesteros, Calayan, Claveria, Lasam, Pamplona, Piat, Rizal, Sanchez-Mira, Santa Praxedes, Santo Niño
18		Celia C. Taganas-Layus	June 30, 2001	June 30, 2004	12th	NPC	Elected in 2001.	1987–present Abulug, Allacapan, Ballesteros, Calayan, Claveria, Lasam, Pamplona, Piat, Rizal, Sanchez-Mira, Santa Praxedes, Santo Niño
19		Florencio Vargas	June 30, 2004	July 22, 2010	13th	Liberal	Elected in 2004.	1987–present Abulug, Allacapan, Ballesteros, Calayan, Claveria, Lasam, Pamplona, Piat, Rizal, Sanchez-Mira, Santa Praxedes, Santo Niño
19		Florencio Vargas	June 30, 2004	July 22, 2010	14th	Lakas	Re-elected in 2007.	1987–present Abulug, Allacapan, Ballesteros, Calayan, Claveria, Lasam, Pamplona, Piat, Rizal, Sanchez-Mira, Santa Praxedes, Santo Niño
19		Florencio Vargas	June 30, 2004	July 22, 2010	15th	Lakas	Re-elected in 2010. Died.	1987–present Abulug, Allacapan, Ballesteros, Calayan, Claveria, Lasam, Pamplona, Piat, Rizal, Sanchez-Mira, Santa Praxedes, Santo Niño
20		Baby Aline Vargas-Alfonso	March 16, 2011	June 30, 2019	15th	NUP	Elected to finish her father's term.	1987–present Abulug, Allacapan, Ballesteros, Calayan, Claveria, Lasam, Pamplona, Piat, Rizal, Sanchez-Mira, Santa Praxedes, Santo Niño
20		Baby Aline Vargas-Alfonso	March 16, 2011	June 30, 2019	16th	NUP	Re-elected in 2013.	1987–present Abulug, Allacapan, Ballesteros, Calayan, Claveria, Lasam, Pamplona, Piat, Rizal, Sanchez-Mira, Santa Praxedes, Santo Niño
20		Baby Aline Vargas-Alfonso	March 16, 2011	June 30, 2019	17th	NUP	Re-elected in 2016.	1987–present Abulug, Allacapan, Ballesteros, Calayan, Claveria, Lasam, Pamplona, Piat, Rizal, Sanchez-Mira, Santa Praxedes, Santo Niño
21		Samantha Louise V. Alfonso	June 30, 2019	June 30, 2022	18th	NUP	Elected in 2019.	1987–present Abulug, Allacapan, Ballesteros, Calayan, Claveria, Lasam, Pamplona, Piat, Rizal, Sanchez-Mira, Santa Praxedes, Santo Niño
(20)		Baby Aline Vargas-Alfonso	June 30, 2022	Incumbent	19th	Lakas	Elected in 2022.	1987–present Abulug, Allacapan, Ballesteros, Calayan, Claveria, Lasam, Pamplona, Piat, Rizal, Sanchez-Mira, Santa Praxedes, Santo Niño
(20)		Baby Aline Vargas-Alfonso	June 30, 2022	Incumbent	20th	PFP	Re-elected in 2025.	1987–present Abulug, Allacapan, Ballesteros, Calayan, Claveria, Lasam, Pamplona, Piat, Rizal, Sanchez-Mira, Santa Praxedes, Santo Niño

== Election results ==
=== 2025 ===
2025 Philippine House of Representatives elections
Candidate	Party	Votes	%
Baby Alfonso (incumbent)	Lakas–CMD	100,692	58.68
Harry Florida	Nacionalista Party	63,927	37.25
Edgar Lara	Nationalist People's Coalition	6,982	4.07
Total		171,601	100.00
Valid votes		171,601	95.26
Invalid/blank votes		8,532	4.74
Total votes		180,133	100.00
Registered voters/turnout		210,751	85.47
Lakas–CMD hold			
Source: Commission on Elections

=== 2022 ===
2022 Philippine House of Representatives elections
Candidate	Party	Votes	%
Baby Alfonso	Lakas–CMD	123,428	89.63
James Bryan Sacramed	Nacionalista Party	12,515	9.09
Melvin Capili	Partido Federal ng Pilipinas	1,766	1.28
Total		137,709	100.00
Total votes		175,143	–
Registered voters/turnout		209,121	83.75
Lakas–CMD gain from National Unity Party			
Source: Commission on Elections

=== 2016 ===
2016 Philippine House of Representatives elections
Party	Candidate	Votes	%
NUP	Baby Aline Vargas-Alfonso	74,081	
Liberal	Darwin Sacramed	22,256	
Invalid or blank votes		15,895	
Total votes		112,232	
NUP hold			

=== 2013 ===
2013 Philippine House of Representatives elections
Party	Candidate	Votes	%
NUP	Baby Aline Vargas-Alfonso	64,917	66.89
Invalid or blank votes		32,131	33.11
Total votes		97,048	100.00
NUP hold			

=== 2011 special ===
2011 Philippine House of Representatives special election at Cagayan's 2nd district
Party	Candidate	Votes	%	±%
Lakas–Kampi	Baby Aline Vargas-Alfonso	69,461	72.32	−0.89
Liberal	Edgar Lara	26,582	27.68	+3.41
Turnout		96,043	62.09	−18.89
Margin of victory		42,879	44.65	−4.29
Lakas–Kampi hold		Swing	1.26	

=== 2010 ===
2010 Philippine House of Representatives elections
Party	Candidate	Votes	%
Lakas–Kampi	Florencio Vargas	85,376	73.21
NPC	Edgar Lara	28,303	24.27
Aksyon	Lydia Ramos	2,938	2.52
Valid ballots		116,617	93.10
Invalid or blank votes		8,646	6.90
Total votes		125,263	100.00
Lakas–Kampi hold			

== See also ==
- Legislative districts of Cagayan
