= Sanchez Mira =

Municipality in Cagayan, Philippines

Municipality of Sanchez Mira Malolokit
- Municipality
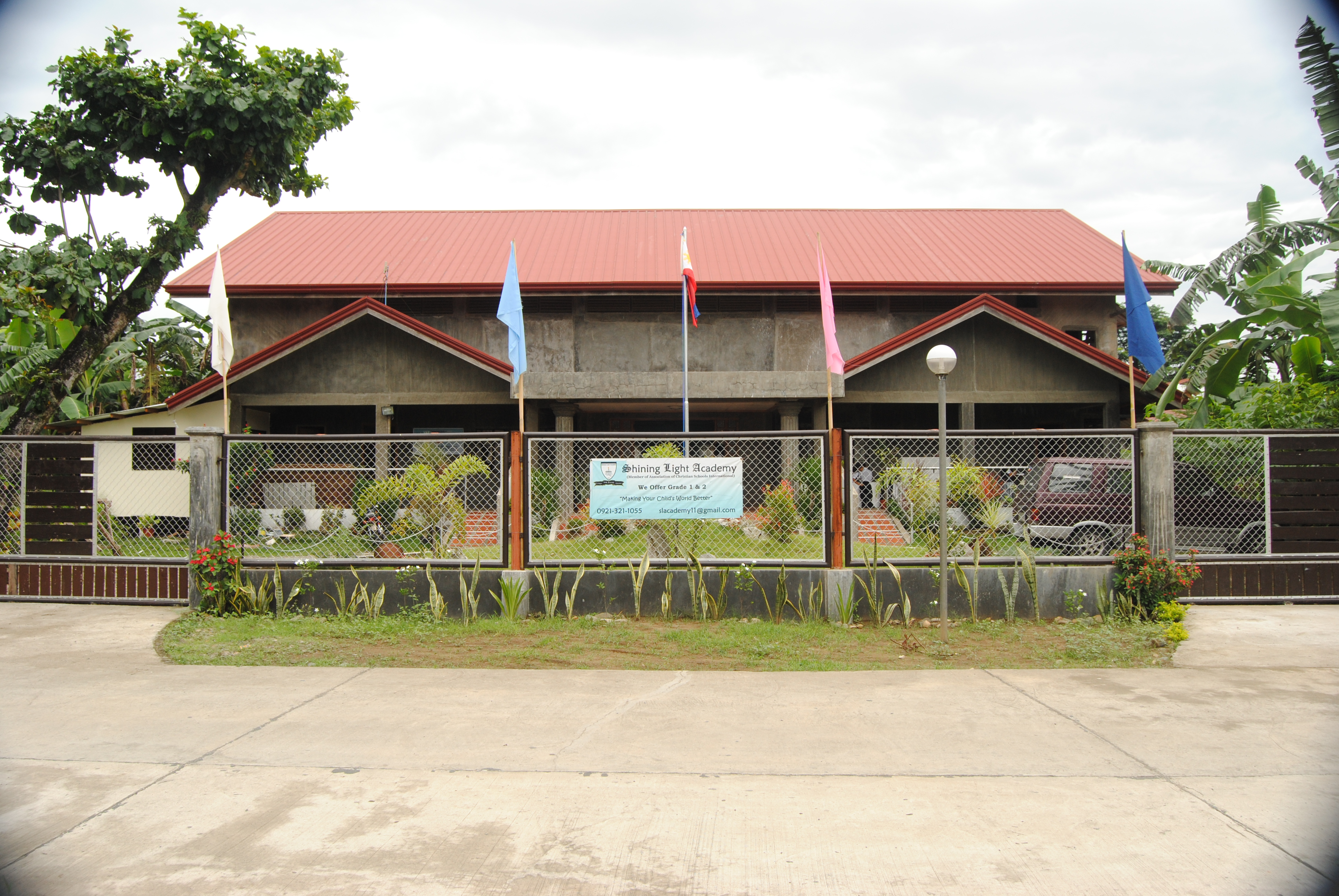
- A private elementary school in Sanchez Mira

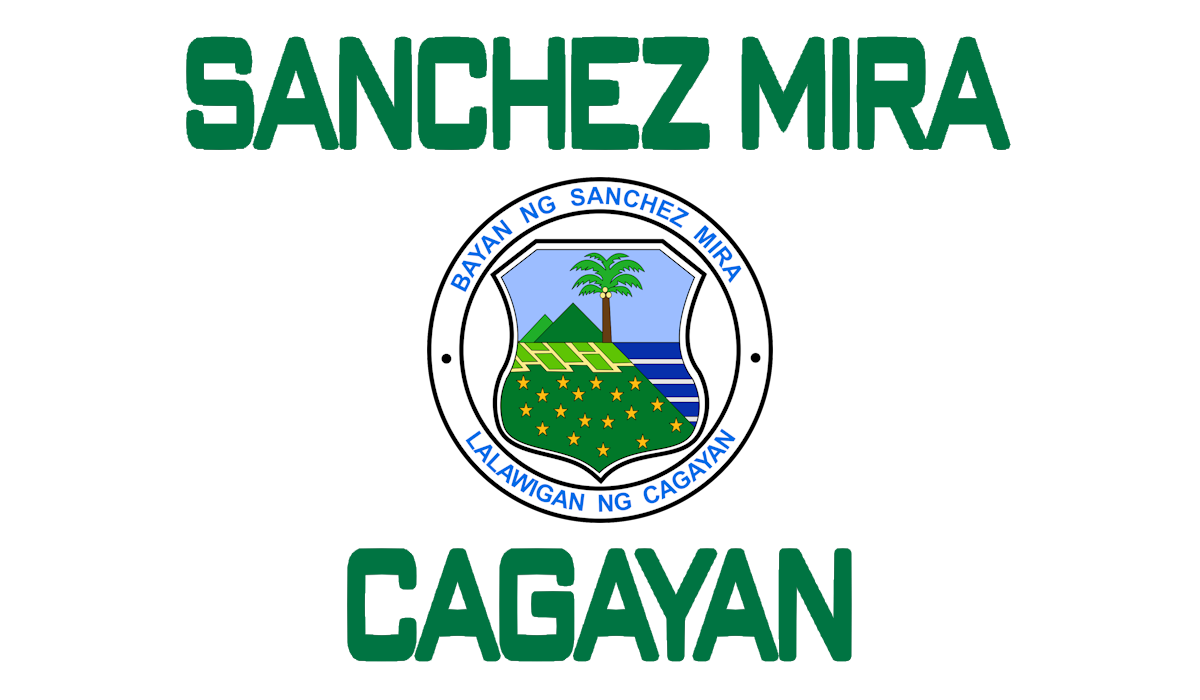
- Flag Seal
- Motto: Dur-as Sanchez Mira!
- Anthem: Sanchez Mira Hymn
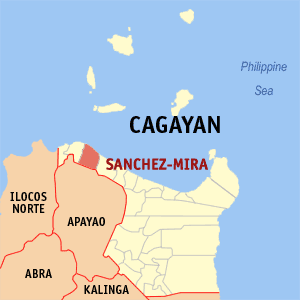
- Map of Cagayan with Sanchez Mira highlighted
- Interactive map of Municipality of Sanchez Mira
- Location within the Philippines
- Coordinates: 18°33′40″N 121°14′04″E
- Country: Philippines
- Region: Cagayan Valley
- Province: Cagayan
- District: 2nd district
- Founded: 1887
- Barangays: 18 (see Barangays)

Government
  - Type: Sangguniang Bayan
  - Mayor: Abraham B. Bagasin
  - Vice Mayor: Asela Bagasin-Sacramed
  - Representative: Baby Aline V. Alfonso
  - Electorate: 17,173 voters (2025)

Area
  - Total: 198.80 km^{2} (76.76 sq mi)
- Elevation: 61 m (200 ft)
- Highest elevation: 1,261 m (4,137 ft)
- Lowest elevation: 0 m (0 ft)

Population (2024 census)
  - Total: 26,292
  - Density: 132.25/km^{2} (342.54/sq mi)
  - Households: 6,645

Economy
  - Income class: 2nd municipal income class
  - Poverty incidence: 5.94% (2023)
  - Revenue: ₱ 185.9 million (2024)
  - Assets: ₱ 688.3 million (2024)
  - Expenditure: ₱ 191.8 million (2024)
  - Liabilities: ₱ 208.7 million (2024)

Service provider
  - Electricity: Cagayan 2 Electric Cooperative (CAGELCO 2)
- Time zone: UTC+8 (PST)
- ZIP code: 3518
- PSGC: 0201522000
- IDD : area code: +63 (0)78
- Native languages: Ibanag; Ilocano; Tagalog
- Major religions: Pentecost, IAFB, AFB, Assembly of the first born, Catholic, IFI, Methodist
- Feast date: August 16
- Patron saint: St. Roche
- Website: www.sanchezmira-cagayan.gov.ph

Sanchez Mira, officially the Municipality of Sanchez Mira (Ibanag: Ili nat Sanchez Mira; Ilocano: Ili ti Sanchez Mira; Tagalog: Bayan ng Sanchez Mira), is a municipality in the province of Cagayan, Philippines. According to the 2024 census, it has a population of 26,292 people.

== History ==
Formerly called Malukkit or Naluqui, meaning "a place of conflict/destruction", the name "Sanchez Mira" was given in honor of Manuel Sanchez Mira, a Spanish Brigadier General assigned in the Cagayan Valley who served as the alcalde mayor of Cagayan. It was formally established as a town in 1894, with majority of its first inhabitants being Ilocanos from Paoay, Ilocos Norte. They came from notable families such as the Negre, Mackay, Cacatian, Marzan, and Paclibon.

=== Third Republic ===
On November 15, 1967, Vice Mayor P. Frafcon was assassinated by unidentified men.

== Geography ==
Lying on a latitude of 18 degrees, 34 minutes north and a longitude of 121 degrees, 14 minutes east, the municipality is bounded on the north by the Babuyan Channel; on the south by the municipality of Luna; on the east by the municipality of Pamplona; and on the west by the municipality of Claveria.

Sanchez Mira is 158.38 kilometres (98.41 mi) from the provincial capital Tuguegarao, and 629.86 kilometres (391.38 mi) from the country's capital city of Manila.

=== Barangays ===
Sanchez Mira is politically subdivided into 18 barangays. Each barangay consists of puroks while some have sitios.

- Bangan
- Callungan
- Centro I
- Centro II
- Dacal
- Dagueray
- Dammang
- Kittag
- Langagan
- Magacan
- Marzan
- Masisit
- Nagrangtayan
- Namuac
- San Andres
- Santiago
- Santor
- Tokitok

=== Climate ===
Climate data for Sanchez Mira, Cagayan
Month	Jan	Feb	Mar	Apr	May	Jun	Jul	Aug	Sep	Oct	Nov	Dec	Year
Mean daily maximum °C (°F)	25 (77)	26 (79)	29 (84)	31 (88)	31 (88)	31 (88)	30 (86)	30 (86)	30 (86)	28 (82)	27 (81)	25 (77)	29 (84)
Mean daily minimum °C (°F)	20 (68)	20 (68)	21 (70)	23 (73)	24 (75)	25 (77)	25 (77)	25 (77)	24 (75)	23 (73)	23 (73)	21 (70)	23 (73)
Average precipitation mm (inches)	120 (4.7)	77 (3.0)	62 (2.4)	40 (1.6)	118 (4.6)	138 (5.4)	162 (6.4)	173 (6.8)	143 (5.6)	198 (7.8)	185 (7.3)	248 (9.8)	1,664 (65.4)
Average rainy days	16.9	12.2	11.5	10.6	18.7	20.1	21.2	23.3	20.8	16.9	16.5	20.0	208.7
Source: Meteoblue

== Demographics ==
Population census of Sanchez Mira

Year	Pop.	±% p.a.
1903	4,329	—
1918	6,221	+2.45%
1939	9,066	+1.81%
1948	10,611	+1.76%
1960	12,315	+1.25%
1970	16,182	+2.77%
1975	17,696	+1.81%
1980	18,185	+0.55%

Year	Pop.	±% p.a.
1990	17,873	−0.17%
1995	18,904	+1.06%
2000	21,475	+2.77%
2007	23,044	+0.98%
2010	23,257	+0.34%
2015	24,541	+1.03%
2020	26,164	+1.36%
2024	26,292	+0.12%

Source: Philippine Statistics Authority

In the 2024 census, the population of Sanchez Mira was 26,292 people, with a density of 130 inhabitants per square kilometre or 340 inhabitants per square mile.

== Economy ==
Poverty incidence of Sanchez Mira (%)

Source: Philippine Statistics Authority

== Government ==
=== Local government ===
Sanchez Mira is part of the second legislative district of the province of Cagayan. It is governed by a mayor, designated as its local chief executive, and by a municipal council as its legislative body in accordance with the Local Government Code. The mayor, vice mayor, and the municipal councilors are elected directly by the people through an election held every three years.

=== Town hall ===
The current Sanchez Mira Municipal Hall was built during the tenure of Mayor Napoleon Cabuyadao Sacramed.

=== Elected officials ===
Members of the Municipal Council (2022-2025)
Position	Name
Congressman	Aline Vargas-Alfonso
Mayor	Abraham B Bagasin
Vice-Mayor	Asela B Sacramed
Councilors	Chel Monje
Councilors	Melbina Mangosing
Councilors	Kap Mama Agabin
Councilors	John Langgaman
Councilors	Jay-Ar Cabulisan
Councilors	Benjamin Oroceo
Councilors	Napoleon Malto
Councilors	Mario De Castro

== Education ==
The Schools Division of Cagayan governs the town's public education system. The division office is a field office of the Department of Education (DepEd) in the Cagayan Valley region. The Sanchez Mira Schools District Office oversees both public and private elementary and high schools across the municipality.

The first Methodist high school in the Philippines, Thoburn Memorial Academy, was established in 1945, right after World War II, by Juan Agcaoili Aragones and his wife, Serapia Perdido Negre.

=== Primary and elementary schools ===
- Bangan Elementary School
- Benlippen Christian Learning School
- C. Marzan Elementary School
- Centro United Methodist Church Kiddie School
- Callungan Elementary School
- Dacal-Pukel Elementary School
- Dagueray Elementary School
- Dammang Elementary School
- Kittag Elementary School
- Iglesia Filipina Independiente Learning Center
- Langagan Elementary School
- Masisit Elementary School
- Minanga Elementary School
- Nagrangtayan-Magacan Elementary School
- Namuac Adventist Multigrade School
- Namuac-San Andres Elementary School
- Pureg Elementary School
- San Roque Pre-school of Sanchez Mira
- Sanchez Mira West Central Elementary School
- Sanchez Mira Central Elementary School
- Sanchez Mira Institute for Lifelong Education (Elementary)
- Santiago Elementary School
- Santor Elementary School
- Shining Light Academy (Elementary School)
- Starkid Christian Learning Center
- Taguiporo Elementary School
- Tokitok Elementary School

=== Secondary schools ===
- Divine Word High School
- Namuac Academy
- Sanchez Mira Institute for Lifelong Education (High School)
- Sanchez Mira NHS
- Sanchez Mira SAT
- Shining Light Academy (High School)
- Thoburn Memorial Academy
