= Gattaran =

Municipality in Cagayan, Philippines

- Municipality
- Municipality of Gattaran
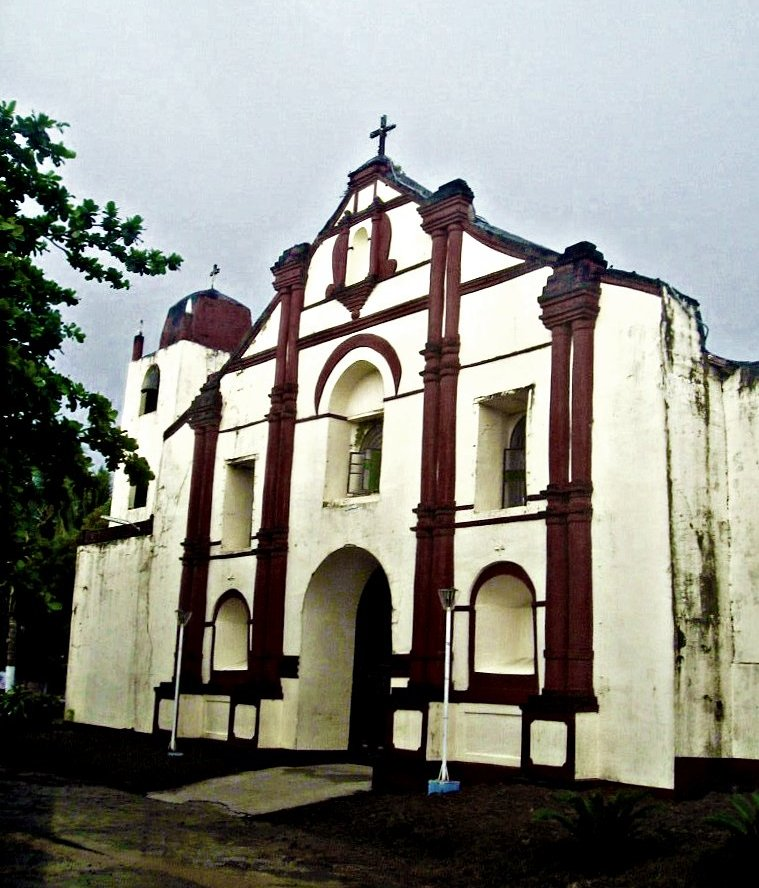
- St. Catherine of Alexandria Parish Church of Gattaran, in June 2005.

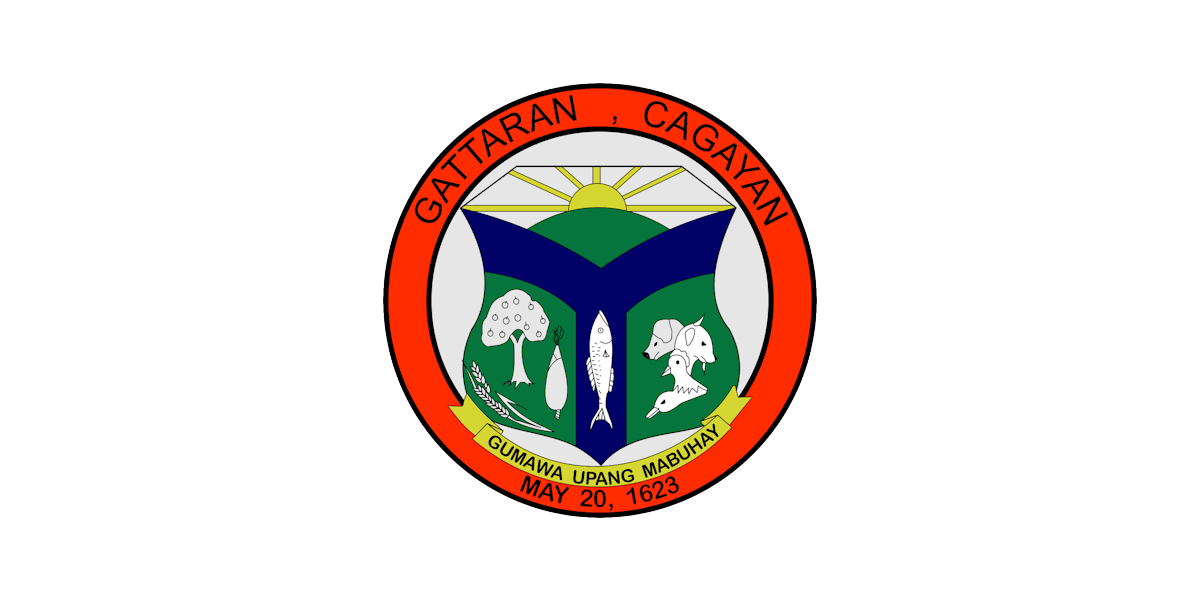
- Flag Seal
- Motto: Abante Kailian!
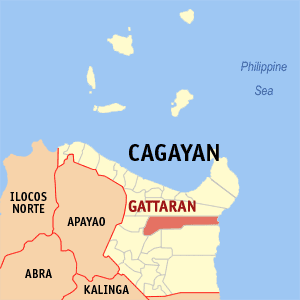
- Map of Cagayan with Gattaran highlighted
- Interactive map of Gattaran
- Location within the Philippines
- Coordinates: 18°03′40″N 121°38′43″E
- Country: Philippines
- Region: Cagayan Valley
- Province: Cagayan
- District: 1st district
- Barangays: 50 (see Barangays)

Government
  - Type: Sangguniang Bayan
  - Mayor: Matthew C. Nolasco
  - Vice Mayor: George R. Ancheta
  - Representative: Ramon C. Nolasco Jr.
  - Electorate: 36,180 voters (2025)

Area
  - Total: 707.50 km^{2} (273.17 sq mi)
- Elevation: 19 m (62 ft)
- Highest elevation: 129 m (423 ft)
- Lowest elevation: 1 m (3.3 ft)

Population (2024 census)
  - Total: 59,704
  - Density: 84.387/km^{2} (218.56/sq mi)
  - Households: 14,213

Economy
  - Income class: 1st municipal income class
  - Poverty incidence: 9.06% (2023)
  - Revenue: ₱ 382.8 million (2023, 2024)
  - Assets: ₱ 917.9 million (2023, 2024)
  - Expenditure: ₱ 313.5 million (2023, 2024)
  - Liabilities: ₱ 117.9 million (2023, 2024)

Service provider
  - Electricity: Cagayan 2 Electric Cooperative (CAGELCO 2)
- Time zone: UTC+8 (PST)
- ZIP code: 3508
- PSGC: 0201513000
- IDD : area code: +63 (0)78
- Native languages: Ibanag; Ilocano; Cagayan Agta; Tagalog

Gattaran [gɐˈt:aɾan], officially the Municipality of Gattaran (Ibanag: Ili nat Gattaran; Ilocano: Ili ti Gattaran; Tagalog: Bayan ng Gattaran), is a municipality in the province of Cagayan, Philippines. According to the 2024 census, it has a population of 59,704 people.

The town's historic spots and tourist landmarks include the Lal-lo and Gattaran Shell Middens, Magapit Protected Landscape, Maduppaper Caves, the Mapaso Hot Spring and the Tanglagan Falls whose warm and cold waters meet and flow together on one bed to become the Dummun River. Another attraction of Gattaran is Bolos Point, a wildlife sanctuary.

== Etymology ==
The town was traditionally known as 'Najiping' (now the barangay of Nassiping). In Fr. Jose Bugarin's Ibanag dictionary (orig. 1600's, but this excerpt taken from Lobato de Santo Tomas version 1854) called it 'Najjiping' from the Ibanag word for 'conjoined, twins'. "Najjiping, town of this province, named so for being where the big river, or Bannag [Cagayan River], and the small [lit. 'chico'] tributary or Itabes (Itawis) river meet."

In the Murillo Velarde Map (1734), towns in the area are identified as "Gatara" and "Nasipin". The name of Gattaran itself is believed to originate from the word gattad which means "mountain-side", a reference to the town being flanked by the Sierra Madre mountains.

== History ==
Nassiping Church ruins

In the place where Gattaran lies today were three former ecclesiastical towns: Nassiping, Dummun, and Gattaran proper. Nassiping is the oldest among the three, founded on June 15, 1596, with Santa Catalina as the patron saint; Dummun was founded on May 24, 1598, and Gattaran, May 20, 1623. Since each of these towns had few inhabitants and had only one priest to administer to their religious needs, they were merged for ecclesiastical convenience into one municipality in 1877 by virtue of a Diocesan Order from the Bishop of Nueva Segovia (Lallo). Fray Francisco Suejos, O.P. was the first Gobernadorcillo.

During the Spanish regime, the natives grew spiritually; but with the Americans, they grew educationally and the inhabitants assimilated a more sophisticated lifestyle. During the American period, Gattaran annexed the town of Nassiping, which was reduced into a barrio, in 1906. Under the Commonwealth government, the first Municipal Mayor was Melencio Adviento, who begun the construction of the present municipal building. The building was finished during the term of the next mayor, Atty. Hipolito Mandac. The municipal building was inaugurated in September, 1941. Four months after its inauguration, World War II broke out, the Japanese Forces occupied the town and all records, cadastral titles and others were confiscated by the invading forces. In 1944, the war's escalation led to the town's depopulation, with its inhabitants fleeing to the Sierra Madre or to the Zinundungan Valley in the west, now part of Lasam.

With the coming of the Americans to adding Filipino soldiers under the Philippine Commonwealth Army and Philippine Constabulary, the whole province was liberated from the Japanese forces. The first election of the Republic in 1947 made Delfino Liban the mayor. The administration marked the building of roads in the barrios, improvements of streets and others.

In 1950, the barrios of Gattaran to the west of the Cagayan River was separated to form the town of Lasam.

In the classical era, Gattaran used to be the home of hunter-gatherers who specialized in hunting mollusks. These hunter-gatherers have stockpiled their leftover mollusk shells in numerous sites in Gattaran and neighboring Lal-lo, until eventually, the shells formed into largest stock of shell-midden sites in the entire Philippines.

In 2006, the shell-midden sites of Gattaran and Lal-lo were included in the UNESCO Tentative List for World Heritage Site inclusion, a step closer to becoming a world heritage site. The shell-midden sites are currently being conserved by the local government from looting to preserve its outstanding universal value.

== Geography ==
Gattaran is situated 66.38 kilometres (41.25 mi) from the provincial capital Tuguegarao, and 551.53 kilometres (342.70 mi) from the country's capital city of Manila.

=== Barangays ===
Dyanggo Festival in Nassiping

Gattaran is politically subdivided into 50 barangays. Each barangay consists of puroks while some have sitios.

- Abra
- Aguiguican
- Bangatan Ngagan
- Baracaoit
- Baraoidan
- Barbarit
- Basao
- Bolos Point
- Cabayu
- Calaoagan Bassit
- Calaoagan Dackel
- Capiddigan
- Capissayan Norte
- Capissayan Sur
- Casicallan Sur
- Casicallan Norte
- Centro Norte (Poblacion)
- Centro Sur (Poblacion)
- Cullit
- Cumao
- Cunig
- Dummun
- Fugu
- Ganzano
- Guising
- Langgan
- Lapogan
- L. Adviento
- Mabuno
- Nabaccayan
- Naddungan
- Nagatutuan
- Nassiping
- Newagac
- Palagao Norte
- Palagao Sur
- Piña Este
- Piña Weste
- Santa Ana
- San Carlos
- San Vicente
- Santa Maria
- Sidem
- Tagumay
- Takiki
- Taligan
- Tanglagan
- T. Elizaga (Mabirbira)
- Tubungan Este
- Tubungan Weste

=== Climate ===
Climate data for Gattaran, Cagayan
Month	Jan	Feb	Mar	Apr	May	Jun	Jul	Aug	Sep	Oct	Nov	Dec	Year
Mean daily maximum °C (°F)	24 (75)	25 (77)	28 (82)	31 (88)	31 (88)	31 (88)	30 (86)	30 (86)	29 (84)	28 (82)	26 (79)	24 (75)	28 (83)
Mean daily minimum °C (°F)	20 (68)	20 (68)	21 (70)	23 (73)	24 (75)	24 (75)	24 (75)	24 (75)	24 (75)	23 (73)	23 (73)	21 (70)	23 (73)
Average precipitation mm (inches)	150 (5.9)	106 (4.2)	84 (3.3)	48 (1.9)	103 (4.1)	115 (4.5)	134 (5.3)	156 (6.1)	136 (5.4)	240 (9.4)	246 (9.7)	300 (11.8)	1,818 (71.6)
Average rainy days	19	14.3	12.8	10.8	17.7	18.9	21.5	23.3	22.1	20.4	20.3	22.2	223.3
Source: Meteoblue

== Demographics ==
Population census of Gattaran
Year	Pop.	±% p.a.
1903	2,475	—
1918	7,625	+7.79%
1939	19,889	+4.67%
1948	25,815	+2.94%
1960	20,837	−1.77%
1970	29,241	+3.44%
1975	34,595	+3.43%
1980	35,477	+0.50%
1990	41,565	+1.60%
1995	44,034	+1.09%
2000	47,804	+1.78%
2007	50,269	+0.70%
2010	54,848	+3.22%
2015	56,661	+0.62%
2020	58,874	+0.81%
2024	59,704	+0.34%
Source: Philippine Statistics Authority

In the 2024 census, the population of Gattaran was 59,704 people, with a density of 84 inhabitants per square kilometre or 220 inhabitants per square mile.

== Economy ==
Poverty incidence of Gattaran (%)

Source: Philippine Statistics Authority

== Government ==
=== Local government ===
Gattaran is part of the first legislative district of the province of Cagayan. It is governed by a mayor, designated as its local chief executive, and by a municipal council as its legislative body in accordance with the Local Government Code. The mayor, vice mayor, and the councilors are elected directly by the people through an election which is being held every three years.

=== Election officials ===
Members of the Municipal Council (2019–2022)
Position	Name
Congressman	Ramon C. Nolasco Jr.
Mayor	Matthew C. Nolasco
Vice-Mayor	George R. Ancheta
Councilors	Roel A. Agulay
Councilors	Dennis A. Domingo
Councilors	Marlon V. Binueza
Councilors	Anthony Blaine B. Domingo
Councilors	Marissa V. Mabba
Councilors	Rogelio D. Marron Sr.
Councilors	Arnold U. Jimenez Sr.
Councilors	Venus U. Rabina

== Education ==
The Schools Division of Cagayan governs the town's public education system. The division office is a field office of the DepEd in Cagayan Valley region. There are two schools district offices which govern both the public and private elementary and high schools throughout the municipality. These are Gattaran East District, and Gattaran West District.

=== Primary and elementary schools ===
- Abra Elementary School
- Agnaoan Primary School
- Aguiguican Elementary School
- Alberto C. Antonio Primary School
- Basao Elementary School
- Bolos Point Elementary School
- Capissayan Norte Elementary School
- Capissayan Elementary School
- Casicallan Elementary School
- Creative Dream Christian Academy
- Cumao Elementary School
- Don Jorge Nolasco Primary School
- Dummun Elementary School
- Ganzano Elementary School
- Gattaran East Central School
- Gattaran West Central School
- Guising Elementary School
- L. Adviento Elementary School
- Lapogan Elementary School
- Mabuno Elementary School
- Mananingot Primary School
- Nagatutuan Elementary School
- Nassiping Elementary School
- Piña Este Elementary School
- Piña Weste Elementary School
- Pinutulan Primary School
- San Carlos Elementary School
- San Vicente Elementary School
- Tanglagan Elementary School
- Rissic Elementary School

=== Secondary schools ===
- Calaoagan Dackel National High School (Capissayan Annex)
- Capissayan Sur UMC Learning School
- Don Mariano Marcos National High School
- Guising Adventist Multigrade School
- Northern Philippines Academy
- St. Catherine's Academy

== Notable personalities ==
- Silvestre Bello III, a Filipino politician
