= Legislative districts of Cagayan =

Districts in Philippines province

The legislative districts of Cagayan are the representations of the province of Cagayan in the various national legislatures of the Philippines. The province is currently represented in the lower house of the Congress of the Philippines through its first, second, and third congressional districts.

== History ==
Cagayan, which included the sub-province of Batanes, was initially divided into two representative districts in 1907. Batanes was last represented as part of the province's first district in 1909, after its re-establishment as a province by virtue of Act No. 1952 enacted on May 20, 1909, warranted its separate representation. A minor adjustment of district boundaries, mandated by Act No. 3032 enacted on March 19, 1922, took effect starting in the 1922 elections.

When seats for the upper house of the Philippine Legislature were elected from territory-based districts between 1916 and 1935, Cagayan formed part of the first senatorial district which elected two out of the 24-member senate. However, residents of two towns that had been annexed from Mountain Province — Allacapan (1928) and Langangan (1922) — were not extended the right to vote in assembly or senatorial elections until 1935, after the passage of Act No. 4203 placed them in the second district of Cagayan.

By virtue of Executive Order No. 84 issued by Philippine Executive Commission Chairman Jorge Vargas on August 31, 1942, the province of Batanes was abolished and its territory was placed under Cagayan's jurisdiction for the duration of the Second World War. Two delegates represented the province in the National Assembly of the Japanese-sponsored Second Philippine Republic: one was the provincial governor (an ex officio member), while the other was elected through a provincial assembly of KALIBAPI members during the Japanese occupation of the Philippines. Upon the restoration of the Philippine Commonwealth in 1945, the province retained its two pre-war representative districts, and Batanes was once again represented separately.

The province was represented in the Interim Batasang Pambansa as part of Region II from 1978 to 1984, and elected two representatives, at large, to the Regular Batasang Pambansa in 1984. Cagayan was reapportioned into three congressional districts under the new Constitution which was proclaimed on February 11, 1987, and elected members to the restored House of Representatives starting that same year.

== 1st District ==
- Municipalities: Alcala, Aparri, Baggao, Buguey, Camalaniugan, Gattaran, Gonzaga, Lal-lo, Santa Ana, Santa Teresita
- Population (2020): 459,819

Period	Representative
8th Congress; 1987–1992	Domingo A. Tuzon
9th Congress; 1992–1995	Juan Ponce Enrile
10th Congress; 1995–1998	Patricio T. Antonio
11th Congress; 1998–2001	Juan C. Ponce Enrile, Jr.
12th Congress; 2001–2004	Juan C. Ponce Enrile, Jr.
13th Congress; 2004–2007	Juan C. Ponce Enrile, Jr.
14th Congress; 2007–2010	Salvacion S. Ponce Enrile
15th Congress; 2010–2013	Juan C. Ponce Enrile, Jr.
16th Congress; 2013–2016	Salvacion S. Ponce Enrile
17th Congress; 2016–2019	Ramon C. Nolasco Sr.
18th Congress; 2019–2022	Ramon C. Nolasco Jr.
19th Congress; 2022–2025	Ramon C. Nolasco Jr.
20th Congress; 2025–2028	Ramon C. Nolasco Sr.

=== 1907–1909 ===
- Municipalities: Alcala, Amulung, Aparri, Baggao, Basco, Calayan, Camalaniugan, Gattaran, Iguig, Lal-lo, Peñablanca, Tuguegarao

Period	Representative
1st Philippine Legislature; 1907–1909	Pablo Guzman

=== 1909–1922 ===
- Municipalities: Alcala, Amulung, Aparri, Baggao, Calayan (annexed to Aparri from 1912 to 1920), Camalaniugan, Gattaran, Iguig, Lal-lo, Peñablanca, Tuguegarao, Ballesteros (established 1911), Gonzaga (established 1917)

Period	Representative
2nd Philippine Legislature; 1909–1912	Venancio Concepcion
3rd Philippine Legislature; 1912–1916	Cresencio Marasigan
4th Philippine Legislature; 1916–1919	Vicente T. Fernandez
5th Philippine Legislature; 1919–1922	Miguel Concepcion Nava

=== 1922–1972 ===
- Municipalities: Alcala, Amulung, Aparri, Baggao, Calayan, Camalaniugan, Gattaran, Gonzaga, Iguig, Lal-lo, Peñablanca, Tuguegarao, Santa Ana (established 1949), Santa Teresita (established 1963)

Period	Representative
6th Philippine Legislature; 1922–1925	Alfonso Ponce Enrile
7th Philippine Legislature; 1925–1928	Vicente Formoso
8th Philippine Legislature; 1928–1931	Vicente Formoso
9th Philippine Legislature; 1931–1934	Marcelo Adduru
10th Philippine Legislature; 1934–1935	Nicanor Carag
1st National Assembly; 1935–1938	Marcelo Adduru
2nd National Assembly; 1938–1941	Conrado V. Singson
1st Commonwealth Congress; 1945	Nicanor Carag
1st Congress; 1946–1949	Conrado V. Singson
2nd Congress; 1949–1953	Domingo S. Siazon
3rd Congress; 1953–1957	Felipe R. Garduque, Jr.
4th Congress; 1957–1961	Felipe R. Garduque, Jr.
5th Congress; 1961–1965	Tito Dupaya
6th Congress; 1965–1969	Tito Dupaya
7th Congress; 1969–1972	Tito Dupaya

== 2nd District ==
- Municipalities: Abulug, Allacapan, Ballesteros, Calayan, Claveria, Lasam, Pamplona, Piat, Rizal, Sanchez-Mira, Santa Praxedes, Santo Niño
- Population (2020): 322,634

Period	Representative
8th Congress; 1987–1992	Leoncio M. Puzon
9th Congress; 1992–1995	Edgar R. Lara
10th Congress; 1995–1998	Edgar R. Lara
11th Congress; 1998–2001	Edgar R. Lara
12th Congress; 2001–2004	Celia C. Tagana-Layus
13th Congress; 2004–2007	Florencio L. Vargas (Note: Elected as representative for 15th Congress but died on July 22, 2010 before the opening session.)
14th Congress; 2007–2010	Florencio L. Vargas
15th Congress; 2010–2013	vacant (Note: Cagayan 1st District Representative Juan Ponce-Enrile Jr. was the designated legislative caretaker of the district from December 2010 to March 2011.)
15th Congress; 2010–2013	Baby Aline Vargas-Alfonso (Note: Assumed office on March 16, 2011, after winning special election.)
16th Congress; 2013–2016	Baby Aline Vargas-Alfonso
17th Congress; 2016–2019	Baby Aline Vargas-Alfonso
18th Congress; 2019–2022	Samantha Louise V. Alfonso
19th Congress; 2022–2025	Baby Aline Vargas-Alfonso
20th Congress; 2025–2028	Baby Aline Vargas-Alfonso

=== 1907–1922 ===
- Municipalities: Abulug, Claveria, Enrile, Faire, Mauanan, Pamplona, Piat, Sanchez-Mira, Solana, Tuao

Period	Representative
1st Philippine Legislature; 1907–1909	Gabriel Lasam
2nd Philippine Legislature; 1909–1912	Leoncio Fonacier
3rd Philippine Legislature; 1912–1916	Juan Quintos
4th Philippine Legislature; 1916–1919	Miguel C. Nava
5th Philippine Legislature; 1919–1922	Bonifacio Cortez

=== 1922–1935 ===
- Municipalities: Abulug, Ballesteros, Claveria, Enrile, Santo Niño (Faire), Rizal (Mauanan), Pamplona, Piat, Sanchez-Mira, Solana, Tuao

Period	Representative
6th Philippine Legislature; 1922–1925	Proceso Sebastian
7th Philippine Legislature; 1925–1928	Antonio Guzman
8th Philippine Legislature; 1928–1931	Claro Sabbun
9th Philippine Legislature; 1931–1934	Sabas Casibang
10th Philippine Legislature; 1934–1935	Miguel P. Pio

=== 1935–1972 ===
- Municipalities: Abulug, Ballesteros, Claveria, Enrile, Santo Niño (Faire), Rizal (Mauanan), Pamplona, Piat, Sanchez-Mira, Solana, Tuao, Santa Praxedes (Langangan) (annexed from Mountain Province 1922; only voted starting 1935), Allacapan (annexed from Mountain Province 1928; only voted starting 1935), Lasam (established 1950)

Period	Representative
1st National Assembly; 1935–1938	Regino Veridiano
2nd National Assembly; 1938–1941	Miguel P. Pio
1st Commonwealth Congress; 1945	Miguel P. Pio
1st Congress; 1946–1949	Paulino A. Alonzo
2nd Congress; 1949–1953	Paulino A. Alonzo
3rd Congress; 1953–1957	Paulino A. Alonzo
4th Congress; 1957–1961	Benjamin Ligot
5th Congress; 1961–1965	Benjamin Ligot
6th Congress; 1965–1969	Benjamin Ligot
7th Congress; 1969–1972	David M. Puzon

== 3rd District ==
- City: Tuguegarao (became city 1999)
- Municipalities: Amulung, Enrile, Iguig, Peñablanca, Solana, Tuao
- Population (2020): 486,150

Period	Representative
8th Congress; 1987–1992	Tito Dupaya
9th Congress; 1992–1995	Francisco K. Mamba
10th Congress; 1995–1998	Manuel N. Mamba
11th Congress; 1998–2001	Rodolfo E. Aguinaldo (Note: Died on June 12, 2001.)
12th Congress; 2001–2004	Manuel N. Mamba
13th Congress; 2004–2007	Manuel N. Mamba
13th Congress; 2007–2010	Manuel N. Mamba
15th Congress; 2010–2013	Randolph Ting
16th Congress; 2013–2016	Randolph Ting
17th Congress; 2016–2019	Randolph Ting
18th Congress; 2019–2022	Joseph L. Lara
19th Congress; 2022–2025	Joseph L. Lara
20th Congress; 2025–2028	Joseph L. Lara

== At-Large (defunct) ==
=== 1943–1944 ===
- includes the sub-province of Batanes

Period	Representatives
National Assembly; 1943–1944	Melecio Arranz
National Assembly; 1943–1944	Nicanor Carag (ex officio)

=== 1984–1986 ===
Period	Representatives
Regular Batasang Pambansa; 1984–1986	Antonio C. Carag
Regular Batasang Pambansa; 1984–1986	Juan Ponce Enrile
Regular Batasang Pambansa; 1984–1986	Alfonso R. Reyno, Jr.

== See also ==
- Legislative district of Batanes
- Legislative district of Mountain Province
