= Santa Praxedes, Cagayan =

Municipality in Cagayan, Philippines

Santa Praxedes Langangan
- Municipality
- Municipality of Santa Praxedes, Municipality of Langangan, Municipal District of Langangan, Township of Langangan
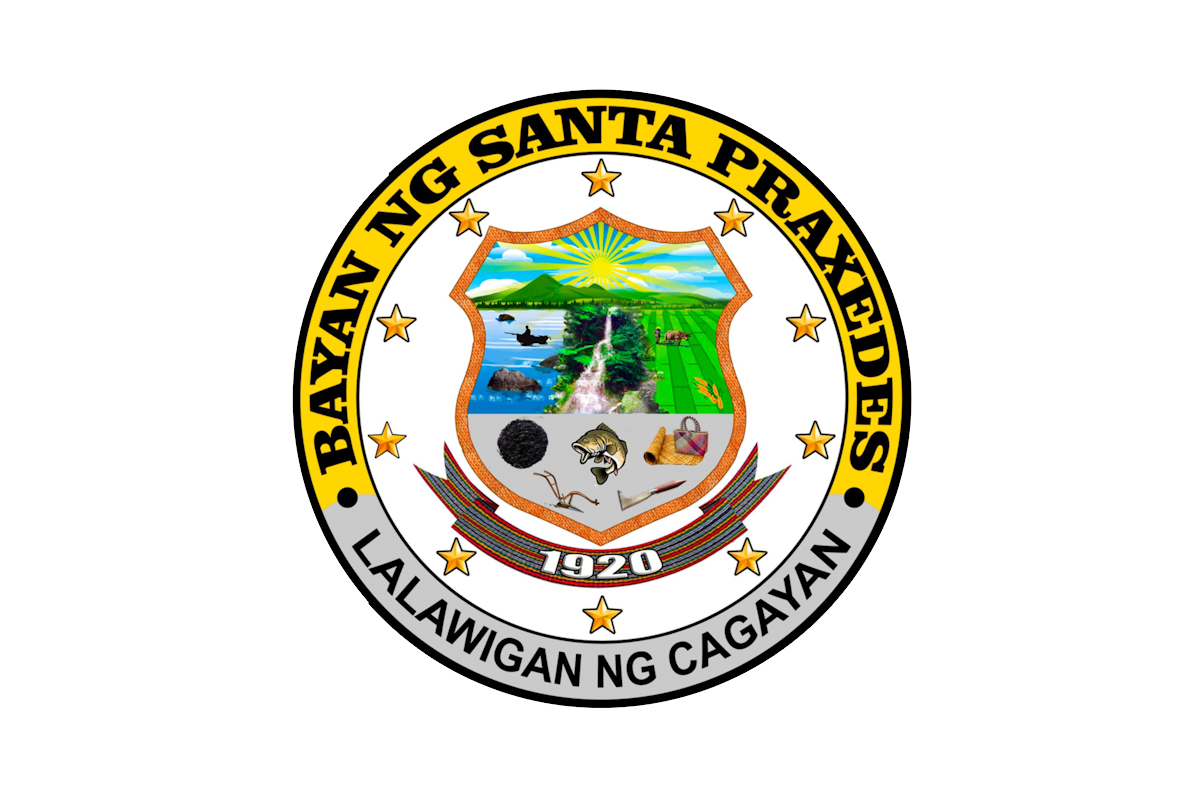
- Flag Seal

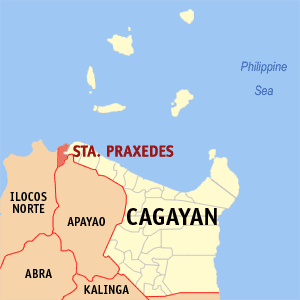
- Map of Cagayan with Santa Praxedes highlighted
- Interactive map of Santa Praxedes
- Location within the Philippines
- Coordinates: 18°33′58″N 120°59′24″E
- Country: Philippines
- Region: Cagayan Valley
- Province: Cagayan
- District: 2nd district
- Named for: Saint Práxedes; Praxedes Ligot
- Barangays: 10 (see Barangays)

Government
  - Type: Sangguniang Bayan
  - Mayor: Esterlina A. Aguinaldo
  - Vice Mayor: Rene D. Estabillo
  - Representative: Samantha Louise V. Alfonso
  - Electorate: 3,309 voters (2025)

Area
  - Total: 109.97 km^{2} (42.46 sq mi)
- Elevation: 163 m (535 ft)
- Highest elevation: 693 m (2,274 ft)
- Lowest elevation: 0 m (0 ft)

Population (2024 census)
  - Total: 4,643
  - Density: 42.22/km^{2} (109.4/sq mi)
  - Households: 1,071

Economy
  - Income class: 5th municipal income class
  - Poverty incidence: 5.71% (2023)
  - Revenue: ₱ 100 million (2024)
  - Assets: ₱ 309.9 million (2024)
  - Expenditure: ₱ 100.3 million (2024)
  - Liabilities: ₱ 53.44 million (2024)

Service provider
  - Electricity: Cagayan 2 Electric Cooperative (CAGELCO 2)
- Time zone: UTC+8 (PST)
- ZIP code: 3521
- PSGC: 0201524000
- IDD : area code: +63 (0)78
- Native languages: Ilocano; Ibanag; Isnag; Tagalog

Santa Praxedes, officially the Municipality of Santa Praxedes (Ibanag: Ili nat Santa Praxedes; Ilocano: Ili ti Santa Praxedes; Tagalog: Bayan ng Santa Praxedes), is a municipality in the province of Cagayan, Philippines. According to the 2024 census, it has a population of 4,643 people, making it the least populated municipality in the province.

== History ==
The town's original names were Capan-awan and Langangan (Lang-ga-ngan), which means "Sagapa", a round piece of rattan work to hold in place earthen pots, Municipal officials then petitioned for a change of name through Representative Benjamin Ligot. Under Republic Act No. 4149 which he authored in 1966, Langangan was renamed into Sta. Praxedes in honor of the name of Congressman Ligot’s mother, Doña Praxedes Ligot.

The town was formerly part of Claveria until 1922. The first settlers were known to be the emigrants from the provinces of Ilocos Sur (from the municipalities of Sinait and Magsingal) and Ilocos Norte (from the municipalities of Pasuquin, Badoc and Pinili). The early settlers in this municipality were the Agamanos, Agnir, Aguinaldo, Aguirre, Agullana, Bumanglag, Estabillo, Llapitan, Madamba, Pagdilao, Ragsac, Rivera, and the Sanchez families.

There have been moves by the municipal council to regain political control over some barangays of the neighboring municipality of Claveria, particularly the barangays of Cadcadir, Lablabig, Mabnang, Union, Kilkiling and Siam-Siam. These barangays were once part of Santa Praxedes but lost them when the municipality was transferred to the provincial jurisdiction of Ilocos Norte.

== Geography ==
It borders the Ilocos Norte municipality of Pagudpud to the west; Calanasan, Apayao, to the south-west; Claveria, Cagayan, to the east. It also shares a third of the area of the Calvario National Park along with the municipality of Pagudpud. Taiwan directly to the north of Luzon Island via Luzon Strait to Bashi Channel.

The central plain is situated in a valley enveloped by the Cordillera Mountains. It is also one of the coastal towns of Cagayan that does not have direct road access to its seacoast due to the high mountains surrounding it.

Santa Praxedes is situated 195.83 kilometres (121.68 mi) from the provincial capital Tuguegarao, and 592.41 kilometres (368.11 mi) from the country's capital city of Manila.

=== Barangays ===
Santa Praxedes is politically subdivided into 10 barangays. Each barangay consists of puroks while some have sitios.

The poblacion of the municipality consists of two barangays, Centro-Uno and Centro-Dos, which are situated in the valley surrounded by the northern tip of the Cordilleras.

- Cadongdongan
- Capacuan
- Centro I (Poblacion)
- Centro II (Poblacion)
- Macatel
- Portabaga
- San Juan
- San Miguel
- Salungsong
- Sicul

=== Climate ===
Climate data for Santa Praxedes, Cagayan
Month	Jan	Feb	Mar	Apr	May	Jun	Jul	Aug	Sep	Oct	Nov	Dec	Year
Mean daily maximum °C (°F)	25 (77)	26 (79)	28 (82)	30 (86)	30 (86)	29 (84)	28 (82)	28 (82)	28 (82)	27 (81)	26 (79)	25 (77)	28 (81)
Mean daily minimum °C (°F)	18 (64)	18 (64)	20 (68)	21 (70)	23 (73)	24 (75)	23 (73)	23 (73)	23 (73)	21 (70)	21 (70)	19 (66)	21 (70)
Average precipitation mm (inches)	55 (2.2)	41 (1.6)	37 (1.5)	41 (1.6)	184 (7.2)	215 (8.5)	261 (10.3)	256 (10.1)	245 (9.6)	216 (8.5)	142 (5.6)	129 (5.1)	1,822 (71.8)
Average rainy days	14.1	11.1	11.8	12.5	21.8	25.2	25.5	24.9	23.8	18.2	16.4	17.0	222.3
Source: Meteoblue

As in the other part of the country, the municipality has two seasons: the wet and dry seasons. It has a longer wet season, unlike most parts of the country that enjoy almost equal periods of wet and dry seasons. The wet season normally starts in the last week of May and lasts up to the end of January. It is during the later months of this season that the famous "gamet" or "nori" grows along its rocky seacoast. The dry season starts by the end of January till the end of May.

== Demographics ==
Population census of Santa Praxedes

Year	Pop.	±% p.a.
1918	1,191	—
1939	812	−1.81%
1948	1,095	+3.38%
1960	1,530	+2.83%
1970	1,921	+2.30%
1975	2,206	+2.81%
1980	2,211	+0.05%
1990	2,514	+1.29%

Year	Pop.	±% p.a.
1995	2,709	+1.41%
2000	2,952	+1.86%
2007	3,379	+1.88%
2010	3,646	+2.81%
2015	4,154	+2.52%
2020	4,434	+1.38%
2024	4,643	+1.11%

Source: Philippine Statistics Authority

In the 2024 census, the population of Santa Praxedes was 4,643 people, with a density of 42 inhabitants per square kilometer or 110 inhabitants per square mile.

=== Language ===
Ilocano is the main language but a portion of the population also speaks Isneg (locally known as Yapayao) as part of the population hailed from the Calanasan, Apayao, when the municipality was a part of the former Kalinga-Apayao province.

== Economy ==
Poverty incidence of Santa Praxedes (%)

Source: Philippine Statistics Authority

Economic activity consists mainly of fishing, farming and tourism. Currently, the local government is further developing both Portabaga Falls Park and Resort in Barangay Portabaga, and Mingay Beach Camp in Barangay San Juan.

Limited economic activities and lack of job opportunity forced many of its skilled professionals opted to work outside the municipality and many have already immigrated to other countries for better career prospect and for greater economic stability.

=== Tourism ===
There is a lot of potential of the town in ecotourism but due to undeveloped infrastructure, tourism spots such as Sicul Falls and Hotsprings as well as Macatel Falls were seldom visited.

- Portabaga Falls Park and Resort - a 25-meter (82 ft) single-drop waterfall having four downstream catch pools
- Mingay Beach Camp - a newly opened tourist destination that can be reached through a 30-45 minute hike from the top of the mountain in Barangay San Juan, or a 30-45 minute boat ride from Barangay Taggat Norte, Claveria
- Kimmansir Beach - a 120-meter-long (390 ft) beach with white rocks situated near the boundary of Cagayan and Ilocos Norte.
- Likid Falls and Bondor Falls in Barangay Sicul
- Mapudot Hotspring in Barangay Cadongdongan
- Bunot River in Barangay Cadongdongan
- Kimmatiguid Falls in Barangay Salungsong - a series of 11 water falls that is suitable for canyoneering
- Macatel Falls in Barangay Macatel

== Government ==
=== Local government ===
Santa Praxedes is part of the second legislative district of the province of Cagayan. It is governed by a mayor, designated as its local chief executive, and by a municipal council as its legislative body in accordance with the Local Government Code. The mayor, vice mayor, and the municipal councilors are elected directly by the people through an election held every three years.

=== Elected officials ===
Members of the Municipal Council (2019–2022)
Position	Name
Congressman	Samantha Louise V. Alfonso
Mayor	Esterlina A. Aguinaldo
Vice-Mayor	Rene D. Estabillo
Councilors	Carlo A. Cachapero
Councilors	Christopher B. Aguirre
Councilors	Mark Robenson S. Dela Cruz
Councilors	Angel R. Tauyan
Councilors	Gil G. Buenavista
Councilors	Joseph C. Icalla
Councilors	Edgardo C. Aguino
Councilors	Frankwilner A. Llapitan

== Controversy ==
Being a small town and the fact that its inhabitants are related by ancestry, recent political development created friction among political clans. Among other factor is that politicians are mainly late-comer emigrants from neighboring municipalities and provinces thus in the 2016 national election, claims of illegal voters or "flying voters" were uncovered by the local election office. Such controversy was resolved before election.

== Transportation ==
The municipality is 595 kilometers (370 mi) north of Manila via Laoag and 192 kilometers (119 mi) northwest of Tuguegarao, the province's capital. Bus companies serving the town are GV Florida Transport (Manila–Junction Luna v/v via Laoag), GMW Trans (Laoag–Tuguegarao/Santiago) and Claveria Tours Transport (Laoag - Claveria) on a daily regular basis.

== Communication ==
Although it has a small population, it enjoys full coverage of Smart and Globe cellular networks which residents use to connect to the Internet.

== Education ==
The Schools Division of Cagayan governs the town's public education system. The division office is a field office of the DepEd in Cagayan Valley region. The Sta. Praxedes Schools District Office governs the public and private elementary and high schools throughout the municipality.

=== Primary and elementary schools ===
- Cadcadir Elementary School
- Cadongdongan Elementary School
- Capacuan Elementary School
- Kilkiling Elementary School
- Lablabig Elementary School
- Mabnang Elementary School
- Sta. Praxedes Central School
- Taggat Norte Elementary School
- Taggat Sur Elementary School
- Union Elementary School

=== Secondary school ===
- Sta. Praxedes High School
