= Santo Niño, Cagayan =

Municipality in Cagayan, Philippines

Santo Niño Faire
- Municipality
- Municipality of Santo Niño
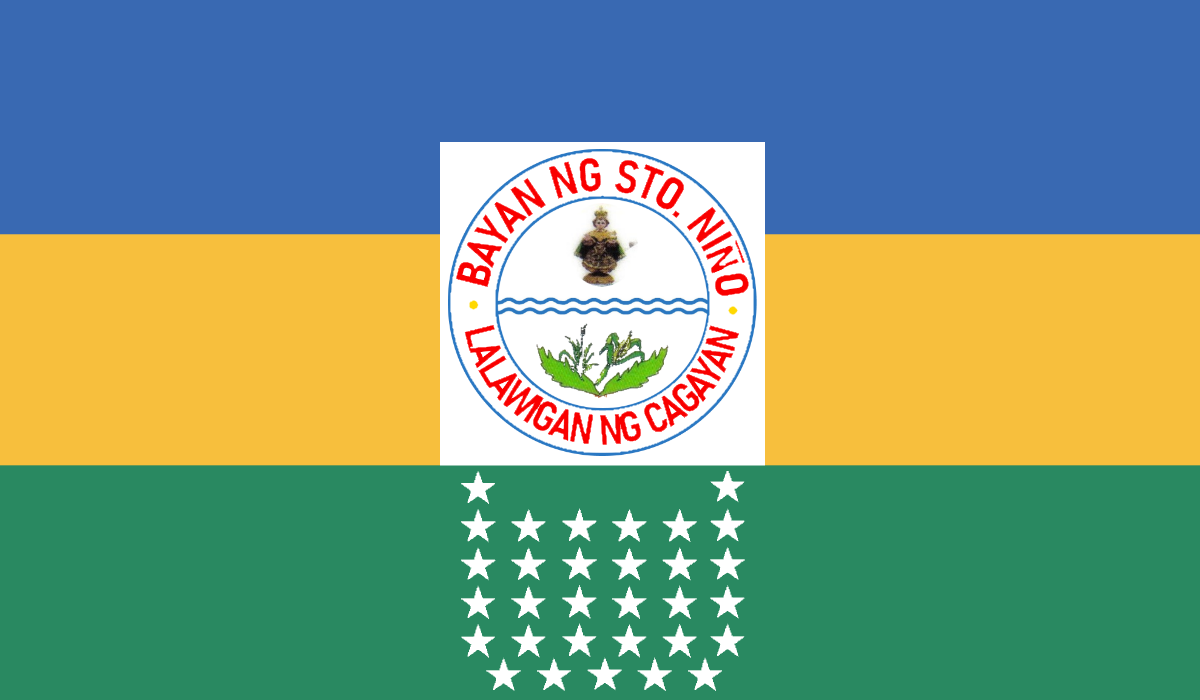
- Flag

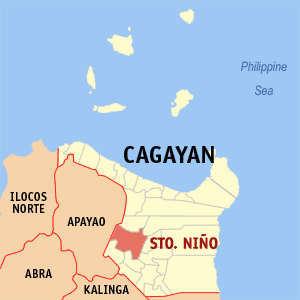
- Map of Cagayan with Santo Niño highlighted
- Interactive map of Santo Niño
- Location within the Philippines
- Coordinates: 17°53′10″N 121°34′09″E
- Country: Philippines
- Region: Cagayan Valley
- Province: Cagayan
- District: 2nd district
- Barangays: 31 (see Barangays)

Government
  - Type: Sangguniang Bayan
  - Mayor: Vicente G. Pagurayan
  - Vice Mayor: Andrew Vincent R. Pagurayan
  - Representative: Samantha Louise V. Alfonso
  - Electorate: 19,313 voters (2025)

Area
  - Total: 512.90 km^{2} (198.03 sq mi)
- Elevation: 111 m (364 ft)
- Highest elevation: 721 m (2,365 ft)
- Lowest elevation: 3 m (9.8 ft)

Population (2024 census)
  - Total: 29,066
  - Density: 56.670/km^{2} (146.77/sq mi)
  - Households: 7,174

Economy
  - Income class: 1st municipal income class
  - Poverty incidence: 11.04% (2023)
  - Revenue: ₱ 254.6 million (2024)
  - Assets: ₱ 797.3 million (2024)
  - Expenditure: ₱ 199.6 million (2024)
  - Liabilities: ₱ 148 million (2024)

Service provider
  - Electricity: Cagayan 1 Electric Cooperative (CAGELCO 1)
- Time zone: UTC+8 (PST)
- ZIP code: 3525
- PSGC: 0201526000
- IDD : area code: +63 (0)78
- Native languages: Ibanag; Ilocano; Itawis; Tagalog

Santo Niño, officially the Municipality of Santo Niño (Ibanag: Ili nat Santo Niño; Ilocano: Ili ti Santo Niño; Tagalog: Bayan ng Santo Niño), formerly known as Faire, is a municipality in the province of Cagayan, Philippines. According to the 2024 census, it has a population of 29,066 people.

== History ==
The town, originally known as Cabarungan, was officially established as the town of Santo Niño by virtue of a Spanish Royal Decree dated November 27, 1897. In 1914, it was renamed Faire in honor of Don Manuel Faire, a prominent Ilocano immigrant who played a key role in advocating for the town's formal creation. The town later reverted to its original name in subsequent years.

== Geography ==
Santo Niño is situated 52.57 kilometres (32.67 mi) from the provincial capital Tuguegarao, and 520.47 kilometres (323.41 mi) from the country's capital city of Manila.

=== Barangays ===
Santo Niño is politically subdivided into 31 barangays. Each barangay consists of puroks while some have sitios.

- Abariongan Ruar
- Abariongan Uneg
- Balagan
- Balanni
- Cabayo
- Calapangan
- Calassitan
- Campo
- Centro Norte (Poblacion)
- Centro Sur (Poblacion)
- Dungao
- Lattac
- Lipatan
- Lubo
- Mabitbitnong
- Mapitac
- Masical
- Matalao
- Nag-uma (Nagbayugan)
- Namuccayan
- Niug Norte
- Niug Sur
- Palusao
- San Manuel
- San Roque
- Santa Felicitas
- Santa Maria
- Sidiran
- Tabang
- Tamucco
- Virginia

=== Climate ===
Climate data for Santo Niño, Cagayan
Month	Jan	Feb	Mar	Apr	May	Jun	Jul	Aug	Sep	Oct	Nov	Dec	Year
Mean daily maximum °C (°F)	25 (77)	27 (81)	29 (84)	32 (90)	32 (90)	31 (88)	31 (88)	31 (88)	30 (86)	29 (84)	27 (81)	25 (77)	29 (85)
Mean daily minimum °C (°F)	20 (68)	21 (70)	22 (72)	23 (73)	24 (75)	25 (77)	25 (77)	25 (77)	24 (75)	23 (73)	23 (73)	21 (70)	23 (73)
Average precipitation mm (inches)	133 (5.2)	87 (3.4)	68 (2.7)	44 (1.7)	127 (5.0)	134 (5.3)	160 (6.3)	162 (6.4)	134 (5.3)	192 (7.6)	194 (7.6)	260 (10.2)	1,695 (66.7)
Average rainy days	18.1	13.3	13.3	11.8	19.7	20.9	22.8	22.8	20.3	16.6	18.4	21.7	219.7
Source: Meteoblue

== Demographics ==
Population census of Santo Niño

Year	Pop.	±% p.a.
1903	4,069	—
1918	5,421	+1.93%
1939	8,877	+2.38%
1948	9,947	+1.27%
1960	13,981	+2.88%
1970	16,923	+1.93%
1975	18,638	+1.95%
1980	19,493	+0.90%

Year	Pop.	±% p.a.
1990	18,608	−0.46%
1995	21,151	+2.43%
2000	22,752	+1.58%
2007	25,688	+1.69%
2010	26,126	+0.62%
2015	27,219	+0.78%
2020	28,537	+1.00%
2024	29,066	+0.44%

Source: Philippine Statistics Authority

In the 2024 census, the population of Santo Niño was 29,066 people, with a density of 57 inhabitants per square kilometre or 150 inhabitants per square mile.

== Economy ==
Poverty incidence of Santo Niño (%)

Source: Philippine Statistics Authority

== Government ==
=== Local government ===
Santo Niño is part of the second legislative district of the province of Cagayan. It is governed by a mayor, designated as its local chief executive, and by a municipal council as its legislative body in accordance with the Local Government Code. The mayor, vice mayor, and the municipal councilors are elected directly by the people through an election held every three years.

=== Elected officials ===
Members of the Municipal Council (2019–2022)
Position	Name
Congressman	Samantha Louise V. Alfonso
Mayor	Vicente G. Pagurayan
Vice-Mayor	Marites E. Cuntapay
Councilors	Eden M. Aquinaldo
Councilors	Romeo P. Pecson
Councilors	Edgar T. Tulali
Councilors	Detilinda C. Carag
Councilors	Jose C. Carodan
Councilors	Divinia L. Baltazar
Councilors	Arnold D. Fidel
Councilors	Ismael M. Macasaddu

== Education ==
The Schools Division of Cagayan governs the town's public education system. The division office is a field office of the DepEd in Cagayan Valley region. The Sto. Niño Schools District Office governs the public and private elementary and high schools throughout the municipality.

=== Primary and elementary schools ===
- Abariongan Ruar Elementary School
- Abariongan Uneg Elementary School
- Balagan Elementary School
- Balanni Elementary School
- Cabayo Primary School
- Calapangan Elementary School
- Calassitan Elementary School
- Campo Elementary School
- Dungao Integrated School (Elementary)
- Lagum Elementary School
- Lattac Elementary School
- Lipatan Integrated School (Elementary)
- Lubo Elementary School
- Mabitbitnong Primary School
- Mapitac Primary School
- Matalao Elementary School
- Nag-Uma Elementary School
- Namuccayan Integrated School (Elementary)
- Niug Elementary School
- Niug Norte Elementary School
- Palusao Elementary School
- San Manuel Elementary School
- Sidiran Elementary School
- Sta. Felicitas Elementary School
- Sta. Maria Elementary School
- Sto. Nino Central Elementary School
- Tabang Elementary School
- Tamucco Elementary School
- Virginia Elementary School

=== Secondary schools ===
- Abariongan National High School
- Dungao Integrated School
- Lipatan Integrated School
- Lubo National High School
- Namuccayan Integrated School
- Sto. Nino National High School
- Veridiano Academy Foundation

== See also ==
- List of renamed cities and municipalities in the Philippines
