= Allacapan =

Municipality in Cagayan, Philippines

- Municipality
- Municipality of Allacapan
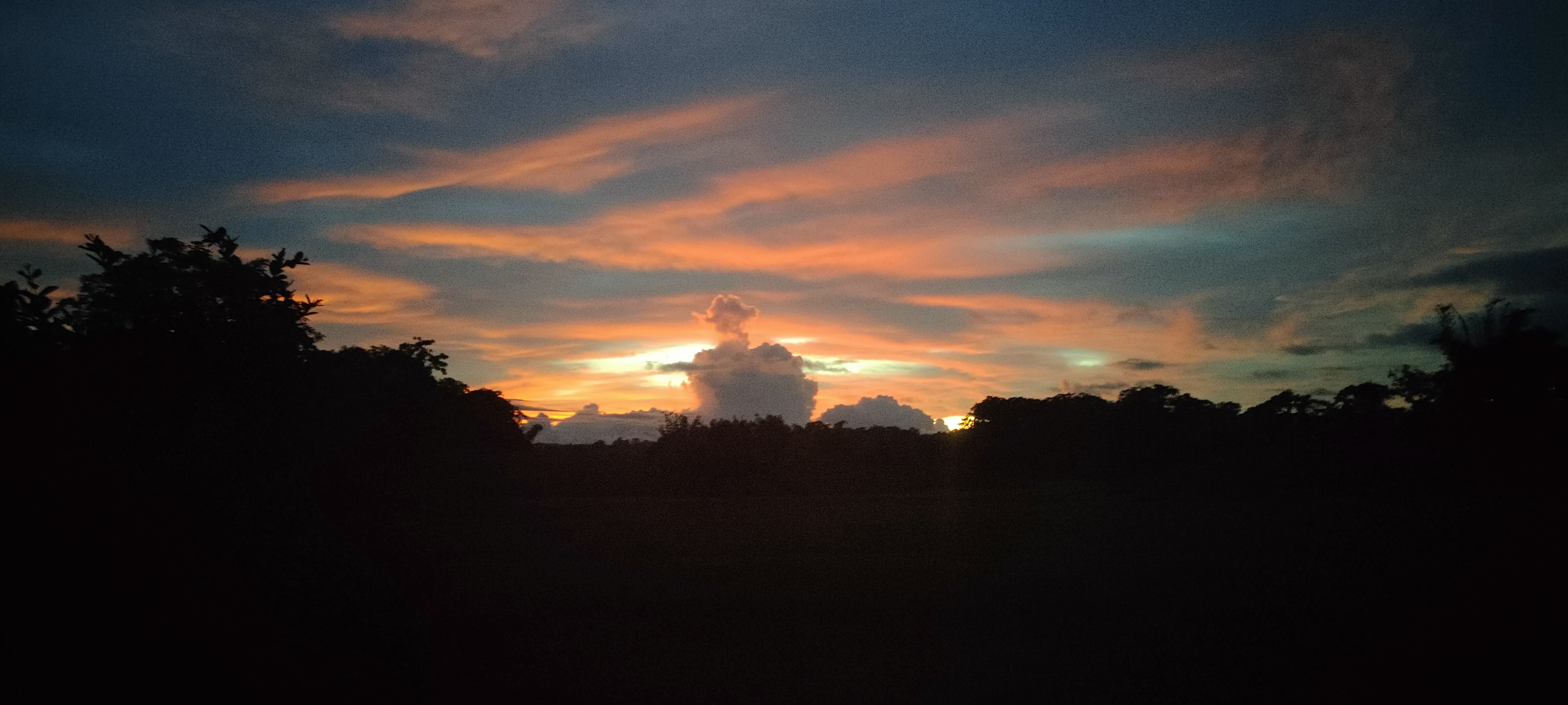
- Sunset view in Barangay Labben

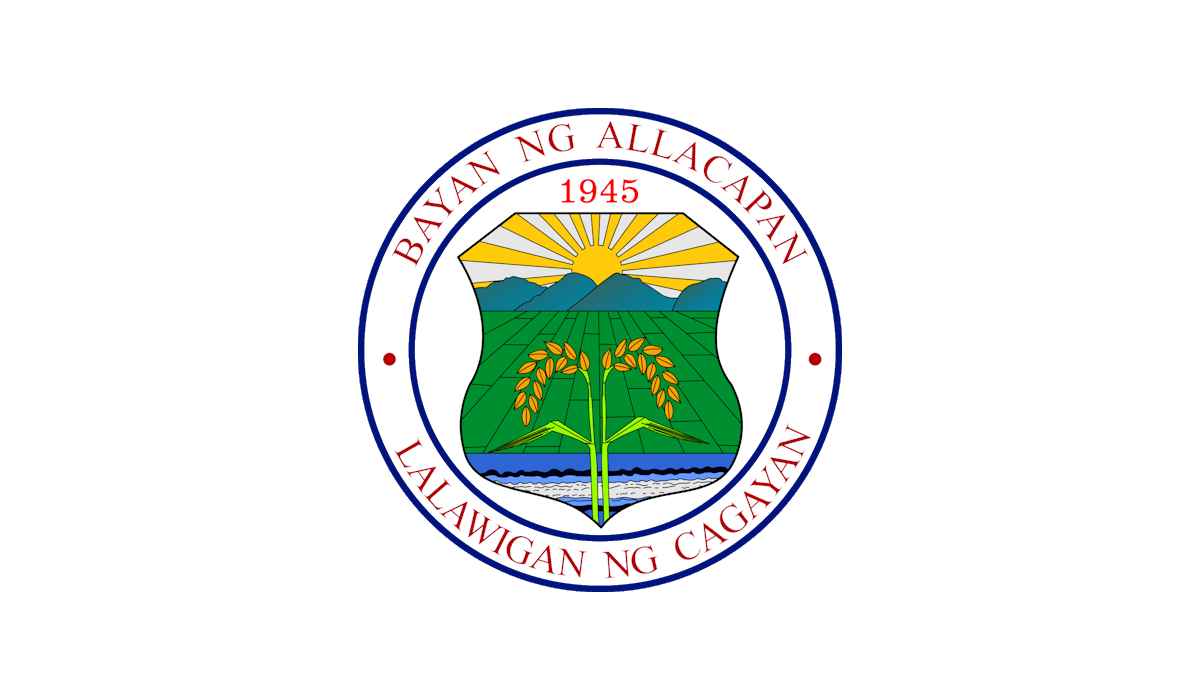
- Flag Seal

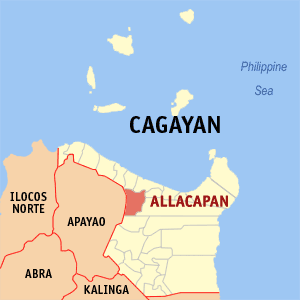
- Interactive map of Allacapan
- Location within Philippines
- Coordinates: 18°13′37″N 121°33′20″E
- Country: Philippines
- Region: Cagayan Valley
- Province: Cagayan
- District: 2nd district
- Barangays: 27 (see Barangays)

Government
  - Type: Sangguniang Bayan
  - Mayor: Yvonne Florida
  - Vice Mayor: Jay-Ar Florida
  - Representative: Samantha Louise V. Alfonso
  - Electorate: 22,193 voters (2025)

Area
  - Total: 306.80 km^{2} (118.46 sq mi)
- Elevation: 30 m (98 ft)
- Highest elevation: 135 m (443 ft)
- Lowest elevation: 1 m (3.3 ft)

Population (2024 census)
  - Total: 35,946
  - Density: 117.16/km^{2} (303.45/sq mi)
  - Households: 8,389

Economy
  - Income class: 1st municipal income class
  - Poverty incidence: 10.65% (2023)
  - Revenue: ₱ 232.5 million (2024)
  - Assets: ₱ 708.2 million (2024)
  - Expenditure: ₱ 229.8 million (2024)
  - Liabilities: ₱ 132.3 million (2024)

Service provider
  - Electricity: Cagayan 2 Electric Cooperative (CAGELCO 2)
- Time zone: UTC+8 (PST)
- ZIP code: 3523
- PSGC: 0201503000
- IDD : area code: +63 (0)78
- Native languages: Ilocano; Ibanag; Tagalog

Allacapan, officially the Municipality of Allacapan (Ibanag: Ili nat Allacapan; Ilocano: Ili ti Allacapan; Filipino: Bayan ng Allacapan), is a municipality in the province of Cagayan, Philippines. According to the 2024 census, it has a population of 35,946 people.

== Etymology ==
It is said that the municipality's name came to be when Francisco Umengan, an ex-municipal president from Aparri, was annoyed by the skittering of dried leaves heaped within the vicinity. On his inquiry about the significance of the noise, his Negrito guide told him "alla-appan" meaning "trap." Umengan then named the place "Allacapan" and the name has remained to the present.

== History ==
Allacapan has its beginning as a small village in the jungle, inhabited by Negritoes, also known as Aetas. Ilocanos mainly from Ilocos Sur, among them future mayor Santos Martinez, discovered it in their quest for better land and eventually dominated the area.

In 1926, Allacapan was founded as a municipal district of Tauit, sub-province of Apayao, Mountain Province. On June 30, 1927, acting Governor General Eugene A. Gilmore issued Executive Order No. 68, separating Allacapan from Tauit and organizing it into an independent municipal district under the same name, effective the following day. It was ceded to Cagayan in 1928 and became a regular municipality in 1945 by virtue of Commonwealth Act No. 590 authored by Rep. Miguel Pio.

During the Japanese occupation, the Japanese forces established a garrison in the town which was the site of abuses against prisoners of war and civilians. Later on, the Japanese burned the municipal hall, including the school building in the old site of Daan-Ili. The incident aggravated the fear of the residents, many of whom fled to the mountains. After liberation, disgruntled former guerrillas who were not satisfied with their backpay and aggrieved by land reform issues took to the hills with their rifles and joined the underground movement. Allacapan then became a hotbed of the Hukbalahap. This resulted in the kidnapping of then Mayor Agustin Gorospe in September 1951, the burning of the newly constructed town hall, and the looting of the local treasury.

On September 23, 2006, Mayor Nathaniel Onia was assassinated outside his residence in Barangay Centro East by two unidentified gunmen.

== Geography ==
Allacapan is situated in the north-western periphery of Cagayan, bordering Apayao.

It is located 95.32 kilometres (59.23 mi) from the provincial capital Tuguegarao, and 580.47 kilometres (360.69 mi) from the country's capital city of Manila.

=== Barangays ===
Allacapan is politically subdivided into 27 barangays. Each barangay consists of puroks while some have sitios.

- Bessang
- Binubungan
- Bulo
- Burot
- Capagaran (Brigida)
- Capalutan
- Capanickian Norte
- Capanickian Sur
- Cataratan
- Centro East (Poblacion)
- Centro West (Poblacion)
- Daan-Ili
- Dagupan
- Dalayap
- Gagaddangan
- Iringan
- Labben
- Maluyo
- Mapurao
- Matucay
- Nagattatan
- Pacac
- San Juan (Maguininango)
- Silagan
- Tamboli
- Tubel
- Utan

== Climate ==
Climate data for Allacapan, Cagayan
Month	Jan	Feb	Mar	Apr	May	Jun	Jul	Aug	Sep	Oct	Nov	Dec	Year
Mean daily maximum °C (°F)	25 (77)	26 (79)	29 (84)	31 (88)	31 (88)	31 (88)	30 (86)	30 (86)	30 (86)	28 (82)	27 (81)	25 (77)	29 (84)
Mean daily minimum °C (°F)	20 (68)	20 (68)	21 (70)	23 (73)	24 (75)	25 (77)	25 (77)	25 (77)	24 (75)	23 (73)	23 (73)	21 (70)	23 (73)
Average precipitation mm (inches)	120 (4.7)	77 (3.0)	62 (2.4)	40 (1.6)	118 (4.6)	138 (5.4)	162 (6.4)	173 (6.8)	143 (5.6)	198 (7.8)	185 (7.3)	248 (9.8)	1,664 (65.4)
Average rainy days	16.9	12.2	11.5	10.6	18.7	20.1	21.2	23.3	20.8	16.9	16.5	20.0	208.7
Source: Meteoblue

== Demographics ==
Population census of Allacapan

Year	Pop.	±% p.a.
1939	3,342	—
1948	4,638	+3.71%
1960	7,112	+3.63%
1970	12,946	+6.17%
1975	15,752	+4.01%
1980	19,273	+4.12%
1990	21,916	+1.29%

Year	Pop.	±% p.a.
1995	23,997	+1.71%
2000	26,960	+2.53%
2007	29,821	+1.40%
2010	31,662	+2.20%
2015	33,571	+1.12%
2020	35,234	+1.02%
2024	35,946	+0.48%

Source: Philippine Statistics Authority

In the 2024 census, the population of Allacapan was 35,946 people, with a density of 120 inhabitants per square kilometre or 310 inhabitants per square mile.

== Economy ==
Poverty incidence of Allacapan (%)

Source: Philippine Statistics Authority

Allacapan is the headquarters of GV Florida Transport, a major bus company in northern Luzon.

Electricity in the municipality is supplied by Cagayan II Electric Cooperative (CAGELCO 2).

== Government ==
=== Local government ===
Allacapan is part of the second legislative district of the province of Cagayan. It is governed by a mayor, designated as its local chief executive, and by a municipal council as its legislative body in accordance with the Local Government Code. The mayor, vice mayor, and the councilors are elected directly by the people through an election which is being held every three years.

=== Elected officials ===
Members of the Municipal Council (2025–2028)
Position	Name
Congressman	Baby Aline Vargas-Alfonso
Mayor	Yvonne Kathrina S. Florida
Vice-Mayor	Jayr D. Florida
Councilors	Patricio T. Tenedor
Councilors	Hirorichie F. Tamayo
Councilors	Jake Van Collado
Councilors	Mark Owen O. Saldivar
Councilors	Mark Anthony I. Donato
Councilors	Arnolfo D. Espanol
Councilors	Jaylord S. Osillos
Councilors	Angelika D. Lappay

== Education ==
The Schools Division of Cagayan governs the town's public education system. The division office is a field office of the DepEd in Cagayan Valley region. The Allacapan Schools District Office governs the public and private elementary and high schools throughout the municipality.

=== Primary and elementary schools ===
- Allacapan Central School
- Allacapan Methodist Christian School
- Bulo Elementary School
- Cataratan SDA Multigrade School
- Daan-ili Elementary School
- Dalayap Elementary School
- Kapanickian Norte Elementary School
- Matucay Elementary School
- Our Lady of Fatima Learning Center
- Pacac Elementary School
- San Juan Elementary School
- Silagan Elementary School
- Tamboli Elementary School
- Tubel Elementary School

=== Secondary schools ===
- Allacapan Institute
- Allacapan Vocational High School
- Cataratan Integrated School
- Matucay National High School
