= Lasam =

Municipality in Cagayan, Philippines

Lasam Macatabang
- Municipality
- Municipality of Lasam
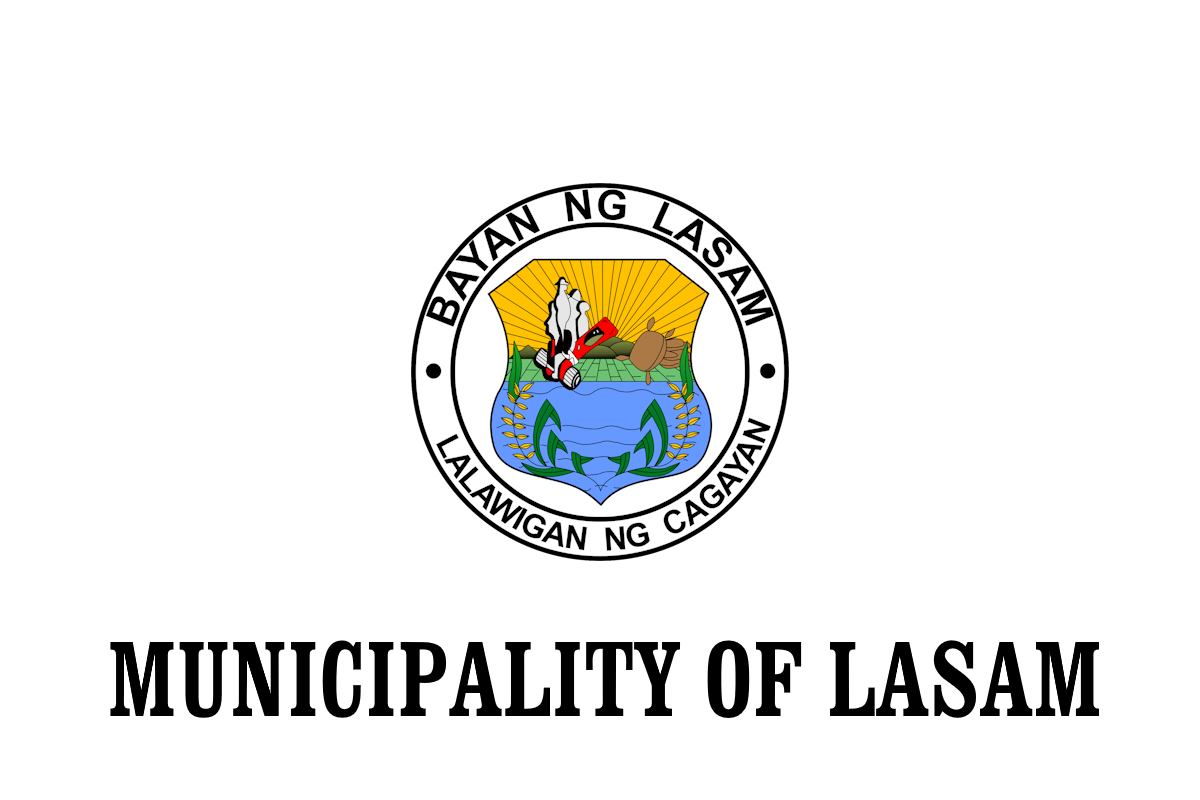
- Flag Seal
- Nickname: Rice bowl of Western Cagayan
- Motto: "Natalged a Lasam"
- Anthem: "O ili mi a Lasam"
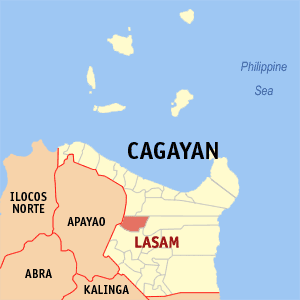
- Map of Cagayan with Lasam highlighted
- Interactive map of Lasam
- Location within the Philippines
- Coordinates: 18°04′N 121°36′E
- Country: Philippines
- Region: Cagayan Valley
- Province: Cagayan
- District: 2nd district
- Founded: June 13, 1950
- Barangays: 30 (see Barangays)

Government
  - Type: Sangguniang Bayan
  - Mayor: Dante Dexter A. Agatep Jr.
  - Vice Mayor: Dannah Paula T. Agatep
  - Representative: Baby Aline Vargas-Alfonso
  - Electorate: 25,884 voters (2025)

Area
  - Total: 213.70 km^{2} (82.51 sq mi)
- Elevation: 24 m (79 ft)
- Highest elevation: 179 m (587 ft)
- Lowest elevation: 1 m (3.3 ft)

Population (2024 census)
  - Total: 42,042
  - Density: 196.73/km^{2} (509.54/sq mi)
  - Households: 9,890

Economy
  - Income class: 1st municipal income class
  - Poverty incidence: 10.54% (2023)
  - Revenue: ₱ 225.5 million (2024)
  - Assets: ₱ 718.1 million (2024)
  - Expenditure: ₱ 210.2 million (2024)
  - Liabilities: ₱ 123.3 million (2024)

Service provider
  - Electricity: Cagayan 2 Electric Cooperative (CAGELCO 2)
- Time zone: UTC+8 (PST)
- ZIP code: 3524
- PSGC: 0201517000
- IDD : area code: +63 (0)78
- Native languages: Ibanag; Ilocano; Tagalog
- Website: lasam.sphosting.com

Lasam, officially the Municipality of Lasam (Ibanag: Ili nat Lasam; Ilocano: Ili ti Lasam; Tagalog: Bayan ng Lasam), is a 1st class municipality in the province of Cagayan, Philippines. According to the 2024 census, it has a population of 42,042 people.

The town was once a part of the Municipality of Gattaran, that stretches the width of the province and bisected by the Cagayan River. The barangays west of the river was established as the separate town of Lasam in 1950 by Republic Act No. 507. The new municipality of Lasam became part of the Second Legislative District of the Province of Cagayan.

== Etymology ==
The Municipality of Lasam was named in honor of Honorio Lasam, a former governor of the province of Cagayan.

== History ==
Lasam was once a part of Gattaran separated from the mother town by the wide Cagayan River with no bridges connecting the communities. As the population increased, the residents of the western part of the town asked to be amalgamated as a separate municipality.

The town was established on June 13, 1950, by Republic Act No. 507 and signed by President Elpidio Quirino. Barrios (barangays) of Gattaran located west of the Cagayan River were formed into the new and regular Municipality of Lasam, with the old site of the Barrio Macatabang as the seat of the government.

The town was officially inaugurated as independent from Gattaran in January 1951. Ignacio Jurado was appointed as its first mayor.

== Geography ==
Lasam is situated 87.92 kilometres (54.63 mi) from the provincial capital Tuguegarao, and 573.07 kilometres (356.09 mi) from the country's capital city of Manila.

=== Barangays ===
Lasam is politically subdivided into 30 barangays. Each barangay consists of puroks while some have sitios.

- Aggunetan
- Alannay
- Battalan
- Cabatacan East (Duldugan)
- Cabatacan West
- Calapangan Norte
- Calapangan Sur
- Callao Norte
- Callao Sur
- Cataliganan
- Centro I (Poblacion)
- Centro II (Poblacion)
- Centro III (Poblacion)
- Finugo Norte
- Gabun
- Ignacio B. Jurado (Finugu Sur)
- Magsaysay
- Malinta
- Minanga Sur
- Minanga Norte
- Nabannagan East
- Nabannagan West
- New Orlins
- Nicolas Agatep
- Peru
- San Pedro
- Sicalao
- Tagao
- Tucalan Passing
- Viga

=== Climate ===
Climate data for Lasam, Cagayan
Month	Jan	Feb	Mar	Apr	May	Jun	Jul	Aug	Sep	Oct	Nov	Dec	Year
Mean daily maximum °C (°F)	25 (77)	27 (81)	29 (84)	32 (90)	32 (90)	31 (88)	31 (88)	31 (88)	30 (86)	29 (84)	27 (81)	25 (77)	29 (85)
Mean daily minimum °C (°F)	20 (68)	21 (70)	22 (72)	23 (73)	24 (75)	25 (77)	25 (77)	25 (77)	24 (75)	23 (73)	23 (73)	21 (70)	23 (73)
Average precipitation mm (inches)	133 (5.2)	87 (3.4)	68 (2.7)	44 (1.7)	127 (5.0)	134 (5.3)	160 (6.3)	162 (6.4)	134 (5.3)	192 (7.6)	194 (7.6)	260 (10.2)	1,695 (66.7)
Average rainy days	18.1	13.3	13.3	11.8	19.7	20.9	22.8	22.8	20.3	16.6	18.4	21.7	219.7
Source: Meteoblue

== Demographics ==
Population census of Lasam

Year	Pop.	±% p.a.
1960	14,677	—
1970	18,924	+2.57%
1975	22,137	+3.19%
1980	23,052	+0.81%
1990	27,376	+1.73%
1995	30,235	+1.88%

Year	Pop.	±% p.a.
2000	34,082	+2.60%
2007	36,646	+1.01%
2010	36,994	+0.34%
2015	39,135	+1.08%
2020	41,225	+1.10%
2024	42,042	+0.47%

Source: Philippine Statistics Authority

In the 2024 census, the population of Lasam was 42,042 people, with a density of 200 inhabitants per square kilometre or 520 inhabitants per square mile.

== Economy ==
Poverty incidence of Lasam (%)

Source: Philippine Statistics Authority

Lasam is primarily an agricultural community and its people derive their income mainly from farming and livestock raising.

== Government ==
=== Local government ===
Lasam is part of the second legislative district of the province of Cagayan. It is governed by a mayor, designated as its local chief executive, and by a municipal council as its legislative body in accordance with the Local Government Code. The mayor, vice mayor, and the municipal councilors are elected directly by the people through an election held every three years.

=== Elected officials ===
Members of the Municipal Council (2025–2028)
Position	Name
Congressman	Baby Aline Vargas-Alfonso
Mayor	Dante Dexter A. Agatep Jr.
Vice-Mayor	Dannah Paula A. Agatep
Councilors	Renato Paat Jr.
Councilors	Randy Cambe
Councilors	Reynald Viernes
Councilors	Wilson Constantino
Councilors	Felix Gerardo Jr.
Councilors	Lilibeth del Rosario
Councilors	Manuel Agatep
Councilors	Kasten Asuten
SK Federation	Jilton B. Pascual
Association of Barangay Chairmen (ABC) President	Dominador T. Cortez Jr.

== Education ==
The Schools Division of Cagayan governs the town's public education system. The division office is a field office of the DepEd in Cagayan Valley region. The Lasam Schoos District Office governs both the public and private elementary and high schools throughout the municipality.

=== Primary and elementary schools ===
- Aggunetan Elementary School
- Calapangan Elementary School
- Callao Elementary School
- Finugo Norte Elementary School
- Gabun Elementary School
- Good Samaritan Christian Academy of Lasam
- Ignacio B. Jurado Elementary School
- Lasam Central School
- Malinta Elementary School
- Minanga Norte Elementary School
- Minanga Sur Elementary School
- Nicolas Agatep Elementary School
- San Pedro Elementary School
- Tagao Elementary School

=== Secondary schools ===
- Callao National High School
- Lasam Academy
- San Lorenzo Ruiz Educational Institute
- Western Cagayan School of Arts and Trades

=== Technical and vocational school ===
- Lasam Institute of Technology

=== Higher educational institution ===
- Cagayan State University
