= Pamplona, Cagayan =

Municipality in Cagayan, Philippines

Pamplona
- Municipality
- Municipality of Pamplona
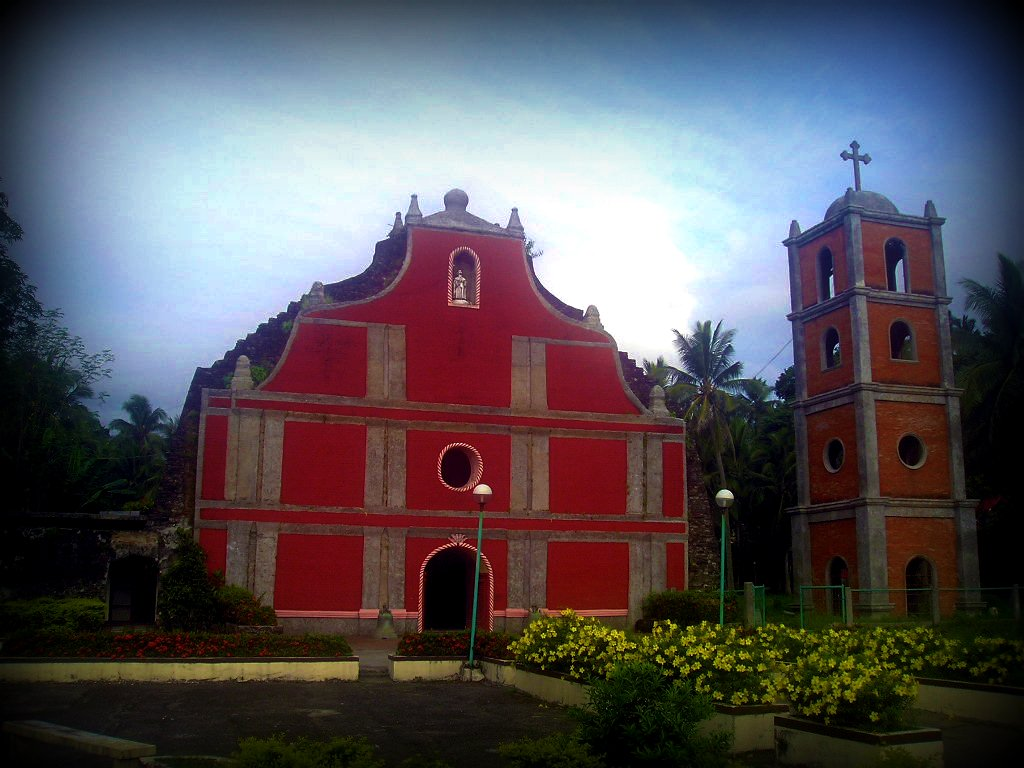
- St. Peter the Martyr Parish Church of Pamplona, Cagayan

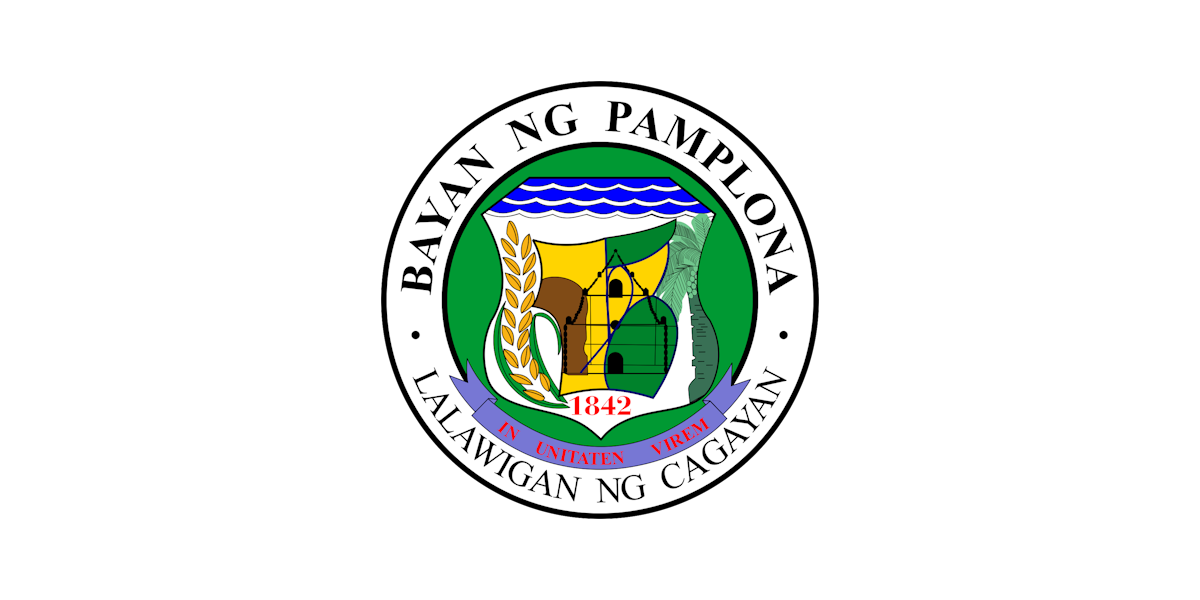
- Flag Seal

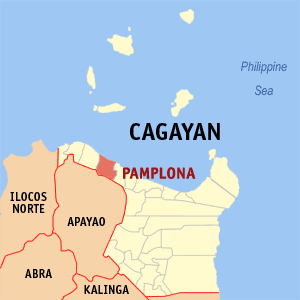
- Map of Cagayan with Pamplona highlighted
- Interactive map of Pamplona
- Location within the Philippines
- Coordinates: 18°27′58″N 121°20′33″E
- Country: Philippines
- Region: Cagayan Valley
- Province: Cagayan
- District: 2nd district
- Founded: 1842
- Named for: Pamplona, Spain
- Barangays: 18 (see Barangays)

Government
  - Type: Sangguniang Bayan
  - Mayor: Digna G. Puzon-Antonio
  - Vice Mayor: Arnie Angelica Sampaga - Fernandez
  - Representative: Baby Aline V. Alfonso
  - Electorate: 16,231 voters (2025)

Area
  - Total: 173.30 km^{2} (66.91 sq mi)
- Elevation: 50 m (160 ft)
- Highest elevation: 783 m (2,569 ft)
- Lowest elevation: 0 m (0 ft)

Population (2024 census)
  - Total: 25,182
  - Density: 145.31/km^{2} (376.35/sq mi)
  - Households: 5,850

Economy
  - Income class: 3rd municipal income class
  - Poverty incidence: 9.25% (2023)
  - Revenue: ₱ 162 million (2024)
  - Assets: ₱ 454.4 million (2024)
  - Expenditure: ₱ 151.4 million (2024)
  - Liabilities: ₱ 60.92 million (2024)

Service provider
  - Electricity: Cagayan 2 Electric Cooperative (CAGELCO 2)
- Time zone: UTC+8 (PST)
- ZIP code: 3522
- PSGC: 0201518000
- IDD : area code: +63 (0)78
- Native languages: Ilocano; Ibanag; Atta; Tagalog
- Website: www.pamplona-cagayan.gov.ph

Pamplona, officially the Municipality of Pamplona (Ibanag: Ili nat Pamplona; Ilocano: Ili ti Pamplona; Tagalog: Bayan ng Pamplona), is a municipality in the province of Cagayan, Philippines. According to the 2024 census, it has a population of 25,182 people.

== History ==
Pamplona is the result of the merging of two villages during the Spanish era - Abulacan (now barrio San Juan) and Masi. Abulacan was founded by the ecclesiastical authorities on April 30, 1757, with San Juan Nepomuceno as the patron saint. Sometime in 1842, Vicar Pedro Montenegro, O.P. convinced the people to unite the two towns. The vicar named it "Pamplona" in memory of his hometown Pamplona in Spain.

An agreement was also made that there would be two patron saints of Pamplona: San Juan Nepomuceno and San Pedro de Martir. This is the reason why the town fiesta is celebrated for two days and the images of the two patron saints are carried during religious processions. The town fiesta is celebrated every April 29.

In 1919, some of the prominent people of Pamplona recommended the transfer of the same to Bidduang, a barrio of Pamplona. The transfer was made on November 16, 1919, during the administration of municipal president Esteban Meneses by order of General Wood. In 1928, on the sixth year of the administration of municipal president Paulino Ifurung, one of his last acts was the transfer of the municipal government back to its old site, Pamplona, by then called "Albano."

Most interesting spot is the mouth of the Pamplona River. It saw history in the making for it was the starting point of Salcedo and his conquistadores when they explored Cagayan in 1572. Because of the river's strong current and unpredictable floods, Mayor Nicolas B. Aquino built in 1955 a concrete levee along Barangay Masi. He also built an irrigation system. It was the first of its kind in Cagayan.

In the late 1960s, Special Forces Regiment head Orlando Dulay allegedly ordered then-trainee Victor Corpus to assassinate mayor Anselmo Galano, but Corpus decided not to follow through with the order.

On August 5, 2016, Vice Mayor Aaron Sampaga was assassinated in his friend's compound in Barangay Masi by motorcycle-riding gunmen. Sampaga had previously served three terms as mayor of Pamplona, during which his then-vice mayor Edwin Ifurung accused him of being involved in the 2014 murder of his brother, barangay councilor Edmund Ifurung.

== Geography ==
Pamplona is situated 140.67 kilometres (87.41 mi) from the provincial capital Tuguegarao, and 647.67 kilometres (402.44 mi) from the country's capital city of Manila.

=== Barangays ===
Pamplona is politically subdivided into 18 barangays. Each barangay consists of puroks while some have sitios.

- Abbangkeruan
- Allasitan
- Bagu
- Balingit
- Bidduang
- Cabaggan
- Capalalian
- Casitan
- Centro
- Curva
- Gattu
- Masi (formerly Zimigui-Ziuanan)
- Nagattatan
- Nagtupacan
- San Juan
- Santa Cruz (Pimpila)
- Tabba
- Tupanna

=== Climate ===
Climate data for Pamplona, Cagayan
Month	Jan	Feb	Mar	Apr	May	Jun	Jul	Aug	Sep	Oct	Nov	Dec	Year
Mean daily maximum °C (°F)	25 (77)	26 (79)	29 (84)	31 (88)	31 (88)	31 (88)	30 (86)	30 (86)	30 (86)	28 (82)	27 (81)	25 (77)	29 (84)
Mean daily minimum °C (°F)	20 (68)	20 (68)	21 (70)	23 (73)	24 (75)	25 (77)	25 (77)	25 (77)	24 (75)	23 (73)	23 (73)	21 (70)	23 (73)
Average precipitation mm (inches)	120 (4.7)	77 (3.0)	62 (2.4)	40 (1.6)	118 (4.6)	138 (5.4)	162 (6.4)	173 (6.8)	143 (5.6)	198 (7.8)	185 (7.3)	248 (9.8)	1,664 (65.4)
Average rainy days	16.9	12.2	11.5	10.6	18.7	20.1	21.2	23.3	20.8	16.9	16.5	20.0	208.7
Source: Meteoblue

== Demographics ==
Population census of Pamplona
Year	Pop.	±% p.a.
1903	3,089	—
1918	3,672	+1.16%
1939	7,650	+3.56%
1948	8,029	+0.54%
1960	10,026	+1.87%
1970	13,568	+3.07%
1975	14,965	+1.98%
1980	17,603	+3.30%
1990	16,775	−0.48%
1995	18,107	+1.44%
2000	20,142	+2.31%
2007	21,889	+1.15%
2010	23,236	+2.20%
2015	23,596	+0.29%
2020	24,781	+1.04%
2024	25,182	+0.39%
Source: Philippine Statistics Authority

In the 2024 census, the population of Pamplona was 25,182 people, with a density of 150 inhabitants per square kilometre or 390 inhabitants per square mile.

== Economy ==
Poverty incidence of Pamplona (%)

Source: Philippine Statistics Authority

== Government ==
=== Local government ===
Pamplona is part of the second legislative district of the province of Cagayan. It is governed by a mayor, designated as its local chief executive, and by a municipal council as its legislative body in accordance with the Local Government Code. The mayor, vice mayor, and the municipal councilors are elected directly by the people through an election held every three years.

=== Elected officials ===
Members of the Municipal Council (2019–2022)
Position	Name
Congressman	Samantha Louise V. Alfonso
Mayor	Digna G. Puzon-Antonio
Vice-Mayor	Arnie Angelica Sampaga-Fernandez
Councilors	Ria Angela G. Sampaga
Councilors	Marlon R. Yamongan
Councilors	John Fritz Herbert S. Roque
Councilors	Alicia L. Banham
Councilors	Laurence E. Daguna
Councilors	Leticia F. Echenique
Councilors	Felix M. Zimara
Councilors	Aristotle Y. Maquiraya

=== List of mayors ===
- Nicolas B. Aquino (1955 – 1963)
- Anselmo N. Galano (1963 – 1976)
- Aldegundo B. Cayosa (1980 – 1987)
- Antonio R. Ifurung (1992 – 1998)
- Aaron Sampaga (2007 – 2016)
- Arnie Angelica Sampaga (2016 – 2019)
- Digna Puzon-Antonio (2019 – present)

== Education ==
The Schools Division of Cagayan governs the town's public education system. The division office is a field office of the DepEd in Cagayan Valley region. The Pamplona Schools District Office governs the public and private elementary and high schools throughout the municipality.

=== Primary and elementary schools ===
- Abbangkeruan Elementary School
- Allasitan Elementary School
- Bagu Elementary School
- Balingit Elementary School
- Bidduang Elementary School
- Cabaggan Elementary School
- Capalalian Elementary School
- Casitan Elementary School
- Curva Elementary School
- Masi Primary School
- Nagattatan Elementary School
- Pamplona Cenral School
- Pimpila Elementary School
- San Juan Elementary School
- Tabba Elementary School
- Tupanna Elementary School

=== Secondary schools ===
- Bidduang National High School
- David M. Puzon Memorial National High School
- Pamplona National School of Fisheries
- Pamplona Institute
