= Ballesteros, Cagayan =

Municipality in Cagayan, Philippines

Ballesteros
- Municipality
- Municipality of Ballesteros
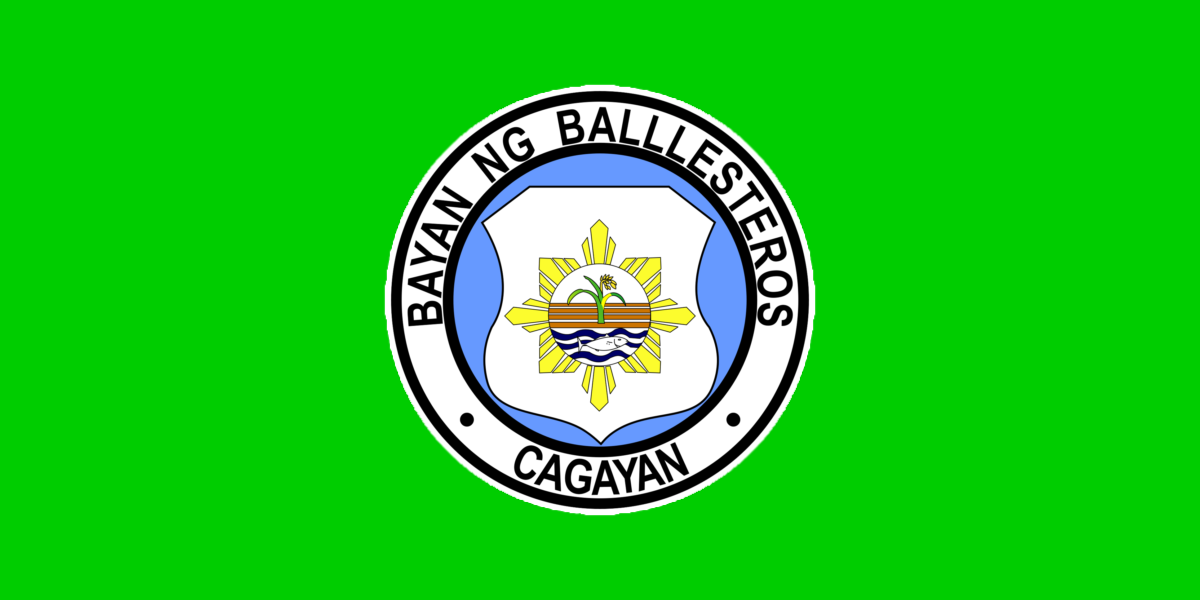
- Flag Seal
- Anthem: "Ballesteros March"
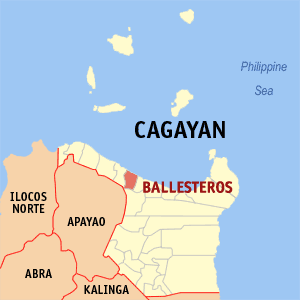
- Map of Cagayan with Ballesteros highlighted
- Interactive map of Ballesteros
- Location within the Philippines
- Coordinates: 18°24′39″N 121°31′01″E
- Country: Philippines
- Region: Cagayan Valley
- Province: Cagayan
- District: 2nd district
- Founded: December 18, 1911
- Named for: Gregorio Ballesteros
- Barangays: 19 (see Barangays)

Government
  - Type: Sangguniang Bayan
  - Mayor: Robert H. Ogalino
  - Vice Mayor: Vincent G. Unite
  - Representative: Baby Aline V. Alfonso
  - Electorate: 22,160 voters (2025)

Area
  - Total: 120.00 km^{2} (46.33 sq mi)
- Elevation: 5.0 m (16.4 ft)
- Highest elevation: 49 m (161 ft)
- Lowest elevation: 0 m (0 ft)

Population (2024 census)
  - Total: 34,562
  - Density: 288.02/km^{2} (745.96/sq mi)
  - Households: 8,765

Economy
  - Income class: 2nd municipal income class
  - Poverty incidence: 7.24% (2023)
  - Revenue: ₱ 174.1 million (2024)
  - Assets: ₱ 404.8 million (2024)
  - Expenditure: ₱ 172.5 million (2024)
  - Liabilities: ₱ 70.22 million (2024)

Service provider
  - Electricity: Cagayan 2 Electric Cooperative (CAGELCO 2)
- Time zone: UTC+8 (PST)
- ZIP code: 3516
- PSGC: 0201507000
- IDD : area code: +63 (0)78
- Native languages: Ilocano; Ibanag; Tagalog

Ballesteros (Ibanag: Ili nat Ballesteros; Ilocano: Ili ti Ballesteros; Tagalog: Bayan ng Ballesteros), officially the Municipality of Ballesteros, is a municipality in the province of Cagayan, Philippines. According to the 2024 census, it has a population of 34,562 people.

The town is generally populated by Ilocano people.

== History ==
Ballesteros was formerly a barrio of Abulug named Santa Cruz, which was made an independent municipality in 1911. It was named after Gregorio Ballesteros, a Filipino priest who spearheaded the development of the community.

== Geography ==
Ballesteros is situated 120.80 kilometres (75.06 mi) from the provincial capital Tuguegarao, and 605.95 kilometres (376.52 mi) from the country's capital city of Manila.

=== Barangays ===
Ballesteros is politically subdivided into 19 barangays. Each barangay consists of puroks while some have sitios.

- Ammubuan
- Baran
- Cabaritan East
- Cabaritan West
- Cabayu
- Cabuluan East
- Cabuluan West
- Centro East (Poblacion)
- Centro West (Poblacion)
- Fugu
- Mabuttal East
- Mabuttal West
- Nararagan
- Palloc
- Payagan East
- Payagan West
- San Juan
- Santa Cruz
- Zitanga

=== Climate ===
Climate data for Ballesteros, Cagayan
Month	Jan	Feb	Mar	Apr	May	Jun	Jul	Aug	Sep	Oct	Nov	Dec	Year
Mean daily maximum °C (°F)	25 (77)	26 (79)	29 (84)	31 (88)	31 (88)	31 (88)	30 (86)	30 (86)	30 (86)	28 (82)	27 (81)	25 (77)	29 (84)
Mean daily minimum °C (°F)	20 (68)	20 (68)	21 (70)	23 (73)	24 (75)	25 (77)	25 (77)	25 (77)	24 (75)	23 (73)	23 (73)	21 (70)	23 (73)
Average precipitation mm (inches)	120 (4.7)	77 (3.0)	62 (2.4)	40 (1.6)	118 (4.6)	138 (5.4)	162 (6.4)	173 (6.8)	143 (5.6)	198 (7.8)	185 (7.3)	248 (9.8)	1,664 (65.4)
Average rainy days	16.9	12.2	11.5	10.6	18.7	20.1	21.2	23.3	20.8	16.9	16.5	20.0	208.7
Source: Meteoblue

== Demographics ==
Population census of Ballesteros
Year	Pop.	±% p.a.
1918	7,946	—
1939	10,863	+1.50%
1948	12,285	+1.38%
1960	16,111	+2.28%
1970	19,042	+1.68%
1975	19,867	+0.85%
1980	22,254	+2.29%
1990	24,849	+1.11%
1995	25,644	+0.59%
2000	27,534	+1.54%
2007	31,044	+1.67%
2010	32,215	+1.36%
2015	34,299	+1.20%
2020	34,488	+0.12%
2024	34,562	+0.05%
Source: Philippine Statistics Authority

In the 2024 census, the population of Ballesteros was 34,562 people, with a density of 290 inhabitants per square kilometre or 750 inhabitants per square mile.

== Economy ==
Poverty incidence of Ballesteros (%)

Source: Philippine Statistics Authority

== Government ==
=== Local government ===
Ballesteros is part of the second legislative district of the province of Cagayan. It is governed by a mayor, designated as its local chief executive, and by a municipal council as its legislative body in accordance with the Local Government Code. The mayor, vice mayor, and the councilors are elected directly by the people through an election which is being held every three years.

=== Elected officials ===
Members of the Municipal Council (2019–2022)
Position	Name
Congressman	Baby Aline Vargas-Alfonso
Mayor	Vincent G. Unite
Vice-Mayor	Violeta V. Unite
Councilors	Loren O. Bonifacio
Councilors	Donald C. Sonido Sr.
Councilors	Dario D. Lacuanan
Councilors	Jane D. Chua
Councilors	Floren C. Pinzon
Councilors	Catalino B. Acosta
Councilors	Amber Joy E. Guadiz
Councilors	Albert U. Collado

== Education ==
The Schools Division of Cagayan governs the town's public education system. The division office is a field office of the DepEd in Cagayan Valley region. The Baggao Schools District Office governs both the public and private elementary and high schools throughout the municipality.

=== Primary and elementary schools ===
- Ammubuan Elementary School
- Ballesteros Central School
- Ballesteros West Central School
- Cabanabaan Elementary School
- Cabaritan East Elementary School
- Cabaritan West Elementary School
- Cabayu Elementary School
- Cabuluan Elementary School
- Calappawan Elementary School
- Caranan-Babbay Elementary School
- Fugu Elementary School
- Love Children Pre-School
- Mabuttal Elementary School
- Nararagan Elementary School
- Palloc Elementary School
- Payagan East Elementary School
- Payagan West Elementary School
- San Juan Elementary School
- Sta. Cruz Elementary School
- Sto. Niño Catholic School of Ballesteros
- Ti Naimbag A Pastor Learning Center
- Wawang Elementary School
- Zitanga Elementary School

=== Secondary schools ===
- Balleteros Adventist Multigrade School
- Ballesteros National High School

=== Higher educational institutions ===
- Northern Cagayan Colleges Foundation
- Quezon Colleges of the North
