= Florencio Vargas =

Filipino politician (1931–2010)

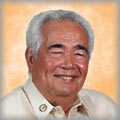

Member of the House of Representatives from Cagayan's 2nd district
- In office June 30, 2004 – July 22, 2010
- Preceded by: Celia T. Taganas-Layus
- Succeeded by: Baby Aline Vargas-Alfonso

30th Governor of Cagayan
- In office June 30, 1998 – June 30, 2001
- Vice Governor: Oscar Pagulayan
- Preceded by: Rodolfo Aguinaldo
- Succeeded by: Edgar Lara

Personal details
- Born: November 7, 1931 Cagayan, Philippine Islands
- Died: July 22, 2010 (aged 78) Quezon City, Philippines
- Cause of death: Leukemia
- Party: Lakas–CMD/Lakas–Kampi–CMD (2007–2010)
- Other political affiliations: Liberal (until 2007)
- Spouse: Iluminada P. Vargas
- Children: 4, including Melvin and Baby Aline
- Occupation: Politician
- Profession: Businessman

Florencio Liquigan Vargas (November 7, 1931 – July 22, 2010) was a Filipino politician. A member of the Lakas-Kampi-CMD party, he has been elected to three terms as a Member of the House of Representatives of the Philippines, representing the 2nd District of Cagayan. He first won election to Congress in 2004, and was re-elected in 2007 and 2010. He died on July 22, 2010, due to leukemia.

Prior to his service in Congress, Vargas was elected governor of Cagayan from 1998 to 2001.
