= Claveria, Cagayan =

Municipality in Cagayan, Philippines

Claveria
- Municipality
- Municipality of Claveria
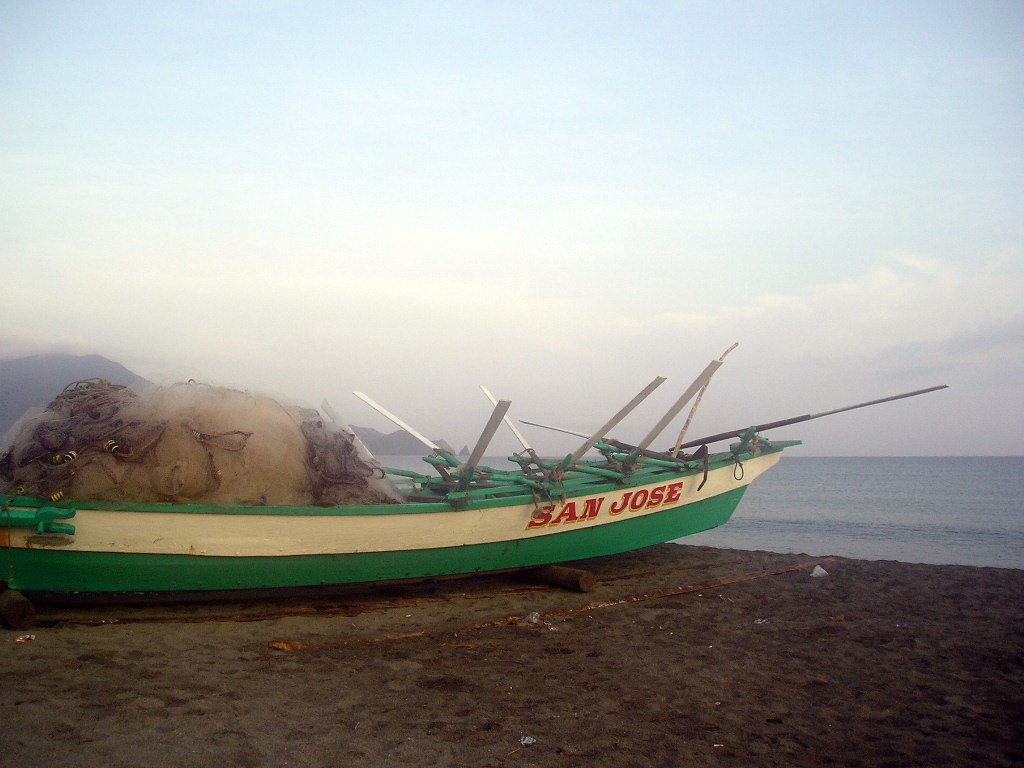
- Beach and boat in Claveria

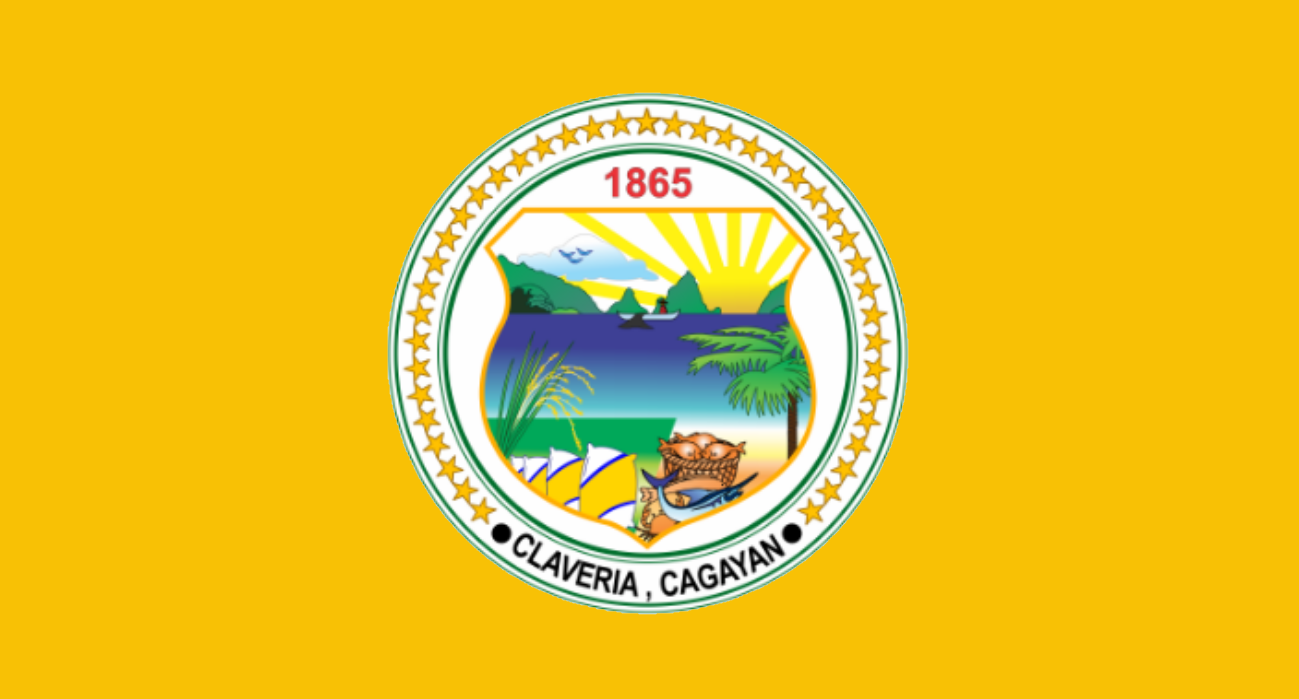
- Flag Seal

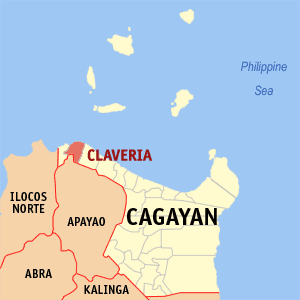
- Map of Cagayan with Claveria highlighted
- Interactive map of Claveria
- Location within the Philippines
- Coordinates: 18°36′22″N 121°04′56″E
- Country: Philippines
- Region: Cagayan Valley
- Province: Cagayan
- District: 2nd district
- Named for: Narciso Clavería y Zaldúa
- Barangays: 41 (see Barangays)

Government
  - Type: Sangguniang Bayan
  - Mayor: Lucille Angelus Guillen-Yapo
  - Vice Mayor: Fredelino D. Agpuldo
  - Representative: Baby Aline Vargas-Alfonso
  - Electorate: 22,517 voters (2025)

Area
  - Total: 194.80 km^{2} (75.21 sq mi)
- Elevation: 36 m (118 ft)
- Highest elevation: 440 m (1,440 ft)
- Lowest elevation: 0 m (0 ft)

Population (2024 census)
  - Total: 32,997
  - Density: 169.39/km^{2} (438.72/sq mi)
  - Households: 8,224

Economy
  - Income class: 2nd municipal income class
  - Poverty incidence: 5.57% (2023)
  - Revenue: ₱ 201.1 million (2024)
  - Assets: ₱ 471.3 million (2024)
  - Expenditure: ₱ 203 million (2024)
  - Liabilities: ₱ 141.7 million (2024)

Service provider
  - Electricity: Cagayan 2 Electric Cooperative (CAGELCO 2)
- Time zone: UTC+8 (PST)
- ZIP code: 3519
- PSGC: 0201511000
- IDD : area code: +63 (0)78
- Native languages: Ilocano; Ibanag; Isnag; Tagalog
- Website: www.claveriacagayannorth.gov.ph

Claveria, officially the Municipality of Claveria (Ibanag: Ili nat Claveria; Ilocano: Ili ti Claveria; Tagalog: Bayan ng Claveria), is a municipality in the province of Cagayan, Philippines. According to the 2024 census, it has a population of 32,997 people.

== History ==
Claveria was officially established as a Spanish mission called Cabicungan on 17 April 1633. It was made into a civil town on 9 March 1865. Initially named after the Cabicungan river that runs through the town, it was renamed Claveria in the 19th century after the Spanish Governor-General Narciso Clavería. In 1661, the town was attacked by rebels from the Ilocos led by Pedro Almazan, resulting in the death of the resident missionary, Jose Navarro de Santa Maria. In the 18th century, the Spanish established a military garrison in the town to launch expeditions against the unconquered Isneg tribes of Apayao and to guard the mountain route to the Ilocos.

== Geography ==
Claveria is situated 179.82 kilometres (111.73 mi) from the provincial capital Tuguegarao, and 608.78 kilometres (378.28 mi) from the country's capital city of Manila.

=== Barangays ===
Claveria is politically subdivided into 41 barangays. Each barangay consists of puroks while some have sitios.

- Alimoan
- Bacsay Cataraoan Norte
- Bacsay Cataraoan Sur
- Bacsay Mapulapula
- Bilibigao
- Buenavista
- Cadcadir East (former brgy of Santa Praxedes)
- Cadcadir West (former brgy of Santa Praxedes)
- Camalagaoan/D. Leaño
- Capannikian
- Centro I (Poblacion)
- Centro II (Poblacion)
- Centro III (Poblacion)
- Centro IV (Nangasangan)
- Centro V (Mina)
- Centro VI (Minanga)
- Centro VII (Malasin East)
- Centro VIII (Malasin West)
- Culao
- Dibalio
- Kilkiling (former brgy of Santa Praxedes)
- Lablabig (former brgy of Santa Praxedes)
- Luzon
- Mabnang (former brgy of Santa Praxedes)
- Magdalena
- Malilitao
- Nagsabaran
- Pata East
- Pata West
- Pinas
- Santiago
- San Antonio (Sayad/Bimmokel)
- San Isidro
- San Vicente
- Santa Maria
- Santo Niño (Barbarnis)
- Santo Tomas
- Tabbugan
- Taggat Norte
- Taggat Sur
- Union (former brgy of Santa Praxedes)

=== Climate ===
Climate data for Claveria, Cagayan
Month	Jan	Feb	Mar	Apr	May	Jun	Jul	Aug	Sep	Oct	Nov	Dec	Year
Mean daily maximum °C (°F)	26 (79)	28 (82)	30 (86)	32 (90)	31 (88)	31 (88)	30 (86)	30 (86)	30 (86)	29 (84)	28 (82)	26 (79)	29 (85)
Mean daily minimum °C (°F)	20 (68)	20 (68)	21 (70)	23 (73)	25 (77)	25 (77)	25 (77)	25 (77)	24 (75)	23 (73)	23 (73)	21 (70)	23 (73)
Average precipitation mm (inches)	55 (2.2)	41 (1.6)	37 (1.5)	41 (1.6)	184 (7.2)	215 (8.5)	261 (10.3)	256 (10.1)	245 (9.6)	216 (8.5)	142 (5.6)	129 (5.1)	1,822 (71.8)
Average rainy days	14.1	11.1	11.8	12.5	21.8	25.2	25.5	24.9	23.8	18.2	16.4	17.0	222.3
Source: Meteoblue (modeled/calculated data, not measured locally)

== Demographics ==
Population census of Claveria

Year	Pop.	±% p.a.
1903	5,472	—
1918	8,516	+2.99%
1939	11,989	+1.64%
1948	12,703	+0.64%
1960	17,025	+2.47%
1970	22,614	+2.88%
1975	23,126	+0.45%
1980	24,509	+1.17%

Year	Pop.	±% p.a.
1990	24,145	−0.15%
1995	25,363	+0.93%
2000	29,277	+3.12%
2007	30,275	+0.46%
2010	30,482	+0.25%
2015	29,921	−0.35%
2020	31,900	+1.36%
2024	32,997	+0.82%

Source: Philippine Statistics Authority

In the 2024 census, the population of Claveria was 32,997 people, with a density of 170 inhabitants per square kilometre or 440 inhabitants per square mile.

== Economy ==
Poverty incidence of Claveria (%)

Source: Philippine Statistics Authority

== Government ==
=== Local government ===
Claveria is part of the second legislative district of the province of Cagayan. It is governed by a mayor, designated as its local chief executive, and by a municipal council as its legislative body in accordance with the Local Government Code. The mayor, vice mayor, and the councilors are elected directly by the people through an election which is being held every three years.

=== Elected officials ===
Members of the Municipal Council (2022-2025)
Position	Name
Congressman	Baby Aline Vargas-Alfonso
Mayor	Lucille Angelus Guillen-Yapo
Vice-Mayor	Fredelino D. Agpuldo
Councilors	Joji Calasag
Councilors	Erzon Lloyd S. Cabuntasan
Councilors	Edson Paul D. Flores
Councilors	Joshua Jesus L. Salmon
Councilors	Romeo R. Rafol
Councilors	Peter Shelaingenden A. Agbayani
Councilors	Melody Antonieta Blanca C. Mabanag
Councilors	Conrado C. Pascua

== Education ==
The Schools Division of Cagayan governs the town's public education system. The division office is a field office of the DepEd in Cagayan Valley region. The Claveria East District Office governs the public and private elementary and high schools throughout the municipality.

=== Primary and elementary schools ===
- Alimoan Elementary School
- Bacsay Elementary School
- Bilibigao Elementary School
- Bright Kids Learning Center
- Buenavista-San Isidro Elementary School
- Capannikian Elementary School
- Claveria Central School
- Claveria East Central School
- Culao Elementary School
- Dibalio Elementary School
- Luzon Elementary School
- Magdalena Elementary School
- Malasin Elementary School
- Malilitao Elementary School
- Mapulapula Elementary School
- Nagsabaran Elementary School
- Pata Elementary School
- Pinas Elementary School
- San Vicente Primary School
- Santiago Elementary School
- Sta. Maria Primary School
- Sto. Tomas Primary School

=== Secondary schools ===
- Academy of Saint Joseph
- Claveria National High School
- Claveria Rural and Vocational School
- Claveria School of Arts and Trades

== Notable personalities ==
- Arthur Tugade - a businessman and lawyer
- Lincoln Cortez Velasquez - YouTuber and entertainer known as Cong TV
