= Baby Alfonso =

Filipina politician

Baby Aline Vargas-Alfonso
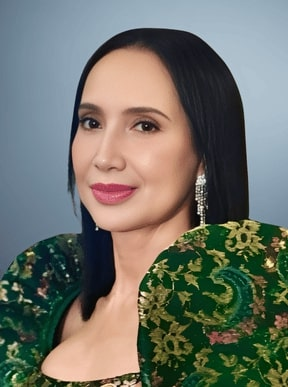
- Official portrait, 2025

Member of the House of Representatives from Cagayan's 2nd district
- Incumbent
- Assumed office June 30, 2022
- Preceded by: Samantha Vargas-Alfonso
- In office March 16, 2011 – June 30, 2019
- Preceded by: Florencio Vargas
- Succeeded by: Samantha Vargas-Alfonso

Vice Mayor of Abulug
- In office June 30, 2007 – June 30, 2010
- Succeeded by: Precy Perez Vargas

Personal details
- Born: Baby Aline Vargas; December 5, 1962 (age 63) Abulug, Cagayan, Philippines
- Party: PFP (2026–present)
- Other political affiliations: Lakas–CMD (2008–2012; 2021–2026); NUP (2012–2021); KAMPI (2007–2008)
- Children: Samantha Vargas Alfonso
- Parent: Florencio Vargas
- Occupation: Politician
- Nickname: Aline

Baby Aline Vargas-Alfonso (born December 5, 1962) in Abulug, Cagayan) is a Filipina politician who currently serves as the representative of Cagayan's 2nd District since 2022 and previously from 2011 to 2019. She is the youngest daughter of former Congressman and Governor Florencio Vargas. Vargas-Alfonso served as Vice Mayor of Abulug from 2007 to 2010.

== Early political career ==
=== First term (2011-2013) ===
After her father died on July 22, 2010, she ran for Congress in a special election in 2011 to finish his term under the Lakas–CMD party. She won against Liberal Party candidate Edgar Lara. During her term, she created House Bill 5451 which was aimed to develop a port in Cagayan. It was accepted by the congress on August 6, 2012, and was eventually referred to the Department of Finance by the senate. In Congress, Vargas-Alfonso was accused of being one of sources of fake SARO (Special Allotment Release Order) forms.

=== Second and third term (2013-2019) ===
According to Rappler, she lost her re-election in the 2013 Philippine House of Representatives elections. According to the Manila Standard, she won. In the 2016 Philippine House of Representatives elections, she ran under the National Unity Party. She won with 87,604 votes, beating Darwin Sacramed of the Liberal Party.

== Further political career ==
=== 2019 elections ===
In 2019, Vargas-Alfonso finished her three consecutive terms as Congresswoman from Cagayan's Second District. Alfonso didn't run in the 2019 Philippine general election. Her daughter Sam Vargas Alfonso succeeded her in 2019.

=== Third and fourth term (2022-present) ===
In the 2022 Philippine House of Representatives elections, she ran for the second district of Cagayan under Lakas-CMD. She won by a landslide with 123,428 votes, 89.63 percent of the votes. She beat two other candidates. In 2024, Vargas-Alfonso filed her candidacy to run for governor of Cagayan in the 2025 Philippine general election but subsequently withdrew and ran instead for another term in Congress. She ran under Lakas-CMD. She gained 100,692 votes, 12.81 percent of the votes. She beat two other candidates.

House of Representatives of the Philippines
| Preceded by Florencio Vargas | Representative, 2nd District of Cagayan; 2011–2019 | Succeeded by Samantha Vargas-Alfonso |
| Preceded by Samantha Vargas-Alfonso | Representative, 2nd District of Cagayan; 2022–present | Incumbent |
