= Our Lady of Piat =

16th-century Philippine Marian Image

Our Lady of Visitation of Piat Nuestra Señora de Visitacion de Piat
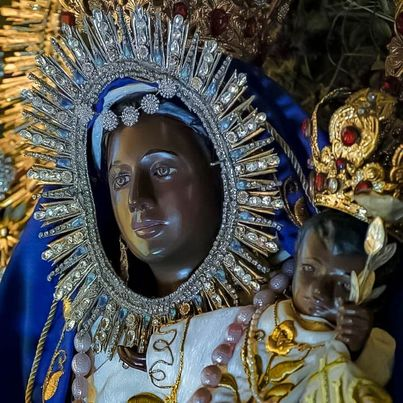
- Image of Our Lady of Piat

Our Lady of the Most Holy Rosary of Piat Apo Baket Yena Tam Ngamin
- Venerated in: Roman Catholic Church
- Major shrine: Basilica of Our Lady of Piat, Piat, Cagayan, Philippines
- Feast: July 2
- Attributes: Dark complexion, the Child Jesus, rosary, Crown, Flowers
- Patronage: Piat, Cagayan Valley, the Itawes, Ibanag, and Ilocano peoples

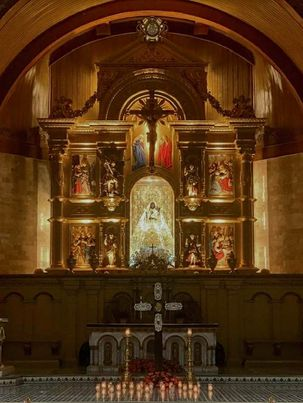
The Altar and Retablo of Our Lady of Piat

Our Lady of Piat (Spanish: Nuestra Señora de Piat or Nuestra Señora del Santísimo Rosario de la Visitación de Piat) is a 16th-century Roman Catholic title of the Blessed Virgin Mary associated with a Marian icon enshrined in a minor basilica situated in Piat, Cagayan, Philippines. It is the town's and the province's patroness and is one of the most venerated Marian images of Mary in the Philippines, referred to as the "Mother of Cagayan".

The image, one of the oldest in the country, is credited with many miracles including the end of a drought that threatened famine in the Itawes homeland of the Cagayan Valley where the shrine is located. Piat is dubbed as the Pilgrimage Center of Cagayan Valley because of the thousands of devotees and tourists who flock to the image.

== Names ==
The Virgin Mary was originally given the name Nuestra Señora del Santísimo Rosario (Our Lady of the Most Holy Rosary) by the Order of Preachers or Dominicans. The Ibanag today call her Yena Tam Ngamin ("Mother of Us All"), while to Ilocano-speaking natives of Piat she is known as Apo Baket ("Venerable Matriarch") – a title also used for several other titles of the Virgin enshrined throughout northern Luzon.

The image is also called the "Black Virgin Mary", as its skin colour is dark brown (muy morena)—which is cited as an appealing characteristic of the Blessed Virgin.

== History ==
The recorded provenance of the image of Our Lady of Piat began in Macau, from where it was brought to Manila in 1604. Its first home was the convent of Old Santo Domingo Church in Intramuros. From Manila she was taken to Nueva Segovia (now Lal-lo) to aid in the evangelization of the Itawes homeland, covering the towns of Tabang, Malaweg, Tuau (now Tuao) and Piat, where it stayed for five years. No precise description of the image is given by its historians, though it is often noted that is "of talla (sculpture)" and constructed from papier-mâché.

Eventually, the image was enshrined on a side altar in Piat. It was not long when people felt special manifestations of divine favors through the image. Their love and devotion to the Virgin had grown with the years, and attachment to her image bordered fanaticism. This was clearly seen when Fr Juan de Santa Ana sent the same image to Tuguegarao City in 1622 and ordered another one more beautiful from Manila to replace the image. The people promptly protested this, insisting that the original image be returned to them. De Santa Ana finally gave in, and the image was brought back amidst great rejoicing. There arose, however, a dispute between the peoples of Piat and Tuao as to where the image's sanctuary should be; both towns agreed to build the shrine midway between them.

On December 26, 1623, the image was solemnly translated from the Church of Santo Domingo to the new sanctuary. The following morning, a High Mass was sung and the sanctuary solemnly blessed. For the first time, care of the sanctuary was charged to Doña Ines Maquillabbun, who introduced the current custom of keeping a votive light burning perpetually before the icon.

Many years later, the people suffered great losses due to the inundations of the Chico River. Their deeply rooted devotion to Our Lady prompted them to move her sanctuary near the riverbank in the hope that she would spare them from the scourges of the yearly inundations. As a result, the people built a more spacious church of more durable materials on a hill about a mile from the parish church of Sto. Domingo. The present sanctuary was built by Rev. Fr. Diego Pinero and later restored by Fr. José Gurumeta in 1875.

Pope Pius XII granted the image a decree of canonical coronation on 12 May 1954. The image was crowned on 20 June 1954, through the Apostolic Nuncio to the Philippines Egidio Cardinal Vagnozzi.

The church was recognized as a minor basilica by the Holy See on June 22, 1999. It celebrates its feast every 2 July wherein the lady is drawn for a procession.

On June 28–30, 2011, the icon participated in the parade of 12 famous Marian icons from the northern part of the country during the “Third Marian Voyage of Peace and Love” at the Cagayan Foundation Day. The voyage was organized by the Cagayan North Convention & Visitors Bureau (CNCVB), the Archdiocese of Tuguegarao, and the Department of Tourism (DoT), with the provincial government cooperating to boost Cagayan's campaign as a pilgrimage center. On July 9, 2011, the lady was honored by a special Mass at the Sto. Domingo Church in Manila.

Centered then on the “sambali”, the Piat townsfolk celebrate the Sambali Festival from June 23 to 30. The festivity flows into the celebration of the feast day of Our Lady of Piat from July 1 to 2.

== Miracles ==
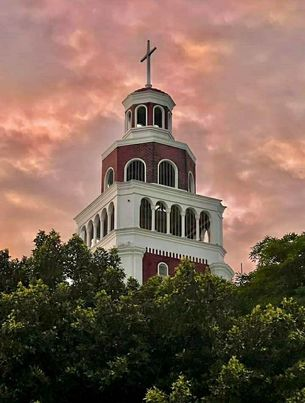
The bell tower of the basilica

In 1730, Captain José Ramos, a Spanish officer assigned in Lallo, fell seriously ill. All efforts by his physicians failed, so he went on a pilgrimage to Piat to seek Our Lady's help. He made the trip with great difficulty but, upon arriving in Piat, his illness worsened and the parish priest gave him the Last Rites. However, he did not lose hope and continued to pray to Our Lady of Piat; after a few days he slowly recovered; within a week he got well enough and went to Lallo to resume his duties.

Also attributed to the intercession of Our Lady of Piat is the miraculous recovery from serious illness of Doña Ines Maquilabbun, the icon's first appointed camarera or caretaker.

=== The ship ===
On June 2, 1738, a boat with passengers was on its way from Pamplona to Aparri. As the ship neared port, a sudden gale swept it further out to sea. With the strong winds, heavy rains and big waves, rescue seemed impossible. A passenger on a pilgrimage to Piat began to recite the rosary and exhorted his fellow passengers to join in. They all did so, and soon afterward the rain stopped, the winds died down, and the boat safely moored at Aparri.

=== The 1624 drought ===
The second miracle narrated by Father Diego Aduarte had a greater resonance. The Itawes region, an agricultural area, often experienced severe droughts. But the one of 1624 was much worse than others they had suffered as it occurred over several months. Local farmers had planted their seed several times in vain, and no crop was forthcoming.

Juan de Santa Ana and Andrés de Haro, the vicars of Piat and Tuao, respectively, were thinking of organizing some processions and rogations to implore heaven for the much-needed rain. Despite their fears that the newly-converts natives might lose their faith if the desired result were not achieved, they proceeded with the liturgies. The vicars preached fervent sermons to the people, insisting on the need to "repent from their sins and receive the Sacrament of Reconciliation," so that their prayers for rain would be heard. The people followed the priests' exhortations with great devotion, spending the whole day in the Ermita to confess their sins and sing hymns to the Virgin. The people themselves proposed a procession to the Ermita from their respective towns the following day, but even before the procession began, it began to rain profusely over Piat, and then over Tuao and their sementeras, so that "it seemed that the cataracts of heaven have been broken." The procession was held in thanksgiving to Our Lady of Piat for the rain which continued uninterrupted for three days, resulting in an abundant crop.

=== Healing of the Lunatic ===
In one of the miracles narrated by Fr. Benito Gómez, in Abulug lived a boy called Benito who fell from the roof of the parish house. The resulting damage to his brain rendered him insane. When his mother, Doña Paula, heard about this, she brought him to the shrine at Piat. There she offered some candles and alms for a Mass to be said for the boy, whereupon he became healthy and cured of his madness.

=== The Crocodile ===
A special miracle is recounted by Fr. Romano to Fr. Diego de la Torre, who added that there were many witnesses to this prodigy. During Holy Week of 1739, a native from Piat was crossing the river beside the Ermita when he was caught by a crocodile. Placed in this situation, he invoked Our Lady of Piat, and was immediately free of the animal's jaws. The poor man, shaking violently, went to the Ermita to thank Our Lady.

=== The Flood ===
This time it was a problem of too much water. The Chico river overflowed to the point that the water reached the cliff where the Ermita was built and the surrounding area, flooding the area and reaching several feet in height. Surprisingly, not a single drop of water entered the church, as if there was an invisible, mysterious wall preventing the water from going in. When, eventually, the river went back to its normal course, the Ermita was so dried, clean and tidy that no one could say any rain had fallen or flooding had occurred in the vicinity. All this happened to the great surprise of the caretaker or "ermitaño" who, afraid for his life, had climbed to the altar of Our Lady and, on his knees, prayed for his safety. He propagated the extraordinary event, and many people went to see for themselves what the "ermitaño" was telling. They could verify that it was true when they could see the marks of the height reached by the water on the walls outside but could not detect a single spot or a sign of water inside the church.

=== The Child Leper ===
The last miracle in Fr. Romano's account involves the young son of Alferez Don Pedro León y Labuag, a resident of Lallo, who was covered with a very repulsive leprosy so that he was not allowed to touch anybody for fear of contamination. The help of Our Lady of Piat was sought and, following the customary invocations and prayers, the boy was completely cured.

=== The Legasto Case ===
Arieta Legasto, a 77-year-old woman from New Manila in Quezon City, reported her healing from pleurisy through Our Lady of Piat's intercession. In 1993 she fell ill with pneumonia, developing pleurisy afterward. Her attending doctors drained some 500 centimeters of fluid from her lungs; a biopsy of lung tissue taken from her proved positive for cancer. At this time, her friend, Carmeling Crisólogo – a devotee of Our Lady of Piat – visited her and gave her a copy of the image's novena rite and a vial of blessed oil.

Crisólogo and Legasto began the novena and on the third and fourth day Legasto reported that she experienced a very strange feeling. This sensation, she said, was as though something heavy was moving from the top of her head down through her body before leaving her. Her health then gradually improved to the point that she travelled to the United States for further treatment. Before she left, she had a checkup; no pleurisy was found but the doctors found a benign tumor. She reported that she still felt some pain; despite the discomfort, she considers the pains she suffers as a blessing, an offering to our Lord in atonement for her sins.

== Shrine ==
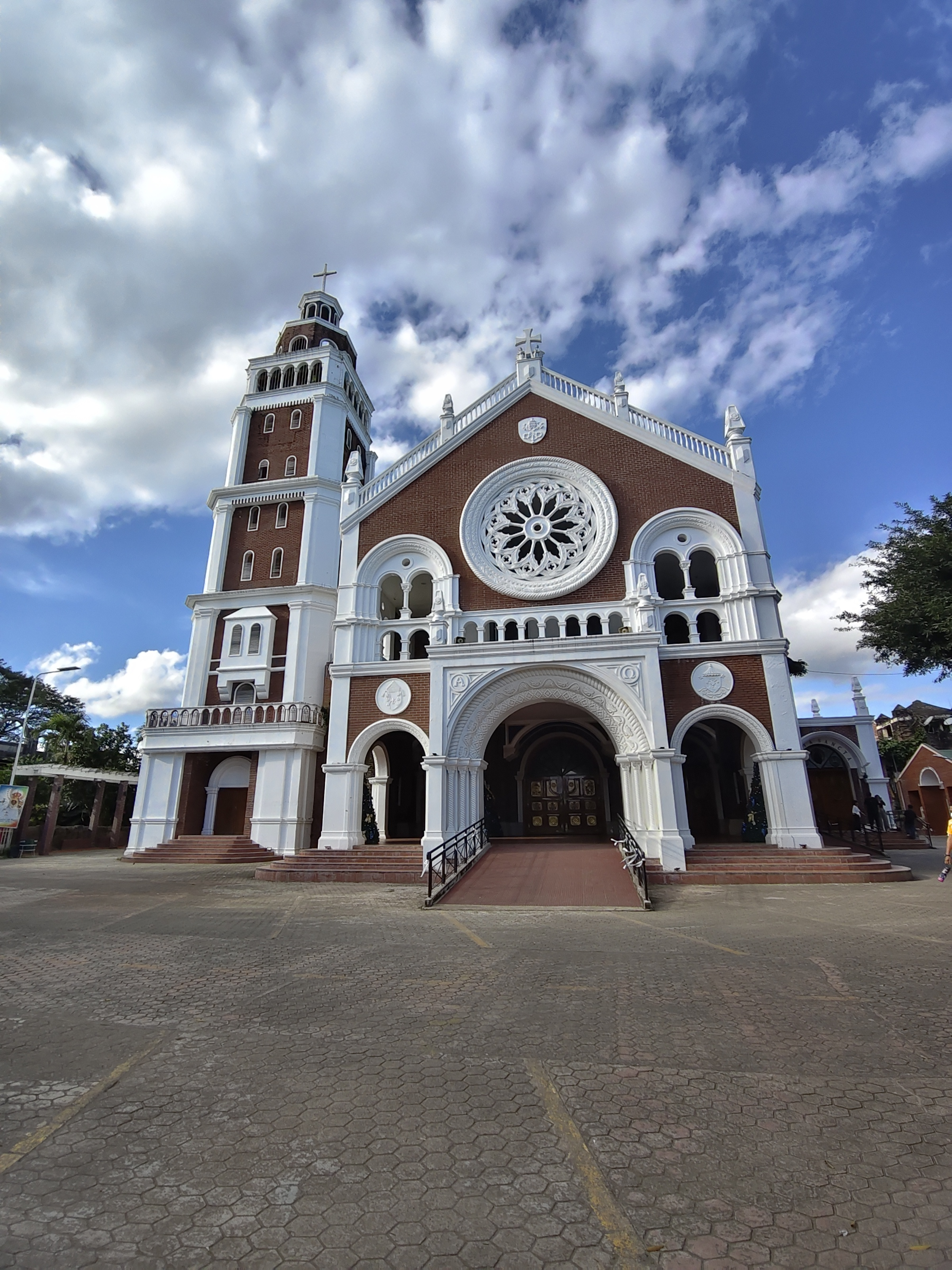
Facade of the Minor Basilica of Piat in Piat, Cagayan.

=== Minor basilica ===
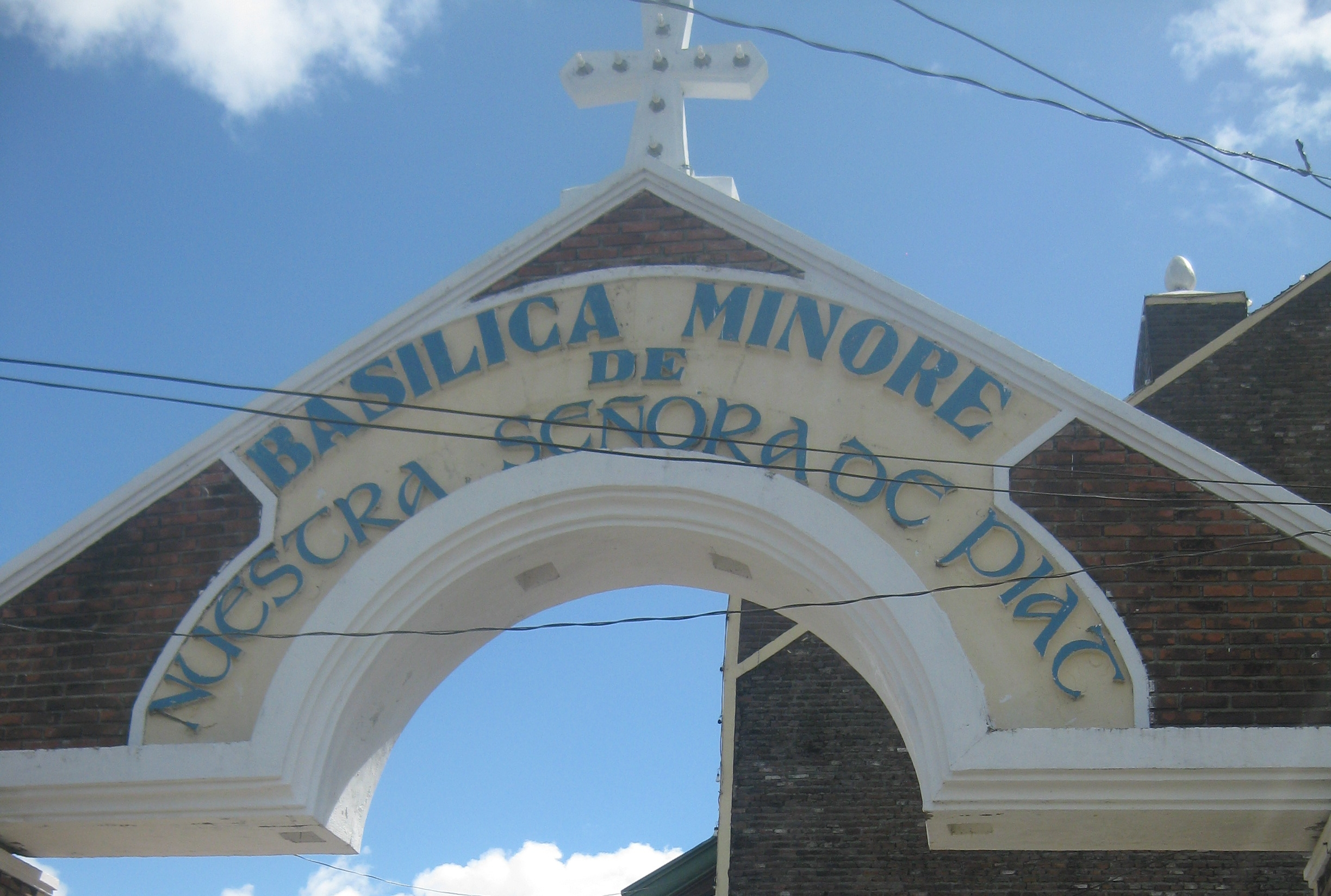
The entrance arch of the Minor Basilica of Our Lady of Piat.

The Basilica Minore of Our Lady of Piat is one of only 21 minor basilicas in the Philippines. It is distinguished as the home to the venerated Black Virgin Mary. The Basilica of Our Lady of Piat is in the town of Piat, which is 41 kilometers northwest of Tuguegarao City. This pilgrimage site attracts a large number of devotees especially on July 1 and 2 when the feast of Nuestra Señora de Piat is celebrated.

The Basilica of Our Lady of Piat have an entrance arch at the back of the church; one has to go around the church from the entrance to the facade. The arch bears the phrase, "Basilica Minore Nuestra Señora de Piat"(Minor Basilica of Our Lady of Piat), and "Dios Nikaw ti Maria" on its left pillar and "Nappanu ka ti grasya" on its right pillar which translates to "Hail Mary full of grace". Our Lady of Piat Basilica sports a simple facade flanked with a tall belfry. It is on top of a hill near the Lower Chico River with the intention of avoiding floods brought about by the seasonal overflowing of the river. The church structure is mainly made of red bricks, which is common among churches in Cagayan Valley. It is a contrast to old churches made of limestone and coral stone in many parts of the Philippines.

The interior is of curved ceiling made of wood with historical images and accounts on stained glasses above the wall. Above the main altar is the retable, in which is the icon enshrined behind protective glass. There are verandas inside the church which makes the shrine elegant. At the back of the church are staircases leading to a window exactly at the back of the Virgin Mary where devotees can pray in solitude near the image of the Madonna.

Surrounding the basilica stands the Adoration Chapel, St. Dominic de Guzman Church, Religious Goods Store and Basilica Office, the Baptistry, the Rosary Garden which contains the life-sized images of the Stations of the Cross and the images of the 12 Apostles, and an area for placing votive candles and the Church Convent.

Masses are offered every day and thousands of devotees attend every Sunday.

=== Bukál ng Buhay ===
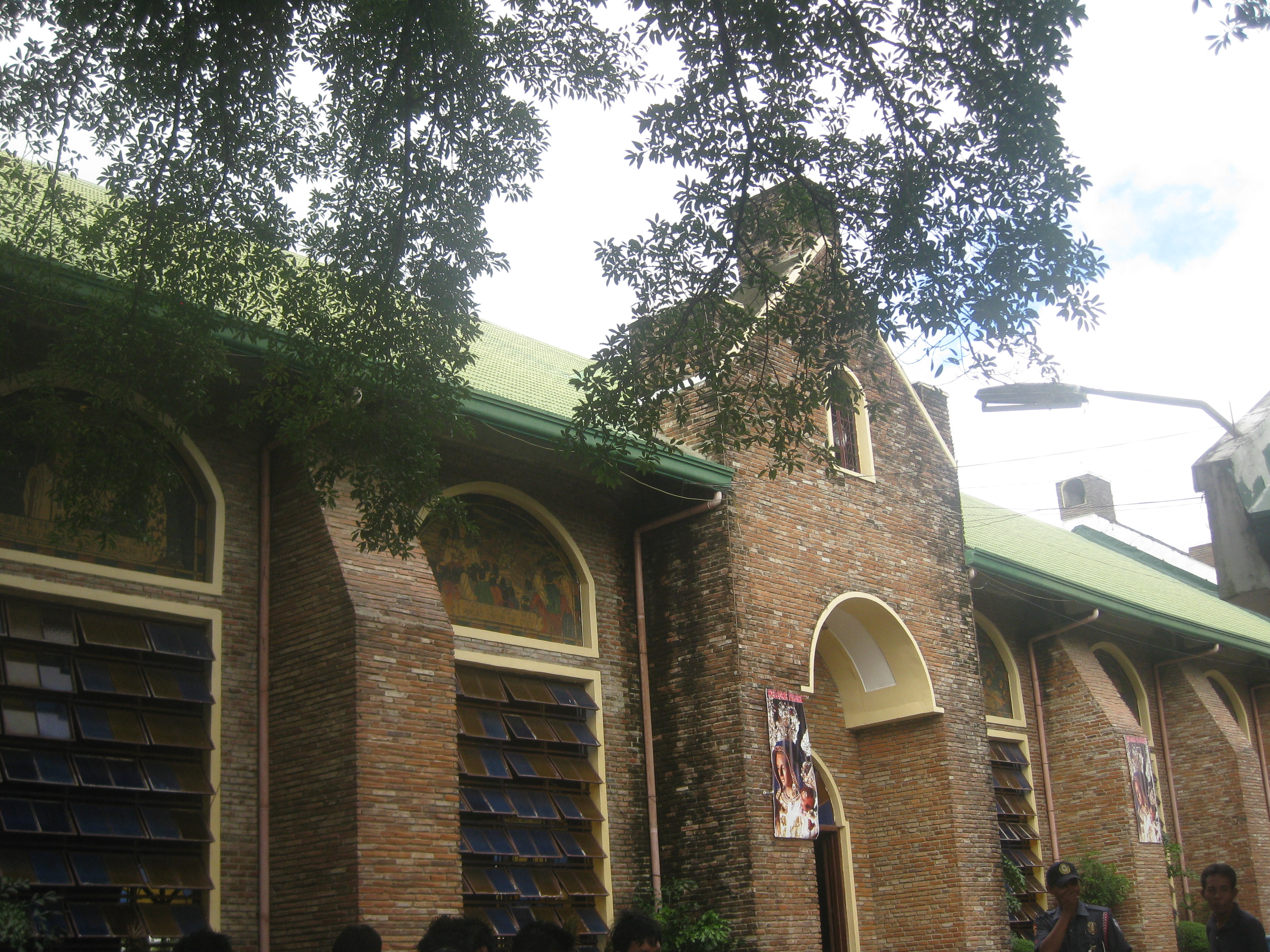
The exterior architectural design of the Basilica of Our Lady of Piat.

In April 2005, the Bukál ng Buhay ("Spring of Life") began to draw devotees after a woman dreamt of Our Lady of Piat while working abroad. In the dream, the Virgin instructed the woman to personally look for the hidden spring, which she said was near the hill in the shrine's vicinity.

The spring has since attracted interest in the medical and broadcasting fields, as devotees would report hearings and successful surgeries after drinking and washing in water from the spring.

=== Sambali Festival ===
The Sambali Festival is celebrated from June 23 to 30. The festivity flows into the actual Feast of Our Lady of Piat, which is kept on July 1 and 2. The festivity is a religious and cultural revival to commemorate the Christianization of the Itawes region of Cagayan. Activities include novenas, beauty pageant, sports tournaments, Lakbay Yaman Industry Tours, street dancing and the famous cultural presentations by indigenous groups. Thousands of pilgrims and devotees are expected to flock to the basilica to participate in the festivities and the activities lined up in the week-long event. The highlight of the festival is the fluvial procession venerating the holy image of Our Lady of Piat which starts from Aparri at the mouth of the Cagayan River to Buntun Bridge in Tuguegarao City and proceeds through a motorcade to Piat. The procession, which has become a tradition among the Cagayanons, was started by Archbishop Diosdado Talamayan.
