= Basilica of Our Lady of Piat =

Roman Catholic church in Cagayan, Philippines

Piat Basilica
- Basilica of Our Lady of Visitation in Piat; Minor Basilica of Our Lady of Piat
- Basílica Menor de Nuestra Señora de Piat (Spanish)
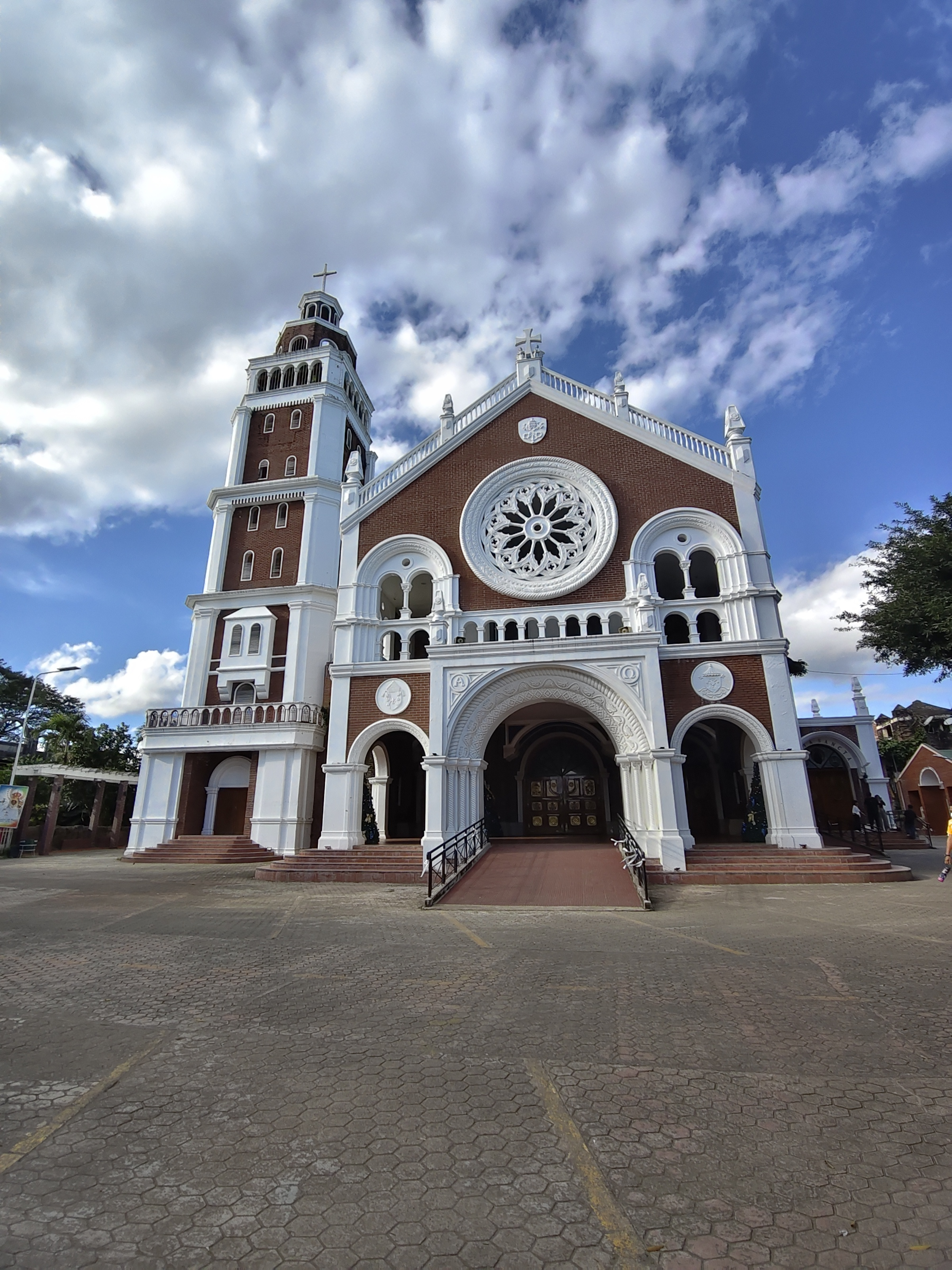
- Basilica facade in 2025

- Location in Luzon Location in the Philippines
- 17°47′13″N 121°28′48″E
- Location: Poblacion, Piat, Cagayan
- Country: Philippines
- Denomination: Roman Catholic

History
- Status: Minor basilica
- Dedication: Our Lady of Piat
- Dedicated: April 19, 2024
- Consecrated: June 22, 1999 (as a minor basilica)

Architecture
- Functional status: Active
- Heritage designation: "Shrine of the Black Virgin Mary Our Lady of Piat"
- Architectural type: Basilica
- Style: Romanesque
- Completed: 1875

Administration
- Archdiocese: Tuguegarao

The Basilica of Our Lady of Visitation in Piat is Roman Catholic basilica located in the Philippines. It is under the jurisdiction of the Archdiocese of Tuguegarao. Located at Poblacion, Piat, in the province of Cagayan, the shrine is dubbed as the "Pilgrimage Center of Northeast Luzon" and is home to the centuries-old brown Madonna Our Lady of Piat.

Pope John Paul II raised the shrine to the status of Minor Basilica via his decree Conspicuum Templum Hoc on 10 March 1997. The decree was signed and notarized by Cardinal Angelo Sodano.

== History ==
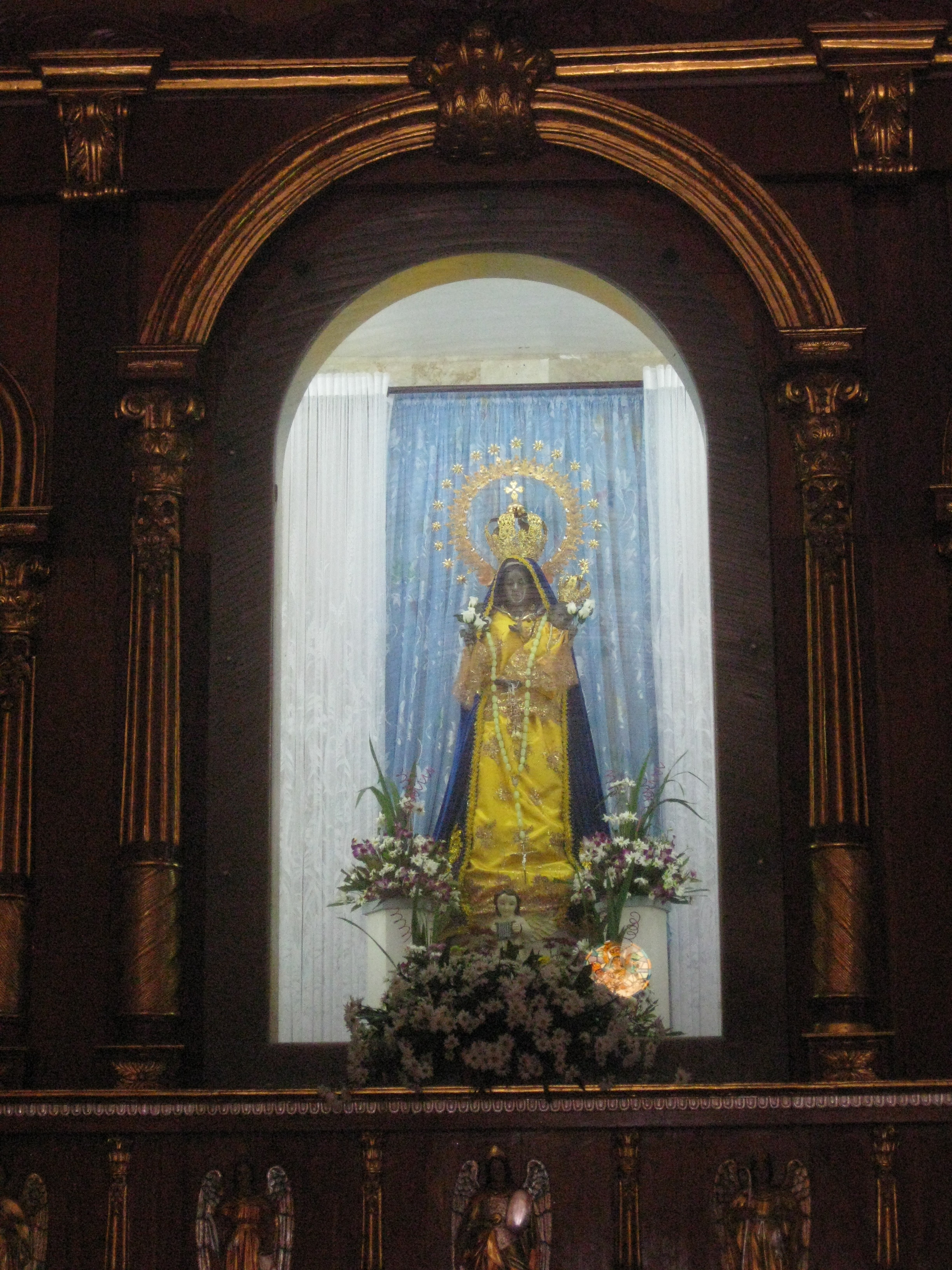
Our Lady of Piat enshrined in the high altar

The history of Our Lady of Piat dates back to 1604 when a black image of the Virgin Mary with the infant Jesus on her left arm was brought to the Philippines from Macau by the Dominican friars. It was originally called the Nuestra Señora del Santísimo Rosario (Our Lady of the Holy Rosary). A small sanctuary for the religious image was built in 1604 by the local Itawis. The image was brought to Lal-lo Church in Cagayan (then the Episcopal See of Nueva Segovia), to be known by the Cagayanos. The image was also brought to Piat, and Tuguegarao in 1622. During the visitation, it was replaced by a more beautiful image from Manila, but the people demanded that the original image be returned to them, so it was brought back to Piat and was enthroned in the small sanctuary.

During the feast of St. Stephen on December 26, 1623, the image of Our Lady was solemnly brought to the Ermita from Piat with the people following in devout procession. The people of Tuao likewise marched in procession towards the Ermita to welcome Our Lady with great rejoicing and happiness. The following day, the Ermita was blessed and a very solemn Mass was officiated by the deacon with an attendance of more than 10,000 people ("pasaban de diez mil personas") who came from all the neighboring towns. The priest noted that, it was amazing that such a large multitude would have gathered there, considering that the area was not thickly populated, and that the work of evangelization had been going on for only 25 years. The lady started the first Christians of Cagayan. According to the same historian, Fr. Aduarte, the crowd that attended the dedication of the new shrine of Our Lady of Piat was really impressive. Aduarte adds to this effect, by way of an explanation: "...So the holy Image moved the natives ('indians') to love, esteem and revere her." "An important woman from Piat ('belonging to the "principalia" or local aristocracy as indicated by the honorific title of Doña') [Doña Ines Magui'abbun] took upon herself the responsibility of looking after the Ermita" and became the first camarera (caretaker) of Our Lady. For this purpose, she decided to open up a new field (sementera) and built a house near the shrine so she and her servants could visit the sacred place often. Besides, she placed a votive lamp, that kept always burning before the venerated image and thus became the first shrine of the Lady.

In the 1700s, the people built a more spacious church of more durable materials on a hill about a mile from the parish church of Sto. Domingo. A new sanctuary was built by Rev. Fr. Diego Pinero and later restored by Fr. Jose Gurumeta in 1875. It was the first basílica menor in the region and the fourth in the Philippines. The rites were officiated by Vatican representative Antonio María Cardinal Javierre Ortas. A santacruzan was also sponsored by the Department of Tourism in celebration of the basilica. Week-long special prayers and services were also held in 29 parishes in the province, a Marian choral contest at the St. Paul University Philippines in Tuguegarao, medical mission, grand procession of all the images of patron saints and the Our Lady, and a cultural show on the documented miracles of the Virgin of Piat.

== Location ==
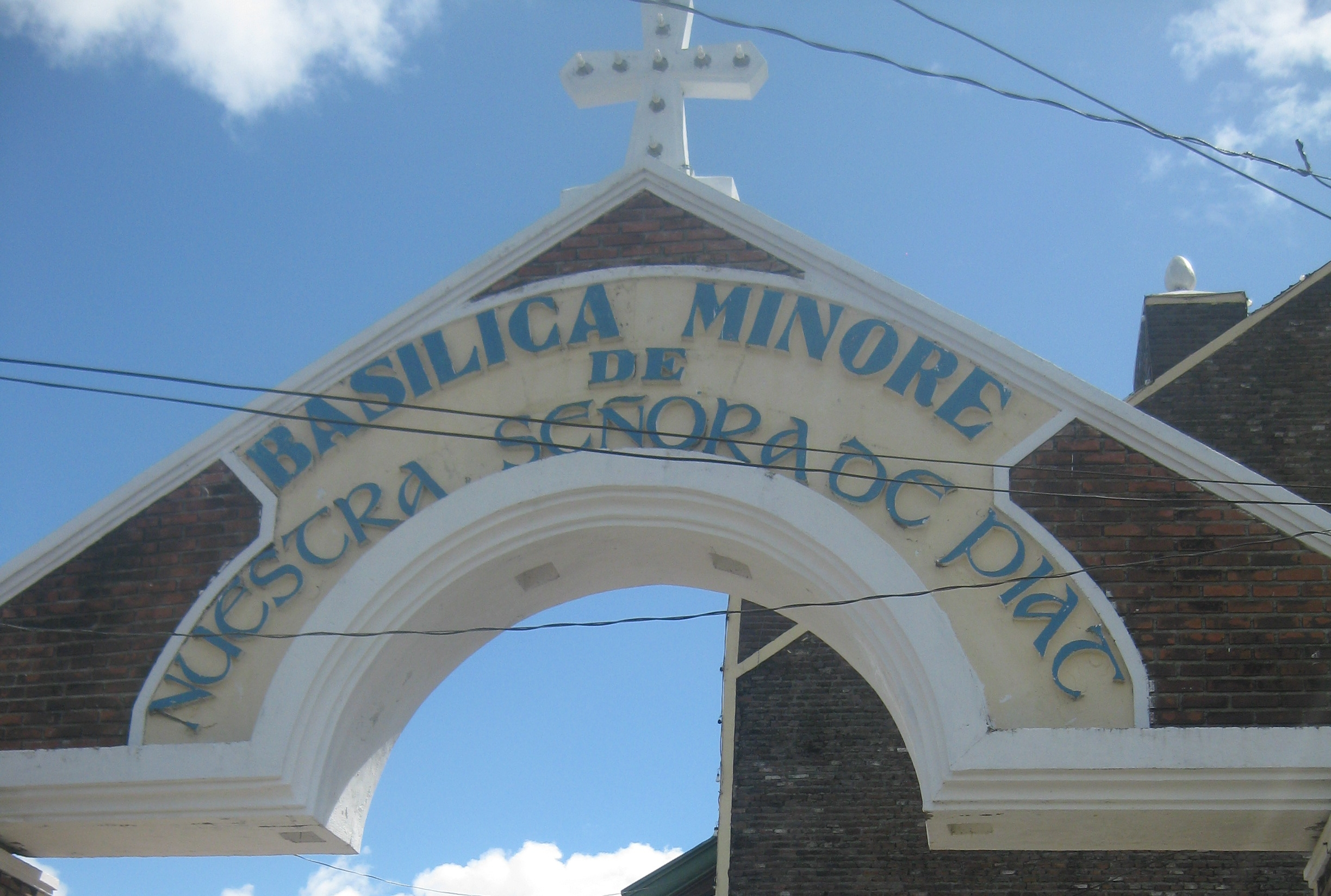
The entrance arch of the church. The engraved Spanish phrase means "Minor Basilica of Our Lady of Piat".

The Basilica of Our Lady of Piat is located in the town of Piat, 41 kilometers (25 mi) northwest of Tuguegarao City or about 30 minutes by land transportation. This pilgrimage site attracts a large number of devotees especially from June 23 to 39 when the Sambali Festival is celebrated and July 1 and 2 for the feast of Our Lady of Piat.

== Architectural design ==
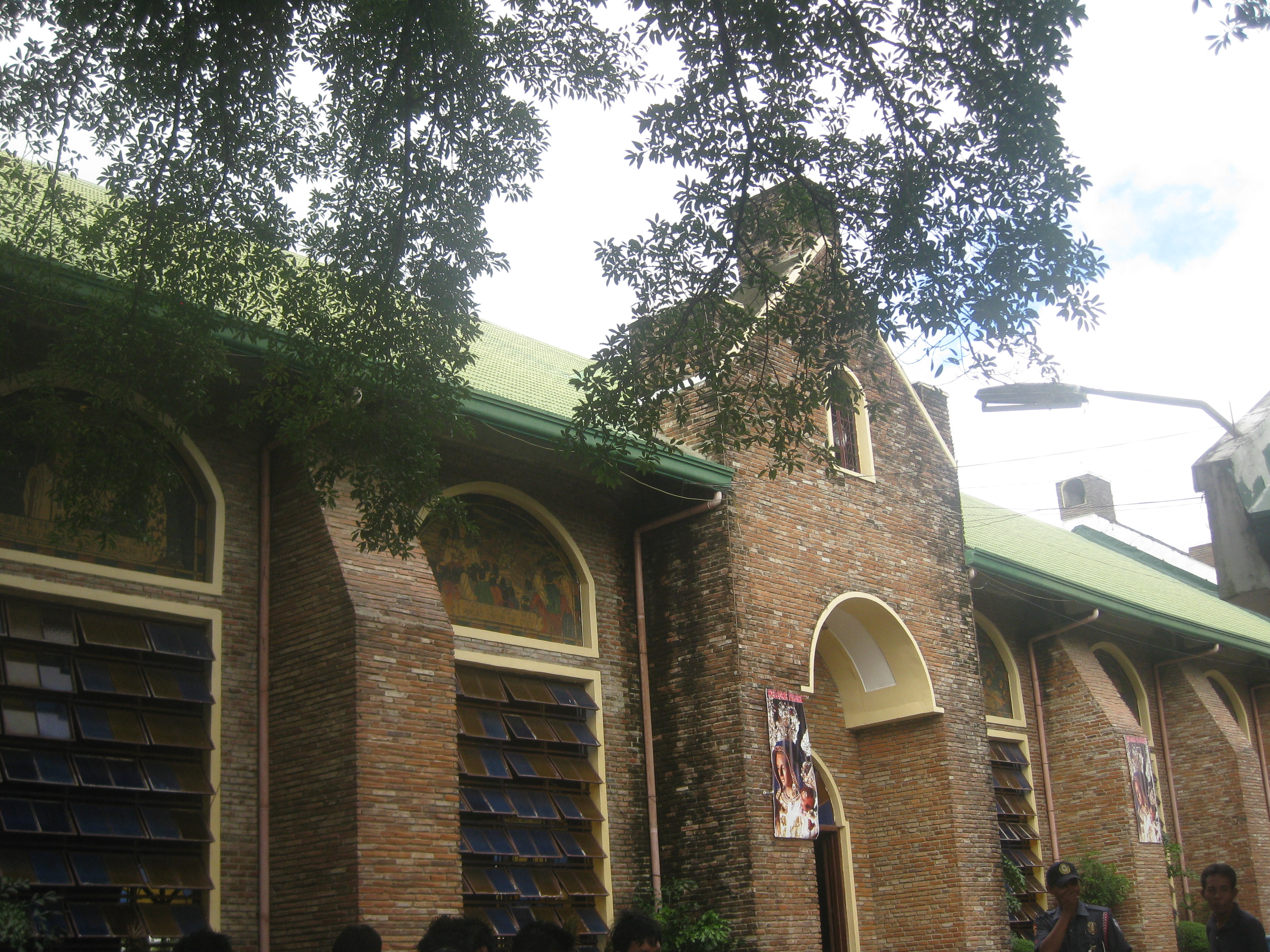
Side walls of the basilica

The Basilica of Our Lady of Piat features a unique entrance arch. It is located at the back of the church, and one has to go around from the entrance to see the church facade. On the arch is inscribed Basilica Minore Nuestra Senora De Piat (Minor Basilica of Our Lady of Piat). The basilica has a simple facade flanked to the left by a tall belfry. It is located on top of a hill to avoid flooding brought about by the seasonal overflowing of the Chico River. The church structure is mainly made of red bricks, which is noticeably common among churches in Cagayan Valley, in contrast to other old churches made of limestone and coral stone in other parts of the Philippines. The interiors have a curved ceiling made of wood with historical images and accounts at the top of the walls. Enshrined at the altar is the Blessed Virgin Mary covered in a glass case. There are also verandahs inside the church which makes the shrine elegant. At the back of the church is a staircase that leads to a window located behind the case of the Virgin Mary wherein devotees can touch the dress of Our Lady.

Adjacent to the basilica is the Piat Basilica Museum that holds several artifacts related to the Basilica or Our lady of Piat. Also surrounding the sanctuary are blessing sites for religious items, the parish convent and life-sized representations of the Stations of the Cross. Masses are offered every day, but thousands of devotees attend every Sunday.
