= Mount Annaguan =

Mountain in Cagayan, Philippines

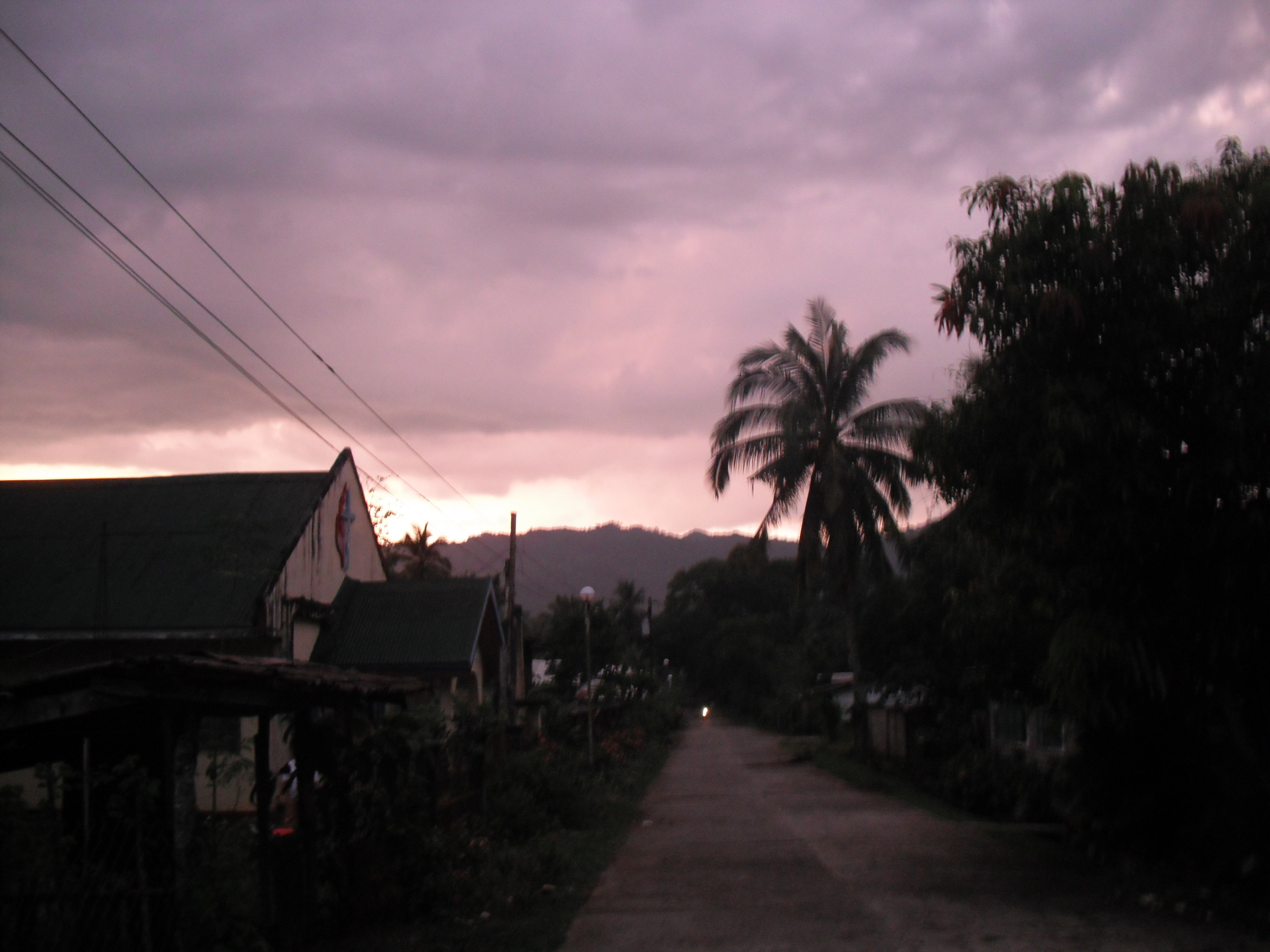
- Mount Annaguan view from the Poblacion

Highest point
- Elevation: 1,400 m (4,600 ft)
- Coordinates: 17°51′50″N 121°20′40″E

Geography
- Location within Luzon Location within Philippines
- Country: Philippines
- Region: Cagayan Valley
- Province: Cagayan
- City/municipality: Rizal
- Parent range: Cordillera Central

Climbing
- Easiest route: Rizal

Mount Annaguan (Malaueg language: Ga-dang ya Annaguan) is a mountain located in the town of Rizal in Cagayan province, Philippines. in the province of Cagayan. It has a height of 1,400 metres (4,600 ft). The mountain contains a very well preserved forest and also a cave for tourism. It also contains some rare animal species of the Philippines like the Philippine eagle. At the peak of the mountain there is also a view of the whole town of Rizal, Conner, Santo Niño and Piat. The mountain served as a hiding place for Japanese soldiers during World War II.

== Location ==
The mountain sits right beneath a barangay of Annaguan, where its name originated. It is 104 kilometres (65 mi) from Tuguegarao, Cagayan's capital city, and 594 kilometres (369 mi) from Manila. Location of the original way to the mountain is not yet defined and it will take a half day to climb from the foot to the peak.
