= Itawis language =

Austronesian language spoken in the Philippines

Itawis
- Native to: Philippines
- Region: Cagayan Valley
- Native speakers: 170,000 (2005)
- Language family: Austronesian: Malayo-Polynesian; Philippine; Northern Luzon; Cagayan Valley; Ibanagic; Itawis

Language codes
- ISO 639-3: itv
- Glottolog: itaw1240 Itawit
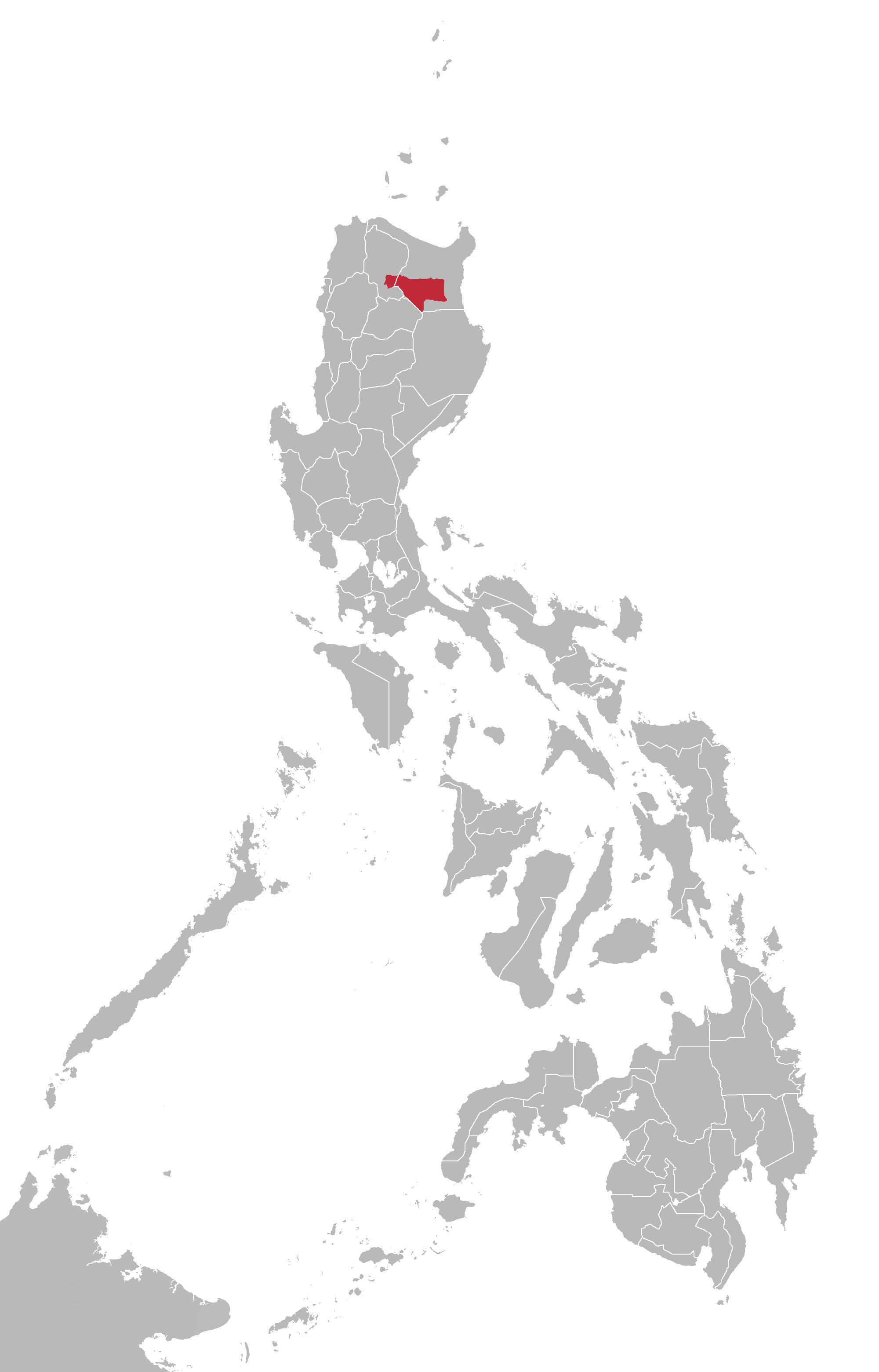
- Itawis language map according to Ethnologue maps

Itawis (also Itawit or Tawit as the endonym) is a Northern Philippine language spoken by the Itawis people, closely related to the Gaddang speech found in Isabela and Nueva Vizcaya. It also has many similarities to the neighboring Ibanag tongue, while remaining quite different from the prevalent Ilocano spoken in the region and the Tagalog-based Filipino national language.

== Background ==
Itawis is spoken by the Itawis people of Northern Luzon who inhabit the provinces of Cagayan Valley. Their range is from the lower Chico and Matalag rivers. The language is said to have rooted in the town of Tuao. In many towns by these rivers, Itawis are found with the Ibanags, and speak Ibanag as well, as an example of linguistic adaptation. Speakers of Itawis and Ibanag can easily understand each other because of the close relationship of their languages. The Itawis are linguistically and culturally very closely related to the Ibanag.

The Itawis language is classified as a Malayo-Polynesian language, a subset of the Austronesian language superfamily. During the pre-colonial period of the Philippines, words were borrowed from Spanish to stand in place for words that did not exist in the Itawis language. One such word is lamesa, which means 'table', for the Itawis people did not eat on tables, which were later introduced by the Spanish.

In the town of Rizal, Cagayan, a language called Malaueg is spoken by a group of people of the same name. It is not yet clear whether Malaueg is a distinct language or not because its proximity to Itawis may possibly make it a dialect of the latter.

=== Linguistic notes ===
Unlike most other Philippine languages, Itawit and its relatives use the consonants /z/, /f/, /v/, and /dʒ/ (spelled ⟨dy⟩). For example, fefeg ('fan'), madyan ('maid'), kazzing ('goat'), and bavi ('pig').

The Itawit language has a fast, somewhat soft tone. Speakers usually shorten sentences by shortening words; however, shortening every word is not possible. For a non-fluent, non-native, or a beginner learner, all words in a sentence should be said fully and completely. In a gesture of respect, Itawits usually use the name or status of a person at the end of a sentence.

Example: 'Where is the bathroom?' (asking an elderly woman): Dyanna yo banyu ko anti/manang?

Anti 'auntie' is used in Itawit for an elderly woman or a family friend); manang 'elder sister' is used in Itawit as a sign of respect.

The Itawit sentence structure is similar to English.

Example: 'Ifan went to get some water from the fridge.' : Y Ifan e numang nga nangalak kang danum kanne ref. : [stating word] Ifan [] went to get [word that states a place] water from fridge. The format is a noun, verb, adjective/place/noun sequence.

If the speaker is referring to a person, who they are referring to is unclear unless the specification word y is used. The Tagalog equivalent would be si, both meaning 'that person'. After y, the name of the person referred to is used, but in a gesture of respect, the status and name are given.

=== Interrogative words ===
When asking a question, Itawits usually start with a person's name or status and then the question itself. If asking someone familiar, Itawits also usually end it with he, diba, or ko (state person's name or status).

- 'What': anna (hanna in some dialects)
- 'When': sonu hanna (sometimes shortened to sonu)
- 'Where': dyanna (jan+na)
- 'Who': i-hanna
- 'Why': kaam
- 'How': kunnasi

== Classification ==
=== Dialects ===
Linguists classify Malaueg and Rizal as dialects of the Itawis language.

== Phonology ==
=== Vowels ===
Itawis Vowel Chart
	Front	Central	Back
Close	ɪ		u
Mid	ɛ		o
Open		a	

=== Consonants ===
Itawis is also one of the Philippine languages which is excluded from [ɾ]-[d] allophony, they only contrast before consonants and word-final positions; otherwise, they become allophones where [d] is only located in word-initial positions and after consonants & [ɾ] is only pronounced between vowels. In Spanish & Ilocano loanwords, [d] and [ɾ] contrast in all word positions.

The <rr> is pronounced as alveolar trill [r]. Before consonants and word-final positions, [ɾ] is in free variation with trill [r].

	Bilabial		Dental		Post- alveolar	Palatal	Velar		Glottal
Nasal		m		n				ŋ	
Stop	p	b	t	d			k	g	ʔ
Affricate					dʒ				
Fricative	f	v	s	z					h
Approximant (Lateral)						j		w	
Approximant (Lateral)				l					
Flap				ɾ					

== Examples ==
English	Itawis	Ilokano	Tagalog
How are you?	Kunnasi ka?	Kasano ka?/Kumusta ka?	Kamusta ka?
I am fine.	Napia nak.	Nasayaatak met.	Mabuti ako.
Thank you.	Mabbalat.	Agyamanak.	Salamat.
And you?	Ey ikau?	Ken sika?/Sika ngay?	At ikaw?
Good morning.	Napia nga mataruk.	Naimbag a bigat./Mayat nga agsapa.	Magandang umaga.
Good afternoon.	Napia nga giram.	Naimbag a malem.	Magandang tanghali.
Good evening/night.	Napia nga gabi.	Naimbag a rabii.	Magandang gabi.
Good evening. (for sleeping)	Napia nga akaturug.	Naimbag a panagturog.	
Good day.	Napia nga algaw	Naimbag nga aldaw	Magandang araw.
Yes	Oon; On	Wen	Oo
No	Awan; Mari	Haan / Saan; Madi	Hindi
Maybe	Nakway	Baka / Siguro / -ngata-	Baka
Definitely	Siguru	Sigurado	Sigurado
I don't know.	Marik ammu.	Diak ammu.	Hindi ko alam.
I know.	Ammuk.	Ammok.	Alam ko.
What is your name?	Anna yo ngahan mu?	Ania ti nagan mo?	Ano ang pangalan mo?
My name is ____.	Yo ngahan ku e ____.	Ti nagan ko ket _____.	Ang pangalan ko ay ____.
His/her name is ____.	Yo ngahan na e ____.	Ti nagan na ket ____.	Ang pangalan niya ay ____.
Nice to meet you.	Napia nga nakilala ta ka.	Maragsakanak a makakita kenka.	Ikinagagalak kong makilala ka.
May I ask you a favor?	Puede pe nga makifavor?	Mabalin kadi nga dumawat iti tulong mo? / Mabalin kadi nga dumawat iti pabor?	Pwede ba akong humingi ng pabor?
Take care.	Mag-ingat ka. Innam mu ikau.	Agannad ka.	Mag-ingat ka.
How old are you?	Pia ya dahun mun? Anni ya dahun mun? Pia ya dahin mu ngin? (mun is a contraction of mu ngin)	Mano ti tawen mon?	Ilang taon ka na?
I am ____ years old.	Ya dahun ku e ____.	____ anyos akon. / Agtawenak iti ____.	Ako ay ____ taong gulang.
Where are you from?	Janna yo nagafanan mu?	Taga-ano ka?	Taga-saan ka?
From what country are you from?	Anni nga bansa yo nagafanan mu?	Ania a daga ti naggapuam?	Saang bansa ka galing?
Where do you live?	Dyanna yo padayanan mu?	(Sadino ti) pagnanaedam?	Saan ka nakatira?
Where have you been?	Nagafanan mu kang? Dyanna ya nagafuanan mu?	(Sadino ti) napnapanam?	Saan ka pumunta? Saan ka nanggaling?
Where are you going?	Dyanna ya anyanan mu? Anyanan mu kang?	(Sadino ti) papanam?	Saan ka pupunta?
Can you accompany me to ____?	Puedem nga vulunan yakan kang ____?	Mabalin a kumuyogka idiay ____?	Pwede mo ba akong samahan sa ____?
Can you take me to ____?	Puedem nga iyangay yakan kang ____?	Mabalin kadi nga ipannak idiay ____?	Pwede mo ba akong dalhin sa ____?
What is your work?	Hanna yo trabahum?	Ania ti trabahom?	Ano ang trabaho mo?
What are you doing?	Hanna yo kukukuan mu?	Ania ti kukuem?	Ano ang ginagawa mo?
Where do you go to school?	Hanna yo eskuelam? Janna ya pagilamuan mu?	(Sadino ti) pageskuelaam?	Saan ka nag-aaral?
Excuse me. (asking for passage)	Pakidalan.	Makilabas ak. / Maawan dayawen. / Dispensar.	Makikiraan.
I can't speak ____ well.	Marik kuru maka-ergo kang ____ nga napia.	Diak unay makasao iti ____.	Medyo hindi ako marunong magsalita ng ____.
I can't speak ____.	Marik maka-ergo kang ____.	Diak makasao iti ____.	Hindi ako marunong magsalita ng ____.
I only understand ____.	Matindyan ku laman ____.	Maawatak ti ____ laeng.	Naiintindihan ko lang ang ____.
I don't understand.	Marik nga matindyan.	Diak maawatan.	Hindi ko maintindihan.
I understand.	Matindyan ku.	Maawatak.	Naiintindihan ko.
Help.	Pakiufun. Ufunan mu yakan. Mauag ku ya ufun.	Tulongan nak.	Tulong. Saklolo. Tulungan mo ako.
Where's the bathroom?	Dyanna ya banyu?	Ayanna ti banyo?	Saan ang banyo?
What time is it?	Hanna yo orat ngin?	Ania ti orasen?	Anong oras na?
Who is he/she?	Inya iggina?	Sino isu?	Sino siya?
What do you mean?	Hanna yo kayat mu nga kayan?	Ana kayat mo saw-en?	Ano ang ibig mong sabihin?
Pardon?/Please say it again.	Puedem nga kayan uli? Pakiulit mu yo kinahim.	Ulitem man ti inbagam.	Pakiulit yung sinabi mo. Pakiulit nga?
Please write it down.	Iturat mu.	Isurat mo man.	Pakisulat.
Let's go.	Anteran. Umang tera ngin. Katsaw ngin. Teran. Tsin.	Ingkan. Mapan tayon. Intayun.	Tara.
Wait.	So abit. Mattaron ka. Taronan mu yakan.	Aguray ka. Mabiit lang.	Saglit. Teka lang.
Can I speak to ____?	Puedek kergo y ____?	Mabalin a makasarita ni ____?	Pwede ko kausapin si ____?
monkey	ayong	bakes sunggo	unggoy matsing
pig	bavi	babuy	baboy
cliff	zizzig	rangkis	bangin
animal	ayam	ayup	hayop
snake	zariyyang	uleg	ahas

Comparison to Ibanag

Itawit	Ibanag	English
isa	tadday	one
dua	dua	two
tallu	tallu	three
appat	appa'	four
lima	lima	five
annam	annam	six
pitu	pitu	seven
walu	walu	eight
siam	siam	nine
mafulu	mafulu	ten
Yo ngahan ku e Ben.	I ngagak ku ay Ben.	My name is Ben.
Janna yo nagafuanam mu?	Sitau y naggafuanam mu?	Where did you come from?
Hanna yo kinnam mu?	Anni y kinnam mu?	What did you eat?
Hanna yo kanakanam mu?	Anni y kanakanam mu?	What are you eating?
Nakakan kami zinan nu nallabbet iggina.	Nakakak kami nacuan nu limibbe yayya.	We would have eaten, had they arrived.
Hanna yo kanam mu sangaw?	Anni y kanam mu sangaw?	What are you going to eat?
Maddagun kami mangan kustu nallabbet iggina.	Maddaguk kami kuman kustu nallabbe yayya.	We were eating while he/she arrived home.
