= Caquenga's Revolt =

1607 revolt

Caquenga's Revolt occurred in 1607 in the area of modern-day Rizal, Cagayan. The leader of the revolt was Andrés Caquenga, an animist priestess in the Malaueg community. The arrival of Fray Pedro, a Dominican friar, triggered a revolt that spread throughout the surrounding region.

== Background ==
With the creation of the Nueva Segovia diocese in 1595 in the Cagayan Valley, Catholic missionaries from Europe began flooding into the region to convert the indigenous inhabitants to Catholicism. According to the Dominican account, Pagulayan, the chief of Nalfotan, tried contacting Catholic missionaries for years. Fray Pedro accepted the invitation and went to Nalfotan to visit Pagulayan and the Malaueg people, finding a church erected and the people waiting to adopt the religion. However, Caquenga, an indigenous animist leader, stopped the friar. Christianity posed a threat to her indigenous animism, and Catholic missionaries and Spanish officials worked to eradicate their beliefs. In response to this threat against her spiritual beliefs, Caquenga gathered a group of followers and revolted against the priest.

== Revolt ==
One night, following protests for liberty, Caquenga and her Malaueg followers tore down their houses, killed their livestock, destroyed their fields, and fled to the mountains. In the mountains, they joined Nalfotan's enemy village and made plans to fight against the Catholic missionaries and their supporters. Aware of a potential attack, Pedro and Pagulayan sent a Nalfotan local to talk to the enemy village's leader, Furaganan. The local convinced Furaganan to go to Nalfotan and talk to Pedro and Pagulayan. The three men made peace, and the two villages did not fight. Furaganan made the claim that Caquenga was a slave that formerly belonged to his mother. Seeing that as an opportunity to dispose of Caquenga, Pagulayan gave Caquenga over to Furaganan and she entered back into slavery.

Despite this peace treaty, the rebels resumed fighting. Caquenga's followers entered the Catholic Church in Nalfotan, desecrated the sacred relics, and burned the structure down. The Dominican historian Diego Aduarte said the following of the desecration: "They tore the ornaments of the mass into pieces, to wear as head-cloths, or as ribbons. They tore the leaves out of the missal, and drank from the chalice, like a people without God, governed by the devil." One rebel took the image of the Virgin Mary and shot it with arrows, mocking the Christian God while doing so.

These rebels were eventually apprehended, and the belligerent who shot the image of the Virgin Mary was publicly executed, presenting a threatening reminder to the people of what would happen to them if they continued to rebel and defile the sacred objects of the Catholic Church. However, neither this execution nor the enslavement of Caquenga stopped the rebellions. More revolts broke out in surrounding villages, and the missionaries and colonial officials struggled to quell them. The Dominicans attributed all of these rebellions to Caquenga, "a sorceress priestess of [the devil]."

== Aftermath ==
While Dominican accounts are not specific as to how long the revolt lasted, it is clear that Caquenga's followers caused significant damage to Nalfotan and the surrounding region. However, after nineteen years of proselytization in Nalfotan, the Dominicans claimed to have baptized 4,670 people. According to the Dominicans, they achieved this with the help of Pagulayan and his sister, Balinan. Both devoted themselves entirely to the Catholic Church, served the Dominicans faithfully, and proved to be very helpful during times of rebellion and drought.
