= Matalag River =

River in north Luzon, Philippines

Matalag River: Wangag yo Matalag; Ilog ng Matalag (Filipino)
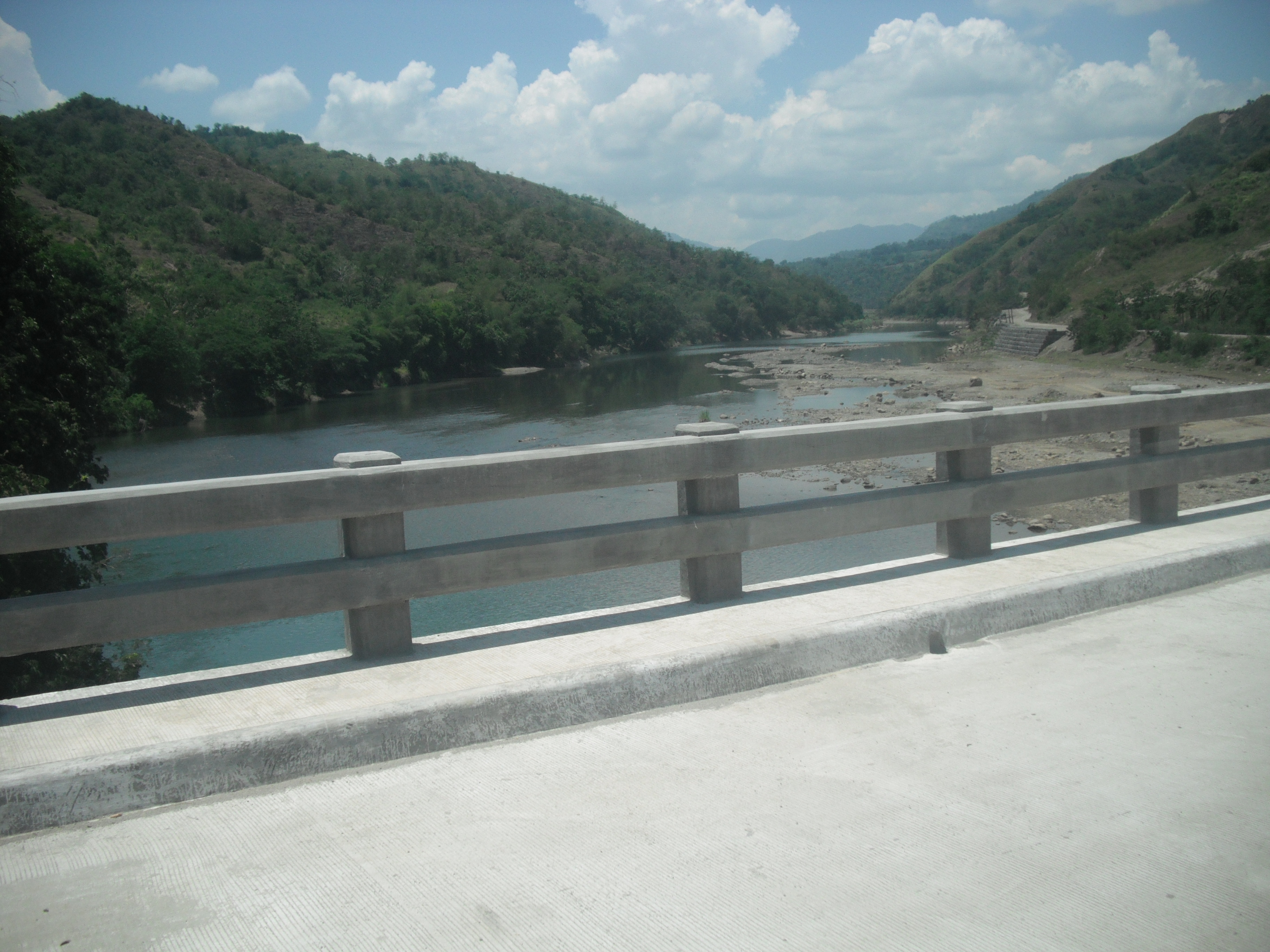
- The Matalag River and with a view of Mount Maoanan

- Matalag River mouth Matalag River (Philippines)

Location
- Country: Philippines
- Region: Cordillera Administrative Region; Cagayan Valley
- Province: Apayao; Cagayan

Physical characteristics
- Source
  - location: Cordillera mountains
- Mouth: Chico River
  - location: Rizal, Cagayan
  - coordinates: 17°49′55″N 121°27′54″E
- Length: 115 km (71 mi)
- Basin size: 1,330 km^{2} (510 sq mi)

Basin features
- Progression: Matalag–Chico–Cagayan

The Matalag River is a river in the Philippines flowing from the town of Kabugao in Apayao province to Rizal town in Cagayan province. It is a tributary of the Chico River, which later joins the Cagayan River, the longest river in the country. The Isneg people settled within its area.
