= Saint Raymond of Peñafort Parish Church (Malaueg) =

Roman Catholic church in Cagayan, Philippines

Malaueg Church
- Saint Raymond of Peñafort Parish Church
- Rizal Church
- Iglesia Parroquial de San Raimundo de Peñafort (Spanish)
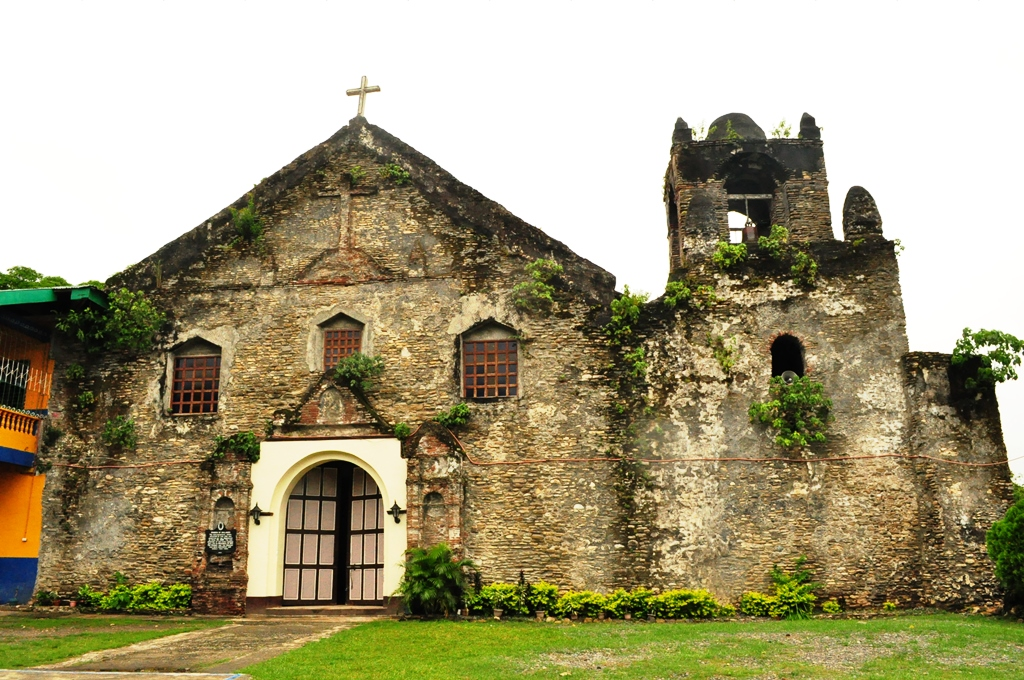
- Church facade in 2013

- Location in Luzon Location in the Philippines
- 17°50′42″N 121°20′42″E
- Location: Rizal, Cagayan
- Country: Philippines
- Denomination: Roman Catholic

History
- Status: Parish church
- Founded: 1607
- Dedication: Saint Raymond of Penyafort

Architecture
- Functional status: Active
- Heritage designation: National Cultural treasure
- Designated: 2001
- Architectural type: Church building
- Style: Baroque, Fortress church
- Groundbreaking: November 26, 1617

Specifications
- Materials: brick, sand, gravel, cement, steel

Administration
- Archdiocese: Tuguegarao

Clergy
- Archbishop: Ricardo Baccay

Saint Raymond of Peñafort Parish Church, commonly known as Malaueg Church or Rizal Church, is an early 17th-century Baroque Roman Catholic church located at Brgy. Poblacion, Rizal, Cagayan, Philippines. The parish church, with Saint Raymond of Peñafort as its titular patron, is under the jurisdiction of the Archdiocese of Tuguegarao. The church structure has been declared a National Cultural Treasure by the National Museum of the Philippines in 2001. A marker, bearing a brief history of the church, was installed on the church's facade by the National Historical Commission of the Philippines.

== Parish history ==
The site of present-day Rizal (formerly Malaueg) was a significant mission center for the Dominican missionaries spreading Christianity on the Cagayan Valley and the foot of the Cordillera mountain range. The Dominican priests officially established Malaueg in 1607 and laid the foundations of the present church in November 26, 1617.

== Architecture ==
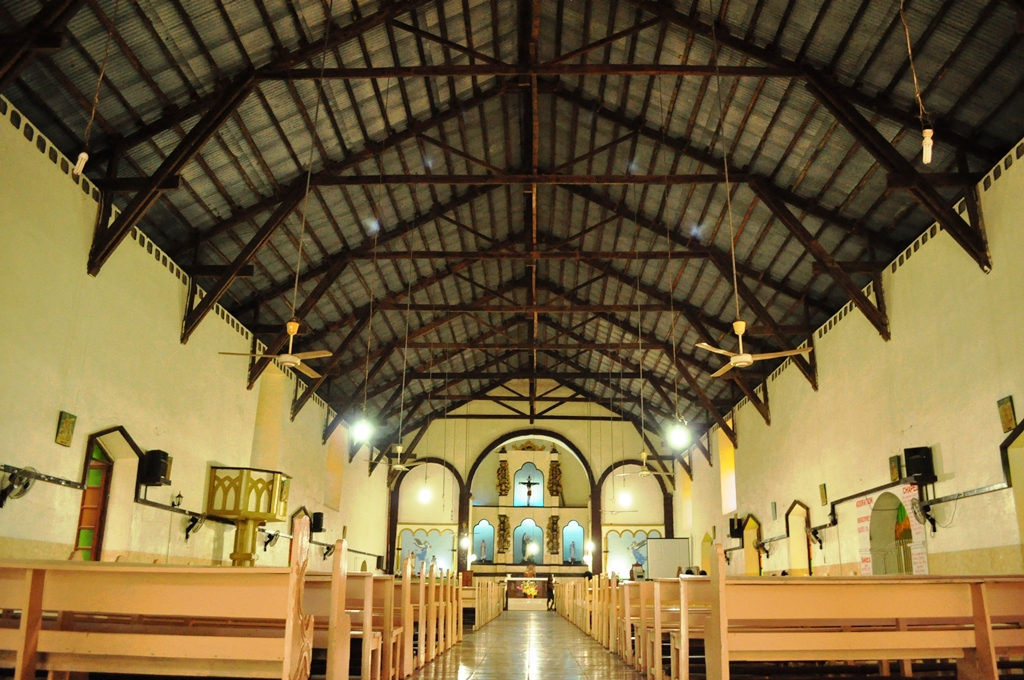
Church interior in 2013

The church, made mostly of fired bricks, is unique among other Spanish-era churches established by the Dominicans in the Cagayan Valley region due to its smaller size and novel design. The church's brickwork has been described as “of free use” and that it exudes an earthy feel. Attention on the façade is focused on the main arched portal which is framed by a plastered white wall capped with a small triangular pediment. The main doorway is flanked with saints’ niches. At the upper level of the façade are rectangular windows set in recessed triangular pedimented frames. A relief of a cross serves as ornamentation to the triangular pediment capping the entire façade. The three-level bell tower stands on the left of the façade. It features a conical roof and finials jutting out of the corners of each level.
