= Malaweg language =

Language of northern Philippines

Malaweg
- Native to: Philippines
- Region: Luzon
- Native speakers: (14,500 cited 1990 census)
- Language family: Austronesian: Malayo-Polynesian; Philippine; Northern Luzon; Cagayan Valley; Itawis; Malaweg

Language codes
- ISO 639-3: None (mis)
- Glottolog: mala1534

Malaweg (Malaueg) is an Austronesian language spoken by the Malaweg people in the northern part of the Philippines. Ethnologue lists it as a dialect of the Itawis language. Malaweg is mostly spoken in the Northern Cordillera Mountain Range region and some in the Province of Cagayan, with the majority in the town of Rizal. Ninety-eight percent of the people living in Rizal are Malaweg-speaking, and the town is known as "The Premier Town of the Malaweg".

== Origin ==
From Fr. Jose Bugarin's Ibanag Dictionary "Ueg [modern: uweg], river estuary. Pl. ueueg [uweweg] = Malaueg: a town in this province, in the district of Itaves (Itawis, now Chico River)"

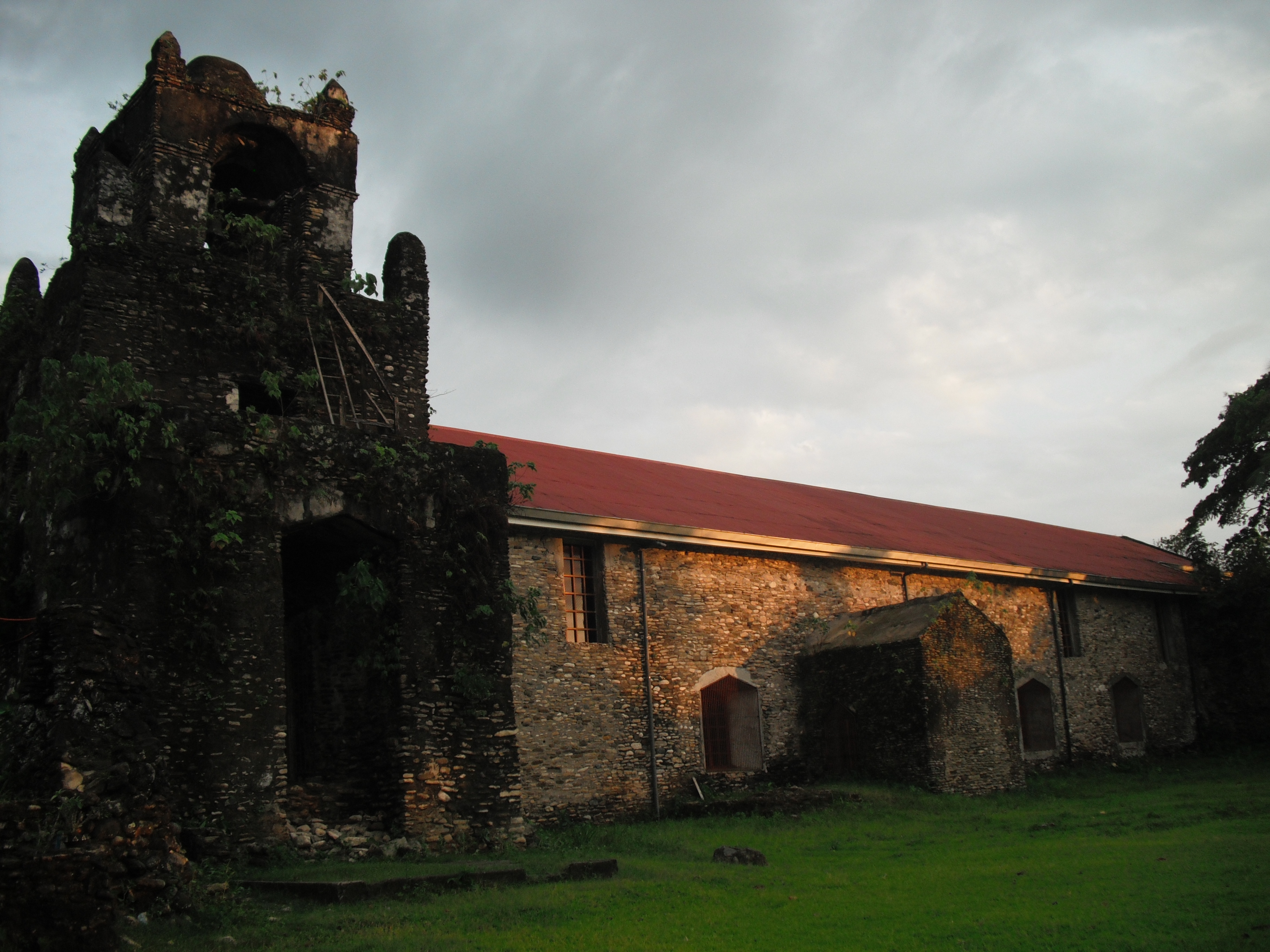
The Malaueg Church in Rizal, Cagayan
