= Piat, Cagayan =

Municipality in Cagayan, Philippines

Piat
- Municipality
- Municipality of Piat
- Welcome arch

- Seal
- Nickname: Pilgrimage Center of Cagayan Valley
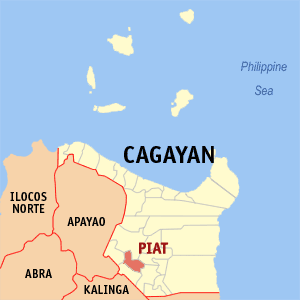
- Map of Cagayan with Piat highlighted
- Interactive map of Piat
- Location within the Philippines
- Coordinates: 17°47′31″N 121°28′37″E
- Country: Philippines
- Region: Cagayan Valley
- Province: Cagayan
- District: 2nd district
- Founded: 1610
- Barangays: 18 (see Barangays)

Government
  - Type: Sangguniang Bayan
  - Mayor: Carmelo O. Villacete
  - Vice Mayor: Leonel C. Guzman
  - Representative: Samantha Louise V. Alfonso
  - Electorate: 17,910 voters (2025)

Area
  - Total: 139.60 km^{2} (53.90 sq mi)
- Elevation: 43 m (141 ft)
- Highest elevation: 196 m (643 ft)
- Lowest elevation: 13 m (43 ft)

Population (2024 census)
  - Total: 25,436
  - Density: 182.21/km^{2} (471.91/sq mi)
  - Households: 6,123

Economy
  - Income class: 3rd municipal income class
  - Poverty incidence: 9.01% (2023)
  - Revenue: ₱ 164.1 million (2024)
  - Assets: ₱ 376.2 million (2024)
  - Expenditure: ₱ 127.4 million (2024)
  - Liabilities: ₱ 76.34 million (2024)

Service provider
  - Electricity: Cagayan 1 Electric Cooperative (CAGELCO 1)
- Time zone: UTC+8 (PST)
- ZIP code: 3527
- PSGC: 0201520000
- IDD : area code: +63 (0)78
- Native languages: Ibanag; Ilocano; Itawis; Tagalog

Piat, officially the Municipality of Piat (Ibanag: Ili nat Piat; Itawit: Babalay/Ili yo Piat; Ilocano: Ili ti Piat; Tagalog: Bayan ng Piat), is a municipality in the province of Cagayan, Philippines. According to the 2024 census, it has a population of 25,436 people.

It is dubbed as the "Pilgrimage Center of Cagayan Valley" because of the volume of devotees and tourists who come over to pay homage. It is the home of Our Lady of Piat which continues to be the source of inspiration and object of devotion of many Catholics in the region.

== Etymology ==
There are quite a few conjectures on how Piat got its name. One has it that it derives from "pias," an Ilokano word, in Ibanag "addulu" and in Tagalog, "kamiyas." Another holds that the word comes from "aggapiya," meaning "healer, masseuse," and a more credible version has it that it is derived from the Ibanag and Itawes word "piya" which means "goodness, kindness, health." The latter words were said to have come from a healer or masseur who lived in the area.

From Fr. Jose Bugarin's Dictionary "Pia-t, a tree, and the name of a town in the province in the Ytaves (Itawes) district."

== History ==
The original people were the Itawes; at present, there are many Ibanag, Ilocano, Tagalog, Kapampangan and other speakers. There are also families of Spanish and American descent. The head of the family was called urayan or baruwang and the council of elders Kammaranan. There were also war leaders and braves called mengal, and priestesses called anitera from the Spanish word called anito or minangilu in Ibanag, mangilut in Itawes and baybaylan in Bisayan; there were few priests among the ancient people.

In 1596, the Dominican Provincial, Fr. Miguel de San Jacinto named Piat as a mission in the Itawes region comprising the towns of Tabang, Malaueg, Tuao, and Piat. The encomenderos then were Pedro Barreda, Juan de Arranda, and Isabel de Cardona.

In 1604, the Bishop, Diego de Soria, negotiated for more missionaries for the Itawes region. To help in the pacification and evangelization of the region, the Dominicans introduced the devotion to Our Lady of the Most Holy Rosary. In that year, they brought the images of Our Lady of Piat from Macau and first enshrined it in Lal-lo, and later bringing it back to Piat in 1622.

== Geography ==
It is located in the south-west part of Cagayan province in what is known as the Itawes Region, along which the Rio Chico runs west, south, and north-west of the town until it debouches into the Rio Ibanag somewhere near Nassiping.

Piat is situated 39.12 kilometres (24.31 mi) from the provincial capital Tuguegarao, and 507.01 kilometres (315.04 mi) from the country's capital city of Manila.

=== Barangays ===
Piat is politically subdivided into 18 barangays. Each barangay consists of puroks while some have sitios.

- Apayao
- Aquib
- Baung
- Calaoagan
- Catarauan
- Dugayung
- Gumarueng
- Macapil
- Maguilling
- Minanga
- Poblacion I
- Poblacion II
- Santa Barbara
- Santo Domingo
- Sicatna
- Villa Rey (San Gaspar)
- Villa Reyno
- Warat

=== Climate ===
Climate data for Piat, Cagayan
| Month | Jan | Feb | Mar | Apr | May | Jun | Jul | Aug | Sep | Oct | Nov | Dec | Year |
|---|---|---|---|---|---|---|---|---|---|---|---|---|---|
| Mean daily maximum °C (°F) | 26 (79) | 27 (81) | 29 (84) | 32 (90) | 32 (90) | 32 (90) | 31 (88) | 30 (86) | 30 (86) | 29 (84) | 28 (82) | 26 (79) | 29 (85) |
| Mean daily minimum °C (°F) | 21 (70) | 21 (70) | 22 (72) | 23 (73) | 24 (75) | 25 (77) | 25 (77) | 25 (77) | 24 (75) | 24 (75) | 23 (73) | 22 (72) | 23 (74) |
| Average precipitation mm (inches) | 109 (4.3) | 78 (3.1) | 64 (2.5) | 54 (2.1) | 181 (7.1) | 196 (7.7) | 204 (8.0) | 211 (8.3) | 174 (6.9) | 198 (7.8) | 185 (7.3) | 231 (9.1) | 1,885 (74.2) |
| Average rainy days | 17.2 | 13.7 | 13.2 | 13.0 | 21.7 | 23.4 | 25.2 | 25.2 | 21.9 | 17.7 | 18.6 | 20.8 | 231.6 |
Source: Meteoblue

== Demographics ==
Population census of Piat

| Year | Pop. | ±% p.a. |
|---|---|---|
| 1903 | 3,632 | — |
| 1918 | 4,646 | +1.66% |
| 1939 | 6,507 | +1.62% |
| 1948 | 7,099 | +0.97% |
| 1960 | 11,099 | +3.79% |
| 1970 | 11,528 | +0.38% |
| 1975 | 11,949 | +0.72% |
| 1980 | 14,046 | +3.29% |

| Year | Pop. | ±% p.a. |
|---|---|---|
| 1990 | 17,771 | +2.38% |
| 1995 | 17,472 | −0.32% |
| 2000 | 20,524 | +3.51% |
| 2007 | 22,211 | +1.10% |
| 2010 | 22,961 | +1.22% |
| 2015 | 23,597 | +0.52% |
| 2020 | 24,805 | +1.06% |
| 2024 | 25,436 | +0.60% |

Source: Philippine Statistics Authority

In the 2024 census the population of Piat was 25,436 people with a density of 180 inhabitants per square kilometre or 470 inhabitants per square mile.

== Economy ==
Poverty incidence of Piat (%)

Source: Philippine Statistics Authority

== Government ==
=== Local government ===
As a municipality in the Province of Cagayan, government officials in the provincial level are voted by the town. The provincial government has political jurisdiction over most local transactions of the municipal government.

The municipality of Piat is governed by a mayor, designated as its local chief executive, and by a municipal council as its legislative body in accordance with the Local Government Code. The mayor, vice mayor, and the municipal councilors are elected directly by the people through an election held every three years.

Barangays are also headed by elected officials: Barangay Captain, Barangay Council, whose members are called Barangay Councilors. The barangays have SK federation which represents the barangay, headed by SK chairperson and whose members are called SK councilors. All officials are also elected every three years.

=== Elected officials ===
Members of the Municipal Council (2019–2022)
| Position | Name |
|---|---|
| Congressman | Baby Alyne Vargas Alfonso |
| Mayor | Leonel C. Guzman |
| Vice-Mayor | Reymundo Villacete III |
| Councilors | David Sto. Tomas, Jr. |
| Councilors | Marissa Beata A. Gonzales |
| Councilors | Rodjozmond Guzman |
| Councilors | Tito Eugene T. Bingayan |
| Councilors | Juliet Domingo |
| Councilors | Cipriano Cureg |
| Councilors | Rovilio Casibang |
| Councilors | Femardo Baligod |

=== Congress representation ===
Piat, belonging to the second legislative district of the province of Cagayan, is represented by Samantha Louise V. Alfonso in the house of representatives.

== Education ==
The Schools Division of Cagayan governs the town's public education system. The division office is a field office of the DepEd in Cagayan Valley region. The Piat Schools District Office governs the public and private elementary and high schools throughout the municipality.

=== Primary and elementary School ===
- Apayao Elementary School
- Catarauan Elementary School
- Dugayung Elementary School
- Gumarueng Elementary School
- Macapil Elementary School
- Minanga Elementary School
- Piat Central School
- Sicatna Elementary School
- Sta. Barbara-Maguilling Elementary School
- Sto. Domingo Elementary School
- Villa Rey Elementary School
- Warat Elementary School

=== Secondary schools ===
- Our Lady of Piat High School
- Piat Academy
- Piat National High School

== Tourism ==
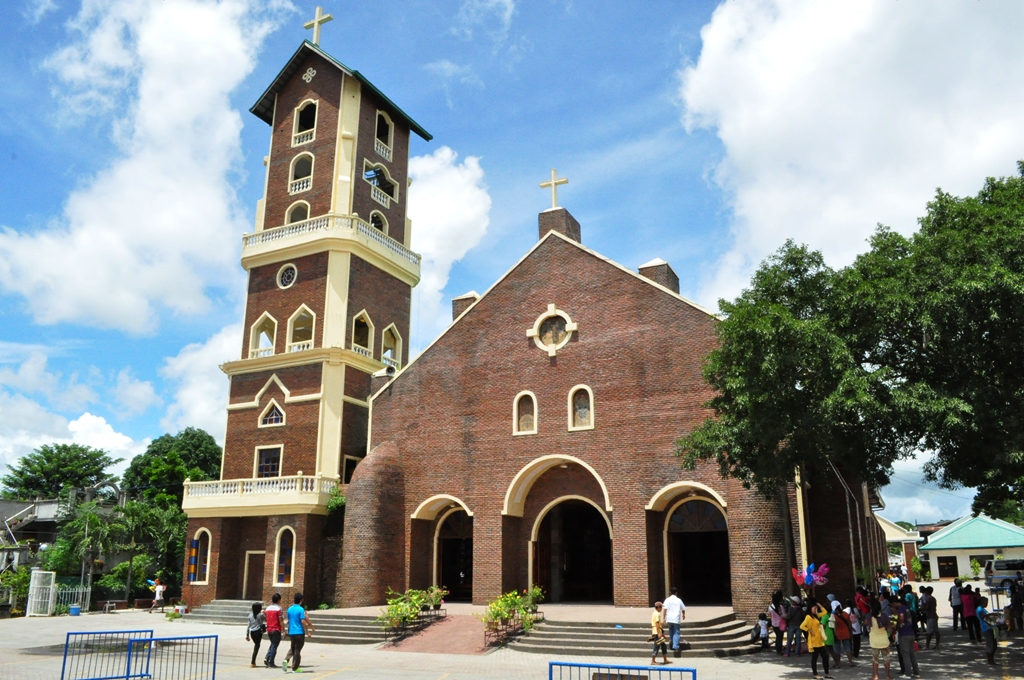
Front of the Minor Basilica of Piat in Piat, Cagayan

=== Basilica of Our Lady of Piat ===
This site is visited by Roman Catholic pilgrims and is believed to exhibit miracles. The Basilica Minore of Our Lady of Piat is one of only 13 minor basilicas in the Philippines. It is distinguished as the home of the venerated Black Virgin Mary. The interior contains curved ceilings made of wood with historical images and accounts along the tops of the walls. Verandas inside the church add to the shrine's elegance. On the altar lies the Blessed Virgin Mary covered in glass. At the back of the church is a staircase leading to a window opening onto the back of the Virgin Mary where devotees can touch the dress of Our Lady.

=== Bukal ng Buhay ===
This spring allegedly bestows miracles and blessings. In April 2005, the spring started to draw crowds of devotees along with the woman who dreamed of the Miraculous Lady of Visitation of Piat. 10 years earlier while working abroad she received a dream where it was insisted that she personally go to Piat to look for the hidden spring near the sanctuary on the hill where the Miraculous Lady was being enshrined. From that day on the spring became a crowd attraction, even drawing people from the medical fields. Devotees share stories on how they get healed of their ailments or recover from their surgical operations after drinking and washing themselves with the miraculous water drawn from this “Bukal ng Buhay”. The bukal was featured on several television documentaries in the Philippines such as Rated K and Kapuso Mo, Jessica Soho.
