= Chico River (Philippines) =

River in north Luzon, Philippines

Chico River Río Chico de Cagayán
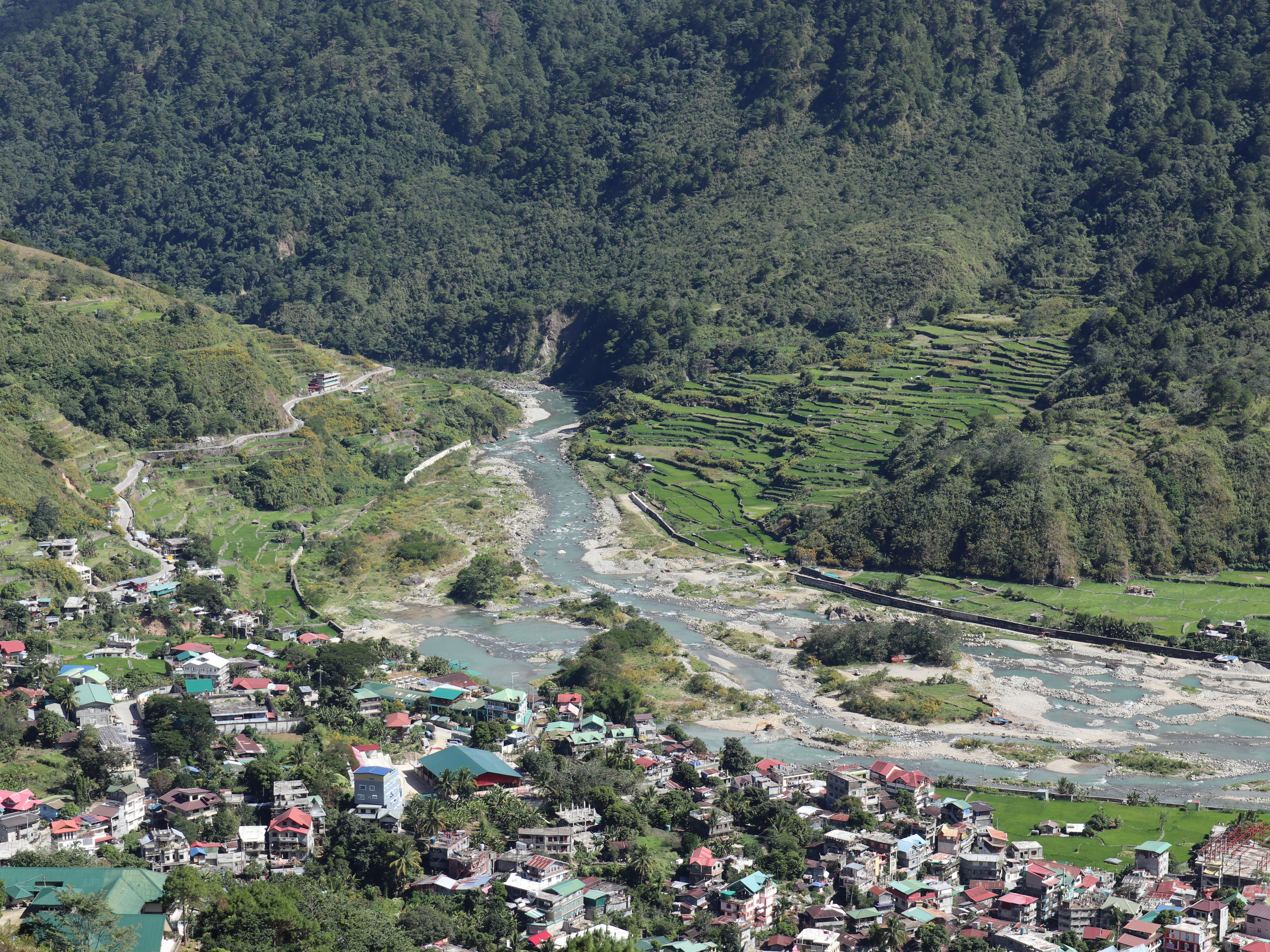
- The river along Bontoc

- Chico River mouth Chico River (Philippines) (Philippines)

Location
- Country: Philippines
- Region: Cordillera Administrative Region; Cagayan Valley
- Province: Mountain Province; Kalinga; Cagayan

Physical characteristics
- Source
  - location: Mount Data, Cordillera mountains
  - coordinates: 16°55′01″N 120°54′26″E
  - elevation: 2,079 m (6,821 ft)
- Mouth: Cagayan River
  - location: Santo Niño, Cagayan, Cagayan Valley
  - coordinates: 17°57′43″N 121°36′37″E
  - elevation: 5 m (16 ft)
- Length: 233 km (145 mi)
- Basin size: 5,850 km^{2} (2,260 sq mi)
- Discharge
  - location: Cagayan River
  - average: 410 m^{3}/s (14,000 cu ft/s)

Basin features
- Progression: Chico–Cagayan
- Tributaries
  - left: Mabaca River; Saltan River; Pasil River
  - right: Bunog River; Tanudan River; Biga River

The Chico River (Spanish: Río Chico de Cagayán), is a river system in the Philippines in the island of Luzon, encompassing the regions of Cordillera and Cagayan Valley. It is the longest tributary of the Cagayan River with a total length of 233 km (145 mi).

The most extensive river in the Cordillera region, it covers the provinces of Mountain Province, Kalinga and Cagayan. It is referred to as a "river of life" for the Kalinga people who live on its banks, and is well known among development workers because of the Chico River Dam Project, an electric power generation project which local residents resisted for three decades before it was finally shelved in the 1980s - a landmark case study concerning ancestral domain issues in the Philippines.

== Geography ==
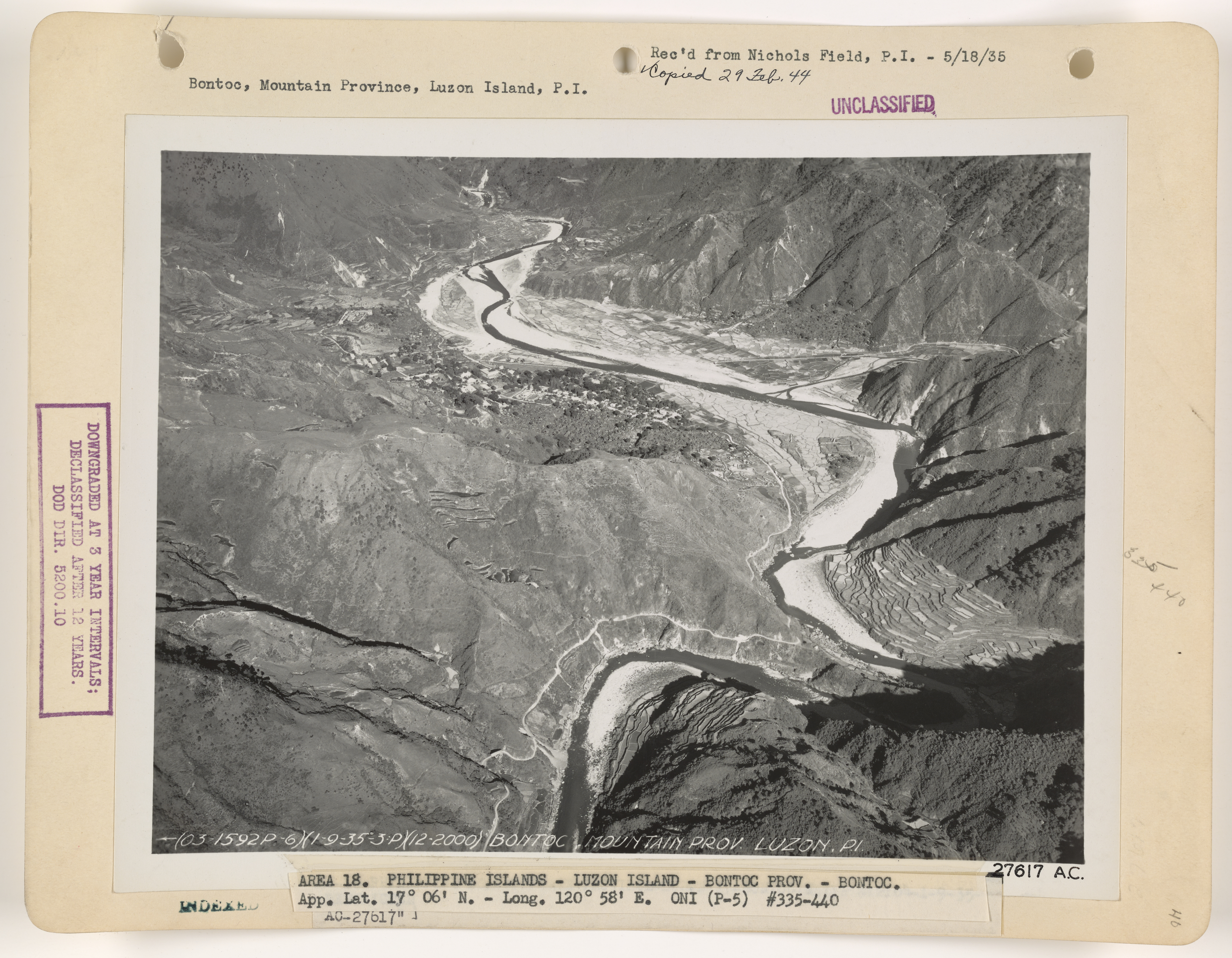
Aerial view of Bontoc and Chico River, 1935

The Chico River, has a total length of 233 kilometres (145 mi), making it the longest tributary of the Cagayan River, itself the largest river in the Philippines. For centuries it has been central to farming, trading, livelihoods, and daily life, whether as a benefit or hindrance. It provided a source of water for washing and irrigation, and habitat for carabao who had to be led to a watering hole daily. At times it might be an obstacle to settlements on the other side of the river, but until the last century this was an opportunity for enterprising Filipinos who would provide ferry transport. Now, bridges suitable for vehicles have been built. The danger of flooding was less frequent due to being at a higher elevation than the bigger, flood-prone Cagayan into which it feeds.

=== Source and course ===
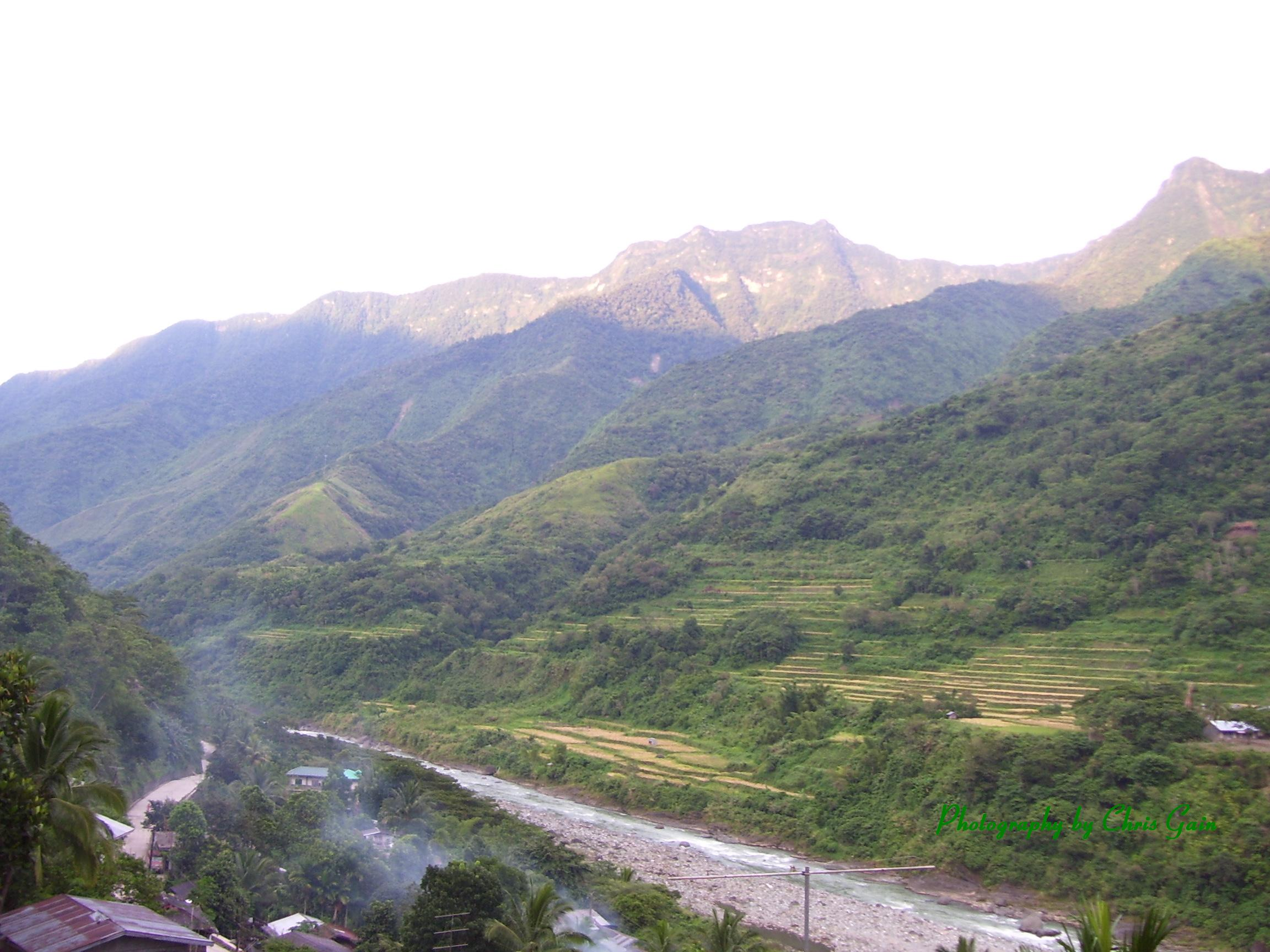
The river along Tinglayan

The highest headwaters begin along the slopes of Mount Data in the Cordillera mountains at Bauko, Mountain Province. It then flows northeastward through and next to cities and municipalities including Bontoc, Sabangan, Sadanga, Tinglayan, Lubuagan, Tabuk, Pinukpuk, Tuao, Piat, Rizal, finally arriving at Santo Niño, where it merges with the Cagayan River.

Its tributaries are the Bunog River to the south, The Tanudan and Biga Rivers to the east, The Mabaca and Saltan Rivers to the North, and the Pasil River further downstream.
