= Rizal, Cagayan =

Municipality in Cagayan, Philippines

Rizal Malaueg
- Municipality
- Municipality of Rizal
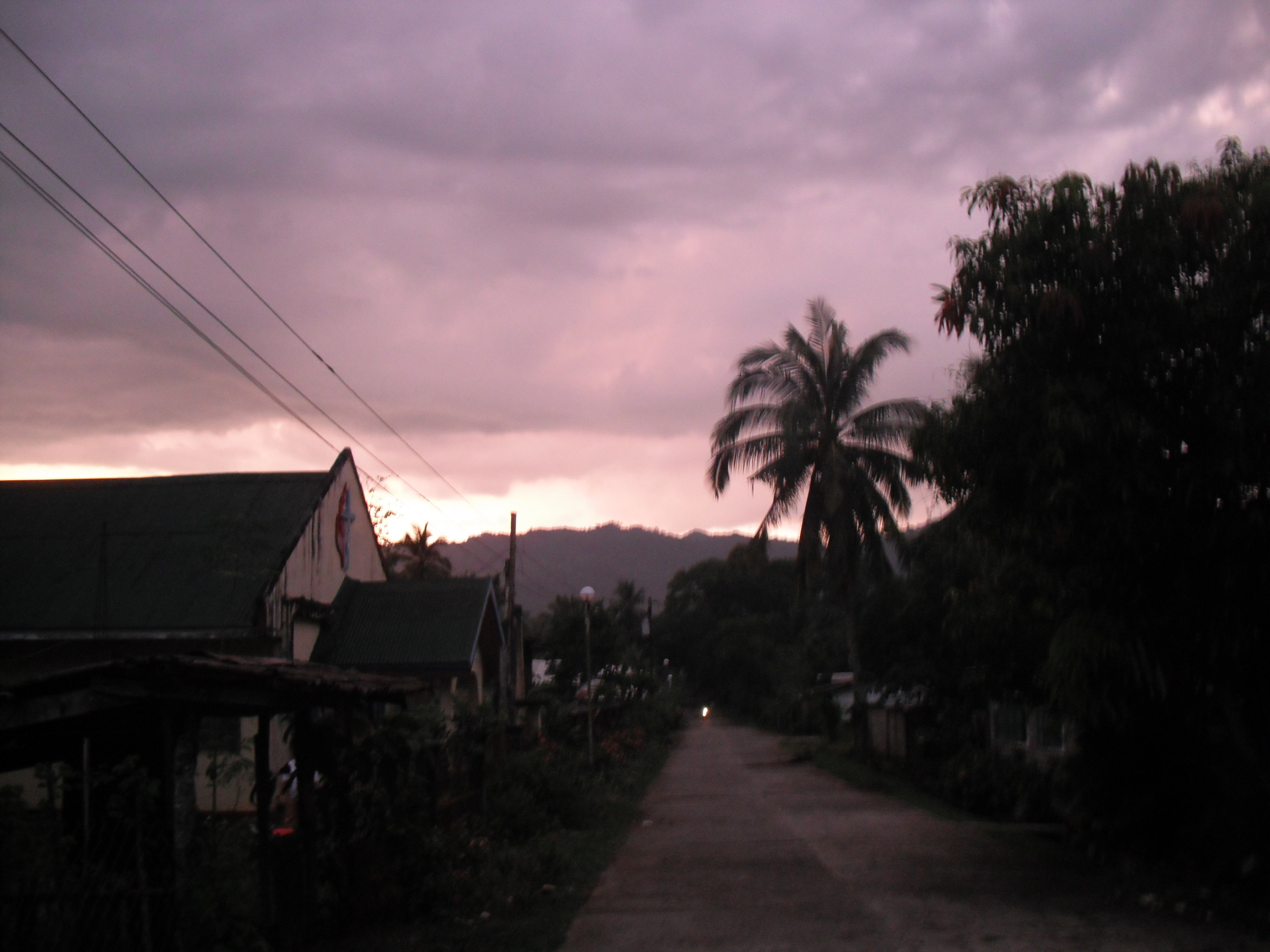
- Sunset in the Mount. Annaguan

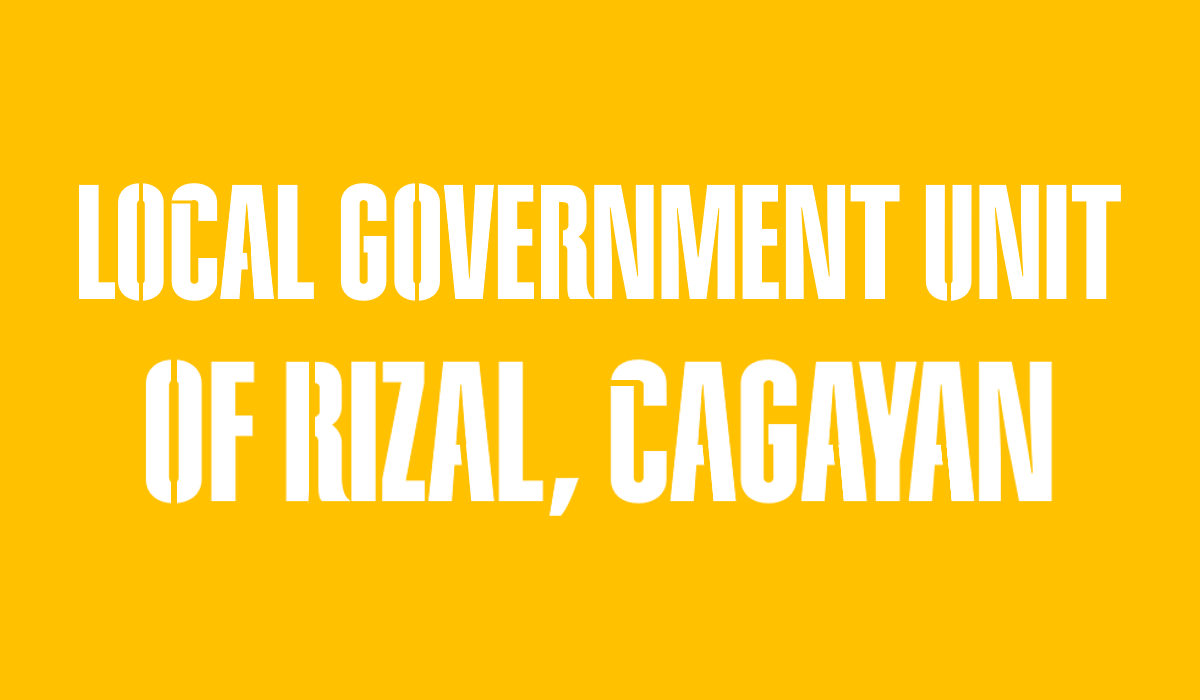
- Flag Seal
- Motto: Tanu napakesan nonta nasiksikan Rise Up Malaueg
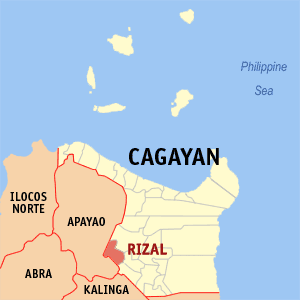
- Map of Cagayan with Rizal highlighted
- Interactive map of Rizal
- Location within the Philippines
- Coordinates: 17°50′52″N 121°20′42″E
- Country: Philippines
- Region: Cagayan Valley
- Province: Cagayan
- District: 2nd district
- Founded: 1522
- Named for: José Rizal
- Barangays: 29 (see Barangays)

Government
  - Type: Sangguniang Bayan
  - Mayor: Jamila Denise B. Ruma
  - Vice Mayor: Atty. Brenda B. Ruma
  - Representative: Baby Aline Vargas-Alfonso
  - Electorate: 13,048 voters (2025)

Area
  - Total: 124.40 km^{2} (48.03 sq mi)
- Elevation: 179 m (587 ft)
- Highest elevation: 847 m (2,779 ft)
- Lowest elevation: 36 m (118 ft)

Population (2024 census)
  - Total: 19,577
  - Density: 157.37/km^{2} (407.59/sq mi)
  - Households: 4,485

Economy
  - Income class: 4th municipal income class
  - Poverty incidence: 13.44% (2023)
  - Revenue: ₱ 128.5 million (2024)
  - Assets: ₱ 368.9 million (2024)
  - Expenditure: ₱ 162 million (2024)
  - Liabilities: ₱ 201.9 million (2024)

Service provider
  - Electricity: Cagayan 1 Electric Cooperative (CAGELCO 1)
- Time zone: UTC+8 (PST)
- ZIP code: 3526
- PSGC: 0201521000
- IDD : area code: +63 (0)78
- Native languages: Malaueg; Ibanag; Itawis; Ilocano; Atta; Tagalog
- Website: www.rizal-cagayan.gov.ph

Rizal, officially the Municipality of Rizal, is a municipality in the province of Cagayan, Philippines. According to the 2024 census, it has a population of 19,577 people.

In the 21st century, the town grew notorious for the multiple incidents of assassinations among local politicians, with three mayors being killed since the 1980s.

== History ==
=== Spanish regime ===
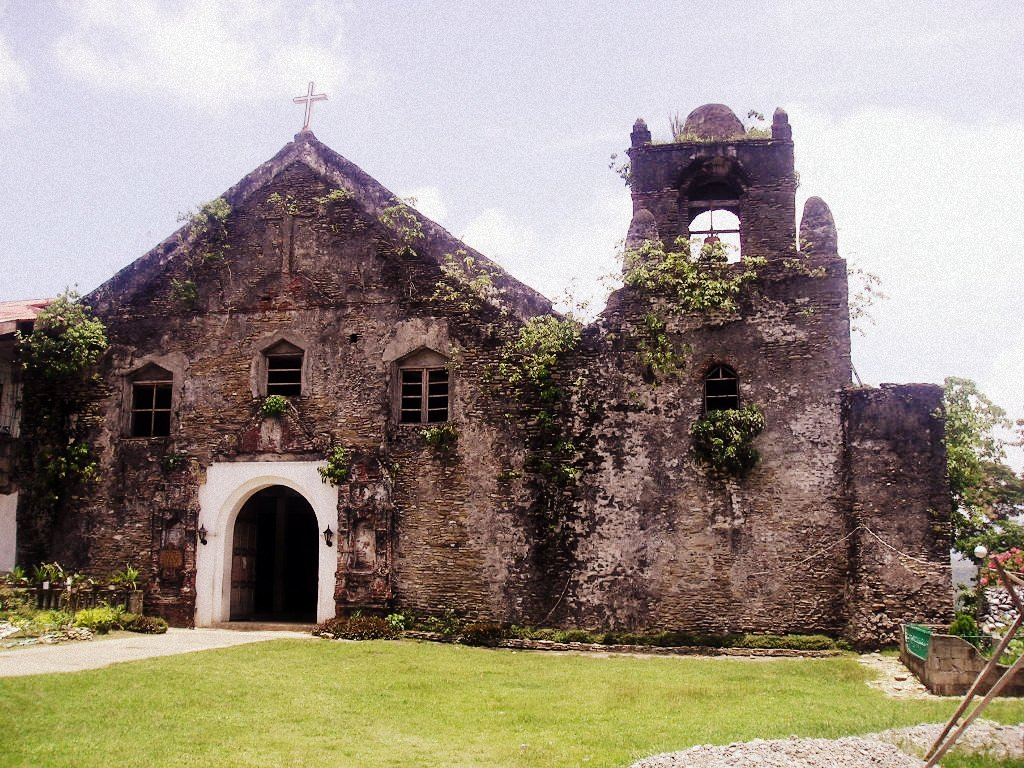
Malaueg church

The incorporation of the town was dated early 1500s during the Spanish era in the Philippines. At that time, the town was called "Malaueg", from the word "ueg" that means creek or river. The name was used until 1903 when the town was renamed in honor of Filipino nationalist José Rizal.

During the Spanish regime, the town was said to be the rest spots of the Spanish Authorities, friars and some locals, because of its cool environmental climate. Malaueg people build the largest stone convents for the friars, some nipa hut houses for Spanish Authorities and some ordinary houses for the locals. Malaueg became a center of Christianity next to Nueva Segovia after the Malaueg Church was built.

In 1607, the area was the site of Caquenga's Revolt. With the creation of the Nueva Segovia diocese in 1595 in the Cagayan Valley, Catholic missionaries from Europe began flooding into the region to convert the indigenous inhabitants to the Catholic faith. Per the Dominican account, Pagulayan, the chief of Nalfotan, had tried contacting Catholic missionaries for years. Fray Pedro then accepted the invitation and went to Nalfotan to visit Pagulayan and the Malaueg people. To his astonishment, he found a church erected and the people waiting to adopt the religion. However, Caquenga, an indigenous animist leader, or priestess, apprehended the coming of the friar. Christianity posed a threat to her indigenous animism, and Catholic missionaries and Spanish officials worked continuously to eradicate animism. In response to this threat against her spiritual beliefs, she gathered a group of followers and they revolted against the priest.

=== American period ===
During the American occupation of the Philippines, the town of Malaueg was also a favorite spot for the Americans. During the Spanish–American War, the town was almost destroyed when the soldiers used its towering mountains to hide their ammunition and dug some trenches. The Authorities were very protective of the condition of the church during war.

The town before had two municipalities, namely: Mauanan and Malaueg. The barrios on the western and northern part belonged to the municipality of Malaueg, while the barrios on the eastern part belonged to the municipality of Mauanan, where the seat of two municipal governments was established (Philippine Commission; Act Nos. 943 and 944, enacted in 1903). Act No. 2390 changed the names of the municipalities of Santo Niño and Mauanan.

The names of the municipalities of Santo Nino and Mauanan were changed to Faire and Rizal, respectively. Mauanan was named Rizal in the year 1914 and the sitios of Lattut, Capacuaan and Macatal were annexed from Rippang in 1933, under executive Order No. 690 dated March 28, 1935.

=== Japanese occupation ===
During the Japanese occupation of the Philippines in World War II, the town was largely destroyed in bombing attacks. The town also became one of the centers of resistance in the Philippines because of its forested areas that served as a hideout.

=== Post-independence ===
In the 1980s, many residents of Rizal migrated out of town due to the threat of communist rebels, with various reports stating that it had practically become a ghost town by 1987. On June 2, 1987, more than 100 rebels overran the Rizal municipal hall and burned down the residence and trucks of former mayor Raul dela Cruz. In November 1987, dela Cruz was reinstated as mayor of Rizal by local government secretary Luis T. Santos based on a ruling by the Supreme Court.

=== 21st century; spate of assassinations ===
On the evening of December 13, 2006, 19-year-old Sangguniang Kabataan chairman Nelson "Bot" Asucena, who was a member of both Anakbayan and the peasant group Kagimungan, was assassinated outside his family's home in Barangay San Juan, Zinundungan Valley by six military men after he served them the coffee and water they had requested upon visiting. Asucena's father, Hipolito, later testified that Army Lt. Marcelo Pascua, a family friend, had perpetrated the assassination, but officials from the Philippine Army denied the military's involvement in the incident, accusing the human rights group Karapatan of fabricating facts. A fact-finding mission by ecology group Taripnon, joined by Asucena's father and wife, was prevented from entering Barangay San Juan on January 20, 2007 by Pascua himself, who claimed that the area was restricted.

On February 13, 2007, nine alleged contract killers, most of whom were from Cagayan, were arrested in Biñan, Laguna at an election checkpoint along the South Luzon Expressway (SLEX), with police authorities claiming that they were members of the New People's Army (NPA) rebel group based on the weapons and explosives found in their van. The police further claimed that they had been heading back to Cagayan after failing to find their targets in San Pedro, Laguna: two mayoral candidates of Rizal that were opponents of mayor Raul dela Cruz in the 2007 election. Two of those arrested were minors from Tuguegarao.

On July 18, 2008, retired constabulary officer Elmer Baligod, a cousin of defeated mayoral candidate Joel Ruma, was tending to his food stall in front of his house in Tuguegarao when he was assassinated by Chito Cauilan and five other motorcycle-riding gunmen. Baligod's two sons Edwardson and Erwin witnessed the incident and chased after the gunmen, reaching the house of mayor dela Cruz. Negotiations were held between police and mayor dela Cruz to reveal the "male persons" in the latter's residence, Edwardson and Erwin identified Cauilan, an aide to dela Cruz, as one of the gunmen, who was then arrested. Cauilan was convicted for murder in February 2016.

On the evening of December 3, 2008, mayor dela Cruz was assassinated by unknown gunmen in Solana, Cagayan, alongside three or four of his security escorts, including his driver Jomar Buluran, while in a van headed for Manila. Dela Cruz was the second Rizal mayor to be assassinated since the 1980s, after Ventura B. Baloran. Surviving bodyguards claimed that former Rizal councilor Alfredo Alvarez and his two companions were the perpetrators behind the assassination based on the voices they heard during the incident, although Alvarez himself denied the accusation.

On January 23, 2011, Inspector Antonio Rueco, Rizal's chief of police, and four other officers were killed in a landmine explosion in barangay Illuro Sur and gunfire by NPA rebels from the Danila Ben Command. Two other Rizal officers were injured.

On July 21, 2013, barangay captain Edwin Gannaban of Pasingan was assassinated by armed men a few months prior to the barangay elections, while an indicted suspect, militia member Randy Gadduan, was killed three days later. Later that year, both mayor Joel Ruma and barangay chairman Eduardo Datul of Lattut were nearly assassinated on two separate incidents by unknown gunmen.

On the evening of September 3, 2015, former councilor and ABC president Nelson Littaua, a relative of mayor dela Cruz, was assassinated in front of his home in Tuguegarao by motorcycle-riding gunmen. He had previously been wounded in an attempted assassination while driving through Solana, Cagayan in April 2008.

On July 29, 2018, incumbent councilor Alvarez was assassinated in Tuguegarao by motorcycle-riding gunmen while driving through the city to return to his Rizal residence. Police later filed murder complaints against vice mayor Joel Ruma and two of his aides based on security footage of the incident that captured the faces of the gunmen, who were identified by Alvarez's son Franklin. Ruma was later arrested in Quezon City on April 18, 2022 while he was running for mayor; he won the election a month later, succeeding Brenda Ruma, his wife, and defeating Nacionalista candidate Ralph Mamauag.

On the evening of April 23, 2025, mayor Ruma was shot dead by an unknown gunman while attending a campaign sortie in barangay Illuru Sur for his reelection; three attendees were also injured from the incident. He was replaced as vice mayor by his wife Brenda and as a candidate by her daughter Jamila, who went on to win the election against Mamauag and became the Philippines' youngest mayor at the age of 21.

== Geography ==
The Municipality of Rizal has a total land area of 32,586.671 hectares (80,523.42 acres). The land is distributed as follows: 1,000 hectares (2,500 acres) are designated as built-up areas; 5,545.0 hectares (13,702 acres) are classified as agricultural land; 267.5 hectares (661 acres) are occupied by water bodies; 8,375.1 hectares (20,695 acres) consist of open grassland; 207.0 hectares (512 acres) are allocated for roads and streets; 4.0 hectares (9.9 acres) are set aside for eco-tourism purposes; and 17,178.07 hectares (42,447.9 acres) are designated as forest zones.

The place is hilly and mountainous. The poblacion is located on a plateau. The neighbouring barangays are situated on the slopes of hills, and some are located along the banks of Matalag River.

Rizal is situated 64.34 kilometres (39.98 mi) from the provincial capital Tuguegarao, and 532.23 kilometres (330.71 mi) from the country's capital city of Manila.

=== Mountains ===
- Mount Annaguan, the highest point in the town, has the height of 1,400 metres (4,600 ft) and it can overview some neighboring towns from its peak.
- Mount Maoanan, with a height of 968.5 meters (3,177 ft), was the legendary mountain where Biuag and Malana fought a battle for a maguinganay.

The Sinicking National Park has the height of 801 meters (2,628 ft) and the highest elevation between the town's Poblacion and barangay Gaddangao is 1,004 meters (3,294 ft). The entrance to the town is very similar to the Kennon Road of Baguio.

=== Barangays ===
Rizal is politically subdivided into 29 barangays. Each barangay consists of puroks while some have sitios.

- Anagguan
- Anurturu
- Anungu
- Baluncanag
- Batu
- Cambabangan
- Capacuan
- Dunggan
- Duyun
- Gaddangao
- Gaggabutan East
- Illuru Norte
- Lattut
- Linno (Villa Cruz)
- Liuan
- Mabbang
- Mauanan
- Masi (Zinundungan)
- Minanga
- Nanauatan
- Nanungaran
- Pasingan
- Poblacion
- San Juan (Zinundungan)
- Sinicking
- Battut
- Bural (Zinundungan)
- Gaggabutan West
- Illuru Sur

=== Climate ===
Climate data for Rizal, Cagayan
Month	Jan	Feb	Mar	Apr	May	Jun	Jul	Aug	Sep	Oct	Nov	Dec	Year
Mean daily maximum °C (°F)	25 (77)	26 (79)	29 (84)	31 (88)	31 (88)	31 (88)	30 (86)	30 (86)	30 (86)	28 (82)	27 (81)	25 (77)	29 (84)
Mean daily minimum °C (°F)	20 (68)	20 (68)	21 (70)	23 (73)	24 (75)	25 (77)	25 (77)	25 (77)	24 (75)	23 (73)	23 (73)	21 (70)	23 (73)
Average precipitation mm (inches)	133 (5.2)	87 (3.4)	68 (2.7)	44 (1.7)	127 (5.0)	134 (5.3)	160 (6.3)	162 (6.4)	134 (5.3)	192 (7.6)	194 (7.6)	260 (10.2)	1,695 (66.7)
Average rainy days	18.1	13.3	13.3	11.8	19.7	20.9	22.8	22.8	20.3	16.6	18.4	21.7	219.7
Source: Meteoblue

== Demographics ==
Population census of Rizal

Year	Pop.	±% p.a.
1903	3,686	—
1918	4,791	+1.76%
1939	5,880	+0.98%
1948	5,749	−0.25%
1960	7,423	+2.15%
1970	10,460	+3.49%
1975	11,362	+1.67%
1980	11,449	+0.15%

Year	Pop.	±% p.a.
1990	12,478	+0.86%
1995	13,901	+2.04%
2000	14,929	+1.54%
2007	16,791	+1.63%
2010	18,592	+3.78%
2015	17,994	−0.62%
2020	19,077	+1.24%
2024	19,577	+0.62%

Source: Philippine Statistics Authority

In the 2024 census, the population of Rizal was 19,577 people, with a density of 160 inhabitants per square kilometer or 410 inhabitants per square mile.

=== Languages ===
The local languages are Malaueg and Ilocano.

== Economy ==
Poverty incidence of Rizal (%)

Source: Philippine Statistics Authority

== Government ==
=== Local government ===
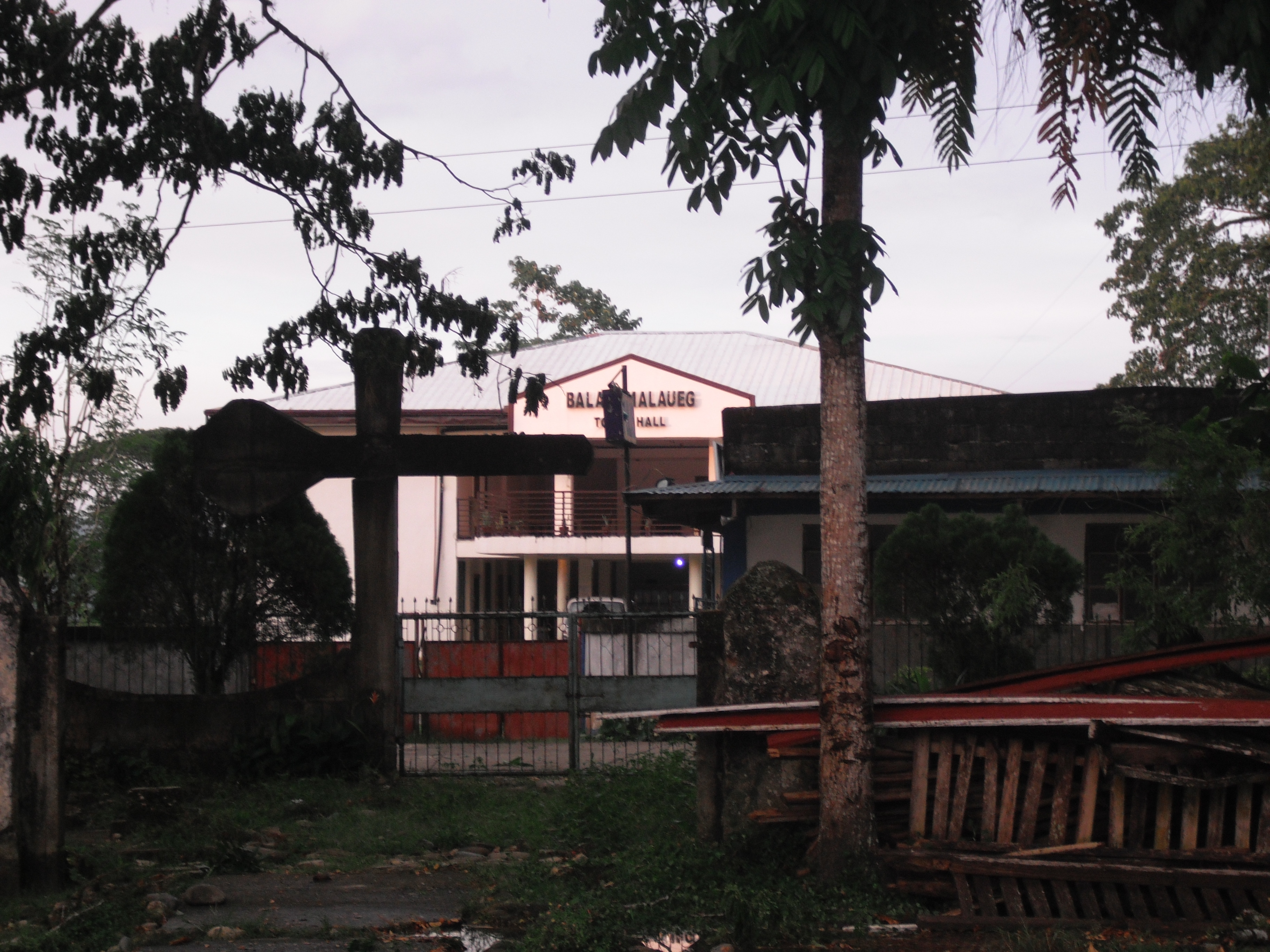
The modernized Spanish era town hall (circa 1572 when it was first built)

Rizal is part of the second legislative district of the province of Cagayan. It is governed by a mayor, designated as its local chief executive, and by a municipal council as its legislative body in accordance with the Local Government Code. The mayor, vice mayor, and the municipal councilors are elected directly by the people through an election held every three years.

== Elected officials ==
=== Members of the Municipal Council (2025–2028) ===
Name
Congressman	Baby Aline Vargas-Alfonso
Mayor	Jamila Denise B. Ruma
Vice-Mayor	Brenda B. Ruma
Councilors	Roberto F. Talay
Councilors	Eleanor R. Canapi
Councilors	Irineo D. Aday
Councilors	Esteban P. Macuring
Councilors	Luciano C. Talang
Councilors	Christopher C. Cauilan
Councilors	Johnas A. Ruma
Councilors	Jodilyn S. Favor

=== Members of the Municipal Council (2022–2025) ===
Positions	Name
Congressman	Baby Aline Vargas-Alfonso
Mayor	Joel A. Ruma
Vice-Mayor	Brenda B. Ruma
Councilors	Ireneo Bernard D. Aday
Councilors	Roberto F. Talay
Councilors	Pastor C. Ligas, Jr.
Councilors	Luciano Talang
Councilors	Graciano A. Simon
Councilors	Brian B. Ruma
Councilors	Chris Cauilan
Councilors	Lea M. Favor

=== Members of the Municipal Council (2019–2022) ===
Position	Name
Congressman	Samantha Louise V. Alfonso
Mayor	Brenda B. Ruma
Vice-Mayor	Joel A. Ruma
Councilors	Roberto F. Talay
Councilors	Johnas A. Ruma
Councilors	Pastor C. Ligas Jr.
Councilors	Orlando I. Palattao
Councilors	Leo M. Favor
Councilors	Graciano A. Simon
Councilors	Bryan B. Ruma
Councilors	Ireneo Bernard D. Aday

=== Members of the Municipal Council (2016–2019) ===
Position	Name
Congressman	Baby Aline Vargas-Alfonso
Mayor	Brenda B. Ruma
Vice-Mayor	Joel A. Ruma
Councilors	Buncag, Bubut
Councilors	Ruma,Johnas
Councilors	Simon,Graciano
Councilors	Talang,Luciano
Councilors	Alvarez,Edo
Councilors	Mamauag,Cherry
Councilors	Favor,Lea
Councilors	Gannaban, Gilbert

Members of the Municipal Council (2013–2016)

Position	Name
Congressman	Baby Aline Vargas-Alfonso
Mayor	Joel A. Ruma
Vice-Mayor	Johnas Ruma

Members of the Municipal Council (2010–2013)

Positions	Name
Congressman	vacant
Mayor	Joel A. Ruma
Vice-mayor	Johnas Ruma
Councilors	Simon,Graciano
Councilors	Favor, Jodilyn
Councilors	Talang,Luciano
Councilors	Littaua, Marivic
Councilors	Dela Cruz, Jose
Councilors	Aday, Bernabe,Jr.
Councilors	Anguluan, George
Councilors	Gannaban,Armando

== Education ==
The Schools Division of Cagayan governs the town's public education system. The division office is a field office of the DepEd in Cagayan Valley region. The Rizal Schools District Office governs the public and private elementary and high schools throughout the municipality.

=== Primary and elementary schools ===
- Cambabangan Elementary School
- Dungan Elementary School
- Duyun Elementary School
- Gaddangao Elementary School
- Gaggabutan Elementary School
- Illuru Elementary School
- Lattut Elementary School
- Liuan Elementary School
- Masi Elementary School
- Mauanan Elementary School
- Nanungaran Elementary School
- Rizal Central School
- San Juan Elementary School
- Sinicking Elementary School
- Villa Cruz Elementary School

=== Secondary schools ===
- Bural Integrated School
- Illuru National High School
- Mauanan National High School
- St. Francis Academy

== Tourism ==
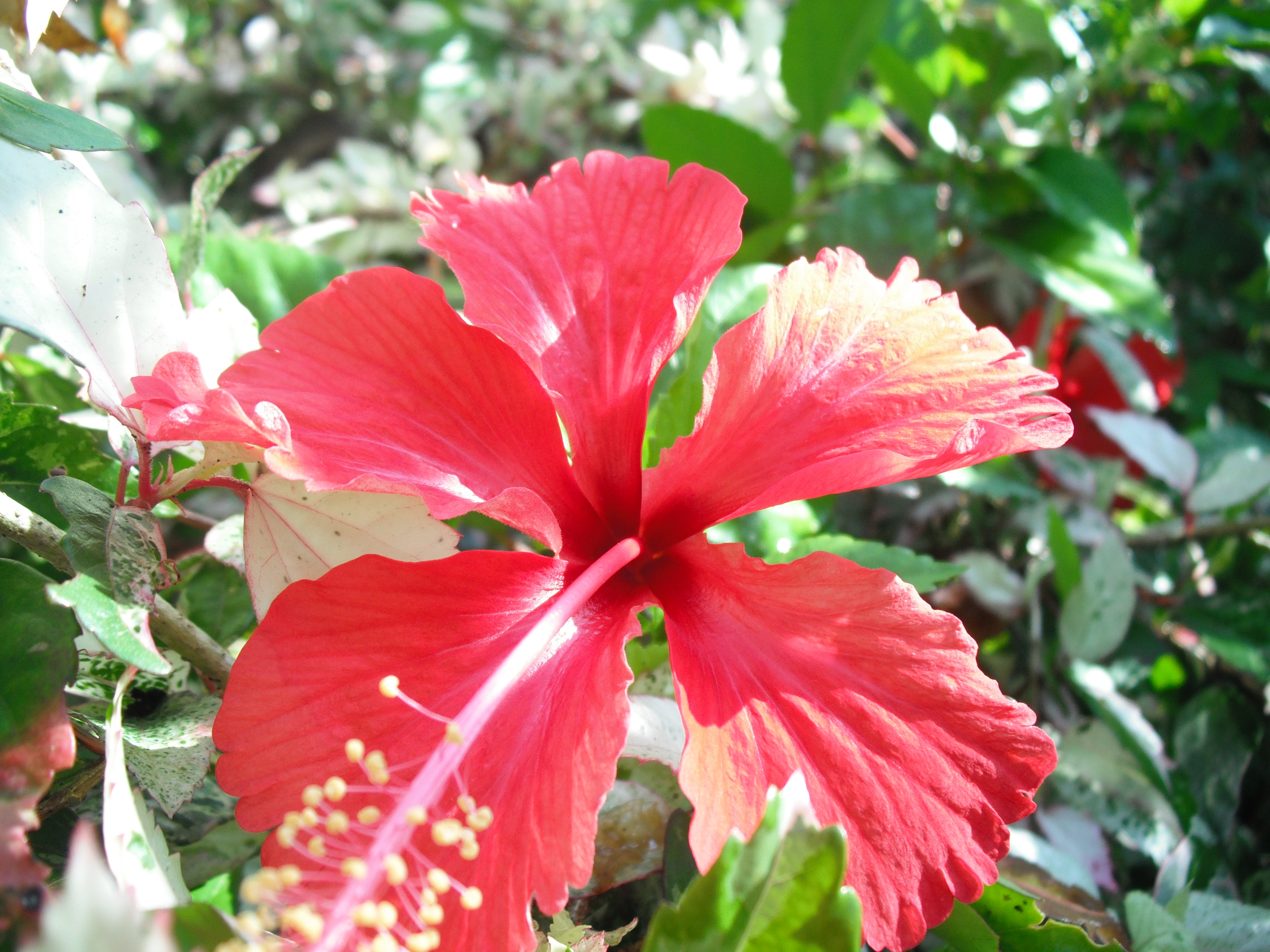
A Hibiscus flower in Rizal

The tourism development includes the Alsung Cave, the Sinicking National Park and Mount Annaguan forest reservations that will serve as the home for the rare species exclusively found in the area.

San Raimundo de Peñafort Church
The church, also known as Malaueg Church, was built in 1597. It was under the patronage of St. Raymond of Penyafort. The Dominican fathers accepted the ecclesiastical administration of this town on April 26, 1590. The cornerstone was laid November 26, 1597. The church and the convent have been destroyed and rebuilt four times. A site visited by Roman Catholic pilgrims, believed to show luck to the people in the certain town.
Mount Annaguan
The highest peak of the town that can view some places of the province of Cagayan.

== Infrastructure ==
The Cagayan–Apayao Road connects Rizal and nearby Conner to the neighboring towns of Tuao, Piat, Solana and Tuguegarao City. The 50 kilometres (31 mi) road from Tuao to Rizal is rough and can take up to one-half-hours. It will take another half-hour ride from Tuguegarao to Tuao.

The provincial road was opened in 1951. From 1951 to 1986, one had to cross the Matalag River with a ferry boat made out of bamboos and drum. The ferry boat loaded only one jeep or bus at a time. Traveling to Rizal from Tuao to Tuguegarao or vice versa in those days was slow and tiresome because it took the ferry boat almost an hour to ferry its load to and from the other side of the river. Vehicles were ferried on a first-come, first-served basis.

The roads to the town are along the edge of the mountain, having hairpin turns and in other barangays, the road is at the edge of the Matalag River and some are at the middle of the fields.

The following bus lines serve Rizal:

- Malaueg Bus Lines
- Duyun Lines
- Zinundungan Traveler
