= Itawes people =

Total population
- 189,000

Regions with significant populations
- Philippines: (Cagayan Valley)

Languages
- Itawes, Ibanag, Ilocano, Filipino, English

Religion
- Christianity (Predominantly Roman Catholic, with a minority of Protestants)

Related ethnic groups
- Ibanag, Gaddang, Ilocano, other Filipinos

The Itawes, Itawis, Hitawit or Itawit (endonym) are an indigenous peoples in the Cagayan Valley of northern Luzon, Philippines. Their name is derived from the Itawes prefix i- meaning "people of" and tawid or "across the river".

The Itawes are among the earliest inhabitants of the Cagayan Valley. Other than their mother tongue (categorized as closely related to Gaddang), they speak Ibanag and Ilocano. They are not very different from other lowland Christianized Filipino ethnic groups in terms of livelihood, housing, and traditions. Their traditional dresses are colorful with red being the dominant color. Farming is a leading source of livelihood. The average families are education-conscious.
