= List of historical markers of the Philippines in Cagayan Valley =

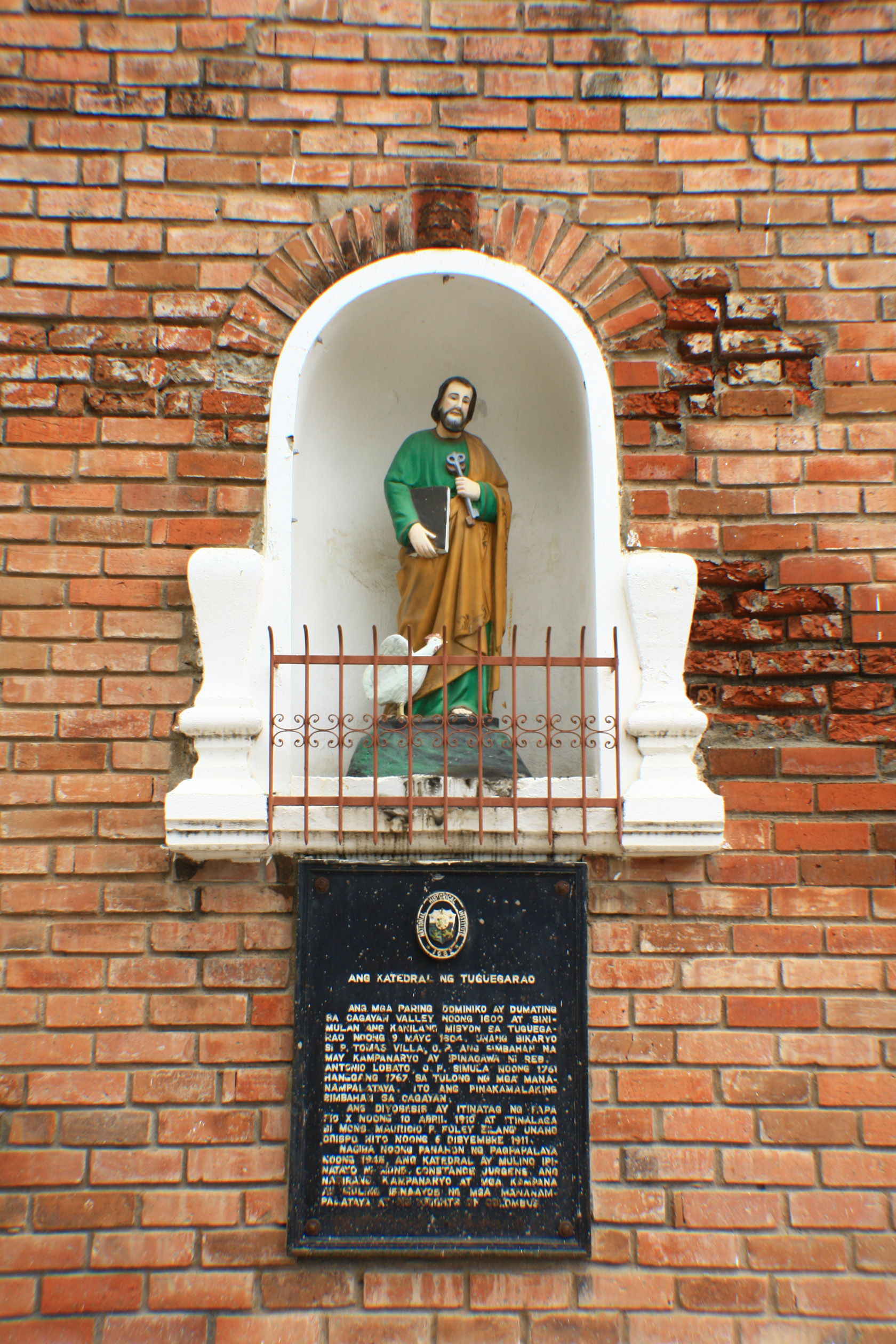
Marker for the Tuguegarao Cathedral in Tuguegarao, Cagayan

This list of historical markers installed by the National Historical Commission of the Philippines (NHCP) in Cagayan Valley (Region II) is an annotated list of people, places, or events in the region that have been commemorated by cast-iron plaques issued by the said commission. The plaques themselves are permanent signs installed in publicly visible locations on buildings, monuments, or in special locations.

While many Cultural Properties have historical markers installed, not all places marked with historical markers are designated into one of the particular categories of Cultural Properties.

This article lists 37 markers from the Cagayan Valley region.

== Batanes ==
This table lists twelve markers from the province of Batanes.

Marker title	Description	Location	Language	Date issued	Image
Andres Bonifacio	Founder of the Katipunan and leader of the Philippine Revolution.	Ivana	Filipino	2014	
Batanes Bisumi Fighters (1944)	Resistance against the Japanese, named after the six towns of Batanes: Basco, Ivana, Sabtang, Uyugan, Mahatao, and Itbayat.	Sabtang	Filipino	2014	
Batanes High School	Founded in 1917 for the secondary education of the people of Batanes.	Batanes National Science High School, Basco	Filipino	2014	
Casa Real	First built by the Spanish out of wood in the 18th century, served as the seat of the leaders of Batanes until today.	Basco		2014	
Jose Rizal	National hero of the Philippines	Basco	Filipino	2014	
Kenan, Aman Dangat "Buenaventura"	Ivatan martyr who revolted against Spanish rule. He was executed during the last days of September 1791.	Basco	English	June 26, 1999	
Kenan Aman Dangat	Ivatan martyr who revolted against Spanish rule. He was executed during the last days of September 1791.	Basco	Filipino	2014	
Simbahan ng Basco (Note: Basco Church)	First built in 1783. Made into a stone structure, 1795.	Basco	Filipino	March 27, 2008	
Simbahan ng Itbayat (Note: Itbayat Church)	First church built between 1853 and 1858.	Itbayat	Filipino	March 27, 2008	
Simbahan ng Ivana (Note: Ivana Church)	First chapel established in 1787.	Ivana	Filipino	2008	
Simbahan ng Sabtang (Note: Sabtang Church)	First chapel built by the Dominicans in 1785. Renovated between 1983 and 1984.	Sabtang	Filipino	2008	
Simbahan ng Mahatao (Note: Mahatao Church)	Established in 1787 under the patronage of San Carlos Borromeo. Katipunan flag was raised on September 19, 1898.	Mahatao	Filipino		

== Cagayan ==
This table lists 17 markers from the province of Cagayan.

Marker title	Description	Location	Language	Date issued	Image
Bayan ng Sto. Niño (Note: Town of Sto. Niño)	First established in 1891 by Manuel Faire. Formally established under the patronage of Santo. Niño on November 27, 1897.	Sto. Niño	Filipino	May 15, 1991	
Church of Camalaniugan	The ecclesiastical administration of this town was given to the Dominicans on June 15, 1696	Camalaniugan Church, Camalaniugan	English	1939	
Church of Malaueg	Cornerstone of the early church was laid on April 26, 1608. Church and convent rebuilt four times.	Church of Malaueg, Rizal	English	1939	
Cathedral of Tuguegarao	Present church and bell tower were constructed from 1761 to 1766. Diocese of Tuguegarao was created on April 10, 1910 by Pope Pius X.	Tuguegarao City	English	1939	
Church of Pamplona	Constructed in 1614. Municipalities of Abulacan and Massi merged in 1842 to become Pamplona.	Pamplona	English		
Diocese of Nueva Segovia	Founded on August 14, 1599. First seat in Lal-loc. Used as a garrison by American forces.	Lal-lo	English	1939	
Fort Lalloc	Built for the protection of the City of Nueva Segovia/Lal-lo. Had powder and ammunition magazines.	Lal-lo	English	1938	
Jose Rizal (1861–1896)	Philippine national hero.	Rizal Monument, Rizal Park, Tuguegarao City	Filipino	June 19, 2023	
Kapilya ng San Jacinto (Note: Chapel of San Jacinto)	Built by Dominicans in 1604. Became a station for both Filipino and American forces during the Filipino-American War.	San Jacinto, Tuguegarao City	Filipino	1982	
Ang Katedral ng Tuguegarao (Note: The Cathedral of Tuguegarao)	Commemoration of the arrival of the Dominicans in the region in 1800.	Tuguegarao City	Filipino, English	July 15, 1982	
Lalloc–Nueva Segovia	Named as Nueva Segovia by Juan Pablo Carrion in 1581. Visited by Juan Salcedo in 1572 and Luis Pérez Dasmariñas in 1592.	Lal-lo	English	1939	
Lalloc–Tocolana	Site of former church of Tocolana, when Lalloc had three parishes	Lal-lo	English	1939	
Parola ng Cape Engaño (Note: Cape Engaño Lighthouse)	Design by engineer Magin Pers y Pers. Construction commenced on September 21, 1888.	Palaui Island, Santa Ana	Filipino	2009	
St. Paul University; Tuguegarao City	Founded by the Sisters of St. Paul of Chartres (SPC) in 1907.	Tuguegarao City	Filipino	February 11, 2014	
Simbahan ng Camalaniugan (Note: Camalaniugan Church)	Acceptance of the ecclesiastical administration of Camalaniugan on June 15, 1596.	Camalaniugan Church facade, Camalaniugan	English	2008	
Simbahan ng Iguig (Note: Iguig Church)	Town founded on December 28, 1607. Church and convent built from 1765 to 1787.	Iguig	English	1939	
Ang Simbahan ng Pata (Note: The Church of Pata)	Built by the Dominicans on June 15, 1595. Established by Father Miguel de San Jacinto and Gaspar Zarpate.	Namoac, Sanchez-Mira	Filipino	March 18, 1981	

== Isabela ==
This table lists six markers from the province of Isabela.

Marker title	Description	Location	Language	Date issued	Image
Capture of General Aguinaldo Palanan, Isabela	Site of the house where the capture of Aguinaldo took effect.	Palanan	English		
Capture of General Aguinaldo	Site of the house where the capture of Aguinaldo took effect.	Palanan	English	1962	
Fernando M. Maramag	Skilled editorialist during his time. One of the first Filipinos who became expert on the English language.	Ilagan City	Filipino	January 21, 1983	
Fort Cabagan	Former site of Fort Cabagan. Fort was transferred to Cavicunga after and earthquake.	Cabagan Municipal Hall, Cabagan	English	1938	
Pagdakip kay Heneral Emilio Aguinaldo (Note: Capture of General Emilio Aguinaldo)	Site of the house where Aguinaldo was captured by the Americans under the command of Brigadier General Frederick Funston on March 23, 1901.	Palanan	Filipino	2001	
Church of Tumauini (English plaque) Ang Simbahan ng Tumauini (Filipino plaque)	First built of light materials in 1707. Exhibits the only cylindrical belltower in the Philippines.	Tumauini	Filipino, English	February 24, 1989	

== Nueva Vizcaya ==
This table lists two markers from the province of Nueva Vizcaya.

Marker title	Description	Location	Language	Date issued	Image
Jose Rizal	National hero	Brgy. Casat, Bayombong		June 18, 2011	
Labanan sa Pasong Balete (Note: Battle of Balete Pass)	Battle fought between Americans and the Japanese to control Cagayan Valley.	Dalton Pass, Santa Fe	Filipino	May 13, 2005	

== Quirino ==
There are no markers from the province of Quirino.

== See also ==
- List of Cultural Properties of the Philippines in Cagayan Valley

== Bibliography ==
- National Historical Institute (1993). Historical Markers: Regions I-IV and CAR. National Historical Institute.
- National Historical Institute (2008). Historical Markers (1992 - 2006). National Historical Institute.
- A list of sites and structures with historical markers, as of 16 January 2012
- A list of institutions with historical markers, as of 16 January 2012
