= List of Cultural Properties of the Philippines in Cagayan Valley =

This list contains an overview of the government recognized Cultural Properties of the Philippines in Cagayan Valley. The list is based on the official lists provided by the National Commission on Culture and the Arts, National Historical Commission of the Philippines and the National Museum of the Philippines.

Cultural Property wmph identifier (Note: wmph is an internal identifier used by Wikimedia Philippines to identify the monument. This is not an official identifier, and only shown temporarily in the templates until the government creates an updated complete list.)	Site name	Description	Province	City or municipality	Address	Coordinates	Image
PH-02-0001	Basco Cathedral		Batanes	Basco		20°27′03″N 121°58′11″E	Upload file
PH-02-0002	Itbayat Church		Batanes	Itbayat			Upload file
PH-02-0003	Ivana Church		Batanes	Ivana			Upload file
PH-02-0004	Mahatao Church	San Carlos Borromeo Church.	Batanes	Mahatao	National Rd.	20°24′55″N 121°56′51″E	Upload file
PH-02-0005	Sabtang Church, Convent and Beaterio		Batanes	Sabtang			Upload file
PH-02-0006	Camalaniugan Church		Cagayan	Camalaniugan		18°16′17″N 121°40′32″E	Upload Photo
PH-02-0007	Nueva Segovia Church		Cagayan	Lal-lo		18°11′58″N 121°39′41″E	Upload file
PH-02-0008	Cape Engaño Lighthouse		Cagayan	Palaui Island, Santa Ana		18°34′47″N 122°08′15″E	More images
PH-02-0009	Tuguegarao City Cathedral	Saint Peter Metropolitan Cathedral Parish	Cagayan	Tuguegarao City	Rizal Street	17°36′47″N 121°43′50″E	Upload file
PH-02-0010	Iguig Church		Cagayan	Iguig	Iguig Calvary Hills	17°45′02″N 121°44′04″E	More images
PH-02-0011	Pata Church Ruins		Cagayan	Sanchez-Mira	Sitio Nagsimbaanan, Brgy. Namuac		Upload file
PH-02-0012	Pamplona Church	St. Peter the Martyr Parish Church	Cagayan	Pamplona		18°27′49″N 121°20′22″E	Upload file
PH-02-0013	Malaueg Church	St. Raymond of Penyafort Parish Church	Cagayan	Rizal		17°50′41″N 121°20′43″E	More images
PH-02-0014	Ermita de San Jacinto Parish	San Jacinto Church	Cagayan	Tuguegarao City	Mabini Street	17°37′00″N 121°43′30″E	Upload file
PH-02-0015	Tumauini Church		Isabela	Tumauini		17°16′31″N 121°48′26″E	More images
PH-02-0016	Jose Rizal Monument		Nueva Vizcaya	Bayombong	La Torre–Casat Road	16°31′04″N 121°08′34″E	Upload Photo
PH-02-0017	Dupax del Sur Church	San Vicente de Ferrer Parish	Nueva Vizcaya	Dupax del Sur	Km. 244 Aritao–Quirino Road	16°17′05″N 121°05′29″E	More images
PH-02-0018	Ruins of Santa Ines de Montepulciano Church		Cagayan	Santo Niño	Brgy. Tabang, Santo Niño, Cagayan	17°49′07″N 121°32′59″E	Upload Photo

== See also ==
- List of historical markers of the Philippines in Cagayan Valley
