= Pamplona Church =

Roman Catholic church in Cagayan, Philippines

- Saint Peter the Martyr and John Nepomuceno Parish Church
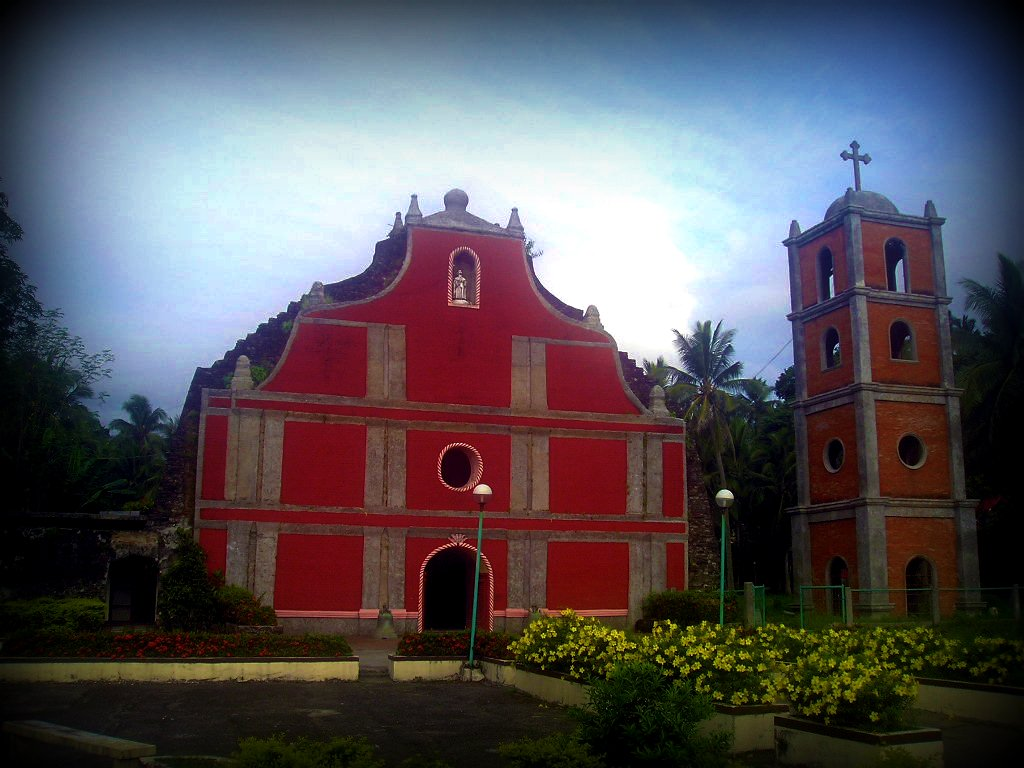
- The church's facade

- Location in Luzon Location in the Philippines
- 18°27′49″N 121°20′22″E
- Location: Centro, Pamplona, Cagayan
- Country: Philippines
- Denomination: Roman Catholic

History
- Status: Parish church
- Dedication: Peter Martyr and John Nepomucene

Architecture
- Functional status: Active
- Heritage designation: National Historical Landmark
- Designated: 1939
- Architectural type: Church building
- Completed: 1617; 409 years ago

Administration
- Archdiocese: Tuguegarao

Saint Peter the Martyr and John Nepomuceno Parish Church, commonly known as Pamplona Church, is a Roman Catholic church located in Pamplona, Cagayan, Philippines. It is under the jurisdiction of the Archdiocese of Tuguegarao.

Pamplona Church is the oldest standing church in Cagayan. Originally called Masi Church, its construction started in 1614 and was finished in 1617. The church was damaged in 1721 by earthquakes and was subsequently repaired.

The National Historical Commission of the Philippines declared it a national historical landmark in 1939.
