= Cagayan Valley =

Administrative region of the Philippines

Cagayan Valley Tanap ti Cagayan
- Region
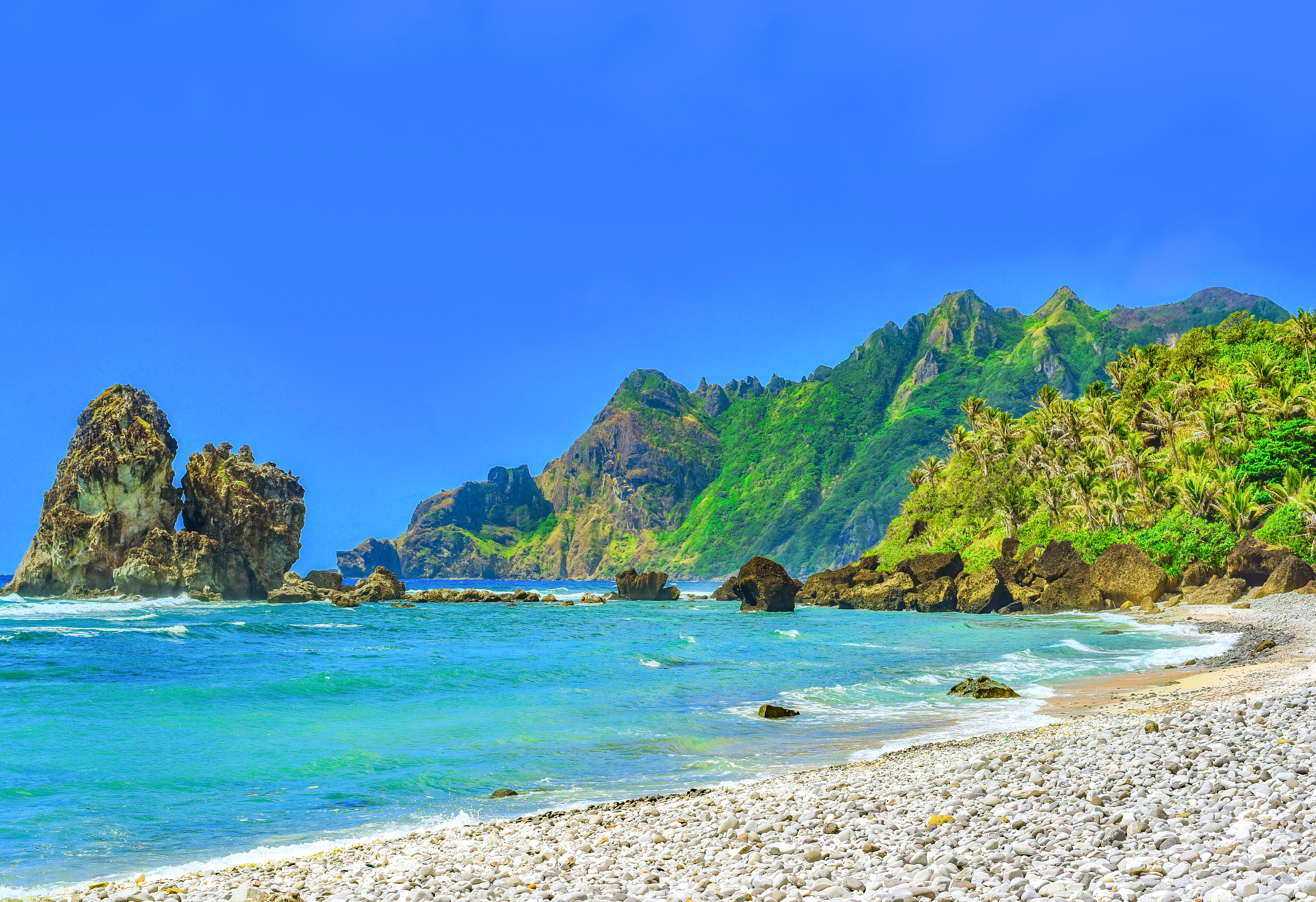
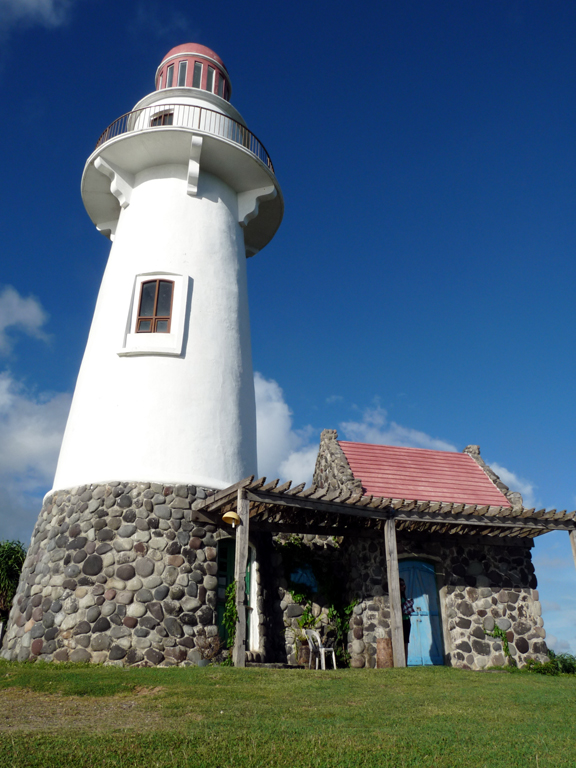
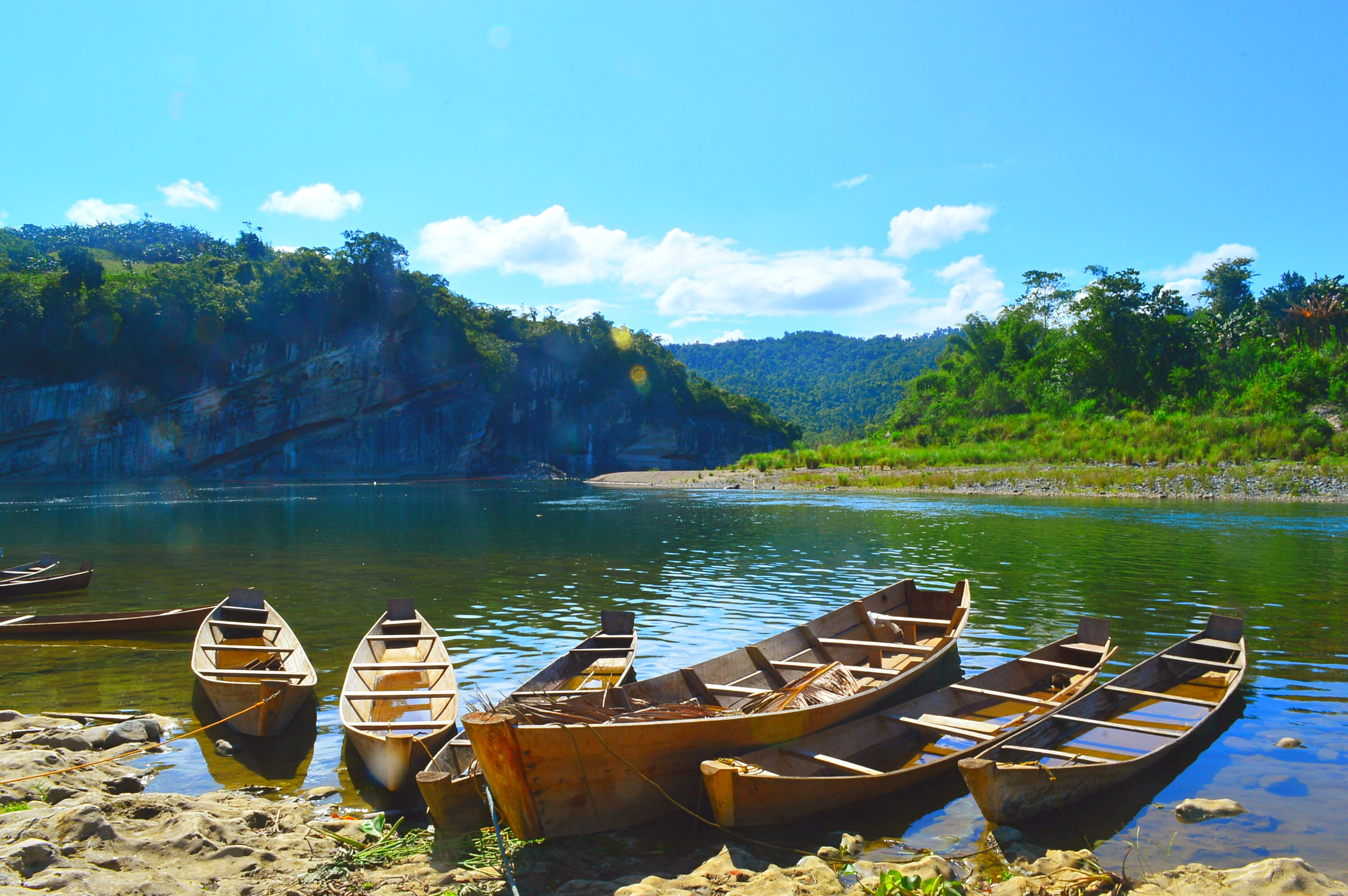
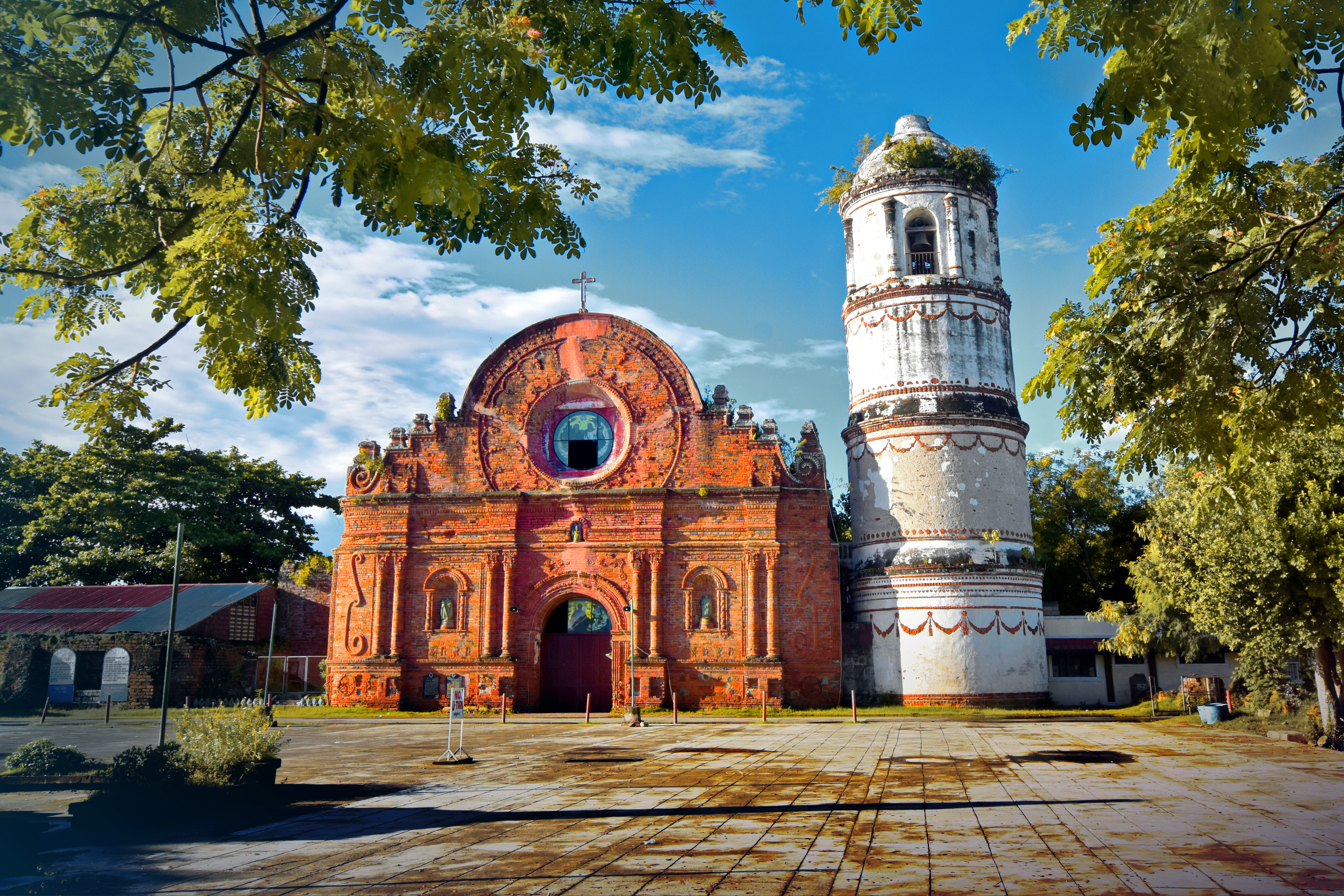
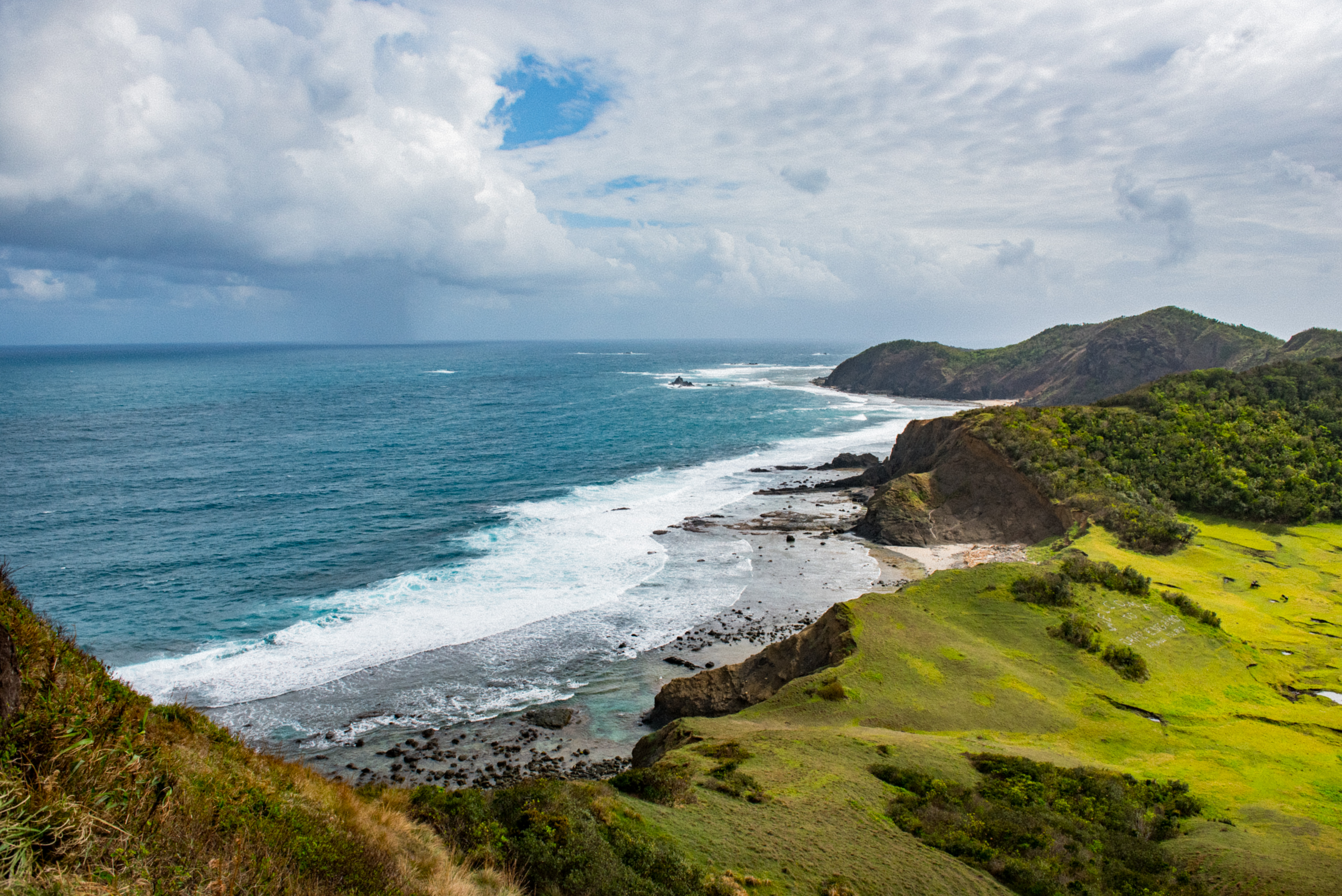
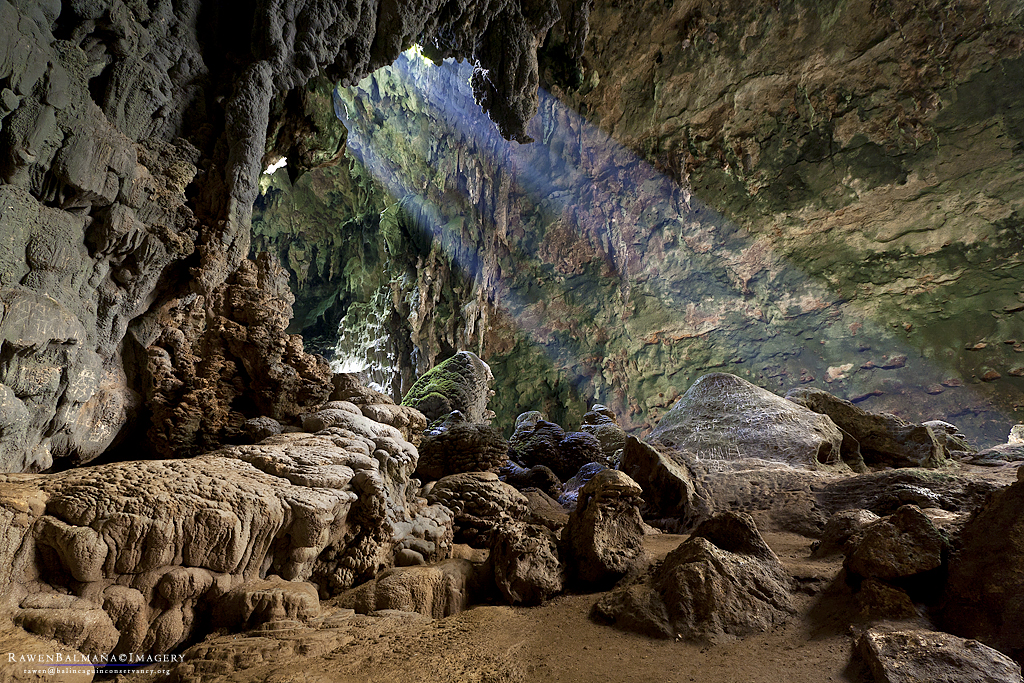
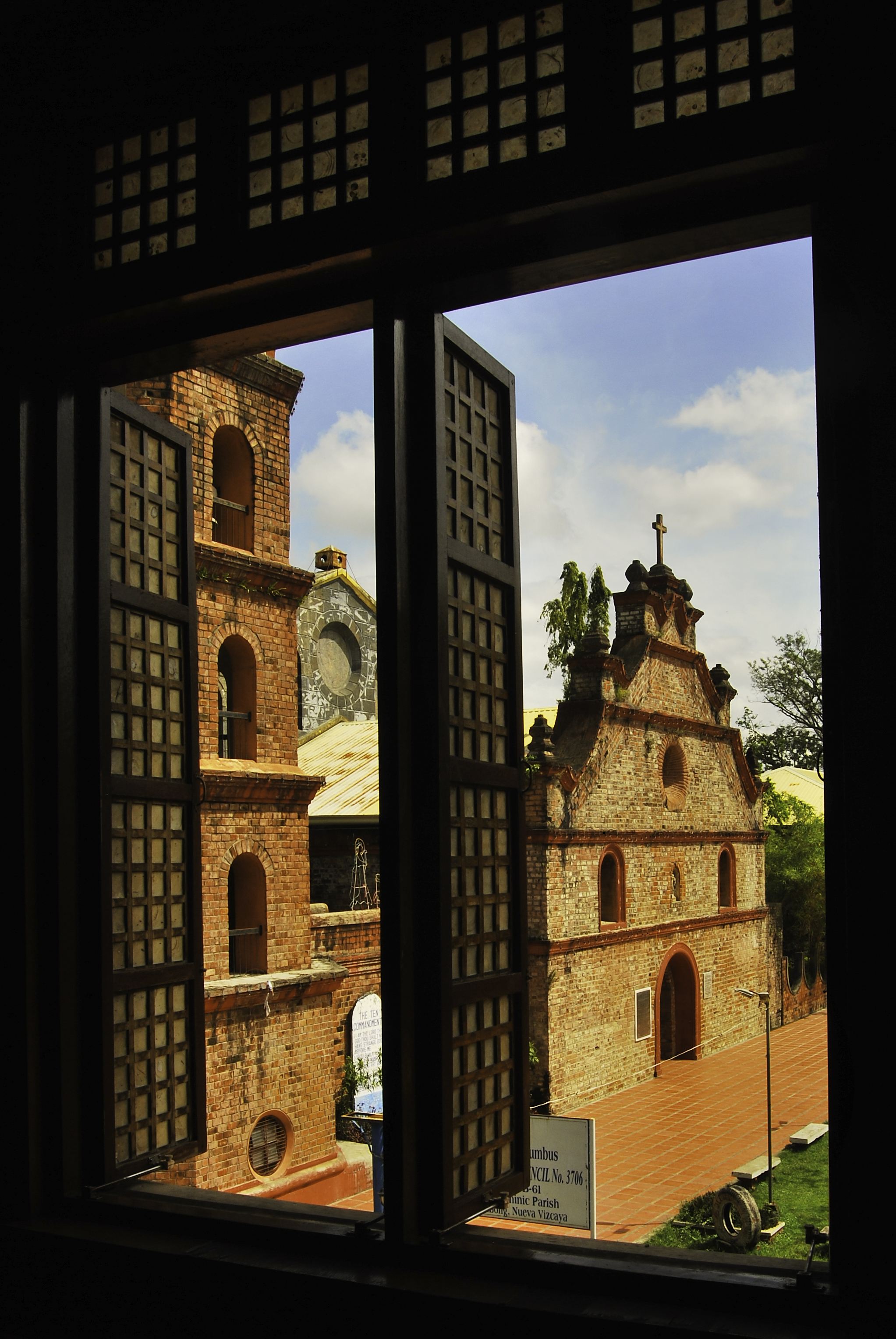
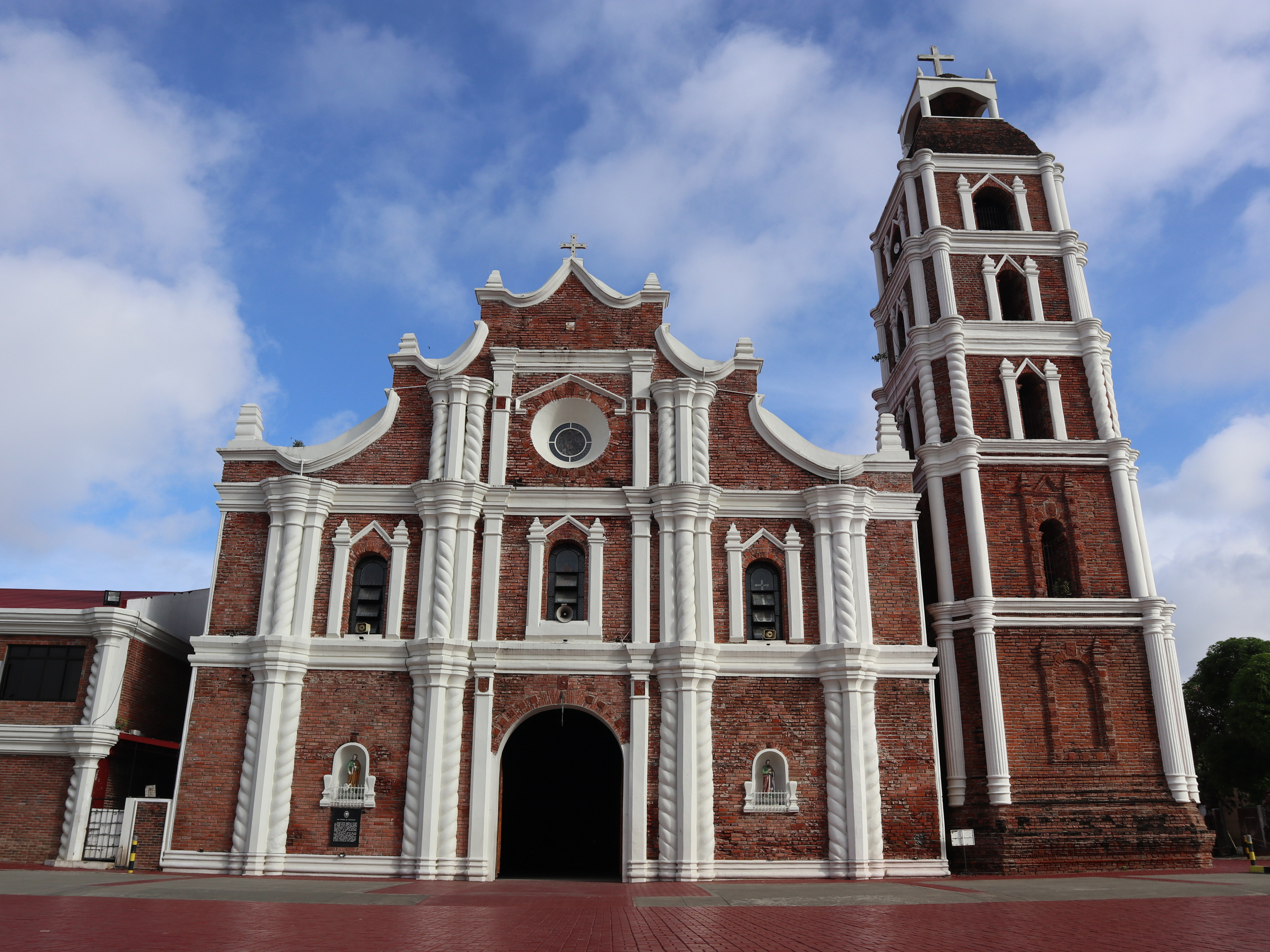
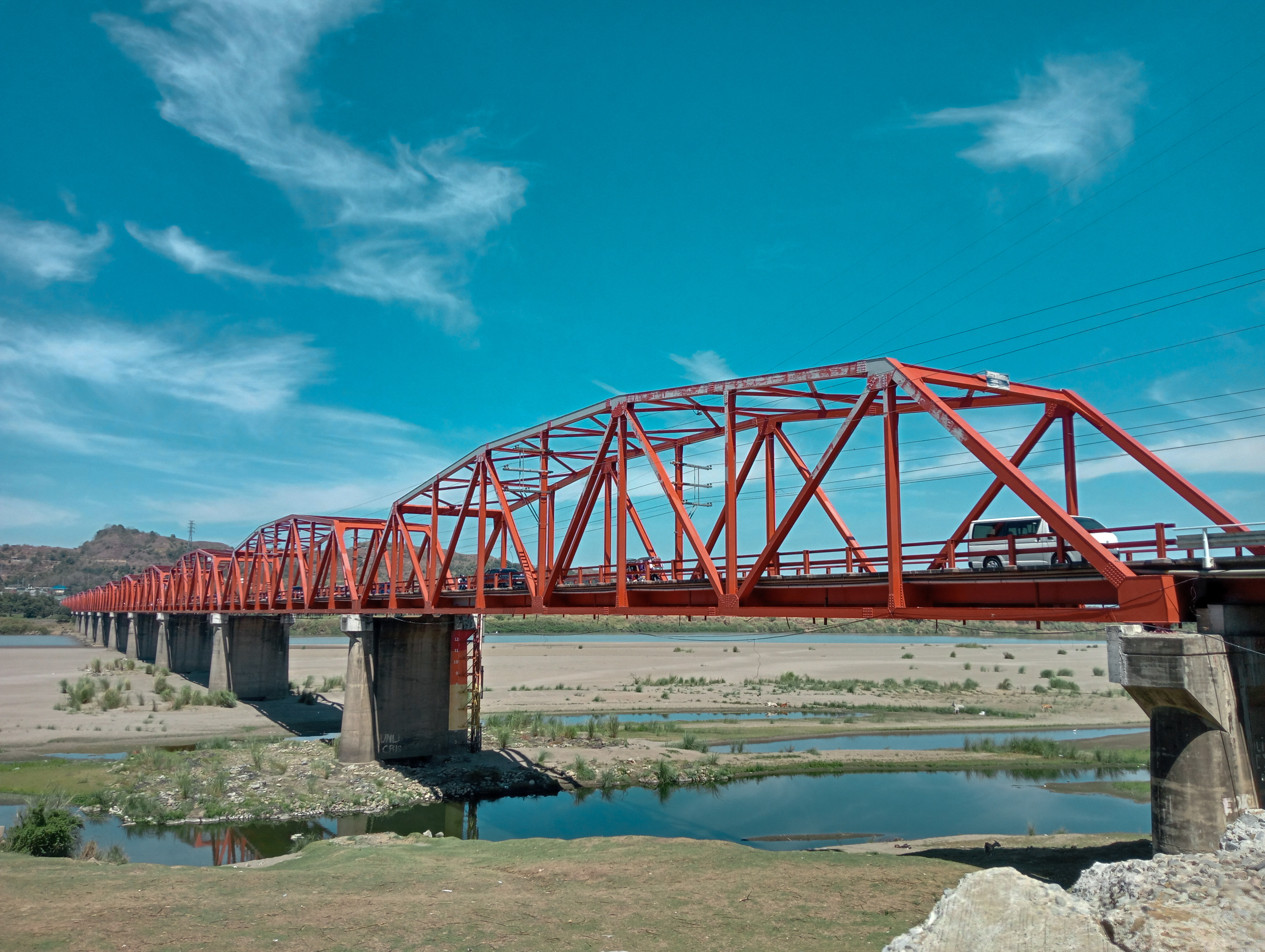
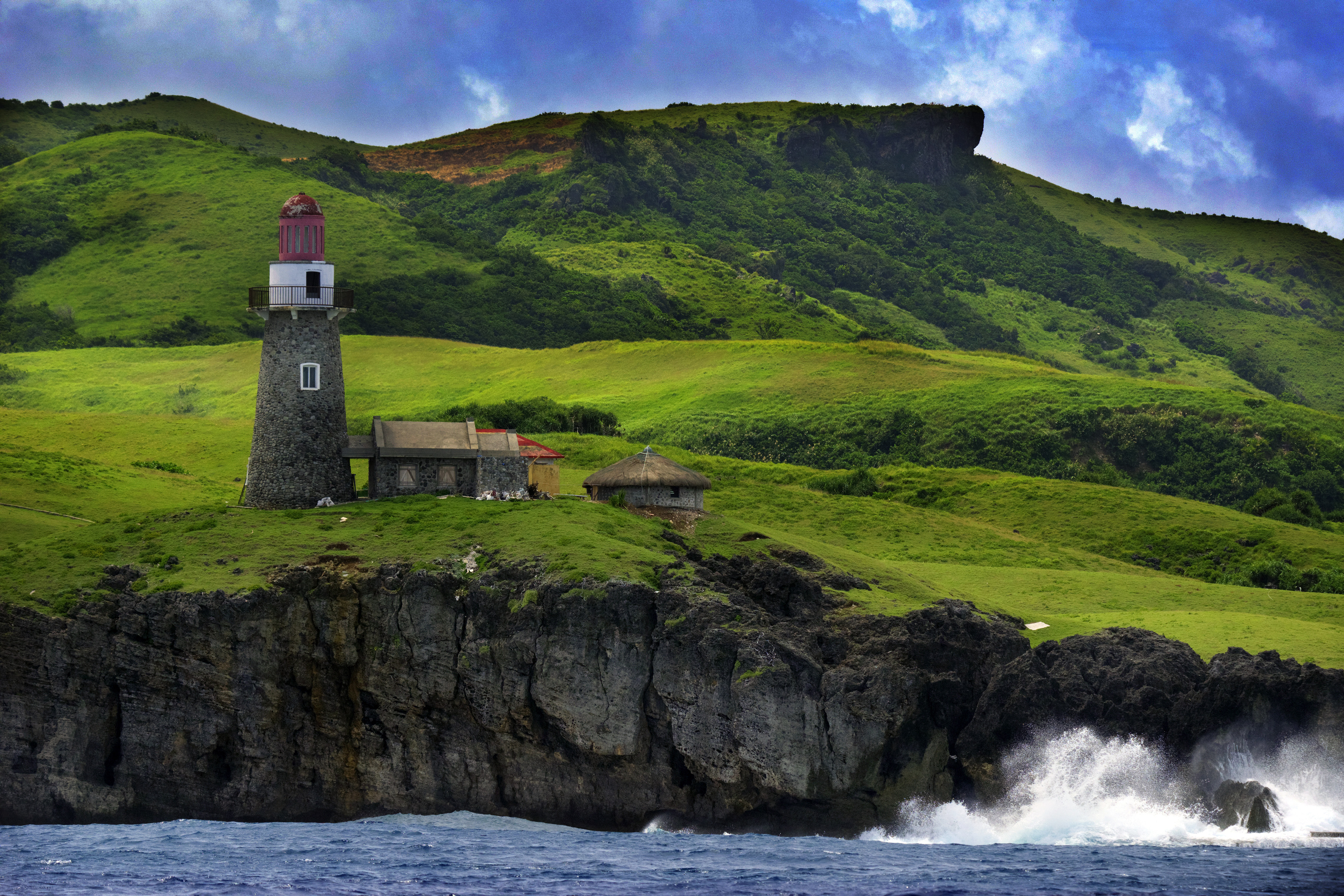
- Clockwise from the top: Sabtang Beach, Governor's Rapids, Palaui Island, Bayombong Cathedral, Buntun Bridge, Sabtang Island, Tuguegarao Cathedral, Callao Cave, Tumauini Church, and Basco Lighthouse.
- Anthem: Himig ng Rehiyong Dalawa
- Location in the Philippines
- Interactive map of Cagayan Valley
- Country: Philippines
- Island group: Luzon
- Regional center and largest city: Tuguegarao

Area
  - Total: 28,228.83 km^{2} (10,899.21 sq mi)
- Highest elevation (Mount Pulag): 2,928 m (9,606 ft)

Population (2024 census)
  - Total: 3,777,608
  - Density: 133.8209/km^{2} (346.5946/sq mi)
  - Households: 907,472

Divisions
  - Provinces: 5: Batanes; Cagayan; Isabela; Nueva Vizcaya; Quirino
  - Independent component city: 1: Santiago
  - Component cities: 3: Cauayan; Ilagan; Tuguegarao
  - Municipalities: 89
  - Barangays: 2,311
  - Districts: 12

Economy
  - Poverty incidence: 4.4% (2025)
  - GDP total: US$9.9 billion (2024)
  - GDP per capita: US$2,606
  - HDI (2023): 0.728 high · 5th of 17
- Time zone: UTC+8 (PST)
- PSGC: 020000000
- ISO 3166 code: PH-02
- Electorate: 2,358,587 voters (2025)
- Languages: Ilocano; Ibanag; Ivatan; Itawis; Gaddang; Yogad; Isinay; Isnag; Ilongot; Pangasinan; Tagalog; English; others

Cagayan Valley (Ilocano: Tanap ti Cagayan; Ibanag: Tana' na Cagayan; Filipino: Lambak ng Cagayan; Spanish: Valle del Cagayán), designated as Region II, is an administrative region in the Philippines. Located in the northeastern section of Luzon, it is composed of five Philippine provinces: Batanes, Cagayan, Isabela, Nueva Vizcaya, and Quirino. The region hosts four chartered cities: Cauayan, Ilagan, Santiago (an independent component city), and Tuguegarao (the regional center and largest city).

Most of its land area lies in the valley between the Cordilleras and the Sierra Madre mountain ranges. The eponymous Cagayan River, the country's largest and longest, runs through the region, flows from the Caraballo Mountains, and ends in Aparri. Cagayan Valley is the second-largest Philippine administrative region by land area. According to a literacy survey in 2019, 93% of Cagayan Valley's citizens (ages 10 to 64) are functionally literate, which is 5th out of the 17 regions of the Philippines.

== History ==
=== Spanish colonial era ===
During the Spanish era, Cagayan Valley had a larger territory than today, then named Provincia de Cagayan. Then it included the territories of the above-mentioned provinces and the eastern parts of the Cordillera provinces of Apayao, Kalinga, Mountain Province, Ifugao and Benguet, and the north part of Aurora. Historian and missionary Jose Burgues said, "The old Cagayan Valley comprises the province of Cagayan, Isabela and Nueva Vizcaya as well as the military Districts of Apayao, Itaves, Quiangan, Cayapa and Bintangan, plus the area of the Sierra Madre to the Pacific Ocean in the said trajectory." The exception is Palanan, which was established in 1625 by Spanish forces who arrived by ship from the Pacific coastal town of Baler in Tayabas province (now part of Aurora). Thus, Palanan was originally a part of Pampanga, then to Laguna, Tayabas (now Quezon Province; Tayabas became independent from Laguna), and Nueva Ecija, before being transferred to Nueva Vizcaya and finally Isabela. Also, unlike the rest of Cagayan Valley, it was served by Franciscan missionaries from Baler rather than the Dominicans. The population of the town was natively Paranan, then subsequently augmented by local Negritos, migrants from Baler who are Tagalogs and outlaws from Cagayan Valley, with the lingua franca of the settlement being Tagalog as opposed to Ilocano or Ibanag. The Atta or Negritos, the first people in valley, were later moved to the uplands or variably assimilated by the Austronesians, from whom the Ibanags, Itawes, Yogads, Gaddangs, Irayas, Malawegs, and Paranans descended – who actually came from one ethnicity. These are the people found by the Spaniards in the different villages along the rivers all over Cagayan Valley. The Spaniards rightly judged that these various villagers came from a single racial stock and decided to make the Ibanag language the lingua franca, both civilly and ecclesiastically for the entire people of Cagayan which they called collectively as the Cagayanes which later was transliterated to become Cagayanos. Various other peoples, mainly the Ilocanos, Pangasinenses, Kapampangans and Tagalogs, as well as Visayans, Moros, Ivatans, and even foreigners like the Chinese, Indians, Arabs, Spaniards and others were further infused to the native Cagayanes to become the modern Cagayano that we know today. In 1818, Nueva Ecija annexed the towns of Palanan from Isabela, as well as Cagayan, Nueva Vizcaya, Quirino, Baler, Casiguran, Infanta (formerly called Binangonan de Lampon) and Polillo Islands from Tayabas, and part of Rizal. In the nineteenth and 20th centuries, the prosperity found in tobacco cultivation caused many Ilokano people to settle here, it was only in this large-scale Ilocano settlement that made Ilocano language replace Ibanag as the lingua franca of the region. Ilocano settlers already migrated to Nueva Vizcaya (including present-day Quirino) earlier in 1700s also to work on the tobacco plantations, and later immigrants with skills construct churches and other structures needed for development, as the native Igorot tribes rejected labor imposed by the Spaniards. Tobacco is still a major factor in the economy of Cagayan, though a special economic zone and free port has been created to strengthen and diversify the provincial economy.

=== During World War II ===
During World War II, at Balete Pass in Nueva Vizcaya, the retreating Japanese Imperial Army under General Tomoyuki Yamashita dug in and held on for three months against the American and Filipino forces who eventually drove them out; the pass is now called Dalton Pass in honor of General Dalton, USA, who was killed in the fighting.

=== Martial Law era ===
Loan-funded government spending to promote Ferdinand Marcos' 1969 reelection campaign caused the Philippine economy to take a sudden downwards turn in the form of the 1969 Philippine balance of payments crisis, which in turn led to social unrest throughout the country. Cagayan Valley became one of the flashpoints of conflict, with many previously-moderate young people joining the armed resistance against Marcos after being radicalized by various crackdowns.

With only a year left in his last constitutionally allowed term as president, Ferdinand Marcos placed the Philippines under Martial Law in September 1972 and thus retained the position for fourteen more years. This period in Philippine history is remembered for the Marcos administration's record of human rights abuses, particularly targeting political opponents, student activists, journalists, religious workers, farmers, and others who fought against the Marcos dictatorship.

In Isabela, protests erupted when Marcos crony Danding Cojuangco managed to block a Spanish-era grant which was supposed to see the return of Hacienda San Antonio and Hacienda Santa Isabel in Ilagan to local farmers, displacing tens of thousands of farmers who were supposed to get those lands back a hundred years after the Spanish accosted them. The Roman Catholic Diocese of Ilagan led efforts to support the farmers in their cause, succeeding in forcing the Marcos administration to finally concede land titles to 4,000 farmers, but earning the ire of the dicatatorship against leading church figures such as Ilagan Bishop Miguel Purugganan, Diocesan Social Action Center researcher Sabino "Abe" Padilla, and the various nuns and lay workers of the Diocese.

Also during that time, logging concessions were awarded to Juan Ponce Enrile, Herminio Disini, and other cronies, leading to the severe degradation of forest cover in the region, which contributed to widespread flooding and other environmental issues that persist today.

==== Integration of new provinces ====
Kalinga-Apayao and Ifugao were transferred to the Cagayan Valley region in 1972, and afterwards Ferdinand Marcos imposed a migration policy for Ilokanos into those provinces; the natives of Apayao called Isnag become minority there.

=== Later 20th Century ===
After the People Power Revolution in 1986, many of the activists who had joined the underground movement against Marcos decided to "surface", as the new administration of Corazon Aquino released political prisoners and initiated peace talks. However, anti-left sentiment in her new cabinet, which included individuals who had aligned themselves with the Reform the Armed Forces Movement, made the peace process difficult. Negotiations eventually collapsed, and unrest in Cagayan valley persisted.

When the Cordillera Administrative Region was formed in 1987 under Corazon Aquino, the indigenous provinces of Ifugao and Kalinga-Apayao (later divided into the provinces of Kalinga and Apayao) were transferred into the newly formed region.

=== Contemporary history ===
==== COVID-19 pandemic ====
During the worldwide COVID-19 pandemic, the severe acute respiratory syndrome coronavirus 2 (SARS-CoV-2) virus reached Cagayan Valley on March 21, 2020, when the first case of the disease was confirmed in Tuguegarao. All provinces have confirmed at least one COVID-19 case, with Batanes being the last province to confirm a COVID-19 case on September 28, 2020.

==== Extreme climate events ====
In November 2020, Typhoon Vamco (known in the Philippines as Typhoon Ulysses) crossed the island of Luzon, causing dam operators from all around the island to release large amounts of water into their impounds as they neared their spilling points. All seven of Magat Dam's gates were opened to prevent dam failure, but the overflow into the Cagayan River and caused widespread floods in Cagayan and Isabela. This event was worsened by the information gap that had developed as a result of the recent shutdown of the ABS-CBN broadcast network, because those areas had previously gotten weather updates primarily from the said network.

== Geography ==
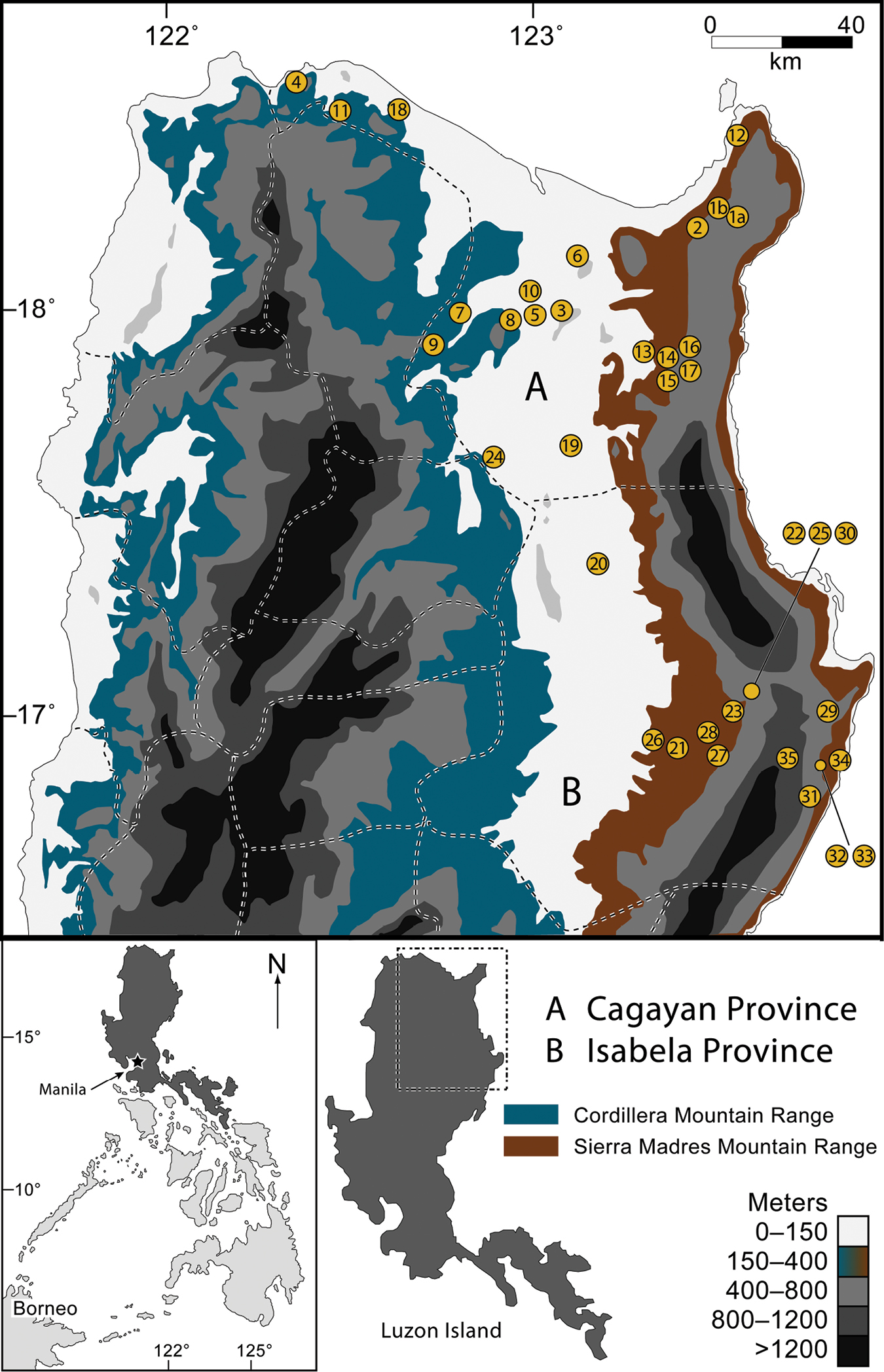
Northern Luzon topography showing Cagayan Valley

Cagayan Valley is the large mass of land in the northeastern region of Luzon, comprising the provinces of Cagayan, Isabela, Nueva Vizcaya, Quirino, and the Batanes group of islands. It is bordered to the west by the Cordillera mountain range, to the east by the Sierra Madre, to the south by the Caraballo Mountains, and to the north by the Luzon Strait. Politically, it is bordered by the Cordillera Administrative Region to the west, the Ilocos Region to the northwest and southwest, Central Luzon to the south, and Taiwan to the north which shares maritime border from Bashi Channel.

The region contains two landlocked provinces, Quirino and Nueva Vizcaya, which are ruggedly mountainous and heavily forested. Nueva Vizcaya is the remnant of the southern province created when Cagayan Province was divided in two in 1839. They are ethnically and linguistically diverse, with a substrate of Agtas, Negritos who are food-gatherers with no fixed abodes, overlaid by Ilongots and others in a number of tribes, some of whom were fierce head-hunters (they have given up the practice), with the latest but largest element of the population being the Ilocanos, closely followed by the Ibanags.

=== Administrative divisions ===
Cagayan Valley comprises five provinces, one independent city, three component cities, 89 municipalities, and 2,311 barangays.

==== Provinces ====
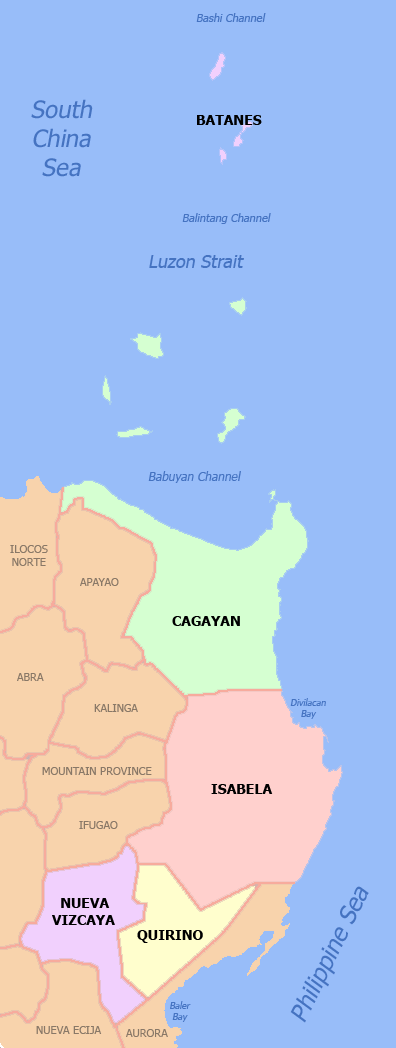
Political map of Cagayan Valley

Province	Capital	Largest settlement	Population (2024 census)		Area		Density		Cities	Muni.	Barangay
		Largest settlement			km^{2}	sq mi	/km^{2}	/sq mi			
Batanes	Basco		0.5%	18,937	219.01	84.56	86	220	0	6	29
Cagayan	Tuguegarao		34.0%	1,284,676	9,295.75	3,589.11	140	360	1	28	820
Isabela	Ilagan		45.9%	1,733,048	12,414.93	4,793.43	140	360	3	34	1,055
Nueva Vizcaya	Bayombong		14.0%	530,106	3,975.67	1,535.01	130	340	0	15	275
Quirino	Cabarroguis	Diffun	5.6%	210,841	3,323.47	1,283.20	63	160	0	6	132
Total				3,685,744	28,228.83	10,899.21	130	340	4	89	2,311
• Figures for Isabela include the independent component city of Santiago.

===== Governors and vice governors =====
Province	Image	Governor	Political Party	Vice Governor
Batanes		Ronald P. Aguto Jr.	PFP	Jonathan Enrique V. Nanud Jr.
Cagayan		Edgar B. Aglipay	Nacionalista	Manuel N. Mamba
Isabela		Rodolfo Albano III	PFP	Francis Faustino A. Dy
Nueva Vizcaya		Jose V. Gambito	PFP	Eufemia A. Dacayo
Quirino		Julius Caesar S. Vaquilar	PFP	Lillybeth H. Yogyog

==== Cities and Municipalities ====
- † Regional center

City/Municipality	Population (2024)	Area		Density		Class	Income class	Province
		km^{2}	sq mi	/km^{2}	/sq mi			
Abulug	35,347	162.60	62.78	220	570	Municipality	3rd	Cagayan
Aglipay	31,596	161.70	62.43	200	520	Municipality	3rd	Quirino
Alcala	41,468	187.20	72.28	220	570	Municipality	3rd	Cagayan
Alfonso Castañeda	8,933	375.40	144.94	24	62	Municipality	1st	Nueva Vizcaya
Alicia	74,699	154.10	59.50	480	1,200	Municipality	1st	Isabela
Allacapan	35,946	306.80	118.46	120	310	Municipality	3rd	Cagayan
Ambaguio	16,401	156.26	60.33	100	260	Municipality	5th	Nueva Vizcaya
Amulung	50,903	264.51	102.13	190	490	Municipality	2nd	Cagayan
Angadanan	68,368	204.40	78.92	330	850	Municipality	3rd	Isabela
Aparri	68,368	286.64	110.67	240	620	Municipality	1st	Cagayan
Aritao	45,000	265.60	102.55	170	440	Municipality	2nd	Nueva Vizcaya
Aurora	37,191	115.56	44.62	330	850	Municipality	3rd	Isabela
Bagabag	39,138	183.90	71.00	210	540	Municipality	2nd	Nueva Vizcaya
Baggao	90,723	920.60	355.45	99	260	Municipality	1st	Cagayan
Ballesteros	34,562	120.00	46.33	290	750	Municipality	4th	Cagayan
Bambang	60,146	345.00	133.21	170	440	Municipality	1st	Nueva Vizcaya
Basco	9,647	49.46	19.10	200	520	Municipality	5th	Batanes
Bayombong	72,890	136.00	52.51	540	1,400	Municipality	1st	Nueva Vizcaya
Benito Soliven	30,682	184.40	71.20	170	440	Municipality	4th	Isabela
Buguey	32,351	164.50	63.51	200	520	Municipality	3rd	Cagayan
Burgos	26,729	73.10	28.22	370	960	Municipality	4th	Isabela
Cabagan	55,445	430.40	166.18	130	340	Municipality	1st	Isabela
Cabarroguis	34,720	260.20	100.46	130	340	Municipality	3rd	Quirino
Cabatuan	40,223	72.00	27.80	560	1,500	Municipality	3rd	Isabela
Calayan	18,008	164.50	63.51	110	280	Municipality	3rd	Cagayan
Camalaniugan	25,629	76.50	29.54	340	880	Municipality	4th	Cagayan
Cauayan	143,539	336.40	129.88	430	1,100	Component city	2nd	Isabela
Claveria	32,997	194.80	75.21	170	440	Municipality	3rd	Cagayan
Cordon	46,688	144.00	55.60	320	830	Municipality	3rd	Isabela
Delfin Albano	30,860	189.00	72.97	160	410	Municipality	4th	Isabela
Diadi	20,438	181.20	69.96	110	280	Municipality	4th	Nueva Vizcaya
Diffun	58,254	320.10	123.59	180	470	Municipality	2nd	Quirino
Dinapigue	6,116	574.40	221.78	11	28	Municipality	1st	Isabela
Divilacan	5,871	889.49	343.43	6.6	17	Municipality	2nd	Isabela
Dupax del Norte	35,509	347.30	134.09	100	260	Municipality	3rd	Nueva Vizcaya
Dupax del Sur	22,388	374.70	144.67	60	160	Municipality	2nd	Nueva Vizcaya
Echague	91,320	680.80	262.86	130	340	Municipality	1st	Isabela
Enrile	36,481	184.50	71.24	200	520	Municipality	3rd	Cagayan
Gamu	30,850	129.40	49.96	240	620	Municipality	4th	Isabela
Gattaran	59,704	707.50	273.17	84	220	Municipality	1st	Cagayan
Gonzaga	41,994	567.43	219.09	74	190	Municipality	1st	Cagayan
Iguig	31,342	108.10	41.74	290	750	Municipality	4th	Cagayan
Ilagan	164,020	1,166.26	450.30	140	360	Component city	1st	Isabela
Itbayat	2,937	83.13	32.10	35	91	Municipality	5th	Batanes
Ivana	1,368	16.54	6.39	83	210	Municipality	6th	Batanes
Jones	46,160	670.14	258.74	69	180	Municipality	1st	Isabela
Kasibu	46845	318.80	123.09	150	390	Municipality	3rd	Nueva Vizcaya
Kayapa	27,865	482.90	186.45	58	150	Municipality	3rd	Nueva Vizcaya
Lal-lo	48,404	702.80	271.35	69	180	Municipality	1st	Cagayan
Lasam	42,042	213.70	82.51	200	520	Municipality	3rd	Cagayan
Luna	21,015	45.70	17.64	460	1,200	Municipality	5th	Isabela
Maconacon	4,252	538.66	207.98	7.9	20	Municipality	3rd	Isabela
Maddela	41,867	918.57	354.66	46	120	Municipality	1st	Quirino
Mahatao	1,745	12.90	4.98	140	360	Municipality	6th	Batanes
Mallig	32,509	133.40	51.51	240	620	Municipality	4th	Isabela
Nagtipunan	26,541	1,607.40	620.62	17	44	Municipality	1st	Quirino
Naguilian	34,520	169.81	65.56	39	100	Municipality	4th	Isabela
Palanan	18,091	880.24	339.86	21	54	Municipality	1st	Isabela
Pamplona	25,182	173.30	66.91	150	390	Municipality	4th	Cagayan
Peñablanca	50,856	1,193.20	460.70	43	110	Municipality	1st	Cagayan
Piat	25,436	139.60	53.90	180	470	Municipality	4th	Cagayan
Quezon	28,376	189.90	73.32	150	390	Municipality	4th	Isabela
Quezon	24,055	187.50	72.39	130	340	Municipality	4th	Nueva Vizcaya
Quirino	25,306	126.20	48.73	200	520	Municipality	4th	Isabela
Ramon	57,412	135.17	52.19	420	1,100	Municipality	2nd	Isabela
Reina Mercedes	28,222	57.14	22.06	490	1,300	Municipality	4th	Isabela
Rizal	19,577	124.40	48.03	160	410	Municipality	5th	Cagayan
Roxas	66,593	184.80	71.35	360	930	Municipality	1st	Isabela
Sabtang	1,774	40.70	15.71	44	110	Municipality	6th	Batanes
Saguday	17,863	55.50	21.43	320	830	Municipality	5th	Quirino
San Agustin	22,228	278.40	107.49	80	210	Municipality	3rd	Isabela
San Guillermo	21,043	325.49	125.67	65	170	Municipality	4th	Isabela
San Isidro	27,326	71.90	27.76	380	980	Municipality	5th	Isabela
San Manuel	34,740	112.77	43.54	310	800	Municipality	4th	Isabela
San Mariano	61,876	1,469.50	567.38	42	110	Municipality	1st	Isabela
San Mateo	67,433	120.60	46.56	560	1,500	Municipality	1st	Isabela
San Pablo	26,462	637.90	246.29	41	110	Municipality	2nd	Isabela
Sanchez-Mira	26,292	198.80	76.76	130	340	Municipality	3rd	Cagayan
Santa Ana	34,595	441.30	170.39	78	200	Municipality	2nd	Cagayan
Santa Fe	18,950	399.81	154.37	47	120	Municipality	3rd	Nueva Vizcaya
Santa Maria	25,919	140.00	54.05	190	490	Municipality	4th	Isabela
Santa Praxedes	4,643	109.97	42.46	42	110	Municipality	5th	Cagayan
Santa Teresita	19,476	166.98	64.47	120	310	Municipality	4th	Cagayan
Santiago ^{[1]}	150,313	275.00	106.18	550	1,400	Independent component city	1st	Isabela
Santo Niño	29,066	512.90	198.03	57	150	Municipality	2nd	Cagayan
Santo Tomas	25,997	60.70	23.44	430	1,100	Municipality	4th	Isabela
Solana	89,840	234.60	90.58	380	980	Municipality	1st	Cagayan
Solano	69,296	139.80	53.98	500	1,300	Municipality	1st	Nueva Vizcaya
Tuao	66,147	215.50	83.21	310	800	Municipality	1st	Cagayan
† Tuguegarao	167,297	144.80	55.91	1,200	3,100	Component city	2nd	Cagayan
Tumauini	77,153	467.30	180.43	170	440	Municipality	1st	Isabela
Uyugan	1,466	16.28	6.29	90	230	Municipality	6th	Batanes
Villaverde	21,001	81.50	31.47	260	670	Municipality	5th	Nueva Vizcaya
^{1} Santiago City is administratively and legally independent from the province of Isabela as stated in Section 25 of the LGC.

== Demographics ==
Population census of Cagayan Valley
Year	Pop.	±% p.a.
1903	295,211	—
1918	348,332	+1.11%
1939	600,151	+2.62%
1948	669,006	+1.21%
1960	1,035,750	+3.71%
1970	1,462,723	+3.51%
1975	1,665,245	+2.63%
1980	1,919,091	+2.88%
1990	2,340,545	+2.01%
1995	2,536,035	+1.51%
2000	2,813,159	+2.25%
2007	3,051,487	+1.13%
2010	3,229,163	+2.08%
2015	3,451,410	+1.28%
2020	3,685,744	+1.39%
2024	3,777,608	+0.59%
Source: Philippine Statistics Authority

Population percentage
(2020)

- Batanes: 18,937 (0.5%)
- Cagayan: 1,284,676 (34.0%)
- Isabela: 1,733,048 (45.9%)
- Nueva Vizcaya: 530,106 (14.0%)
- Quirino: 210,841 (5.6%)

=== Languages ===
Ilocano is the main lingua franca (orally) of the region. Other languages include Ibanag and Ivatan, the main language of Batanes. The use of Tagalog and English also serve as the region's language in education, governance, tourism, popular culture, and commerce inside and outside the region.

== Economy ==
Poverty incidence of Cagayan Valley (%)

Source: Philippine Statistics Authority

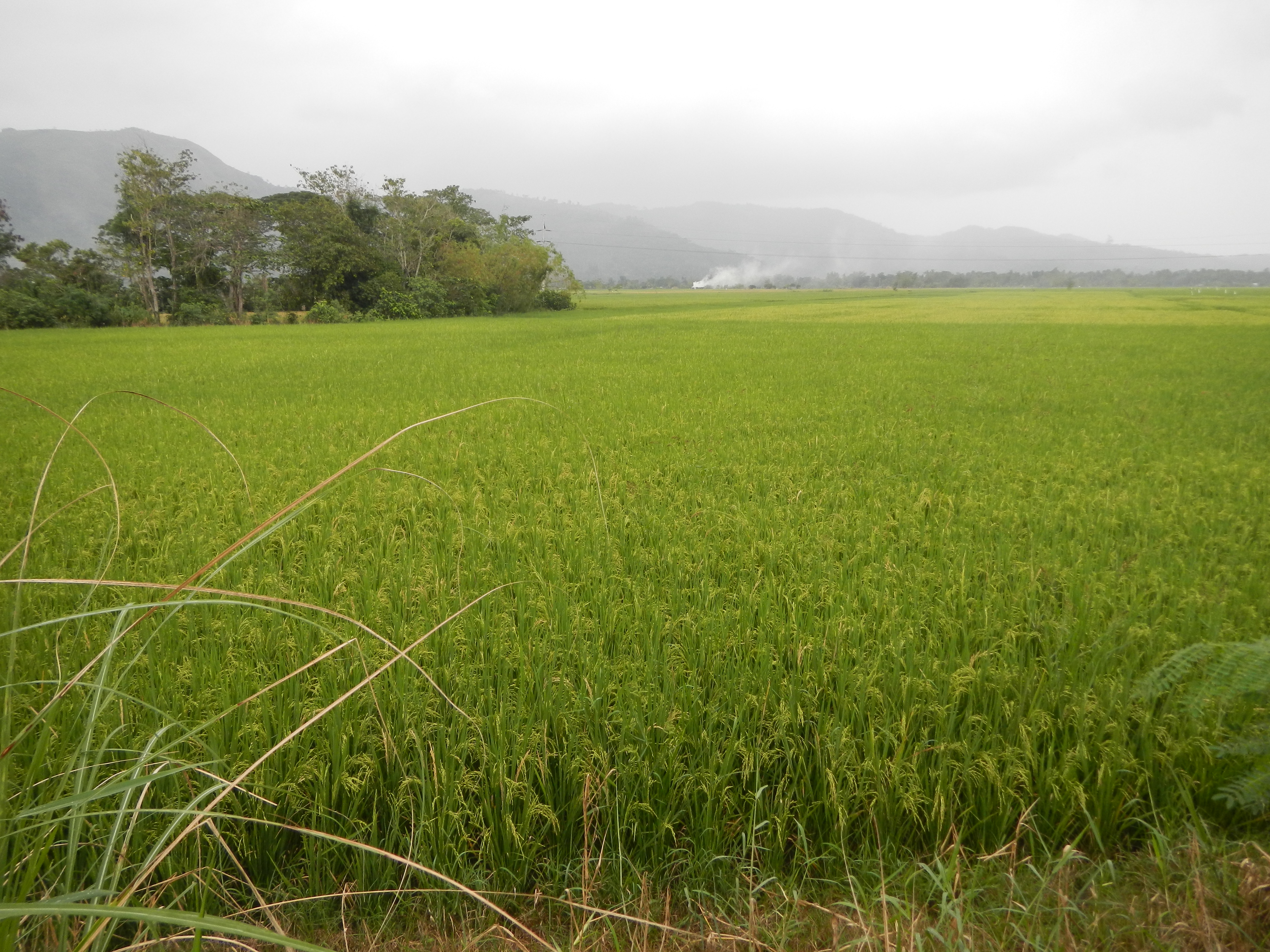
Rice fields in Nueva Vizcaya

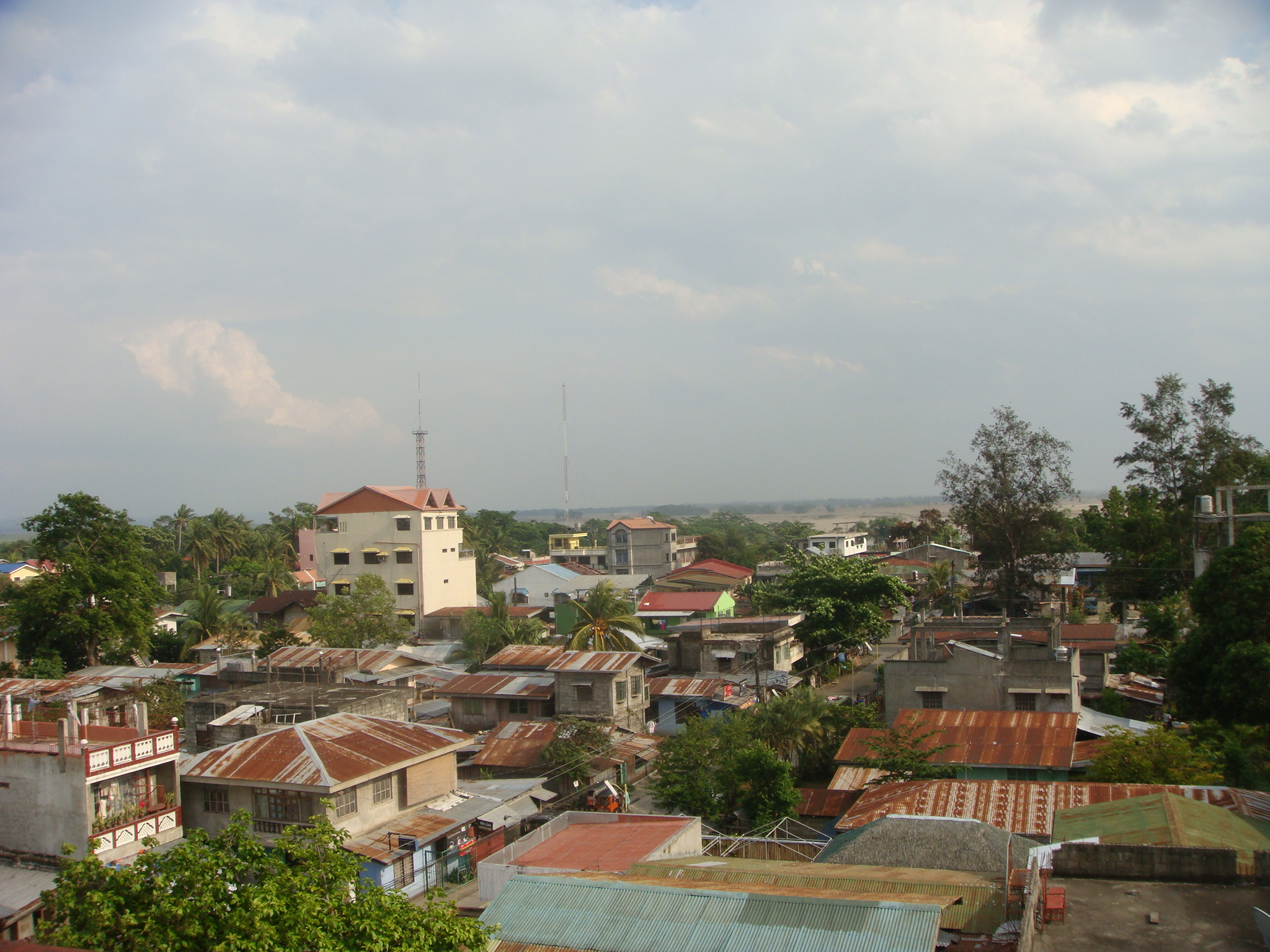
A view of Tuguegarao, Cagayan as seen in April 2011

The province of Isabela and the city of Santiago are notably the most progressive province and richest city in the region, respectively. Isabela was the 9th richest province in the Philippines in 2021, being the only province from the region to be included in the list.

The city of Tuguegarao is the center of excellence in education, commerce, trade and culture and as the economic center of the region, the city continuously aims for outstanding performance and competence in administration, citizen participation, community and economic development, cultural arts, education, fiscal management, infrastructure, intergovernmental cooperation, planning, public safety, recreation and leisure services, social services, and technology. Its economy gradually shifted from agriculture to secondary/tertiary economic activities such as trading, commerce and services. The shift was ushered by city's role as the Regional Government Center and Center of Commerce in Northern Luzon.

Tuguegarao City was included to be one of the digital cities for 2025 to sustain the rapid growth of the Information Technology and Business Process Management and to promote development in the city. The program (Digital Cities 2025) was created through a partnership between the DICT, the IT and Business Process Association of the Philippines (IBPAP), and Leechiu Property Consultants (LPC).

Cauayan is a component city in the province of Isabela. It is nicknamed the “Ideal City of the North” and is the host city for the proposed Isabela Special Economic Zone and the Regional Agro-Industrial Growth Center.[56] Cosmos Bottling Corporation, later acquired by San Miguel Corporation, manufactures soft drinks in the city, and Mega Asia Bottling Corporation operates a plant for the RC Cola brand. Several multinational companies also have regional sales offices there.[57][58]

Ilagan is a component city and the capital of the province of Isabela. The city is the Corn Capital of the Philippines and has been considered as the Primary Growth Center of Region 2. Most of the industries in the city are agri-based. Over the past decades, there has been a great number of local investments in poultry and hog raising. There are several poultry contract growers and small and medium scale hog raisers in the city. Other support facilities, warehouses and small and big rice mills, strategically located in the different barangays of the city to address the storage needs of farmers during the harvest season. Of all cities in the country, Ilagan ranks as the top producer of corn. As an agriculture-based city, it produces ample supply of corn, rice, vegetables and legumes. Fruits like the banana are year-round products especially in the mountainous areas of the city. Ilagan also produces seasonal fruits such as mangoes and pomelo. Commerce and trade is considered to be the city's second economic-based income. It is also the hub of the Coca-Cola FEMSA Philippines, Inc., one of the industrial complexes in the region.

Solano is a first class municipality and the main commercial and financial center of the province of Nueva Vizcaya. It also has the most fast food restaurants chains and the most banks among the municipalities in the entire region. According to the 2016 Cities and Municipalities Competitiveness Index conducted by the National Competitiveness Council, Solano took the 25th spot overall and ranked 30th among the first class and second class municipalities in the Philippines. This further solidified the status of Solano as the undisputed premier town of Cagayan Valley being the premier town in Nueva Vizcaya and the fastest-growing municipality in the region.

Cagayan has several attractions which include beaches, swimming, snorkeling, skin-diving, fishing in the river and the sea, hiking in primeval forest, mountain-climbing, archaeological sites, the collection of the provincial museum, the Callao Caves, and many churches. The Cagayan Economic Zone Authority (CEZA) is situated in Santa Ana, Cagayan.

Quirino is the youngest province in the region. With its agricultural based nature, the vast vegetative agricultural covers reveal the major source of living of the people. Farming has been the main industry in the province, with rice and corn as major crops as with other provinces in the region. Virgin forest and wealthy bodies of water have been great contributors in its development. Small scale industries like furniture making, basketry, rattan craft, and dried/fossilized flower production, where the province was famously known, are prevalent. Banana products also sold in and out the province and also for export purposes. The small scale business and associations also make their own products like banana chips, peanuts, patupats and others. The province also produces a substantial amount of fruits/crops like mango, citrus, pineapple, coffee, coconut, papaya, lanzones, rambutan and vegetables.

The province of Nueva Vizcaya has basically an agricultural economy with commerce, trade, and industry contributing to its growth and development. Among other major economic activities are farming and cattle and swine raising. Primary crops are palay and corn. The province produces quality onions and vegetables often sold in Metro Manila. Oranges and mangoes are now major crops being exported fresh to other Asian countries; earning its title as the Citrus Capital of the Philippines.

Batanes is the northernmost and smallest province in the region as well as in the whole Philippines. It is the only province located outside the mainland Cagayan Valley. Due to its geographical location, fishing is considered as a major industry and source of livelihood for the people. Garlic and cattle are major export crops. Ivatans also plant camote (sweet potato), cassava, gabi or tuber and a unique variety of white uvi. Sugarcane is raised to produce palek, a kind of native wine, and vinegar. Tourism also contributes to the province's thriving economy.

=== Agriculture ===
Cagayan Valley being the country's second largest region in terms of land area. As of 2022, Cagayan Valley region remains to be the top producer of corn in the whole country and second in rice production. Isabela is now dubbed as the top producer of Corn in the Philippines and the Rice Granary of the North.

=== Trade and industry ===
In 2014, retail giants like Robinsons Land and SM Prime opened its pioneer malls in the region, the Robinsons Place Santiago and SM City Cauayan in Santiago City and Cauayan respectively. The two retail companies further strengthened their presence in the region with the opening of SM Center Tuguegarao Downtown in 2017 and Robinsons Place Tuguegarao in 2018, both are located in the region's capital, Tuguegarao City. In 2022, SM Prime opened SM City Tuguegarao, its third in the region and second in Tuguegarao City.

In 2018, Vista Land and Life Scapes, Inc. announced the establishment of its first high-end mall in the region that is Vista Mall Santiago in Santiago City, and they are also putting up Vista Mall in Tuguegarao City it will be second on the region after Vista Mall Santiago.

=== Aquaculture and fishing industry ===
On January 11, 2008, the Bureau of Fisheries and Aquatic Resources (BFAR) stated that tilapia (species of cichlid fishes from the tilapiine cichlid tribe) production grew and Cagayan Valley is now the Philippines' tilapia capital (Saint Peter's fish). Production supply grew 37.25% since 2003, with 14,000 metric tons (MT) in 2007. The recent aquaculture congress found that the growth of tilapia production was due to government interventions: provision of fast-growing species, accreditation of private hatcheries to ensure supply of quality fingerlings, establishment of demonstration farms, providing free fingerlings to newly constructed fishponds, and the dissemination of tilapia to Nueva Vizcaya (in Diadi town). Cagayan Valley is one of the largest tilapia producing regions in the country, with Isabela as the leading producer. The development of the tilapia farming industry in the province came about with the water supply provided by the Magat Reservoir for irrigating rice fields. The high demand for food fish in the region was also a contributing factor. Based on the data from the Bureau Fisheries and Aquatic Resources in 2020, there are about 1,000 hectares of freshwater ponds in Isabela, producing around 16,000 metric tons of tilapia a year.

Cagayan's coastline is one of the longest in the country having almost 73% of Cagayan Valley Region's coastal seaboards. This is aside from the large rivers and their tributaries, lakes, creeks and streams which are also rich fishing and aquaculture grounds. Untapped coastal fishing grounds stretch from the towns of Santa Praxedes in the west to Santa Ana on the east, on its northern coast facing the Babuyan Channel; and from Santa Ana down to Peñablanca on its eastern coast facing the Philippine Sea. Despite this endowment, the province's fish production is not even enough to supply and sustain its own fish requirements. Deep sea fishing is not a common occurrence in the province – thus, foreign poachers are the ones reaping the bounties of its seas. Cagayan's deep seas are known for species like tuna, tuna-like fishes, hairtail, snapper, scad, slipmouth, mullet, grouper, shrimp, squid, and lobsters. The inland waters are used primarily by subsistence fishermen. Few privately operated fishponds and fish cages contribute to the overall fish supply of the Province.

The coastal waters of Isabela are big sources of marine life that could supply the fish requirements of the region, according to a study commissioned by the Bureau of Fisheries and Aquatic Resources (BFAR). The study stated that Isabela waters are rich in untapped fisheries and marine resources and also has extensive sea grass beds and coral reefs that are home to variety of fish species which include sardines and mackerel and have sizable chunks of oceanic tunas, which thrive throughout the year. The fishing ground has 238 marine fish species. High species diversity could be an indication that the habitat is still good and undisturbed.

The fishing industry in Cagayan Valley has been in perturbed condition owing to the declining pattern of production for the past years. Since 2015, average annual reduction in fisheries production in the region was estimated at three thousand metric tons or more than five percent decrease per year. In 2020, the latest estimated production at 45,382 metric tons is 4.6 percent lower than the 2018 total fish production of 47,572 metric tons and almost one third lower than the highest production realized in 2011 at 64,876 metric tons.

By fishing grounds classification in the region, there is an inland municipal fisheries production and marine municipal fisheries production, the latter, particularly in provinces with coastal areas in the provinces of Cagayan, Isabela and Batanes. According to the Philippine Statistics Authority (PSA), inland municipal production for 2021 has gone up close to 2,000 metric tons, while marine municipal production reached close to 3,300 metric tons, both as an initial production in the first quarter of 2020.

According to the Bureau Fisheries and Aquatic Resources (BFAR), since 2010 to 2015, the fish sufficiency level in Cagayan Valley is on downtrend level because of the various threats to the industry. Several problems have affected the sector in the recent years including the weather disturbances, use of illegal fishing gears and methods and the increasing demand of a fast-growing population. The provinces of Batanes and Cagayan have passed the 100 percent sufficiency level at 138 percent while Cagayan recorded 96 percent. However, the performances of Isabela, Quirino and Nueva Vizcaya at 17 percent, 11 percent and 10 percent, respectively, have affected the total performance of the region. Data obtained from the Bureau Fisheries and Aquatic Resources showed that from 2006 to 2015, the sufficiency level has dropped significantly in 2010 until it reached its lowest level at 44 percent in the last five years. However, the overall fisheries production in the region grew by one percent in 3rd Quarter of 2020. From the total output of 11,954 metric tons in 2019, it accelerated to 12,075 metric tons in 2020.

=== Citrus industry ===
Cagayan Valley is positioned to become the country's Citrus Capital through a program undertaken by the Nueva Vizcaya State University (NVSU) with funding from the Philippine Council for Agriculture, Aquatic and Natural Resources Research and Development of the Department of Science and Technology (DoST-PCAARRD). The country's domestic supply of citrus is currently insufficient to meet local demand, according to DoST-PCAARRD, due to "high incidence of pest and diseases, poor orchard management, and low adoption of improved management practices, among many other factors." The NVSU's citrus research and development program includes yield improvement, setting up a gene bank, and value chain analysis. It targets a 233% increase in yield – from 4.5 tons per hectare ha (t/ha) to 15 t/ha – and a 60% reduction in post-harvest losses from 25% to 10% by 2019. The targets are part of the Citrus Industry Strategic S&T Program (ISP) of DoST-PCAARRD. By the end of 2017, the program team is expected to produce value chain maps for calamansi, orange, and pomelo in the region; characterize fifteen species for the database system of the gene bank study; improve NVSU and Municipal Agriculture Office (MAGRO) citrus nurseries producing 10,000 and 2,000 budded seedlings, respectively; establish new 1-hectare orchard with planting materials from NVSU; and generate data on the description of local citrus pests and diseases.

== Infrastructure ==
=== Roads and Bridges ===
- Pigalo Bridge - The Pigalo Bridge traverses over the Cagayan River in Angadanan, Isabela. This bridge connects the two municipalities of Angadanan in the northeast, and San Guillermo in the southwest. The proposed construction of the Pigalo Bridge approaches the span of about 450 lin. meters across the river. The project officially started on April 10, 2017, and was completed on April 29, 2019.
- Buntun Bridge - Buntun Bridge, built over three administrations from 1960 to 1969, connects the Municipality of Solana and the City of Tuguegarao, crossing the Cagayan River. It is among the longest bridges in the Philippines. The bridge extends 1,369 m (meters) in length.
- Expressways - The expressways, also known as High Standard Highway (HSH) in the region, were proposed in a study by the Japan International Cooperation Agency (JICA) in 2021. The proposed expressways are:
  - Northern East-West Expressway
    - Northern East-West High Standard Highway 1 - A 89.18-kilometer expressway that will connect Laoag, Ilocos Norte to Claveria, paralleling the same as Pan Philippine Highway.
    - Northern East-West High Standard Highway 2 - A 92.12-kilometer route that is part of the expressway between Claveria and Lal-lo.
  - Cagayan Valley Expressway
    - Cagayan Valley High Standard Highway 1 - A 175.35-kilometer expressway that will connect Bayombong to Tuguegarao City.
    - Cagayan Valley High Standard Highway 2 - A 60.07-kilometer section that connects Tuguegarao City to Allacapan.
- Dalton Pass East Alternative Road - The Dalton Pass East Alternative Road is a 23-kilometer highway that links between Nueva Vizcaya and Quirino. It involves the construction of 6.1 kilometers of twin tunnels, 10 bridges of 5.8 kilometers, and flood control.

== Image gallery ==
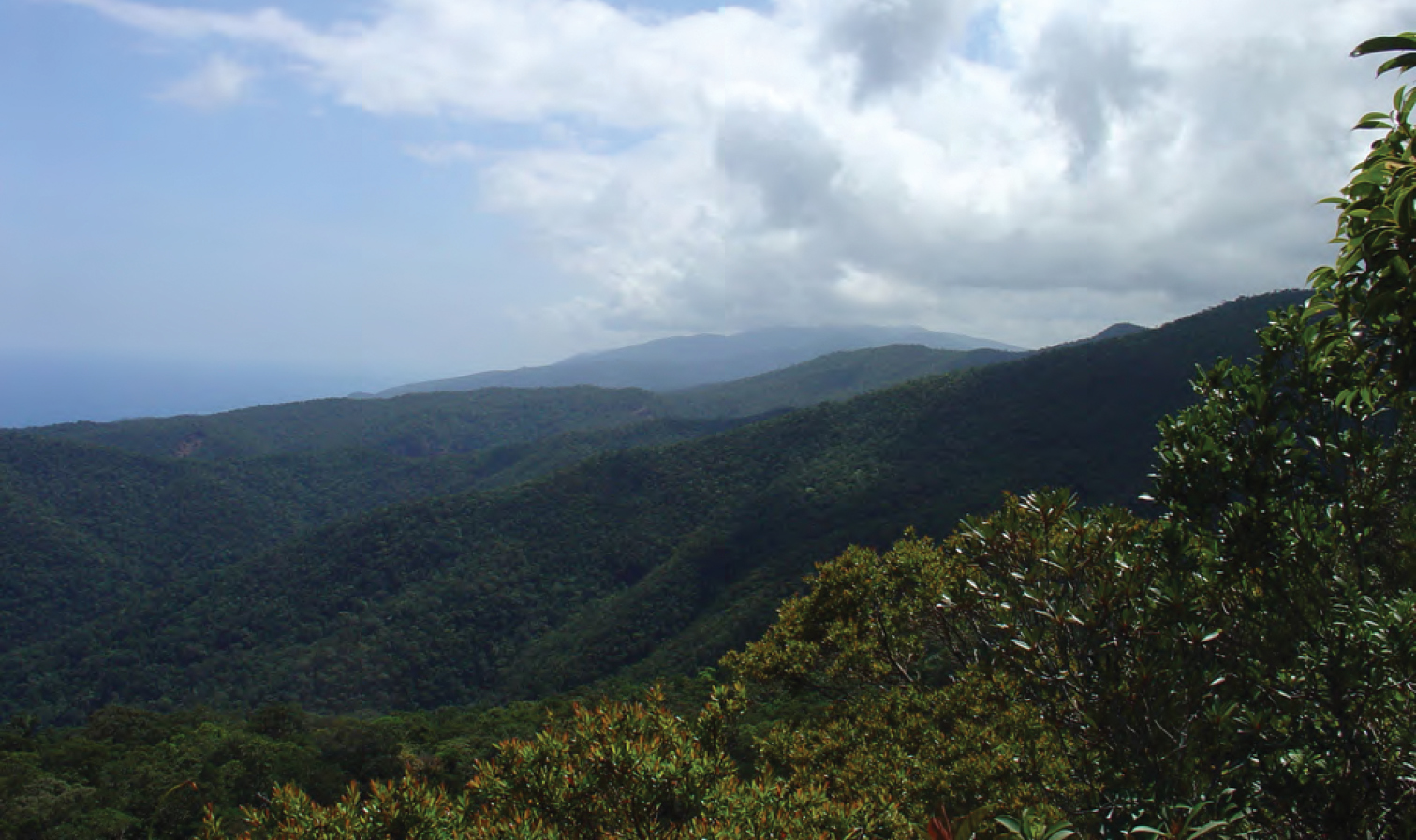
Sierra Madre mountains at Palanan

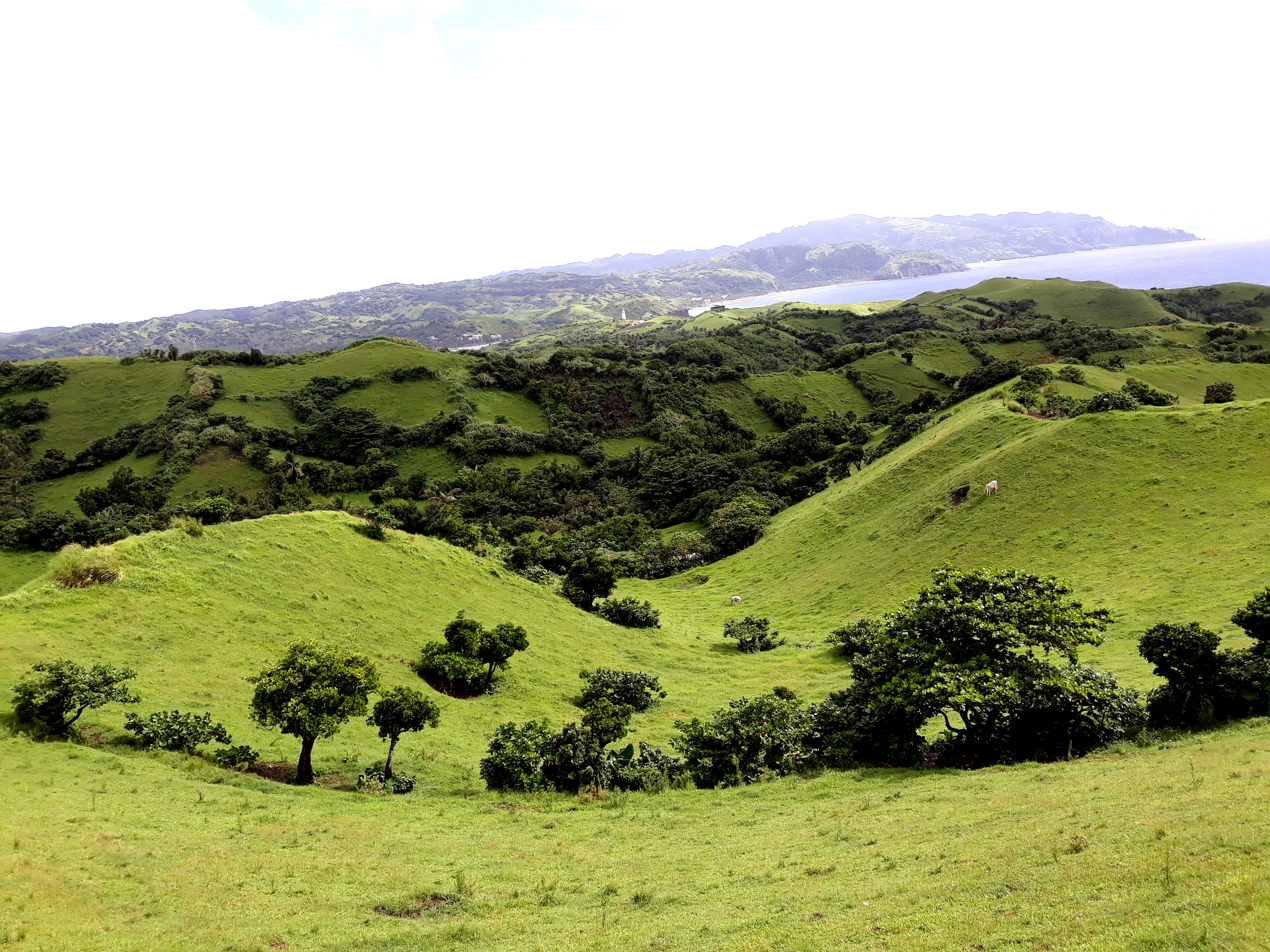
Landscape of Batanes

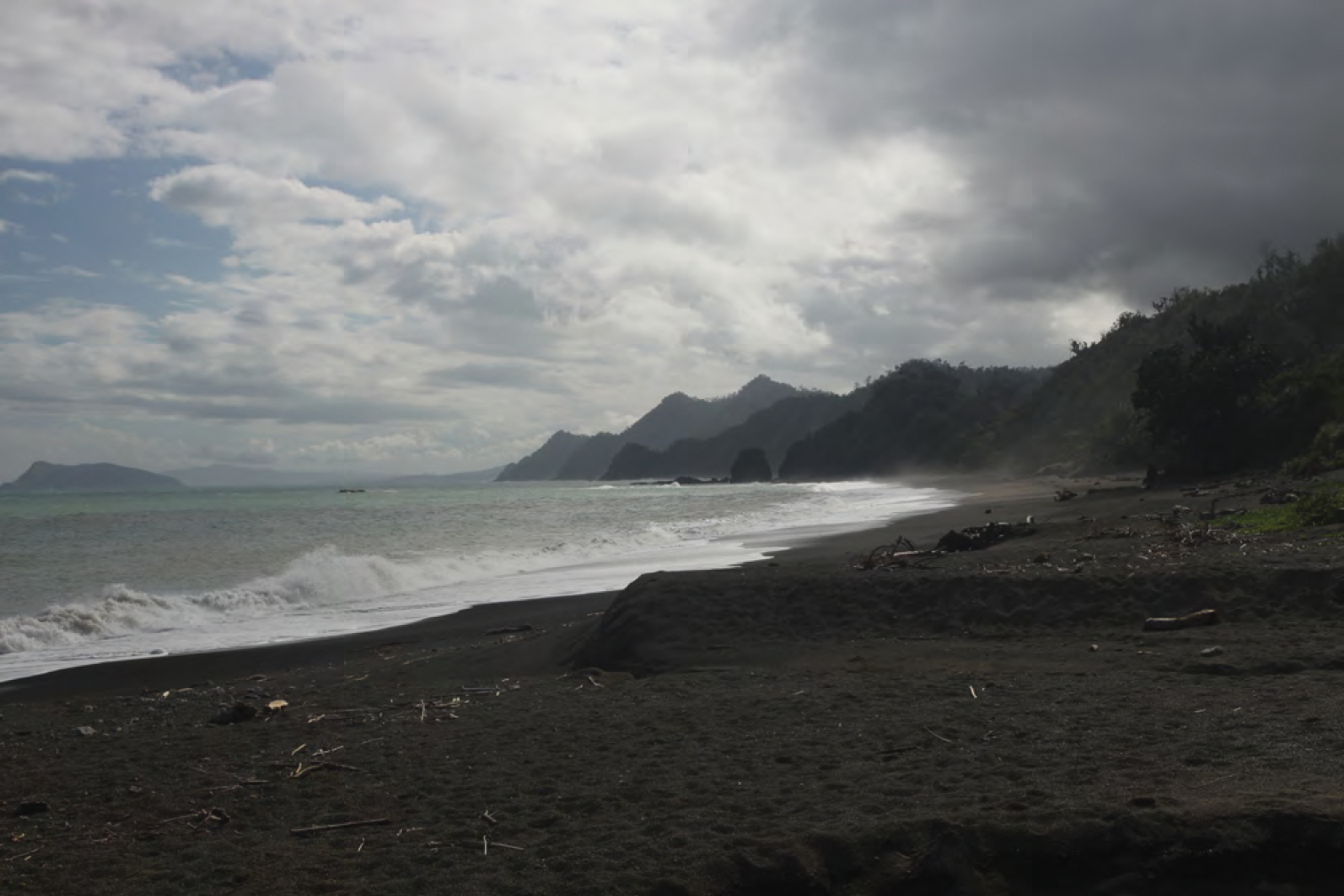
Eastern coast of Isabela

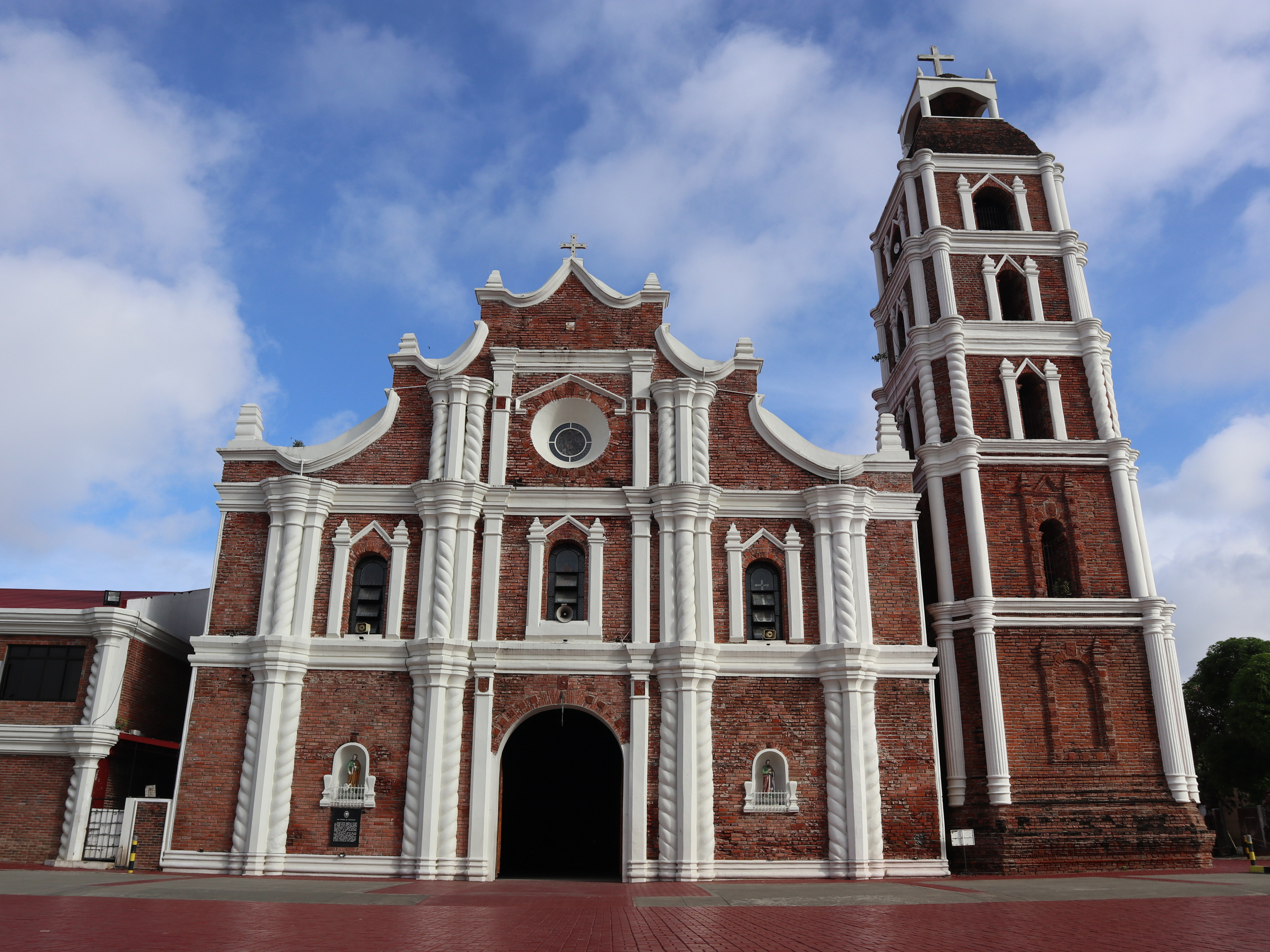
Tuguegarao Cathedral

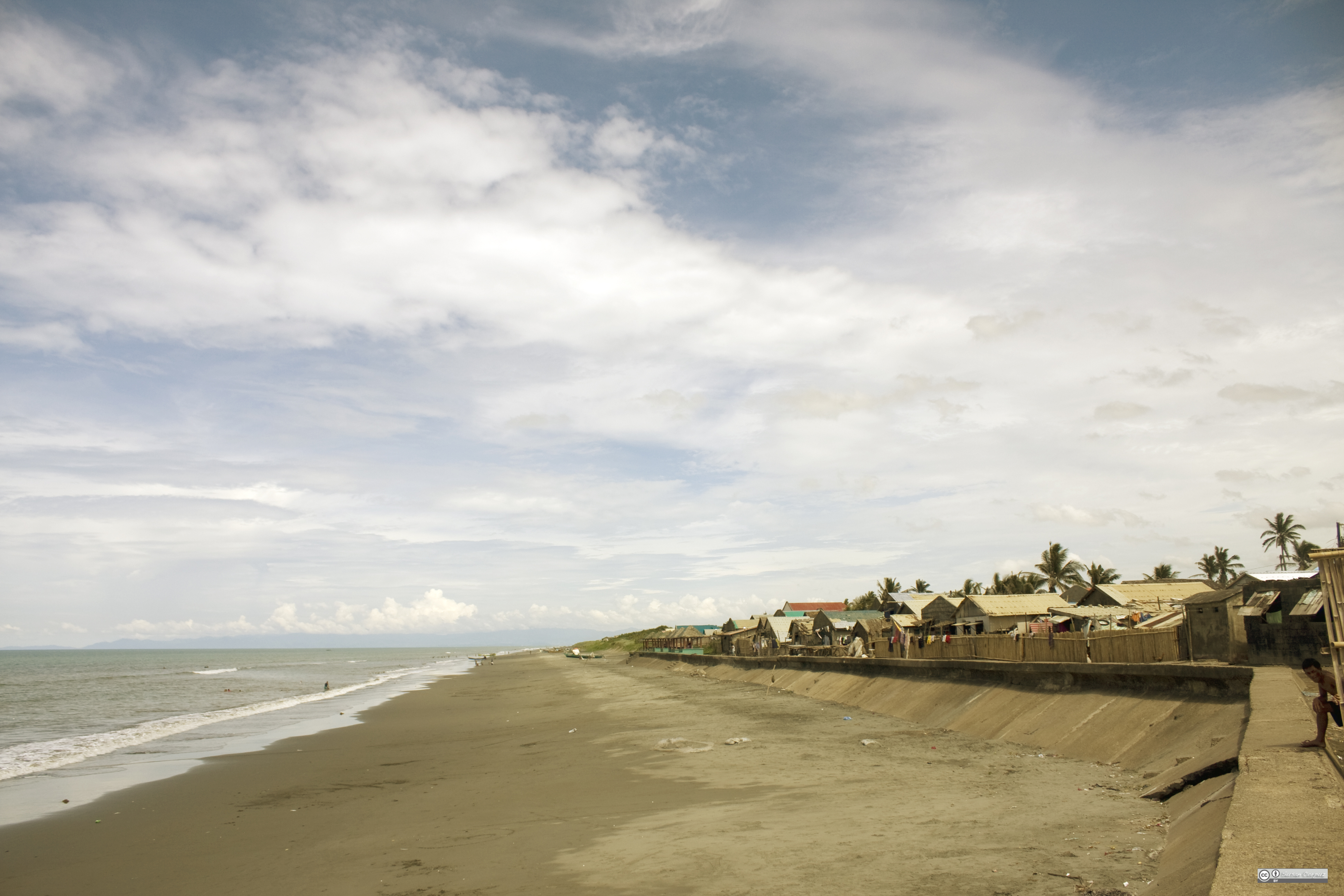
Northern coast of Cagayan

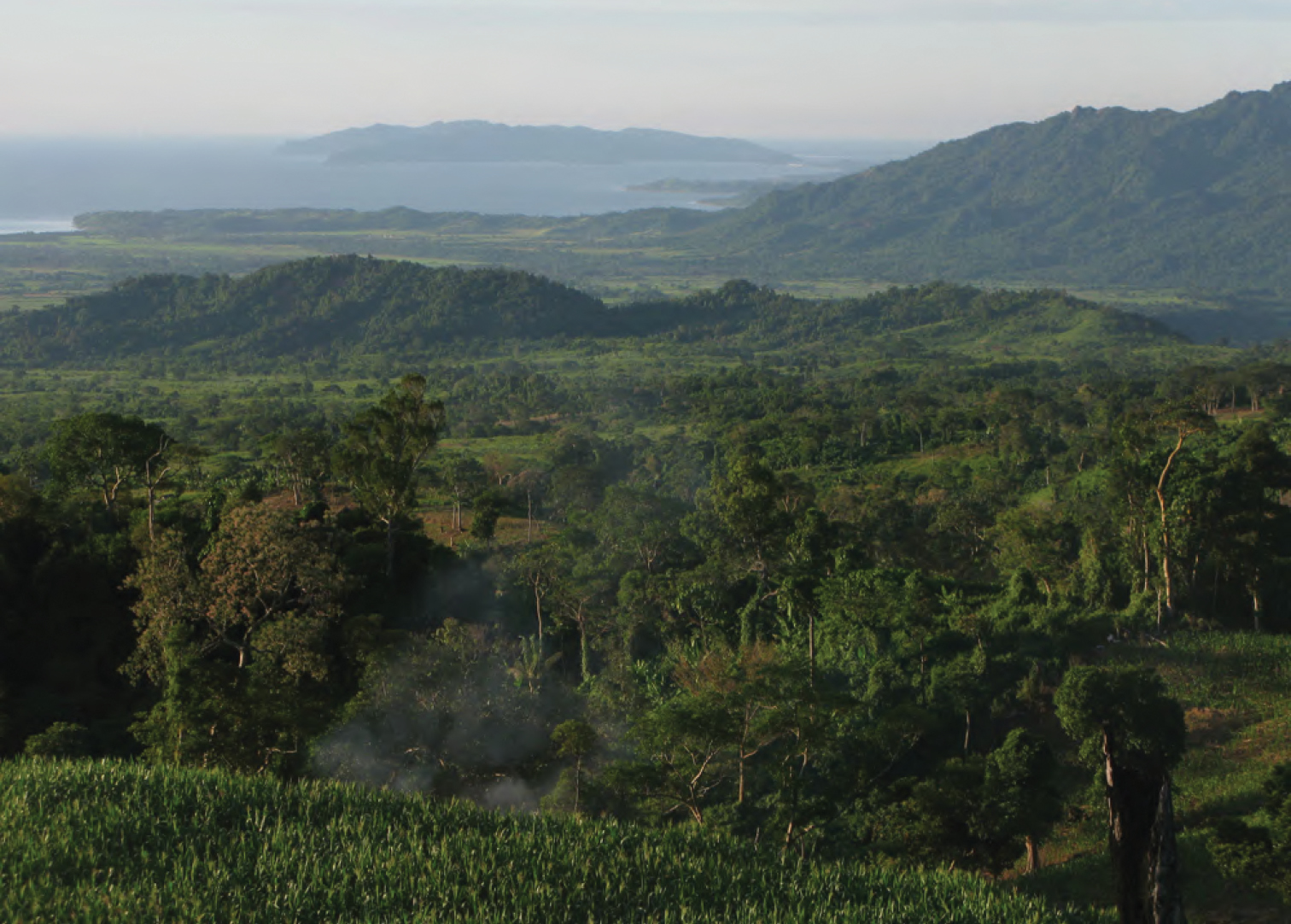
Northern end of the Sierra Madre with Palaui Island in the background

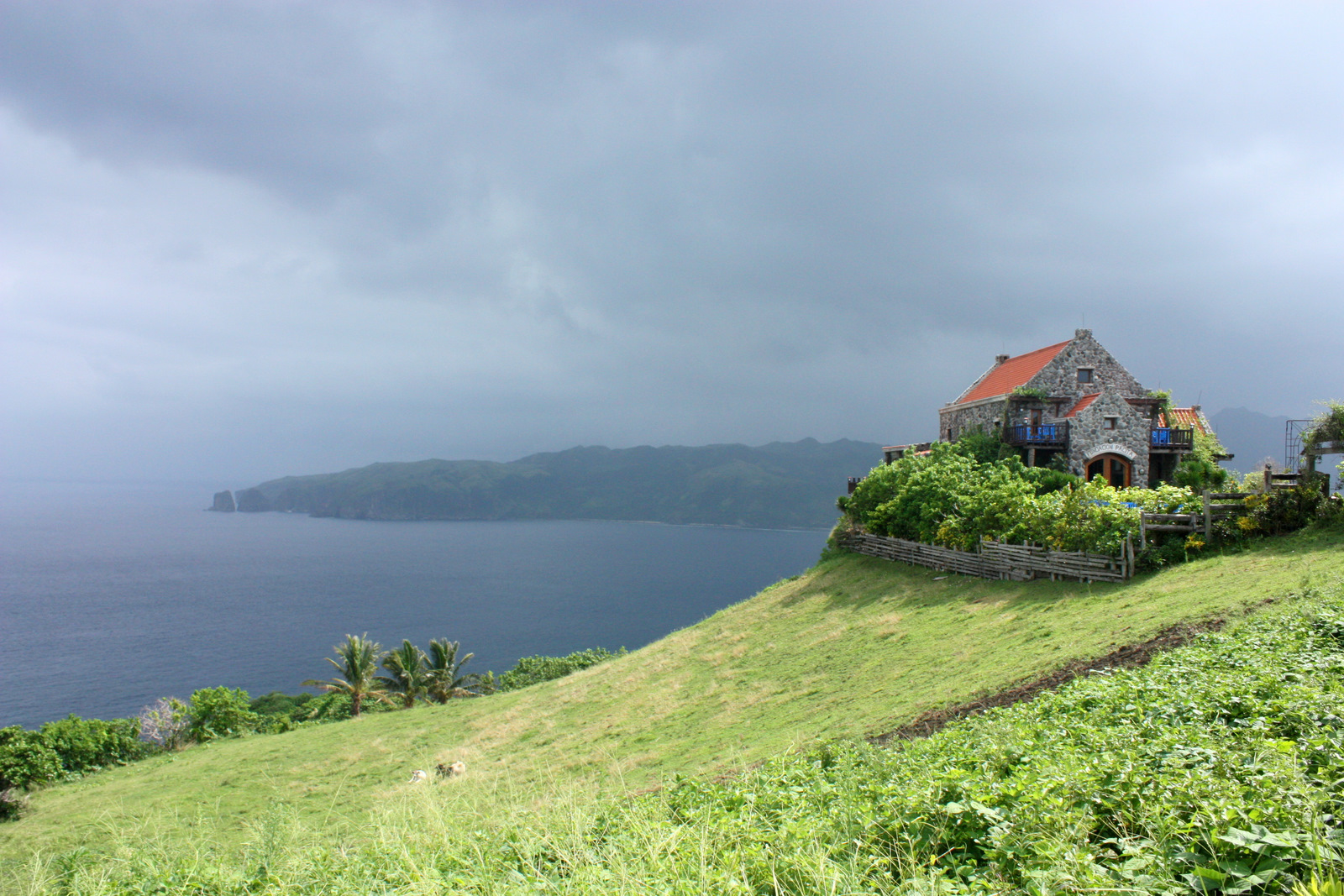
Batanes coastline in Batan Island

== See also ==
- List of Cultural Properties of the Philippines in Cagayan Valley
