= Pata Church Ruins =

Church ruins in Cagayan, Philippines

- Mga Guho ng Simbahan ng Pata (Filipino)
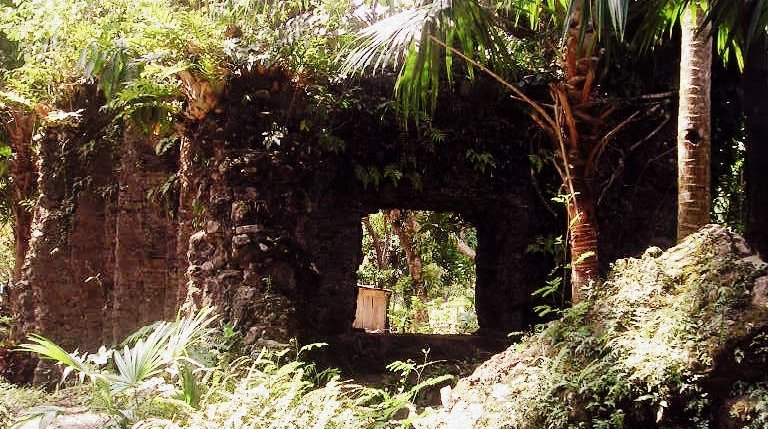

- Location in Luzon Location in the Philippines
- 18°36′51″N 121°9′38″E
- Type: Church
- Location: Sitio Nagsimbaanan, Brgy. Namuac, Sanchez Mira, Cagayan, Philippines

History
- Built: June 15, 1595
- Built by: Dominican Order

Site notes
- Management: National Historical Commission of the Philippines

The Ruins of the Church of Pata are the remnants of a 16th-century Dominican church in Sanchez Mira, Cagayan, Philippines. It was constructed under the supervision of Fray Gaspar Zarfate and Miguel de San Jacinto.

== Location ==
The Pata Church ruins are halfway between the town propers of Sanchez Mira and Claveria, Cagayan along the Pan-Philippine Highway. It is located close to the Pata River in Sitio Nagsimbaanan, Barangay Namuac of Sanchez Mira.
