= Iguig Church =

Roman Catholic church in Cagayan, Philippines

- Saint James the Apostle Parish Church
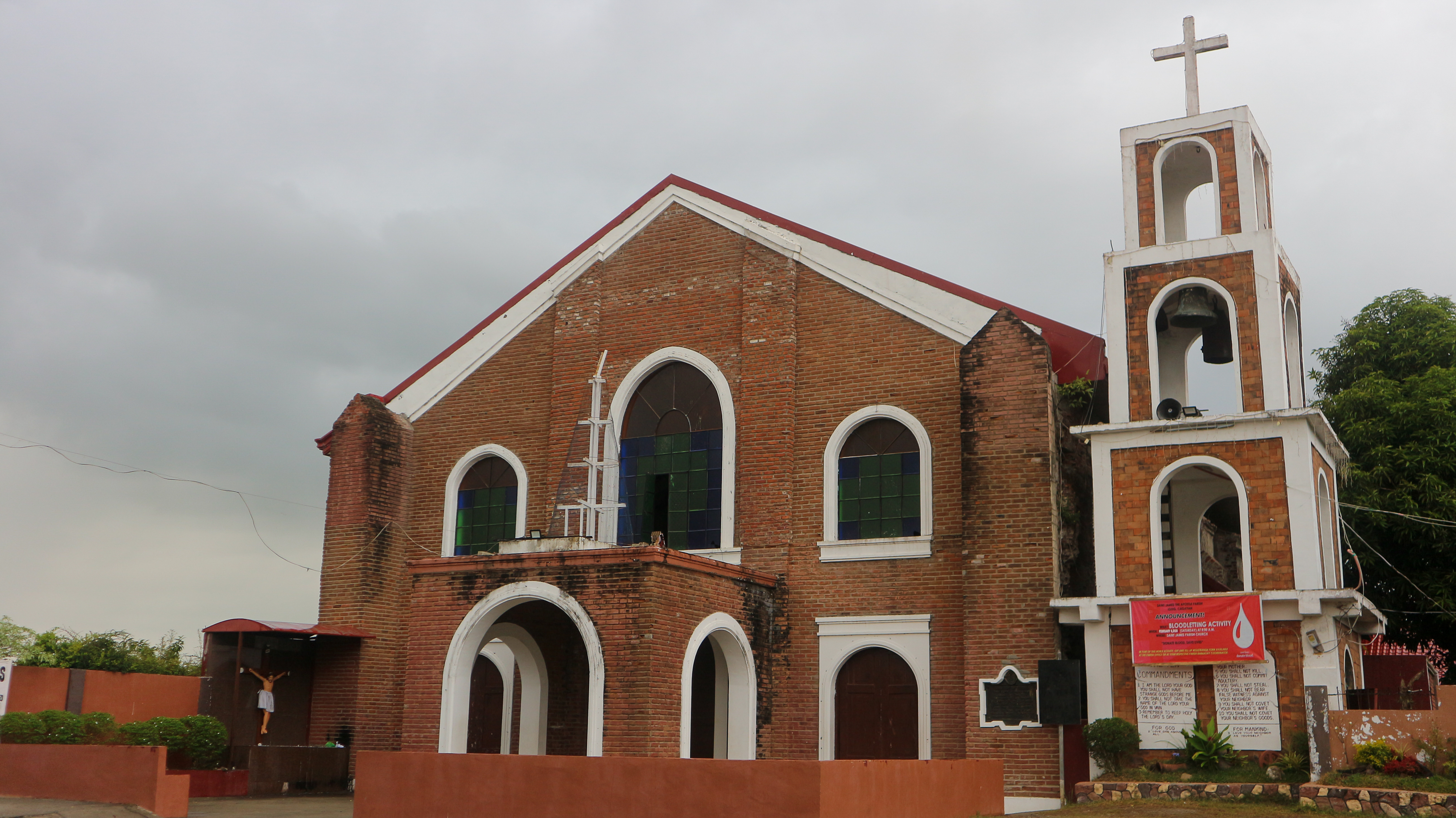
- Church facade in 2020

- Location in Luzon Location in the Philippines
- 17°45′1.91″N 121°44′4.74″E
- Location: Iguig, Cagayan
- Country: Philippines
- Denomination: Roman Catholic

History
- Status: Parish church
- Dedication: James the Great

Architecture
- Functional status: Active
- Heritage designation: National Historical Landmark
- Designated: 1939
- Architectural type: Church building
- Completed: 1787; 239 years ago

Administration
- Archdiocese: Tuguegarao

Saint James the Apostle Parish Church, commonly known as Iguig Church, is a Roman Catholic church located in Iguig, Cagayan. It is under the jurisdiction of the Archdiocese of Tuguegarao. The current church building was completed in 1787. It was made from red bricks, with arched buttresses supporting the building's wall.

The National Historical Commission of the Philippines declared the church as a national landmark in 1939.

== Gallery ==
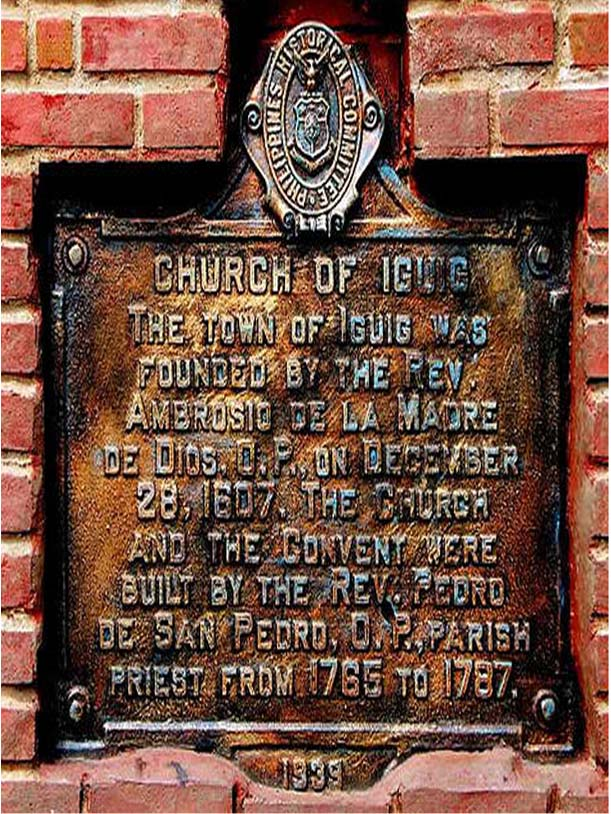
Church PHC historical marker installed in 1939

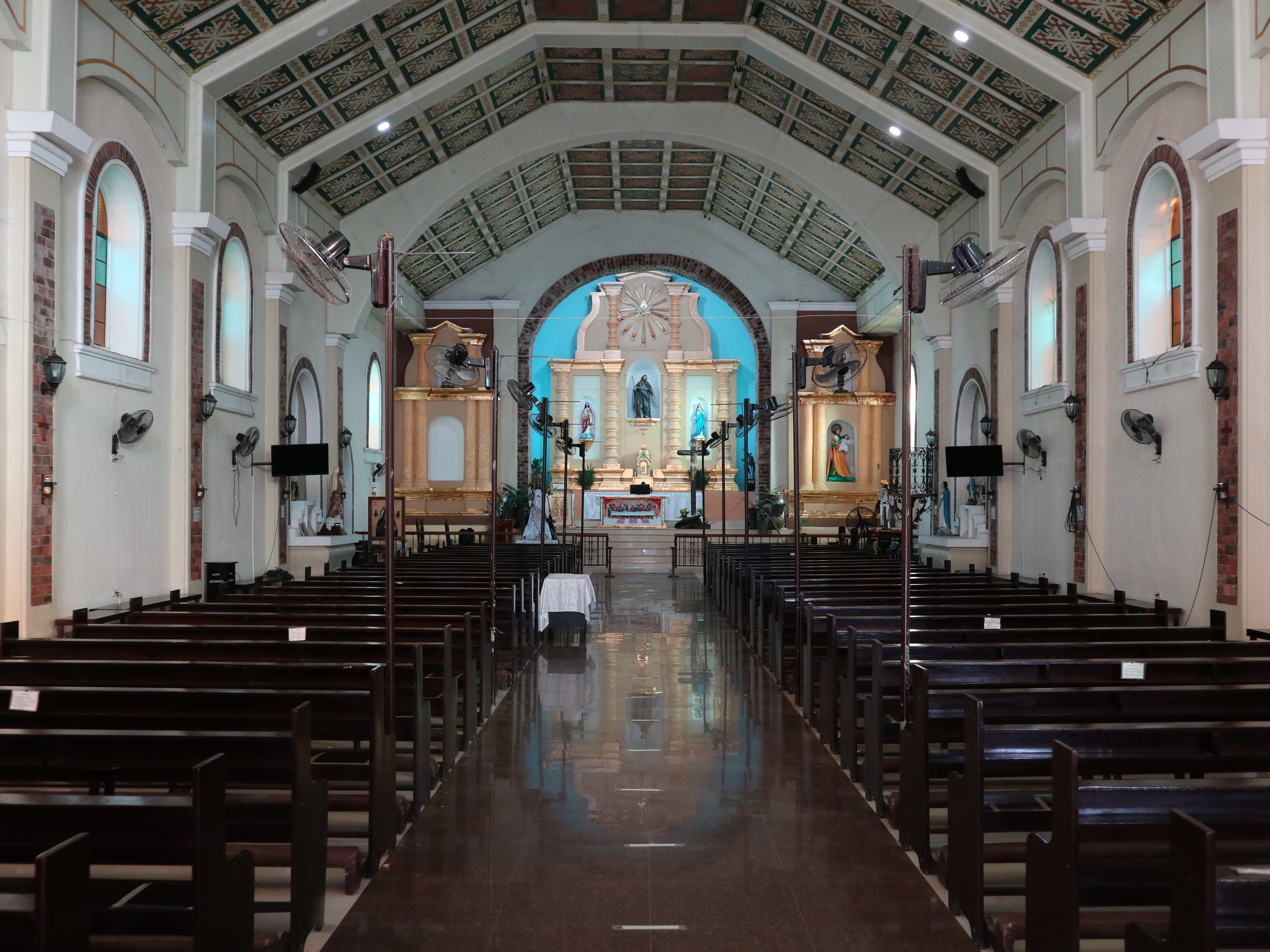
Church interior in 2022

Rear view of the church

A station at the Calvary Hills
