= Ivana Church =

Roman Catholic church in Batanes, Philippines

- San Jose de Ivana Parish Church; Saint Joseph the Worker Parish Church
- San Jose Obrero Parish Church
- Iglesia Parroquia de San José de Ivana (Spanish)
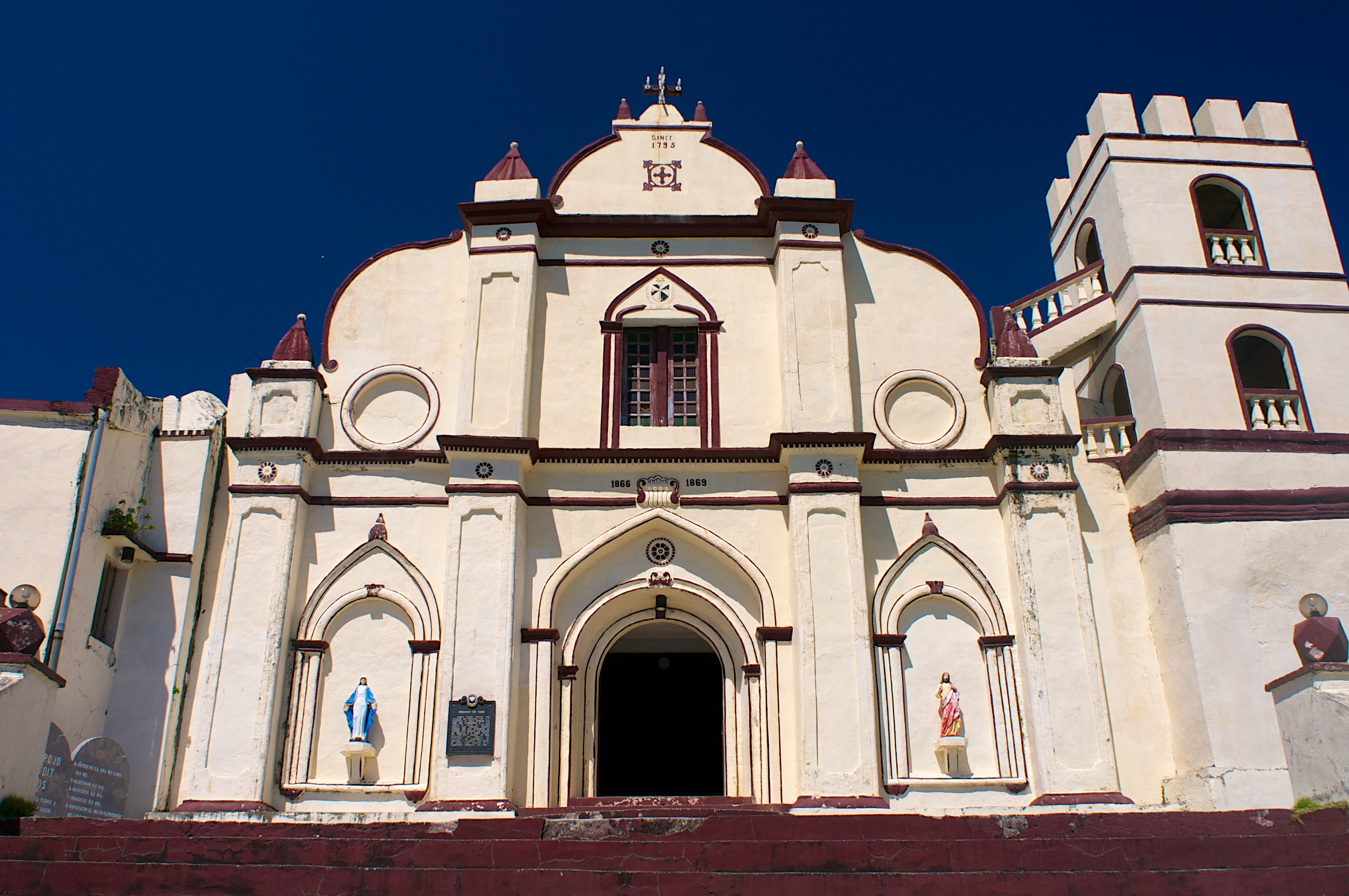
- Church façade

- Location in Batanes Location in Luzon Location in the Philippines
- 20°22′01″N 121°54′51″E
- Location: Ivana, Batanes
- Country: Philippines
- Denomination: Roman Catholic

History
- Status: Parish church
- Dedication: Saint Joseph

Architecture
- Functional status: Active
- Architectural type: Church building

Administration
- Archdiocese: Tuguegarao
- Diocese: Prelature of Batanes

Clergy
- Archbishop: Ricardo Baccay
- Bishop: Danilo Ulep

San Jose de Ivana Church, also known as Saint Joseph the Worker Parish Church and Ivana Church, is a Roman Catholic church located in Ivana, Batanes, Philippines dedicated to Saint Joseph under the jurisdiction of the Prelature of Batanes. The church was declared a National Historical Landmark by the National Historical Commission of the Philippines in 2008.

== History ==
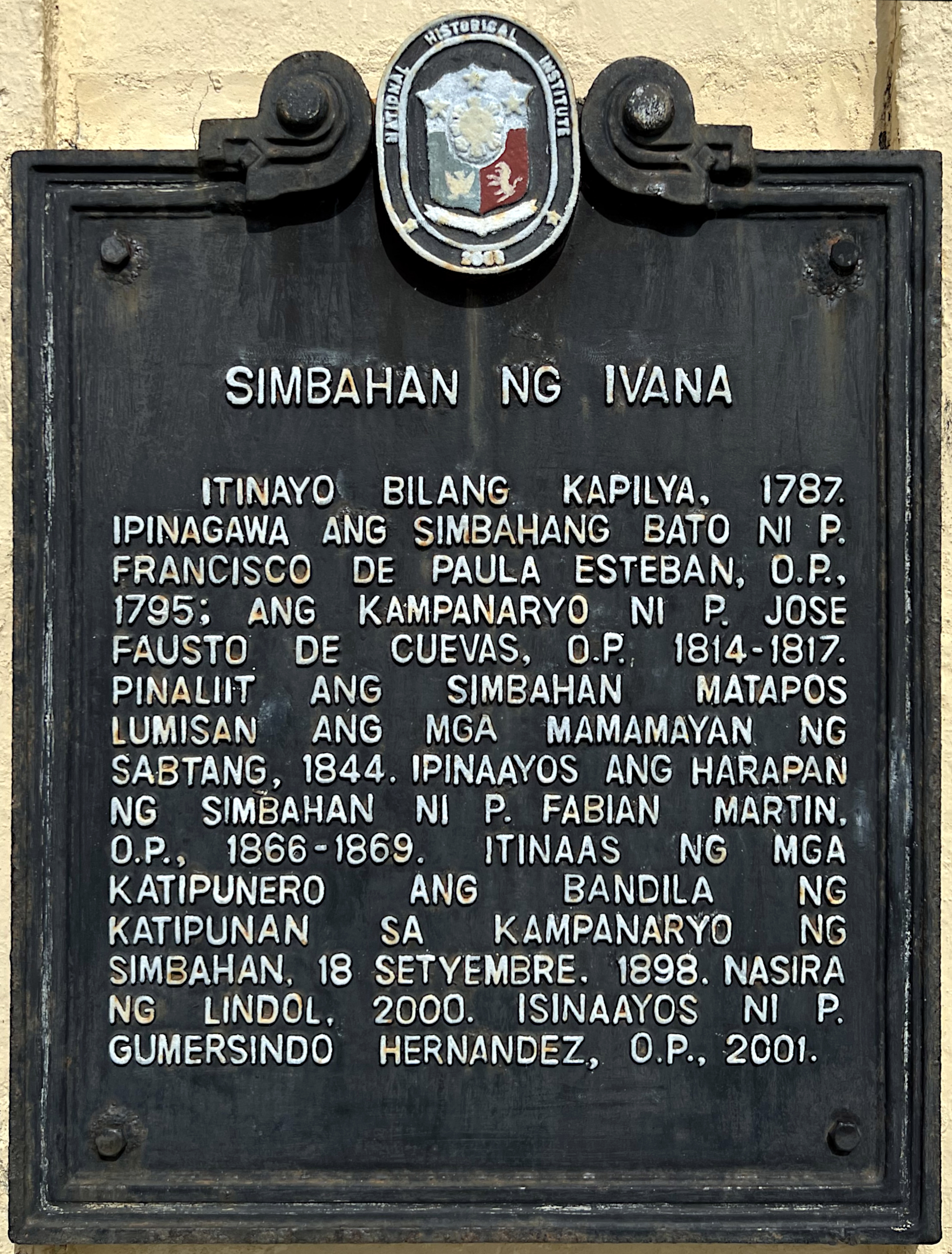
Church NHI historical marker

The church of Ivana was first established by the Dominicans as a chapel in 1787. Originally, there were three mission chapels in Said, Kadpidan and Radiwan in Ivana. The present stone church and convent was built in Radiwan under the direction of Father Francisco de Paula Esteban, OP, in 1795, while the bell tower was constructed during the term of Father Fausto de Cuevas, OP from 1814 to 1817. The church was intended to serve the people of Ivana, Sabtang and Uyugan. The residents of Sabtang had been forcibly resettled in Ivana, but were later allowed to return to their island, reducing the size of the congregation. In 1844, space in the church's nave that was no longer needed was closed off. The façade was renovated during the term of Father Fabian Martin, OP, from 1866 to 1869. The church was partially destroyed due to an earthquake in 2000 and was later renovated during the term of Father Gumersindo Hernandez, OP, in 2001.

Filipino revolutionaries waved the Katipunan flag in the church's bell tower on September 18, 1898.

== Architectural features ==
The church's façade was built alongside the shortening of its nave in 1854. When the population decreased in the 1840s due to the return of the Isabtang to Sabtang, the rear portion of the church was closed. Today, ruins of the abandoned portion of the church can still be seen. It also has a crenellated bell tower supported by unusual buttresses. Its convent, which is part of the church complex, has an unusual circular masonry work near the stairway.
