= 2025 Batanes local elections =

Philippine elections

- May 12, 2025
- Gubernatorial election
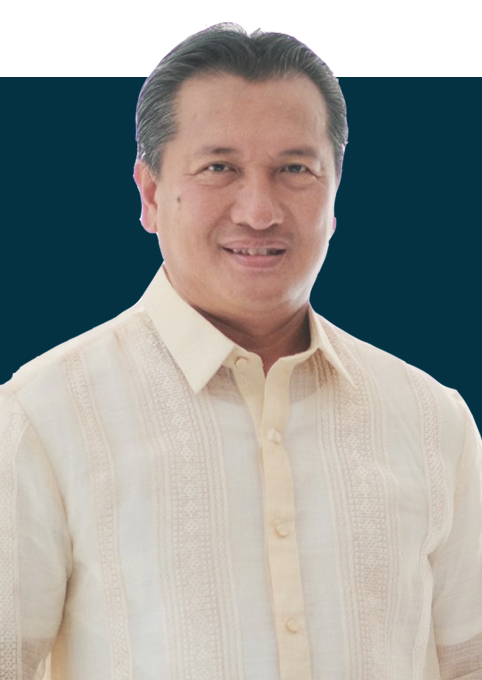
		NPC
Candidate	Jun Aguto	Jun Abad
Party	PFP	NPC
Running mate	Jhong Nanud	Ferdie Elica
	LP	Aksyon
Candidate	Ignacio Villa	Telesforo Castillejos
Party	Liberal	Aksyon
Running mate	Wally Estamo	Juan Redondo
Incumbent Governor
Marilou Cayco
PFP
- Vice gubernatorial election
	PFP	NPC
Candidate	Jhong Nanud	Ferdie Elica
Party	PFP	NPC
	LP	Aksyon
Candidate	Wally Estamo	Juan Redondo
Party	Liberal	Aksyon
Incumbent Vice Governor
Ignacio Villa
Liberal
- Provincial Board election
- 8 out of 12 seats in the Batanes Provincial Board; 7 seats needed for a majority
Party	Current seats
Liberal	3
Aksyon	1
NPC	1
PFP	1

Local elections were held in Batanes on May 12, 2025, as part of the 2025 Philippine general election. Batanes voters will elect a governor, a vice governor, and 8 out of 12 members of the Batanes Provincial Board.

== Governor ==
Term-limited incumbent Marilou Cayco (Partido Federal ng Pilipinas) is running for the House of Representatives in Batanes's lone legislative district. Cayco was re-elected under the Liberal Party with 61.04% of the vote in 2022.

=== Candidates ===
The following candidates are included in the ballot:

No.	Candidate	Party
1	Jun Abad	Nationalist People's Coalition
2	Jun Aguto	Partido Federal ng Pilipinas
3	Telesforo Castillejos	Aksyon Demokratiko
4	Ignacio Villa	Liberal Party

=== Results ===
Candidate	Party	Votes	%
Jun Aguto	Partido Federal ng Pilipinas	3,951	35.33
Jun Abad	Nationalist People's Coalition	3,738	33.43
Ignacio Villa	Liberal Party	2,018	18.05
Telesforo Castillejos	Aksyon Demokratiko	1,476	13.20
Total		11,183	100.00

==== By municipality ====
Municipality	Aguto		Abad		Villa		Castillejos		Total votes	
Municipality	Votes	%	Votes	%	Votes	%	Votes	%	Total votes	
Basco	1,446	28.92	1,826	36.52	811	16.22	917	18.34	5,000	100.00
Itbayat	479	28.56	558	33.27	479	28.56	161	9.60	1,677	100.00
Ivana	621	60.88	211	20.69	118	11.57	70	6.86	1,020	100.00
Mahatao	525	41.77	426	33.89	206	16.39	100	7.96	1,257	100.00
Sabtang	447	37.16	390	32.42	256	17.66	110	9.14	1,203	100.00
Uyugan	433	42.20	327	31.87	148	14.42	118	11.50	1,026	100.00
Total	3,951	35.33	3,738	33.44	2,018	18.05	1,476	13.20	11,183	100.00

== Vice governor ==
Incumbent Ignacio Villa (Liberal Party) is running for governor of Batanes. Villa was re-elected with 33.10% of the vote in 2022.

=== Candidates ===
The following candidates are included in the ballot:

No.	Candidate	Party
1	Ferdie Elica	Nationalist People's Coalition
2	Wally Estamo	Liberal Party
3	Jhong Nanud	Partido Federal ng Pilipinas
4	Juan Redondo	Aksyon Demokratiko

=== Results ===
Candidate	Party	Votes	%
Jhong Nanud	Partido Federal ng Pilipinas	3,269	30.81
Ferdie Elica	Nationalist People's Coalition	2,865	27.00
Wally Estamo	Liberal Party	2,795	26.34
Juan Redondo	Aksyon Demokratiko	1,682	15.85
Total		10,611	100.00

==== By municipality ====
Municipality	Nanud		Elica		Estamo		Redondo		Total votes	
Municipality	Votes	%	Votes	%	Votes	%	Votes	%	Total votes	
Basco	1,004	20.87	1,329	27.63	1,334	27.73	1,143	23.76	4,810	100.00
Itbayat	442	29.25	481	31.83	425	28.13	163	10.79	1,511	100.00
Ivana	421	45.12	159	13.08	264	28.30	89	9.54	933	100.00
Mahatao	392	32.21	420	34.51	275	22.60	130	10.68	1,217	100.00
Sabtang	443	39.00	301	26.50	292	25.70	100	8.80	1,136	100.00
Uyugan	567	56.47	175	17.43	205	20.42	57	5.68	1,004	100.00
Total	3,269	30.81	2,865	27.00	2,795	26.34	1,682	15.85	10,611	100.00

== Provincial Board ==
Since Batanes' reclassification as a 4th class province in 2025, the Batanes Provincial Board is composed of 12 board members, eight of whom are elected.

=== Retiring and term-limited board members ===
The following board member is retiring:

- Roland Cabitac (Partido Federal ng Pilipinas, 2nd provincial district), running for mayor of Ivana

The following board member is term-limited:

- Juan Redondo (Aksyon Demokratiko, 1st provincial district), running for vice governor of Batanes

=== Overview ===
Party	Votes	%	Seats
Liberal Party	13,596	41.39	3
Partido Federal ng Pilipinas	9,107	27.72	3
Nationalist People's Coalition	6,624	20.16	1
Aksyon Demokratiko	1,558	4.74	0
Independent	1,964	5.98	1
Ex officio seats			3
Reserved seats			1
Total	32,849	100.00	12

=== 1st provincial district ===
Batanes's 1st provincial district consists of the municipalities of Basco and Mahatao. Five board members are elected from this provincial district.

==== Candidates ====
The following candidates are included in the ballot:

No.	Candidate	Party
1	John Dave Ablat	Partido Federal ng Pilipinas
2	Juanita Acacio	Aksyon Demokratiko
3	Pipin Castillo	Partido Federal ng Pilipinas
4	Arlyne Castillo-Velayo	Nationalist People's Coalition
5	Benny Fajardo	Liberal Party
6	Celerina Navarro	Nationalist People's Coalition
7	Roel Nicolas (incumbent)	Liberal Party
8	Ann Viola (incumbent)	Liberal Party

==== Results ====
Candidate	Party	Votes	%
Roel Nicolas (incumbent)	Liberal	4,165	19.26
Ann Viola (incumbent)	Liberal	3,982	18.41
Pipin Castillo	Partido Federal ng Pilipinas	3,156	14.59
Benny Fajardo	Liberal	2,696	12.47
John Dave Ablat	Partido Federal ng Pilipinas	2,372	10.97
Arlyne Castillo-Velayo	Nationalist People's Coalition	1,866	8.63
Celerina Navarro	Nationalist People's Coalition	1,830	8.46
Juanita Acacio	Aksyon Demokratiko	1,558	7.20
Total		21,625	100.00

=== 2nd provincial district ===
Batanes's 2nd provincial district consists of the municipalities of Itbayat, Ivana, Sabtang and Uyugan. Three board members are elected from this provincial district.

==== Candidates ====
The following candidates are included in the ballot:

No.	Candidate	Party
1	Juan Caballero	Nationalist People's Coalition
2	Juliet Cataluna (incumbent)	Liberal Party
3	Rogelio Delapa	Liberal Party
4	Cleo Gonzales	Independent
5	Leonardo Hostallero	Partido Federal ng Pilipinas
6	Byron Peralta (incumbent)	Nationalist People's Coalition
7	Preciosa Rivera	Partido Federal ng Pilipinas

==== Results ====
Candidate	Party	Votes	%
Leonardo Hostallero	Partido Federal ng Pilipinas	2,072	18.46
Cleo Gonzales	Independent	1,964	17.50
Byron Peralta (incumbent)	Nationalist People's Coalition	1,589	14.16
Preciosa Rivera	Partido Federal ng Pilipinas	1,507	13.43
Juliet Cataluna (incumbent)	Liberal	1,475	13.14
Juan Caballero	Nationalist People's Coalition	1,339	11.93
Rogelio Delapa	Liberal	1,278	11.39
Total		11,224	100.00

== Congressional election ==
Candidate	Party	Votes	%
Jun Gato	Nationalist People's Coalition	7,380	66.10
Marilou Cayco	Partido Federal ng Pilipinas	3,785	33.90
Total		11,165	100.00
Valid votes		11,165	97.19
Invalid/blank votes		323	2.81
Total votes		11,488	100.00
Registered voters/turnout		13,655	84.13
Nationalist People's Coalition hold			
Source: Commission on Elections

=== By municipality ===
Municipality	Gato		Cayco		Total votes	
Municipality	Votes	%	Votes	%	Total votes	
Basco	3,614	73.19	1,324	26.81	4,938	100.00
Itbayat	1,058	62.68	630	37.32	1,688	100.00
Ivana	520	51.23	495	48.77	1,015	100.00
Mahatao	794	62.23	482	37.77	1,276	100.00
Sabtang	744	61.44	467	38.56	1,211	100.00
Uyugan	650	62.68	387	37.32	1,037	100.00
Total	7,380	66.10	3,785	33.90	11,165	100.00
