= 2022 Batanes local elections =

Local elections in the Philippines

- Registered: 13,820
- Turnout: 11,801 (85.39%)
- 2022 Batanes gubernatorial election
- May 9, 2022
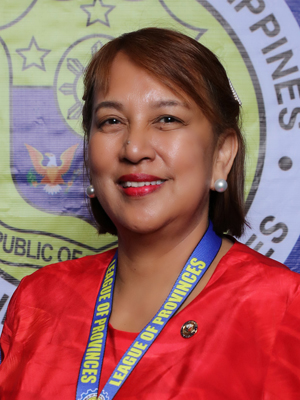
		NPC
Candidate	Malou Cayco	Telesforo Castillejos
Party	Liberal	NPC
Running mate	Ignacio Villa	Ferdie Elica
Popular vote	6,489	4,142
Percentage	61.04	38.96
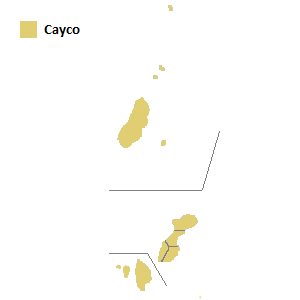
- 2022 Batanes Gubernatorial election by Municipality.
Governor before election
Malou Cayco
Liberal
Elected Governor
Malou Cayco
Liberal

Local elections were held in Batanes on May 9, 2022, as part of the 2022 Philippine general election. Voters will select candidates for all local positions: a town mayor, vice mayor and town councilors, as well as members of the Sangguniang Panlalawigan, a vice-governor, a governor and a representative for the province's at-large congressional district in the House of Representatives.

The province's election turnout is 85.39%, (34 election returns) equivalent to 11,801 of 13,820 total registered voters.

== Provincial elections ==
=== Gubernatorial election ===
Incumbent Batanes Governor Malou Cayco is seeking re-election for a third and final term against former Governor Telesforo Castillejos.

Batanes gubernatorial election
Party	Candidate	Votes	%
Liberal	Malou Cayco (Incumbent)	6,489	61.04
NPC	Telesforo Castillejos	4,142	38.96
Valid ballots		10,631	90.09
Invalid or blank votes		1,170	9.91
Total votes		11,801	100.00%

==== By municipality ====
Municipality	Cayco		Castillejos		Total votes	
Municipality	Votes	%	Votes	%	Total votes	
Basco	2,690	55.38	2,167	44.62	4,857	100.00
Itbayat	993	64.77	540	35.23	1,533	100.00
Ivana	639	67.41	309	32.59	948	100.00
Mahatao	772	67.31	375	32.69	1,147	100.00
Sabtang	757	64.87	410	35.13	1,167	100.00
Uyugan	638	65.17	341	34.83	979	100.00
Total	6,489	61.04	4,142	38.96	10,631	100.00

=== Vice gubernatorial election ===
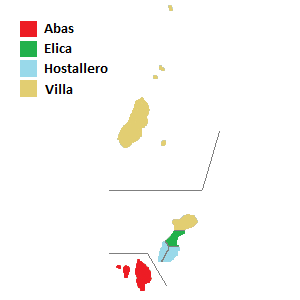
2022 Batanes Vice gubernatorial election by municipality.

Incumbent Vice Governor Ignacio Villa is seeking re-election for a second term against incumbent first provincial district board member Ferdie Elica and incumbent Ivana mayor Leonardo "Ading" Hostallero.

Batanes Vice gubernatorial election
Party	Candidate	Votes	%
Liberal	Ignacio Villa (Incumbent)	3,580	33.1
NPC	Ferdie Elica	2,877	26.6
Lakas	Leonardo "Ading" Hostallero	2,479	22.92
Reporma	Juliet Abas	1,881	17.39
Valid ballots		10,817	91.66
Invalid or blank votes		984	8.34
Total votes		11,801	100.00%

==== By municipality ====
Municipality	Villa		Elica		Hostallero		Abas		Total votes	
Municipality	Votes	%	Votes	%	Votes	%	Votes	%	Total votes	
Basco	1,748		1,606		883		663		4,900	100.00
Itbayat	690		327		308		251		1,576	100.00
Ivana	146		134		537		150		967	100.00
Mahatao	339		402		198		225		1,164	100.00
Sabtang	337		203		225		447		1,212	100.00
Uyugan	320		205		328		145		998	100.00
Total	3,580	33.1	2,877	26.6	2,479	22.92	1,881	17.39	10,817	100.00

=== Provincial board elections ===
Party	Votes	%	Seats
Liberal	10,809	36.69	3
NPC	7,324	24.86	1
Reporma	6,242	21.19	1
Lakas	5,085	17.26	1
Ex officio seats			3
Reserved seats			1
Total	29,460	100.00	10

==== 1st District ====
Municipality: Basco, Mahatao

Batanes 1st District Sangguniang Panlalawigan election
Party	Candidate	Votes	%
Liberal	Doctor Nicolas	3,188	19.27
Liberal	Ann Viola	2,730	16.5
NPC	Juan Redondo (Incumbent)	1,928	11.65
NPC	Alexander Argonza	1,860	11.24
Reporma	Rock Abad	1,745	10.55
Reporma	Benni Asa	1,405	8.49
Lakas	Winnie Martin	1,034	6.25
NPC	Roldan Cabizon	795	4.8
Lakas	Jul Balasbas	684	4.13
Lakas	Arsing Viola	643	3.89
Reporma	Guillermo Bongay	536	3.24
Total votes		16,548	100.00

==== 2nd District ====
Municipality: Itbayat, Ivana, Sabtang, Uyugan

Batanes 2nd District Sangguniang Panlalawigan election
Party	Candidate	Votes	%
Lakas	Byron Peralta	1,529	12.54
Liberal	Juliet Cataluña (Incumbent)	1,493	12.25
Reporma	Roland Cabitac	1,423	11.67
Liberal	Precy Rivera	1,375	11.28
Liberal	Priscilla Nanud	1,303	10.69
Lakas	Rogelio Delapa	1,195	9.8
NPC	Marilys Castillo	1,145	9.39
Reporma	Romeo Acebes (Incumbent)	1,133	9.29
NPC	Hedrick Cervillion	936	7.68
NPC	Juanita Acacio	660	5.41
Total votes		12,192	100.00

== Congressional election ==
Incumbent Batanes lone district representative Ciriaco “Doc” Gato Jr. is seeking re-election for a second term against Luis Abad who is the son of former Budget Secretary Florencio Abad, and former lone district representative Dina Abad.

Philippine House of Representatives election at Batanes's Lone district
Party	Candidate	Votes	%
NPC	Ciriaco Gato Jr. (Incumbent)	3,872	33.92
Liberal	Luis Abad	3,037	26.61
Reporma	Ronald Aguto Jr.	2,484	21.76
Lakas	Carlo Diasnes	2,022	17.71
Valid ballots		11,415	96.73
Invalid or blank votes		386	3.27
Total votes		11,801	100.00%

=== By municipality ===
Municipality	Gato Jr.		Abad		Aguto Jr.		Diasnes		Total votes	
Municipality	Votes	%	Votes	%	Votes	%	Votes	%	Total votes	
Basco	2,325		1,333		844		659		5,161	100.00
Itbayat	481		544		240		439		1,704	100.00
Ivana	205		166		426		226		1,023	100.00
Mahatao	361		302		355		223		1,241	100.00
Sabtang	329		337		400		184		1,250	100.00
Uyugan	171		355		219		291		1,036	100.00
Total	3,872	33.92	3,037	26.61	2,484	21.76	2,022	17.71	11,415	100.00

== Municipal elections ==
The mayor and vice mayor with the highest number of votes win the seat; they are voted separately, therefore, they may be of different parties when elected. Parties are as stated in their certificates of candidacy.

=== Basco ===
In Basco, the provincial capital, the municipal election will be contested primarily between candidates from the Liberal Party (LP), Lakas-CMD, and the Nationalist People's Coalition (NPC).

==== Mayor ====
Incumbent Basco mayor Demy Narag is running for re-election against incumbent vice mayor German "Milo" Caccam.

Basco mayoral election
Party	Candidate	Votes	%
Liberal	Milo Caccam	3,258	64.35
Lakas	Demy Narag	998	19.71
NPC	Roscoe Santana	807	15.94
Total votes		5,063	100.00
Liberal gain from Lakas			

==== Vice mayor ====
Incumbent vice mayor German "Milo" Caccam is running for mayor. The Liberal Party which is the party of Milo Caccam nominated Marvin Costales for vice mayor.

Basco vice mayoral election
Party	Candidate	Votes	%
NPC	Arlyne Velayo	1,965	40.5
Liberal	Marvin Costales	1,295	26.69
Lakas	Waldimar Viola	864	17.81
Reporma	Linda Redondo	728	15
Total votes		4,852	100.00
NPC gain from Liberal			

==== Municipal council ====
Basco municipal council elections
Party	Candidate	Votes	%
Reporma	Ankie Redondo	2,052	38.59
Independent	Jacklord Labrador	2,029	38.16
Liberal	Carla Cordel	2,017	37.93
Liberal	Will Lee "Cholo" Gabotero	1,972	37.09
Liberal	Benny Fajardo	1,877	35.30
Liberal	Paking Castillo	1,844	34.68
NPC	Joseph Guisando	1,772	33.33
Liberal	Aren Joseph Veracruz	1,713	32.22
Liberal	John Paul Castillo	1,586	29.83
Liberal	Alden Voltaire Gordo	1,585	29.81
Liberal	Roger Doplito	1,535	28.87
NPC	Romeo Puriran	1,532	28.81
Independent	Kurt Ryan Donato	1,350	25.39
NPC	Bernardita Merida	1,336	25.13
NPC	Teodora Abengaña	1,120	21.06
NPC	Robert Redondo	1,028	19.33
Lakas	Laarni Donato	935	17.59
Independent	Jamerika Klaire Tabuso	917	17.25
Lakas	Kriselda Vinalay	831	15.63
NPC	Manny Merida	795	14.95
Lakas	Chico Domingo	771	14.50
NPC	Jhun Robillos	710	13.35
NPC	Theresita Garrido	643	12.09
Lakas	Jovar Vargas	605	11.38
Lakas	Lucil Ferrer	531	9.99
Independent	Alen Antonio	453	8.52
Lakas	Lemuel Gonzales	401	7.54
Lakas	James Alina	339	6.38
Lakas	Jhoel Mirabueno	264	4.97
Total votes		34,543	

=== Itbayat ===
In Itbayat, the municipal election will be contested primarily between Independent candidates.

==== Mayor ====
Incumbent mayor Ronald Gutierrez is running for the position of vice mayor. Sabas De Sagon, the relative and namesake of Raul De Sagon runs for mayor.

Itbayat mayoral election
Party	Candidate	Votes	%
Independent	Sabas De Sagon	545	33.56
Independent	Joseph Cultura	357	21.98
NPC	Daniel De Sagon	261	16.07
Independent	Elisa Colobong	236	14.53
Independent	Reuel Ibañes	225	13.85
Total votes		1,624	100.00
Independent hold			

==== Vice mayor ====
Incumbent Itbayat mayor Ronald Gutierrez is running for vice mayor.

Itbayat vice mayoral election
Party	Candidate	Votes	%
Independent	Ferdinand Asa	880	65.33
Independent	Ronald Gutierrez	467	34.67
Total votes		1,347	100.00
Independent hold			

==== Municipal council ====
Itbayat municipal council elections
Party	Candidate	Votes	%
Independent	Cleo Gonzales	1,054	58.95
Independent	Joel Velayo	898	50.22
Independent	Dyan Gutierrez	816	45.64
Independent	Jesie Estoy	762	42.62
Independent	Zenas Labrador	746	41.72
Independent	Jonel Villa	718	40.16
NPC	Edgar Garcia	632	35.35
Independent	Gershom Gato	614	34.34
Independent	Ernesto Castillo	543	30.37
Independent	Joey Intervalo	476	26.62
Independent	Alejandria Asa	465	26.01
Independent	Ansbert Salengua	459	25.67
Independent	Alex Valiente	397	22.20
Independent	Jerry Camacho	369	20.64
Independent	Jose Alcazar Jr.	358	20.02
Independent	Pablo Alcazar Jr.	343	19.18
Independent	Emer Valiente	260	14.54
Independent	Maria Horiondo	248	13.87
NPC	Lucilo Gonzales	235	13.14
Total votes		10,393	

=== Ivana ===
In Ivana, the municipal election will be contested primarily between the Liberal Party (LP), Lakas-CMD, the Nationalist People's Coalition (NPC), and Independent candidates.

==== Mayor ====
Incumbent Ivana mayor Leonardo Hostallero is running for Vice governor in the province of Batanes and incumbent Vice mayor Romeo Emilio Fidel is running for mayor.

Ivana mayoral election
Party	Candidate	Votes	%
Independent	Celso Batallones	640	62.08
NPC	Romeo Emilio Fidel	391	37.92
Total votes		1,031	100.00
Independent gain from NUP			

==== Vice mayor ====
Incumbent vice mayor Romeo Fidel is running for mayor. The Nationalist People's Coalition which is the party of Romeo Fidel nominated Jerry Agana for vice mayor.

Ivana vice mayoral election
Party	Candidate	Votes	%
NPC	Jerry Agana	582	58.73
Lakas	Orlan Hostallero	409	41.27
Total votes		1,347	100.00
NPC gain from Independent			

==== Municipal council ====
Ivana municipal council elections
Party	Candidate	Votes	%
Independent	Christopher Cabugao	552	51.93
Liberal	Myron Valenciano	520	48.92
NPC	Jenna Mae Barcelona	457	42.99
Lakas	Oching Acebes	444	41.77
Reporma	Chris Cataluña	420	39.51
Reporma	Fredrick Zenon Cataluña	420	39.51
NPC	Alberto Viegan	420	39.51
Lakas	Galdo Pama	400	37.63
Independent	Victor Valenciano	395	37.16
Liberal	Frizian Ydel	382	35.94
Liberal	Norman James Enego	381	35.84
NPC	Roque Jerold Agana	376	35.37
Lakas	Boyet Hostallero	360	33.87
NPC	Merry Sara Calma	338	31.80
Reporma	Rita Adalla	289	27.19
NPC	Maria Teresa Javier	227	21.35
Liberal	Tirso Ebina	167	15.71
Independent	Joel Cataluña	87	8.18
Total votes		6,635	

=== Mahatao ===
In Mahatao, the municipal election will be contested primarily between the Partido para sa Demokratikong Reporma (Reporma), and the Liberal Party (LP).

==== Mayor ====
Incumbent Mahatao mayor Pedro Poncio is seeking re-election for a second term.

Mahatao mayoral election
Party	Candidate	Votes	%
Reporma	Pedro Poncio	740	61.41
Liberal	Genes Galarion	465	38.59
Total votes		1,205	100.00
Reporma hold			

==== Vice mayor ====
Incumbent vice mayor Noe Avelino Fabro is seeking re-election for a third and final term.

Mahatao vice mayoral election
Party	Candidate	Votes	%
Reporma	Noe Avelino Fabro	837	71.42
Liberal	Bobbie De Mata	335	28.58
Total votes		1,172	100.00
Reporma hold			

==== Municipal council ====
Sabtang municipal council elections
Party	Candidate	Votes	%
Reporma	Ryan Cardona	454	35.33
Reporma	Val Come	431	33.54
Liberal	Uching Tabig	402	31.28
Lakas	Willy Agunsod	374	29.11
Liberal	Itay Galindez	349	27.16
NPC	Jig Balasbas	333	25.91
Lakas	Macario Cabrito Jr.	328	25.53
Liberal	Nestor Pacuno	312	24.28
Independent	Blesilda Avanceña	311	24.20
Independent	Josie Tabuso	296	23.04
NPC	Donald Cariaso	288	22.41
Reporma	Basilio Agrezor	286	22.26
Liberal	Cesa De Mata	277	21.56
NPC	Luzviminda Cartaño	268	20.86
NPC	Joaquin Rome Carzon	266	20.70
Liberal	Tinong Raterta	249	19.38
Lakas	Anthony Galindez	248	19.30
Reporma	John Dave Ablat	248	19.30
Liberal	Homer Avanceña	242	18.83
Independent	Thomas Tabuso	240	18.68
Reporma	Victor Carzon	238	18.52
Reporma	Joel Fabre	236	18.37
Independent	Emma Garcia	191	14.86
Liberal	Denan Portez	191	14.86
NPC	Jovie Agresor	178	13.85
Liberal	Kaven Busangilan	175	13.62
Lakas	Olive Rarela	171	13.31
Reporma	Rosemary Rareza	162	12.61
Independent	Lino Galindez	160	12.45
NPC	Nicanor Paco	117	9.11
NPC	Ramiro Fabre	115	8.95
Lakas	Romy Aguasa	112	8.72
Independent	Max Gero	88	6.85
Lakas	Chiton Mergal	80	6.23
Total votes		8,416	

=== Sabtang ===
In Sabtang, the municipal election will be contested primarily between the Partido para sa Demokratikong Reporma (Reporma), the Liberal Party (LP), and the Nationalist People's Coalition (NPC).

==== Mayor ====
Incumbent Sabtang mayor Maxilindo Emilio Babalo is ineliglible to run for another term. Prescila Babalo, a relative of Maxilindo will attempt to replace his position.

Sabtang mayoral election
Party	Candidate	Votes	%
Reporma	Prescila Babalo	480	38.74
Liberal	Gomer Halago	330	26.63
NPC	Ace Candel	307	24.78
Lakas	Mariano Gabito	122	9.85
Total votes		1,239	100.00
Reporma hold			

==== Vice mayor ====
Incumbent vice mayor Manjing Alavado is seeking re-election for a second term.

Sabtang vice mayoral election
Party	Candidate	Votes	%
Reporma	Memen Ladreza	583	47.94
Liberal	Manjing Alavado	451	37.09
NPC	Harold Gabotero	182	14.97
Total votes		1,216	100.00
Reporma gain from Liberal			

==== Municipal council ====
Sabtang municipal council elections
Party	Candidate	Votes	%
Independent	Roda Alavado	619	48.32
Liberal	Tita Neyala	535	41.76
Liberal	Jerold Figura	501	39.11
Liberal	John Kelvin Calvez	464	36.22
Reporma	Jepoy Alavado	458	35.75
Reporma	Romy Gabilo	448	34.97
Reporma	Ernie Canela	429	33.49
Liberal	Harold Calvez	428	33.41
Reporma	Roger Hubayan	425	33.18
NPC	Roly Castro	399	31.15
Reporma	Marcial Almeyda	398	31.07
Reporma	Bong Enego	374	29.20
NPC	Zeddie Beronque	374	29.20
Reporma	Julia Horcajo	359	28.02
NPC	Eden Cultura	357	27.87
Reporma	Nelson Gabilo	339	26.46
NPC	Amby Villanueva	330	25.76
Liberal	Rudy Gecha	306	23.89
NPC	Roberto Trillana	297	23.19
NPC	Maring Cielo	271	21.16
NPC	Norma Almeyda	241	18.81
Liberal	Johnny Aumentado	209	16.32
NPC	Kok Cultura	199	15.53
Liberal	Kane Gecha	105	8.20
Liberal	Dong Fabres	92	7.18
Total votes		8,957	

=== Uyugan ===
In Uyugan, the municipal election will be contested primarily between the Liberal Party (LP), and Lakas-CMD.

==== Mayor ====
Incumbent Uyugan mayor Jonathan Nanud is seeking re-election for a third and final term.

Uyugan mayoral election
Party	Candidate	Votes	%
Liberal	Jonathan Nanud	545	53.48
Lakas	Fely Batin	407	39.94
NPC	Efy Abad	67	6.58
Total votes		1,019	100.00
Liberal hold			

==== Vice mayor ====
Incumbent vice mayor Baldo Baldomar is seeking re-election for a second term.

Uyugan vice mayoral election
Party	Candidate	Votes	%
Liberal	Argel Horitz	557	56.66
Lakas	Baldo Baldomar	426	43.34
Total votes		983	100.00
Liberal gain from Lakas			

==== Municipal council ====
Uyugan municipal council elections
Party	Candidate	Votes	%
Lakas	Bloom Ortiz	420	39.36
NPC	Ancieto Nanud	418	39.18
Independent	Antonio Bogador	401	37.58
Lakas	Mariano Garibay	390	36.55
Liberal	Andy Ybay	377	35.33
Liberal	Jerwin Joji Cobico	366	34.30
Liberal	Bernard Delos Santod	339	31.77
Liberal	Ralph Jordan Ebalin	330	30.93
Liberal	Joseph Ybay	324	30.37
Lakas	Ciano Adami	323	30.27
Lakas	Dick Ybay	310	29.05
Lakas	Alice Baldomar	296	27.74
NPC	Neo Batin	286	26.80
NPC	Jhona Baliday	266	25.40
Liberal	Aaron Neil Nanud	266	24.93
Liberal	Maria Aileen Cabugao	254	23.81
NPC	Roxanne Mae Carpiso	249	23.34
Lakas	Brian Dave Adami	232	21.74
Liberal	Jeffrey Cobico	230	21.56
Lakas	Harold Ydel	223	20.90
NPC	Misericordia Arca	218	20.43
Lakas	Mayette Ybay	198	18.56
NPC	Aquiles Ybay	193	18.09
NPC	Isabel Ofelia Cobico	167	15.65
Total votes		7,081	
