= 2010 Cagayan Valley local elections =

Local elections were held in Cagayan Valley on May 10, 2010, as part of the 2010 Philippine general election.

== Batanes ==
=== Governor ===
Incumbent Governor Telesforo Castillejos of the Lakas–Kampi–CMD ran for re-election to a second term, but was defeated by former governor Vicente Gato of the Liberal Party.

| Candidate | Party | Votes | % |
|---|---|---|---|
| Vicente Gato | Liberal Party | 3,413 | 41.51 |
| Telesforo Castillejos | Lakas–Kampi–CMD | 2,466 | 29.99 |
| William Agsunod | Nacionalista Party | 2,343 | 28.50 |
| Total | | 8,222 | 100.00 |
| Valid votes | | 8,222 | 97.04 |
| Invalid/blank votes | | 251 | 2.96 |
| Total votes | | 8,473 | 100.00 |
| Liberal Party gain from Lakas–Kampi–CMD | | | |
Source: Commission on Elections

=== Vice Governor ===
Incumbent Vice Governor William Agsunod of the Nacionalista Party ran for Governor of Batanes. The Nacionalista Party nominated provincial board member Milagros Juliet Abas, who was defeated by provincial board member Ferdinand Elica of Lakas–Kampi–CMD.

| Candidate | Party | Votes | % |
|---|---|---|---|
| Ferdinand Elica | Lakas–Kampi–CMD | 2,856 | 36.44 |
| Milagros Juliet Abas | Nacionalista Party | 2,632 | 33.58 |
| German Caccam | Liberal Party | 2,349 | 29.97 |
| Total | | 7,837 | 100.00 |
| Valid votes | | 7,837 | 92.49 |
| Invalid/blank votes | | 636 | 7.51 |
| Total votes | | 8,473 | 100.00 |
| Lakas–Kampi–CMD gain from Nationalist People's Coalition | | | |
Source: Commission on Elections

=== Provincial Board ===
The Batanes Provincial Board is composed of 10 board members, 6 of whom are elected.

| Party | Votes | % | Seats |
|---|---|---|---|
| Liberal Party | 8,843 | 40.01 | 3 |
| Lakas–Kampi–CMD | 6,301 | 28.51 | 1 |
| Nacionalista Party | 6,219 | 28.14 | 2 |
| Independent | 737 | 3.33 | 0 |
| Total | 22,100 | 100.00 | 6 |
| Total votes | 8,563 | – | |
Source: Commission on Elections

==== 1st district ====
| Candidate | Party | Votes | % |
|---|---|---|---|
| Flinton Abad | Liberal Party | 2,043 | 17.63 |
| Florante Castillo | Liberal Party | 1,716 | 14.81 |
| Alexander Argonza | Lakas–Kampi–CMD | 1,348 | 11.63 |
| Albert Calagui | Lakas–Kampi–CMD | 1,294 | 11.17 |
| Niño Carlo Castillejos | Lakas–Kampi–CMD | 1,249 | 10.78 |
| Catherine de Mata | Liberal Party | 1,179 | 10.17 |
| Vicenta Hidalgo | Nacionalista Party | 748 | 6.45 |
| Pedro Horcajo | Independent | 737 | 6.36 |
| Ramon Ponce | Nacionalista Party | 708 | 6.11 |
| Leonila Mirabueno | Nacionalista Party | 566 | 4.88 |
| Total | | 11,588 | 100.00 |
| Total votes | | 4,345 | – |
Source: Commission on Elections

==== 2nd district ====
| Candidate | Party | Votes | % |
|---|---|---|---|
| Ignacio Villa | Nacionalista Party | 1,529 | 14.55 |
| Ramonito Imperial | Liberal Party | 1,521 | 14.47 |
| Rogelio Delapa | Nacionalista Party | 1,417 | 13.48 |
| Pedro Valiente | Nacionalista Party | 1,251 | 11.90 |
| Juliet Cataluña | Liberal Party | 1,203 | 11.44 |
| Raul de Sagon | Liberal Party | 1,181 | 11.23 |
| Johnard Baldomar | Lakas–Kampi–CMD | 1,000 | 9.51 |
| Harold Gabotero | Lakas–Kampi–CMD | 748 | 7.12 |
| Nicanor Doplito | Lakas–Kampi–CMD | 662 | 6.30 |
| Total | | 10,512 | 100.00 |
| Total votes | | 4,218 | – |
Source: Commission on Elections

== Cagayan ==
=== Governor ===
Incumbent Governor Alvaro Antonio of the Lakas–Kampi–CMD won re-election to a second term.

| Candidate | Party | Votes | % |
|---|---|---|---|
| Alvaro Antonio | Lakas–Kampi–CMD | 248,446 | 57.99 |
| Manuel Mamba | Liberal Party | 176,921 | 41.29 |
| Joven delos Santos | Independent | 3,095 | 0.72 |
| Total | | 428,462 | 100.00 |
| Valid votes | | 428,462 | 91.99 |
| Invalid/blank votes | | 37,290 | 8.01 |
| Total votes | | 465,752 | 100.00 |
| Lakas–Kampi–CMD hold | | | |
Source: Commission on Elections

=== Vice Governor ===
Incumbent Vice Governor Leonides Fausto of the Nacionalista Party won re-election to a second term.

| Candidate | Party | Votes | % |
|---|---|---|---|
| Leonides Fausto | Nacionalista Party | 251,936 | 68.07 |
| Harold Tamargo | Liberal Party | 118,189 | 31.93 |
| Total | | 370,125 | 100.00 |
| Valid votes | | 370,125 | 79.47 |
| Invalid/blank votes | | 95,627 | 20.53 |
| Total votes | | 465,752 | 100.00 |
| Nacionalista Party hold | | | |
Source: Commission on Elections

=== Provincial Board ===
The Cagayan Provincial Board is composed of 13 board members, 10 of whom are elected.

| Party | Votes | % | Seats |
|---|---|---|---|
| Lakas–Kampi–CMD | 427,093 | 39.50 | 5 |
| Liberal Party | 281,300 | 26.02 | 1 |
| Nacionalista Party | 118,906 | 11.00 | 2 |
| Nationalist People's Coalition | 72,403 | 6.70 | 1 |
| Independent | 181,449 | 16.78 | 1 |
| Total | 1,081,151 | 100.00 | 10 |
| Total votes | 471,973 | – | |
Source: Commission on Elections

==== 1st district ====
| Candidate | Party | Votes | % |
|---|---|---|---|
| Jean Alphonse Ponce | Independent | 65,968 | 18.58 |
| Maria Olivia Pascual | Lakas–Kampi–CMD | 63,318 | 17.83 |
| Romeo Garcia | Lakas–Kampi–CMD | 45,078 | 12.70 |
| Ronnel Foronda | Liberal Party | 43,069 | 12.13 |
| Angelo Luis | Lakas–Kampi–CMD | 39,598 | 11.15 |
| Virginia Loreta Herrero | Liberal Party | 32,594 | 9.18 |
| Deogracias Cortez | Liberal Party | 17,471 | 4.92 |
| Veronico Agatep | Independent | 17,364 | 4.89 |
| Armando Cortes | Independent | 16,714 | 4.71 |
| Jane Vargas | Independent | 13,871 | 3.91 |
| Total | | 355,045 | 100.00 |
| Total votes | | 167,545 | – |
Source: Commission on Elections

==== 2nd district ====
| Candidate | Party | Votes | % |
|---|---|---|---|
| Melvin Vargas Jr. | Lakas–Kampi–CMD | 79,225 | 30.77 |
| Joseph Llopis | Lakas–Kampi–CMD | 47,905 | 18.61 |
| Jessie Usita | Nationalist People's Coalition | 38,626 | 15.00 |
| Vilmer Viloria | Nationalist People's Coalition | 33,777 | 13.12 |
| Estrella Fernandez | Lakas–Kampi–CMD | 33,152 | 12.88 |
| Alejandro Pulido | Independent | 20,849 | 8.10 |
| Fernando Asperela | Independent | 3,928 | 1.53 |
| Total | | 257,462 | 100.00 |
| Total votes | | 131,484 | – |
Source: Commission on Elections

==== 3rd district ====
| Candidate | Party | Votes | % |
|---|---|---|---|
| Mila Catabay-Lauigan | Lakas–Kampi–CMD | 70,354 | 15.01 |
| Victor Perez | Liberal Party | 62,339 | 13.30 |
| Washington Taguinod | Nacionalista Party | 60,709 | 12.95 |
| Winnoco Abraham | Nacionalista Party | 58,197 | 12.42 |
| Raymund Guzman | Liberal Party | 50,508 | 10.78 |
| Julio Liggayu | Lakas–Kampi–CMD | 48,463 | 10.34 |
| Rodolfo Alvarado | Liberal Party | 42,000 | 8.96 |
| Oscar Pagulayan | Independent | 34,346 | 7.33 |
| Romulo Arugay | Liberal Party | 33,319 | 7.11 |
| Gerard Baquiran | Independent | 8,409 | 1.79 |
| Total | | 468,644 | 100.00 |
| Total votes | | 172,944 | – |
Source: Commission on Elections

== Isabela ==
=== Governor ===
Incumbent Governor Grace Padaca of the Liberal Party ran for re-election to a second term, but was defeated by representative Bojie Dy of Lakas–Kampi–CMD.

| Candidate | Party | Votes | % |
|---|---|---|---|
| Bojie Dy | Lakas–Kampi–CMD | 274,757 | 50.09 |
| Grace Padaca | Liberal Party | 271,319 | 49.47 |
| Lilia Uy | Independent | 2,408 | 0.44 |
| Total | | 548,484 | 100.00 |
| Valid votes | | 548,484 | 94.29 |
| Invalid/blank votes | | 33,216 | 5.71 |
| Total votes | | 581,700 | 100.00 |
| Lakas–Kampi–CMD gain from Liberal Party | | | |
Source: Commission on Elections

=== Vice Governor ===
Incumbent Vice Governor Ramon Reyes of Bigkis Pinoy ran for the House of Representatives in Isabela's 1st district. Bigkis Pinoy nominated representative Edwin Uy, who was defeated by representative Rodolfo Albano III of Lakas–Kampi–CMD.

| Candidate | Party | Votes | % |
|---|---|---|---|
| Rodolfo Albano III | Lakas–Kampi–CMD | 303,421 | 58.06 |
| Edwin Uy | Bigkis Pinoy | 219,143 | 41.94 |
| Total | | 522,564 | 100.00 |
| Valid votes | | 522,564 | 89.83 |
| Invalid/blank votes | | 59,136 | 10.17 |
| Total votes | | 581,700 | 100.00 |
| Lakas–Kampi–CMD gain from Bigkis Pinoy | | | |
Source: Commission on Elections

=== Provincial Board ===
The Isabela Provincial Board is composed of 15 board members, 10 of whom are elected.

| Party | Votes | % | Seats |
|---|---|---|---|
| Bigkis Pinoy | 300,812 | 29.07 | 4 |
| Nationalist People's Coalition | 277,009 | 26.77 | 3 |
| Nacionalista Party | 171,232 | 16.55 | 0 |
| Lakas–Kampi–CMD | 114,372 | 11.05 | 2 |
| Pwersa ng Masang Pilipino | 34,051 | 3.29 | 0 |
| Lapiang Manggagawa | 32,240 | 3.12 | 0 |
| Independent | 105,187 | 10.16 | 1 |
| Total | 1,034,903 | 100.00 | 10 |
| Total votes | 581,700 | – | |
Source: Commission on Elections

==== 1st district ====
| Candidate | Party | Votes | % |
|---|---|---|---|
| Ric Justice Angobung | Lakas–Kampi–CMD | 60,768 | 20.94 |
| Rolando Tugade | Lakas–Kampi–CMD | 53,604 | 18.47 |
| Kiryll Bello | Bigkis Pinoy | 49,231 | 16.96 |
| Rodolfo Añes | Nacionalista Party | 48,463 | 16.70 |
| Mercedes Uy | Nacionalista Party | 47,357 | 16.32 |
| Jesus Cruz Jr. | Pwersa ng Masang Pilipino | 30,787 | 10.61 |
| Total | | 290,210 | 100.00 |
| Total votes | | 151,699 | – |
Source: Commission on Elections

==== 2nd district ====
| Candidate | Party | Votes | % |
|---|---|---|---|
| Mitzi Cumigad | Bigkis Pinoy | 62,314 | 26.98 |
| Cesar Purugganan | Nationalist People's Coalition | 53,768 | 23.28 |
| Ma Amethyst Costales | Nacionalista Party | 38,780 | 16.79 |
| Emelito Velasco | Lapiang Manggagawa | 32,240 | 13.96 |
| Ryan Anthony Diampoc | Bigkis Pinoy | 31,021 | 13.43 |
| Nestor Cunanan | Independent | 8,440 | 3.65 |
| Gregorio Martinez | Independent | 4,415 | 1.91 |
| Total | | 230,978 | 100.00 |
| Total votes | | 159,592 | – |
Source: Commission on Elections

==== 3rd district ====
| Candidate | Party | Votes | % |
|---|---|---|---|
| Jaime Atayde | Bigkis Pinoy | 64,103 | 17.94 |
| Karen Abuan | Nationalist People's Coalition | 63,708 | 17.83 |
| Manuel Alejandro | Independent | 45,266 | 12.67 |
| Ysmael Atienza | Nationalist People's Coalition | 41,247 | 11.54 |
| Ruby Milagros Cortes-Damian | Independent | 41,088 | 11.50 |
| Randolph Joseph Arreola | Nacionalista Party | 36,632 | 10.25 |
| Michael John Delmendo | Nationalist People's Coalition | 36,424 | 10.19 |
| Ralph Maloloyon | Bigkis Pinoy | 19,669 | 5.50 |
| Marcial Benitez | Independent | 5,978 | 1.67 |
| Ashley Silao | Pwersa ng Masang Pilipino | 3,264 | 0.91 |
| Total | | 357,379 | 100.00 |
| Total votes | | 158,687 | – |
Source: Commission on Elections

==== 4th district ====
| Candidate | Party | Votes | % |
|---|---|---|---|
| Leoncio Kiat | Nationalist People's Coalition | 48,769 | 31.19 |
| Mojamito Libunao Jr. | Bigkis Pinoy | 42,651 | 27.28 |
| Mercedes Vizcarra | Nationalist People's Coalition | 33,093 | 21.17 |
| Gaylord Gumpal | Bigkis Pinoy | 31,823 | 20.36 |
| Total | | 156,336 | 100.00 |
| Total votes | | 111,722 | – |
Source: Commission on Elections

== Nueva Vizcaya ==
=== Governor ===
Incumbent Governor Luisa Cuaresma of the Nacionalista Party won re-election to a third term.

| Candidate | Party | Votes | % |
|---|---|---|---|
| Luisa Cuaresma | Nacionalista Party | 108,182 | 65.97 |
| Florante Gerdan | Liberal Party | 55,078 | 33.59 |
| Editha Taylan | Independent | 721 | 0.44 |
| Total | | 163,981 | 100.00 |
| Valid votes | | 163,981 | 93.64 |
| Invalid/blank votes | | 11,137 | 6.36 |
| Total votes | | 175,118 | 100.00 |
| Nacionalista Party hold | | | |
Source: Commission on Elections

=== Vice Governor ===
Incumbent Vice Governor Jose Gambito of the Nacionalista Party won re-election to a third term.

| Candidate | Party | Votes | % |
|---|---|---|---|
| Jose Gambito | Nacionalista Party | 93,016 | 58.66 |
| Patricio Dumlao Jr. | Lakas–Kampi–CMD | 64,584 | 40.73 |
| Gabriel Uy | Independent | 974 | 0.61 |
| Total | | 158,574 | 100.00 |
| Valid votes | | 158,574 | 90.55 |
| Invalid/blank votes | | 16,544 | 9.45 |
| Total votes | | 175,118 | 100.00 |
| Nacionalista Party hold | | | |
Source: Commission on Elections

=== Provincial Board ===
The Nueva Vizcaya Provincial Board is composed of 14 board members, 10 of whom are elected.

| Party | Votes | % | Seats |
|---|---|---|---|
| Nacionalista Party | 375,948 | 58.36 | 7 |
| Liberal Party | 216,966 | 33.68 | 3 |
| Independent | 51,289 | 7.96 | 0 |
| Total | 644,203 | 100.00 | 10 |
| Total votes | 175,118 | – | |
Source: Commission on Elections

==== 1st district ====
| Candidate | Party | Votes | % |
|---|---|---|---|
| Efren Quiben | Nacionalista Party | 45,193 | 14.87 |
| Donior Tidang | Nacionalista Party | 44,803 | 14.74 |
| Emmarina Balgos | Nacionalista Party | 43,578 | 14.34 |
| Pepito Balgos | Liberal Party | 40,961 | 13.48 |
| Edgar Llowelyn Daniel III | Nacionalista Party | 32,070 | 10.55 |
| Jose Tubayan | Nacionalista Party | 29,652 | 9.76 |
| Carlito Bantayan | Liberal Party | 20,153 | 6.63 |
| Jose Tiu | Liberal Party | 14,201 | 4.67 |
| Porfirio Yasay Jr. | Liberal Party | 12,474 | 4.10 |
| Aliza Ria Morales | Independent | 8,578 | 2.82 |
| Rustico Gagate | Liberal Party | 6,503 | 2.14 |
| Eufremio Reñeda | Independent | 3,375 | 1.11 |
| Martes Mayos | Independent | 2,394 | 0.79 |
| Total | | 303,935 | 100.00 |
| Total votes | | 87,297 | – |
Source: Commission on Elections

==== 2nd district ====
| Candidate | Party | Votes | % |
|---|---|---|---|
| Epifanio Lamberto Galima | Nacionalista Party | 53,122 | 15.61 |
| Maybelle Blossom Dumlao | Nacionalista Party | 46,168 | 13.57 |
| Santiago Dickson | Liberal Party | 44,651 | 13.12 |
| Filma Perez | Liberal Party | 41,796 | 12.28 |
| Johnny Liban | Nacionalista Party | 30,125 | 8.85 |
| Perfecto Martinez Jr. | Nacionalista Party | 29,313 | 8.61 |
| Prescilla Marcos | Liberal Party | 23,226 | 6.83 |
| Jose Evangelista | Independent | 22,227 | 6.53 |
| Wilfredo Pulido | Nacionalista Party | 21,924 | 6.44 |
| Noli Bautista | Liberal Party | 13,001 | 3.82 |
| Lope Padilla | Independent | 9,278 | 2.73 |
| Ma. Rizza Jane Belingon | Independent | 2,554 | 0.75 |
| Myrna Obaldo | Independent | 1,235 | 0.36 |
| Charlemagne Fomukao | Independent | 832 | 0.24 |
| Jingiver Juliano | Independent | 816 | 0.24 |
| Total | | 340,268 | 100.00 |
| Total votes | | 87,821 | – |
Source: Commission on Elections

== Quirino ==
=== Governor ===
Incumbent Governor Dakila Cua of Lakas–Kampi–CMD ran for the House of Representatives in Quirino's lone district. Lakas–Kampi–CMD nominated Cua's father, representative Junie Cua, who won the election.

| Candidate | Party | Votes | % |
|---|---|---|---|
| Junie Cua | Lakas–Kampi–CMD | 62,802 | 83.11 |
| Pedro Bacani | Nacionalista Party | 11,621 | 15.38 |
| Dante Valencia | Independent | 1,143 | 1.51 |
| Total | | 75,566 | 100.00 |
| Valid votes | | 75,566 | 96.85 |
| Invalid/blank votes | | 2,459 | 3.15 |
| Total votes | | 78,025 | 100.00 |
| Lakas–Kampi–CMD hold | | | |
Source: Commission on Elections

=== Vice Governor ===
Incumbent Vice Governor Pasencia Bacani of the Nacionalista Party ran for the Quirino Provincial Board in the 1st district. The Nacionalista Party nominated Cabarroguis mayor David Richard Longid, who was defeated by Diffun mayor May Calaunan of the Liberal Party.

| Candidate | Party | Votes | % |
|---|---|---|---|
| May Calaunan | Liberal Party | 37,218 | 52.16 |
| David Richard Longid | Nacionalista Party | 26,218 | 36.75 |
| Homer Bueno | Independent | 7,911 | 11.09 |
| Total | | 71,347 | 100.00 |
| Valid votes | | 71,347 | 91.44 |
| Invalid/blank votes | | 6,678 | 8.56 |
| Total votes | | 78,025 | 100.00 |
| Liberal Party gain from Nacionalista Party | | | |
Source: Commission on Elections

=== Provincial Board ===
The Quirino Provincial Board is composed of 12 board members, 8 of whom are elected.

| Party | Votes | % | Seats |
|---|---|---|---|
| Lakas–Kampi–CMD | 139,026 | 63.96 | 6 |
| Liberal Party | 58,735 | 27.02 | 2 |
| Nacionalista Party | 19,594 | 9.01 | 0 |
| Total | 217,355 | 100.00 | 8 |
| Total votes | 78,025 | – | |
Source: Commission on Elections

==== 1st district ====
| Candidate | Party | Votes | % |
|---|---|---|---|
| Linda Dacmay | Lakas–Kampi–CMD | 20,832 | 19.63 |
| Alegre Ylanan | Lakas–Kampi–CMD | 17,583 | 16.57 |
| Perla Olay | Liberal Party | 17,238 | 16.25 |
| Edward Salvador | Lakas–Kampi–CMD | 13,561 | 12.78 |
| Pasencia Bacani | Nacionalista Party | 12,329 | 11.62 |
| Leonard Martin | Lakas–Kampi–CMD | 11,873 | 11.19 |
| Gerry Miguel | Liberal Party | 11,338 | 10.68 |
| Vicente Toring | Nacionalista Party | 1,358 | 1.28 |
| Total | | 106,112 | 100.00 |
| Total votes | | 38,126 | – |
Source: Commission on Elections

==== 2nd district ====
| Candidate | Party | Votes | % |
|---|---|---|---|
| Julius Caesar Vaquilar | Liberal Party | 21,945 | 19.73 |
| Pedro Madarang | Lakas–Kampi–CMD | 19,636 | 17.65 |
| Jerry Pagbilao | Lakas–Kampi–CMD | 19,315 | 17.36 |
| James Aduca Sr. | Lakas–Kampi–CMD | 18,191 | 16.35 |
| Ceferino Parungao | Lakas–Kampi–CMD | 18,035 | 16.21 |
| Joselito Sulio | Liberal Party | 8,214 | 7.38 |
| Rimbao Gumangan | Nacionalista Party | 5,907 | 5.31 |
| Total | | 111,243 | 100.00 |
| Total votes | | 39,899 | – |
Source: Commission on Elections

== Santiago ==
=== Mayor ===
Incumbent Mayor Amelita Navarro of Lakas–Kampi–CMD won re-election to a third term.

| Candidate | Party | Votes | % |
|---|---|---|---|
| Amelita Navarro | Lakas–Kampi–CMD | 28,253 | 48.19 |
| Armando Tan | Liberal Party | 22,755 | 38.81 |
| Anthony Miranda | Pwersa ng Masang Pilipino | 5,425 | 9.25 |
| Edison Tan | Independent | 1,063 | 1.81 |
| Amy Navarro | Independent | 629 | 1.07 |
| Dan Antonio | Independent | 229 | 0.39 |
| Emma Navarro | Independent | 229 | 0.39 |
| Samuel Navarro | Independent | 47 | 0.08 |
| Total | | 58,630 | 100.00 |
| Valid votes | | 58,630 | 96.07 |
| Invalid/blank votes | | 2,399 | 3.93 |
| Total votes | | 61,029 | 100.00 |
| Lakas–Kampi–CMD hold | | | |
Source: Commission on Elections

=== Vice Mayor ===
Incumbent Vice Mayor Alvin Abaya of Lakas–Kampi–CMD won re-election to a second term.

| Candidate | Party | Votes | % |
|---|---|---|---|
| Alvin Abaya | Lakas–Kampi–CMD | 31,562 | 56.07 |
| Jose Romeo dela Cruz | Liberal Party | 24,731 | 43.93 |
| Total | | 56,293 | 100.00 |
| Valid votes | | 56,293 | 92.24 |
| Invalid/blank votes | | 4,736 | 7.76 |
| Total votes | | 61,029 | 100.00 |
| Lakas–Kampi–CMD hold | | | |
Source: Commission on Elections

=== City Council ===
The Santiago City Council is composed of 13 councilors, 10 of whom are elected.

| Party | Votes | % | Seats |
|---|---|---|---|
| Lakas–Kampi–CMD | 294,647 | 60.99 | 8 |
| Liberal Party | 165,903 | 34.34 | 2 |
| Pwersa ng Masang Pilipino | 9,684 | 2.00 | 0 |
| Nacionalista Party | 9,377 | 1.94 | 0 |
| Independent | 3,504 | 0.73 | 0 |
| Total | 483,115 | 100.00 | 10 |
| Total votes | 61,029 | – | |
Source: Commission on Elections

| Candidate | Party | Votes | % |
|---|---|---|---|
| Paul de Jesus | Lakas–Kampi–CMD | 37,968 | 7.86 |
| Victorio Miranda Jr. | Lakas–Kampi–CMD | 31,705 | 6.56 |
| Celine Jeanne Siquian | Lakas–Kampi–CMD | 31,521 | 6.52 |
| Kathrina Sable | Lakas–Kampi–CMD | 31,517 | 6.52 |
| Orlando Chan | Lakas–Kampi–CMD | 29,930 | 6.20 |
| Brenda Ragsac-Luna | Lakas–Kampi–CMD | 29,853 | 6.18 |
| Nicasio Bautista III | Lakas–Kampi–CMD | 28,895 | 5.98 |
| Arlene Jane Alvarez-Reyes | Liberal Party | 27,892 | 5.77 |
| Augusto Sarangaya | Lakas–Kampi–CMD | 27,553 | 5.70 |
| Marcelino Cabucana Jr. | Liberal Party | 26,948 | 5.58 |
| Maurice Navarro | Lakas–Kampi–CMD | 23,886 | 4.94 |
| Nelia Natividad | Lakas–Kampi–CMD | 21,819 | 4.52 |
| Paul Silverio | Liberal Party | 19,302 | 4.00 |
| Napoleon Roque | Liberal Party | 15,464 | 3.20 |
| Socorro Navarro | Liberal Party | 14,702 | 3.04 |
| Montecarlo Salazar | Liberal Party | 13,241 | 2.74 |
| Ricardo Cutchon | Liberal Party | 13,115 | 2.71 |
| Modesto Cabanos III | Liberal Party | 12,588 | 2.61 |
| Rogelio Marzan | Liberal Party | 12,493 | 2.59 |
| Eufracia Gonzales | Liberal Party | 10,158 | 2.10 |
| Jimmy Vic Elardo | Nacionalista Party | 5,213 | 1.08 |
| Andy de Leon | Pwersa ng Masang Pilipino | 5,105 | 1.06 |
| Benjamin Valdez | Pwersa ng Masang Pilipino | 4,579 | 0.95 |
| Rodolfo Villano | Nacionalista Party | 2,901 | 0.60 |
| Nestor Chavez | Independent | 1,598 | 0.33 |
| Paul Barrera | Independent | 1,457 | 0.30 |
| Muhammad Ramos | Nacionalista Party | 1,263 | 0.26 |
| Alfred Sabado | Independent | 449 | 0.09 |
| Total | | 483,115 | 100.00 |
| Total votes | | 61,029 | – |
Source: Commission on Elections
