= 2026 Batanes's at-large congressional district special election =

Special election for a Philippine House of Representatives seat

- November 28, 2026

Batanes's at-large congressional district Triggered by death of the incumbent
- Registered: 13,655

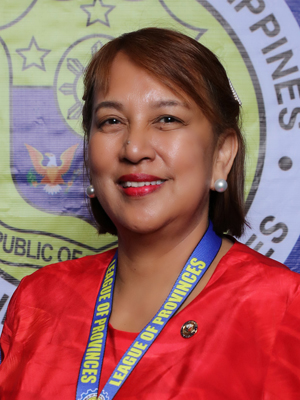

Candidate	Luis Abad	Marilou Cayco
Party	Liberal	PFP
Candidate	Edward de Sagon	John Gato
Party	Independent	NPC
- Results per secondary-level local government unit
House representative before election
Jun Gato
NPC
Elected House representative
TBD

A special election will be held in Batanes's at-large congressional district on November 28, 2026, to fill the district's vacant seat in the House of Representatives of the Philippines for the remainder of the 20th Congress.

The vacancy arose when Jun Gato, the incumbent, died due to cardiac arrest on September 21, 2026. This will be the latest special election held for a legislative seat in the province of Batanes since 1911, as well as the third to be held during the 20th Congress of the Philippines.

== Background ==
Jun Gato was first elected as representative under the Nationalist People's Coalition (NPC) in the 2019 House elections. Gato defeated former Secretary of Budget and Management and representative Florencio Abad by a close margin. Gato was narrowly re-elected for a second term in the 2022 election, defeating Abad's son, Luis. Gato was re-elected in the 2025 election for a third and final term by a wide margin, defeating Batanes governor Marilou Cayco. Gato died on September 21, 2026, at the age of 66 due to cardiac arrest.

On late September, Commission on Elections (COMELEC) chairman George Garcia announced that they had scheduled the special election on November 28.

=== District overview ===
Map of Batanes showing its location within the Philippines

Batanes's at-large district comprises the entire province of Batanes. According to official COMELEC data from the 2025 midterm elections, the district had 13,655 registered voters.

== Electoral system ==
The House of Representatives is elected via parallel voting system, with 80% of seats elected from congressional districts, and 20% from the party-list system. Each district sends one representative to the House of Representatives. An election to the seat is via first-past-the-post, in which the candidate with the most votes, whether or not one has a majority, wins the seat.

After the Hagedorn vs. House of Representatives decision by the Supreme Court in 2025, the COMELEC no longer has to wait for a congressional resolution to call for a special election. This was after the approval of Republic Act No. 7166, supposedly removed the condition of the chamber informing the commission of the vacancy, but the COMELEC still had always waited on the chamber's resolution before scheduling a special election.

Meanwhile, according to Republic Act No. 8295, should only one candidate file to run in the special election, the COMELEC will declare that candidate as the winner and will no longer hold the election.

== Calendar ==
The COMELEC published the following calendar for this election:

- Filing of candidacies: October 14 to 16, 2026
- Gun ban and election period: October 29 to December 13, 2026
- Campaign period: October 29 to November 26, 2026
- Liquor and campaign ban: November 27 to 28, 2026
- Election day: November 28, 2026
- Deadline of filing contributions and expenditures: December 28, 2026

== Candidates ==
The COMELEC set the filing of the certificates of candidacy from October 14 to 16, 2026.

- Luis Abad (Liberal Party), 2022 runner-up candidate and son of former representatives Florencio Abad and Henedina Abad
- Marilou Cayco (Partido Federal ng Pilipinas), 2025 runner-up candidate and former Governor of Batanes
- Edward de Sagon, (Independent) retired Commodore, Philippine Navy
- John Gato (Nationalist People's Coalition), retired government employee and brother of Jun Gato

== Campaigning ==
The COMELEC expected that the special election will be a tight race, with the winner getting around 2,700 votes.

== Endorsements ==
Luis Abad (Liberal)

National executive officials

- Bam Aquino, Senator of the Philippines (2013–2019, 2025–present), Chairperson of the National Youth Congress (2003–2006), and Commissioner (2001–2003)
- Kiko Pangilinan, Presidential Assistant for Food Security and Agricultural Modernization (2014–2015), Senator of the Philippines (2001–2013, 2016–2022, 2025–present), and Member of the Quezon City Council from the 4th district (1988–1992)
- Leni Robredo, 14th Vice President of the Philippines (2016–2022), Member of the Philippine House of Representatives from Camarines Sur's 3rd district (2013–2016), and 19th Mayor of Naga, Camarines Sur (2025–present)

Philippine Congress

- Risa Hontiveros, Senator of the Philippines (2016–present) and Member of the Philippine House of Representatives for Akbayan (2004–2010)
- Erin Tañada, Deputy Speaker of the House of Representatives of the Philippines (2010–2013), Member of the Philippine House of Representatives from Quezon's 4th district (2004–2013), and candidate for Representative in the 2025 election as the Mamamayang Liberal party-list's third nominee

== Results ==
2026 Philippine House of Representatives special election in Batanes's at-large congressional district
Candidate	Party	Votes	%
Luis Abad	Liberal Party		
Marilou Cayco	Partido Federal ng Pilipinas		
Edward de Sagon	Independent		
John Gato	Nationalist People's Coalition		
Total			
Registered voters/turnout		13,655	–

=== By municipality ===
Municipality	Abad		Cayco		de Sagon		Gato		Total votes
Municipality	Votes	%	Votes	%	Votes	%	Votes	%	Total votes
Basco									
Itbayat									
Ivana									
Mahatao									
Sabtang									
Uyugan									
Total									

== 2025 election result ==
2025 Philippine House of Representatives election in Batanes's at-large congressional district
Candidate	Party	Votes	%
Jun Gato (incumbent)	Nationalist People's Coalition	7,380	66.10
Marilou Cayco	Partido Federal ng Pilipinas	3,785	33.90
Total		11,165	100.00
Valid votes		11,165	97.19
Invalid/blank votes		323	2.81
Total votes		11,488	100.00
Registered voters/turnout		13,655	84.13
Nationalist People's Coalition hold			
Source: Commission on Elections
