= Vicente Barsana =

Filipino politician and member of Philippine Assembly from 1911 to 1916

The Honorable Vicente Barsana
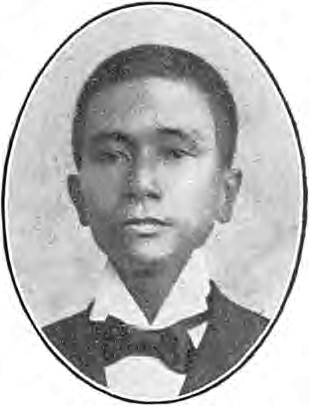
- Portrait as member of the Philippine Assembly, c. 1913

Governor of Batanes
- In office September 18, 1916 – January 22, 1917
- Preceded by: Ignacio Susara
- Succeeded by: Jose O. Ocampo

Member of the Philippine Assembly from Batanes lone district
- In office September 5, 1911 – October 16, 1916
- Preceded by: Teófilo Castillejos
- Succeeded by: Juan C. Castillejos

Personal details
- Born: Vicente Barsana y Callaray; February 5, 1865 Ivana, Batanes, Captaincy General of the Philippines
- Died: January 22, 1917 (aged 51)
- Party: Progresista

Vicente Barsana y Callaray (February 5, 1865 – January 22, 1917) was a Filipino elementary schoolteacher and politician of Ivatan ethnicity who represented Batanes's lone district in the Philippine Assembly from 1911 to 1912 and reelected from 1912 to 1916. He was also governor of Batanes from 1916 to 1917. In 1917, he, along with other Batanes provincial officials, died in a sea accident which ended his term as governor.

== Biography ==
Barsana was born on February 5, 1865 in Ivana, Batanes to Narciso Barsana and Jovita Callaray. He was a native Ivatan and a member of the principalia group in Batanes. A primary school teacher by profession, he was the head of the Uyugan public school from 1888 to 1890 and held various roles in Batanes's provincial government as well as the province's Court of First Instance. In 1904, he became Municipal President in Batanes and was Justice of the Peace from 1906 to 1909. After Teófilo Castillejos's death, he was elected to the Second Legislature in 1911 due to a special election and later won a seat in the Third Legislature in 1912. The Americans did appoint two Ivatan governors of Batanes, with Barsana being one. In 1916, he was appointed as the Governor of Batanes. However his term as governor was short-lived, having to serve until 1917 due to his death in a sea accident along with other provincial officials.

Barsana was a member of the Progresista Party. During his political career, he was a rival of the Castillejos clan in Batanes. During the 1912 Philippine Assembly elections, for instance, he defeated Juan C. Castillejos with a majority vote of 236 votes while Castillejos only received 118 votes. In 1916, Castillejos succeeded Barsana as house representative of Batanes while Barsana took power as governor.
