= List of Arellano University people =

This is a list of notable students, professors, alumni and honorary degree recipients of Arellano University. The following Arellanites were distinguished in various fields including public service, religion, literary arts, commerce, and medicine. The list includes people who have studied at various levels in the university, from elementary up to postgraduate school.

== Alumni ==
=== Arts and humanities ===
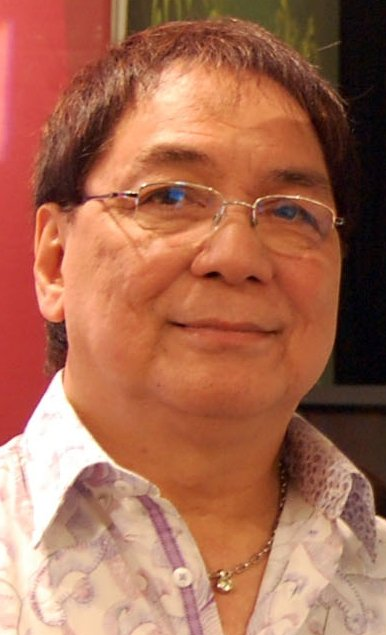
Joey de Leon

Gardo Versoza	Filipino actor
Bayani Agbayani	Filipino actor and comedian
Charee Pineda	Filipino actress and politician
Joey de Leon	Broadcast journalist, comedian, actor, and television presenter
Ted Failon	Broadcast journalist and former Congressman
Aljo Bendijo	Broadcast journalist
Yasmien Kurdi	Actress, Magna Cum laude
Sunshine Cruz	Filipino Actress
Valerie Concepcion	Actress, Magna Cum Laude
Kevin Santos	Actor, Cum laude
Mike Tan	Actor, dancer, model

=== Law and politics ===
Isko Moreno	Mayor of Manila
Higino A. Acala Sr.	Lawyer and civil servant
Timmy Chipeco	Politician
Rodolfo Biazon	Senator
Samira Gutoc-Tomawis	Politician
Richard Gomez	Actor, Congressman of the 4th District of Leyte
Jhong Hilario	Actor, Councilor of the First District of Makati
Marilou Cayco	Governor of Batanes

=== Athletics ===
Alvin Teng	Filipino basketball player
Jio Jalalon	Filipino basketball player

1. People who attended Arellano, but did not graduate or have yet to graduate.
