= Philippine House Special Committee on the North Luzon Growth Quadrangle =

Special committee of the House of Representatives of the Philippines

Special Committee on the North Luzon Growth Quadrangle
- 20th Congress

History
- New session started: To convene on July 28, 2025

Leadership
- Chairman: Vacant
- Minority Leader: Vacant

Website
- Special Committee on the North Luzon Growth Quadrangle

The Philippine House Special Committee on the North Luzon Growth Quadrangle is a special committee of the Philippine House of Representatives.

== Jurisdiction ==
As prescribed by House Rules, the committee's jurisdiction is on the policies and programs concerning the development of municipalities, cities, provinces and other local communities in the northwest Luzon area; and other actions to promote growth and expand avenues of economic cooperation with contiguous areas.

== Members, 20th Congress ==
As of June 30, 2025, all committee membership positions are vacant until the House convenes for its first regular session on July 28.

== Historical membership rosters ==
=== 18th Congress ===
Position	Members	Party	Province/City	District
Chairperson	Ramon Guico III	Lakas	Pangasinan	5th
Vice Chairpersons	Joseph Lara	PDP–Laban	Cagayan	3rd
Vice Chairpersons	Joseph Sto. Niño Bernos	Nacionalista	Abra	Lone
Members for the Majority	Sandra Eriguel	NUP	La Union	2nd
Members for the Majority	Jumel Anthony Espino	PDP–Laban	Pangasinan	2nd
Members for the Majority	Ramon Nolasco Jr.	NUP	Cagayan	1st
Members for the Majority	Ed Christopher Go	Nacionalista	Isabela	2nd
Members for the Majority	Mark Go	Nacionalista	Baguio	Lone
Members for the Majority	Allen Jesse Mangaoang	Nacionalista	Kalinga	Lone
Members for the Majority	Eugenio Angelo Barba	Nacionalista	Ilocos Norte	2nd
Members for the Majority	Arnold Celeste	Nacionalista	Pangasinan	1st
Members for the Majority	Ciriaco Gato Jr.	NPC	Batanes	Lone
Members for the Majority	Kristine Singson-Meehan	Bileg Ti Ilokano	Ilocos Sur	2nd
Members for the Majority	Ian Paul Dy	NPC	Isabela	3rd
Members for the Majority	Faustino Michael Carlos Dy III	PFP	Isabela	5th
Members for the Majority	Antonio Albano	NUP	Isabela	1st
Members for the Majority	Faustino Michael Dy V	NUP	Isabela	6th
Members for the Majority	Alyssa Sheena Tan	PFP	Isabela	4th
Members for the Minority	Jose Christopher Belmonte	Liberal	Quezon City	6th
Members for the Minority	Jose Singson Jr.	Probinsyano Ako	Party-list	

== See also ==
- House of Representatives of the Philippines
- List of Philippine House of Representatives committees
