= Batanes Provincial Board =

Legislative body of the province of Batanes, Philippines

Batanes Provincial Board Sangguniang Panlalawigan ng Batanes

Type
- Type: Unicameral
- Term limits: 3 terms (9 years)

Leadership
- Presiding Officer: Jonathan Enrique V. Nanud Jr., PFP since June 30, 2025

Structure
- Seats: 12 board members 1 ex officio presiding officer
- Political groups: Liberal (4) PFP (3) NPC (1) Independent (1) Nonpartisan (2) Vacancy (1)
- Length of term: 3 years
- Authority: Local Government Code of the Philippines

Elections
- Voting system: Plurality-at-large (regular members); Indirect election (ex officio members); Acclamation (sectoral member)
- Last election: May 12, 2025
- Next election: May 8, 2028

Meeting place
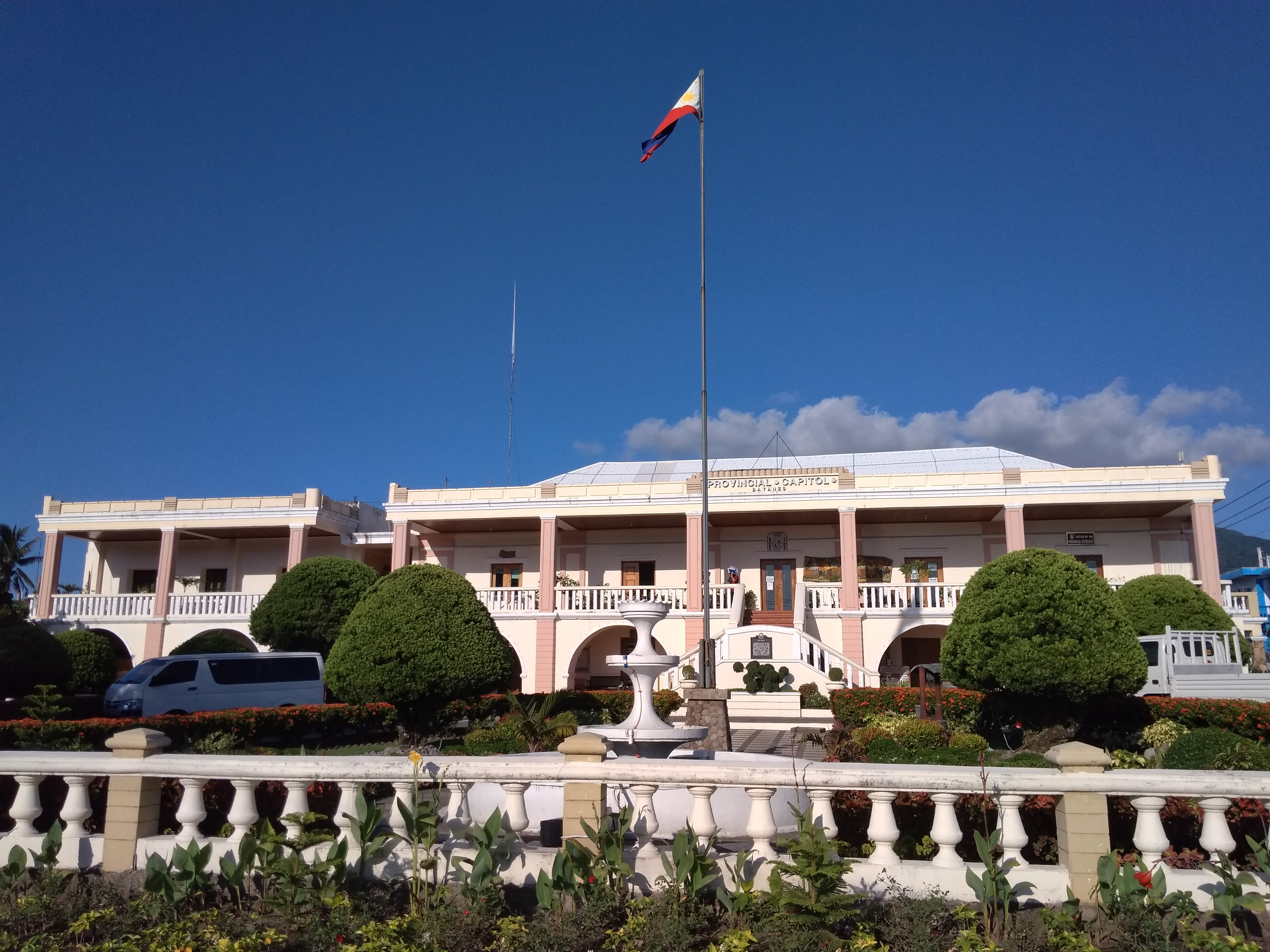
- Batanes Provincial Capitol, Basco

The Batanes Provincial Board is the Sangguniang Panlalawigan (provincial legislature) of the Philippine province of Batanes.

Most of its members are elected via plurality-at-large voting: the province is divided into two districts, with the first having five seats and the second having three seats. A voter votes up to five names in the first district and up to three names in the second district; the top candidates are then elected to fill the seats assigned to each district. The vice governor is the ex officio presiding officer, and only votes to break ties. The vice governor is elected via the plurality voting system province-wide.

Aside from the regular members, the board also includes the provincial federation presidents of the Liga ng mga Barangay (ABC, from its old name "Association of Barangay Captains"), the Sangguniang Kabataan (SK, youth councils) and the Philippine Councilors League (PCL) as ex officio members. They join the board once they are elected as president of their respective league or federation shortly after the start of their terms following the regular local elections (in the case of PCL) or the barangay and SK elections (in the case of ABC and SK).

In addition, the province's indigenous peoples community sends to the board a sectoral member, the Indigenous Peoples Mandatory Representative (IPMR), in accordance with national guidelines set by the National Commission on Indigenous Peoples pursuant to Republic Act No. 8371, as well as with local guidelines agreed upon by the IP community.

== District apportionment ==
The districts used in the appropriation of members is not coextensive with the Batanes's at-large congressional district. Unlike congressional representation which is at-large, Batanes is divided into two districts for representation in the Sangguniang Panlalawigan, with the capital Basco and neighboring Mahatao constituting the first district, and the rest of the towns (Itbayat, Ivana, Sabtang, and Uyugan) forming the second district.

In 2025, the first district gained two additional seats after the Department of Finance upgraded the province's income classification to 4th class, from 5th class.

Elections	No. of seats per district		Ex officio seats	Reserved seats	Total seats
Elections	1st	2nd	Ex officio seats	Reserved seats	Total seats
2004–2025	3	3	3	1	10
2025–present	5	3	3	1	12

== List of members ==
=== Current members ===
These are the members after the 2023 barangay and SK elections and the 2025 local elections.

The names of regular members are listed in order of their rank in the local election in their respective district.

- Vice Governor: Jonathan Enrique V. Nanud Jr. (PFP) – Presiding Officer

Seat	Board member	Party	Term number	Start of term	End of term
1st district	Roel Nicolas	Liberal	2	June 30, 2022	June 30, 2028
1st district	Anastacia Viola	Liberal	2	June 30, 2022	June 30, 2028
1st district	Josephine Castillo	PFP	1	June 30, 2025	June 30, 2028
1st district	Benny Fajardo	Liberal	1	June 30, 2025	June 30, 2028
1st district	John Dave Ablat	PFP	1	June 30, 2025	June 30, 2028
2nd district	Leonardo Hostallero	PFP	1	June 30, 2025	June 30, 2028
2nd district	Cleo Gonzales	Independent	1	June 30, 2025	June 30, 2028
2nd district	Francis Byron Peralta	NPC	2	June 30, 2022	June 30, 2028
ABC	Bernardo Mernelo	Nonpartisan	1	January 13, 2024	January 1, 2026
PCL	Francisco Castillo (Note: Serving in a holdover capacity (due to his reelection as councilor) until the election of a new set of officers of the province's Philippine Councilors League.)	Liberal	1	September 9, 2022	June 30, 2028
SK	Vacant (Note: Vacated by John Dave Ablat upon election as regular member of the Sangguniang Panlalawigan.)	Nonpartisan	–		January 1, 2026
IPMR	Vicenta Hidalgo	Nonpartisan	1		

=== Past members ===
==== Vice Governor ====
Election year	Name	Party
1992	Edmundo Puño	Liberal/PDP–Laban
1995	Elena Alcantara	Lakas–NUCD
1998	Constante Castillejos	LAMMP
2001	Constante Castillejos	Liberal
2004	Constante Castillejos	Liberal
2007	William Agsunod	Lakas
2010	Ferdinand Elica	Lakas–Kampi
2013	Ronald Aguto	Independent
2016	Ronald Aguto	UNA
2019	Ignacio Villa	Liberal
2022	Ignacio Villa	Liberal
2025	Jonathan Enriquez V. Nanud Jr.	PFP

==== 1st District ====
- Municipalities: Basco, Mahatao
- Population (2020): 11,220

Election year	Member (party)	Member (party)	Member (party)
1992	Severino Hernandez (LDP)	Agustin Raterta (Liberal)	Catalina Joves (LDP)
1995	Alexander Argonza (Lakas–NUCD)	Valerio Tabut (Liberal)	Catalina Joves (Lakas–NUCD)
1998	Alexander Argonza (Lakas–NUCD)	Manuel Viola (Liberal)	Tomas Estamo, Jr. (Liberal)
2001	Alexander Argonza (Lakas–NUCD)	Amada Fabi (Liberal)	Efren Lizardo (Lakas–NUCD)
2004	Ferdinand Elica (Liberal)	Amada Fabi (Liberal)	Orlando Hontomin (Liberal)
2007	Ferdinand Elica (Lakas)	Alexander Argonza (Lakas)	Albert Calagui (Lakas)
2010	Flinton Abad (Liberal)	Alexander Argonza (Lakas)	Florante Castillo (Liberal)
2013	Efren Lizardo (Independent)	Alexander Argonza (Independent)	Florante Castillo (Liberal)
2016	Evelyn Maduro (Liberal)	Edmundo Puño (NPC)	Juan Redondo (UNA)
2019	Evelyn Maduro (Liberal)	Ferdinand Elica (NPC)	Juan Redondo (NPC)
2022	Roel Nicolas (Liberal)	Anastacia Viola (Liberal)	Juan Redondo (NPC)

==== 2nd District ====
- Municipalities: Itbayat, Ivana, Sabtang, Uyugan
- Population (2020): 7,611

Election year	Member (party)	Member (party)	Member (party)
1992	Redencion Castaño (Independent/LDP)	Augustus Cataluña (LP/PDP)	Nestor Capito (LP/PDP)
1995	Rosario Batin (Liberal)	Augustus Cataluña (Liberal)	Charles Ibañes I (Lakas–NUCD)
1998	Victorio Balbao (Liberal)	Migdonio Faberes (Liberal)	Charles Ibañes I (Liberal)
2001	Milagros Juliet Abas (Lakas–NUCD)	Ronald Aguto (Liberal)	Charles Ibañes I (Liberal)
2004	Milagros Juliet Abas (Liberal)	Romulo Cielo (Liberal)	Ignacio Villa (Liberal)
2007	Milagros Juliet Abas (Lakas)	Rogelio Delapa (Lakas)	Ignacio Villa (Liberal)
2010	Ramoncito Imperial (Liberal)	Rogelio Delapa (Nacionalista)	Ignacio Villa (Nacionalista)
2013	Milagros Juliet Abas (Independent)	Rogelio Delapa (Liberal)	Juliet Cataluña (Liberal)
2016	Milagros Juliet Abas (UNA)	Maxilindo Emilio Babalo (Liberal)	Ignacio Villa (Liberal)
2019	Milagros Juliet Abas (NPC)	Romeo Acebes (Liberal)	Juliet Cataluña (Liberal)
2022	Francis Byron Peralta (Lakas)	Wilfredo Cabitac (PDR)	Juliet Cataluña (Liberal)

==== Liga ng mga Barangay member ====
Election year	ABC/LB President	Barangay Captain of
2018	Benigno Cobico	Bgy. Kayhuvokan, Basco

==== Philippine Councilors League member ====
Election year	PCL President	Councilor in
2019	Will Lee Gabotero (Liberal)	Basco
2022	Francisco Castillo (Liberal)	Basco

==== Sangguniang Kabataan member ====
Election year	SK President	SK Chairperson of
2018	Argel Hortiz	Bgy. Kayuganan (Pob.), Uyugan
2023	John Dave Ablat*	Bgy. Uyoy, Mahatao

* Left office on June 30, 2025 upon his assumption as elected regular member of the Sangguniang Panlalawigan.

==== Indigenous Peoples Mandatory Representative ====
Year	IP Representative
	Vicenta Hidalgo
