= Victor de Padua =

Filipino politician (1898–1952)

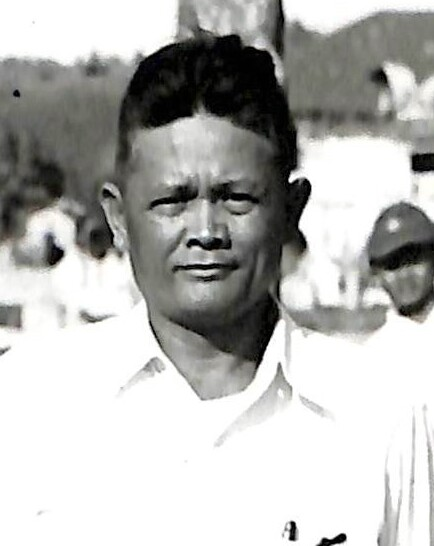
De Padua in 1945

Victor de Padua (1898–1952) was the Provincial Governor of the province of Batanes during the Japanese occupation of the Philippines from June 1944 and February 1945. A member of the Ilocano people, he had previously been a school superintendent.

Originally named Victor Padua, he went to Batanes after high school to work as an English teacher due to a family dispute. He eventually settled in the island, changing his name to Victor de Padua. He was sent to the Philippine Normal School as a pensionado, (Note: An American-educated student.) and - upon his return to Batanes - became Head Teacher. He was eventually designated as the first Division Superintendent of Schools for Batanes.

During World War II the Japanese executed the erstwhile governor Juan Agudo, and the Provincial Board of Batanes bade him serve as interim governor for Batanes. His term lasted between June 1, 1944, and February 28, 1945. Juan Agudo had served as governor of Batanes from December 30, 1940 until August 31, 1942. Following his execution, Batanes was re-annexed to Cagayan Province under Japanese military administration from July 1942 until June 1944, before being reconstituted as a separate province with De Padua as its appointed governor. During the occupation, local resistance movements known as the Batanes Bisumi Fighters were established in January 1944 as a branch of the Hunters-ROTC, named after the six towns of the province: Basco, Ivana, Sabtang, Uyugan, Mahatao, and Itbayat. The guerrillas captured the Japanese garrison in Sabtang on April 25, 1945, before being overwhelmed by a larger Japanese force on May 17, 1945.

He relinquished the position to resume his original appointment as Division Superintendent for Schools. He reopened the public school system. He died in 1952 at the age of 54. He was married to Rosario Baroña; they had six children, four of which graduated from University of the Philippines Manila, College of Medicine as MDs, and 2 became civil engineers, one from the Mapua Institute of Technology in Manila and one from University of the Philippines Diliman, College of Engineering.

His descendants now live in the United States, Australia, Manila and Los Baños, Laguna in the Philippines.
