= Ronald Aguto =

Filipino politician (born 1972)

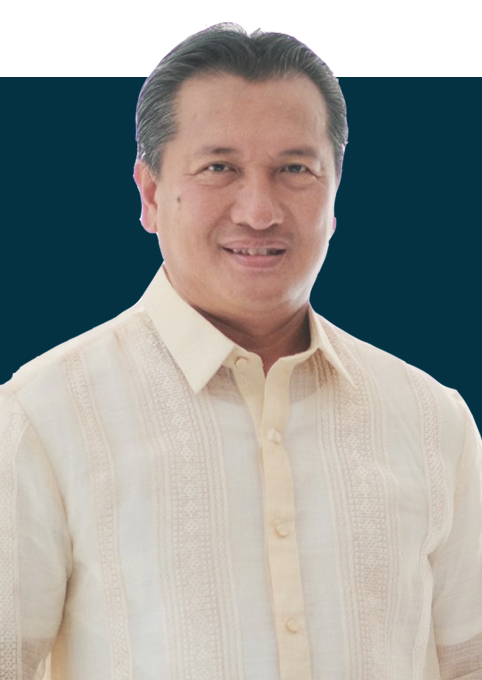

Governor of Batanes
- Incumbent
- Assumed office June 30, 2025
- Vice Governor: Jonathan Enrique Nanud Jr.
- Preceded by: Marilou Cayco

Personal details
- Born: Ronaldo Poncio Aguto Jr. October 17, 1972 (age 53) Ivana, Batanes Philippines
- Party: PFP (2024–present)
- Other political affiliations: Reporma (2021–2024)
- Occupation: Politician, former law enforcement agent

Ronald "Jun" Poncio Aguto Jr. is a Filipino politician who is the governor of Batanes since 2025.

== Early life and education ==
Ronald Poncio Aguto Jr. was born on October 19, 1972. He is part of Batch 36 of Class 1999 of the National Bureau of Investigation (NBI) Academy. Aguto also attended various international trainings including at the FBI National Academy in the United States.

== National Bureau of Investigation ==
Aguto was part of the National Bureau of Investigation (NBI). He was chief of the NBI's Cybercrime Division.

== Political career ==
Aguto ran in the 2022 elections for the position of House of Representatives member for Batanes lone district. He ran on a platform of health, opportunities and livelihood, peace and order, and education but lost to Jun Gato. He ran under Partido Reporma.

Aguto took part at the 2025 local elections and got elected as governor of Batanes under the Partido Federal ng Pilipinas, the party of incumbent president Bongbong Marcos. He won by 209 votes outbesting Medardo Abad Jr.

== Personal life ==
He is married to Hazel Aguto.
