= Jun Gato =

Filipino physician and politician (1959–2026)

Ciriaco Gato
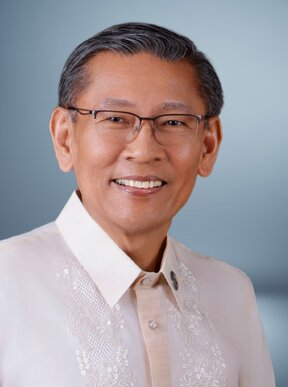
- Official portrait, 2026

Member of the Philippine House of Representatives for Batanes's at-large district
- In office June 30, 2019 – September 21, 2026
- Preceded by: Henedina Abad

Personal details
- Born: Ciriaco Bayaras Gato Jr. November 16, 1959 Sabtang, Batanes, Philippines
- Died: September 21, 2026 (aged 66) Manila, Philippines
- Party: NPC
- Spouse: Jade Bañez
- Children: 2
- Education: University of the East (BS); University of the Philippines Manila (MD)
- Occupation: Politician
- Profession: Physician

Ciriaco "Jun" Bayaras Gato Jr. (November 16, 1959 – September 21, 2026) was a Filipino physician and politician who served as the representative for Batanes's at-large congressional district for the Philippine House of Representatives from 2019 until his death in 2026. He was a member of the Nationalist People's Coalition.

== Early life and career ==
Gato was born in Sabtang, Batanes, on November 16, 1959, to Ciriaco Gato Sr., a retired government employee from Itbayat, and Felisa Elcano, a retired teacher from Basco. His family had politicians: Simon Gato, his father's cousin, and Vicente Gato, his second cousin, both governors of Batanes. He was raised in Itbayat, where he completed his elementary and high school. He gained a Bachelor of Science degree from the University of the East before graduating as a Doctor of Medicine at the University of the Philippines College of Medicine in 1984. Prior to his political career, he was an ear, nose, and throat specialist for 30 years, partaking in medical missions by himself or with a group in Basco.

== Political career ==
=== Elections ===
Gato decided to run for office due to patients being airlifted to Manila or Tuguegarao due to the lack of medical supplies in Batanes, a scarce supply of water, food shortages, transport issues, and garbage and sewage problems, seeking to fix these issues. He ran for the lone congressional district of Batanes under the Nationalist People's Coalition (NPC). Gato, with 3,367 votes, narrowly beat former Representative and Budget Secretary Butch Abad of the Liberal Party (LP) and Carlo Diasnes of the National Unity Party with 3,129 and 3,032 votes, respectively, winning the election. He described his win as a "gift from God" and a surprise with his "low-key campaign", further stating that "Hard work always pays off, and when you have this genuine intention to serve and help the people, you can make it."

Gato ran for a second term in the 2022 elections under the NPC. He won with 3,872 votes (33.92% of the votes), beating Luis Abad of LP, Ronald Aguto Jr. of Partido para sa Demokratikong Reporma, and Diasnes of Lakas-CMD, with 3,037 (26.61%), 2,484 (21.76%), and 2,022 (17.71%) votes respectively. He ran for a third term in the 2025 elections, also under the NPC. He won with 7,380 votes, beating his sole opponent, Malou Cayco of Partido Federal ng Pilipinas, who gained 3,785 votes.

=== Positions and laws ===
Gato served as the chairperson of the Philippine House Committee on Health and vice chairperson of the Special Committee on the North Luzon Growth Quadrangle. He also served as a member of the committees of Civil Service and Professional Regulation, Disaster Resilience, and Higher and Technical Education. He helped author the Virology and Vaccine Institute of the Philippines Act or Republic Act No. 12290 that established a national research center set on virus, pathogens, and vaccine development studies and Republic Act No. 11472 which added 350 beds to the CARAGA Regional Hospital in Surigao City. He opposed territorial claims made in China over Batanes and supported bills that allowed the use of medical cannabis for some ailments.

== Personal life and death ==
Gato was married to Jade Bañez and they had two children: Dr. Patricia Gato Suzaro and Atty. Georgina Mia Gato.

He died from a heart attack in Manila while being taken to a hospital on September 21, 2026, at the age of 66. His wake was held in Quezon City from September 22 to 26, followed by a necrological service on September 25, and interment at the Everest Hills Memorial Park in Muntinlupa on September 27.

On September 23, House Resolution No. 1470 by Speaker Bojie Dy, Majority Leader Sandro Marcos, and Minority Leader Marcelino Libanan honored Gato and his life, profession, and public service to the Ivatans. Commission on Elections Chairman George Garcia said that a special election would be held on November 28 to fill the vacant Batanes congressional seat. Among the candidates is Gato's brother John.

== Electoral history ==
Electoral history of Jun Gato
Year	Office	Party	Votes received				Result
Year	Office	Party	Total	%	P.	Swing	Result
2019	Representative (Batanes)	NPC	3,367	35.34%	1st	—N/a	Won
2022	Representative (Batanes)	NPC	3,872	33.92%	1st	−1.42	Won
2025	Representative (Batanes)	NPC	7,380	66.10%	1st	+32.18	Won
