= Marilou Cayco =

Filipino politician (born 1960)

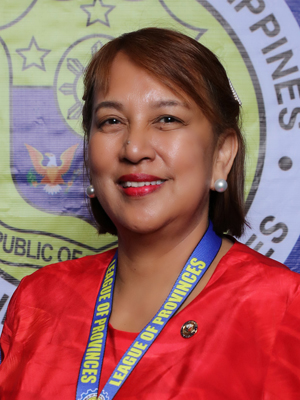

40th Governor of Batanes
- In office June 30, 2016 – June 30, 2025
- Vice Governor: Ronald Aguto (2016–2019); Ignacio Villa (2019–2025)
- Preceded by: Vicente Gato
- Succeeded by: Ronald Aguto

Personal details
- Born: November 22, 1960 (age 65) Itbayat, Batanes, Philippines
- Party: PFP (2023–present)
- Other political affiliations: Liberal (2012–2023)
- Education: Arellano University

Marilou Horlina Cayco (born November 22, 1960) is a Filipino politician who served as Governor of Batanes. She first won election to Governor in 2016 and was re-elected in 2019. She ran in the 2025 Philippine House of Representatives elections as a candidate of the Partido Federal ng Pilipinas for the Lone district of Batanes but lost to the incumbent, Jun Gato.

== Electoral history ==
Electoral history of Marilou Cayco
Year	Office	Party	Votes received				Result
Year	Office	Party	Total	%	P.	Swing	Result
2013	Governor of Batanes	Liberal	2,389	27.40%	2nd	—N/a	Lost
2016	Governor of Batanes	Liberal	3,418	37.38%	1st	+9.98	Won
2019	Governor of Batanes	Liberal	5,753	61.86%	1st	+24.48	Won
2022	Governor of Batanes	Liberal	6,489	61.04%	1st	-0.82	Won
2025	Representative (Batanes)	PFP	3,785	33.90%	2nd	—N/a	Lost
2026	Representative (Batanes)	PFP	TBA				

Political offices
Preceded by Vicente Gato	Governor of Batanes; 2016–present	Incumbent
