= Legislative districts of Batanes =

Legislative district of the Philippines

The legislative districts of Batanes are the representations of the province of Batanes in the various national legislatures of the Philippines. The province is currently represented in the lower house of the Congress of the Philippines through its lone congressional district.

== History ==
Batanes initially had two representatives, one elected and one appointed, to the Malolos Congress in 1898; this remained so until 1899. It was later annexed to Cagayan as a sub-province, by virtue of Philippine Commission Act No. 209 on August 22, 1901, and was represented as part of the first district of Cagayan in the 1st Philippine Legislature starting in 1907. Upon its re-establishment as a regular province on May 20, 1909, by virtue of Act No. 1952, Batanes was granted separate representation, and elected one representative later that year.

When seats for the upper house of the Philippine Legislature were elected from territory-based districts between 1916 and 1935, the province formed part of the first senatorial district which elected two out of the 24-member senate.

During the Japanese occupation of the Philippines, the province was re-annexed to Cagayan and represented as part of that province in the National Assembly of the Second Philippine Republic. Upon the restoration of the Philippine Commonwealth in 1945, the province's continued to comprise a lone district.

The province was represented in the Interim Batasang Pambansa as part of Region II from 1978 to 1984, and elected one representative to the Regular Batasang Pambansa in 1984.

Batanes retained its lone congressional district under the new Constitution which was proclaimed on February 11, 1987, and elected its member to the restored House of Representatives starting that same year.

== Current districts ==
Legislative Districts and Congressional Representatives of Batanes
District	Current Representative	Party	Constituent LGUs	Population (2020)	Area
Lone	Ciriaco Gato Jr. (since 2019); Basco	NPC	List: Basco; Itbayat; Ivana; Mahatao; Sabtang; Uyugan	18,831	219.01 km^{2}

== See also ==
- Legislative districts of Cagayan
