= Governor of Batanes =

Local chief executive

- Gobernador ng Lalawigan ng Batanes
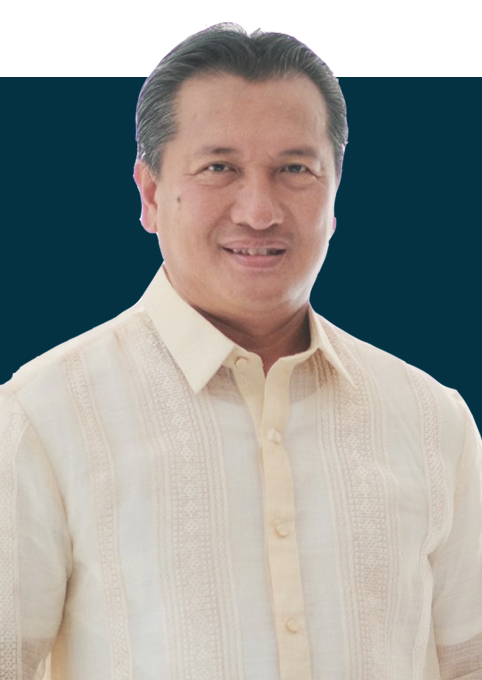
- Incumbent; Ronald Aguto since June 30, 2025
- Style: The Honorable
- Seat: Batanes Provincial Capitol, Basco
- Term length: 3 years, renewable maximum not eligible for re-election immediately after three consecutive terms
- Inaugural holder: José Huelva y Melgarejo
- Formation: June 26, 1783
- Deputy: Vice Governor

The governor of Batanes is the local chief executive and head of the Provincial Government of Batanes in the Philippines. Along with the governors of Cagayan, Isabela, Nueva Vizcaya, the province's chief executive is a member of the Regional Development Council of the Cagayan Valley Region.

== List of governors of Batanes ==
Governors of Batanes

1. SPANISH PERIOD (1783–1898)
No.	Name	Term	Note(s)
1	José Huelva y Melgarejo	June 26, 1783 - 1785	first governor of Batanes (Provincia dela Concepcion).
2	Miguel del Amo	1785 – 1789	
3	Joaquin del Castillo	1789 – 1794	
4	Felimon Zenoreta	1794-1798	
5	Valerio Bermudez	1799-1831	Alcalde of Cagayan when Batanes was annexed to it.
6	Luis Lima	1831-1855	Alcalde of Cagayan
7	Fernando de la Cueva	1855-1872	Province of Batanes was restored.
8	Jose Serra	1872-1885	
9	Julián Fortea	1885-September 18, 1898	last Spanish governor. Died while in office.

2. FIRST PHILIPPINE REPUBLIC (1898–1899)
No.	Image	Name	Term	Note(s)
1		Teofilo Castillejos	September 20, 1898 - 1899	A katipunero. First elected Filipino Governor.

3. PHILIPPINE LEGISLATURE (1907–1937)
No.	Image	Name	Term	Note(s)
—	N/A		1899-1907	Batanes was again annexed to Cagayan
2		Otto Johns Scheerer	August 20, 1909 - November 29, 1909	From Hamburg. First appointed German born Governor. Founded the UP Institute of Linguistics.
3		Jose Jimenez	December 6, 1909 - September 12, 1910	
4		George M. Egan	September 17, 1910 - November 6, 1911	
5		Clifton M. Spears	November 13, 1911 - April 8, 1912	
6		George M. Egan	April 29, 1912 - July 21, 1913	On his second term.
7		Alexander Cordenker	July 28, 1913 - February 23, 1915	
8		Ignacio Susara	March 15, 1915 - January 24, 1916	Acting governor.
9		Jose O. Ocampo	January 31, 1916 - February 21, 1916	
10		Ignacio Susara	February 28, 1916 - September 11, 1916	On his second term.
11		Vicente Barsana	September 18, 1916 - January 22, 1917	Also elected first representative of Batanes
12		Jose O. Ocampo	January 29, 1917 - May 3, 1917	On his second term.
13		Lucas Gonzalo	May 15, 1917 - May 6, 1918	
14		Antonio F. Buenaventura	May 20, 1918 - June 10, 1918	Acting governor.
15		Lucas Gonzalo	June 17, 1918 - November 3, 1919	On his second term
16		Mariano A. Lizardo	November 11, 1919 - December 1, 1923	
17		Juan G. Castillejos	January 3, 1923 - September 30, 1925	Also elected congressman.
18		Claudio Castillejos	October 21, 1925 - October 10, 1928	
19		Bernardo Barsana	October 16, 1928 - October 12, 1931	
20		Jose Abad	October 19, 1931 - December 30, 1937	

4. COMMONWEALTH PERIOD (1938–1946)
No.	Image	Name	Term	Note(s)
21		Domingo Cacho	December 30, 1937 - December 30, 1940	Elected.
22		Juan Agudo	December 30, 1940 - August 31, 1942	
—	N/A		July 1, 1942 - June 1, 1944	Japanese time, Batanes was again annexed to Cagayan.
23		Victor de Padua	June 1, 1944 - February 28, 1945	appointed governor

5. THIRD PHILIPPINE REPUBLIC (1946–1978)
No.	Image	Name	Term	Note(s)
24		Mariano Bayares	March 6, 1946 - June 27, 1946	appointed governor
25		Eugenio Agudo	July 18, 1946 - December 30, 1951	
26		Ciriaco A. Abad	December 30, 1951 - December 30, 1955	
27		Marcos P. Malupa	December 30, 1955 - December 30, 1959	
28		Eugenio Agudo	December 30, 1959 - December 30, 1963	On his second term.
29		Silvino Artemio Barsana Agudo	December 30, 1968 – December 30, 1971	
30		Simon G. Gato	December 30, 1971 - June 30, 1978	

6. FOURTH PHILIPPINE REPUBLIC (1978–1986)
No.	Image	Name	Term	Note(s)
31		Jose A. Santana	June 30, 1978 – February 19, 1980	
32		Mario C. Lizardo	March 3, 1980 – June 18, 1986	

7. FIFTH PHILIPPINE REPUBLIC (1986–present)
No.	Image	Name	Term	Note(s)
33		Aurora Abad	June 18, 1986 - November 30, 1987	Appointed governor
34		Godofredo C. Fabi	December 1, 1987 - December 5, 1987	OIC governor
35		Tomas H. Batin	December 6, 1987 - February 1, 1988	OIC governor
36		Telesforo Castillejos	February 2, 1988 - June 30, 1998	Elected in 3 consecutive terms.
37		Vicente S. Gato	June 30, 1998 - June 30, 2007	Elected in 3 consecutive terms.
38		Telesforo Castillejos	June 30, 2007 - June 30, 2010	Elected.
39		Vicente S. Gato	June 30, 2010 - June 30, 2016	Elected in 2 consecutive terms.
40		Marilou Horlina Cayco	June 30, 2016 - June 30, 2025	Elected in 3 consecutive terms.
41		Ronald Aguto	June 30, 2025- present	

== Elections ==
- 1988 Batanes local elections
- 1992 Batanes local elections
- 1995 Batanes local elections
- 1998 Batanes local elections
- 2001 Batanes local elections
- 2004 Batanes local elections
- 2007 Batanes local elections
- 2010 Batanes local elections
- 2013 Batanes local elections
- 2016 Batanes local elections
- 2019 Batanes local elections
- 2022 Batanes local elections
- 2025 Batanes local elections
