= Ivana, Batanes =

Municipality in Batanes, Philippines

Ivana
- Municipality
- Municipality of Ivana
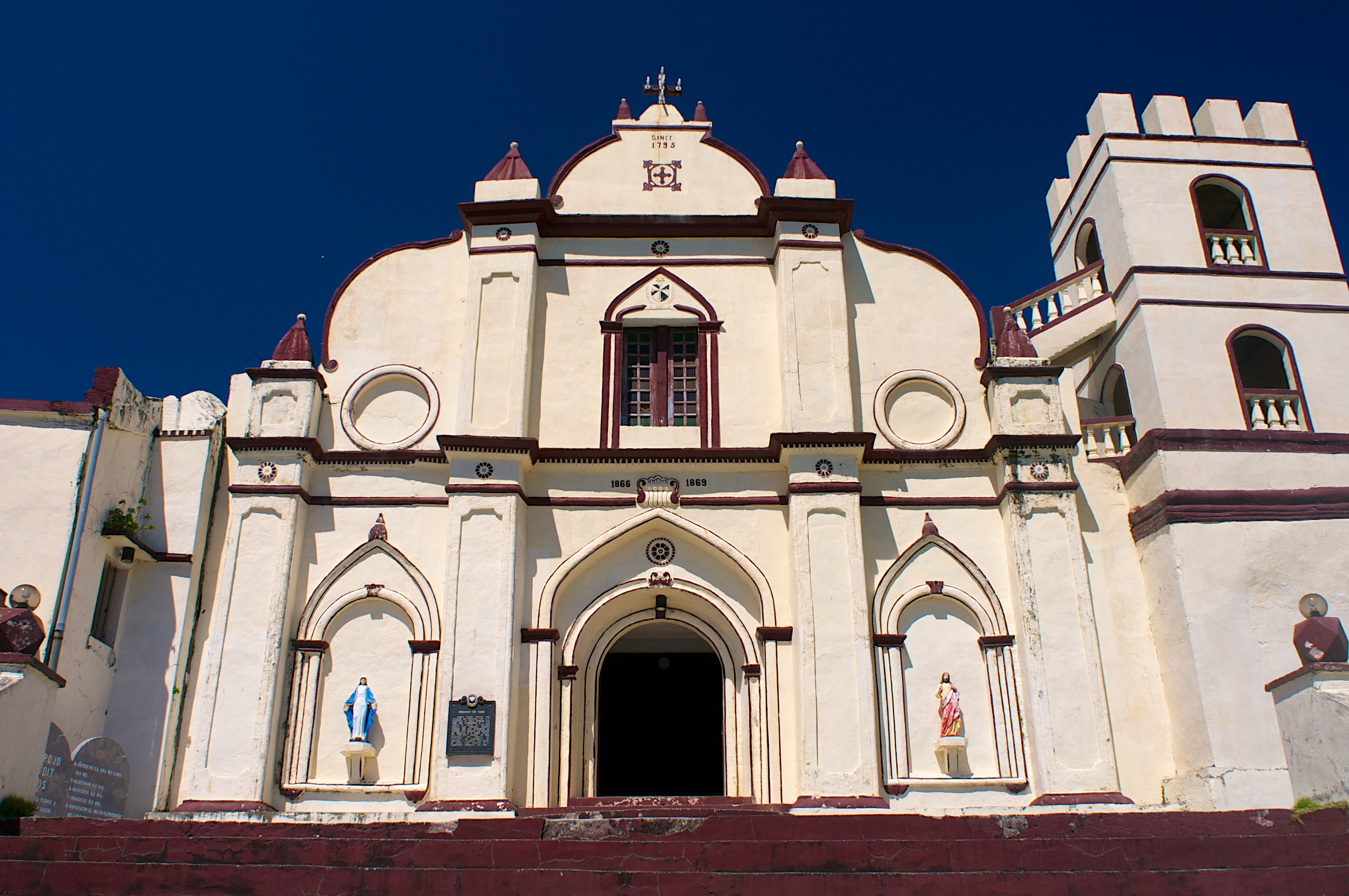
- Facade of San Jose de Ivana Church

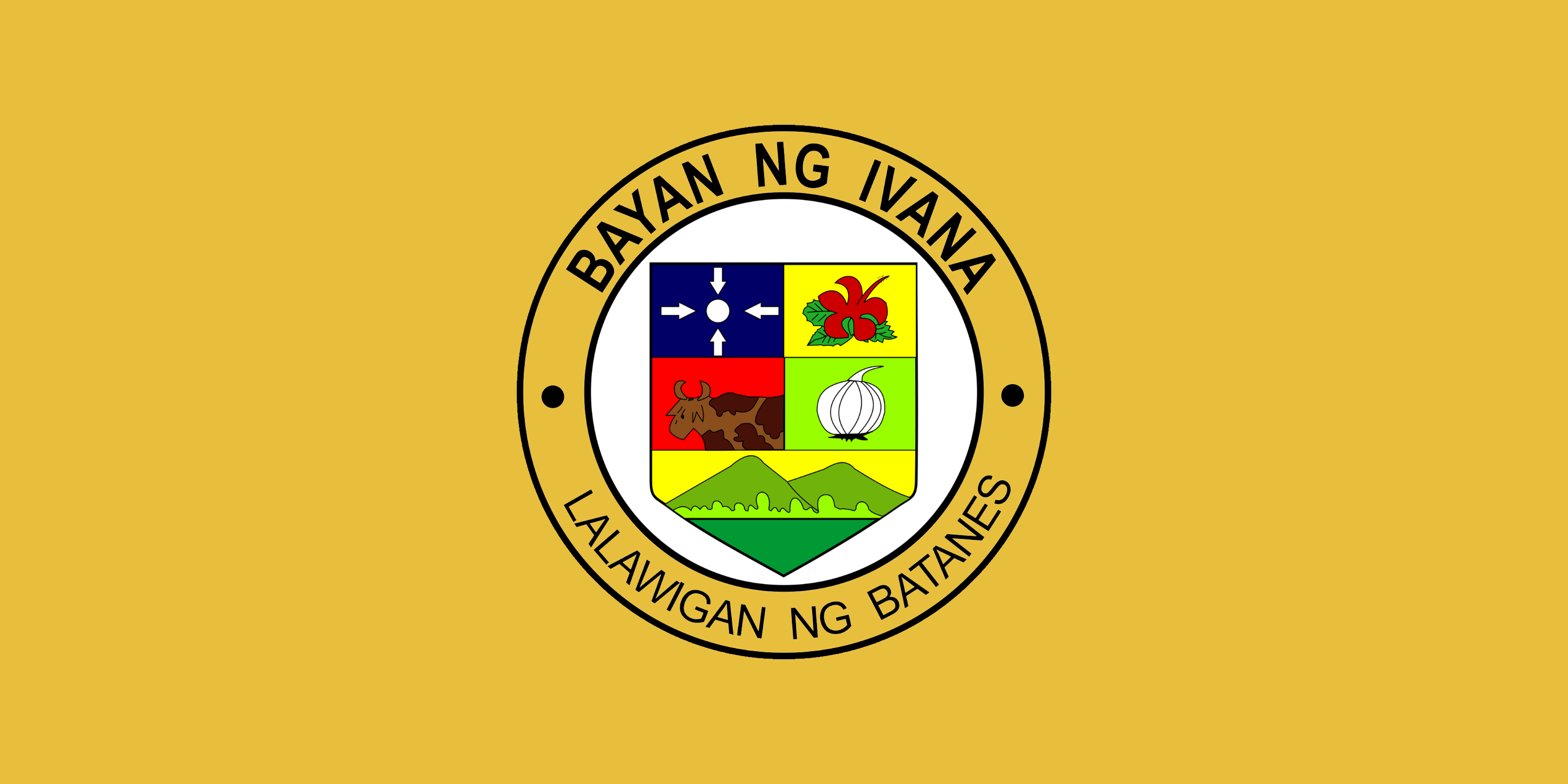
- Flag Seal

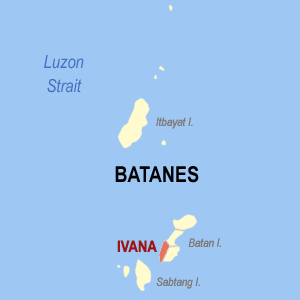
- Map of Batanes with Ivana highlighted
- Interactive map of Ivana
- Location within the Philippines Ivana (Luzon) Ivana (Batanes)
- Coordinates: 20°22′N 121°55′E
- Country: Philippines
- Region: Cagayan Valley
- Province: Batanes
- District: Lone district
- Barangays: 4 (see Barangays)

Government
  - Type: Sangguniang Bayan
  - Mayor: Jerry A. Agana
  - Vice Mayor: Henry Cabuco
  - Representative: Ciriaco B. Gato Jr.
  - Municipal Council: Members: Romeo Emilio Fidel; Christopher Cabugao; Chris Cataluña; Norman James Enego; Alberto Y. Viegan; Frederick Zenon E. Cataluña; Cresente Anthony Barsana; Boyet Hostallero
  - Electorate: 1,216 voters (2025)

Area
  - Total: 16.54 km^{2} (6.39 sq mi)
- Elevation: 9.9 m (32 ft)
- Highest elevation: 436 m (1,430 ft)
- Lowest elevation: 0 m (0 ft)

Population (2024 census)
  - Total: 1,368
  - Density: 82.71/km^{2} (214.2/sq mi)
  - Households: 413

Economy
  - Income class: 5th municipal income class
  - Poverty incidence: 2.66% (2023)
  - Revenue: ₱ 61.92 million (2024)
  - Assets: ₱ 121.7 million (2024)
  - Expenditure: ₱ 63.05 million (2024)
  - Liabilities: ₱ 23.69 million (2024)

Service provider
  - Electricity: Batanes Electric Cooperative (BATANELCO)
- Time zone: UTC+8 (PST)
- ZIP code: 3902
- PSGC: 0200903000
- IDD : area code: +63 (0)78
- Native languages: Ivatan; Tagalog; Ilocano
- Website: www.ivana-batanes.gov.ph

Ivana, officially the Municipality of Ivana, (Note: Ivatan: Kavahayan nu Ivana; Ilocano: Ili ti Ivana; Tagalog: Bayan ng Ivana) is a municipality in the province of Batanes, Philippines. According to the 2024 census, it has a population of 1,368 people, making it the least populated town in the province and second least populated in the country, behind Kalayaan, Palawan.

== History ==
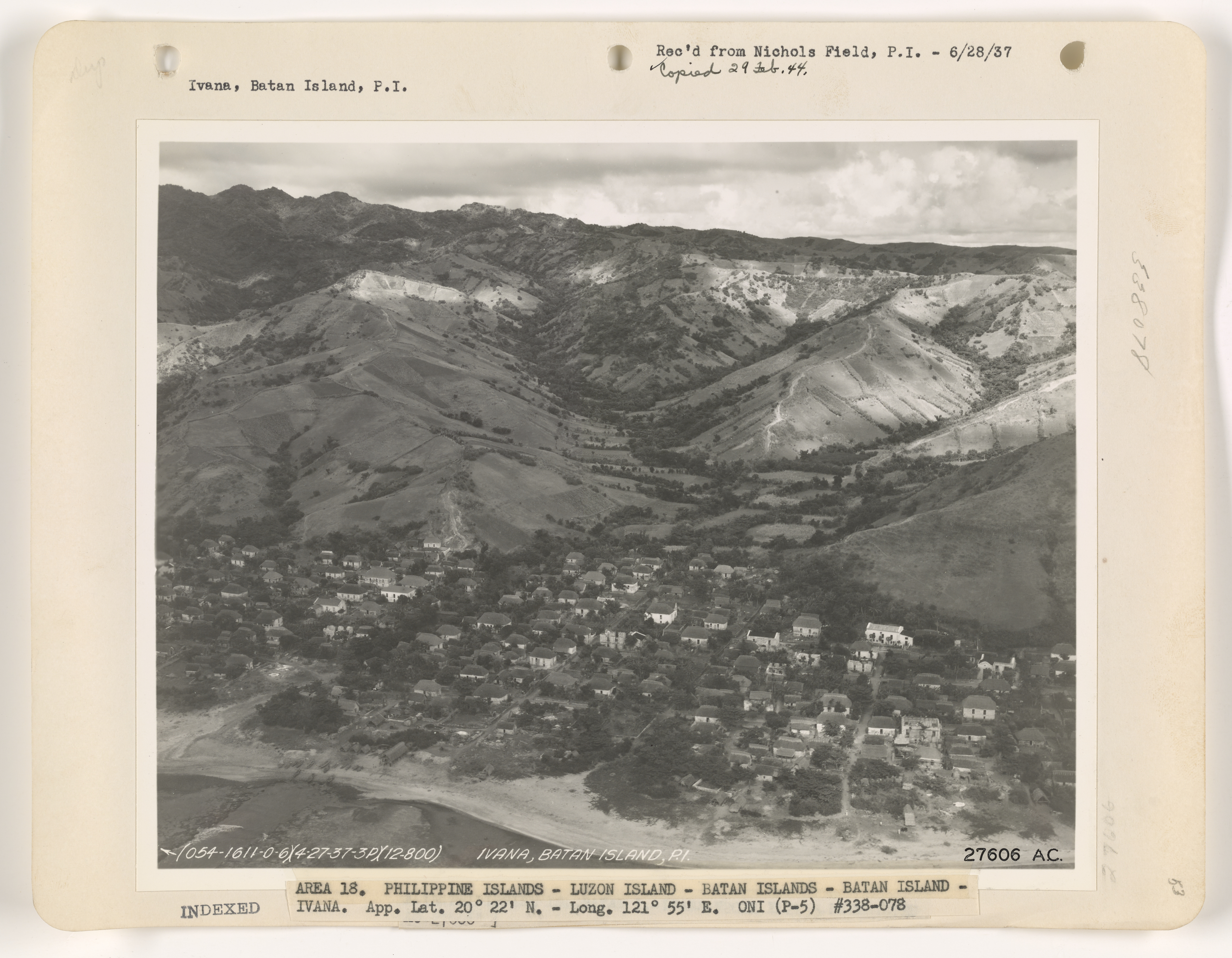
Aerial view of Ivana, 1937

Ivana is one of the three major pueblos of Batanes in the first half of the 19th century, alongside Basco and Marigatao. A mission was established in the area in the late 18th century, with evangelization being described as successful mainly due to the baptism of seven of the nine principals of Ivana.

In 1789, Joaquin del Castillo became the third governor of Batanes and tried to strengthen his authority in the province. An uprising ensued led by a certain Chivunao, who persuaded his chiefs to rebel against the government. This culminated in a battle in Itbud where the Spaniards' cannons forced the rebels to surrender.

== Geography ==
Ivana is located at 20°22′N 121°55′E.

According to the Philippine Statistics Authority, the municipality has a land area of 16.54 square kilometres (6.39 sq mi) constituting 7.55% of the 219.01-square-kilometre- (84.56 sq mi) total area of Batanes.

=== Barangays ===
Ivana is politically subdivided into 4 barangays. Each barangay consists of puroks and some have sitios.

San Vicente was elevated into a barrio in 1955.

PSGC	Barangay	Population			±% p.a.	
		2024		2010		
020903001	Radiwan	27.9%	381	368	▴	0.24%
020903002	Salagao	26.5%	363	319	▴	0.90%
020903003	San Vicente (Igang)	18.9%	258	230	▴	0.80%
020903004	Tuhel (Poblacion)	26.8%	366	332	▴	0.68%
	Total		1,368	1,249	▴	0.63%

=== Climate ===
Climate data for Ivana, Batanes
Month	Jan	Feb	Mar	Apr	May	Jun	Jul	Aug	Sep	Oct	Nov	Dec	Year
Mean daily maximum °C (°F)	23 (73)	23 (73)	24 (75)	26 (79)	28 (82)	29 (84)	29 (84)	29 (84)	28 (82)	27 (81)	26 (79)	24 (75)	26 (79)
Mean daily minimum °C (°F)	22 (72)	22 (72)	23 (73)	25 (77)	27 (81)	28 (82)	28 (82)	28 (82)	27 (81)	26 (79)	25 (77)	23 (73)	25 (78)
Average precipitation mm (inches)	44 (1.7)	35 (1.4)	29 (1.1)	48 (1.9)	204 (8.0)	238 (9.4)	291 (11.5)	325 (12.8)	304 (12.0)	202 (8.0)	141 (5.6)	60 (2.4)	1,921 (75.8)
Average rainy days	11.1	9.1	8.3	9.2	15.7	17.1	19.4	21.9	21.1	18.4	16.3	12.4	180
Source: Meteoblue

== Demographics ==
Population census of Ivana
Year	Pop.	±% p.a.
1903	1,856	—
1918	939	−4.44%
1939	965	+0.13%
1948	1,083	+1.29%
1960	1,039	−0.34%
1970	989	−0.49%
1975	942	−0.97%
1980	972	+0.63%
1990	1,190	+2.04%
1995	1,024	−2.78%
2000	1,293	+5.13%
2007	1,181	−1.24%
2010	1,249	+2.06%
2015	1,327	+1.16%
2020	1,407	+1.24%
2024	1,368	−0.67%
Source: Philippine Statistics Authority

In the 2024 census, Ivana had a population of 1,368. The population density was 83 inhabitants per square kilometre (210/sq mi).

== Economy ==
Poverty incidence of Ivana (%)

Source: Philippine Statistics Authority

== Government ==
=== Local government ===
Ivana is part of to the lone congressional district of the province of Batanes. It is governed by a mayor, designated as its local chief executive, and by a municipal council as its legislative body in accordance with the Local Government Code. The mayor, vice mayor, and the councilors are elected directly by the people through an election which is being held every three years.

=== Elected officials ===
Members of the Provincial and Municipal Council (2025–2028)
Position	Name
Congressman	Ciriaco B. Gato Jr.
Governor	Ronald P. Aguto Jr.
Vice Governor	Jonathan Enrique V. Nanud Jr.
Mayor	Jerry A. Agana
Vice-Mayor	Henry Cabuco
Councilors	Romeo Emilio Fidel
Councilors	Christopher Cabugao
Councilors	Chris Cataluña
Councilors	Norman James Enego
Councilors	Alberto Y. Viegan
Councilors	Frederick Zenon E. Cataluña
Councilors	Cresente Anthony Barsana
Councilors	Boyet Hostallero

== Education ==
The Schools Division of Batanes governs the town's public education system. The division office is a field office of the DepEd in Cagayan Valley region. The Ivana-Uyugan Schools District Office governs both public and private elementary and high schools throughout the municipality. This includes the municipality of Uyugan.

=== Primary and elementary schools ===
- Imnajbu Elementary School (located in Uyugan)
- Ivana Elementary School
- San Vicente Elementary School
- Uyugan Elementary School (located in Uyugan)

=== Secondary schools ===
- Ivana National High School
- Itbud Integrated School (located in Uyugan)

== Notable people ==
- Vicente Barsana, member of the Philippine Assembly from 1912 to 1916 and governor of Batanes from 1916 to 1917
