= Telesforo Castillejos =

Filipino politician

Governor of Batanes
- In office June 30, 2007 – June 30, 2010
- Vice Governor: William Agsunod
- Preceded by: Vicente Gato
- Succeeded by: Vicente Gato
- In office June 30, 1988 – June 30, 1998
- Vice Governor: Edmundo Puño (1988–1995); Elena Alcantara (1995–1998)
- Preceded by: Tomas Batin
- Succeeded by: Vicente Gato

Personal details
- Born: January 5, 1947 (age 79) Basco, Batanes, Philippines
- Party: Aksyon (2024–present)
- Other political affiliations: NPC (2015–2024); Lakas–CMD (until 2012); UNA (2012–2015)
- Spouse: Susan Castillejos
- Occupation: Civil Engineer

Telesforo Falces Castillejos (born 5 January 1947, Basco, Batanes, Philippines) is a Filipino politician and former Governor of the province of Batanes, Philippines. On September 3, 2008, he was injured in an ambush in Pasay while being driven home.
