= Uyugan =

Municipality in Batanes, Philippines

- Municipality
- Municipality of Uyugan
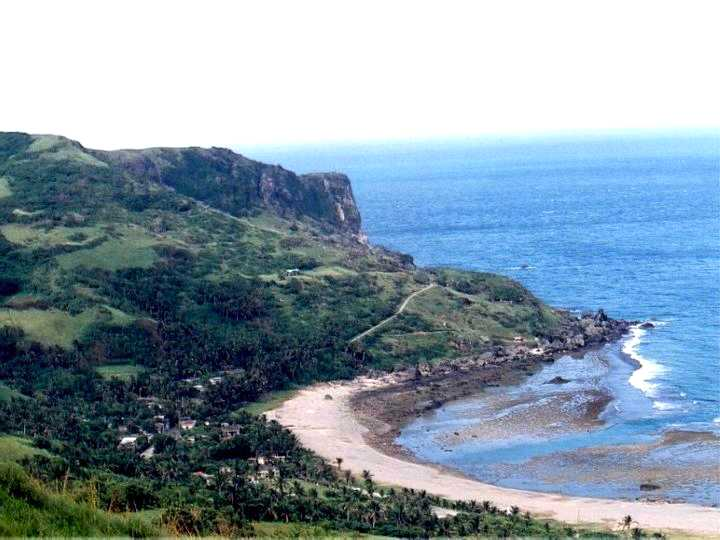
- Uyugan landscape

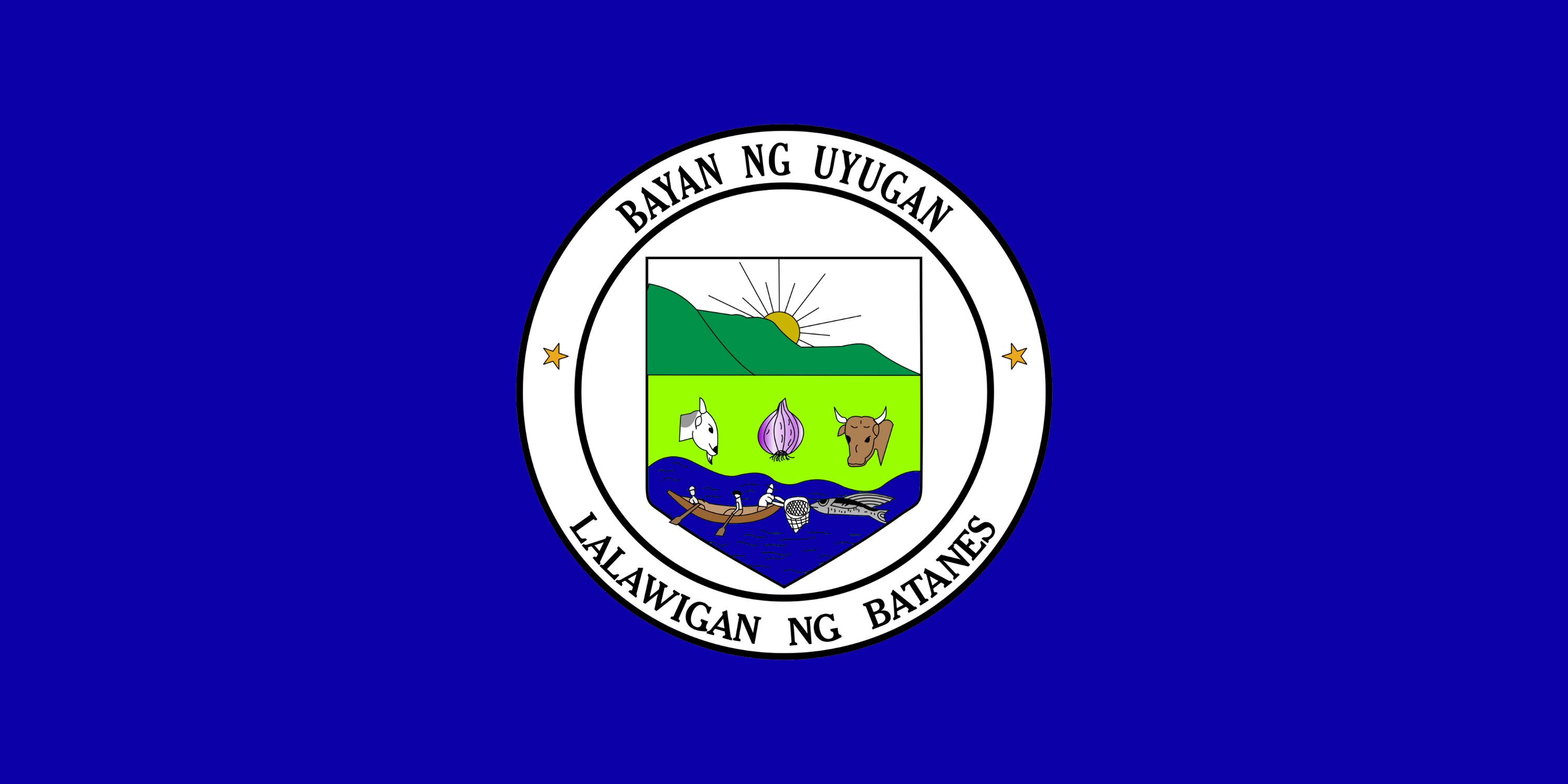
- Flag Seal

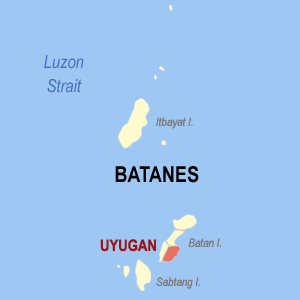
- Map of Batanes with Uyugan highlighted
- Interactive map of Uyugan
- Location within the Philippines Uyugan (Luzon) Uyugan (Batanes)
- Coordinates: 20°21′N 121°56′E
- Country: Philippines
- Region: Cagayan Valley
- Province: Batanes
- District: Lone district
- Founded: May 20, 1909
- Barangays: 4 (see Barangays)

Government
  - Type: Sangguniang Bayan
  - Mayor: Richard Cabugao
  - Vice Mayor: Felix Adami
  - Representative: Ciriaco B. Gato Jr.
  - Municipal Council: Members: Baldo Baldomar; Purong Ybay; Boyan Bugador; Ronald Mg Garibay; Casiano Adami; Andy Ybay; Bernard Delos Santos; Rolly Cabugao
  - Electorate: 1,188 voters (2025)

Area
  - Total: 16.28 km^{2} (6.29 sq mi)
- Elevation: 13.7 m (45 ft)
- Highest elevation: 1,011 m (3,317 ft)
- Lowest elevation: 0 m (0 ft)

Population (2024 census)
  - Total: 1,466
  - Density: 90.05/km^{2} (233.2/sq mi)
  - Households: 399

Economy
  - Income class: 5th municipal income class
  - Poverty incidence: 7.68% (2023)
  - Revenue: ₱ 60.26 million (2024)
  - Assets: ₱ 141.5 million (2024)
  - Expenditure: ₱ 61.37 million (2024)
  - Liabilities: ₱ 43.06 million (2024)

Service provider
  - Electricity: Batanes Electric Cooperative (BATANELCO)
- Time zone: UTC+8 (PST)
- ZIP code: 3903
- PSGC: 0200906000
- IDD : area code: +63 (0)78
- Native languages: Ivatan; Tagalog; Ilocano
- Website: uyuganbatanes.gov.ph

Uyugan, officially the Municipality of Uyugan (Note: Ivatan: Kavahayan nu Uyugan; Ilocano: Ili ti Uyugan; Tagalog: Bayan ng Uyugan), is a municipality in the province of Batanes, Philippines. According to the 2024 census, it has a population of 1,466 people.

== History ==
Thousands of years before Spanish colonization, about a thousand people lived on fortified cliffs and hilltops scattered across today's Uyugan. The fortified settlements were called "Idiang", derived from the Ivatan word "Idi" or "Idian" which means home or hometown. They belonged to the Ivatan tribes and spoke the same Ivatan language, but with a different accent.

The Ivatan tribes who called the place home farmed - where the soil permitted - and fished. They were also a boat-making and seafaring people, and they traded with neighboring Taiwan to the north and Cagayan to the south.

The Ivatan tribal settlements had a de facto tribal government, not very much different from that of tribal governments in the earlier stages of human evolution. The tribal settlement was headed by a chieftain with a deputy.

Inter-tribal hostilities (Arap du Tukon) or War on the Hill were common in those days, but was for men only. Customary law prohibited the harming of womenfolk, who were the main providers of food in wartime.

In the late 1600s, Dominican missionaries landed in Batanes. The native inhabitants were, in the beginning, hostile to the early Spanish colonizers. Slowly, they were able to adopt themselves to Spanish rule. The Spaniards had lifestyles, beliefs, and traditions that were different from what the Ivatan tribespeople were accustomed. Neither were able to completely understand the other's social customs, nature, religious beliefs, or love of the land.

According to church records, the first mass and baptism in the islands were celebrated in what is now Imnajbu in Uyugan. The Spanish missionaries, finding the conditions harsh in Batanes, attempted to resettle the Ivatans in Cagayan, but they always found their way home, sailing back to Batanes.

In 1782, Spanish Governor-General Jose Basco y Vargas sent an expedition to formally get the consent of the Ivatans to become subjects of the King of Spain.

On June 26, 1783, de facto Ivatan independence was lost when on that day (called Batanes Day today) the representatives of the Spanish Crown met the representatives of the chiefs and nobles of Batanes on the Plains of Vasay (in what is now Basco) for the ceremonial formal annexation of Batanes to the Spanish Empire.

The new province was named Provincia de la Conception. Governor-General Jose Basco y Vargas was named "Conde de la Conquista de Batanes" and the capital town of Basco was named after him. The Dominican Order established missions, among them the San Jose de Ivana mission which included all of present-day Uyugan and Sabtang.

The Americans followed the Spaniards to Batanes after the Spanish naval defeat at Manila Bay. The USS Princeton dropped anchor at Basco Bay in February 1900. In 1901, the province was reclassified to a township, but provincial status was restored in 1909, and with it the creation of Uyugan as a separate township (municipality).

The American public school system, and a general health and sanitation campaign were introduced at around this time. In the 1930s, the Americans built a better road system that replaced the road system (El Camino Real) built during the Spanish period.

== Geography ==
Uyugan is located at 20°21′N 121°56′E in the south-eastern part of Batan Island, bounded on the north by Mahatao, south by the Balintang Channel, east by the Philippine Sea, and west by Ivana. Uyugan is located at 20°21′N 121°56′E

According to the Philippine Statistics Authority, the municipality has a land area of 16.28 square kilometres (6.29 sq mi) constituting 7.43% of the 219.01-square-kilometre- (84.56 sq mi) total area of Batanes.

The Uyugan town proper (Centro or Idi to the Isantoninos) is 19 kilometres (12 mi) from Basco, the provincial capital. It is located along the banks of what was once a brook, a kilometer east of the Ivana-Uyugan border.

There are two other major settlements in the municipality situated along the Pacific seaboard: Itbud and Imnajbu. Itbud is 4 kilometres (2.5 mi) from the town proper or Centro while Imnajbu is 2 kilometres (1.2 mi) farther north-east.

The land is varied. It changes from rocky hills along the coasts to grassy and forest hills in the interior. Most of the land has been cleared for farming.

In the language of the Ivatans, Uyugan means place of flowing water—which is never far away except in the town proper itself: Today's brook bed that cuts the town proper in half dried up during severe earthquakes in 1918.

=== Barangays ===
Uyugan is politically subdivided into four barangays. Each barangay consists of puroks and some have sitios.

PSGC	Barangay	Population			±% p.a.	
		2024		2010		
020906002	Imnajbu	12.2%	179	159	▴	0.83%
020906003	Itbud	36.2%	531	463	▴	0.96%
020906004	Kayuganan (Poblacion)	22.4%	329	294	▴	0.78%
020906001	Kayvaluganan (Poblacion)	29.1%	427	324	▴	1.93%
	Total		1,466	1,240	▴	1.17%

=== Climate ===
Climate data for Uyugan, Batanes
Month	Jan	Feb	Mar	Apr	May	Jun	Jul	Aug	Sep	Oct	Nov	Dec	Year
Mean daily maximum °C (°F)	23 (73)	23 (73)	24 (75)	26 (79)	28 (82)	29 (84)	29 (84)	29 (84)	28 (82)	27 (81)	26 (79)	24 (75)	26 (79)
Mean daily minimum °C (°F)	22 (72)	22 (72)	23 (73)	25 (77)	27 (81)	28 (82)	28 (82)	28 (82)	27 (81)	26 (79)	25 (77)	23 (73)	25 (78)
Average precipitation mm (inches)	44 (1.7)	35 (1.4)	29 (1.1)	48 (1.9)	204 (8.0)	238 (9.4)	291 (11.5)	325 (12.8)	304 (12.0)	202 (8.0)	141 (5.6)	60 (2.4)	1,921 (75.8)
Average rainy days	11.1	9.1	8.3	9.2	15.7	17.1	19.4	21.9	21.1	18.4	16.3	12.4	180
Source: Meteoblue

Uyugan's climate ranges from humid oceanic to sub-tropic. The Philippine Sea/Pacific Ocean to the east moderate the climate—cooling summers. It is coldest in January and warmest in May.

January temperatures average 20 °C (68 °F). May's average temperatures range from 30 to 35 °C (86 to 95 °F).

The average (mean) annual air temperature is less than 10 °C (50 °F) in January, but it is much more changeable in north-eastern Uyugan (Imnajbu).

Precipitation is heaviest during the non-summer months brought in by the typhoons that frequent the area. Uyugan's annual rainfall varies, but is highest in the north and lowest in the south. The heaviest rainfalls happen in a belt lying inland from Mount Chakarangan in north-western Uyugan (Songet) to Mount Vatohayao in north-eastern Uyugan (Imnajbu).

The weather is foggy at the onset of the colder months, caused by the cold polar air from the north (Continental Asia/Siberia) meeting warm moist air from the south.

== Demographics ==
Population census of Uyugan
Year	Pop.	±% p.a.
1918	855	—
1939	1,038	+0.93%
1948	1,208	+1.70%
1960	1,029	−1.33%
1970	1,058	+0.28%
1975	1,115	+1.06%
1980	1,122	+0.13%
1990	1,198	+0.66%
1995	1,265	+1.02%
2000	1,268	+0.05%
2007	1,203	−0.72%
2010	1,240	+1.11%
2015	1,297	+0.86%
2020	1,380	+1.31%
2024	1,466	+1.46%
Source: Philippine Statistics Authority

In the 2024 census, Uyugan had a population of 1,466. The population density was 90 inhabitants per square kilometre (230/sq mi).

Uyugan's population has not changed much since its founding as a separate township (municipality) on May 20, 1909. Its population is around a tenth of the population of Batanes.

Half of Uyugan's population lives in the town proper or Uyugan Centro that comprises the barangays of Kayuganan and Kayvaluganan. The other half live in Itbud and Imnajbu.

The four Uyugan barangays or municipal districts along the coasts and brooks. They grew up there because of the sea and fresh waters necessary for their livelihood. All of the barangays have a main street as the core of their socio-economic life.

Most of the people speak Ivatan as their first language, and most speak Ilocano, Tagalog, and English as their second languages.

== Economy ==
Poverty incidence of Uyugan (%)

Source: Philippine Statistics Authority

The Uyugan economy is mainly agriculture and fishing.

Farming in Uyugan began long before the arrival of the Spaniards. The Ivatans loved the land and cultivated many plants for food.

Isantonino farmers started with root crops, but when the Spaniards arrived, they learned to grow other crops, while introducing livestock and vegetables. Farming meant growing root crops—often just enough to feed the farmer's family.

Camoté and other root crops became Uyugan's most hardy and widely grown crops, but in the 1950s, livestock became more important than root crops on Uyugan farms. The government brought breeding bulls and the farmers moved to "mixed" farming on a small scale.

Uyugan's farms are not scientific, but government agricultural extension workers give direction and support to farming methods. The farmers seldom have problems like plant and animal diseases and pests.

Today's Isantonino farmer still could barely feed his family due to antiquated methods of farming dictated mainly by the topography of the land that at best is unsuitable to agriculture. Nevertheless, Uyugan was a leading producer of beef cattle and garlic prior to the global economy.

Fishing plays a role in partly meeting the fish requirements of the municipality. Fishing methods use hook and line and cast nets.

Situated north of Imnajbu is Madi Bay in Mahatao, one of the richest fishing grounds in all of mainland Batanes, where Isantoninos (Uyugan) along with Isancarnos (Mahatao) and other Ivatans (Ivasays) engaged in coastal fishing.

== Government ==
=== Local government ===
Uyugan, belonging to the lone congressional district of the province of Batanes, is governed by a mayor designated as its local chief executive and by a municipal council as its legislative body in accordance with the Local Government Code. The mayor, vice mayor, and the councilors are elected directly by the people through an election which is being held every three years.

=== Elected officials ===
Members of the Municipal Council (2025–2028)
Position	Name
Congressman	Ciriaco B. Gato Jr.
Mayor	Richard Cabugao
Vice-Mayor	Felix Adami
Councilors	Baldo Baldomar
Councilors	Purong Ybay
Councilors	Boyan Bugador
Councilors	Ronald Mg Garibay
Councilors	Casiano Adami
Councilors	Andy Ybay
Councilors	Bernard Delos Santos
Councilors	Rolly Cabugao

== Education ==
The Schools Division of Batanes governs the town's public education system. The division office is a field office of the DepEd in Cagayan Valley region. The Ivana-Uyugan Schools District Office governs the public and private elementary and public and private high schools throughout the municipality.

=== Primary and elementary schools ===
- Imnajbu Elementary School
- Uyugan Elementary School

=== Secondary school ===
- Itbud Integrated School

== Culture ==
The town hosts a branch of the National Museum of the Philippines in Barangay Itbud.

It is also home to the Uyugan Church, a Spanish-era Roman Catholic church built in 1871. Several churches can also be found in the town including the Our Lady of the Miraculous Medal Parish Shrine in Barangay Itbud and the San Lorenzo Ruiz Chapel in Barangay Imnajbu, where traditionally recognized as the site where the first mass in Batanes was celebrated in 1682.

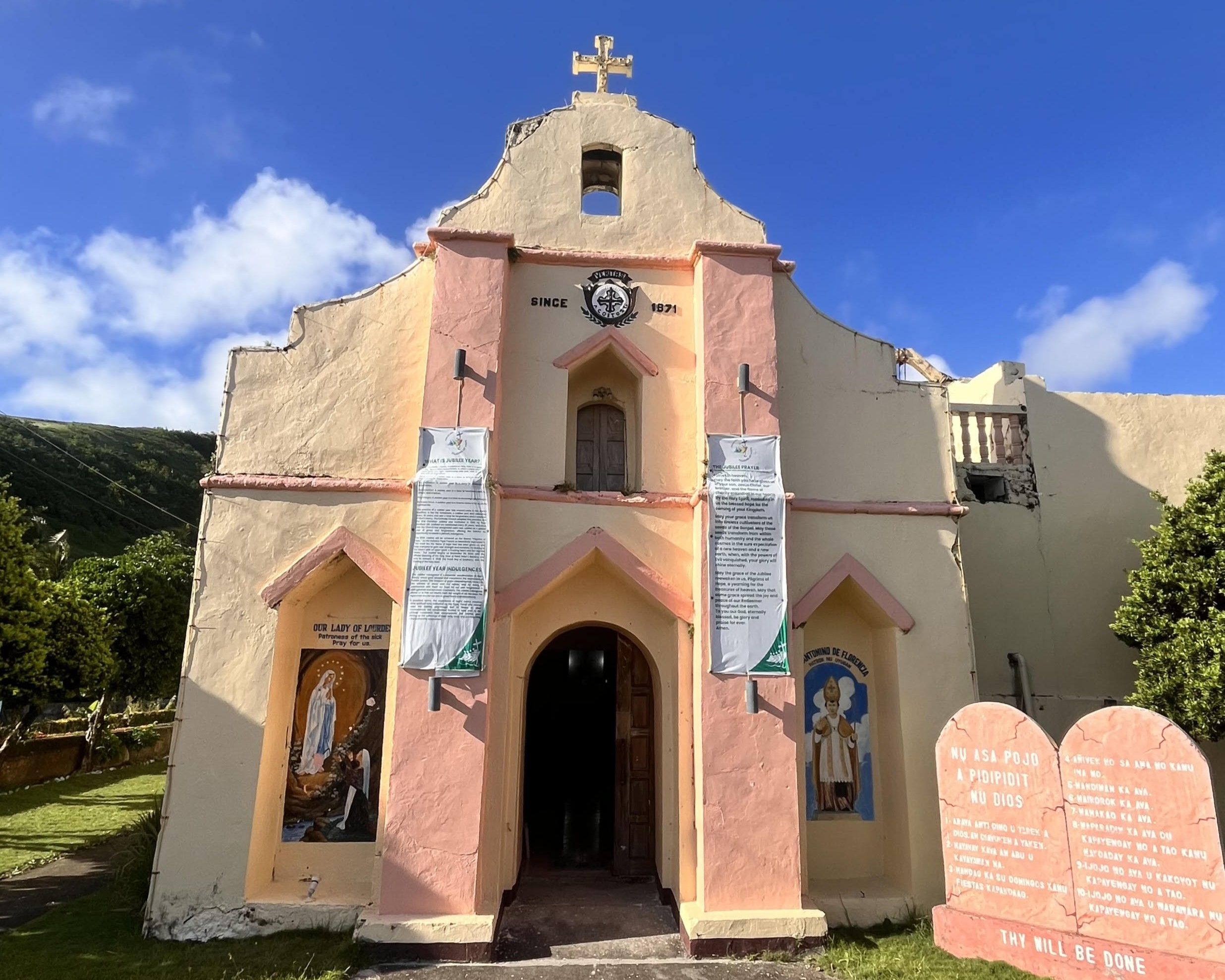
San Antonino de Florencia Parish Church (Uyugan Church).

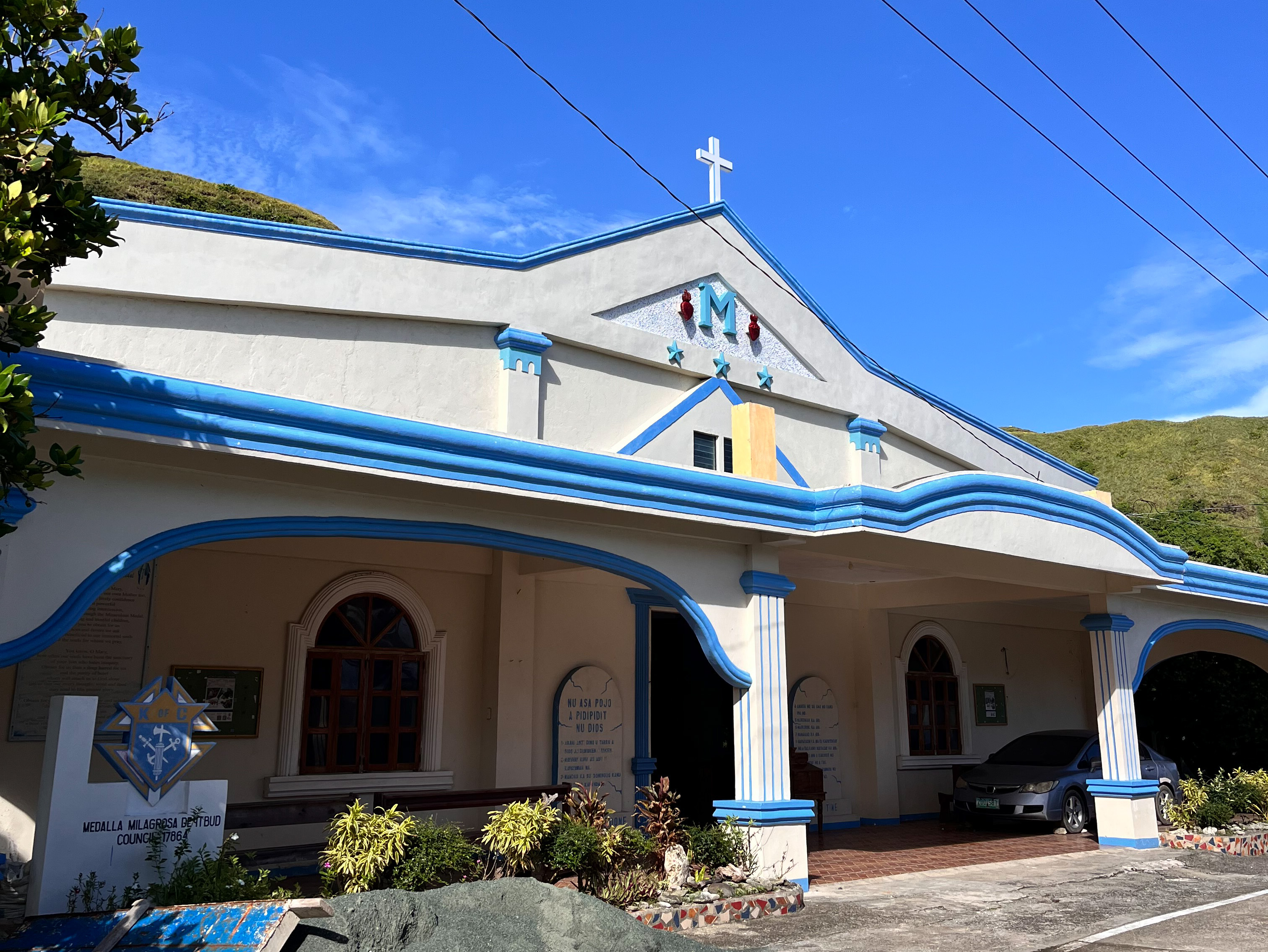
Our Lady of the Miraculous Medal Parish Shrine in Itbud.

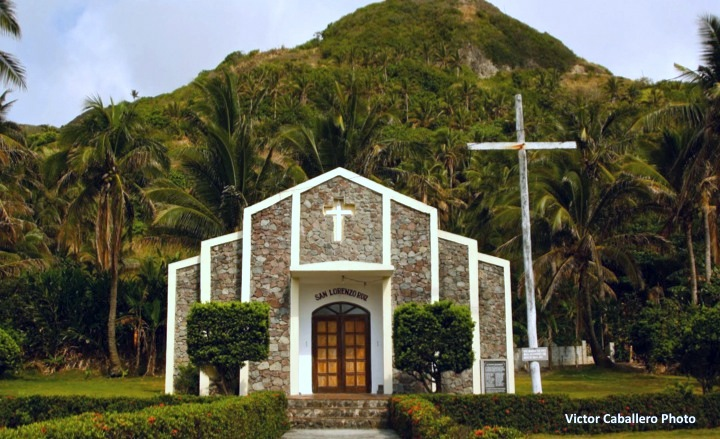
San Lorenzo Ruiz Chapel in Imnajbu.
