= Basco Lighthouse =

Lighthouse in the Batanes, Philippines

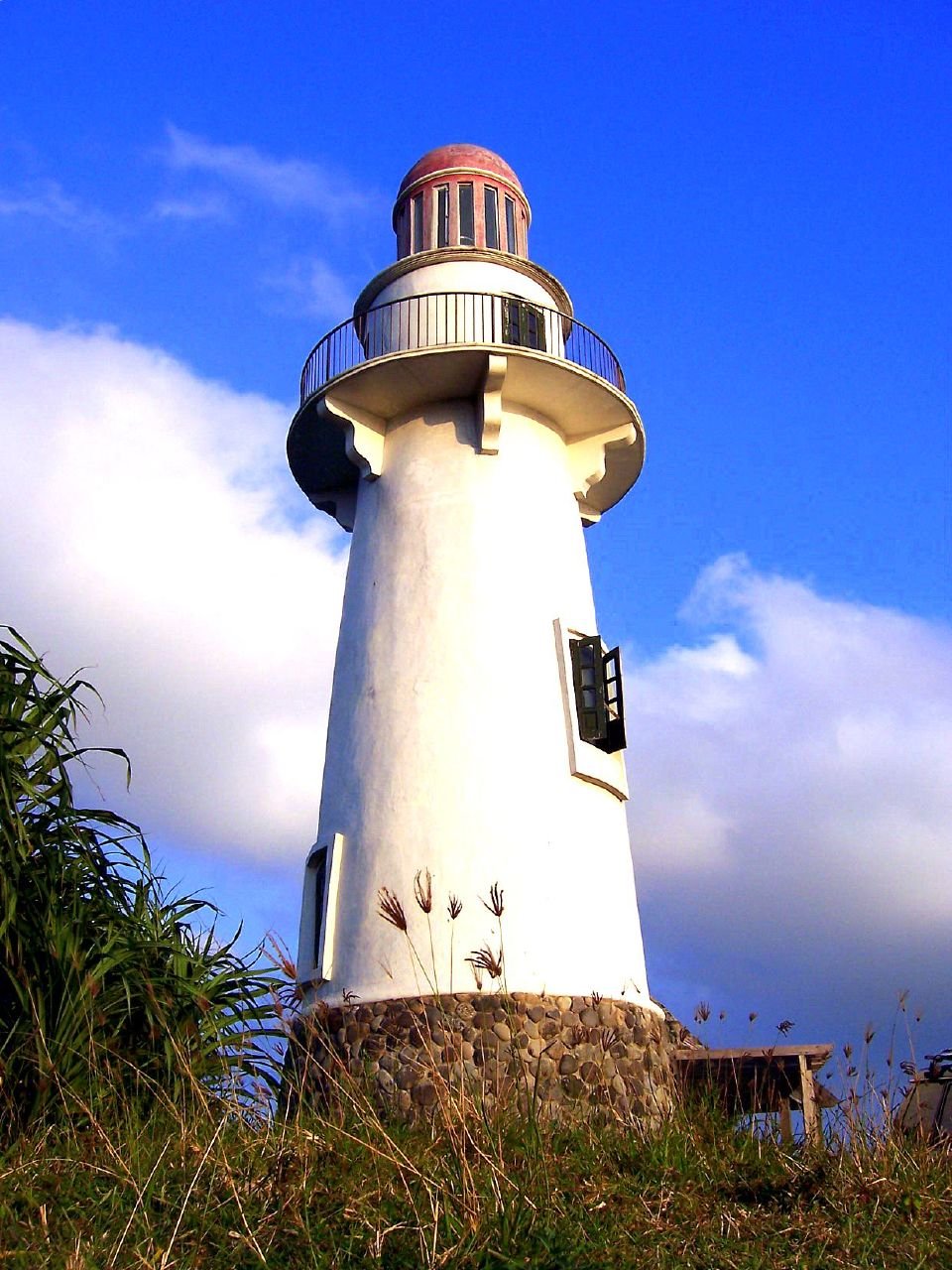
- Location: Basco, Batanes, Philippines
- Coordinates: 20°27′05″N 121°57′52″E

Tower
- Constructed: 2003
- Construction: rubble (foundation), reinforced concrete (tower)
- Height: 20 m (66 ft)
- Shape: tapered cylindrical tower with balcony and lantern
- Markings: white (tower), red (lantern), red (trim)

Light
- First lit: 2003
- Focal height: 20 m (66 ft)
- Range: 10 nmi (19 km; 12 mi)
- Characteristic: Fl W 4s

Basco Lighthouse is a lighthouse in the town of Basco in Batanes, the northernmost province in the Philippines. Located in Naidi Hills in Barangay San Antonio, the lush green hills and the open sea provide a beautiful backdrop for the lighthouse. The place can easily be reached by a 1.2-km (3/4 mile) hike from the Port of Basco.

== History ==
Basco Lighthouse is one of the three lighthouses proposed by former Congressman Florencio Abad of Batanes, not only as working lighthouses, but possibly as tourist attractions. The other two are in Sabtang and Mahatao. The Basco structure was the first completed in 2003.

The location chosen is where the first lighthouse of Basco was built. It was also the site of the American period telegraph facilities that connected Batanes with the central government until it was destroyed by the Japanese Imperial Army bombings at the start of World War II. A few of the buildings survived and some have been converted into businesses like a café - resulting from the area becoming popular because of the lighthouse.

== Architecture ==
The structure is a 6-story building with a gallery or viewing deck on the fifth floor. Located next to the 66 feet (20 m) tower is a dwelling of vernacular architecture. Traditional Ivatan houses are made with stone or rubble masonry.

The viewing deck is a perfect location to view the whole of Batan Island (the main island where Basco is located) from end to end, including Mount Iraya. One can also have a clear view of Sabtang Island in the south of Basco and Itbayat Island to the north.

== See also ==
- List of lighthouses in the Philippines
