= Mahatao Church =

Roman Catholic church in Batanes, Philippines

- San Carlos Borromeo Parish Church
- Saint Charles Borromeo Parish Church
- Iglesia Parroquial de San Carlos Borromeo (Spanish)
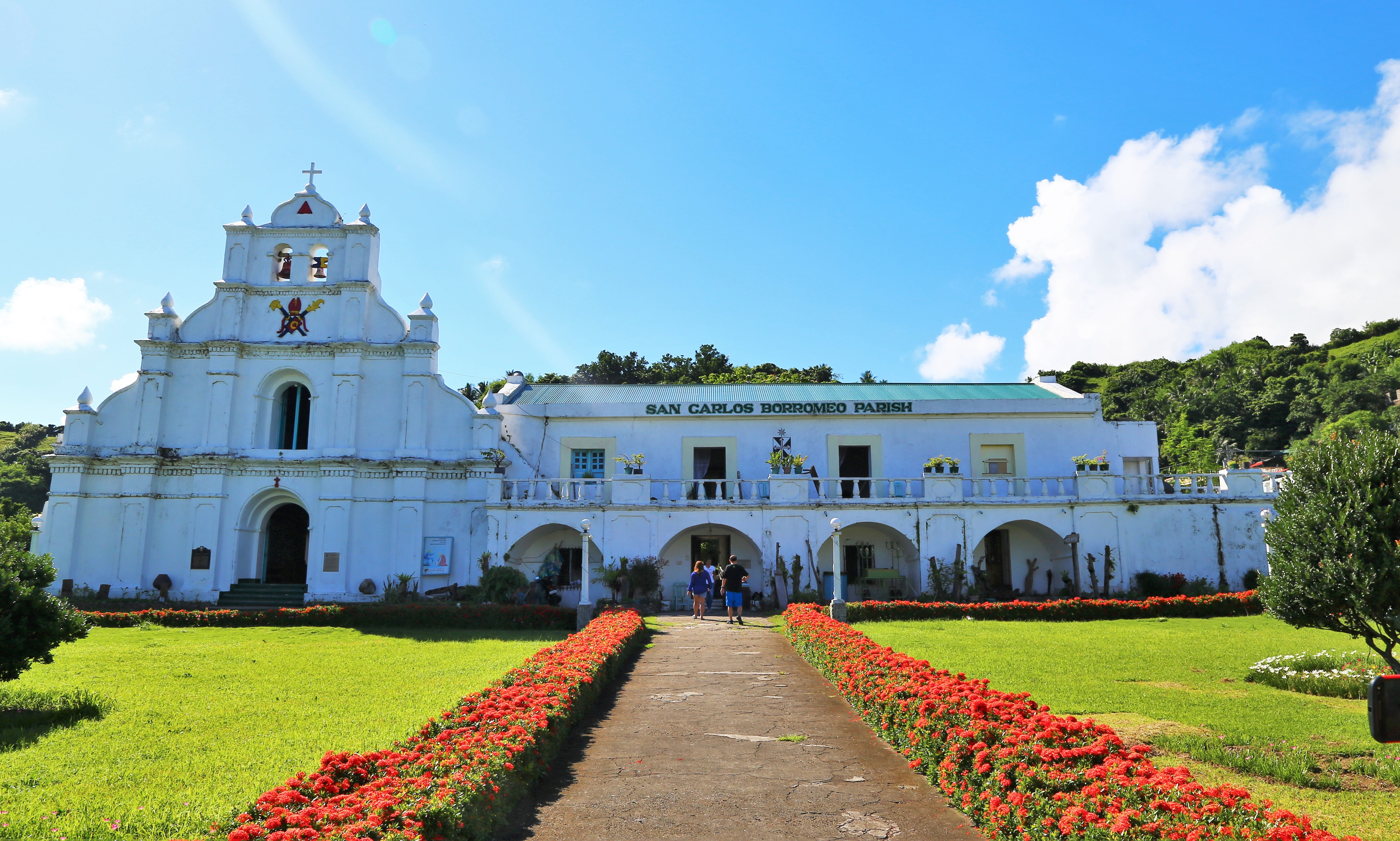
- The church in 2018

- Location in Batanes Location in Luzon Location in the Philippines
- 20°24′57″N 121°56′49″E
- Location: Mahatao, Batan Island, Batanes
- Country: Philippines
- Denomination: Roman Catholic

History
- Status: Parish church
- Dedication: St. Charles Borromeo

Architecture
- Functional status: Active
- Heritage designation: National Cultural Treasure
- Designated: July 31, 2001
- Architectural type: Church building
- Style: Baroque

Administration
- Archdiocese: Tuguegarao
- Diocese: Prelature of Batanes

Clergy
- Archbishop: Ricardo Baccay
- Bishop: Danilo Ulep

San Carlos Borromeo Parish Church, commonly known as Mahatao Church, is a Roman Catholic church located in Mahatao, Batan Island, Batanes, Philippines. It is under the jurisdiction of the Territorial Prelature of Batanes. The church's titular is Saint Charles Borromeo whose feast is celebrated every November 4. Its beauty and excellent state of preservation made it a National Cultural Treasure by the National Museum of the Philippines on July 31, 2001.

== History ==
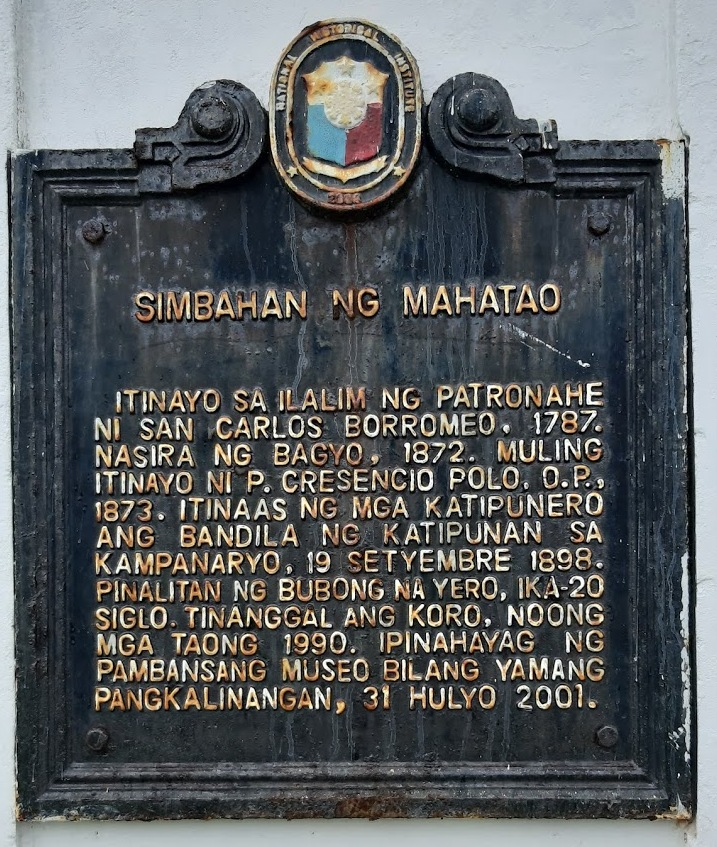
Church NHI historical marker

The town of Mahatao was first mentioned in history in 1720 with Fr. Juan Bel's report of villages in Batan Island. When Batanes became a part of the Philippines and as a consequence, a Spanish colony, Mahatao was founded as an ecclesiastical mission by the Dominicans in 1783. It was first a dependency of Basco, and placed under the advocacy of St. Bartholomew the Apostle but its patron saint and protector became St. Charles Borromeo later on, as stated in a report by Lieutenant Governor Joaquin del Castillo on May 6, 1792.

The earliest church in Mahatao was constructed in 1787. It was initially made of light materials but underwent modifications that by the time Mahatao evolved from being a visita to a vicariate under Fr. Tomas Sanchez albeit unofficially in 1789, the first stone church in Mahatao was built.

The first church was said to be ugly so when it was partially damaged during a very strong typhoon in 1872, then Vicar Fr. Crescencio Polo saw to the reconstruction of a stronger and more artistic structure in 1873, covering the roof with cogon. Fr. Polo also remodeled the convent made of stone and mortar, which is attached to the church.

On September 19, 1898, the Katipunan revolutionaries ransacked the church. There were records that during this time, the original gold Episcopal crosier of the image of San Carlos as well as the gold jewelry pieces of the Lady of the Rosary and the Sto. Niño were stolen.

Parish Priests of San Carlos Borromeo Parish Church of Mahatao
Parish Priest	Inclusive Dates
Fr. Tomas Sanchez; First vicar of Mahatao	
Fr. Roman Naranjo and Fr. Joaquin Ferrer	
Rev. Fr. Nicolas Gonzales, O.P.	1852-1871
Rev. Fr. Crescencio Polo, O.P.	1871-1883
Rev. Fr. Enrique Platero, O.P.	1883-1884
Rev. Fr. Manuel Blasco, O.P.	1884-1889
Rev. Fr. Anastacio Idigoras, O.P.	1889-1892
Rev. Fr. Joaquin Comblor, O.P.	1895-1901
Rev. Fr. Jose Serres, O.P.	1901-1904
Rev. Fr. Juan Gomez, O.P.	1904-1907
Rev. Fr. Emilio Miguel, O.P.	1907-1913
Rev. Fr. Vicente Gonzalez, O.P.	1913-1918
Rev. Fr. Jesus Fernandez, O.P.	1918-1925
Rev. Fr. Emilio Ramos, O.P.	1925-1929
Rev. Fr. Julio Gonzalez, O.P.	1929-1941
Rev. Fr. Andres Pacho, O.P	1949-1954
Rev. Fr. Alfredo Castañon, O.P.	1954-1955
Rev. Fr. Julio Gonzalez, O.P.	1955-1981
Rev. Fr. Antonio Gonzalez, O.P.	March 1981- April 1989
Rev. Fr. Domingo Deniz, O.P.	April 1989- December 1989
Rev. Fr. Antonio Gonzalez, O.P.	December 1989- February 1998
Rev. Fr. Mariano G. Martires	1998-2002
Rev. Fr. Vincent A. Yee Concepcion	2002 - Oct. 2002
Rev. Jonathan N. Bailon, Administrator	2002-2003
Rev. Fr. Javier B. Fria	June 2003 - November 2004
Rev. Fr. Robert T. Young	Dec. 2004- Jun. 2007
Rev. Fr. Brigido R. Casas	Current parish priest

== Architectural features ==
Closeup of façade, showing the espadaña belfry

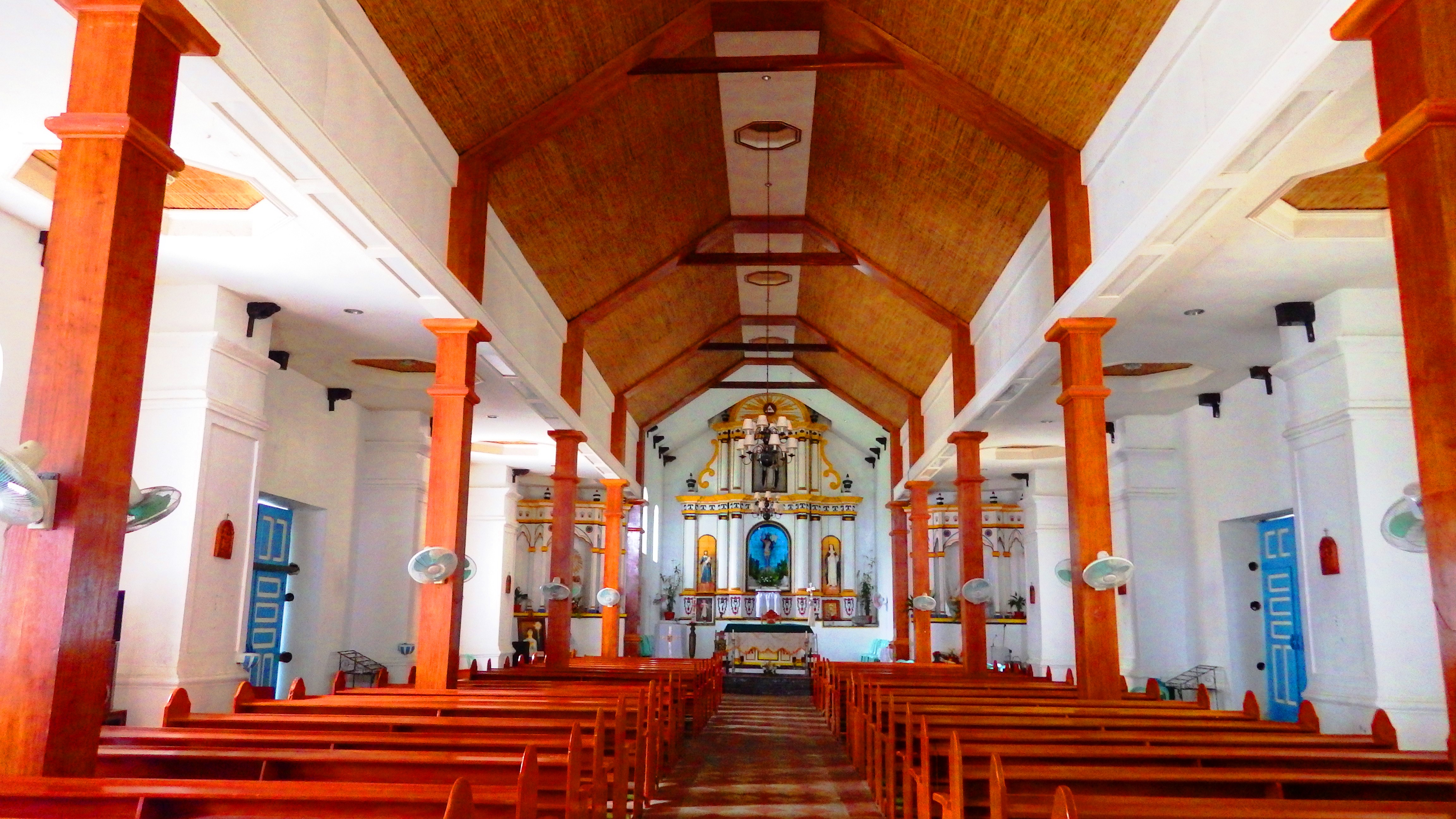
Church interior in 2014

The church is made of stone and lime, common building materials in Batanes. An espadaña belfry is located on top of the facade's pediment with one of its bells dated 1874. The church has uneven wall thickness due to addition of step buttresses and even buttress walls. Its interiors, decorated in Baroque style, showcase floral designs sunburst ornaments painted in polychrome and gilt which lends a golden glow among the statuary. The main retablo houses images of Saint Charles Borromeo, patron, on the center and surrounded by Saint Joseph, Saint Dominic de Guzman and Saint Rose of Lima. Two minor altar housing the image of the Our Lady of the Rosary on the right and of the Holy Child on the left of the central altar can also be found.

On the right side of the facade is the church convent. The second floor of the convent is not the typical volada or cantilevered gallery for convents in the Philippines but an open extended deck. At the back of the convent are remains of an old circular well. Located on the left side of the facade is a beacon used for navigation.
