= Camilo Diaz Gregorio =

Filipino Roman Catholic bishop (1939–2018)

The Most Reverend Camilo D. Gregorio
- Bishop-Prelate of Batanes
- Church: Catholic Church
- See: Territorial Prelature of Batanes
- Installed: 13 September 2003
- Term ended: 20 May 2017
- Predecessor: Jose P. Salazar
- Successor: Danilo Bangayan Ulep
- Previous posts: Auxiliary Bishop of Cebu (1987–1989); Bishop of Bacolod (1989–2000)

Orders
- Ordination: 1 December 1963 by Luigi Traglia
- Consecration: 29 March 1987 by Jose Tomas Sanchez

Personal details
- Born: September 25, 1939 Cuyapo, Nueva Ecija, Philippines
- Died: May 21, 2018 (aged 78)
- Residence: Palacio Nu Obispo; Basco, Batanes 3009
- Occupation: Prelate (bishop)
- Education: University of Santo Tomas
- Motto: Servire in Caritate ('Serving in Love')
- Coat of arms

Camilo Diaz Gregorio (25 September 1939 – 21 May 2018) was a Roman Catholic bishop.

Diaz Gregorio was born in the Philippines and was ordained to the priesthood in 1963. He served as auxiliary bishop of Girus and as auxiliary bishop of the Roman Catholic Archdiocese of Cebu, Philippines from 1987 to 1989. Diaz Gregorio then served as bishop of the Roman Catholic Diocese of Bacolod from 1989 to 2000 and then served as bishop of the Roman Catholic Territorial Prelature of Batanes from 2003 to 2017.
