= Mahatao Forward Operating Base =

Military establishment in the Philippines

- Mahatao, Batanes, Philippines

Site information
- Type: Forward operating base
- Controlled by: Philippine Navy; Philippine Marine Corps

Location
- Coordinates: 20°25′11.8″N 121°56′47.3″E

Site history
- Built: August 28, 2025
- Built by: Philippines
- In use: 2025–present

The Mahatao Forward Operating Base is a military base in Mahatao, Batanes, the Philippines.

== History ==
The Northern Luzon Command of the Armed Forces of the Philippines (AFP) inaugurated the Mahatao Forward Operating Base on August 28, 2025. Plans to open a base in Mahatao is already present in April 2024.

== Facilities ==
The Mahatao Forward Operating Base is situated on Batan Island which is under the municipality of Mahatao in Batanes province. It is intended to host units of the Philippine Navy and Philippine Marine Corps under the Northern Luzon Naval Command and Marine Battalion Landing Team-10.
