= Basco Cathedral =

Roman Catholic church in Batanes, Philippines

- Cathedral of the Immaculate Conception
- Santo Domingo de Guzman Parish Church
- Katedral ng Mahal na Birhen ng Kalinis-linisang Paglilihi (Filipino); Catedral de Nuestra Señora de la Inmaculada Concepción (Spanish)
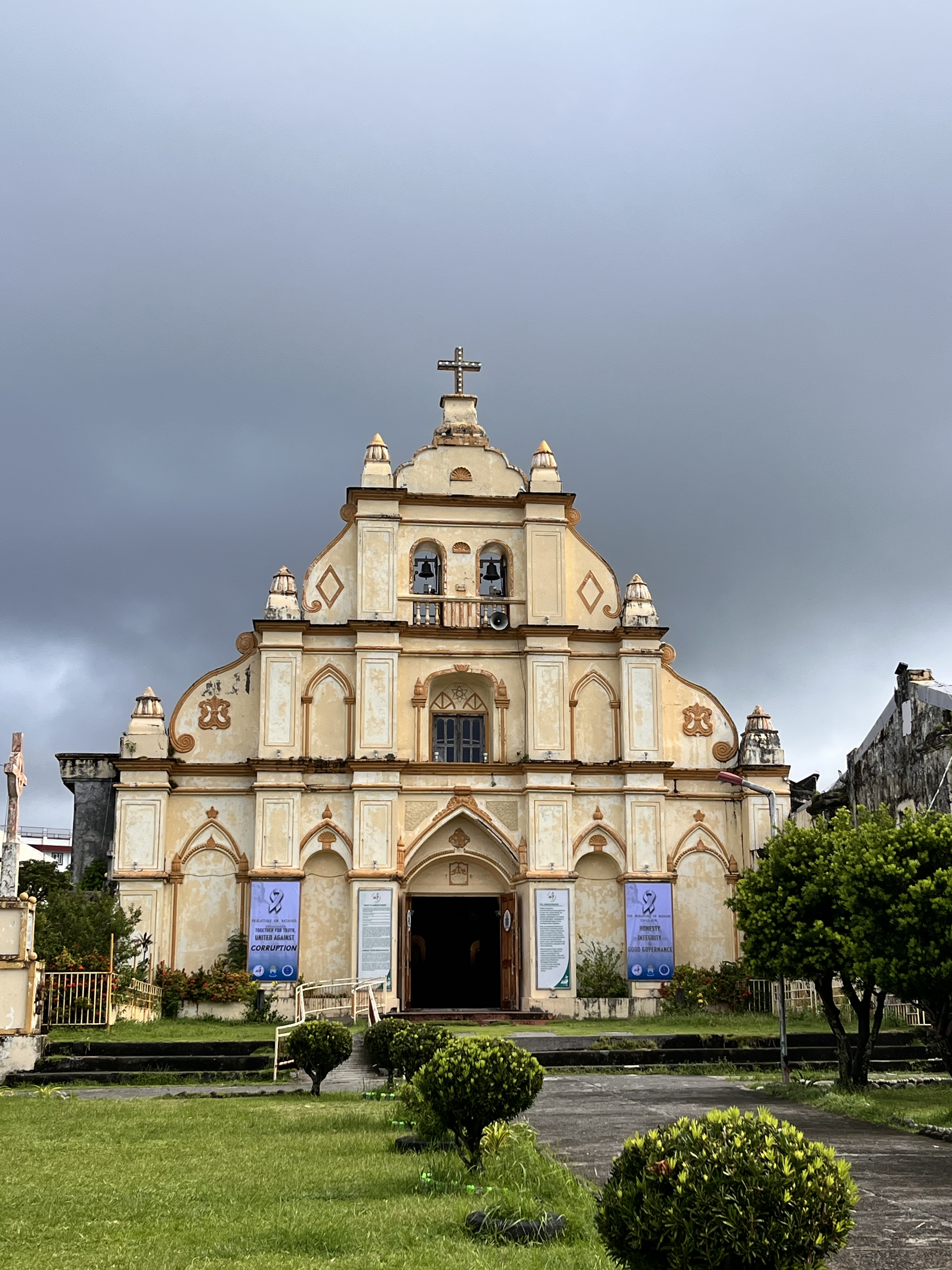
- Basco Cathedral in 2025

- Location in Batanes Location in Luzon Location in the Philippines
- 20°27′03″N 121°58′09″E
- Location: Basco, Batanes
- Country: Philippines
- Denomination: Roman Catholic

History
- Status: Cathedral
- Dedication: Immaculate Conception, Dominic de Guzman

Architecture
- Functional status: Active
- Architectural type: Church building
- Style: Spanish mission
- Completed: 1812, 1950, 2011
- Demolished: 2000

Administration
- Province: Tuguegarao
- Metropolis: Tuguegarao
- Diocese: Prelature of Batanes

Clergy
- Bishop: Danilo B. Ulep

The Cathedral of the Immaculate Conception, commonly known as Santo Domingo de Guzman Parish Church and Basco Cathedral, is a Roman Catholic cathedral church located in Basco, Northern Batan Island, Batanes, Philippines. It is the episcopal seat to the Territorial Prelature of Batanes.

Because Batanes was named Provincia de la Concepcion in religious records at the time of its establishment, the first church was dedicated to Our Lady of the Immaculate Conception, Patroness of Batanes Prelature. It is speculated that the image of the Immaculate Conception was brought to Batanes during the 1783 expedition. As a parish church, it bears the name Santo Domingo Church, in honor of Saint Dominic de Guzman, the patron saint of the capital of Batanes, which is Basco, while it was dedicated to the Immaculate Conception as a cathedral.

== History ==
With the establishment of Basco town on June 26, 1783, came the evangelical mission headed by Dominican Fathers Bartholome Artiguez and Baltazar Calderon. The first church was built in Basco town and was made of cogon and wood.

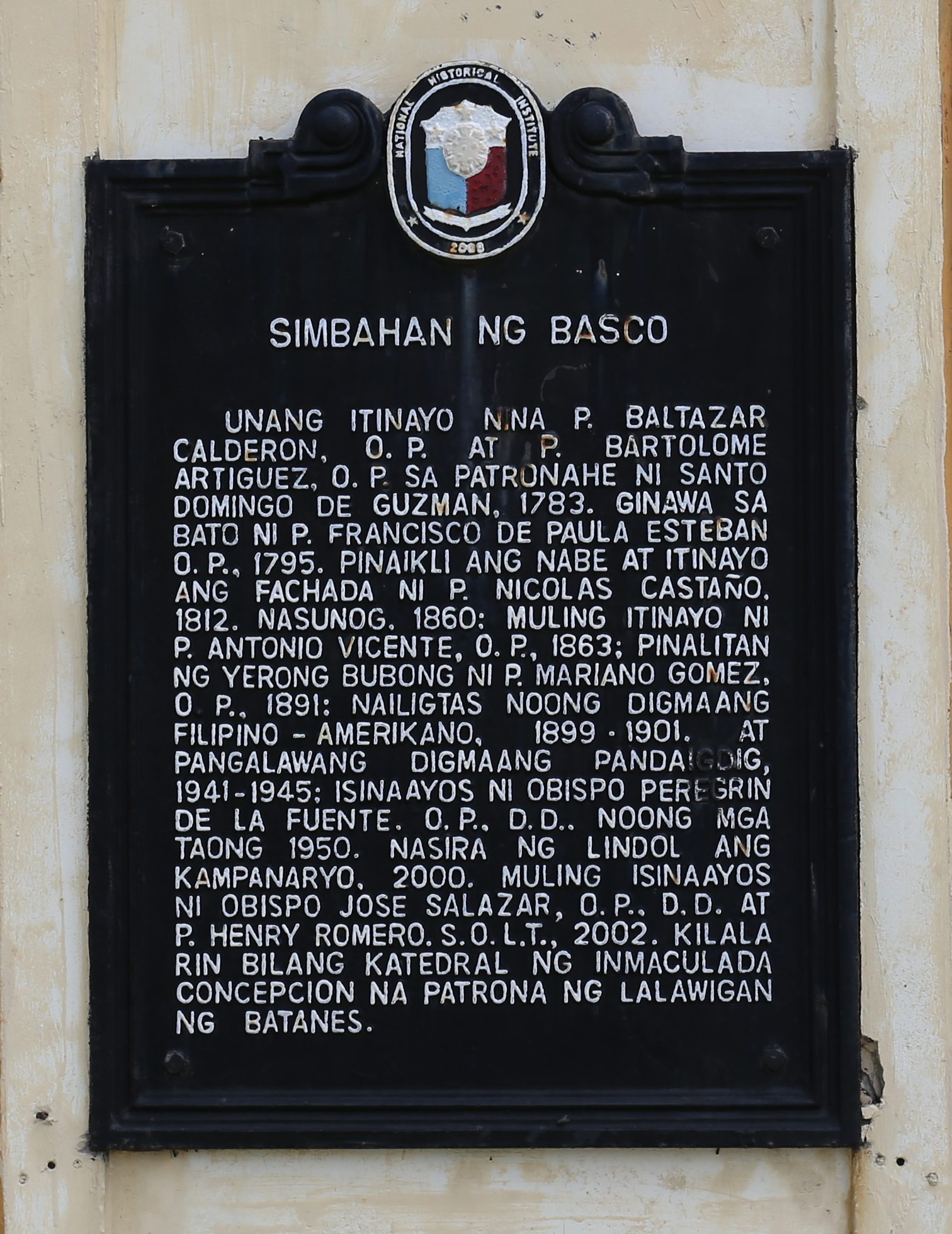
The cathedral’s NHI marker installed in 2008.

Around 1795, due to frequent fires and typhoons that destroyed buildings, stone churches were started to be built, made possible by imported masons, stone cutters, and carpenters from Cagayan. People began to use lime not as just condiment for betel nut chew, but for constructing walls in combination with sand and stone. During this time, construction of the stone church of Basco took place, with Fr. Nicolas Castaño designing the façade in 1812, and the convent in 1814.

The church has undergone renovations in response to disasters. It was burned and reconstructed at around 1860 to 1863, and was refurbished in 1950. The church was badly damaged in the earthquake of July 2000. Under Bishop Jose Salazar, O.P, the cathedral was rebuilt in its original form, which was completed in 2011.

On March 27, 2008, the National Historical Institute (now known as the National Historical Commission of the Philippines) installed a marker designating it a Level II Historic Site. The marker highlights the church's founding by Dominican missionaries in 1783, its construction using stone and lime in 1795, and its role as the center of the first parish established in Batanes.

== Gallery ==
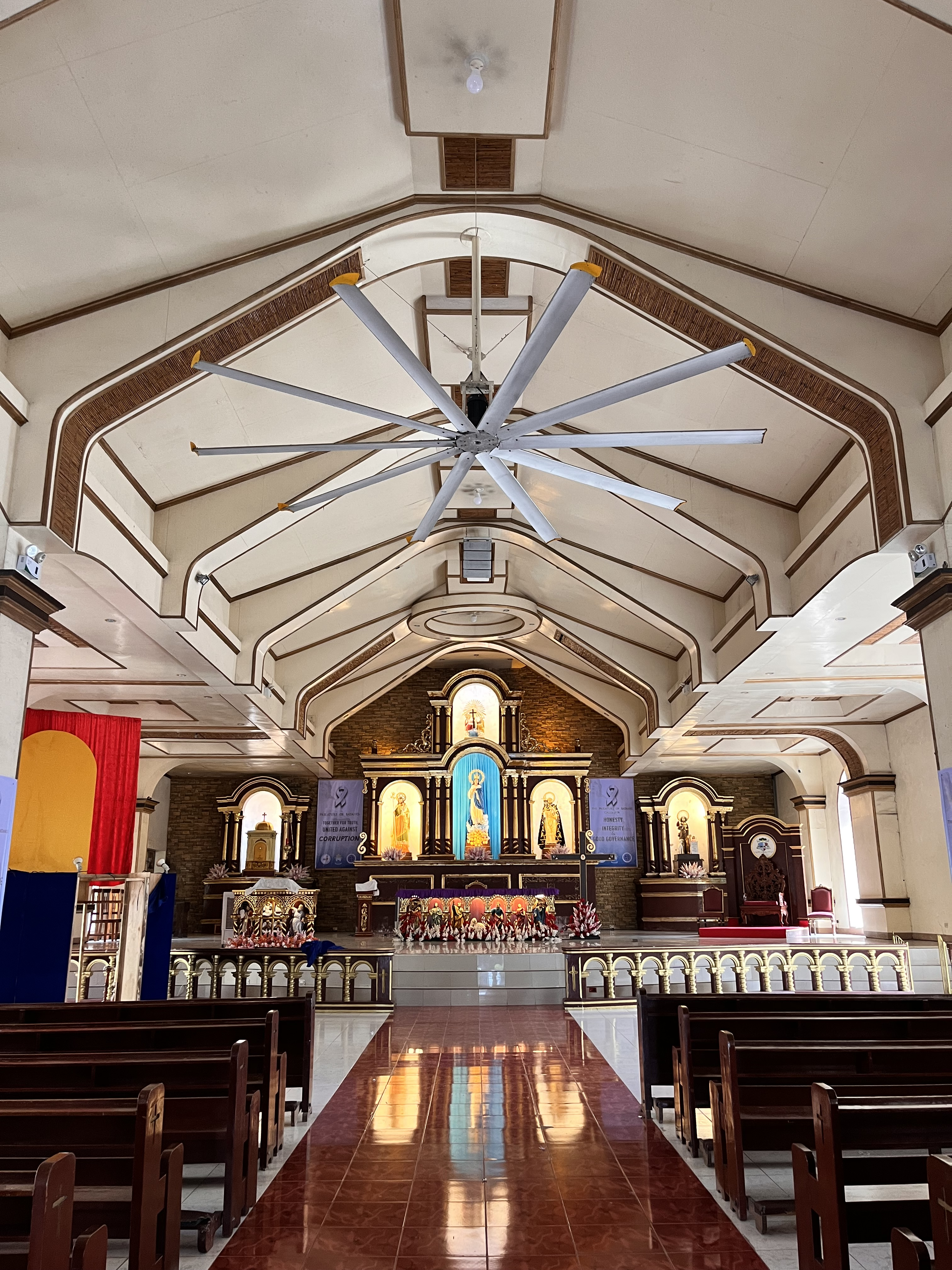
The cathedral's interior in 2025

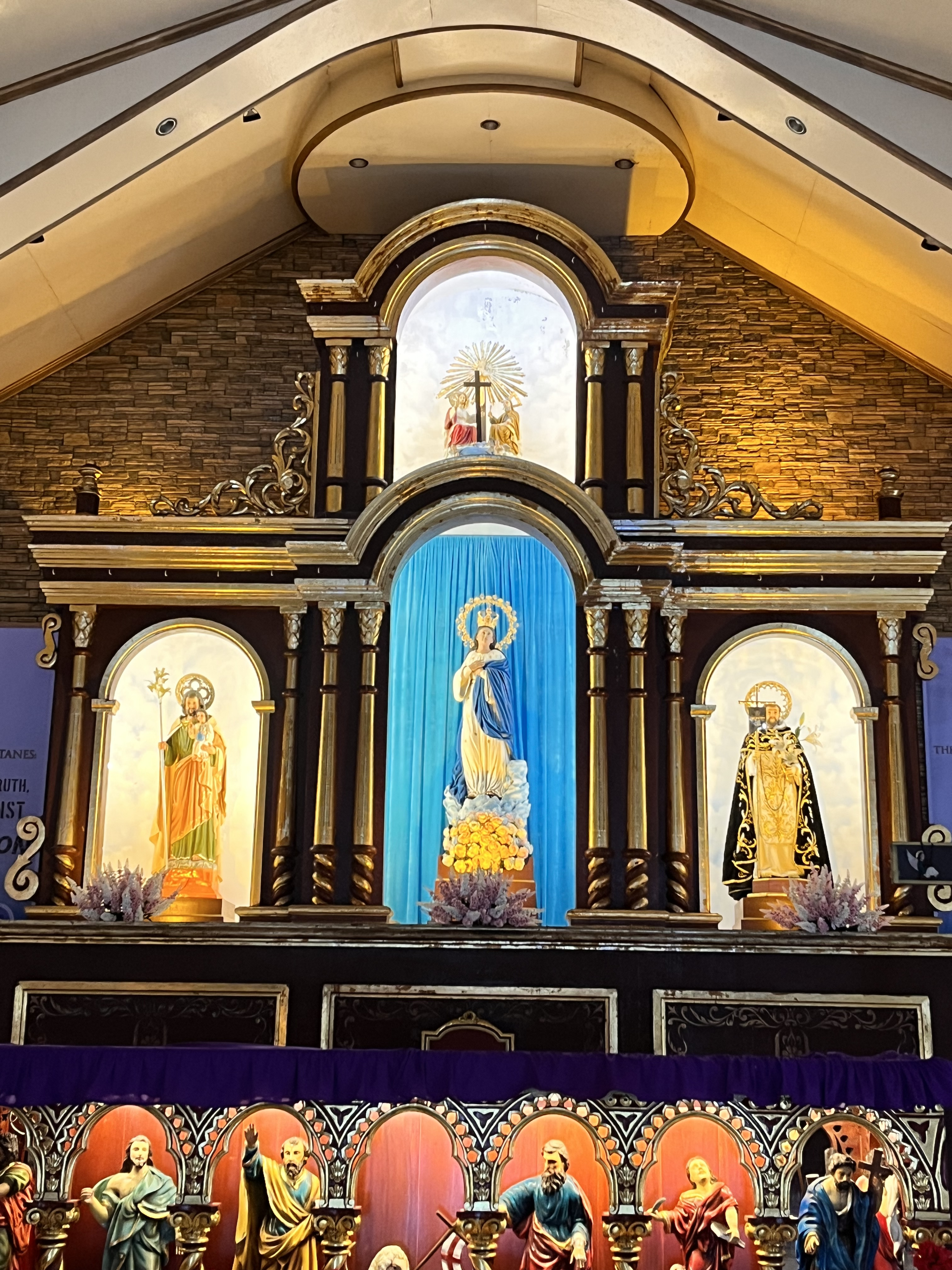
The cathedral's main retablo bearing the images of The Holy Trinity, St. Joseph, Our Lady of the Immaculate Conception of Batanes, and St. Dominic de Guzman.

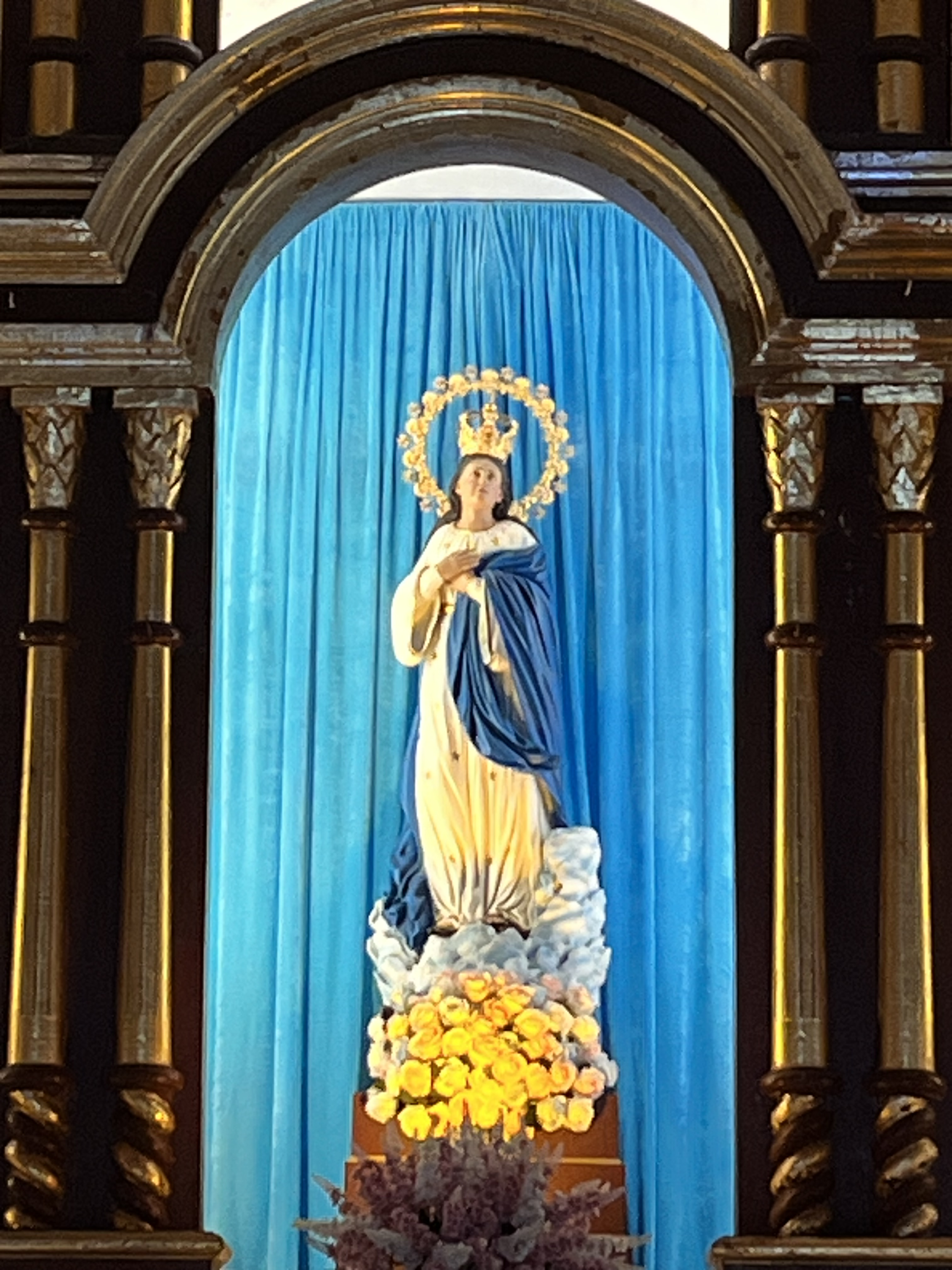
The Our Lady of the Immaculate Conception of Batanes perched on the cathedral's main retablo

Façade
