= Batanes State College =

Public college in Batanes, Philippines

- Dalubhasaang Pampamahalaan ng Batanes (Filipino)
- Other names: BaSCo, BSC
- Former names: Batanes Polytechnic College; Batanes School of Arts and Trades (1967–1994)
- Type: Public State college Co-educational; Higher education institution
- Established: 2004
- President: Dr. Djovi Regala Durante
- Director: Director for Instruction Dr. Michel A. Cabrera, DIT
- Location: Washington Street, Brgy San Antonio, Basco, Batanes, Philippines; 20°27′04″N 121°58′07″E
- Website: www.bscbatanes.edu.ph
- Location in Batanes Location in Luzon Location in the Philippines

Batanes State College (Filipino: Kolehiyong Pampamahalaan ng Batanes) is a public college in Batanes, Philippines. It is mandated to provide collegiate level occupational, technological, and professional training in the fields of fishery, agriculture, environmental sciences, and other related fields of study. It is also mandated to provide special instruction for special purposes, promote research and extension services in the various disciplines and areas of specialization and provide progressive leadership in its areas of specialization. Its main campus is located in Basco, Batanes.

The courses offered within the college are agriculture, tourism and hospitality management, teacher's education, industrial and information technology, among others. The province itself is a culture hotspot and an ecological zone, however, courses regarding social studies, culture, the arts, and the biological and geological sciences have yet to be offered in the state college.
