= Mario de Leon Baltazar =

Filipino Catholic prelate (1926–2012)

- Prelate of Territorial Prelature of Batanes
- Church: Catholic Church
- In office: 1966–1995

Orders
- Ordination: 1953

Personal details
- Born: September 3, 1926
- Died: July 9, 2012 (aged 85)

Mario de Leon Baltazar (September 3, 1926 – July 9, 2012) was the Catholic prelate of the Territorial Prelature of Batanes, Philippines.

Ordained to the priesthood in 1953, Baltazar was named prelate of the Territorial Prelature of Batanes in 1966 and resigned in 1995.
