= Batanes National Science High School =

Public high school in Batanes, Philippines

Location
- Cavangan Drive, San Antonio, Basco, Batanes, 3900; Basco, Batanes 3900; Philippines; 20°27′01″N 121°58′03″E

Information
- Former names: Batanes High School (BHS), Batanes National High School (BNHS)
- School type: Public High School Public Science High School
- Motto: "Soar High, Science High!"
- Established: c. 1917
- Authority: Schools Division Office of Batanes
- School number: 300411
- Principal: Jeffrey D. Medina
- Head teacher: Joyce G. Ballon, Clarissa G. Asa, Ellen F. Gallarosa, Rossan Y. Come
- Grades: 7-12
- Enrollment: 1,112 (2022-2023)
- Average class size: 40
- Language: English, Filipino, Ivatan
- Nickname: Sci High
- Publication: BISUMI X-Press (Project OBX)

The Batanes National Science High School, formerly the Batanes National High School, is a public science high school in the Philippines, recognized by the Department of Education. It is in Basco, the provincial capital of Batanes, and had an enrollment of 1,112 students in school year 2022–2023. The current principal is Jeffrey D. Medina.

== History ==
The offering of Secondary Education was initiated by the Provincial Board of Batanes during the term of Governor Vicente Barsana. However, it was stopped when the Governor died in a shipwreck on a trip to Itbayat. Despite this, in June 1917, with Lucas Gonzalo as Governor, the Batanes High School was formally opened, having the following teachers: Eligio Llanes, Elpidio Fadri, and Francisco Asidao. The subjects taught were Mathematics, Science, English, and military science for boys.

During the first year of establishment, only 1st year level was opened, followed by the other curriculum years so that by 1928, the Batanes High School graduated its first batch of 10 students who finished the course. These were Felix Agusto, Antonio Alcantara, Fernando Baroña, and Jose Baroña, all four from Ivana; and Francsisco Elep, Custodio Villalva, Pedro Hontomin, and Cirilo Faberes who were from Sabtang and a lone female student from San Fabian Pangasinan, Concordia Erefe. The school was closed during the war but reopened in June 1945.

In 1958, the 2-2 plan curriculum was offered to its students, later followed by the Revised Education Program in 1958. Because of financial constraints in running a secondary school, Congressman Jorge Abad sponsored R.A. 4049, converting the school to a National High School, thus, successfully turning over the burden of running the Secondary School to the National Government.

This conversion paved the way for the opening of a branch school in Itbayat with Mr. Orlando E. Hontomin as Head Teacher, followed by one in Ivana in 1967 with Mrs. Severa J. Adalid as Head, then in Mahatao in 1977 with Bernardo Hornedo as Teacher-in-charge. These branch schools eventually became full-fledged high schools, with Itbayat becoming the Itbayat National Agricultural High School with Mr. Bonifacio P. Caan as first principal, the Ivana National High School with Mr. Nicanor Aguto as principal, and the Mahatao National High School with Mr. Reinfredo F. Mirabueno, principal.

All of these schools offered the Revised Secondary Education Curriculum graduating its students and managing their finances. Itbayat National High School offers an Agricultural High School Curriculum as mandated in its establishment.

On August 22, 2000, the bill sponsored by Congressman Florencio B. Abad – R.A. 8855 was finally passed by Congress and Approved by President Joseph Ejercito Estrada, formally converting the Batanes National High School into the Batanes National Science High School. It started operation as a special science high school during the school year 2001–2002.

In 2016, the Batanes National Science High School established the offering of the Senior High School, adding grade 11 for the school year 2016-2017 and grade 12 for its succeeding year under the Republic Act 10533, known as the Enhanced Basic Education Act of 2013.

From the original 3 Teachers headed by a teacher-in-charge in 1917, the school now has 70 teachers and staff headed by a Secondary School Principal as of August 2022. It offers Special Science Education Program (SSEP) and Special Program for Journalism (SPJ) in Junior High School. For Senior High School, it offers the following strands: Science, Technology, Engineering, and Mathematics (STEM); Accounting, Business, and Management (ABM); and General Academic Strand (GAS).

A historical marker was granted to this institution by the National Historical Commission of the Philippines in 2014.

Original Filipino text	Translated English text	Photograph
ITINATAG SA BASCO, BATANES UPANG MAGKAROON NG SEKONDARYANG PAARALAN SA LALAWIGAN, 1917. NAGTAPOS ANG MGA UNANG MAG-AARAL, 1928. PANSAMANTALANG ISINARA NOONG IKALAWANG DIGMAANG PANDAIGDIG, 1942–1945; MULING BINUKSAN MATAPOS ANG DIGMAAN, 1946. NAGING BATANES HIGH SCHOOL, 18 HUNYO 1964. GINAWANG BATANES NATIONAL SCIENCE HIGH SCHOOL, 22 AGOSTO 2000.	Established in Basco, Batanes to provide secondary education to the province, 1917. First batch of students graduated in 1928. Temporarily closed during the Second World War, 1942–1945; reopened after the war, 1946. Became Batanes High School, June 18, 1964. Became Batanes National High School, August 22, 2000.	

== Principals of the School ==
Name	Position	Period of service	
Eylogio Llenos (Isabela)	-	1917	1920
Marcelo Aglipay (Laoag)	-	1920	1922
Juan Agpalsa (Laoag)	-	1922	1924
Antonio Ascano (Isabela)	-	1924	1927
Elias Caray (Batangas)	-	1927	1930
Pio Montenegro (Cavite)	-	1930	1935
Pablo Pugaban (Cagayan)	-	1935	1944
Pedro Aguada (Cagayan)	-	1944	1950
Adriano Agagan	-	1950	1961
Rucela B. Acacio	-	1961	1974
Severa J. Adalid	-	1974	1980
Orlando E. Hontomin	School Principal I	1980	2001
Lilia G. Hornedo	Head Teacher III	January 28, 2001	February 28, 2001
Reinfredo F. Mirabueno	School Principal II	March 1, 2001	September 18, 2005
Jaime G. Castillo	OIC - Office of the School Principal	September 19, 2005	September 19, 2006
Florante E. Vergara	School Principal II	December 20, 2006	March 17, 2008
Juan E. Redondo	School Principal II	March 18, 2008	August 19, 2013
Rolan E. Cadiz	School Principal II	August 20, 2013	December 31, 2014
Evangeline D. Castillo	HT III / Teacher - In - Charge	January 5, 2015	April 14, 2015
Alfredo C. Tabuso	School Principal II	April 15, 2015	June 3, 2018
Cecilia C. Cielo	School Principal I	June 4, 2018	September 8, 2019
Alfredo C. Tabuso	School Principal II	September 9, 2019	July 30, 2021
Carmen C. Noguera	School Principal I	August 2, 2021	August 18, 2024
Jeffrey D. Medina	School Principal I	August 19, 2024	Present

== The school logo ==
The original logo of the school was designed by Jimmy D. Verana, a former Master Teacher II of the school. It was later re-designed by Kym Clyde H. Moro, the current Head Teacher I of the school in June 2019.

== Enrollment data of the school ==
The learner information system reveals the following student enrollee from school year 2018 - 2019 up to present.

Total student population of the school through the years
School Year	Male	Female	Total
2018 - 2019	575	580	1,155
2019 - 2020	585	581	1,166
2020 - 2021	590	529	1119
2021 - 2022	581	535	1116
2022 - 2023	574	528	1,112
