= Territorial Prelature of Batanes =

Catholic territory in the Philippines

Territorial Prelature of Batanes Praelatura Territorialis Batanensis Prelatura Teritoryal ng Batanes Prelatura Territorial de Batanes

Catholic
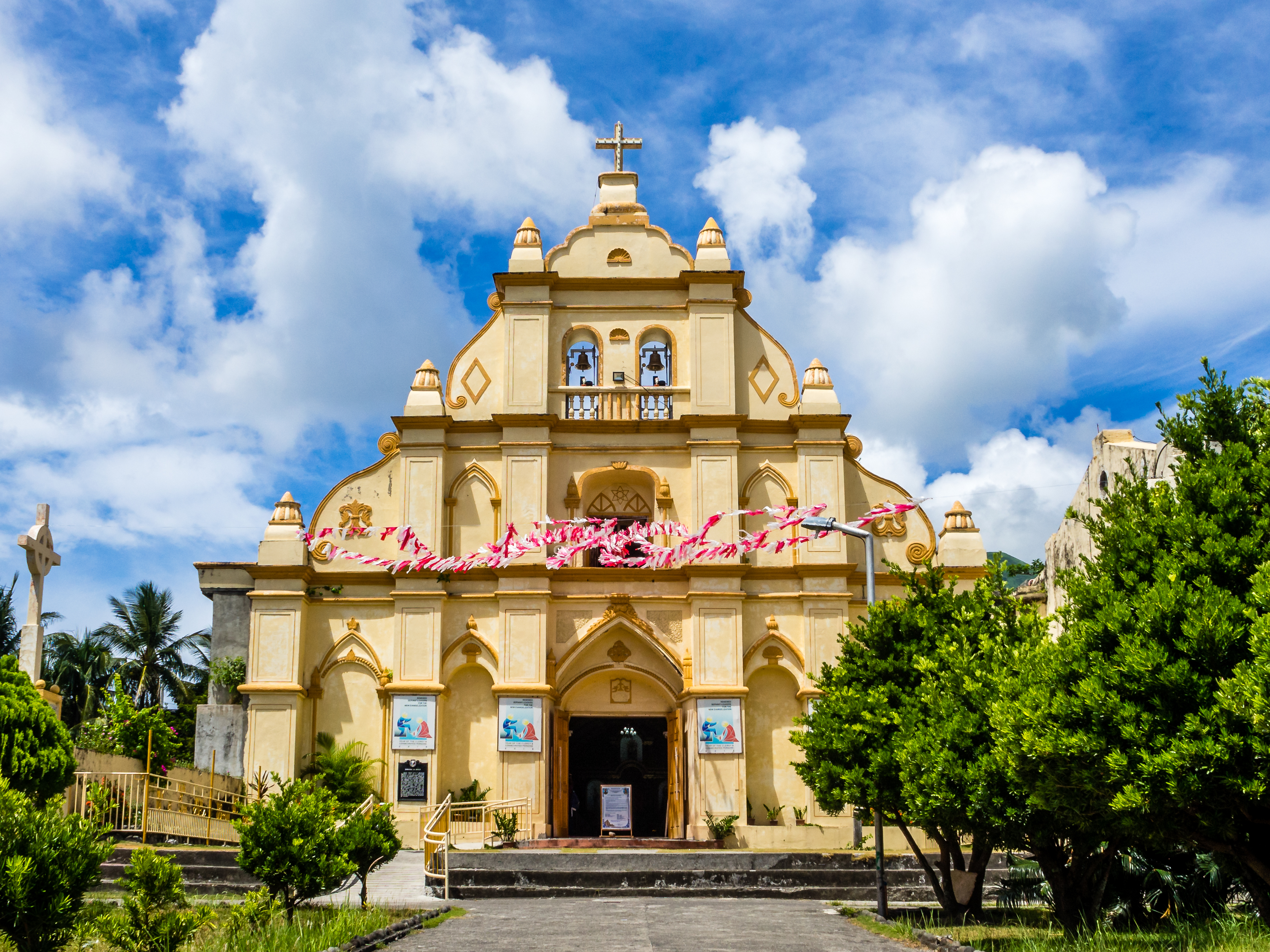
- Basco Cathedral

- Coat of arms

Location
- Country: Philippines
- Territory: Batanes
- Metropolitan: Tuguegarao
- Coordinates: 20°27′03″N 121°58′10″E

Statistics
- Area: 784 km^{2} (303 sq mi)
- Population: Total; Catholics: (as of 2021); 18,867; 17,795 (94.3%)

Information
- Denomination: Catholic Church
- Sui iuris church: Latin Church
- Rite: Roman Rite
- Cathedral: Cathedral of Our Lady of the Immaculate Conception

Current leadership
- Pope: Leo XIV
- Prelate: Danilo B. Ulep
- Metropolitan Archbishop: Ricardo L. Baccay

The Territorial Prelature of Batanes (in Latin: Praelatura Territorialis Batanensis) is a Latin Church pre-diocesan, non-missionary jurisdiction of the Catholic Church in the Philippines. It is a suffragan in the ecclesiastical province of the Archdiocese of Tuguegarao on Luzon island in the Philippines.

The Our Lady of the Immaculate Conception Cathedral is the episcopal seat of the territorial prelate, in Basco, Batanes. The current bishop-prelate is Danilo B. Ulep.

== History ==
The prelature was erected on 30 November 1950 as Territorial Prelature of Batanes Islands and Babuyan / Batanen(sis) et Babuyanen(sis) (Latin), on territory split off from the Metropolitan Archdiocese of Manila. On 29 June 1951 it became part of the ecclesiastical province of Archdiocese of Nueva Segovia. It became suffragan of the Archdiocese of Tuguegarao, its mother see, on 21 September 1974. On 6 February 2002, it was renamed Territorial Prelature of Batanes / Batanen(sis) (Latin adjective).

== Coat of arms ==
The silver crescent symbolizes the Immaculate Conception, the titular of the principal church in the prelature. The North Star together with the constellation of the Ursa Major denotes that the prelature covers the northern-most part of the Philippines. Cattle is the most important export product of Batanes and Babuyan Islands hence the bull on pasture. The agitated sea symbolizes the dangerous waters between these islands.

== Episcopal ordinaries ==
Prelates of Batanes and the Babuyan Islands

Ordinary		Period in office	Coat of arms
1.	Peregrin de la Fuente Nestar	2 July 1951 appointed – 14 May 1966 death	
2.	Mario de Leon Baltazar	18 Nov 1966 appointed – 1995 resigned	

Prelates of Batanes

Bishop-prelates		Period in office	Coat of arms
1.	Jose Paala Salazar	25 Apr 1996 appointed – 23 Nov 2002	
2.	Camilo Diaz Gregorio	13 Sept 2003 appointed – 20 May 2017 retired	
3.	Danilo B. Ulep	20 May 2017 appointed – present	

== See also ==
- Catholic Church in the Philippines
- List of Catholic dioceses in the Philippines

== Sources and external links ==
- GCatholic.org
- Catholic Hierarchy
- Prelature website
