= Mount Iraya =

Dormant stratovolcano on Batan Island, Philippines

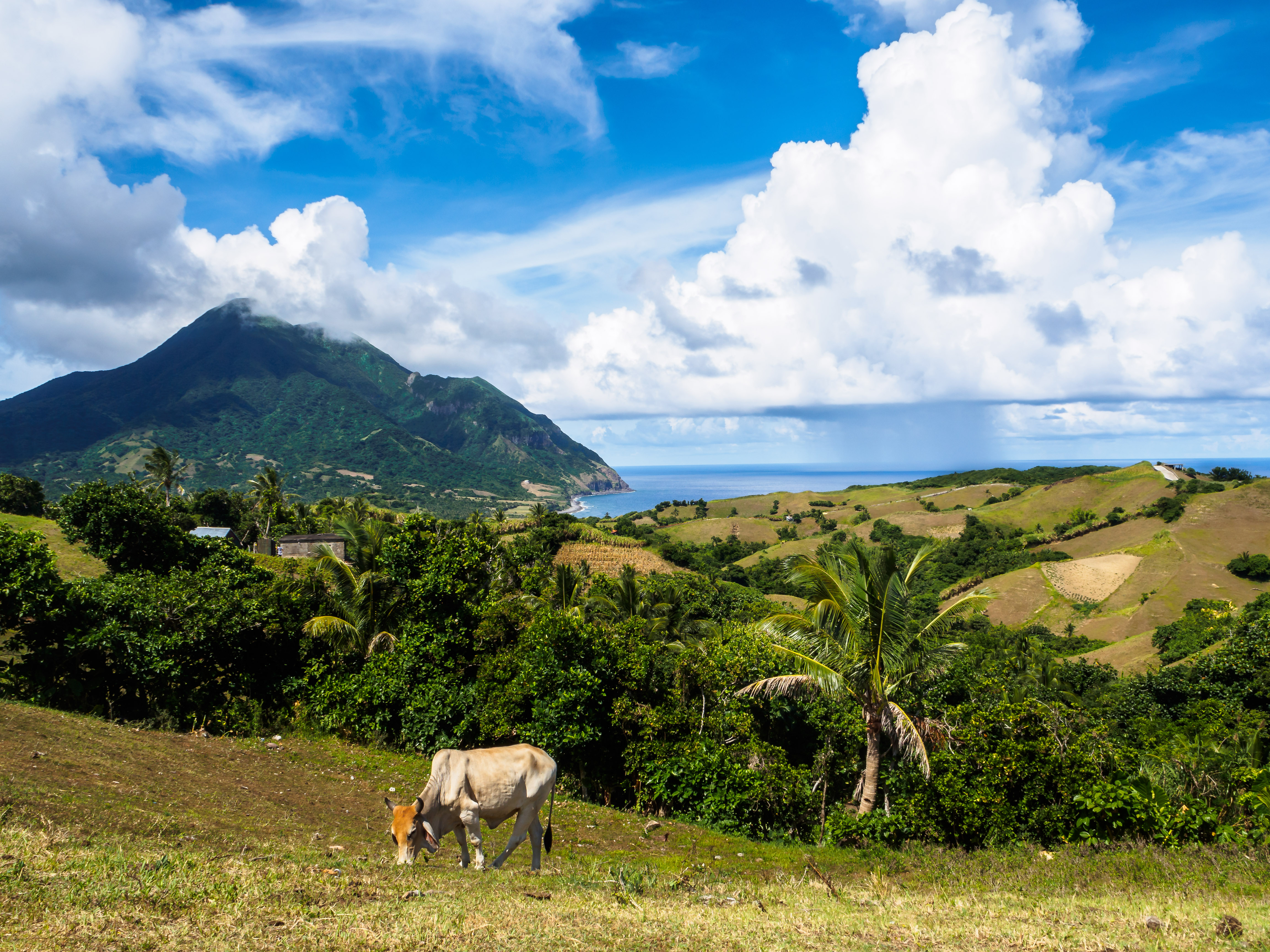
- The mountain as seen from Tukon Church

Highest point
- Elevation: 1,009 m (3,310 ft)
- Prominence: 1,009 m (3,310 ft)
- Listing: Active volcano in the Philippines; Ribu
- Coordinates: 20°27′59″N 122°00′42″E

Geography
- Location within Batanes Location within Luzon Location within Philippines
- Country: Philippines
- Region: Cagayan Valley
- Province: Batanes

Geology
- Mountain type: Stratovolcano
- Volcanic arc: Luzon Volcanic Arc
- Last eruption: 1454

Mount Iraya, is an active stratovolcano on Batan Island, and is the highest point in the province of Batanes, Philippines. It is adjacent to another volcanic edifice, Mount Matarem.

== Location ==
Iraya is located on Batan Island, one of the islands in the province of Batanes, in the Luzon Strait, north of the island of Luzon, in the Philippines.

It is the northernmost active volcano in the Philippines.

== Physical features ==
Iraya is a heavily forested stratovolcano, with an elevation of 1,009 metres (3,310 ft) asl, and a base diameter of 5,500 metres (18,000 ft).

== Volcanic activity ==
While Mount Iraya last erupted in 1454, the Philippine Institute of Volcanology and Seismology (PHIVOLCS) still considers it as one of the active volcanoes in the Philippines.

In 1998, volcanologists recorded seismic swarms which led them to form a monitoring network on Batan Island for several months. After the swarms of tremors had diminished, the temporary stations in Barangay San Joaquin in Basco, Batanes and another near the crater, were pulled out. Seismicity or any activity relating to Iraya is still monitored by the Basco Seismological Station.

Volcanoes of the Philippines are all part of the Pacific ring of fire.

== Mythology ==
Mount Iraya is a sacred mountain for the Ivatan people. There are two contrasting tales regarding the mountain. The first tale states that the mountain is a mother looking over her children - the Ivatans - to ensure their protection. On the other hand, the second tale states that if a ring of clouds appear on top of the mountain, Iraya is notifying the people for preparation due to an inevitable death of an elder, usually due to natural causes.

== See also ==
- List of volcanoes in the Philippines
  - List of active volcanoes in the Philippines
  - List of potentially active volcanoes in the Philippines
  - List of inactive volcanoes in the Philippines
- Philippine Institute of Volcanology and Seismology
