= Jose Paala Salazar =

Filipino clergyman

Most Reverend Jose P. Salazar OP
- Auxiliary Bishop of Lipa
- Diocese: Lipa
- See: Lipa
- Predecessor: Buenaventura M. Famadico
- Previous posts: Prelate of Batanes and Babuyan Islands (1996–2002); Titular Bishop of Hippo Diarrhytus (2002–2004)

Orders
- Ordination: 9 May 1968
- Consecration: 7 June 1996 by Cardinal Jaime Sin

Personal details
- Born: Jose Paala Salazar; March 13, 1937 Manila, Commonwealth of the Philippines
- Died: May 30, 2004 (aged 67) Lipa, Batangas, Philippines
- Denomination: Roman Catholic

The Most Reverend Jose Paala Salazar OP (March 13, 1937 – May 30, 2004) was a Filipino prelate of the Roman Catholic Church.

== Biography ==
Salazar, born in Manila, Philippines, was ordained a priest on May 9, 1968, and consecrated bishop on April 25, 1996. Salazar was appointed Auxiliary Bishop of the Archdiocese of Lipa on June 11, 2003. He was the Titular Bishop of Hippo Diarrhytus.

On November 11, 2002, Salazar was one of 15 people to survive the crash of Laoag International Airlines Flight 585.

He died aged 67 in Lipa, Batangas.

Catholic Church titles
Preceded by Tadeusz Kondrusiewicz	Titular Bishop of Hippo Diarrhytus; 2002–2004	Succeeded by Manfred Grothe
