= Basco, Batanes =

Capital of Batanes, Philippines

Basco
- Municipality
- Municipality of Basco
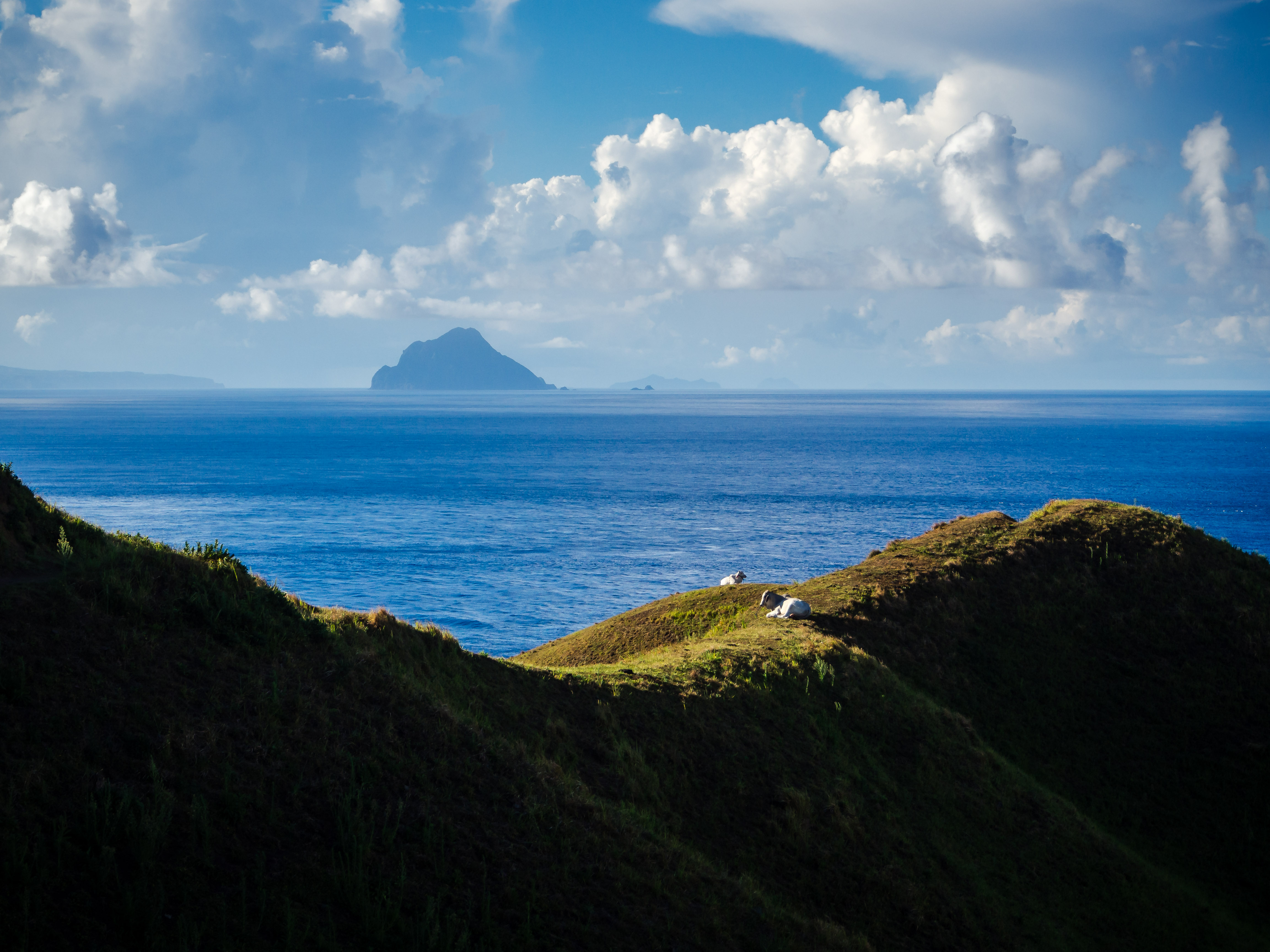
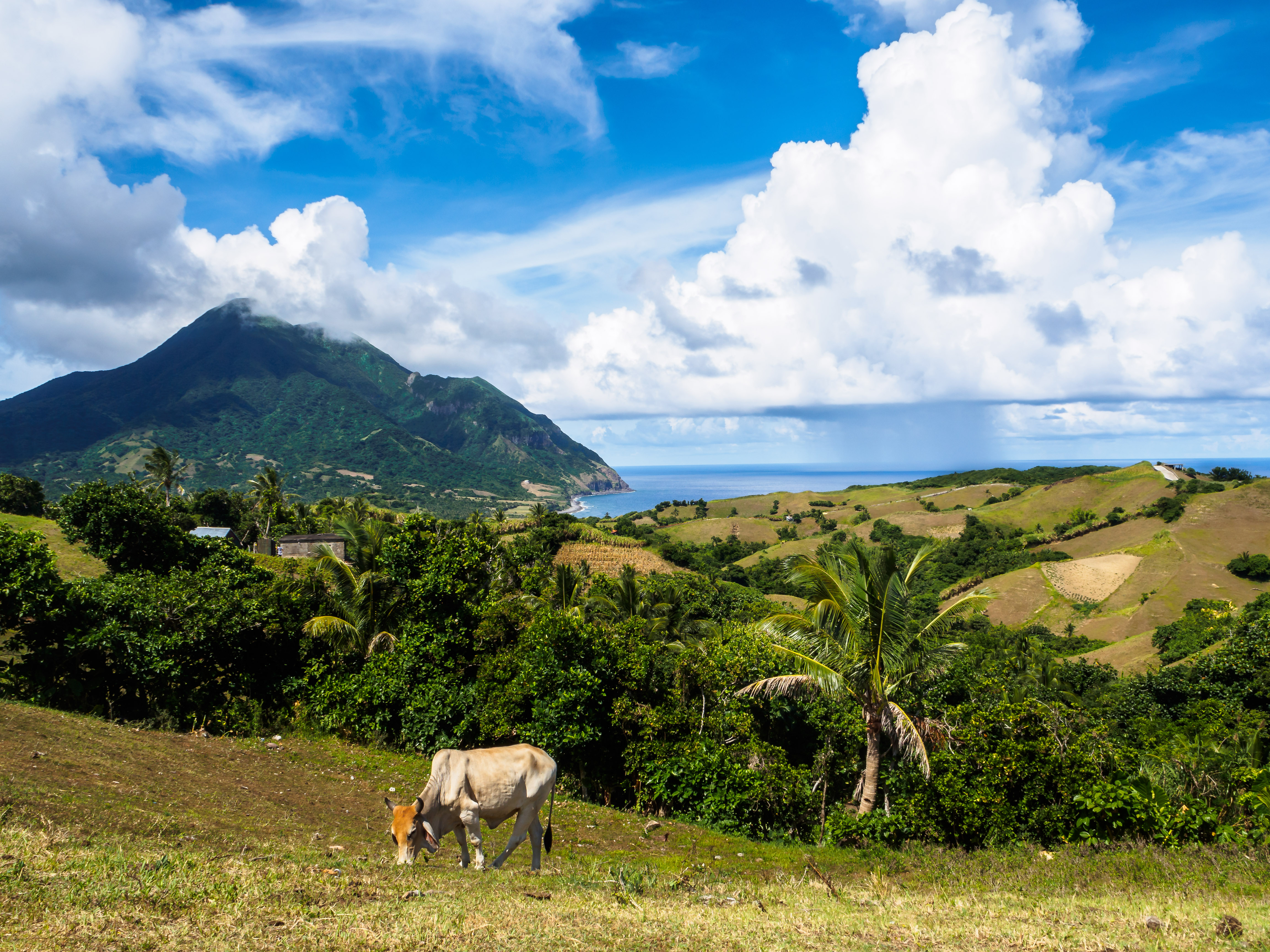
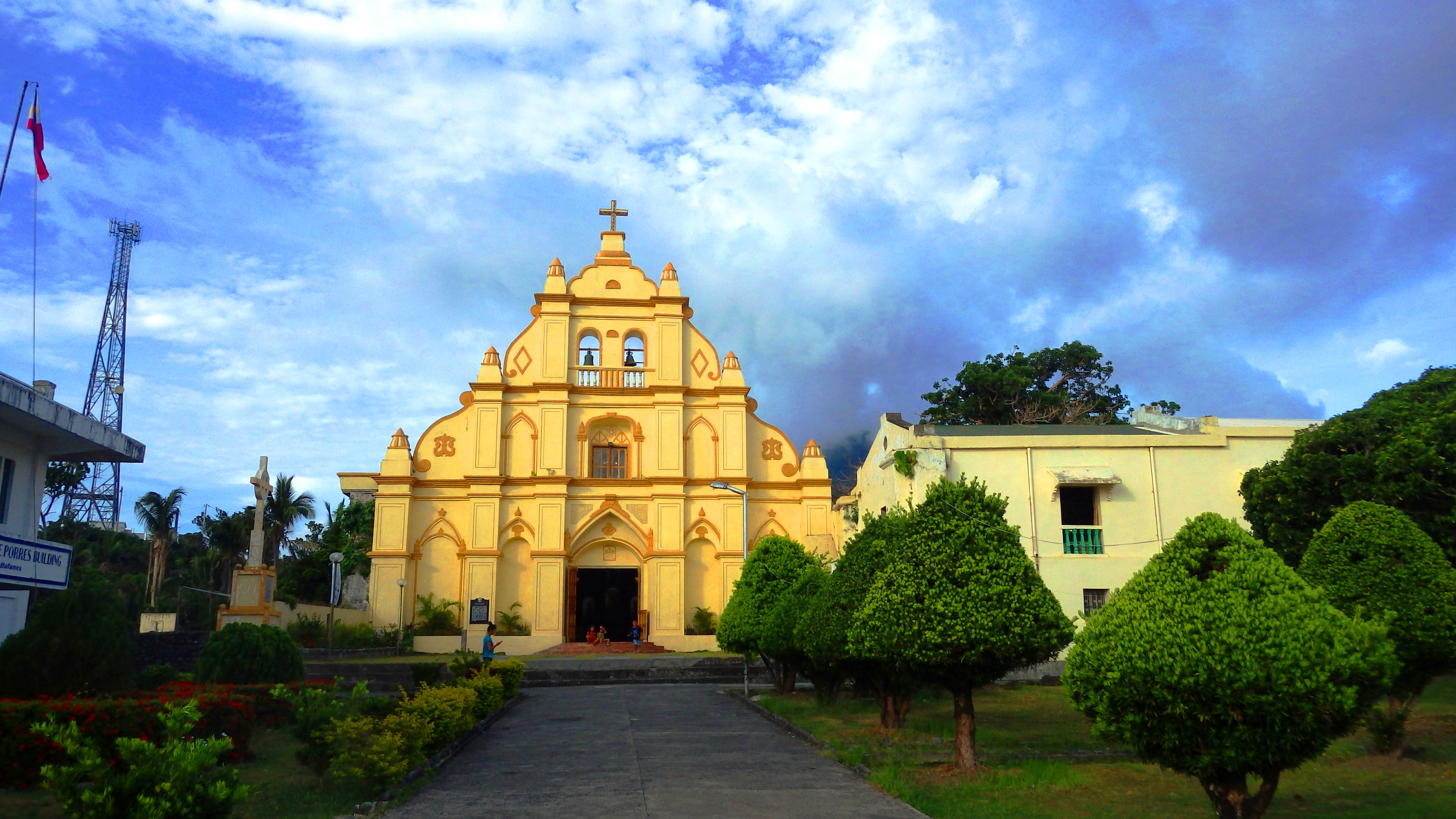
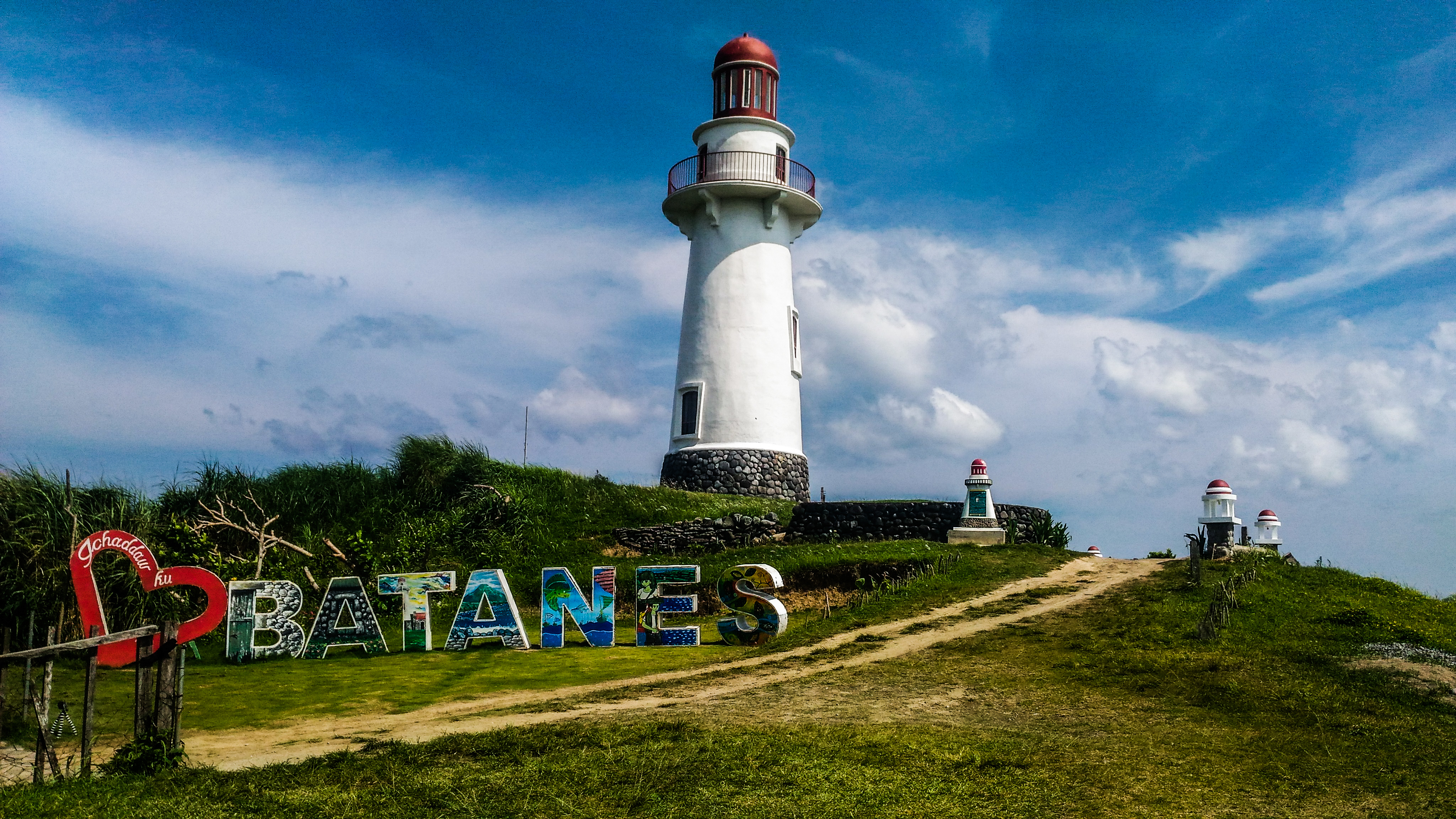
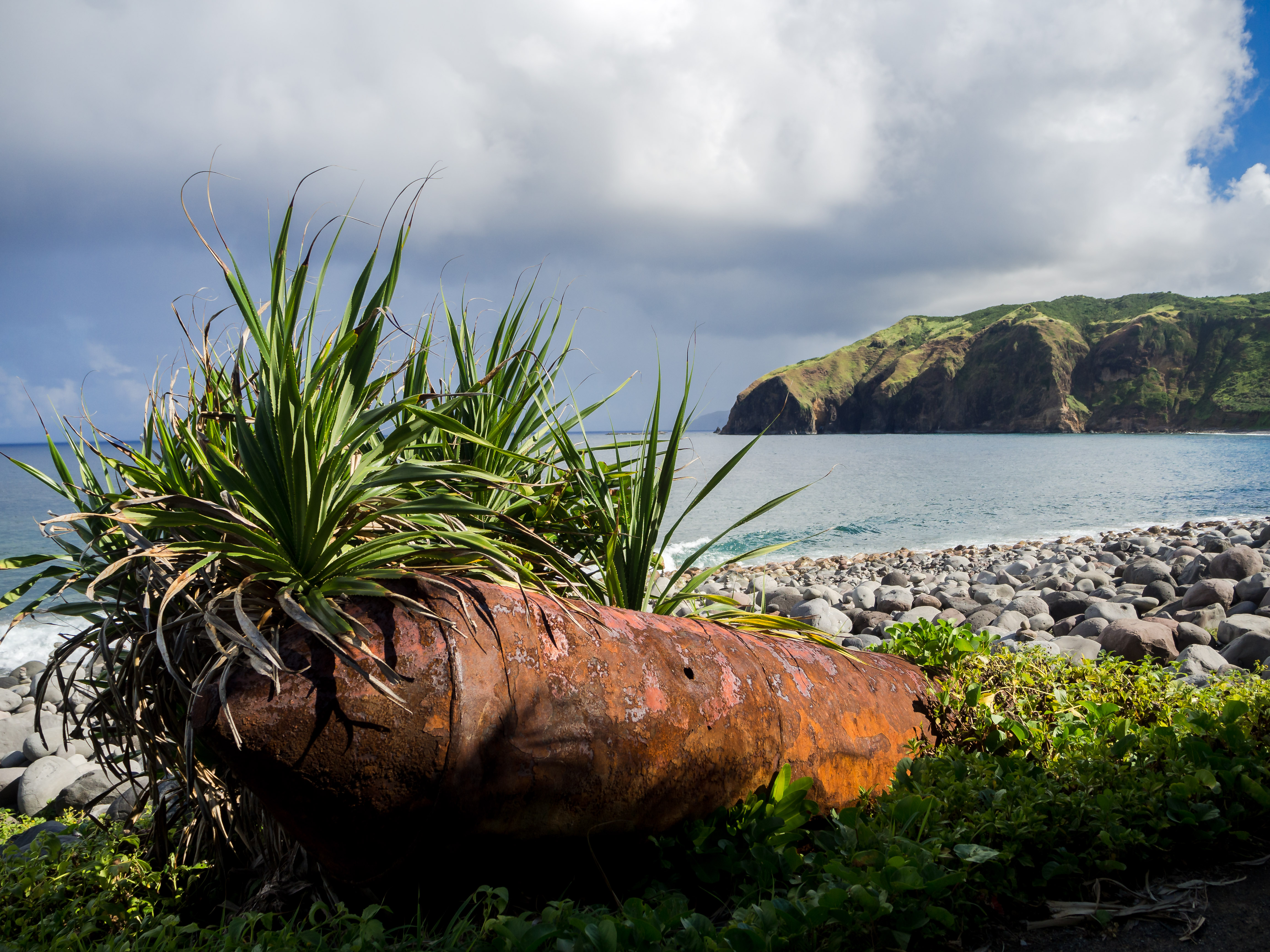
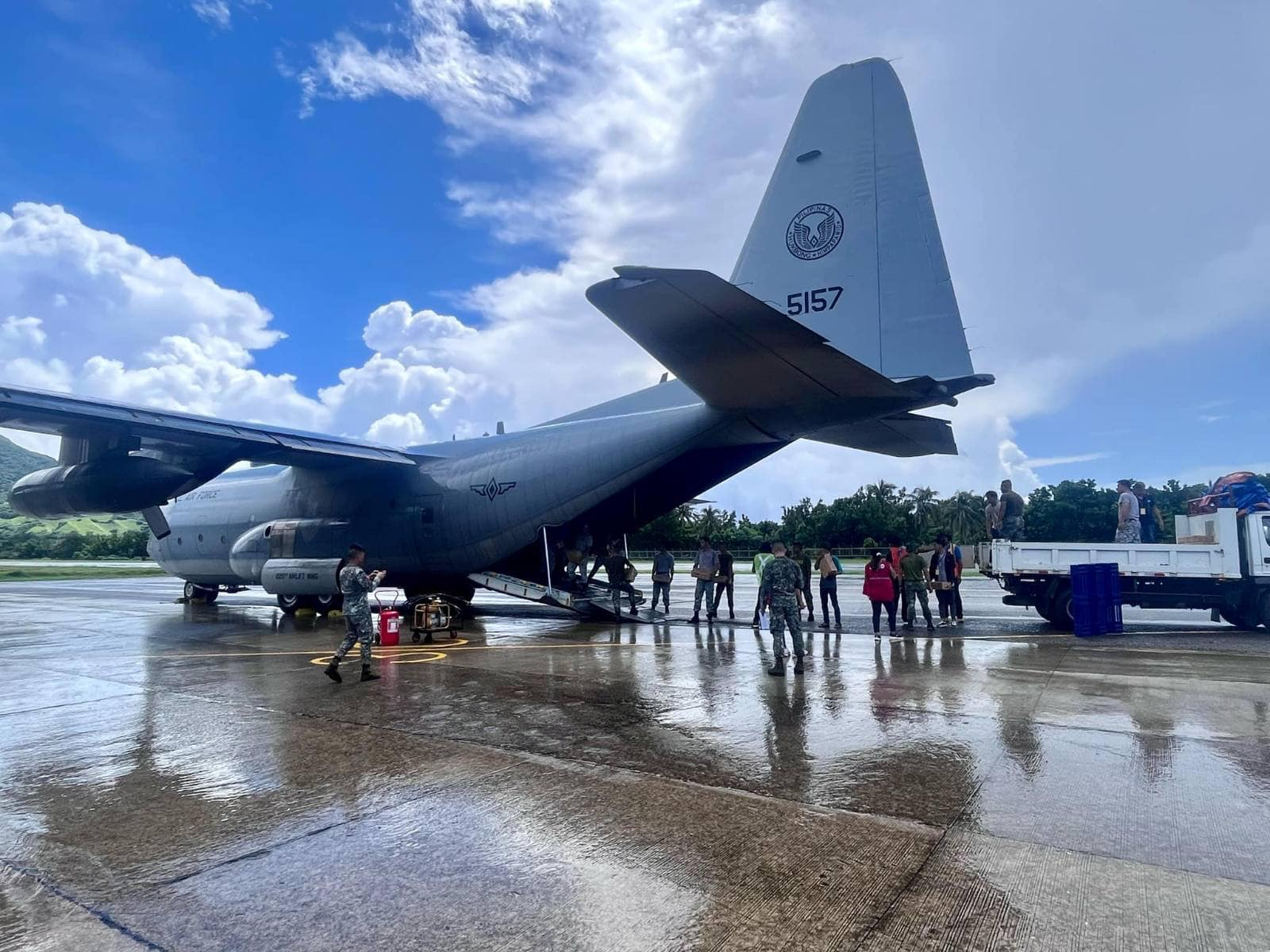
- From the top, left to right: Vayang Rolling Hills, Mount Iraya, Basco Cathedral, Basco Lighthouse, Valugan Beach, and Basco Airport

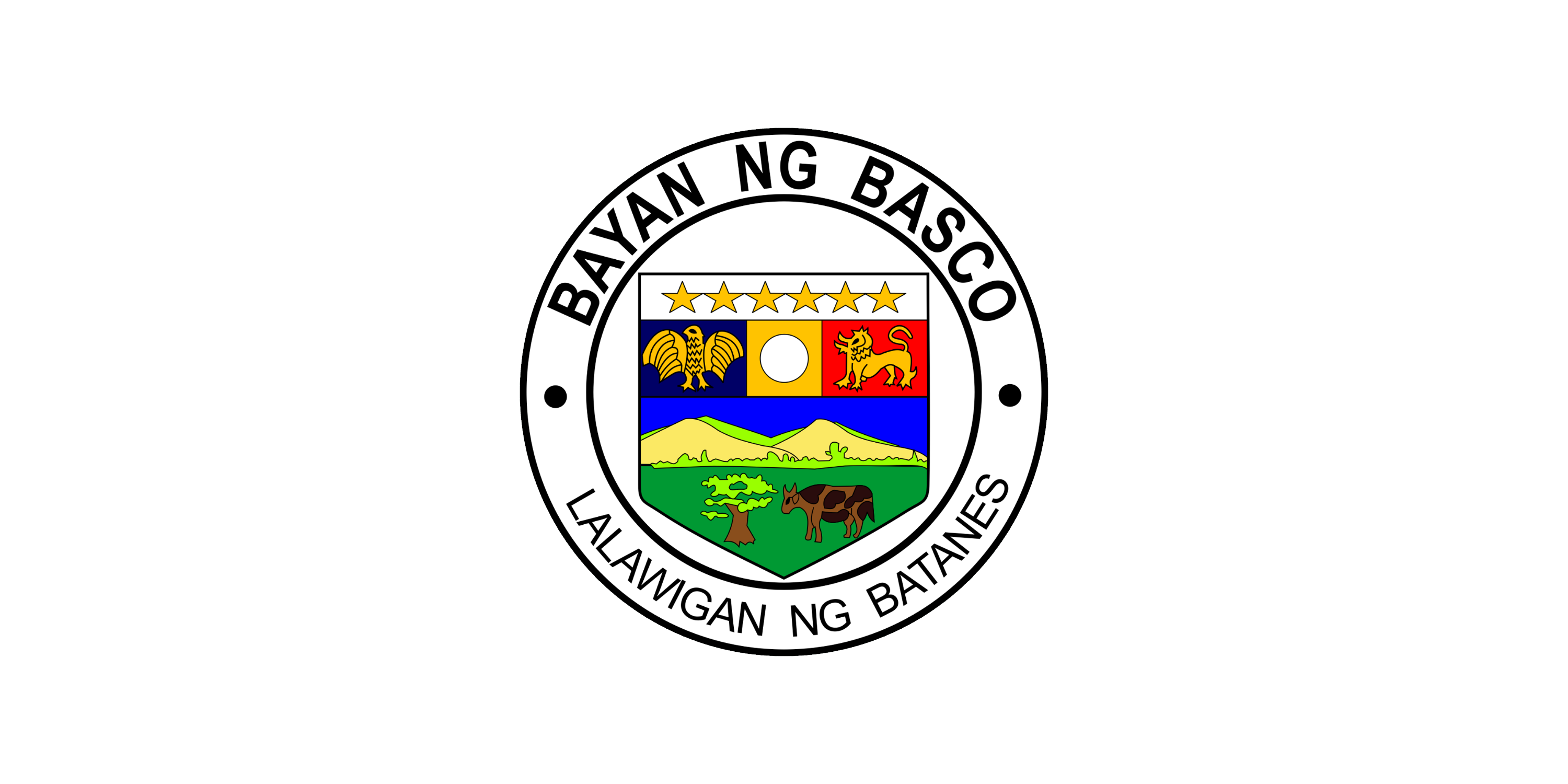
- Flag Seal

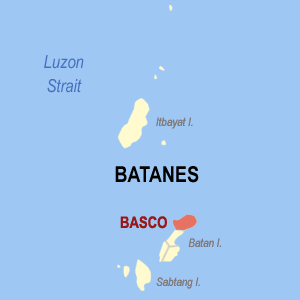
- Map of Batanes with Basco highlighted
- Interactive map of Basco
- Location in the Philippines Basco (Luzon) Basco (Batanes)
- Coordinates: 20°27′N 121°58′E
- Country: Philippines
- Region: Cagayan Valley
- Province: Batanes
- District: Lone district
- Named for: José Basco y Vargas
- Barangays: 6 (see Barangays)

Government
  - Type: Sangguniang Bayan
  - Mayor: German A. Caccam
  - Vice Mayor: Will Lee H. Gabotero
  - Representative: Ciriaco Gato Jr.
  - Municipal Council: Members: Franklin Z. Redondo; Jacklord N. Labrador; Carla A. Cordel; Paking Castillo; Eulalia Gordo; Teresita Vinalay; John Paul Castillo; Aren Joseph C. Veracruz
  - Electorate: 6,170 voters (2025)

Area
  - Total: 49.46 km^{2} (19.10 sq mi)
- Elevation: 23.4 m (77 ft)
- Highest elevation: 1,013 m (3,323 ft)
- Lowest elevation: 0 m (0 ft)

Population (2024 census)
  - Total: 9,647
  - Density: 195.0/km^{2} (505.2/sq mi)
  - Households: 2,823

Economy
  - Income class: 4th municipal income class
  - Poverty incidence: 4.03% (2023)
  - Revenue: ₱ 61.82 million (2024)
  - Assets: ₱ 152.3 million (2024)
  - Expenditure: ₱ 63.82 million (2024)
  - Liabilities: ₱ 55.08 million (2024)

Service provider
  - Electricity: Batanes Electric Cooperative (BATANELCO)
- Time zone: UTC+8 (PST)
- ZIP code: 3900
- PSGC: 0200901000
- IDD : area code: +63 (0)78
- Native languages: Ivatan; Tagalog; Ilocano

Basco, officially the Municipality of Basco (Note: Ivatan: Kavahayan nu Basco; Ilocano: Ili ti Basco; Tagalog: Bayan ng Basco), is a municipality and capital of the province of Batanes, Philippines. According to the 2024 census, it has a population of 9,647 people.

The town is the most populous town in Batanes and is located on Batan Island, the second largest among the Batanes Islands, the northernmost group of islands of the Philippines. The town has an airport, Basco Airport, that serves domestic flights from Manila, Tuguegarao, and Itbayat. Despite its proximity to East Asian cities, there are no international flights.

Landmarks of the municipality include the Basco Lighthouse and the Basco Cathedral.

== Etymology ==
The town is named after Capitán General José Basco, who led the pacification and conquest of the islands during his term as governor-general.

== Geography ==
The municipality has a land area of 49.46 square kilometres (19.10 sq mi) constituting 22.58% of the 219.01-square-kilometre- (84.56 sq mi) total area of Batanes.

=== Barangays ===
Political map of Basco, Batanes

Basco is politically subdivided into 6 barangays. Each barangay consists of puroks and some have sitios.

PSGC	Barangay	Population			±% p.a.	
		2024		2010		
020901005	Chanarian	4.5%	430	360	▴	1.24%
020901001	Ihubok II (Kayvaluganan)	18.4%	1,779	2,344	▾	−1.89%
020901002	Ihubok I (Kaychanarianan)	28.3%	2,728	1,822	▴	2.83%
020901006	Kayhuvokan	19.9%	1,917	1,700	▴	0.83%
020901003	San Antonio	23.5%	2,264	1,969	▴	0.97%
020901004	San Joaquin	5.5%	529	384	▴	2.24%
	Total		9,647	7,907	▴	1.38%

Basco townscape with Mount Iraya in the background

The sitio of Diptan was converted into a barrio, known as San Antonio, in 1955. Also in the same year, the sitios of Coral, Hago, Tuva, Diojango, Canalaan, Honaan and Dimnalamay were amalgamated into the barrio of San Joaquin.

=== Climate ===
Basco has a tropical monsoon climate (Köppen climate classification Am). Compared to cities such as Laoag or Manila, it has a slightly cooler temperatures especially during the winter months due to its northerly location. Unlike these two cities whose hottest months are April and May, Basco has its warmest temperature during the months of June and July, similar to Taiwan.

Climate data for Basco, Philippines (2001–2020, extremes 1903–2020)
Month	Jan	Feb	Mar	Apr	May	Jun	Jul	Aug	Sep	Oct	Nov	Dec	Year
Record high °C (°F)	31.8 (89.2)	32.6 (90.7)	34.8 (94.6)	35.5 (95.9)	36.4 (97.5)	36.5 (97.7)	37.6 (99.7)	37.2 (99.0)	36.1 (97.0)	35.9 (96.6)	32.9 (91.2)	32.8 (91.0)	37.6 (99.7)
Mean daily maximum °C (°F)	24.1 (75.4)	24.8 (76.6)	26.0 (78.8)	28.1 (82.6)	29.8 (85.6)	30.4 (86.7)	30.4 (86.7)	30.0 (86.0)	29.5 (85.1)	28.3 (82.9)	26.9 (80.4)	24.7 (76.5)	27.7 (81.9)
Daily mean °C (°F)	21.3 (70.3)	21.9 (71.4)	23.0 (73.4)	25.1 (77.2)	26.8 (80.2)	27.5 (81.5)	27.5 (81.5)	27.2 (81.0)	26.7 (80.1)	25.5 (77.9)	24.2 (75.6)	21.9 (71.4)	24.9 (76.8)
Mean daily minimum °C (°F)	18.5 (65.3)	19.1 (66.4)	20.0 (68.0)	22.1 (71.8)	23.8 (74.8)	24.7 (76.5)	24.6 (76.3)	24.4 (75.9)	23.8 (74.8)	22.6 (72.7)	21.4 (70.5)	19.1 (66.4)	22.0 (71.6)
Record low °C (°F)	11.4 (52.5)	11.6 (52.9)	12.6 (54.7)	15.5 (59.9)	17.2 (63.0)	19.0 (66.2)	13.4 (56.1)	15.0 (59.0)	16.0 (60.8)	16.0 (60.8)	14.0 (57.2)	11.5 (52.7)	11.4 (52.5)
Average rainfall mm (inches)	146.0 (5.75)	91.1 (3.59)	55.1 (2.17)	56.4 (2.22)	215.0 (8.46)	183.4 (7.22)	230.5 (9.07)	321.1 (12.64)	343.3 (13.52)	260.7 (10.26)	268.6 (10.57)	158.0 (6.22)	2,329.2 (91.70)
Average rainy days (≥ 1.0 mm)	15	9	7	5	11	12	13	16	17	14	16	15	150
Average relative humidity (%)	80	82	82	84	85	85	85	86	86	83	84	82	84
Source: PAGASA

== Demographics ==
Population census of Basco

Year	Pop.	±% p.a.
1903	2,347	—
1918	2,338	−0.03%
1939	2,782	+0.83%
1948	3,312	+1.96%
1960	2,868	−1.19%
1970	3,757	+2.73%
1975	3,984	+1.18%
1980	4,341	+1.73%

Year	Pop.	±% p.a.
1990	5,729	+2.81%
1995	5,772	+0.14%
2000	6,717	+3.30%
2007	7,517	+1.56%
2010	7,907	+1.86%
2015	8,579	+1.57%
2020	9,517	+2.21%
2024	9,647	+0.33%

Source: Philippine Statistics Authority

In the 2024 census, Basco had a population of 9,647 people. The population density was 200 inhabitants per square kilometre (520/sq mi).

== Economy ==
Poverty incidence of Basco (%)

Source: Philippine Statistics Authority

== Government ==
=== Local government ===
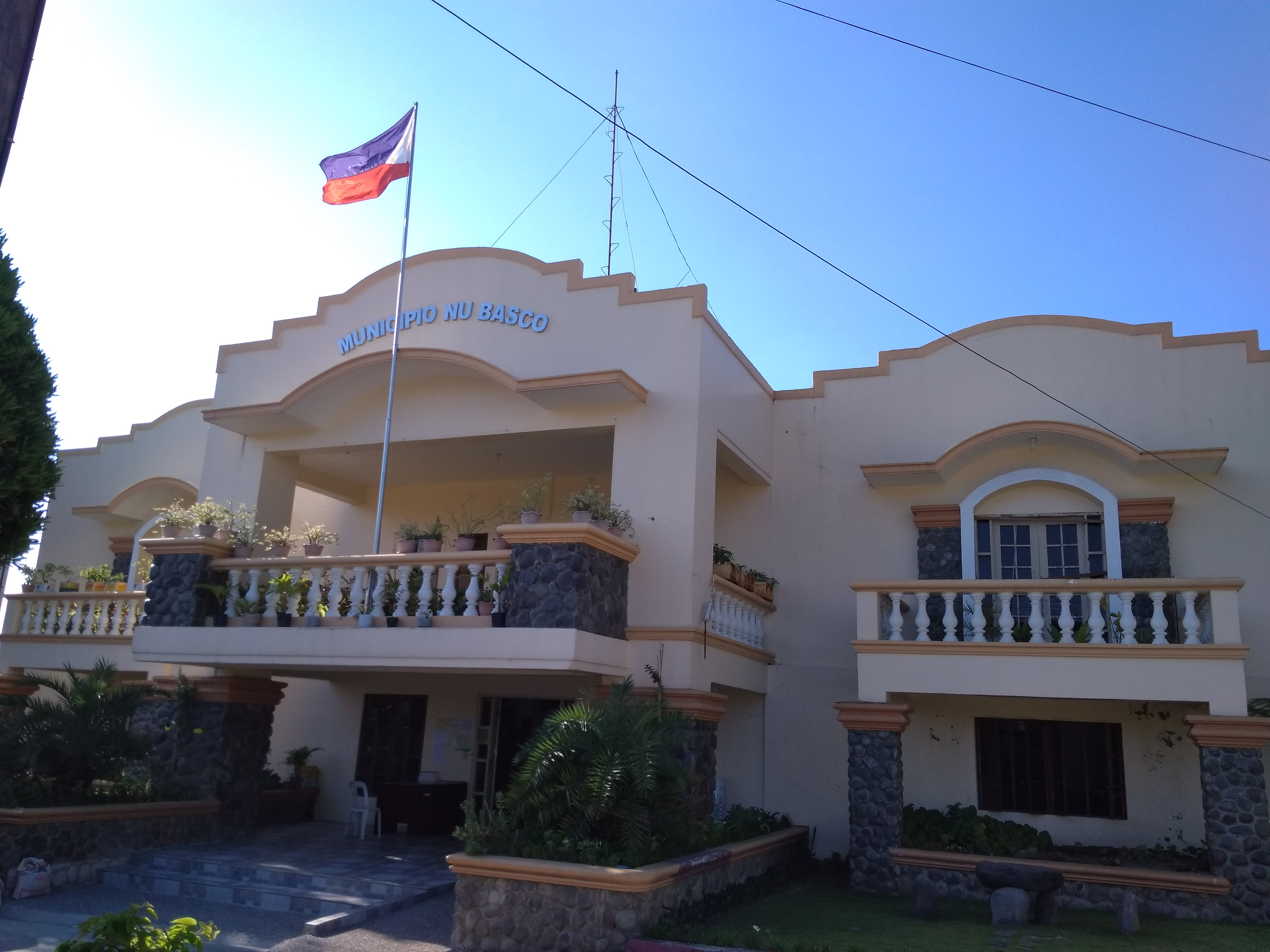
Basco Municipal Hall

Basco is part of the lone congressional district of the province of Batanes. It is governed by a mayor, designated as its local chief executive, and by a municipal council as its legislative body in accordance with the Local Government Code. The mayor, vice mayor, and the councilors are elected directly by the people through an election which is being held every three years.

=== Elected officials ===
Members of the Municipal Council (2025–2028)
Position	Name
Congressman	Ciriaco Gato Jr.
Mayor	Milo Caccam
Vice-Mayor	Cholo Gabotero
Councilors	Ankie Redondo
Councilors	Jacklord N. Labrador
Councilors	Carla A. Cordel
Councilors	Paking Castillo
Councilors	Eulalia Gordon
Councilors	Teresita Vinalay
Councilors	John Paul Castillo
Councilors	Aren Joseph C. Veracruz

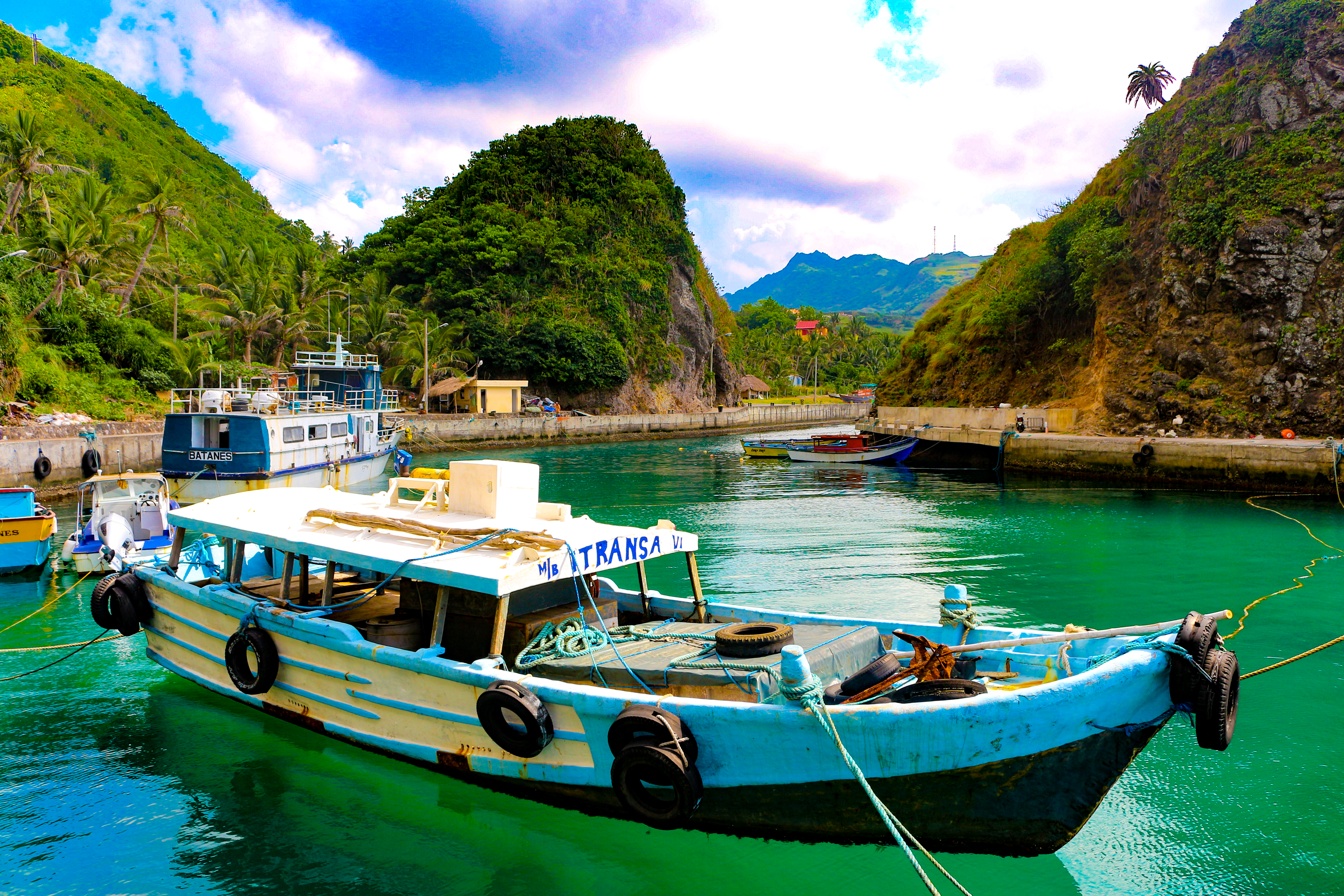
A falua boat in Basco

== Transportation ==
Basco is accessible by air from Manila via Basco Airport. It is served by PAL Express at present. The other airlines previously operating at Basco Airport have stopped their operations after the COVID 19 pandemic, except for SkyPasada via Tuguegarao Airport in Cagayan. These airlines are the only two airlines available for air travel as of 2024. Planes from Basco Airport are bound to only three places: (1) to Manila, served by PAL Express; (2) to Tuguegarao City, Cagayan, served by SkyPasada; and (3) to Itbayat Island, an island municipality of Batanes Province.

== Telecommunication ==
Mobile and internet services are primarily provided by telecom companies such as Smart Communications and Globe Telecom.

== Education ==
The Schools Division of Batanes governs the town's public education system. The division office is a field office of the DepEd in Cagayan Valley region. The Basco Schools Distric Office governs the public and private elementary and high schools throughout the municipality.

=== Primary and elementary schools ===
- Basco Central School
- Chanarian Elementary School
- Diptan Elementary School
- Tukon Elementary School

=== Secondary schools ===
- Batanes National Science High School
- Batanes General Comprehensive High School
- Valugan Integrated School

=== Higher educational institutions ===
- Batanes State College
- Saint Dominic College of Batanes

== Media ==
=== AM ===
- 1134 kHz DWBT Radyo Pilipinas Batanes

=== FM ===
- 95.7 MHz DZYV Radio Yvatan
- 97.5 MHz DZNB Radyo Kayvayvanan Community Radio
- 103.7 MHz DWWF Radyo Natin Basco

=== TV ===
- DWAZ - GMA-7 Batanes (GMA Network)
