= Mahatao =

Municipality in Batanes, Philippines

- Municipality
- Municipality of Mahatao
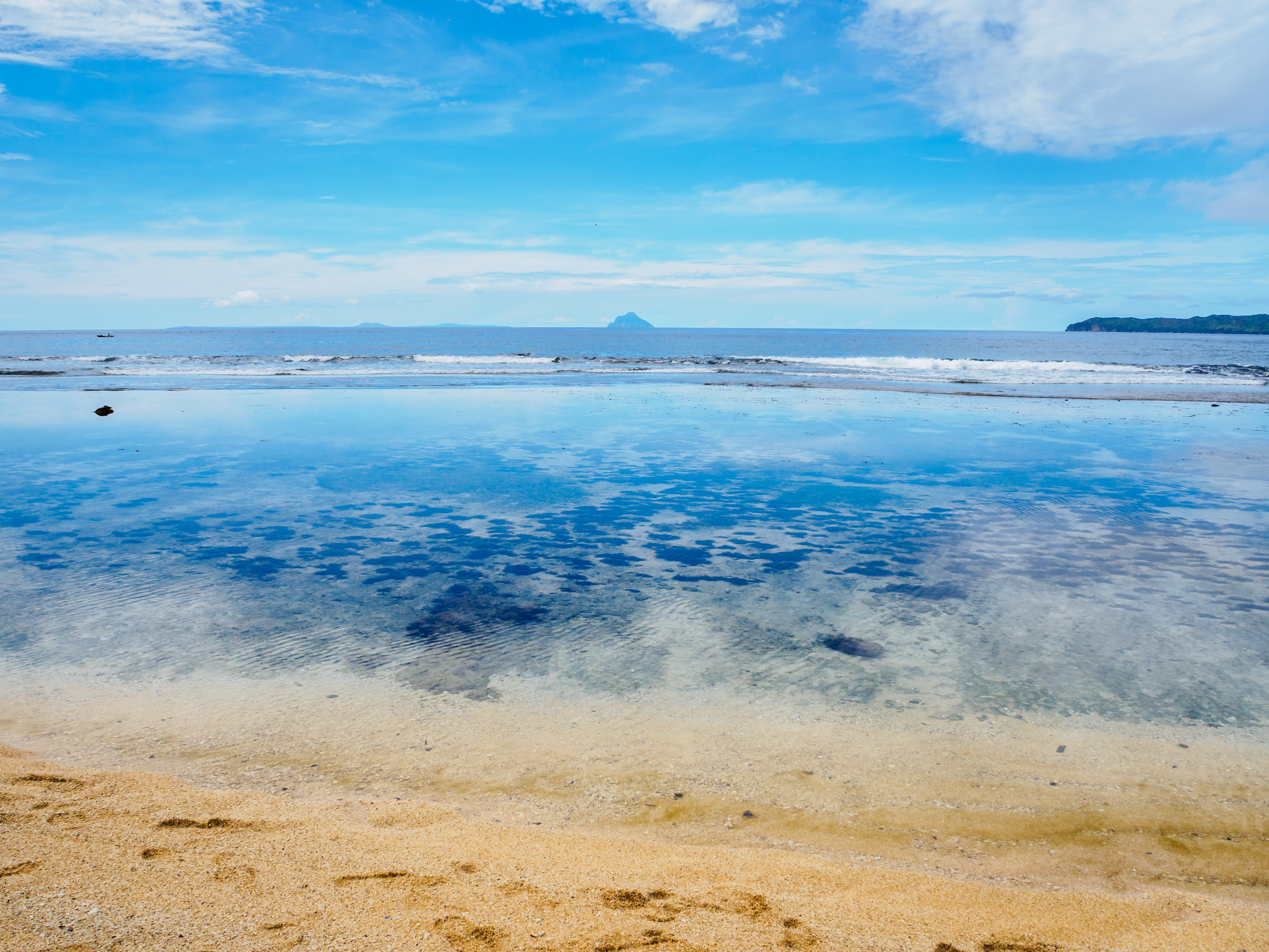
- Maydangeb Beach San Carlos Borromeo Parish Church Landscape with Tayid Ligthhouse

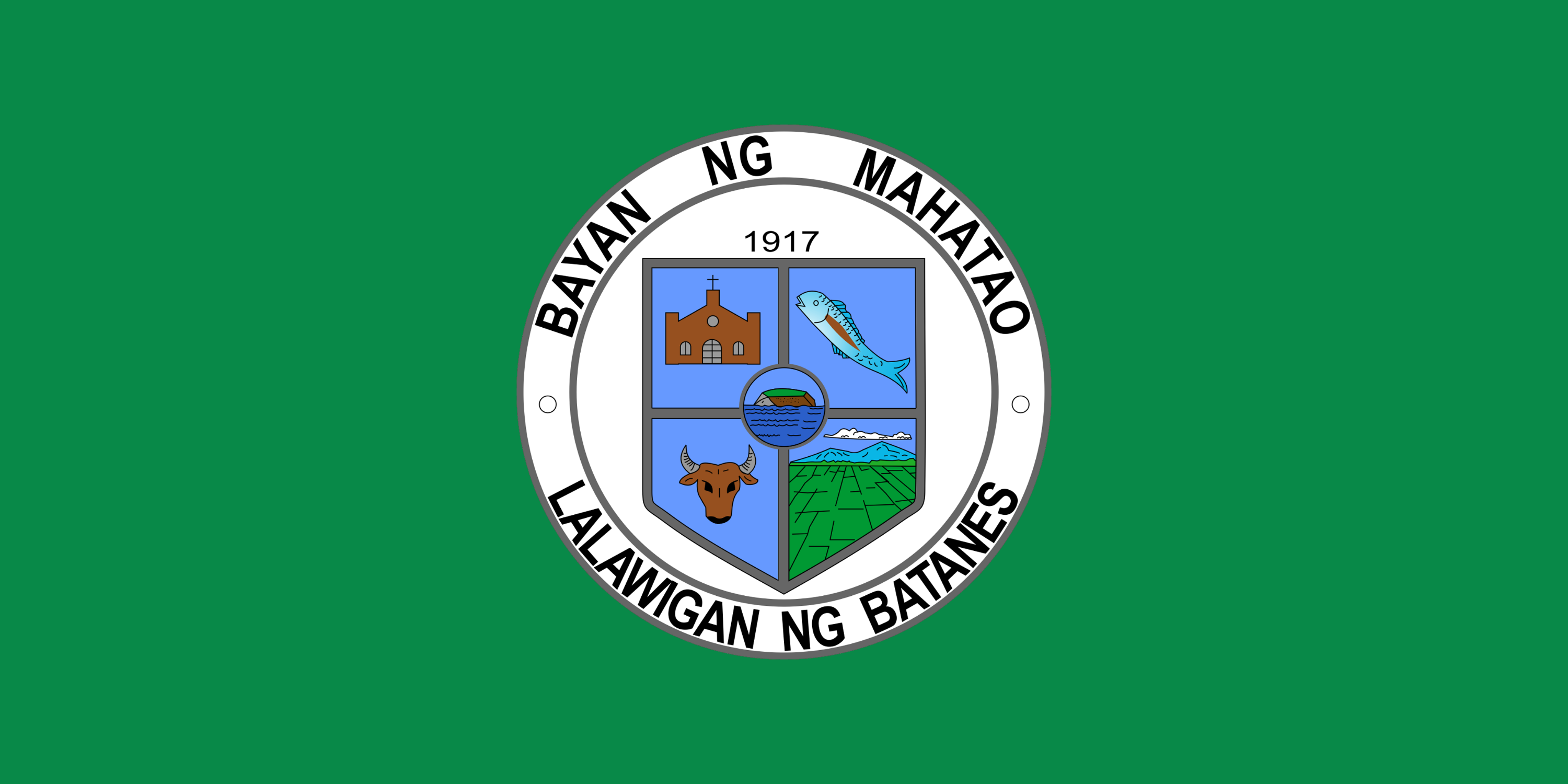
- Flag Seal

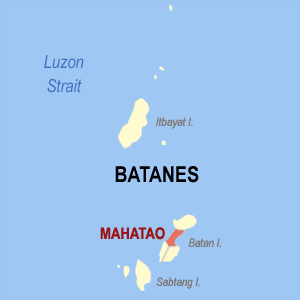
- Map of Batanes with Mahatao highlighted
- Interactive map of Mahatao
- Location within the Philippines Mahatao (Luzon) Mahatao (Batanes)
- Coordinates: 20°25′N 121°57′E
- Country: Philippines
- Region: Cagayan Valley
- Province: Batanes
- District: Lone district
- Barangays: 4 (see Barangays)

Government
  - Type: Sangguniang Bayan
  - Mayor: Geronimo Carba
  - Vice Mayor: Genes Galarion
  - Representative: Ciriaco B. Gato Jr.
  - Municipal Council: Members: Noe Avelino Fabro; Macario Cabrito Jr.; Arthur Tabig; Ethel Avanceña; Joel Fabre; Donald Cariaso; Bhaybie Fagut; Jig Balasbas
  - Electorate: 1,515 voters (2025)

Area
  - Total: 12.90 km^{2} (4.98 sq mi)
- Elevation: 63 m (207 ft)
- Highest elevation: 1,013 m (3,323 ft)
- Lowest elevation: 0 m (0 ft)

Population (2024 census)
  - Total: 1,745
  - Density: 135.3/km^{2} (350.4/sq mi)
  - Households: 497

Economy
  - Income class: 5th municipal income class
  - Poverty incidence: 12.98% (2023)
  - Revenue: ₱ 61.82 million (2024)
  - Assets: ₱ 152.3 million (2024)
  - Expenditure: ₱ 63.82 million (2024)
  - Liabilities: ₱ 55.08 million (2024)

Service provider
  - Electricity: Batanes Electric Cooperative (BATANELCO)
- Time zone: UTC+8 (PST)
- ZIP code: 3901
- PSGC: 0200904000
- IDD : area code: +63 (0)78
- Native languages: Ivatan; Tagalog; Ilocano

Mahatao, officially the Municipality of Mahatao (Note: Ivatan: Kavahayan nu Mahatao; Ilocano: Ili ti Mahatao; Tagalog: Bayan ng Mahatao), is a municipality in the province of Batanes, Philippines. According to the 2024 census, it has a population of 1,745 people.

== History ==
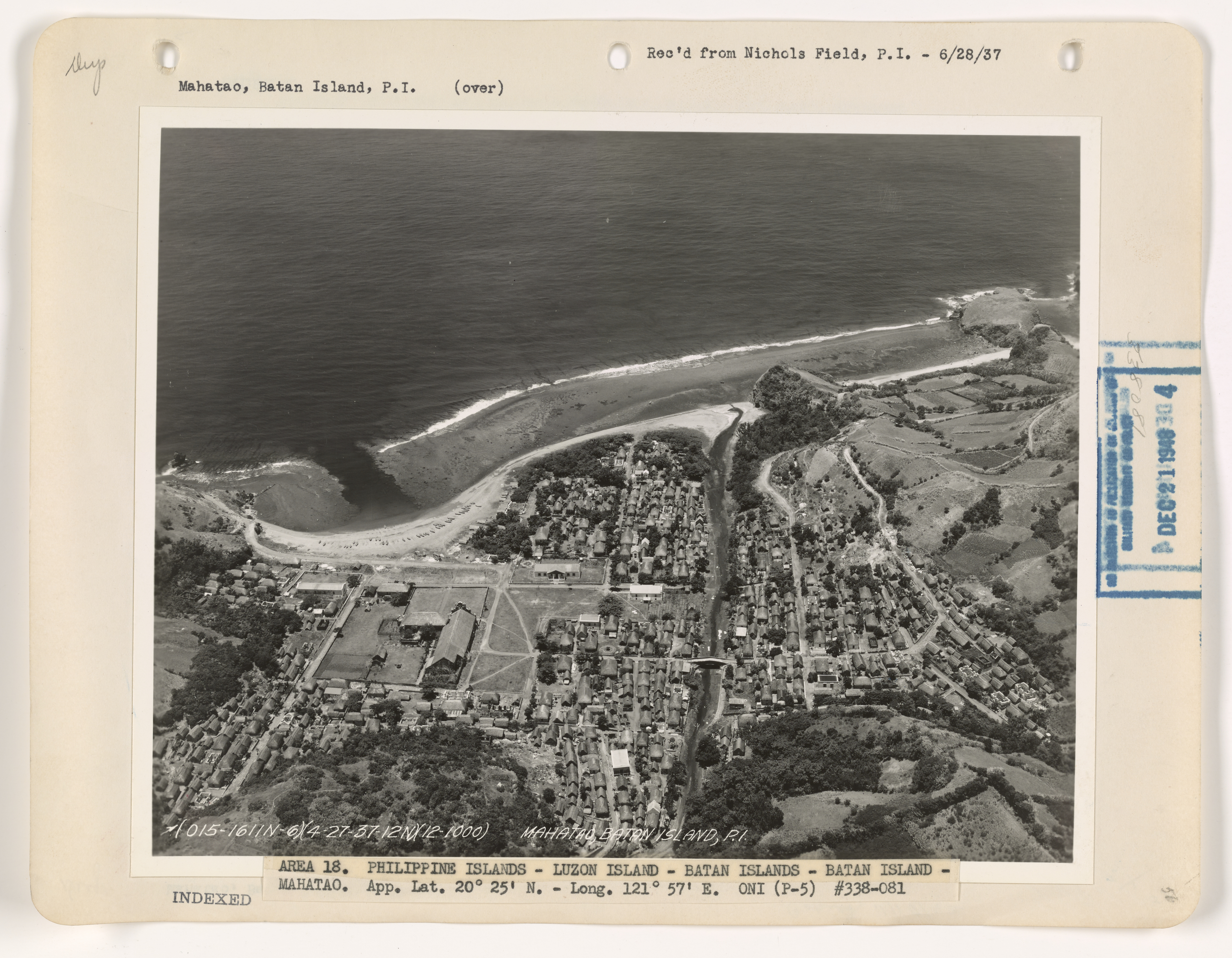
Aerial view of Mahatao, 1937

== Geography ==
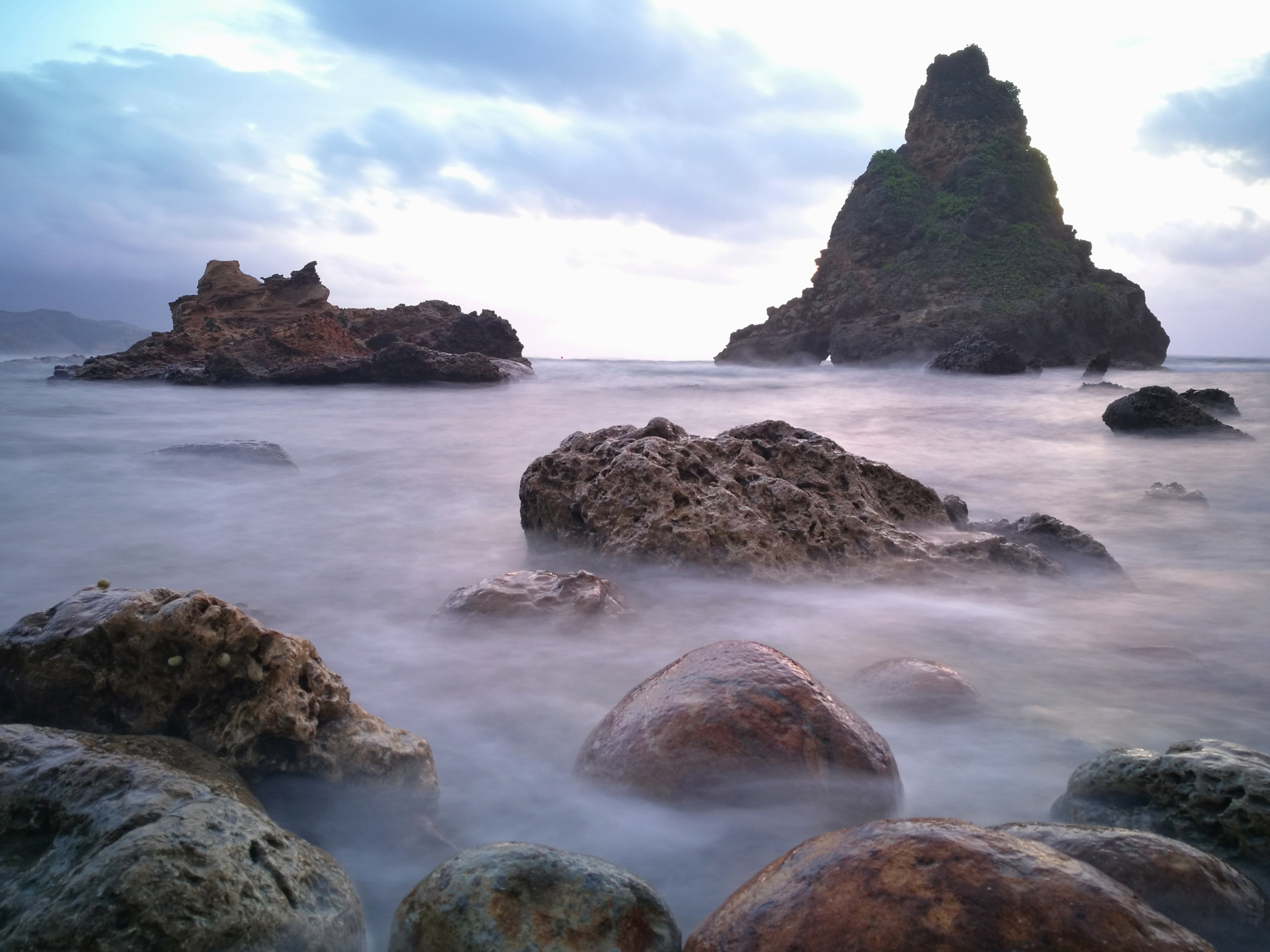
Diura fishing village

Mahatao is located at 20°25′N 121°57′E.

According to the Philippine Statistics Authority, the municipality has a land area of 12.90 square kilometres (4.98 sq mi) constituting 5.89% of the 219.01-square-kilometre- (84.56 sq mi) total area of Batanes.

=== Barangays ===
Mahatao is politically subdivided into 4 barangays. These barangays are headed by elected officials: Barangay Captain, Barangay Council, whose members are called Barangay Councilors. All are elected every three years.

Hanib was corrected into Hañib by the Philippine Statistics Authority.

| PSGC | Barangay | Population | | | ±% p.a. | |
| | | 2024 | | 2010 | | |
|---|---|---|---|---|---|---|
| 020904001 | Hañib | 22.2% | 387 | 372 | ▴ | 0.27% |
| 020904002 | Kaumbakan | 27.9% | 486 | 483 | ▴ | 0.04% |
| 020904003 | Panatayan | 26.5% | 462 | 416 | ▴ | 0.72% |
| 020904004 | Uvoy (Poblacion) | 23.5% | 410 | 312 | ▴ | 1.89% |
| | Total | | 1,745 | 1,583 | ▴ | 0.67% |

=== Climate ===
Climate data for Mahatao, Batanes
| Month | Jan | Feb | Mar | Apr | May | Jun | Jul | Aug | Sep | Oct | Nov | Dec | Year |
|---|---|---|---|---|---|---|---|---|---|---|---|---|---|
| Mean daily maximum °C (°F) | 23 (73) | 23 (73) | 24 (75) | 26 (79) | 28 (82) | 29 (84) | 29 (84) | 29 (84) | 28 (82) | 27 (81) | 26 (79) | 24 (75) | 26 (79) |
| Mean daily minimum °C (°F) | 22 (72) | 22 (72) | 23 (73) | 25 (77) | 27 (81) | 28 (82) | 28 (82) | 28 (82) | 27 (81) | 26 (79) | 25 (77) | 23 (73) | 25 (78) |
| Average precipitation mm (inches) | 44 (1.7) | 35 (1.4) | 29 (1.1) | 48 (1.9) | 204 (8.0) | 238 (9.4) | 291 (11.5) | 325 (12.8) | 304 (12.0) | 202 (8.0) | 141 (5.6) | 60 (2.4) | 1,921 (75.8) |
| Average rainy days | 11.1 | 9.1 | 8.3 | 9.2 | 15.7 | 17.1 | 19.4 | 21.9 | 21.1 | 18.4 | 16.3 | 12.4 | 180 |
Source: Meteoblue

== Demographics ==
Population census of Mahatao
| Year | Pop. | ±% p.a. |
|---|---|---|
| 1903 | 1,129 | — |
| 1918 | 1,054 | −0.46% |
| 1939 | 1,238 | +0.77% |
| 1948 | 1,492 | +2.10% |
| 1960 | 1,242 | −1.52% |
| 1970 | 1,475 | +1.73% |
| 1975 | 1,476 | +0.01% |
| 1980 | 1,388 | −1.22% |
| 1990 | 1,724 | +2.19% |
| 1995 | 1,556 | −1.90% |
| 2000 | 1,895 | +4.32% |
| 2007 | 1,539 | −2.83% |
| 2010 | 1,583 | +1.03% |
| 2015 | 1,555 | −0.34% |
| 2020 | 1,703 | +1.93% |
| 2024 | 1,745 | +0.59% |
Source: Philippine Statistics Authority

In the 2024 census, Mahatao had a population of 1,745. The population density was 140 inhabitants per square kilometre (360/sq mi).

== Economy ==
Poverty incidence of Mahatao (%)

Source: Philippine Statistics Authority

== Government ==
=== Local government ===
Mahatao is part of the lone congressional district of the province of Batanes. It is governed by a mayor, designated as its local chief executive, and by a municipal council as its legislative body in accordance with the Local Government Code. The mayor, vice mayor, and the councilors are elected directly by the people through an election which is being held every three years.

=== Elected officials ===
Members of the Municipal Council (2025–2028)
| Position | Name |
|---|---|
| Congressman | Ciriaco B. Gato Jr. |
| Mayor | Jeronimo Carba |
| Vice-Mayor | Genes Galarion |
| Councilors | Noe Avelino Fabro |
| Councilors | Macario Cabrito Jr. |
| Councilors | Unching Tabig |
| Councilors | Ethel Avanceña |
| Councilors | Joel Fabre |
| Councilors | Donald Cariaso |
| Councilors | Bhaybie Fagut |
| Councilors | Jig Balasbas |

=== Defense ===
The Mahatao Forward Operating Base, a military facility operated by the Armed Forces of the Philippines, was established in the town in 2025.

== Education ==
The Schools Division of Batanes governs the town's public education system and the entire province as a whole. The division office is a field office of the DepEd in Cagayan Valley region. The Mahatao Schools District Office governs the public and private elementary and secondary schools throughout the municipality.

=== Primary and elementary schools ===
- Diura Barrio School
- Mahatao Central School

=== Secondary school ===
- Mahatao National High School
