= Batan Island =

Island in Batanes, Philippines

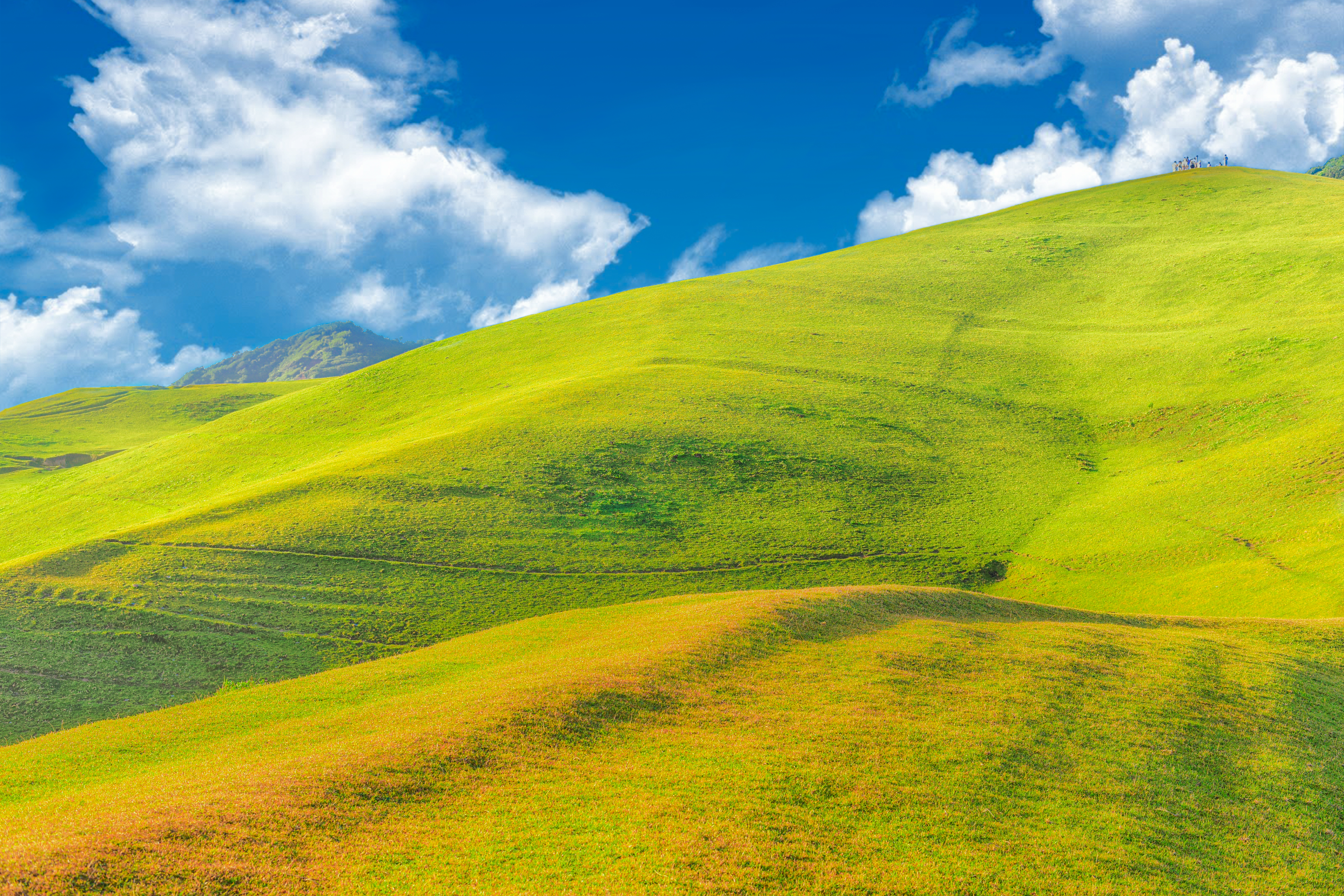
- Rakuh A Payaman

- Location within Batanes Location within Luzon Location within Philippines

Geography
- Location: Luzon Strait
- Coordinates: 20°25′17″N 121°57′37″E
- Archipelago: Batanes Islands
- Adjacent to: Balintang Channel; Philippine Sea; South China Sea
- Area: 95.18 km^{2} (36.75 sq mi)
- Length: 20 km (12 mi)
- Width: 6.5 km (4.04 mi) at its widest
- Highest elevation: 1,009 m (3310 ft)
- Highest point: Mount Iraya

Administration
- Philippines
- Region: Cagayan Valley
- Province: Batanes
- Municipalities: Basco; Ivana; Mahatao; Uyugan

Demographics
- Population: 14,007 (2020 est.)
- Pop. density: 134/km^{2} (347/sq mi)
- Ethnic groups: Ivatans

Additional information

Batan Island (/bɑːˈtɑːn/ bah-TAHN) is the main island of Batanes, an archipelagic province in the Philippines. It is the second largest of the Batanes Islands, the northernmost group of islands in the Philippines.

== Geography ==
Batan is a dumbbell-shaped volcanic island, part of the Luzon Volcanic Arc. The northern part of the island is dominated by the 1,009-meter (3,310 ft) high active volcano, Mount Iraya, which last erupted in 1454. The lower portion of the island is the inactive volcano Mount Matarem, about 405 meters (1,329 ft) tall. A hilly narrow neck of land, about 4.5 kilometers (2.8 mi) long and from 1.9 to 2.5 kilometers (1.2 to 1.6 mi) wide, separates the two volcanoes of the island. At around the vicinity of Mount Matarem, the island is at its widest at about 6.5 kilometers (4.0 mi).

Sabtang Island, the nearest island to Batan is located about 4.5 kilometers (2.8 mi) southwest of the southern tip of the island. Itbayat, the largest island of the archipelago, is about 32 kilometers (20 mi) northwest of the central part of Batan.

== Geology ==
The Batan Volcanic Complex includes the Pliocene Matarem composite volcano of basalt and andesite flows, 5.8 to 1.7 Ma, on the southern part of the island, and the Quaternary Mt. Iraya basalt and andesite lava flows on the northern part of the island. The central isthmus has an outcrop of Late Miocene andesitic flows, 9 - 7 Ma. Western Mt. Iraya has a pyroclastic flow deposit dated 1,480 years B.P. including ash and pumice. The periphery of Mt. Matarem includes lahar and tuffaceous deposits. The Miocene Batan Group are sedimentary rocks that includes the Liguan, Caracaran and Bilbao formations. The Middle Miocene Bilbao limestone overlies the Early Miocene Caracaran siltstone, which overlies the Liguan limestone. The Liguan and Bilbao include coal measures up to 300 meters thick.

== History ==
=== Japanese invasion ===
The Japanese invasion of the Philippines began with the invasion of Batan Island by a 490-man naval combat unit and a number of air corps troops aboard two transports escorted by one destroyer and four torpedo boats. This was the first landing on American territory, which transpired on the same day as the attack on Pearl Harbor.

Japanese forces quickly secured the existing small airfield outside Basco without resistance and began expansion work immediately as a forward base of operations against Luzon. Work was discontinued only a few days later as the success of the Japanese bombing of Clark Field rendered an airfield in Basco redundant. On 10 December 1941, the naval combat force was redeployed.

== Governance ==
Four of the six municipalities of Batanes are located on the 20-kilometer (12 mi) long island including the provincial capital of Basco. The other municipalities are Ivana, Mahatao and Uyugan.

== Gallery ==
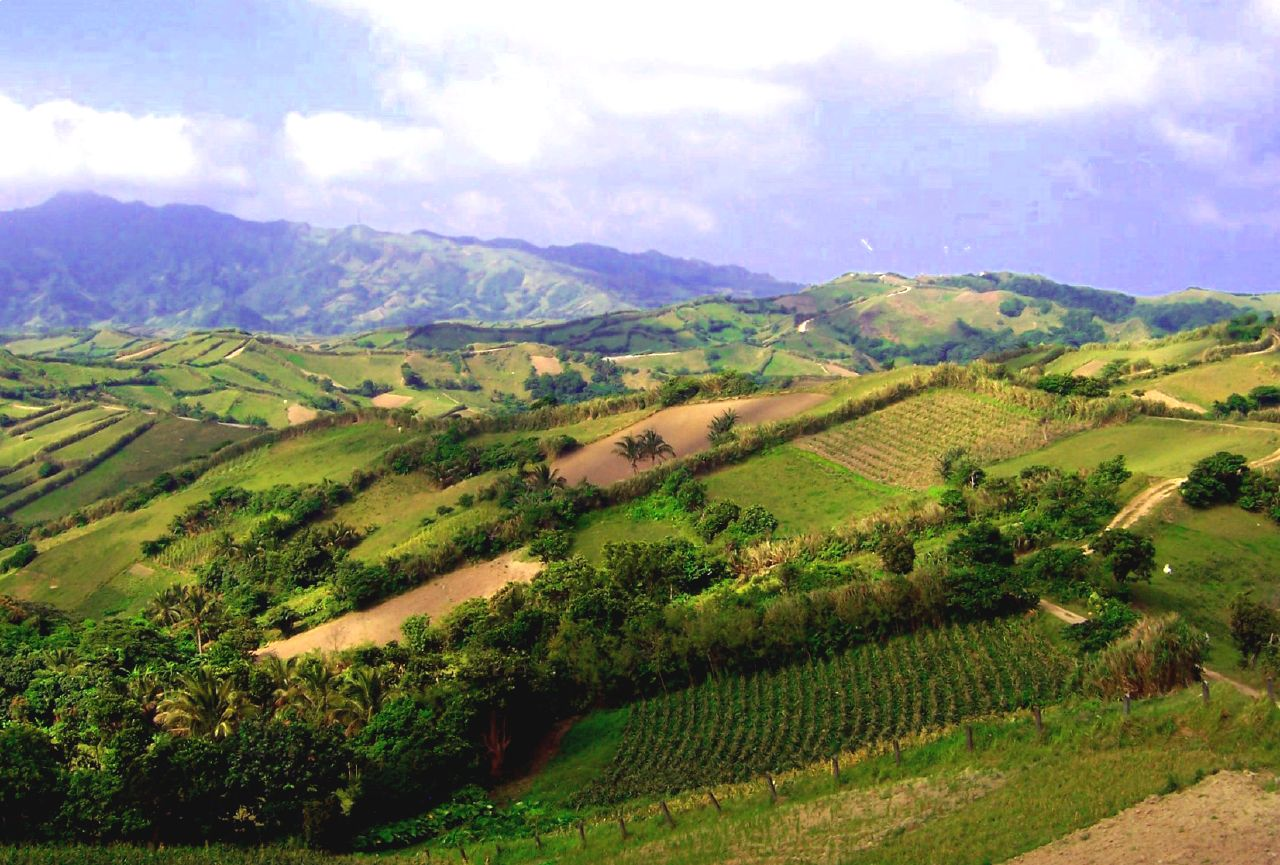
The hilly landscape of Batan Island with Mount Matarem in the distant left

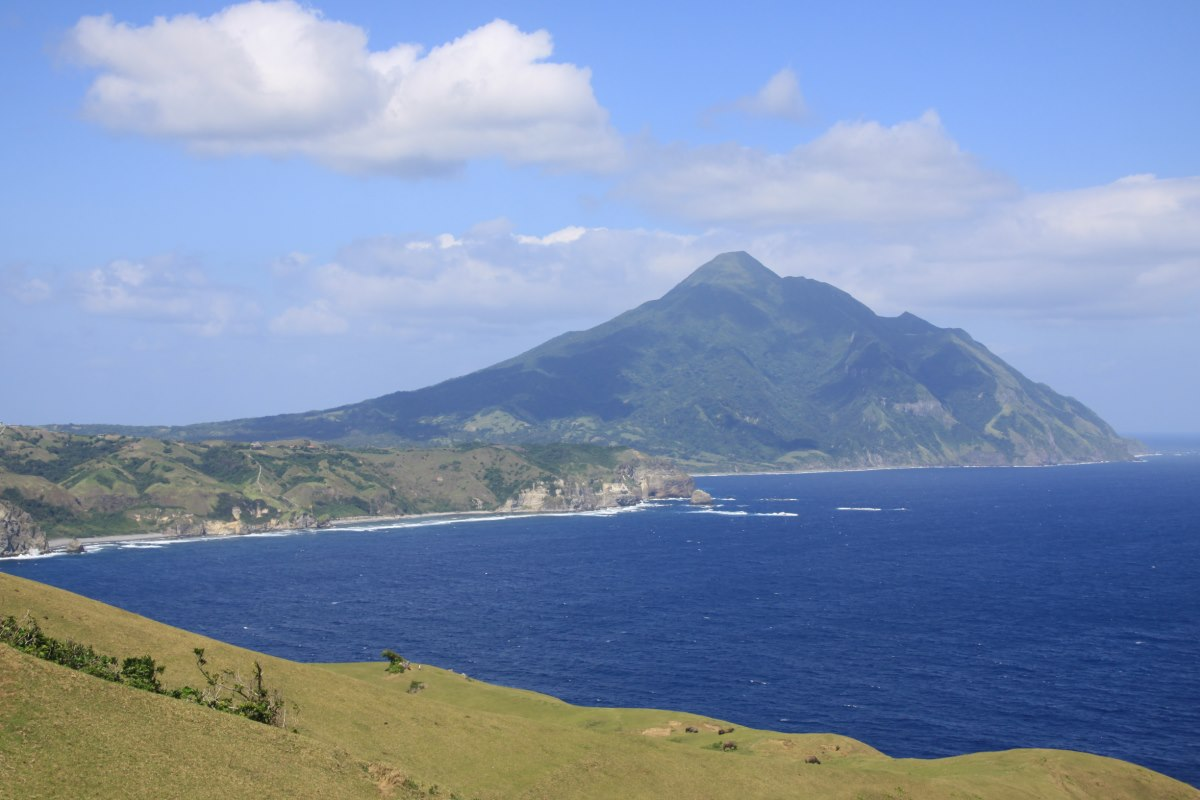
Mount Iraya

== See also ==
- Ivatan language
- List of islands of the Philippines
