= 2025 Philippine local elections in Cagayan Valley =

- May 12, 2025
- Gubernatorial elections
- 5 provincial governors and 1 city mayor
Party	Seats	+/–
PFP	4	+4
Lakas	1	+1
Nacionalista	1	−1
This lists parties that won seats. See the complete results below.
- Vice gubernatorial elections
- 5 provincial vice governors and 1 city vice mayor
Party	Seats	+/–
Lakas	2	+1
PFP	2	+2
Aksyon	1	New
Nacionalista	1	+1
This lists parties that won seats. See the complete results below.
- Provincial Board elections
- 50 provincial board members and 10 city councilors
Party	Seats	+/–
Lakas	20	+10
PFP	17	+15
Nacionalista	8	0
NPC	4	−2
Aksyon	3	−1
Liberal	3	−3
LDP	1	0
UNA	1	+1
Independent	3	−2
This lists parties that won seats. See the complete results below.

The 2025 Philippine local elections in Cagayan Valley were held on May 12, 2025.

== Summary ==
=== Governors ===
Province/city	Incumbent	Incumbent's party	Winner	Winner's party	Winning margin
Batanes	Marilou Cayco	PFP	Jun Aguto	PFP	1.87%
Cagayan	Manuel Mamba	Nacionalista	Edgar Aglipay	Nacionalista	4.29%
Isabela	Rodolfo Albano III	PFP	Rodolfo Albano III	PFP	Unopposed
Nueva Vizcaya	Jose Gambito	PFP	Jose Gambito	PFP	28.19%
Quirino	Dakila Cua	PFP	Dakila Cua	PFP	Unopposed
Santiago (ICC)	Sheena Tan	Lakas	Sheena Tan	Lakas	51.80%

=== Vice governors ===
Province/city	Incumbent	Incumbent's party	Winner	Winner's party	Winning margin
Batanes	Ignacio Villa	Liberal	Jhong Nanud	PFP	3.81%
Cagayan	Melvin Vargas Jr.	Independent	Manuel Mamba	Nacionalista	36.35%
Isabela	Faustino Dy III	PFP	Kiko Dy	Lakas	Unopposed
Nueva Vizcaya	Eufemia Dacayo	Aksyon	Eufemia Dacayo	Aksyon	9.75%
Quirino	Jojo Vaquilar	PFP	Jojo Vaquilar	PFP	Unopposed
Santiago (ICC)	Alvin Abaya	PDP–Laban	Jamayne Tan	Lakas	24.04%

=== Provincial boards ===
Province/city	Seats	Party control		Composition
Province/city	Seats	Previous	Result	Composition
Batanes	8 elected 4 ex-officio	No majority	No majority	Liberal (3); PFP (3); NPC (1); Independent (1)
Cagayan	10 elected 3 ex-officio	No majority	Lakas	Lakas (7); Nacionalista (3)
Isabela	12 elected 7 ex-officio	No majority	No majority	PFP (6); NPC (2); Lakas (2); Aksyon (1); LDP (1)
Nueva Vizcaya	10 elected 4 ex-officio	No majority	No majority	Nacionalista (5); Lakas (2); Aksyon (1); PFP (1); UNA (1)
Quirino	10 elected 4 ex-officio	No majority	No majority	PFP (7); NPC (1); Independent (2)
Santiago (ICC)	10 elected 3 ex-officio	No majority	Lakas	Lakas (9); Aksyon (1)

== Batanes ==
=== Governor ===
Term-limited incumbent Governor Marilou Cayco of the Partido Federal ng Pilipinas (PFP) ran for the House of Representatives in Batanes's lone legislative district. She was previously affiliated with the Liberal Party.

The PFP nominated former Batanes vice governor Jun Aguto, who won against Jun Abad (Nationalist People's Coalition), Batanes vice governor Ignacio Villa (Liberal Party) and former Batanes governor Telesforo Castillejos (Aksyon Demokratiko).

Candidate	Party	Votes	%
Jun Aguto	Partido Federal ng Pilipinas	3,947	35.31
Jun Abad	Nationalist People's Coalition	3,738	33.44
Ignacio Villa	Liberal Party	2,018	18.05
Telesforo Castillejos	Aksyon Demokratiko	1,476	13.20
Total		11,179	100.00
Valid votes		11,179	97.31
Invalid/blank votes		309	2.69
Total votes		11,488	100.00
Registered voters/turnout		13,655	84.13
PFP hold			
Source: Commission on Elections

=== Vice Governor ===
Incumbent Vice Governor Ignacio Villa of the Liberal Party ran for governor of Batanes.

The Liberal Party nominated Wally Estamo, who was defeated by Uyugan mayor Jhong Nanud of the Partido Federal ng Pilipinas. Former provincial board member Ferdie Elica (Nationalist People's Coalition) and provincial board member Juan Redondo (Aksyon Demokratiko) also ran for vice governor.

Candidate	Party	Votes	%
Jhong Nanud	Partido Federal ng Pilipinas	3,269	30.81
Ferdie Elica	Nationalist People's Coalition	2,865	27.00
Wally Estamo	Liberal Party	2,795	26.34
Juan Redondo	Aksyon Demokratiko	1,682	15.85
Total		10,611	100.00
Valid votes		10,611	92.37
Invalid/blank votes		877	7.63
Total votes		11,488	100.00
Registered voters/turnout		13,655	84.13
PFP gain from Liberal			
Source: Commission on Elections

=== Provincial Board ===
Since Batanes' reclassification as a 4th class province in 2025, the Batanes Provincial Board is composed of 12 board members, eight of whom are elected.

The Liberal Party tied with the Partido Federal ng Pilipinas at three seats each, losing its status as the largest party in the provincial board.

Party	Votes	%	Seats	+/–
Liberal Party	13,596	41.39	3	0
Partido Federal ng Pilipinas	9,107	27.72	3	New
Nationalist People's Coalition	6,624	20.16	1	0
Aksyon Demokratiko	1,558	4.74	0	New
Independent	1,964	5.98	1	New
Total	32,849	100.00	8	+2
Total votes	11,488	–		
Registered voters/turnout	13,655	84.13		
Source: Commission on Elections

==== 1st district ====
Batanes's 1st provincial district consists of the municipalities of Basco and Mahatao. Five board members are elected from this provincial district.

Eight candidates were included in the ballot.

Candidate	Party	Votes	%
Roel Nicolas (incumbent)	Liberal Party	4,165	19.26
Ann Viola (incumbent)	Liberal Party	3,982	18.41
Pipin Castillo	Partido Federal ng Pilipinas	3,156	14.59
Benny Fajardo	Liberal Party	2,696	12.47
John Dave Ablat	Partido Federal ng Pilipinas	2,372	10.97
Arlyne Castillo-Velayo	Nationalist People's Coalition	1,866	8.63
Celerina Navarro	Nationalist People's Coalition	1,830	8.46
Juanita Acacio	Aksyon Demokratiko	1,558	7.20
Total		21,625	100.00
Total votes		6,433	–
Registered voters/turnout		7,685	83.71
Source: Commission on Elections

==== 2nd district ====
Batanes's 2nd provincial district consists of the municipalities of Itbayat, Ivana, Sabtang and Uyugan. Three board members are elected from this provincial district.

Seven candidates were included in the ballot.

Candidate	Party	Votes	%
Leonardo Hostallero	Partido Federal ng Pilipinas	2,072	18.46
Cleo Gonzales	Independent	1,964	17.50
Byron Peralta (incumbent)	Nationalist People's Coalition	1,589	14.16
Preciosa Rivera	Partido Federal ng Pilipinas	1,507	13.43
Juliet Cataluna (incumbent)	Liberal Party	1,475	13.14
Juan Caballero	Nationalist People's Coalition	1,339	11.93
Rogelio Delapa	Liberal Party	1,278	11.39
Total		11,224	100.00
Total votes		5,055	–
Registered voters/turnout		5,970	84.67
Source: Commission on Elections

== Cagayan ==
=== Governor ===
Term-limited incumbent Governor Manuel Mamba of the Nacionalista Party ran for vice governor of Cagayan.

The Nacionalista Party nominated former Philippine National Police chief Edgar Aglipay, who won the election against Zarah Lara (Nationalist People's Coalition) and Cagayan vice governor Melvin Vargas Jr. (Independent).

Candidate	Party	Votes	%
Edgar Aglipay	Nacionalista Party	258,470	40.45
Zarah Rose Lara	Nationalist People's Coalition	231,041	36.16
Melvin Vargas Jr.	Independent	149,475	23.39
Total		638,986	100.00
Valid votes		638,986	94.80
Invalid/blank votes		35,078	5.20
Total votes		674,064	100.00
Registered voters/turnout		785,994	85.76
Nacionalista hold			
Source: Commission on Elections

=== Vice Governor ===
Term-limited incumbent Vice Governor Melvin Vargas Jr. ran for governor of Cagayan as an independent. He was previously affiliated with the PDP–Laban.

Vargas endorsed former Cagayan governor Alvaro Antonio of the Partido Federal ng Pilipinas, who was defeated by Cagayan governor Manuel Mamba of the Nacionalista Party. Former Cagayan vice governor Odi Fausto (Nationalist People's Coalition) also ran for vice governor.

Candidate	Party	Votes	%
Manuel Mamba	Nacionalista Party	348,954	58.19
Odi Fausto	Nationalist People's Coalition	130,980	21.84
Alvaro Antonio	Partido Federal ng Pilipinas	119,734	19.97
Total		599,668	100.00
Valid votes		599,668	88.96
Invalid/blank votes		74,396	11.04
Total votes		674,064	100.00
Registered voters/turnout		785,994	85.76
Nacionalista gain from Independent			
Source: Commission on Elections

=== Provincial Board ===
The Cagayan Provincial Board is composed of 13 board members, 10 of whom are elected.

Lakas–CMD won seven seats, gaining a majority in the provincial board.

Party	Votes	%	Seats	+/–
Lakas–CMD	644,366	41.33	7	+4
Nacionalista Party	564,055	36.18	3	+2
Nationalist People's Coalition	130,891	8.39	0	–2
Liberal Party	65,279	4.19	0	New
Aksyon Demokratiko	45,006	2.89	0	New
Independent	109,604	7.03	0	–3
Total	1,559,201	100.00	10	0
Total votes	674,064	–		
Registered voters/turnout	785,994	85.76		
Source: Commission on Elections

==== 1st district ====
Cagayan's 1st provincial district consists of the same area as Cagayan's 1st legislative district. Three board members are elected from this provincial district.

Nine candidates were included in the ballot.

Candidate	Party	Votes	%
Weng Retoma	Lakas–CMD	97,230	20.90
Kamille Ponce (incumbent)	Lakas–CMD	87,057	18.72
Romeo Garcia (incumbent)	Nacionalista Party	80,533	17.31
Bong Ramos	Nationalist People's Coalition	47,126	10.13
Joan Cabildo-Dunuan	Nacionalista Party	45,214	9.72
Hang Liggayu	Aksyon Demokratiko	45,006	9.68
Red Sac	Nacionalista Party	34,195	7.35
Joaquin Agatep Jr.	Independent	21,097	4.54
Reymar Desiderio	Independent	7,699	1.66
Total		465,157	100.00
Total votes		240,095	–
Registered voters/turnout		280,282	85.66
Source: Commission on Elections

==== 2nd district ====
Cagayan's 2nd provincial district consists of the same area as Cagayan's 2nd legislative district. Three board members are elected from this provincial district.

Nine candidates were included in the ballot.

Candidate	Party	Votes	%
Randy Ursulum (incumbent)	Lakas–CMD	98,159	25.41
Alniñoson Kevin Timbas (incumbent)	Lakas–CMD	69,762	18.06
Vilmer Viloria	Lakas–CMD	68,894	17.83
Lalaine Pamittan	Nacionalista Party	41,348	10.70
Jose Tayawa	Nacionalista Party	36,597	9.47
Raquel dela Cruz	Nacionalista Party	32,604	8.44
Arvin Garcia	Nationalist People's Coalition	14,523	3.76
Marites Tacipit	Independent	14,480	3.75
Wilfredo Aguinaldo II	Independent	9,983	2.58
Total		386,350	100.00
Total votes		180,133	–
Registered voters/turnout		210,751	85.47
Source: Commission on Elections

==== 3rd district ====
Cagayan's 3rd provincial district consists of the same area as Cagayan's 3rd legislative district. Four board members are elected from this provincial district.

12 candidates were included in the ballot.

Candidate	Party	Votes	%
AJ Ponce	Lakas–CMD	117,055	16.54
Jojo Caronan	Nacionalista Party	89,092	12.59
Romar de Asis	Nacionalista Party	82,879	11.71
Odiboy Fausto	Lakas–CMD	73,286	10.36
Raymund Guzman	Nacionalista Party	73,282	10.36
Claire Callangan	Nationalist People's Coalition	69,242	9.78
Marj Martin	Liberal Party	65,279	9.22
Pearl Mabasa	Nacionalista Party	48,311	6.83
Gilbert Labang	Independent	41,239	5.83
Phil Pattaguan	Lakas–CMD	32,923	4.65
Santi Balisi	Independent	8,617	1.22
Aldrin Bargado	Independent	6,489	0.92
Total		707,694	100.00
Total votes		253,836	–
Registered voters/turnout		294,961	86.06
Source: Commission on Elections

== Isabela ==
=== Governor ===
Incumbent Governor Rodolfo Albano III of the Partido Federal ng Pilipinas won re-election for a third term unopposed. He was previously affiliated with PDP–Laban.

Candidate	Party	Votes	%
Rodolfo Albano III (incumbent)	Partido Federal ng Pilipinas	651,999	100.00
Total		651,999	100.00
Valid votes		651,999	76.95
Invalid/blank votes		195,302	23.05
Total votes		847,301	100.00
Registered voters/turnout		1,009,774	83.91
PFP hold			
Source: Commission on Elections

=== Vice Governor ===
Incumbent Vice Governor Faustino Dy III of the Partido Federal ng Pilipinas ran for the House of Representatives in Isabela's 6th legislative district. He was previously affiliated with PDP–Laban.

Dy endorsed his son, Echague mayor Kiko Dy (Lakas–CMD), who won the election unopposed.

Candidate	Party	Votes	%
Kiko Dy	Lakas–CMD	566,489	100.00
Total		566,489	100.00
Valid votes		566,489	66.86
Invalid/blank votes		280,812	33.14
Total votes		847,301	100.00
Registered voters/turnout		1,009,774	83.91
Lakas gain from PFP			
Source: Commission on Elections

=== Provincial Board ===
The Isabela Provincial Board is composed of 19 board members, 12 of whom are elected.

The Partido Federal ng Pilipinas won six seats, becoming the largest party in the provincial board.

Party	Votes	%	Seats	+/–
Partido Federal ng Pilipinas	520,530	52.64	6	+5
Nationalist People's Coalition	161,813	16.37	2	0
Lakas–CMD	127,437	12.89	2	0
Aksyon Demokratiko	85,635	8.66	1	–1
Laban ng Demokratikong Pilipino	63,554	6.43	1	0
Independent	29,791	3.01	0	0
Total	988,760	100.00	12	0
Total votes	847,301	–		
Registered voters/turnout	1,009,774	83.91		
Source: Commission on Elections

==== 1st district ====
Isabela's 1st provincial district consists of the same area as Isabela's 1st legislative district. Two board members are elected from this provincial district.

Three candidates were included in the ballot.

Candidate	Party	Votes	%
Ejay Diaz	Partido Federal ng Pilipinas	135,906	55.91
Emmanuel Joselito Anes (incumbent)	Partido Federal ng Pilipinas	92,095	37.89
Celso Balayan	Independent	15,075	6.20
Total		243,076	100.00
Total votes		217,988	–
Registered voters/turnout		265,453	82.12
Source: Commission on Elections

==== 2nd district ====
Isabela's 2nd provincial district consists of the same area as Isabela's 2nd legislative district. Two board members are elected from this provincial district.

Two candidates were included in the ballot.

Candidate	Party	Votes	%
Ed Christian Go (incumbent)	Lakas–CMD	84,755	66.51
Julie Reyes	Lakas–CMD	42,682	33.49
Total		127,437	100.00
Total votes		108,230	–
Registered voters/turnout		127,579	84.83
Source: Commission on Elections

==== 3rd district ====
Isabela's 3rd provincial district consists of the same area as Isabela's 3rd legislative district. Two board members are elected from this provincial district.

Two candidates were included in the ballot.

Candidate	Party	Votes	%
Bentot Panganiban	Nationalist People's Coalition	94,730	58.54
Ramon Reyes (incumbent)	Nationalist People's Coalition	67,083	41.46
Total		161,813	100.00
Total votes		152,903	–
Registered voters/turnout		180,353	84.78
Source: Commission on Elections

==== 4th district ====
Isabela's 4th provincial district consists of the same area as Isabela's 4th legislative district, excluding the city of Santiago. Two board members are elected from this provincial district.

Two candidates were included in the ballot.

Candidate	Party	Votes	%
Clifford Raspado (incumbent)	Partido Federal ng Pilipinas	42,286	51.59
Abegail Sable	Partido Federal ng Pilipinas	39,682	48.41
Total		81,968	100.00
Total votes		68,445	–
Registered voters/turnout		80,980	84.52
Source: Commission on Elections

==== 5th district ====
Isabela's 5th provincial district consists of the same area as Isabela's 5th legislative district. Two board members are elected from this provincial district.

Four candidates were included in the ballot.

Candidate	Party	Votes	%
Totep Calderon	Aksyon Demokratiko	85,635	41.62
King Dy (incumbent)	Laban ng Demokratikong Pilipino	63,554	30.89
Edward Isidro (incumbent)	Partido Federal ng Pilipinas	41,829	20.33
Renen Paraguison	Independent	14,716	7.15
Total		205,734	100.00
Total votes		146,959	–
Registered voters/turnout		172,212	85.34
Source: Commission on Elections

==== 6th district ====
Isabela's 6th provincial district consists of the same area as Isabela's 6th legislative district. Two board members are elected from this provincial district.

Two candidates were included in the ballot.

Candidate	Party	Votes	%
Arco Meris (incumbent)	Partido Federal ng Pilipinas	88,225	52.29
Amador Gaffud Jr. (incumbent)	Partido Federal ng Pilipinas	80,507	47.71
Total		168,732	100.00
Total votes		152,776	–
Registered voters/turnout		183,197	83.39
Source: Commission on Elections

== Nueva Vizcaya ==
=== Governor ===
Incumbent Governor Jose Gambito of the Partido Federal ng Pilipinas ran for a full term. Previously affiliated with Lakas–CMD, he became governor on May 5, 2023, after Carlos Padilla died.

Gambito won the election against representative Luisa Cuaresma (United Nationalist Alliance) and Maybelle Blossom Dumlao (Independent).

Candidate	Party	Votes	%
Jose Gambito (incumbent)	Partido Federal ng Pilipinas	151,517	61.66
Luisa Cuaresma	United Nationalist Alliance	82,237	33.47
Maybelle Blossom Dumlao	Independent	11,986	4.88
Total		245,740	100.00
Valid votes		245,740	95.16
Invalid/blank votes		12,509	4.84
Total votes		258,249	100.00
Registered voters/turnout		303,090	85.21
PFP hold			
Source: Commission on Elections

=== Vice Governor ===
Incumbent Vice Governor Eufemia Dacayo of Aksyon Demokratiko ran for a full term. Previously affiliated with Lakas–CMD, she became vice governor on May 3, 2023, after Jose Gambito became governor upon Carlos Padilla's death.

Dacayo won the election against Eduardo Balgos (Lakas–CMD) and Patricio Dumlao (Nacionalista Party), both provincial board members.

Candidate	Party	Votes	%
Eufemia Dacayo (incumbent)	Aksyon Demokratiko	96,129	40.30
Eduardo Balgos	Lakas–CMD	72,869	30.55
Patricio Dumlao	Nacionalista Party	69,509	29.14
Total		238,507	100.00
Valid votes		238,507	92.36
Invalid/blank votes		19,742	7.64
Total votes		258,249	100.00
Registered voters/turnout		303,090	85.21
Aksyon hold			
Source: Commission on Elections

=== Provincial Board ===
The Nueva Vizcaya Provincial Board is composed of 14 board members, 10 of whom are elected.

The Nacionalista Party won five seats, becoming the largest party in the provincial board.

Party	Votes	%	Seats	+/–
Nacionalista Party	299,393	32.58	5	+1
Lakas–CMD	297,920	32.42	2	–2
Aksyon Demokratiko	109,223	11.88	1	0
Partido Federal ng Pilipinas	109,133	11.87	1	0
United Nationalist Alliance	49,958	5.44	1	New
Kilusang Bagong Lipunan	20,584	2.24	0	New
Independent	32,823	3.57	0	0
Total	919,034	100.00	10	0
Total votes	258,249	–		
Registered voters/turnout	303,090	85.21		
Source: Commission on Elections

==== 1st district ====
Nueva Vizcaya's 1st provincial district consists of the municipalities of Ambaguio, Bagabag, Bayombong, Diadi, Quezon, Solano and Villaverde. Five board members are elected from this provincial district.

15 candidates were included in the ballot.

Candidate	Party	Votes	%
LC Cuaresma	United Nationalist Alliance	49,958	11.00
Leah Tidang	Aksyon Demokratiko	42,977	9.46
Clem Cadoy	Nacionalista Party	41,625	9.16
EJ Galanta-Martinez	Nacionalista Party	36,244	7.98
Pablo Kindot (incumbent)	Lakas–CMD	34,891	7.68
Luis Binay-an Sr.	Lakas–CMD	33,481	7.37
Jun Padilla	Nacionalista Party	32,527	7.16
Benjamin Lucas Jr.	Lakas–CMD	29,724	6.54
Paul Ligmayo	Partido Federal ng Pilipinas	27,613	6.08
Adonis Lejao	Nacionalista Party	27,557	6.07
Edgar Daniel Jr.	Lakas–CMD	26,250	5.78
Efren Quiben	Kilusang Bagong Lipunan	20,584	4.53
Jonathan Tindaan	Independent	19,251	4.24
Myrna Dupiano	Aksyon Demokratiko	15,910	3.50
Sammy Balinhawang	Aksyon Demokratiko	15,629	3.44
Total		454,221	100.00
Total votes		129,489	–
Registered voters/turnout		152,153	85.10
Source: Commission on Elections

==== 2nd district ====
Nueva Vizcaya's 2nd provincial district consists of the municipalities of Alfonso Castañeda, Aritao, Bambang, Dupax del Norte, Dupax del Sur, Kayapa, Kasibu and Santa Fe. Five board members are elected from this provincial district.

16 candidates were included in the ballot.

Candidate	Party	Votes	%
Eunice Galima-Gambol (incumbent)	Nacionalista Party	70,999	15.27
John Bagasao	Lakas–CMD	56,175	12.09
Primo Percival Marcos (incumbent)	Partido Federal ng Pilipinas	51,734	11.13
Wilson Salas	Nacionalista Party	45,830	9.86
Flodemonte Gerdan	Nacionalista Party	44,611	9.60
Milady Dickson	Lakas–CMD	41,380	8.90
Omar Santos	Partido Federal ng Pilipinas	29,786	6.41
Byron Sevillena	Lakas–CMD	27,417	5.90
Jose Evangelista	Lakas–CMD	27,133	5.84
Dionisio Bungihan	Aksyon Demokratiko	21,223	4.57
Jimmy Calata	Lakas–CMD	16,730	3.60
Poly Garing	Aksyon Demokratiko	13,484	2.90
Riz Guntalilib	Independent	5,329	1.15
Amado Dumelod	Lakas–CMD	4,739	1.02
Domeng Torio	Independent	4,477	0.96
Airene Pinkihan-Nisperos	Independent	3,766	0.81
Total		464,813	100.00
Total votes		128,760	–
Registered voters/turnout		150,937	85.31
Source: Commission on Elections

== Quirino ==
=== Governor ===
Incumbent Governor Dakila Cua of the Partido Federal ng Pilipinas won re-election for a third term unopposed. He was previously affiliated with Pederalismo ng Dugong Dakilang Samahan.

Candidate	Party	Votes	%
Dakila Cua (incumbent)	Partido Federal ng Pilipinas	97,595	100.00
Total		97,595	100.00
Valid votes		97,595	86.90
Invalid/blank votes		14,715	13.10
Total votes		112,310	100.00
Registered voters/turnout		130,307	86.19
PFP hold			
Source: Commission on Elections

=== Vice Governor ===
Incumbent Vice Governor Jojo Vaquilar of the Partido Federal ng Pilipinas won re-election for a third term unopposed. He was previously affiliated with PDP–Laban.

Candidate	Party	Votes	%
Jojo Vaquilar (incumbent)	Partido Federal ng Pilipinas	83,977	100.00
Total		83,977	100.00
Valid votes		83,977	74.77
Invalid/blank votes		28,333	25.23
Total votes		112,310	100.00
Registered voters/turnout		130,307	86.19
PFP hold			
Source: Commission on Elections

=== Provincial Board ===
Since Quirino's reclassification as a 1st class province in 2025, the Quirino Provincial Board is composed of 14 board members, 10 of whom are elected.

The Partido Federal ng Pilipinas won seven seats, becoming the largest party in the provincial board.

Party	Votes	%	Seats	+/–
Partido Federal ng Pilipinas	193,360	56.65	7	New
PDP–Laban	24,982	7.32	0	–2
Nationalist People's Coalition	23,749	6.96	1	0
Independent	99,250	29.08	2	+1
Total	341,341	100.00	10	+2
Total votes	112,310	–		
Registered voters/turnout	130,307	86.19		
Source: Commission on Elections

==== 1st district ====
Quirino's 1st provincial district consists of the municipalities of Cabarroguis, Diffun and Saguday. Five board members are elected by this provincial district.

Seven candidates were included in the ballot.

Candidate	Party	Votes	%
Lilybeth Yogyog	Independent	34,796	19.75
Babylyn Reyes (incumbent)	Partido Federal ng Pilipinas	29,348	16.66
Marlo Guillermo (incumbent)	Partido Federal ng Pilipinas	29,312	16.64
Martin Bulayo Sr.	Nationalist People's Coalition	23,749	13.48
Roseller Escobar	Partido Federal ng Pilipinas	22,484	12.76
Willard Abuan	Independent	21,537	12.22
Michael Lidiang	Independent	14,961	8.49
Total		176,187	100.00
Total votes		55,939	–
Registered voters/turnout		65,588	85.29
Source: Commission on Elections

==== 2nd district ====
Quirino's 2nd provincial district consists of the municipalities of Aglipay, Maddela and Nagtipunan. Five board members are elected by this provincial district.

Six candidates were included in the ballot.

Candidate	Party	Votes	%
Linda Dacmay (incumbent)	Partido Federal ng Pilipinas	29,613	17.93
Tomas Baccac	Partido Federal ng Pilipinas	29,053	17.59
Celso Albano	Independent	27,956	16.93
Roy Saladino (incumbent)	Partido Federal ng Pilipinas	27,600	16.71
Alegre Ylanan (incumbent)	Partido Federal ng Pilipinas	25,950	15.71
Melanie Batara	PDP–Laban	24,982	15.13
Total		165,154	100.00
Total votes		56,371	–
Registered voters/turnout		64,719	87.10
Source: Commission on Elections

== Santiago ==
=== Mayor ===
Incumbent Mayor Sheena Tan of Lakas–CMD ran for a second term. She was previously affiliated with PDP–Laban.

Tan won re-election against Otep Miranda (Aksyon Demokratiko) and city councilor Arlene Alvarez-Reyes (Nationalist People's Coalition).

Candidate	Party	Votes	%
Sheena Tan (incumbent)	Lakas–CMD	68,743	71.88
Otep Miranda	Aksyon Demokratiko	19,208	20.08
Arlene Alvarez-Reyes	Nationalist People's Coalition	7,690	8.04
Total		95,641	100.00
Valid votes		95,641	98.07
Invalid/blank votes		1,887	1.93
Total votes		97,528	100.00
Registered voters/turnout		115,767	84.25
Lakas hold			
Source: Commission on Elections

=== Vice Mayor ===
Incumbent Vice Mayor Alvin Abaya of the PDP–Laban is term-limited.

PDP–Laban nominated Gene Jose, who was defeated by city councilor Jamayne Tan of Lakas–CMD. City councilor Jigs Miranda (Aksyon Demokratiko) and two other candidates also ran for vice mayor.

Candidate	Party	Votes	%
Jamayne Tan	Lakas–CMD	48,292	53.56
Jigs Miranda	Aksyon Demokratiko	26,618	29.52
Maximin Navarro	Nationalist People's Coalition	14,601	16.19
Kit Galang	Independent	505	0.56
Gene Jose	PDP–Laban	153	0.17
Total		90,169	100.00
Valid votes		90,169	92.45
Invalid/blank votes		7,359	7.55
Total votes		97,528	100.00
Registered voters/turnout		115,767	84.25
Lakas gain from PDP–Laban			
Source: Commission on Elections

=== City Council ===
The Santiago City Council is composed of 13 councilors, 10 of whom are elected.

35 candidates were included in the ballot.

Lakas–CMD won nine seats, gaining a majority in the city council.

Party	Votes	%	Seats	+/–
Lakas–CMD	421,843	59.37	9	+8
Aksyon Demokratiko	75,034	10.56	1	0
Nationalist People's Coalition	73,371	10.33	0	0
Liberal Party	32,205	4.53	0	–2
PDP–Laban	6,266	0.88	0	–6
Partido Federal ng Pilipinas	1,004	0.14	0	0
Independent	100,812	14.19	0	0
Total	710,535	100.00	10	0
Total votes	97,528	–		
Registered voters/turnout	115,767	84.25		
Source: Commission on Elections

Candidate	Party	Votes	%
Eunice Sable (incumbent)	Lakas–CMD	52,085	7.33
Pia Bautista	Lakas–CMD	50,576	7.12
Sherman Miguel (incumbent)	Lakas–CMD	50,566	7.12
Anton Abaya	Lakas–CMD	49,106	6.91
Jomae de Jesus	Lakas–CMD	41,699	5.87
RC Co	Aksyon Demokratiko	40,787	5.74
Russel Ponce	Lakas–CMD	39,428	5.55
Gino Abaya Siquian	Lakas–CMD	39,293	5.53
Carlo de Luna	Lakas–CMD	37,674	5.30
Olan Chan (incumbent)	Lakas–CMD	34,004	4.79
Pandong Lugod	Lakas–CMD	27,412	3.86
Michael de Jesus	Independent	27,160	3.82
Jun Cabucana (incumbent)	Liberal Party	26,429	3.72
Aysen Marrero	Nationalist People's Coalition	24,864	3.50
Vinchy Aggabao	Independent	24,479	3.45
Soc Navarro	Independent	16,784	2.36
Kay Perez	Nationalist People's Coalition	15,112	2.13
Pempe Miranda	Independent	13,345	1.88
Lessa Sarangaya	Nationalist People's Coalition	12,552	1.77
Aga Castillo	Nationalist People's Coalition	11,354	1.60
Gibet Chan	Aksyon Demokratiko	11,131	1.57
Mark Sotto	Nationalist People's Coalition	9,489	1.34
Aliyah Aggabao	Aksyon Demokratiko	6,668	0.94
Poklet Capun-an	Aksyon Demokratiko	6,147	0.87
Hubert Taguinod	Liberal Party	5,776	0.81
Boni Bartolome	Aksyon Demokratiko	5,663	0.80
Monching Sarangaya	Independent	4,912	0.69
Eric Salcedo	Aksyon Demokratiko	4,638	0.65
Iver Cacatian Barangan	Independent	4,522	0.64
Michael Dungo	Independent	4,224	0.59
Marlon Miranda	Independent	3,754	0.53
Neth Jose	PDP–Laban	3,321	0.47
Jayson Sanchez	PDP–Laban	2,945	0.41
King Umaguing	Independent	1,632	0.23
Louie Castriciones	Partido Federal ng Pilipinas	1,004	0.14
Total		710,535	100.00
Total votes		97,528	–
Registered voters/turnout		115,767	84.25
Source: Commission on Elections

== Election-related incidents ==
On February 11, 2025, three people were arrested for trying to extort ₱90 million (US$1.83 million) from two municipal candidates in Enrile, Cagayan by claiming to be COMELEC-connected IT specialists who could rig the election results in their favor. On February 28, COMELEC filed cybercrime charges against vice-mayoral candidate Jeryll Harold Respicio in Reina Mercedes, Isabela, after he posted a video on social media appearing to demonstrate a method on how to tamper with the election results. After he won the election, Comelec suspended his proclamation until June 2.

On April 23, Joel Ruma, the reelectionist mayor of Rizal, Cagayan, was shot dead by a suspected sniper while campaigning, with three people injured in the same incident. On April 26, a candidate for councilor in San Pablo, Isabela was shot and injured along with two companions in an ambush.
