= 2025 Cagayan local elections =

Elections in the Philippine province

- May 12, 2025
- Gubernatorial election
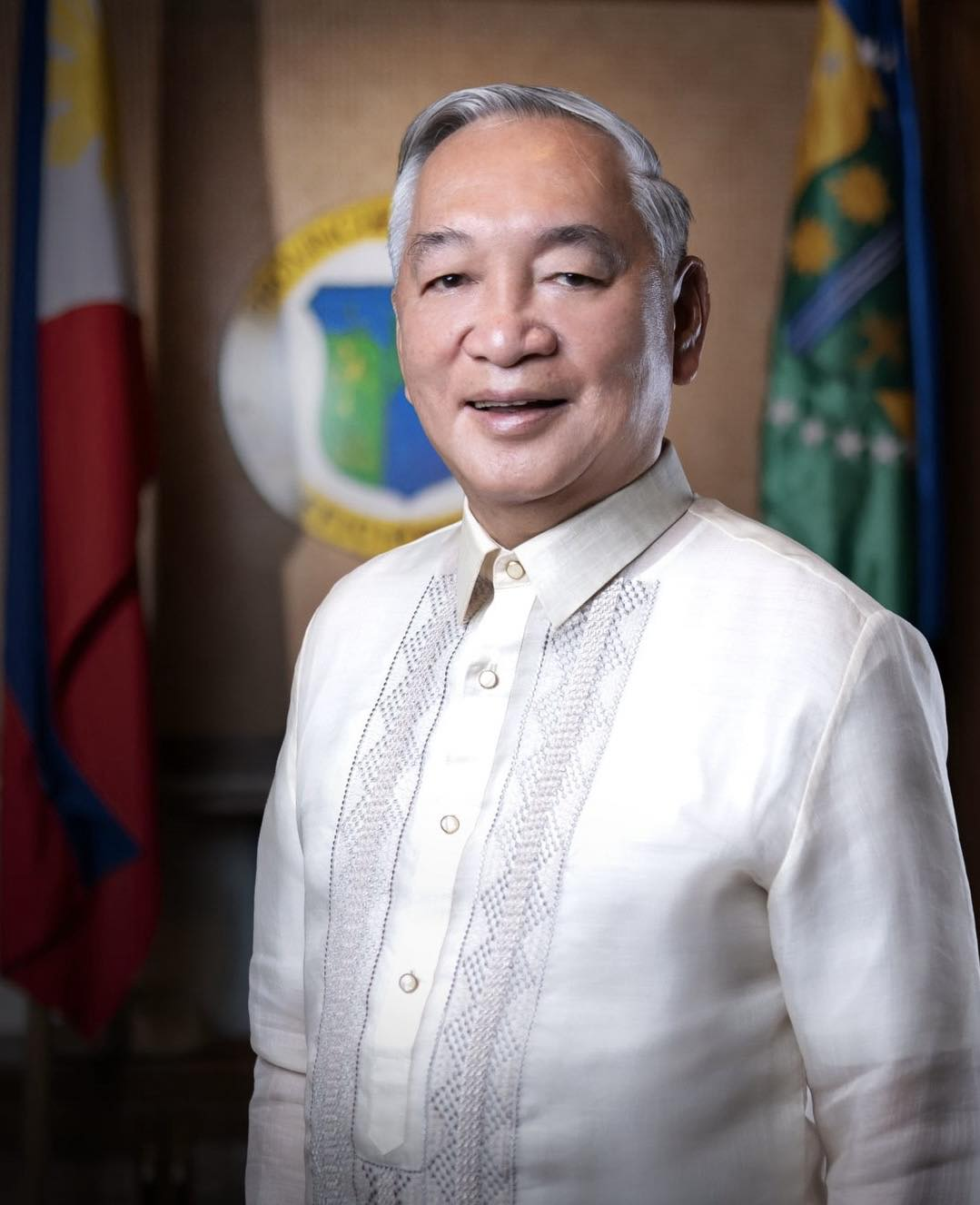

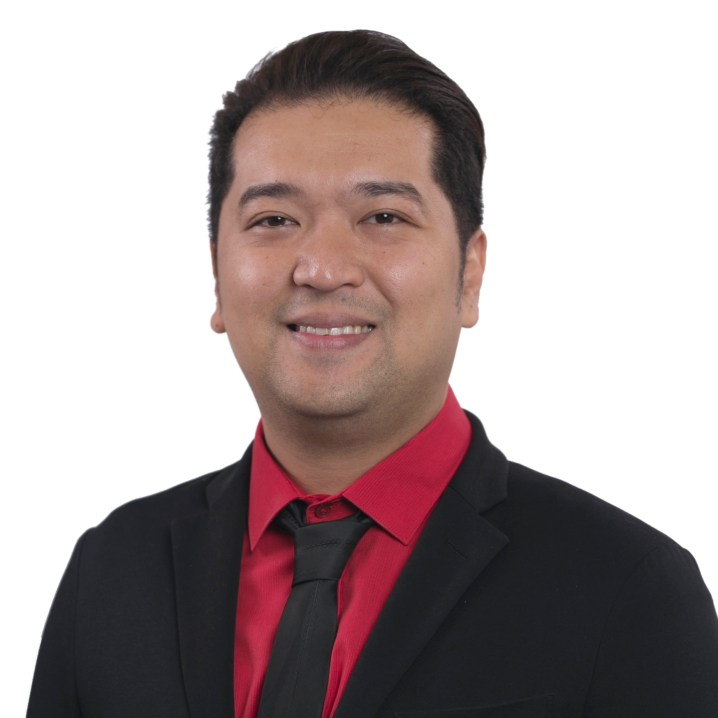
| | | NPC |
| Candidate | Edgar Aglipay | Zarah Lara | Melvin Vargas Jr. |
| Party | Nacionalista | NPC | PFP |
| Running mate | Manuel Mamba | Odi Fausto | Alvaro Antonio |
| Popular vote | 258,470 | 231,041 | 149,475 |
| Percentage | 40.45 | 36.16 | 23.39 |
Governor before election
Manuel Mamba
Nacionalista
Elected Governor
Edgar Aglipay
Nacionalista
- Vice gubernatorial election
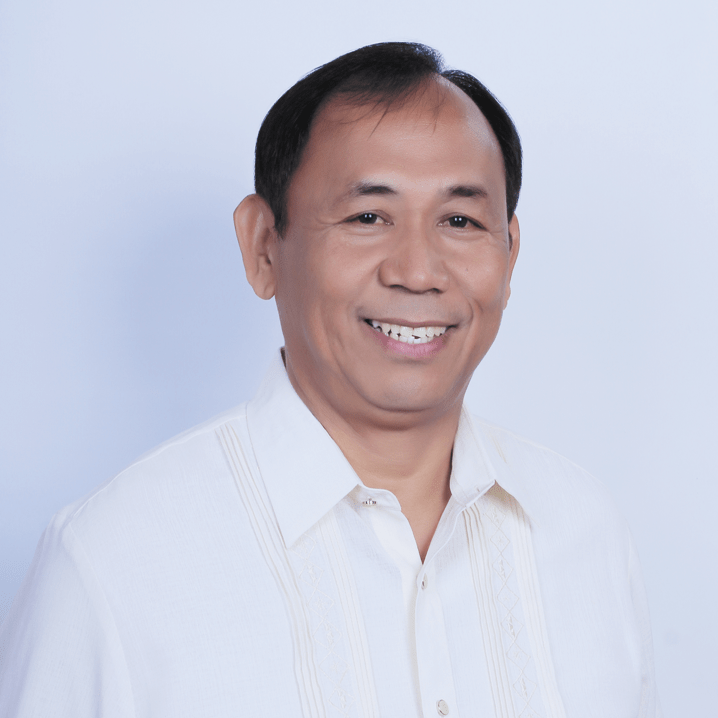

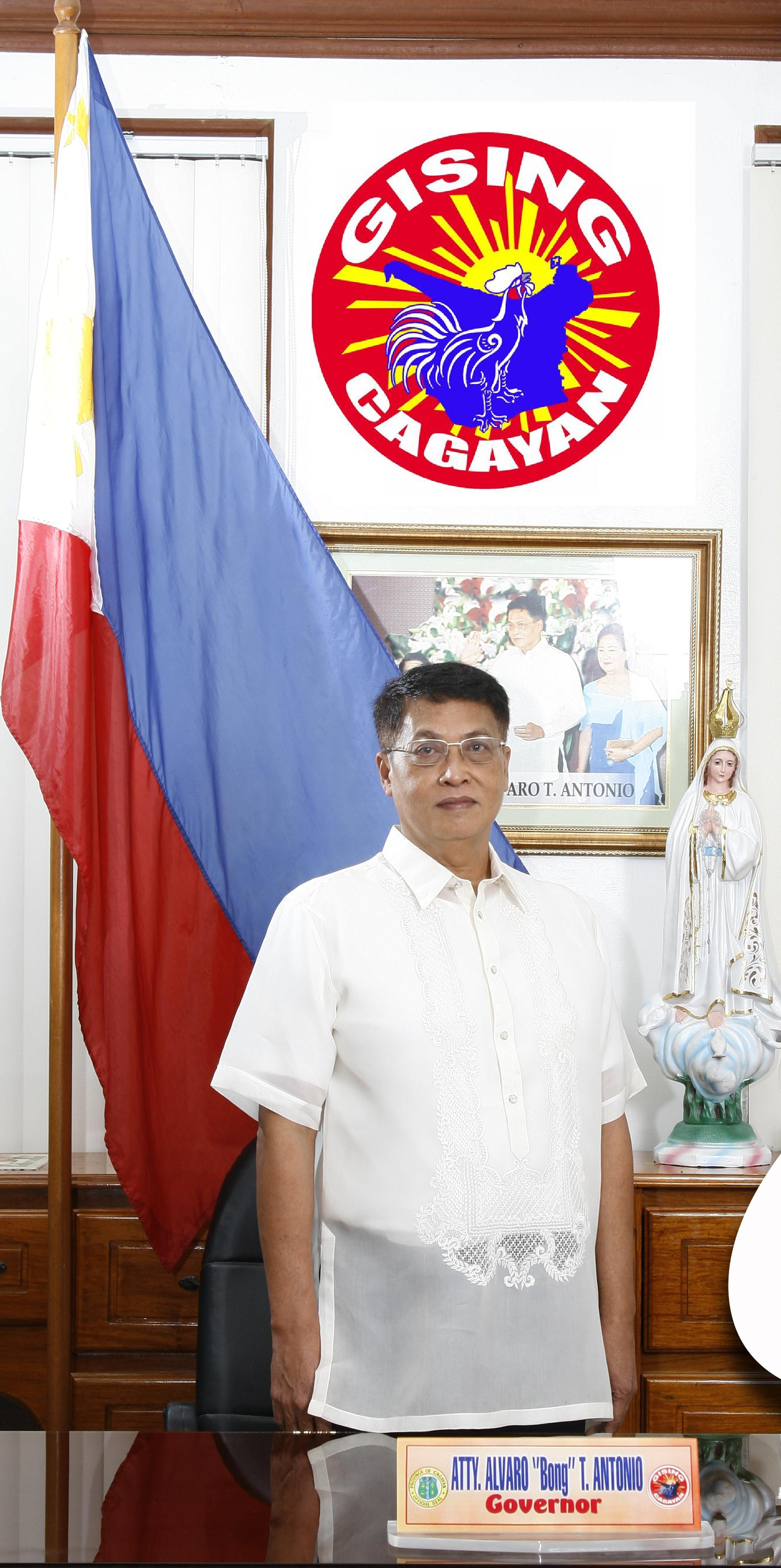
| | | NPC |
| Candidate | Manuel Mamba | Odi Fausto | Alvaro Antonio |
| Party | Nacionalista | NPC | PFP |
| Popular vote | 348,954 | 130,980 | 119,734 |
| Percentage | 58.19 | 21.84 | 19.97 |
Vice Governor before election
Melvin Vargas Jr.
Independent
Elected Vice Governor
Manuel Mamba
Nacionalista
- Provincial Board election
- 10 out of 13 seats in the Cagayan Provincial Board; 7 seats needed for a majority
| Party | Current seats |
|---|---|
| Lakas | 5 |
| Nacionalista | 2 |
| NPC | 2 |

Local elections were held in Cagayan on May 12, 2025, as part of the 2025 Philippine general election. Cagayan voters elected a governor, a vice governor, and 10 out of 13 members of the Cagayan Provincial Board.

== Governor ==
Term-limited incumbent Manuel Mamba (Nacionalista Party) is running for vice governor of Cagayan. Manuel was re-elected with 52.02% of the vote in 2022.

=== Candidates ===
The following candidates are included in the ballot:

| No. | Candidate | Party |
|---|---|---|
| 1 | Edgar Aglipay | Nacionalista Party |
| 2 | Zarah Lara | Nationalist People's Coalition |
| 3 | Melvin Vargas Jr. | Independent |

=== Results ===
| Candidate | Party | Votes | % |
|---|---|---|---|
| Edgar Aglipay | Nacionalista Party | 258,470 | 40.45 |
| Zarah Lara | Nationalist People's Coalition | 231,041 | 36.16 |
| Melvin Vargas Jr. | Independent | 149,475 | 23.39 |
| Total | | 638,986 | 100.00 |

== Vice governor ==
Term-limited incumbent Melvin Vargas Jr. (Independent) is running for governor of Cagayan. Vargas was re-elected under PDP–Laban with 34.94% of the vote in 2022.

=== Candidates ===
The following candidates are included in the ballot:

| No. | Candidate | Party |
|---|---|---|
| 1 | Alvaro Antonio | Partido Federal ng Pilipinas |
| 2 | Odi Fausto | Nationalist People's Coalition |
| 3 | Manuel Mamba | Nacionalista Party |

=== Results ===
| Candidate | Party | Votes | % |
|---|---|---|---|
| Manuel Mamba | Nacionalista Party | 348,954 | 58.19 |
| Odi Fausto | Nationalist People's Coalition | 130,980 | 21.84 |
| Alvaro Antonio | Partido Federal ng Pilipinas | 119,734 | 19.97 |
| Total | | 599,668 | 100.00 |

== Provincial Board ==
The Cagayan Provincial Board is composed of 13 board members, 10 of whom are elected.

=== Retiring and term-limited board members ===
The following board members are retiring:

- Odi Fausto (Nationalist People's Coalition, 3rd provincial district), running for vice governor of Cagayan
- Oliver Pascual (Nacionalista Party, 1st provincial district), running for mayor of Lal-lo
- Mila Catabay-Lauigan (Nationalist People's Coalition, 3rd provincial district)

The following board members are term-limited:

- Rodrigo de Asis (Nacionalista Party), 3rd provincial district) running for Councilor in Solana, Cagayan
- Archie Layus (Lakas–CMD, 2nd provincial district) running for Vice Mayor in Claveria, Cagayan
- Ross Resuello (Lakas–CMD, 3rd provincial district), running for vice mayor of Tuguegarao

=== Overview ===
| Party | Votes | % | Seats |
|---|---|---|---|
| Lakas–CMD | 644,366 | 41.33 | 7 |
| Nacionalista Party | 564,055 | 36.18 | 3 |
| Nationalist People's Coalition | 130,891 | 8.39 | 0 |
| Liberal Party | 65,279 | 4.19 | 0 |
| Aksyon Demokratiko | 45,006 | 2.89 | 0 |
| Independent | 109,604 | 7.03 | 0 |
| Ex officio seats | | | 3 |
| Total | 1,559,201 | 100.00 | 13 |

=== 1st provincial district ===
Cagayan's 1st provincial district consists of the same area as Cagayan's 1st legislative district. Three board members are elected from this provincial district.

==== Candidates ====
The following candidates are included in the ballot:

| No. | Candidate | Party |
|---|---|---|
| 1 | Joaquin Agatep Jr. | Independent |
| 2 | Joan Cabildo-Dunuan | Nacionalista Party |
| 3 | Reymar Desiderio | Independent |
| 4 | Romeo Garcia (incumbent) | Nacionalista Party |
| 5 | Hang Liggayu | Aksyon Demokratiko |
| 6 | Kamille Ponce (incumbent) | Lakas–CMD |
| 7 | Bong Ramos | Nationalist People's Coalition |
| 8 | Weng Retoma | Lakas–CMD |
| 9 | Red Sac | Nacionalista Party |

==== Results ====
| Candidate | Party | Votes | % |
|---|---|---|---|
| Weng Retoma | Lakas–CMD | 97,230 | 20.90 |
| Kamille Ponce (incumbent) | Lakas–CMD | 87,057 | 18.72 |
| Romeo Garcia (incumbent) | Nacionalista Party | 80,533 | 17.31 |
| Bong Ramos | Nationalist People's Coalition | 47,126 | 10.13 |
| Joan Cabildo-Dunuan | Nacionalista Party | 45,214 | 9.72 |
| Hang Liggayu | Aksyon Demokratiko | 45,006 | 9.68 |
| Red Sac | Nacionalista Party | 34,195 | 7.35 |
| Joaquin Agatep Jr. | Independent | 21,097 | 4.54 |
| Reymar Desiderio | Independent | 7,699 | 1.66 |
| Total | | 465,157 | 100.00 |

=== 2nd provincial district ===
Cagayan's 2nd provincial district consists of the same area as Cagayan's 2nd legislative district. Three board members are elected from this provincial district.

==== Candidates ====
The following candidates are included in the ballot:

| No. | Candidate | Party |
|---|---|---|
| 1 | Wilfredo Aguinaldo II | Independent |
| 2 | Raquel dela Cruz | Nacionalista Party |
| 3 | Arvin Garcia | Nationalist People's Coalition |
| 4 | Lalaine Pamittan | Nacionalista Party |
| 5 | Marites Tacipit | Independent |
| 6 | Jose Tayawa | Nacionalista Party |
| 7 | Kevin Timbas (incumbent) | Lakas–CMD |
| 8 | Randy Ursulum (incumbent) | Lakas–CMD |
| 9 | Vilmer Viloria | Lakas–CMD |

==== Results ====
| Candidate | Party | Votes | % |
|---|---|---|---|
| Randy Ursulum (incumbent) | Lakas–CMD | 98,159 | 25.41 |
| Kevin Timbas (incumbent) | Lakas–CMD | 69,762 | 18.06 |
| Vilmer Viloria | Lakas–CMD | 68,894 | 17.83 |
| Lalaine Pamittan | Nacionalista Party | 41,348 | 10.70 |
| Jose Tayawa | Nacionalista Party | 36,597 | 9.47 |
| Raquel dela Cruz | Nacionalista Party | 32,604 | 8.44 |
| Arvin Garcia | Nationalist People's Coalition | 14,523 | 3.76 |
| Marites Tacipit | Independent | 14,480 | 3.75 |
| Wilfredo Aguinaldo II | Independent | 9,983 | 2.58 |
| Total | | 386,350 | 100.00 |

=== 3rd provincial district ===
Cagayan's 3rd provincial district consists of the same area as Cagayan's 3rd legislative district. Four board members are elected from this provincial district.

==== Candidates ====
The following candidates are included in the ballot:

| No. | Candidate | Party |
|---|---|---|
| 1 | Santi Balisi | Independent |
| 2 | Aldrin Bargado | Independent |
| 3 | Claire Callangan | Nationalist People's Coalition |
| 4 | Jojo Caronan | Nacionalista Party |
| 5 | Romar de Asis | Nacionalista Party |
| 6 | Odiboy Fausto | Lakas–CMD |
| 7 | Raymund Guzman | Nacionalista Party |
| 8 | Gilbert Labang | Independent |
| 9 | Pearl Mabasa | Nacionalista Party |
| 10 | Marj Martin | Liberal Party |
| 11 | Phil Pattaguan | Lakas–CMD |
| 12 | AJ Ponce | Lakas–CMD |

==== Results ====
| Candidate | Party | Votes | % |
|---|---|---|---|
| AJ Ponce | Lakas–CMD | 117,055 | 16.54 |
| Jojo Caronan | Nacionalista Party | 89,092 | 12.59 |
| Romar de Asis | Nacionalista Party | 82,879 | 11.71 |
| Odiboy Fausto | Lakas–CMD | 73,286 | 10.36 |
| Raymund Guzman | Nacionalista Party | 73,282 | 10.36 |
| Claire Callangan | Nationalist People's Coalition | 69,242 | 9.78 |
| Marj Martin | Liberal Party | 65,279 | 9.22 |
| Pearl Mabasa | Nacionalista Party | 48,311 | 6.83 |
| Gilbert Labang | Independent | 41,239 | 5.83 |
| Phil Pattaguan | Lakas–CMD | 32,923 | 4.65 |
| Santi Balisi | Independent | 8,617 | 1.22 |
| Aldrin Bargado | Independent | 6,489 | 0.92 |
| Total | | 707,694 | 100.00 |

== Election-related incidents ==
In February 11, 2025, three people were arrested for trying to extort ₱90 million (US$1.83 million) from two municipal candidates in Enrile by claiming to be COMELEC-connected IT specialists who could rig the election results in their favor.

On April 23, Joel Ruma, the reelectionist mayor of Rizal, was shot dead by a suspected sniper while campaigning, with three people injured in the same incident.
