= 2022 Philippine local elections in Cagayan Valley =

- May 9, 2022
- Gubernatorial elections
- 5 provincial governors and 1 city mayor
Party	Seats	+/–
Nacionalista	2	+1
PDP–Laban	2	−1
Liberal	1	0
PDDS	1	+1
This lists parties that won seats. See the complete results below.
- Vice gubernatorial elections
- 5 provincial vice governors and 1 city vice mayor
Party	Seats	+/–
PDP–Laban	4	+1
Lakas	1	New
Liberal	1	0
This lists parties that won seats. See the complete results below.
- Provincial Board elections
- 46 provincial board members and 10 city councilors
Party	Seats	+/–
PDP–Laban	12	−13
Lakas	10	+10
Nacionalista	8	−1
Liberal	6	+2
NPC	6	0
Aksyon	4	New
PFP	2	0
Reporma	2	New
LDP	1	New
Independent	5	+2
This lists parties that won seats. See the complete results below.

The 2022 Philippine local elections in Cagayan Valley were held on May 9, 2022.

== Summary ==
=== Governors ===
Province/city	Incumbent	Incumbent's party	Winner	Winner's party	Winning margin
Batanes	Marilou Cayco	Liberal	Marilou Cayco	Liberal	22.08%
Cagayan	Manuel Mamba	Nacionalista	Manuel Mamba	Nacionalista	4.04%
Isabela	Rodolfo Albano III	PDP–Laban	Rodolfo Albano III	PDP–Laban	91.48%
Nueva Vizcaya	Carlos Padilla	Nacionalista	Carlos Padilla	Nacionalista	18.96%
Quirino	Dakila Cua	PDDS	Dakila Cua	PDDS	63.30%
Santiago (ICC)	Joseph Tan	PDP–Laban	Sheena Tan	PDP–Laban	0.89%

=== Vice governors ===
Province/city	Incumbent	Incumbent's party	Winner	Winner's party	Winning margin
Batanes	Ignacio Villa	Liberal	Ignacio Villa	Liberal	6.50%
Cagayan	Melvin Vargas Jr.	PDP–Laban	Melvin Vargas Jr.	PDP–Laban	1.84%
Isabela	Faustino Dy III	PDP–Laban	Faustino Dy III	PDP–Laban	Unopposed
Nueva Vizcaya	Tam-an Tomas	PRP	Jose Gambito	Lakas	9.52%
Quirino	Jojo Vaquilar	PDP–Laban	Jojo Vaquilar	PDP–Laban	31.54%
Santiago (ICC)	Alvin Abaya	PDP–Laban	Alvin Abaya	PDP–Laban	8.72%

=== Provincial boards ===
Province/city	Seats	Party control		Composition
Province/city	Seats	Previous	Result	Composition
Batanes	6 elected 4 ex-officio	No majority	No majority	Liberal (3); NPC (1); Reporma (1); Independent (1)
Cagayan	10 elected 3 ex-officio	No majority	No majority	Lakas (3); NPC (2); Nacionalista (1); PDP–Laban (1); Independent (3)
Isabela	12 elected 7 ex-officio	No majority	No majority	PDP–Laban (3); Lakas (2); Aksyon (2); NPC (2); LDP (1); Nacionalista (1); PFP (1)
Nueva Vizcaya	10 elected 4 ex-officio	No majority	No majority	Nacionalista (4); Lakas (4); Aksyon (1); PFP (1)
Quirino	8 elected 4 ex-officio	PDP–Laban	No majority	PDP–Laban (2); Nacionalista (2); NPC (1); Reporma (1); Liberal (1); Independent (1)
Santiago (ICC)	10 elected 3 ex-officio	PDP–Laban	No majority	PDP–Laban (6); Liberal (2); Aksyon (1); Lakas (1)

== Batanes ==
=== Governor ===
Incumbent Governor Marilou Cayco of the Liberal Party ran for a third term.

Cayco won re-election against former Batanes governor Telesforo Castillejos (Nationalist People's Coalition).

Candidate	Party	Votes	%
Marilou Cayco (incumbent)	Liberal Party	6,489	61.04
Telesforo Castillejos	Nationalist People's Coalition	4,142	38.96
Total		10,631	100.00
Total votes		11,801	–
Registered voters/turnout		13,820	85.39
Liberal hold			
Source: Commission on Elections

=== Vice Governor ===
Incumbent Vice Governor Ignacio Villa of the Liberal Party ran for a second term.

Villa won re-election against provincial board member Ferdie Elica (Nationalist People's Coalition), Ivana mayor Ading Hostallero (Lakas–CMD) and provincial board member Juliet Abas (Partido para sa Demokratikong Reporma).

Candidate	Party	Votes	%
Ignacio Villa (incumbent)	Liberal Party	3,580	33.10
Ferdie Elica	Nationalist People's Coalition	2,877	26.60
Ading Hostallero	Lakas–CMD	2,479	22.92
Juliet Abas	Partido para sa Demokratikong Reporma	1,881	17.39
Total		10,817	100.00
Total votes		11,801	–
Registered voters/turnout		13,820	85.39
Liberal hold			
Source: Commission on Elections

=== Provincial Board ===
The Batanes Provincial Board consists of 10 board members, 6 of whom are elected.

The Liberal Party won three seats, becoming the largest party in the provincial board.

Party	Votes	%	Seats	+/–
Liberal Party	10,089	35.10	3	0
Nationalist People's Coalition	7,324	25.48	1	–2
Partido para sa Demokratikong Reporma	6,242	21.72	1	New
Lakas–CMD	5,085	17.69	1	New
Total	28,740	100.00	6	0
Total votes	11,801	–		
Registered voters/turnout	13,820	85.39		

==== 1st district ====
Batanes's 1st provincial district consists of the municipalities of Basco and Mahatao. Three board members are elected from this provincial district.

11 candidates were included in the ballot.

Candidate	Party	Votes	%
Roel Nicolas	Liberal Party	3,188	19.27
Ann Viola	Liberal Party	2,730	16.50
Juan Redondo (incumbent)	Nationalist People's Coalition	1,928	11.65
Alexander Argonza	Nationalist People's Coalition	1,860	11.24
Rock Abad	Partido para sa Demokratikong Reporma	1,745	10.55
Benni Asa	Partido para sa Demokratikong Reporma	1,405	8.49
Winnie Martin	Lakas–CMD	1,034	6.25
Roldan Cabizon	Nationalist People's Coalition	795	4.80
Jul Balasbas	Lakas–CMD	684	4.13
Arsing Viola	Lakas–CMD	643	3.89
Guillermo Bongay	Partido para sa Demokratikong Reporma	536	3.24
Total		16,548	100.00
Total votes		6,602	–
Registered voters/turnout		7,824	84.38
Source: Commission on Elections

==== 2nd district ====
Batanes's 2nd provincial district consists of the municipalities of Itbayat, Ivana, Sabtang and Uyugan. Three board members are elected from this provincial district.

10 candidates were included in the ballot.

Candidate	Party	Votes	%
Byron Peralta	Lakas–CMD	1,529	12.54
Juliet Cataluña (incumbent)	Liberal Party	1,493	12.25
Roland Cabitac	Partido para sa Demokratikong Reporma	1,423	11.67
Precy Rivera	Liberal Party	1,375	11.28
Priscilla Nanud	Liberal Party	1,303	10.69
Rogelio Delapa	Lakas–CMD	1,195	9.80
Marilys Castillo	Nationalist People's Coalition	1,145	9.39
Romeo Acebes (incumbent)	Partido para sa Demokratikong Reporma	1,133	9.29
Hedrick Cervillon	Nationalist People's Coalition	936	7.68
Juanita Acacio	Nationalist People's Coalition	660	5.41
Total		12,192	100.00
Total votes		5,199	–
Registered voters/turnout		5,996	86.71
Source: Commission on Elections

== Cagayan ==
=== Governor ===
Incumbent Governor Manuel Mamba of the Nacionalista Party ran for a third term. He was previously an independent.

Mamba won re-election against Zarah Pulsar Lara (PDP–Laban), wife of representative Joseph Lara.

Candidate	Party	Votes	%
Manuel Mamba (incumbent)	Nacionalista Party	302,025	52.02
Zarah Pulsar Lara	PDP–Laban	278,562	47.98
Total		580,587	100.00
Total votes		653,635	–
Registered voters/turnout		766,018	85.33
Nacionalista hold			
Source: Commission on Elections

=== Vice Governor ===
Incumbent Vice Governor Melvin Vargas Jr. of PDP–Laban ran for a third term. He was previously affiliated with the United Nationalist Alliance.

Vargas won re-election against provincial board member AJ Ponce (Nationalist People's Coalition), Manuel Mamba's nephew Francisco Mamba III (Nacionalista Party) and provincial board member Perla Tumaliuan (Partido Federal ng Pilipinas).

Candidate	Party	Votes	%
Melvin Vargas Jr. (incumbent)	PDP–Laban	197,611	34.94
AJ Ponce	Nationalist People's Coalition	187,191	33.10
Francisco Mamba III	Nacionalista Party	141,761	25.07
Perla Tumaliuan	Partido Federal ng Pilipinas	38,935	6.89
Total		565,498	100.00
Total votes		653,635	–
Registered voters/turnout		766,018	85.33
PDP–Laban hold			
Source: Commission on Elections

=== Provincial Board ===
The Cagayan Provincial Board is composed of 13 board members, 10 of whom are elected.

Lakas–CMD won three seats, becoming the largest party in the provincial board.

Party	Votes	%	Seats	+/–
Nacionalista Party	226,588	16.66	1	New
Nationalist People's Coalition	206,414	15.18	2	+2
Lakas–CMD	189,305	13.92	3	New
PDP–Laban	127,966	9.41	1	–4
United Nationalist Alliance	47,751	3.51	0	0
Partido Federal ng Pilipinas	34,970	2.57	0	0
Independent	526,681	38.74	3	+2
Total	1,359,675	100.00	10	0
Total votes	653,635	–		
Registered voters/turnout	766,018	85.33		

==== 1st district ====
Cagayan's 1st provincial district consists of the same area as Cagayan's 1st legislative district. Three board members are elected from this provincial district.

10 candidates were included in the ballot.

Candidate	Party	Votes	%
Oliver Pascual	PDP–Laban	92,526	21.68
Kamille Ponce	Nationalist People's Coalition	72,226	16.92
Romeo Garcia	Nacionalista Party	64,035	15.00
Dadang Antonio	United Nationalist Alliance	47,751	11.19
Teena Baclig	PDP–Laban	35,440	8.30
Alexander Pagulayan	Nationalist People's Coalition	34,059	7.98
Bong Padilla	Nacionalista Party	32,391	7.59
Lina Go	Nacionalista Party	24,467	5.73
Reymar Desiderio	Partido Federal ng Pilipinas	14,860	3.48
Manuel Rosete	Independent	9,083	2.13
Total		426,838	100.00
Total votes		233,283	–
Registered voters/turnout		271,961	85.78
Source: Commission on Elections

==== 2nd district ====
Cagayan's 2nd provincial district consists of the same area as Cagayan's 2nd legislative district. Three board members are elected from this provincial district.

10 candidates were included in the ballot.

Candidate	Party	Votes	%
Randy Ursulum	Lakas–CMD	78,852	22.45
Archie Layus (incumbent)	Lakas–CMD	59,976	17.08
Kevin Timbas	Lakas–CMD	50,477	14.37
Al Llopis (incumbent)	Nacionalista Party	48,022	13.67
Carmelo Villacete	Nacionalista Party	47,481	13.52
Edwin Guillermo	Independent	24,399	6.95
Roger Paz Jr.	Partido Federal ng Pilipinas	20,110	5.73
Cadel Trilles	Nacionalista Party	10,192	2.90
Bong Leonador	Independent	9,012	2.57
Fernando Asperela	Independent	2,689	0.77
Total		351,210	100.00
Total votes		175,143	–
Registered voters/turnout		209,121	83.75
Source: Commission on Elections

==== 3rd district ====
Cagayan's 3rd provincial district consists of the same area as Cagayan's 3rd legislative district. Four board members are elected from this provincial district.

Seven candidates were included in the ballot.

Candidate	Party	Votes	%
Ross Resuello (incumbent)	Independent	131,509	22.61
Rodrigo de Asis (incumbent)	Independent	110,725	19.04
Mila Catabay-Lauigan (incumbent)	Nationalist People's Coalition	100,129	17.22
Leonides Fausto	Independent	86,341	14.84
Kiko Kanapi	Independent	60,944	10.48
Leonard Beltran	Independent	60,104	10.33
Clarita Lunas	Independent	31,875	5.48
Total		581,627	100.00
Total votes		245,209	–
Registered voters/turnout		284,936	86.06
Source: Commission on Elections

== Isabela ==
=== Governor ===
Incumbent Governor Rodolfo Albano III of PDP–Laban ran for a second term.

Albano won re-election against two other candidates.

Candidate	Party	Votes	%
Rodolfo Albano III (incumbent)	PDP–Laban	673,774	95.17
Glorieta Almazan	Independent	26,115	3.69
Romeo Carlos	Philippine Green Republican Party	8,101	1.14
Total		707,990	100.00
Total votes		835,578	–
Registered voters/turnout		1,001,573	83.43
PDP–Laban hold			
Source: Commission on Elections (Note: Total votes and registered voters from Santiago are excluded as the city's voters are ineligible to vote for provincial officials in Isabela.)

=== Vice Governor ===
Incumbent Vice Governor Faustino Dy III of PDP–Laban won re-election for a second term unopposed.

Candidate	Party	Votes	%
Faustino Dy III (incumbent)	PDP–Laban	632,938	100.00
Total		632,938	100.00
Total votes		835,578	–
Registered voters/turnout		1,001,573	83.43
PDP–Laban hold			
Source: Commission on Elections

=== Provincial Board ===
The Isabela Provincial Board is composed of 19 board members, 12 of whom are elected.

PDP–Laban won three seats, remaining as the largest party in the provincial board.

Party	Votes	%	Seats	+/–
Lakas–CMD	236,679	22.54	2	New
Aksyon Demokratiko	207,730	19.78	2	New
Nationalist People's Coalition	169,821	16.17	2	0
PDP–Laban	165,891	15.80	3	–2
Laban ng Demokratikong Pilipino	75,490	7.19	1	New
Nacionalista Party	57,289	5.45	1	–2
Partido Federal ng Pilipinas	53,078	5.05	1	–1
Kilusang Bagong Lipunan	31,249	2.98	0	New
Liberal Party	18,069	1.72	0	New
Partido para sa Demokratikong Reporma	9,213	0.88	0	New
PROMDI	5,932	0.56	0	New
Independent	19,821	1.89	0	0
Total	1,050,262	100.00	12	0
Total votes	835,578	–		
Registered voters/turnout	1,001,573	83.43		

==== 1st district ====
Isabela's 1st provincial district consists of the same area as Isabela's 1st legislative district. Two board members are elected from this provincial district.

Four candidates were included in the ballot.

Candidate	Party	Votes	%
Delfinito Albano (incumbent)	Lakas–CMD	152,807	60.90
Jon Anes (incumbent)	Lakas–CMD	83,872	33.43
Marcelo Artizuela Sr.	Independent	8,288	3.30
Celso Balayan	PROMDI	5,932	2.36
Total		250,899	100.00
Total votes		212,416	–
Registered voters/turnout		259,291	81.92
Source: Commission on Elections

==== 2nd district ====
Isabela's 2nd provincial district consists of the same area as Isabela's 2nd legislative district. Two board members are elected from this provincial district.

Four candidates were included in the ballot.

Candidate	Party	Votes	%
Ed Christian Go (incumbent)	Aksyon Demokratiko	78,685	55.70
Edgar Capuchino (incumbent)	Nacionalista Party	57,289	40.56
Manny Pua	Kilusang Bagong Lipunan	3,208	2.27
Romarico Ramirez	Kilusang Bagong Lipunan	2,077	1.47
Total		141,259	100.00
Total votes		107,078	–
Registered voters/turnout		126,619	84.57
Source: Commission on Elections

==== 3rd district ====
Isabela's 3rd provincial district consists of the same area as Isabela's 3rd legislative district. Two board members are elected from this provincial district.

Four candidates were included in the ballot.

Candidate	Party	Votes	%
Grace Arreola	Nationalist People's Coalition	71,599	39.16
Ramon Reyes (incumbent)	Nationalist People's Coalition	68,268	37.34
Vic Siquian	Aksyon Demokratiko	32,967	18.03
Linda Villar	Aksyon Demokratiko	9,999	5.47
Total		182,833	100.00
Total votes		152,023	–
Registered voters/turnout		179,384	84.75
Source: Commission on Elections

==== 4th district ====
Isabela's 4th provincial district consists of the same area as Isabela's 4th legislative district, excluding the city of Santiago. Two board members are elected from this provincial district.

Five candidates were included in the ballot.

Candidate	Party	Votes	%
Clifford Raspado (incumbent)	PDP–Laban	34,784	34.94
Victor Dy	PDP–Laban	25,610	25.72
Vinchy Aggabao	Nationalist People's Coalition	17,555	17.63
Amado Vallejo Jr.	Nationalist People's Coalition	12,399	12.45
Lito Salatan	Partido para sa Demokratikong Reporma	9,213	9.25
Total		99,561	100.00
Total votes		67,937	–
Registered voters/turnout		80,944	83.93
Source: Commission on Elections

==== 5th district ====
Isabela's 5th provincial district consists of the same area as Isabela's 5th legislative district. Two board members are elected from this provincial district.

Three candidates were included in the ballot.

Candidate	Party	Votes	%
King Dy	Laban ng Demokratikong Pilipino	75,490	48.85
Edward Isidro (incumbent)	Partido Federal ng Pilipinas	53,078	34.35
Renen Paraguison	Kilusang Bagong Lipunan	25,964	16.80
Total		154,532	100.00
Total votes		146,019	–
Registered voters/turnout		174,976	83.45
Source: Commission on Elections

==== 6th district ====
Isabela's 6th provincial district consists of the same area as Isabela's 6th legislative district. Two board members are elected from this provincial district.

Five candidates were included in the ballot.

Candidate	Party	Votes	%
Arco Meris (incumbent)	Aksyon Demokratiko	86,079	38.92
Amador Gaffud Jr.	PDP–Laban	76,837	34.74
Ralph Maloloyon	PDP–Laban	28,660	12.96
Che Macutay-Alviar	Liberal Party	18,069	8.17
Abe Lim	Independent	11,533	5.21
Total		221,178	100.00
Total votes		150,105	–
Registered voters/turnout		180,359	83.23
Source: Commission on Elections

== Nueva Vizcaya ==
=== Governor ===
Incumbent Governor Carlos Padilla of the Nacionalista Party ran for a third term.

Padilla won re-election against Nueva Vizcaya vice governor Tam-an Tomas (People's Reform Party).

Candidate	Party	Votes	%
Carlos Padilla (incumbent)	Nacionalista Party	143,552	59.48
Tam-an Tomas	People's Reform Party	97,774	40.52
Total		241,326	100.00
Total votes		252,486	–
Registered voters/turnout		296,233	85.23
Nacionalista hold			
Source: Commission on Elections

=== Vice Governor ===
Incumbent Vice Governor Tam-an Tomas of the People's Reform Party ran for governor of Nueva Vizcaya. He was previously affiliated with the National Unity Party.

Tomas endorsed former Nueva Vizcaya vice governor Jose Gambito (Lakas–CMD), who won against former Nueva Vizcaya vice governor Lambert Galima (Nacionalista Party).

Candidate	Party	Votes	%
Jose Gambito	Lakas–CMD	123,079	54.76
Lambert Galima	Nacionalista Party	101,664	45.24
Total		224,743	100.00
Total votes		252,486	–
Registered voters/turnout		296,233	85.23
Lakas gain from PRP			
Source: Commission on Elections

=== Provincial Board ===
The Nueva Vizcaya Provincial Board is composed of 13 board members, 10 of whom are elected.

The Nacionalista Party tied with Lakas–CMD at four seats each.

Party	Votes	%	Seats	+/–
Nacionalista Party	425,786	45.46	4	–2
Lakas–CMD	324,016	34.59	4	New
Aksyon Demokratiko	61,776	6.60	1	New
Partido Federal ng Pilipinas	49,210	5.25	1	+1
People's Reform Party	23,691	2.53	0	New
Independent	52,125	5.57	0	0
Total	936,604	100.00	10	0
Total votes	252,486	–		
Registered voters/turnout	296,233	85.23		

==== 1st district ====
Nueva Vizcaya's 1st provincial district consists of the municipalities of Ambaguio, Bagabag, Bayombong, Diadi, Quezon, Solano and Villaverde. Five board members are elected from this provincial district.

11 candidates were included in the ballot.

Candidate	Party	Votes	%
Edu Balgos (incumbent)	Lakas–CMD	69,100	15.35
Florante Gerdan	Aksyon Demokratiko	55,858	12.41
Delbert Tidang (incumbent)	Nacionalista Party	55,392	12.31
Elma Pinao-an-Lejao (incumbent)	Nacionalista Party	52,344	11.63
Pablo Kindot	Lakas–CMD	47,804	10.62
Clem Cadoy	Nacionalista Party	36,341	8.08
Arnel Hernandez	Nacionalista Party	34,130	7.58
Edgar Daniel Jr.	Lakas–CMD	33,476	7.44
Benji Lucas	Lakas–CMD	31,940	7.10
Teodorico Padilla Jr.	Nacionalista Party	27,729	6.16
Carlita Cudiaman	Aksyon Demokratiko	5,918	1.32
Total		450,032	100.00
Total votes		125,866	–
Registered voters/turnout		149,047	84.45
Source: Commission on Elections

==== 2nd district ====
Nueva Vizcaya's 2nd provincial district consists of the municipalities of Alfonso Castañeda, Aritao, Bambang, Dupax del Norte, Dupax del Sur, Kayapa, Kasibu and Santa Fe. Five board members are elected from this provincial district.

15 candidates were included in the ballot.

Candidate	Party	Votes	%
Eufemia Dacayo	Lakas–CMD	74,582	15.33
Pat-pat Dumlao (incumbent)	Nacionalista Party	66,421	13.65
Eunice Galima-Gambol (incumbent)	Nacionalista Party	58,647	12.05
Primo Percival Marcos (incumbent)	Partido Federal ng Pilipinas	49,210	10.11
Roland Carub (incumbent)	Lakas–CMD	43,525	8.95
Wilson Salas	Nacionalista Party	33,481	6.88
Victor Gines Jr.	Nacionalista Party	31,846	6.54
Johnny Liban	Nacionalista Party	29,455	6.05
Ronaldo Galvez	People's Reform Party	23,691	4.87
Policarpio Garing Jr.	Lakas–CMD	23,589	4.85
Victor Calingayan	Independent	22,024	4.53
Jose Evangelista	Independent	19,046	3.91
Jay Padilla	Independent	6,949	1.43
En Ramel	Independent	2,186	0.45
Carlito Abarquez	Independent	1,920	0.39
Total		486,572	100.00
Total votes		126,620	–
Registered voters/turnout		147,186	86.03
Source: Commission on Elections

== Quirino ==
=== Governor ===
Incumbent Governor Dakila Cua of Pederalismo ng Dugong Dakilang Samahan ran for a second term. He was previously affiliated with PDP–Laban.

Cua won re-election against former Nagtipunan mayor Rosario Camma (Aksyon Demokratiko).

Candidate	Party	Votes	%
Dakila Cua (incumbent)	Pederalismo ng Dugong Dakilang Samahan	82,377	81.65
Rosario Camma	Aksyon Demokratiko	18,512	18.35
Total		100,889	100.00
Total votes		106,416	–
Registered voters/turnout		123,868	85.91
PDDS hold			
Source: Commission on Elections

=== Vice Governor ===
Incumbent Vice Governor Jojo Vaquilar of PDP–Laban ran for a second term.

Vaquilar won re-election against former provincial board member Homer Bueno (Partido Pederal ng Maharlika).

Candidate	Party	Votes	%
Jojo Vaquilar (incumbent)	PDP–Laban	60,249	65.77
Homer Bueno	Partido Pederal ng Maharlika	31,363	34.23
Total		91,612	100.00
Total votes		106,416	–
Registered voters/turnout		123,868	85.91
PDP–Laban hold			
Source: Commission on Elections

=== Provincial Board ===
The Quirino Provincial Board is composed of 12 board members, eight of whom are elected.

PDP–Laban tied with the Nacionalista Party at two seats each.

Party	Votes	%	Seats	+/–
PDP–Laban	65,259	22.48	2	–5
Nacionalista Party	46,691	16.08	2	New
Nationalist People's Coalition	42,728	14.72	1	New
Aksyon Demokratiko	41,754	14.38	0	New
Partido para sa Demokratikong Reporma	29,556	10.18	1	New
Liberal Party	15,528	5.35	1	New
Partido Pederal ng Maharlika	8,576	2.95	0	New
Independent	40,245	13.86	1	0
Total	290,337	100.00	8	0
Total votes	106,416	–		
Registered voters/turnout	123,868	85.91		

==== 1st district ====
Quirino's 1st provincial district consists of the municipalities of Cabarroguis, Diffun and Saguday. Four board members are elected by this provincial district.

Five candidates were included in the ballot.

Candidate	Party	Votes	%
Babylyn Reyes (incumbent)	PDP–Laban	30,720	22.40
Marlo Guillermo (incumbent)	Nacionalista Party	30,154	21.99
Jovino Navalta (incumbent)	Partido para sa Demokratikong Reporma	29,556	21.55
Mercy Pagbilao	Nationalist People's Coalition	28,210	20.57
Rey Domingo	Aksyon Demokratiko	18,501	13.49
Total		137,141	100.00
Total votes		53,218	–
Registered voters/turnout		62,484	85.17
Source: Commission on Elections

==== 2nd district ====
Quirino's 2nd provincial district consists of the municipalities of Aglipay, Maddela and Nagtipunan. Four board members are elected by this provincial district.

11 candidates were included in the ballot.

Candidate	Party	Votes	%
Linda Dacmay (incumbent)	PDP–Laban	21,917	14.31
Roy Saladino	Independent	18,908	12.34
Elizabeth Saure (incumbent)	Nacionalista Party	16,537	10.79
Alegre Ylanan	Liberal Party	15,528	10.14
Celso Albano	Nationalist People's Coalition	14,518	9.48
Giovanni Eustaquio	PDP–Laban	12,622	8.24
Perla Olay	Independent	12,584	8.21
Rap-rap San Luis	Aksyon Demokratiko	12,425	8.11
Arnel Ballesteros	Aksyon Demokratiko	10,828	7.07
Erwin Mangaoil	Independent	8,753	5.71
Jirene Bueno	Partido Pederal ng Maharlika	8,576	5.60
Total		153,196	100.00
Total votes		53,198	–
Registered voters/turnout		61,384	86.66
Source: Commission on Elections

== Santiago ==
=== Mayor ===
Term-limited incumbent Mayor Joseph Tan of PDP–Laban ran for the House of Representatives in Isabela's 4th legislative district.

PDP–Laban nominated Tan's niece, representative Sheena Tan, who won the election against eight other candidates.

Candidate	Party	Votes	%
Sheena Tan	PDP–Laban	43,416	48.97
Otep Miranda	PROMDI	42,631	48.08
Maui Cornel	Independent	1,704	1.92
Nap Roque	Independent	583	0.66
Walter Jay Miguel	Partido Federal ng Pilipinas	124	0.14
Christopher Ayson	Independent	60	0.07
Marcelino Licudine	Independent	57	0.06
Genalyn Tesoro	Lakas–CMD	52	0.06
Arthur Valdez	Independent	37	0.04
Total		88,664	100.00
Total votes		91,566	–
Registered voters/turnout		111,285	82.28
PDP–Laban hold			
Source: Commission on Elections

=== Vice Mayor ===
Incumbent Vice Mayor Alvin Abaya of PDP–Laban ran for a third term.

Abaya won re-election against former Santiago vice mayor Amelita Navarro (Partido para sa Demokratikong Reporma) and three other candidates.

Candidate	Party	Votes	%
Alvin Abaya (incumbent)	PDP–Laban	42,032	49.04
Amelita Navarro	Partido para sa Demokratikong Reporma	34,558	40.32
Soc Navarro	PROMDI	7,143	8.33
Bonifacio Bartolome	Pederalismo ng Dugong Dakilang Samahan	1,448	1.69
Angelo Lim	Independent	534	0.62
Total		85,715	100.00
Total votes		91,566	–
Registered voters/turnout		111,285	82.28
PDP–Laban hold			
Source: Commission on Elections

=== City Council ===
The Santiago City Council is composed of 13 councilors, 10 of whom are elected.

30 candidates were included in the ballot.

PDP–Laban remained as the largest party in the city council with six seats, but lost its majority.

Party	Votes	%	Seats	+/–
PDP–Laban	312,324	44.85	6	–2
Liberal Party	85,092	12.22	2	+1
Aksyon Demokratiko	74,711	10.73	1	New
Nationalist People's Coalition	72,958	10.48	0	0
Lakas–CMD	59,260	8.51	1	+1
Partido para sa Demokratikong Reporma	22,925	3.29	0	New
PROMDI	13,617	1.96	0	New
Akbayan	12,586	1.81	0	New
Pederalismo ng Dugong Dakilang Samahan	3,785	0.54	0	New
Partido Federal ng Pilipinas	2,634	0.38	0	New
Independent	36,466	5.24	0	–1
Total	696,358	100.00	10	0
Total votes	91,566	–		
Registered voters/turnout	111,285	82.28		

Candidate	Party	Votes	%
Arlene Alvarez-Reyes	Liberal Party	49,895	7.17
Paul de Jesus (incumbent)	PDP–Laban	47,617	6.84
Resie Turingan (incumbent)	PDP–Laban	47,009	6.75
Cassandra Eunice Sable (incumbent)	PDP–Laban	46,889	6.73
KC Bautista (incumbent)	PDP–Laban	44,318	6.36
Jamayne Tan (incumbent)	PDP–Laban	42,560	6.11
Jigs Miranda	Aksyon	40,987	5.89
Olan Chan	Lakas–CMD	35,883	5.15
Jun Cabucana (incumbent)	Liberal Party	35,197	5.05
Sherman Miguel	PDP–Laban	34,901	5.01
Aysen Marrero	Nationalist People's Coalition	34,015	4.88
Benzi Chai (incumbent)	Aksyon Demokratiko	33,724	4.84
Gino Siquian	PDP–Laban	32,095	4.61
Lyka Posidio	Lakas–CMD	23,377	3.36
Maurice Navarro	Partido para sa Demokratikong Reporma	22,925	3.29
Aga Castillo	PDP–Laban	16,935	2.43
Tyrone Buck	PROMDI	13,617	1.96
Nixon Dumag	Independent	13,139	1.89
Mark Sotto	Akbayan	12,586	1.81
Philip Almazan	Nationalist People's Coalition	11,465	1.65
Honey Chua	Nationalist People's Coalition	10,626	1.53
Russell Quines	Nationalist People's Coalition	9,669	1.39
Monching Sarangaya	Independent	8,029	1.15
Tabachingching Bernabe	Independent	7,886	1.13
Martin Hubert Taguinod	Nationalist People's Coalition	7,183	1.03
Harrison Mark Lim Yuen	Independent	5,514	0.79
Loy Manubay	Pederalismo ng Dugong Dakilang Samahan	3,131	0.45
Gene Jose	Partido Federal ng Pilipinas	2,634	0.38
Rolando Dacanay	Independent	1,898	0.27
Percy Lood	Pederalismo ng Dugong Dakilang Samahan	654	0.09
Total		696,358	100.00
Total votes		91,566	–
Registered voters/turnout		111,285	82.28
Source: Commission on Elections
