= Tuguegarao City Science High School =

Specialized public high school in Tuguegarao City, Philippines

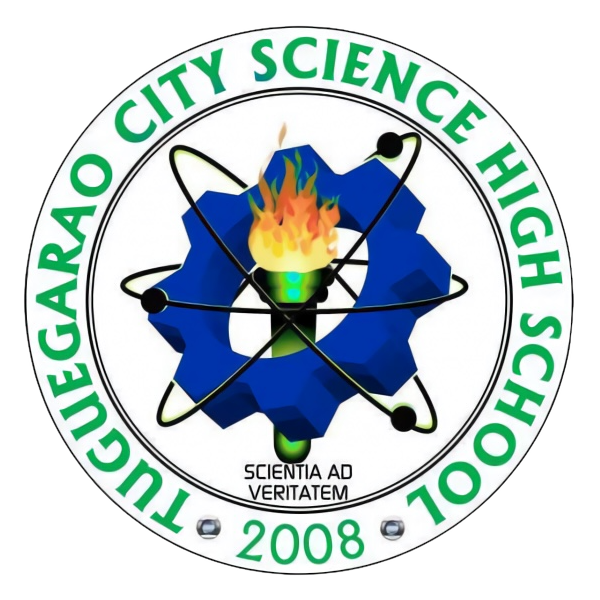

Location
- Mabini Street, Centro 3 Tuguegarao City, Cagayan, Cagayan Valley; Philippines; 17°36′49″N 121°43′30″E

Information
- Other names: Ang Dating Munisipyo
- Type: Public specialized high school
- Motto: Scientia ad Veritatem (Knowledge leads to the Truth)
- Established: 2008; 18 years ago
- Founder: Hon. Delfin T. Ting during his term as City Mayor
- Oversight: Division of Tuguegarao City
- Principal: Mr. Generose D. Conde
- Teaching staff: ~50
- Grades: 7-12
- Colors: Blue and green
- Newspaper: Ang Lawin (Filipino); The Tuguegarao City Scribes (English)
- Hymn: TCSHS Hymn

Tuguegarao City Science High School, abbreviated as TCSHS and also locally known as Tugsay, is a specialized public secondary school located in Tuguegarao City, Cagayan. Established in 2008, it is the first public science high school in the province, and is operated and supervised by the Department of Education (DepEd).

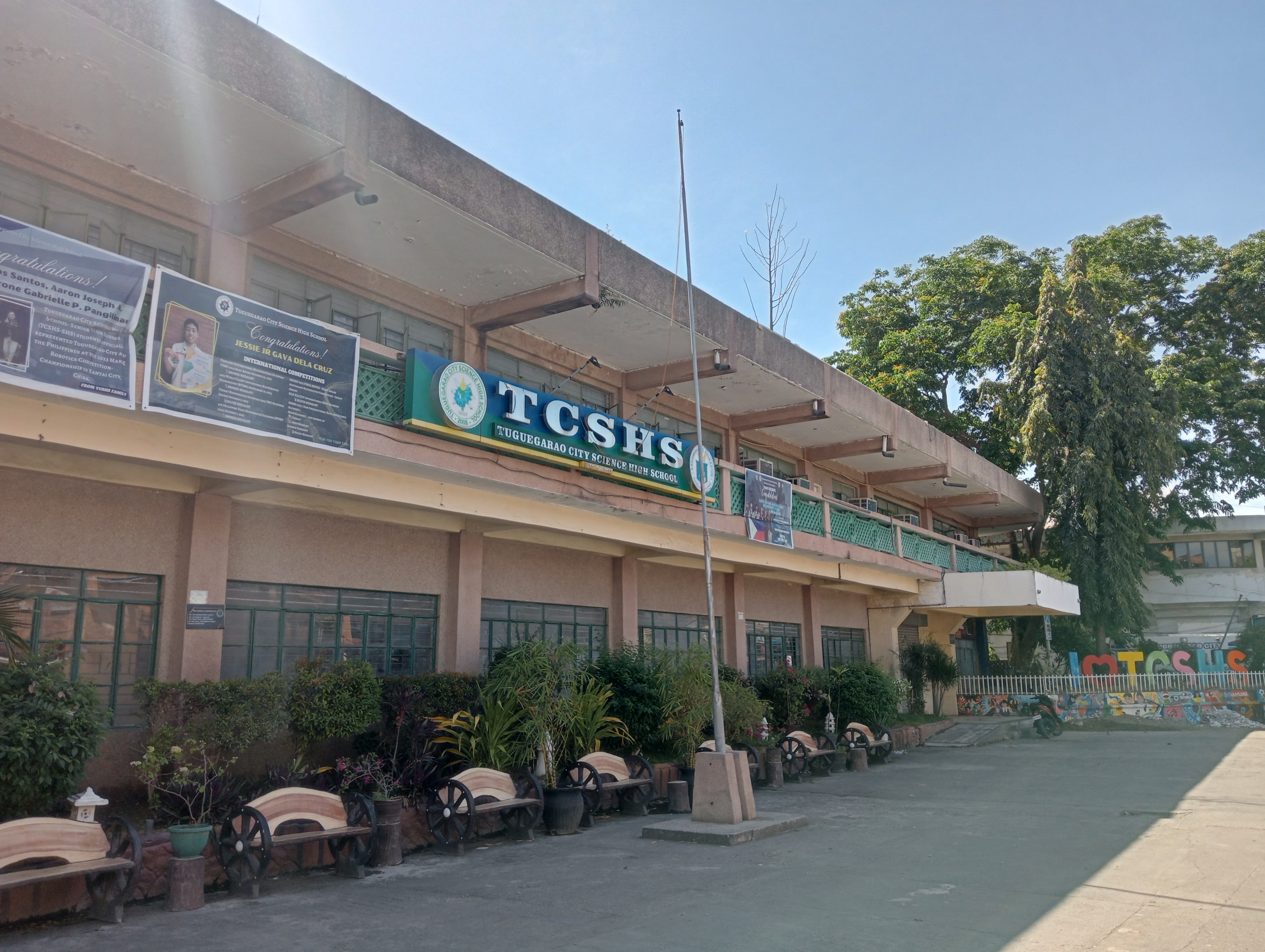
Tuguegarao City Science High School's front area. (March 2024)

The school offers a curriculum that emphasizes science and mathematics, encourages research-based learning, alongside student participation in various regional, national, and international competitions. With its STEM-inclined curriculum, the graduates of TCSHS are encouraged to pursue college majors in pure and applied sciences, mathematics, or engineering.

== History ==
The Tuguegarao City Science High School was founded by the former mayor of Tuguegarao City, Delfin Telan Ting.

The inception of TCSHS was made possible by Resolution No. 091-2006. City Councilors Eliseo B. Ave, Corona C. Borja, Michael Ting, and Bonifacio Quilang sponsored the resolution that would eventually see the creation of the Tuguegarao City Division's Science High School. The Sangguniang Panlungsod headed by Vice-Mayor Arnel Arugay and Mayor Randolph Ting unanimously approved the resolution.

On July 27, 2007, the DepEd Regional Director Jesus Taberdo approved the request; thus, Tuguegarao City saw the institution of TCSHS by virtue of DepEd Order No. 49, S. 2003 and DepEd Order No. 69, S. 1993. The department orders provide that there shall be one region/division science high school for each region/division for highly gifted students who are inclined towards science. After all the rigors of its establishment, TCSHS started its operation on June 10, 2008 at the City's old municipal hall along Mabini Street with a population of 90 able scholars.

The school used to separate its students by sections according to their scores in the entrance examination. However, in the school year 2008–2009, the school's pioneering batch did not take the exam. The students of this batch were passers of the Philippine Science High School, including first screening passers. For the second year afterwards, students were sorted by the general average they attained for the fourth grading period. As of school year 2012–2013, the K-12 curriculum was introduced through Republic Act 10533, by adding two extra years to the basic education curriculum. Starting on the school year 2018–2019, heterogenous sectioning for all grade levels were implemented.

In the school year 2023–2024, TCSHS was chosen as one of the beneficiaries of Project ACCELERATES—a program made with the collaborative effort of the Department of Science and Technology (DOST), the Philippine Science High School, and the Local Government Unit (LGU) of Tuguegarao City to provide the school's laboratories with robotics kits to enhance academic performance and learning abilities in science.

Under the Department of Education's new Three-Term (Trimester) system for academic year 2026–2027 and the Strengthened Senior High School (SSHS) curriculum, TCSHS saw the addition of one other section to Grade 11 and a new and improved school calendar.

== Education ==
=== Admission ===
Admission to the school is based solely on performance in its entrance examination. Applicants who have passed the Philippine Science High School entrance exam are eligible for automatic enrollment, provided they submit a photocopy of their exam results. All candidates must register online or on-site before the examination and submit a copy of their most recent Grade 6 report card. The examination is conducted exclusively on-site.

Transferring Grade 11 students must also submit their most recent report card and register on-site. Applicants will be evaluated based on academic performance. Those who pass this evaluation will be contacted by the school if they are shortlisted for the final interview.

=== Curricula ===
==== Junior High School ====
The curriculum for the Junior High School properly follows the curriculum set by the Department of Education, in accordance with the newly implemented MATATAG Curriculum. In Grades 7–10, pupils study the core subjects taught since elementary, with a heavier emphasis on mathematics and science. Science is taught through four rotating sub-topics—Biology, Basic Physics, Basic Chemistry, and Earth and Space—each spanning one academic quarter. In addition to these core disciplines, each grade level includes three supplementary subjects:

- Environmental Science, Research, and Introduction to Robotics for Grade 7;
- Geometry, Biotechnology, and Computer for Grade 8;
- Calculus, Advanced Physics, and Statistics for Grade 9; and
- Differential Equations, Advanced Chemistry, and Research for Grade 10.

==== Senior High School ====
In the previous curriculum, the Senior High School offered only one strand—specifically, the Science, Technology, Engineering, and Mathematics (STEM) strand. It followed the curriculum defined by the Department of Education for the specific strand.

Recently, the academic year 2026–2027 saw the Senior High School adopting three electives in line with the newly implemented Strengthened Senior High School (SSHS) Curriculum: Allied Health Sciences, Engineering, and Social Sciences. These electives are separated into the four sections of Grade 11, with Aristotle under Social Sciences, Socrates under Engineering, and both Democritus and Galenus under Allied Health Sciences.

=== Sections ===
The Tuguegarao City Science High School divides Grades 7 through 10 into four sections per grade level, with each section having no more than 40 students, resulting in a total not exceeding 160 students per batch. In the Senior High School, the students enrolled are sorted into four sections for Grade 11 and three sections for Grade 12. Every section has its own homeroom adviser and bears the name of a notable physicist, chemist, mathematician, or philosopher celebrated for their significant and lasting contributions to their respective fields.

Junior High School				Senior High School	
Grade 7	Grade 8	Grade 9	Grade 10	Grade 11	Grade 12
Archimedes	Descartes	Dalton	Curie	Aristotle	da Vinci
Bernoulli	Euclid	Lavoisier	Einstein	Democritus	Vesalius
Galileo	Fermat	Moseley	Faraday	Socrates	Mendeleev
Joule	Pythagoras	Pascal	Newton	Galenus	

== Administration ==
The current administration is headed by Mr. Generose D. Conde, Principal II.

Principals
Name	Year of Office
Linda P. Tungcul, Ph.D.	2008 – 2011
Ernestina A. Cariniugan	2011 – 2015
Grace T. Macababbad	2015 – 2018
Elpidio A. Mabasa Jr.	2018 – 2020
Carmen A. Acain	2020 – 2022
Rosechelle M. Cauilan, Ph.D.	2022 – 2024
Eduardo C. Dela Rosa	2024 – 2026
Salvacion V. Ramos	2026 – 2026
Generose D. Conde	2026 — Present
