= Randolph Ting =

Filipino politician

The Honourable Randolph Ting
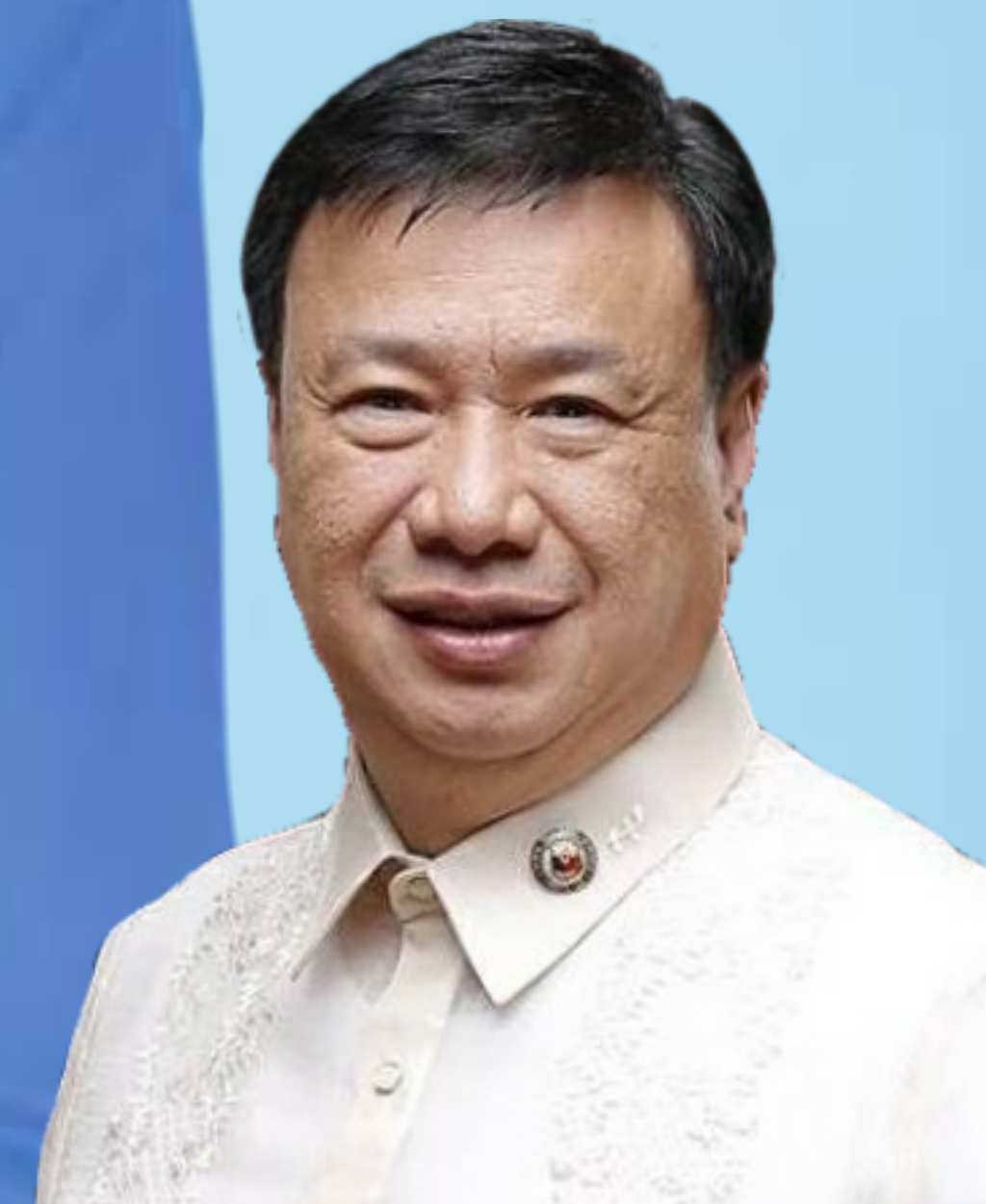

Deputy Speaker of the Philippine House of Representatives
- In office January 21, 2019 – June 4, 2019
- Speaker: Gloria Macapagal Arroyo

Member of the Philippine House of Representatives from Cagayan's 3rd congressional district
- In office June 30, 2010 – June 30, 2019
- Preceded by: Manuel N. Mamba
- Succeeded by: Joseph Lara

Mayor of Tuguegarao
- In office June 30, 1998 – June 30, 2007
- Succeeded by: Delfin T. Ting

Personal details
- Born: Randolph Sera Ting; February 4, 1965 (age 61) Tuguegarao, Cagayan, Philippines
- Citizenship: Philippines
- Party: NUP (2011–present)
- Other political affiliations: Lakas–CMD (before 2011)
- Spouse: Nancy Pobre Ting
- Nickname: Randy

Randolph "Randy" Sera Ting (born in Tuguegarao, February 4, 1965) is a Filipino politician.

Ting is the son of Former Tuguegarao City Mayor Delfin Ting. In 2001, he was elected as the Mayor of Tuguegarao. During his term, Tuguegarao has been a competitive, livable, safe and clean city.

In the year 2002, the city had a big fiscal management under his term as Mayor. Ting served as the representative from the 3rd District of Cagayan and was succeeded by Joseph L. Lara.

Within 9 years in Congress, he was elected as the Deputy Speaker of the Philippine House of Representatives on January 21, 2019. During his last term, he decided to run as Governor of Cagayan and his wife Nancy run for Congress.

== Notes ==
House of Representatives of the Philippines
Preceded by Manuel Mamba	Representative, 3rd District of Cagayan; 2010 - 2019	Succeeded by Joseph Lara
