= Edgar Aglipay =

Filipino businessman and police officer

The Honorable Edgar Aglipay
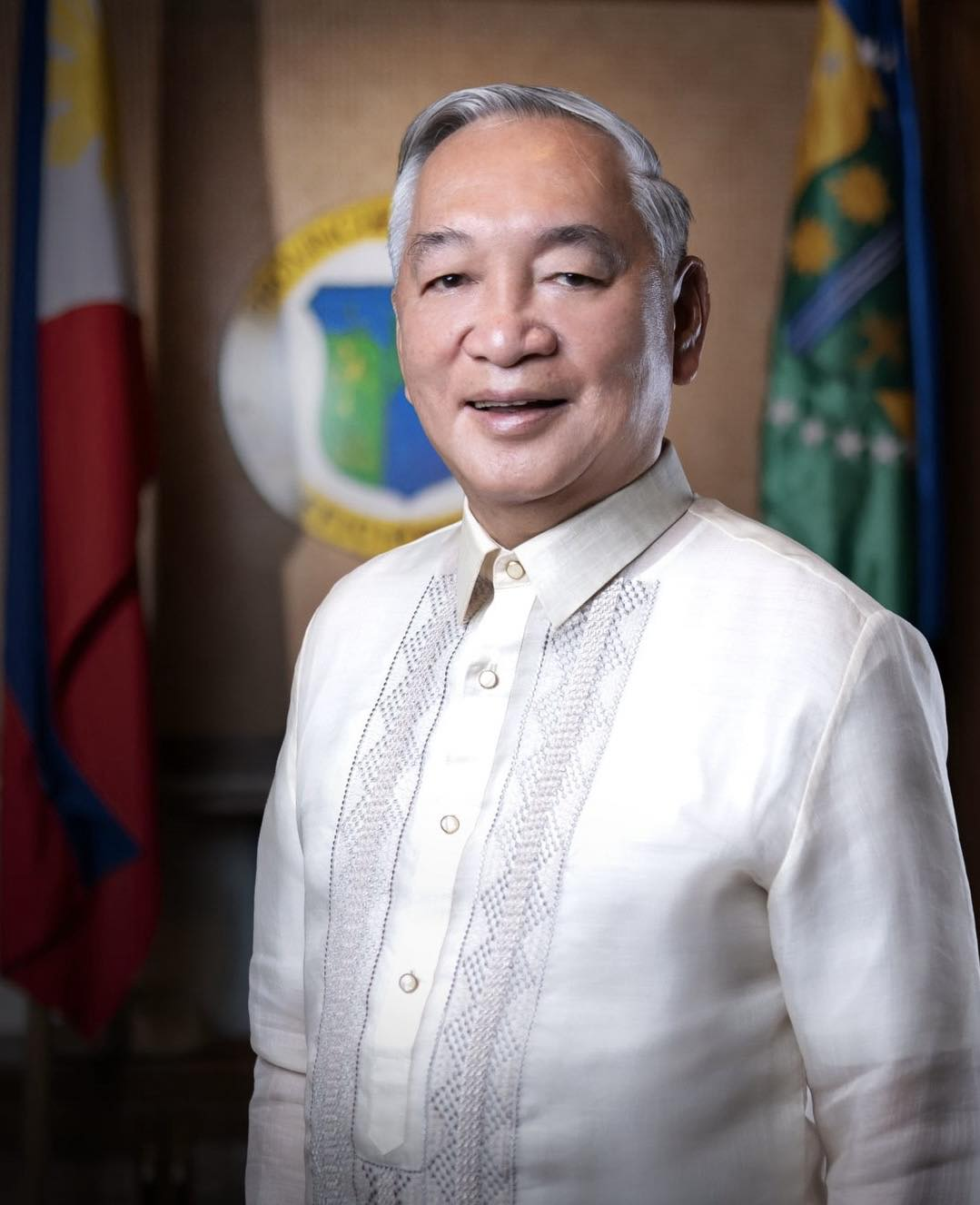
- Official portrait, 2025

34th Governor of Cagayan
- Incumbent
- Assumed office June 30, 2025
- Vice Governor: Manuel Mamba
- Preceded by: Manuel Mamba

Chairman, DIWA partylist
- In office June 30, 2006 – May 25, 2020

Chairman, Philippine Retirement Authority
- In office June 15, 2005 – February 1, 2010
- President: Gloria Macapagal Arroyo
- Preceded by: Jose Antonio Leviste
- Succeeded by: Jesli Lapus

11th Chief of the Philippine National Police
- In office August 23, 2004 – March 14, 2005
- President: Gloria Macapagal Arroyo
- Preceded by: Hermogenes Ebdane
- Succeeded by: Arturo Lomibao

Personal details
- Born: Edgar Batalla Aglipay; 13 September 1948 (age 77) Camalaniugan, Cagayan, Philippines
- Party: Nacionalista (2024–present); One Cagayan (local party)
- Other political affiliations: DIWA Partylist
- Spouse: Marinette Yan
- Children: Michael Aglipay, Emmeline Aglipay-Villar
- Education: Philippine Military Academy; University of the Philippines; Ateneo de Manila University
- Occupation: Police officer, government officer, businessman
- Awards: Distinguished Conduct Star; Gold Cross Medal; Cavalier award (1991, 2016)

Military service
- Allegiance: Philippines
- Branch/service: Philippine Constabulary
- Battles/wars: MV Karagatan incident 1989 Philippine coup d'état attempt: 1989 retaking of Makati CBD
- Education: Philippine Military Academy
- Police career
- Service: Philippine National Police
- Allegiance: Philippines
- Divisions: Special Action Force; NCRPO
- Service years: 1971–2005
- Rank: Director General

Edgar "Egay" Batalla Aglipay (born September 13, 1948) is a Filipino businessman, retired police officer and politician who is the present governor of Cagayan since 2025. He was the Chief of the Philippine National Police (PNP) from August 23, 2004, to March 14, 2005.

== Career ==
Aglipay is a relative of revolutionary hero Gregorio Aglipay. He was a member of the Philippine Military Academy class of 1971, and has a Master's of Business Administration (MBA) from the University of the Philippines. He also has a law degree from Ateneo de Manila University.

In 1972, as a young lieutenant, he was the platoon leader of the raiding team that captured MV Karagatan which prevented the New People's Army from getting hold of 1,500 M-14 rifles and other high power firearms.

Aglipay served as chief deputy director-general of the National Capital Region Police Office (NCRPO) from 1998 to 2001. In January 2000, Aglipay relieved and assigned replacements for two police chiefs of the cities of Mandaluyong and Pasig, Superintendents Rodolfo Tutaan and Raul Medina respectively, upon the orders of then PNP chief Panfilo Lacson due to the underwhelming and neglectful performance of their subordinates. Multiple mayors of Metro Manila were infuriated with Aglipay's supposed preemptive move, claiming that he made his decision without consulting them first, with Marikina Mayor Bayani Fernando being the first to call for his ouster while Jejomar Binay, chairman of the Metropolitan Manila Development Authority (MMDA), led the mayors in pushing for his removal. After a closed-door meeting on January 28 between Binay and the mayors and the pair of Aglipay and Lacson, however, they resolved the controversy and allowed Aglipay to retain his post, with Interior Secretary Alfredo Lim stating that the issue simply came from a "communication gap".

Upon the Second EDSA Revolution in January 2001, Aglipay and the five metropolitan police district directors joined the Armed Forces of the Philippines in withdrawing their support for President Joseph Estrada and going to EDSA, with Aglipay ordering his subordinates to keep the peace and "protect the people" in the area.

Aglipay was elected as governor of Cagayan in the 2025 Philippine general election.

== Personal life ==
Nicknamed "Egay", married Marinette Yan in January 1975. Aglipay is the father of Congressman Michael Aglipay and father of former DOJ and DSWD undersecretary and Diwa partylist representative Emmeline Yan Aglipay-Villar, who is in turn the wife of senator Mark Villar.

Political offices
Preceded by Manuel Mamba	Governor of Cagayan; 2025–present	Incumbent
Police appointments
Preceded by Hermogenes Ebdane	Chief of the Philippine National Police; 2004–2005	Succeeded by Arturo Lomibao
