= Governor of Cagayan =

Local chief executive of Cagayan Province

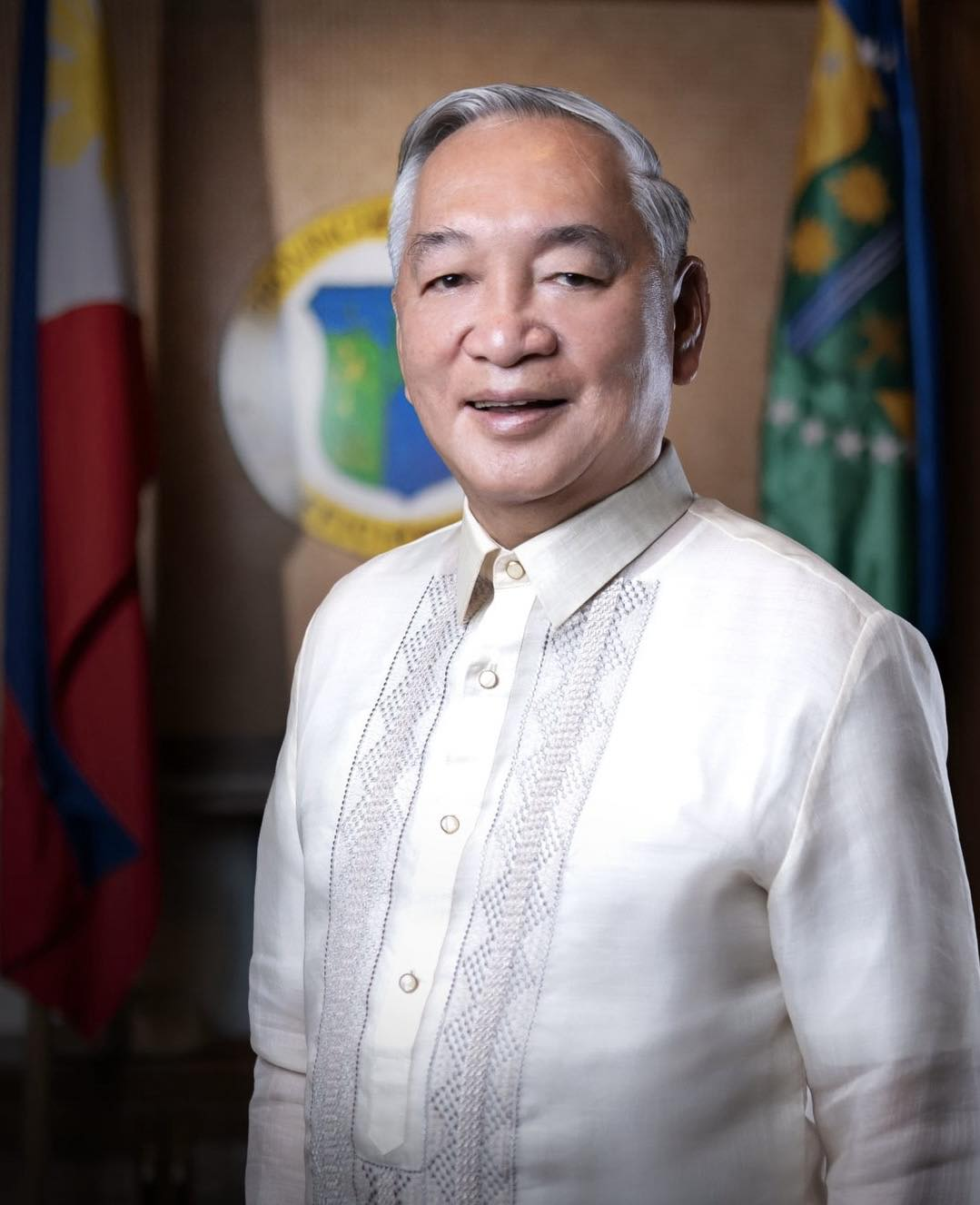
- Incumbent; Edgar Aglipay since June 30, 2025
- Term length: 3 years, not eligible for re-election immediately after three consecutive terms
- Inaugural holder: Don Pablo Guzman (Civil Governor)
- Formation: 1581 (Spanish era); 1901 (American era)
- Website: https://www.cagayan.gov.ph/governors-corner/

The governor of Cagayan (Filipino: Punong Panlalawigan ng Cagayan), is the chief executive of the provincial government of Cagayan.

== List of governors of Cagayan ==
There have been 34 governors of Cagayan since the establishment of the civil government in 1901 after the Philippine-American War.

No.	Image	Governor	Hometown	Term
1		Enrique Altamirano y Salcedo (Last Spanish Governor of Cagayan)	-	1898
2		Gen. Daniel Mata Tria Tirona (Governor of Isabela and Cagayan)	Cavite El Viejo (Kawit) (Cavite)	1898
3		Vicente Nepomuceno (Governor of Cagayan)	Camalaniugan	1898–1900
4		Gracio Gonzaga	Tuguegarao	1900–1901
5		Pablo Guzman	Enrile	1901–1906
6		Vicente Masigan	Santa Maria (Isabela)	1907–1910
7		Antonio Carag	Tuguegarao	1911–1914
8		Honorio Lasam	Tuguegarao	1915–1918
9		Fermin Macanayan	Aparri	1919–1922
10		Proceso Sebastian	Claveria	1922–1929
11		Vicente Formoso	Aparri	1930–1937
12		Servando Liban	Tuguegarao	1938–1940; 1946–1947
13		Marcelo Adduru	Tuguegarao	1941–1942; 1943; 1955–1959
14		Nicanor Carag	Tuguegarao	1942–1946 (appointed by the Japanese)
15		Baldomero Perez	Tuguegarao	1945–1946 (appointed by the Philippine Civil Affairs Unit during the Liberation)
16		Peregrino R. Quinto	Tuguegarao	1946
17		Nicasio P. Arranz	Alcala	1948–1950
18		Roberto Avena	-	1950
19		Jose P. Carag	Camalaniugan	1950–1955
20		Felipe R. Garduque	Camalaniugan	1960–1963
21		Teresa J. Dupaya	Lal-lo	1964–1979; 1987
22		Brig. Gen. Romeo Gatan	- (Isabela)	1979–1980
23		Justiniano P. Cortez	Ballesteros	1980–1986
24		Benjamin Ligot	Solana	1986–1987
25		Francisco Mamba	Tuao	1987
26		Domingo de Leon	Tuguegarao	1987–1988
27		Rodolfo E. Aguinaldo	Gattaran (Pasuquin, Ilocos Norte)	1988–1990; 1992–1998
28		Melvin P. Vargas Sr.	Abulug	1990–1992
29		David Puzon Jr.	Pamplona	1992
30		Florencio L. Vargas	Abulug	1998–2001
31		Edgar R. Lara	Lasam	2001–2007
32		Alvaro T. Antonio	Alcala	2007–2016
33		Manuel N. Mamba Sr.	Tuao	2016–2025
–		Melvin K. Vargas Jr.	Abulug	2025 (Acting capacity)
34		Edgar B. Aglipay	Camalaniugan	2025–present
