= Alvaro Antonio =

Filipino politician

The Honourable Alvaro Antonio
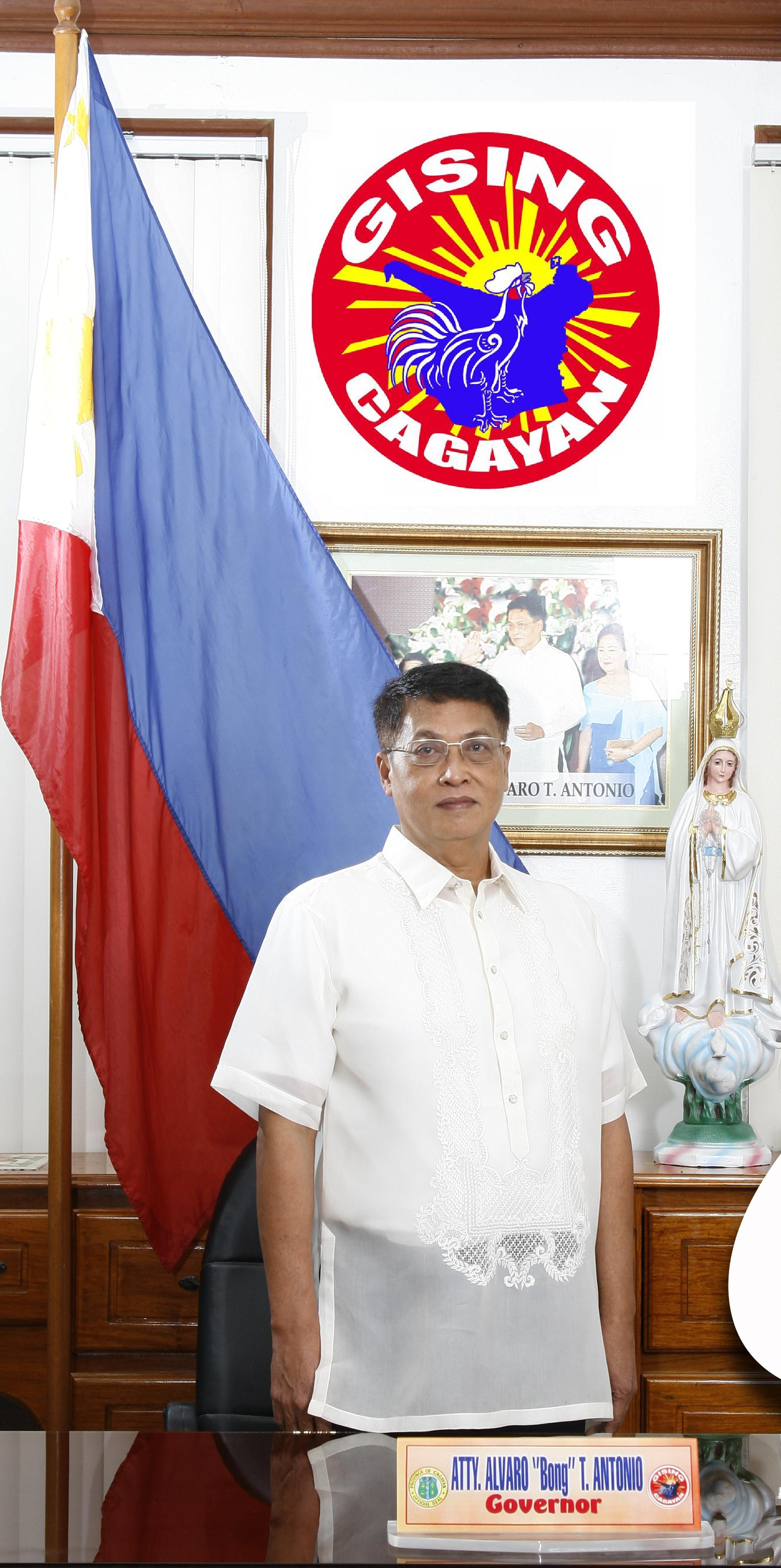

Governor of Cagayan
- In office June 30, 2007 – June 30, 2016
- Vice Governor: Leonides Fausto
- Preceded by: Edgar Lara
- Succeeded by: Manuel Mamba

Mayor of Alcala
- In office June 30, 1998 – June 30, 2007

Personal details
- Born: Alvaro Trinidad Antonio; February 19, 1952 (age 74) Alcala, Cagayan, Philippines
- Party: PFP (2024–present)
- Other political affiliations: UNA (2012–2024); Lakas (before 2012)
- Spouse(s): Teresita Ignacio Antonio (deceased); Digna Puzon-Antonio
- Profession: Lawyer; Politician

Alvaro Trinidad Antonio, also known by his nickname Bong or Ambong, (born February 19, 1952) is a Filipino politician, who was the Governor of Cagayan from 2007 to 2016. He is a former pro-bono lawyer at the Citizen's Legal Action Office (now known as Public Attorney's Office or PAO) and a former mayor of Alcala.

== Education ==
Antonio spent his high school years at San Jacinto Seminary in Peñablanca, Cagayan, where he graduated in 1968. He thereafter went to the University of Santo Tomas in Manila, to pursue his college studies. Antonio completed his baccalaureate in philosophy, with honors, in 1972. Antonio proceeded to take up law, also at UST. While finishing his law degree, Antonio joined the Suprema Lex Fraternity.

== Career ==
Antonio started his career as a pro bono lawyer at the Citizen's Legal Action Office (now the Public Attorney's Office). He then ran and won as mayor of his hometown of Alcala, Cagayan. In 2007, he was elected as Governor of Cagayan, with the support of then Congressman Manuel Mamba and Senator Juan Ponce Enrile, narrowly defeating former governor Edgar Lara by a margin of 662 votes. Antonio went on to win two more terms, leaving office in 2016.

During his governorship, Antonio's relations with Mamba deteriorated, leading to the latter unsuccessfully challenging Antonio for governor in 2010. During the 2013 Philippine general election on 13 May, Mamba accused Antonio of firing an AK-47 at his convoy in Alcala. At the time, Mamba's brother William lost his bid to unseat Antonio for the governorship. Antonio denied the accusation. On December 22, 2014, Antonio was arrested at the Cagayan provincial capitol on charges relating to the incident but was released on the same day after posting P10,000 in bail.

Antonio ran again for governor in 2019 but lost to the incumbent Governor Manuel Mamba, landing in third place.

Antonio ran for vice governor of Cagayan in the 2025 Philippine general election but lost to outgoing governor Mamba, placing third.

== Other ventures ==
Antonio owned a series of defunct sports teams, all named the Rising Suns: the Cagayan Rising Suns for men's basketball, Cagayan Valley Lady Rising Suns for women's volleyball, and Cagayan Valley Rising Suns for men's basketball.

== Personal life ==
Antonio has been married twice, with his second wife, Digna Puzon-Antonio, being a mayor of Pamplona, Cagayan. His eldest daughter, Cristina, has also served as mayor of Alcala and ran unsuccessfully to succeed him as governor in 2016. Another daughter, Criselda, also served as mayor of Alcala and is married to former Philippine Basketball Association coach Alvin Pua.

His brother, Patrick Antonio, served as a member of the House of Representatives of the Philippines for Agbiag party-list.

Political offices
Preceded by Edgar Lara	Governor of Cagayan; 2007–2016	Succeeded by Manuel Mamba
