= Cagayan Provincial Board =

Legislative body of the province of Cagayan, Philippines

Cagayan Provincial Board Sangguniang Panlalawigan ng Cagayan

Type
- Type: Unicameral
- Term limits: 3 terms (9 years)

Leadership
- Presiding Officer: Manuel Mamba, Nacionalista since June 30, 2025

Structure
- Seats: 13 board members 1 ex officio presiding officer
- Political groups: Nacionalista (3) Lakas (7) NPC (1) Nonpartisan (2)
- Length of term: 3 years
- Authority: Local Government Code of the Philippines

Elections
- Voting system: Plurality-at-large (regular members); Indirect election (ex officio members)
- Last election: May 12, 2025
- Next election: May 15, 2028

Meeting place
- Sangguniang Panlalawigan Session Hall, Legislative Building, Capitol Hills, Tuguegarao

The Cagayan Provincial Board is the Sangguniang Panlalawigan (provincial legislature) of the Philippine province of Cagayan.

The members are elected via plurality-at-large voting: the province is divided into three districts, the first two sending three members to the provincial board, while the third sends four members; the electorate votes, and the number of winning candidates depends on the number of members their district sends. The vice governor is the ex officio presiding officer, and only votes to break ties. The vice governor is elected via the plurality voting system province-wide.

The districts used in appropriation of members is coextensive with the legislative districts of Cagayan.

== District apportionment ==
| Elections | No. of seats per district | | | Ex officio seats | Total seats |
| Elections | 1st | 2nd | 3rd | Ex officio seats | Total seats |
|---|---|---|---|---|---|
| 2004–present | 3 | 3 | 4 | 3 | 13 |

== List of members ==
An additional three ex officio members are the presidents of the provincial chapters of the Association of Barangay Captains, the Councilors' League, the Sangguniang Kabataan provincial president; the municipal and city (if applicable) presidents of the Association of Barangay Captains, Councilor's League and Sangguniang Kabataan, shall elect amongst themselves their provincial presidents which shall be their representatives at the board.

=== Current members ===
These are the members after the 2025 local elections and 2023 barangay and SK elections:

- Vice Governor: Manuel N. Mamba (Nacionalista)

| Seat | Board member | Party | Start of term | End of term |
|---|---|---|---|---|
| 1st district | Rowena G. Retoma | Lakas | June 30, 2025 | June 30, 2028 |
| 1st district | Kamille Concepcion P. Perez | Lakas | June 30, 2022 | June 30, 2028 |
| 1st district | Romeo S. Garcia | Nacionalista | June 30, 2022 | June 30, 2028 |
| 2nd district | Randy A. Ursulam | Lakas | June 30, 2022 | June 30, 2028 |
| 2nd district | Alniñoson Kevin M. Timbas | Lakas | June 30, 2022 | June 30, 2028 |
| 2nd district | Vilmer V. Viloria | Lakas | June 30, 2025 | June 30, 2028 |
| 3rd district | Jean Alphonse D. Ponce | Lakas | June 30, 2025 | June 30, 2028 |
| 3rd district | Engelbert C. Caronan Jr. | Nacionalista | June 30, 2025 | June 30, 2028 |
| 3rd district | Romar F. De Asis | Nacionalista | June 30, 2025 | June 30, 2028 |
| 3rd district | Leonides M. Fausto Jr. | Lakas | June 30, 2025 | June 30, 2028 |
| ABC | Bryan Paul Vargas | Nonpartisan | August 1, 2018 | January 1, 2026 |
| PCL | Ma. Rosario B. Soriano | NPC | July 25, 2022 | June 30, 2028 |
| SK | Rey Jirowell D. Alameda | Nonpartisan | December 1, 2023 | January 1, 2026 |

=== Vice Governor ===
| Election year | Name | Party |
|---|---|---|
| 1998 | Oscar Pagulayan | |
| 2001 | Oscar Pagulayan | |
| 2004 | Oscar Pagulayan | LDP |
| 2007 | Leonides Fausto | Liberal |
| 2010 | Leonides Fausto | Nacionalista |
| 2013 | Leonides Fausto | Nacionalista |
| 2016 | Boy Vargas | UNA |
| 2019 | Boy Vargas | UNA |
| 2022 | Boy Vargas | PDP–Laban |
| 2025 | Manuel Mamba | Nacionalista |

=== 1st District ===
- Municipalities: Alcala, Aparri, Baggao, Buguey, Camalaniugan, Gattaran, Gonzaga, Lal-lo, Santa Ana, Santa Teresita
- Population (2020): 459,819

| Election year | Member (party) | Member (party) | Member (party) |
|---|---|---|---|
| 2004 | Jenerwin Bacuyag (NPC) | Norman Agatep (NPC) | Wilson Payaoan (NPC) |
| 2007 | Jenerwin Bacuyag (NPC) | Norman Agatep (NPC) | Arnold Alonzo (NPC) |
| 2010 | Romeo Garcia (Lakas) | Maria Olivia Pascual (Lakas) | Jean Alphonse Ponce (Independent) |
| 2013 | Romeo Garcia (UNA) | Maria Olivia Pascual (UNA) | Ramon Nolasco (UNA) |
| 2016 | Maria Olivia Pascual (NPC) | Jean Alphonse Ponce (Nacionalista) | Christopher Barcena (UNA) |
| 2019 | Narciso Pascual Jr. (PDP–Laban) | Jean Alphonse Ponce (PDP–Laban) | Christopher Barcena (PDP–Laban) |
| 2022 | Florence Oliver Pascual (PDP–Laban) | Kamille Ponce-Perez (NPC) | Romeo S. Garcia (Nacionalista) |
| 2025 | Rowena G. Retoma (Lakas) | Kamille Concepcion P. Perez (Lakas) | Romeo S. Garcia (Nacionalista) |

=== 2nd District ===
- Municipalities: Abulug, Allacapan, Ballesteros, Calayan, Claveria, Lasam, Pamplona, Piat, Rizal, Sanchez-Mira, Santa Praxedes, Santo Niño
- Population (2020): 322,634

| Election year | Member (party) | Member (party) | Member (party) |
|---|---|---|---|
| 2004 | Aldegundo Cayosa, Jr. (NPC) | Estrella Fernandez (NPC) | Vilmer Viloria (NPC) |
| 2007 | Boy Vargas (KAMPI) | Jessie Usita (NPC) | Erwin Lara (NPC) |
| 2010 | Boy Vargas (Lakas-Kampi) | Jessie Usita (NPC) | Joseph Llopis (Lakas-Kampi) |
| 2013 | Boy Vargas (NUP) | Alexander Daguna (NUP) | Vilmer Viloria (UNA) |
| 2016 | Jesus Florencio Vargas (NUP) | Arnold Layus (UNA) | Vilmer Viloria (Nacionalista) |
| 2019 | Alfonso Llopis (Independent) | Arnold Layus (Lakas) | Vilmer Viloria (NUP) |
| 2022 | Randy A. Ursulam (Lakas) | Arnold Layus (Lakas) | Alniñoson Kevin Timbas (Lakas) |
| 2025 | Randy A. Ursulam (Lakas) | Alniñoson Kevin M. Timbas (Lakas) | Vilmer V. Viloria (Lakas) |

=== 3rd District ===
- City: Tuguegarao
- Municipalities: Amulung, Enrile, Iguig, Peñablanca, Solana, Tuao
- Population (2020): 486,150

| Election year | Member (party) | Member (party) | Member (party) | Member (party) |
|---|---|---|---|---|
| 2004 | Mila Perpetua Catabay-Lauigan (NPC) | Victor Perez (Lakas) | Baylon Calagui (LDP) | Estelita Dayag (Independent) |
| 2007 | Victor Perez (Liberal) | Washington Taguinod (NPC) | Winnoco Abraham (Liberal) | Estelita Dayag (Liberal) |
| 2010 | Victor Perez (Liberal) | Washington Tagunod (Nacionalista) | Winnoco Abraham (Nacionalista) | Mila Perpetua Catabay-Lauigan (Lakas) |
| 2013 | Karen Kaye Turingan (Nacionalista) | Christian Guzman (Liberal) | Winnoco Abraham (Nacionalista) | Mila Perpetua Catabay-Lauigan (NUP) |
| 2016 | Perla Tumaliuan (NUP) | Rosauro Resuello (Liberal) | Karen Kaye Turingan (NUP) | Rodrigo De Asis (Liberal) |
| 2019 | Perla Tumaliuan (NUP) | Rosauro Resuello (PDP–Laban) | Mila Catabay-Lauigan (NUP) | Rodrigo De Asis (PDP–Laban) |
| 2022 | Leonides Fausto (Independent) | Rosauro Resuello (Independent) | Mila Catabay-Lauigan (NPC) | Rodrigo De Asis (Independent) |
| 2025 | Jean Alphonse D. Ponce (Lakas) | Engelbert C. Caronan Jr. (Nacionalista) | Romar F. De Asis (Nacionalista) | Leonides M. Fausto Jr. (Lakas) |
