= Manuel Mamba =

Filipino politician

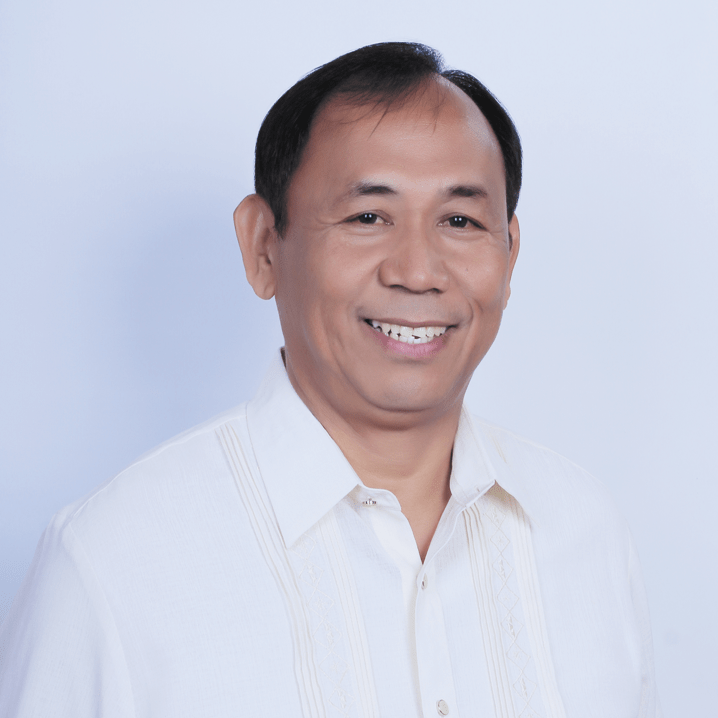

Vice Governor of Cagayan
- Incumbent
- Assumed office June 30, 2025
- Governor: Edgar Aglipay
- Preceded by: Melvin Vargas Jr.

33rd Governor of Cagayan
- In office June 30, 2016 – June 30, 2025
- Vice Governor: Melvin Vargas Jr.
- Preceded by: Alvaro Antonio
- Succeeded by: Edgar Aglipay

Head of Presidential Legislative Liaison Office
- In office February 20, 2012 – October 16, 2015
- President: Benigno Aquino III
- Preceded by: Antonino Roman

Member of the Philippine House of Representatives from Cagayan's 3rd district
- In office June 30, 2001 – June 30, 2010
- Preceded by: Rodolfo Aguinaldo
- Succeeded by: Randolph Ting
- In office June 30, 1995 – June 30, 1998
- Preceded by: Francisco K. Mamba
- Succeeded by: Rodolfo Aguinaldo

Municipal Mayor of Tuao
- In office February 2, 1988 – June 30, 1995

Personal details
- Born: Manuel Noveno Mamba; August 19, 1958 (age 68) Tuao, Cagayan, Philippines
- Party: Nacionalista (2021–present)
- Other political affiliations: Independent (2018–2021); PDP–Laban (2017–2018); Liberal (2004–2017); Lakas (until 2004)
- Spouse: Mabel Villarica
- Education: University of Santo Tomas (BS, M.D)
- Occupation: Doctor, politician

Manuel Noveno Mamba Sr. (born August 19, 1958) is a Filipino physician and politician who is serving as provincial vice governor of Cagayan since 2025 and previously served as governor of Cagayan from 2016 to 2025. He was elected to the House of Representatives of the Philippines, representing the 3rd District of Cagayan. First elected in 1995, he was re-elected in 2001, 2004, and 2007. He was also a municipal mayor of Tuao, Cagayan, from 1988 to 1995. He also served as the Presidential Legislative Liaison Officer under Benigno Aquino III.

== Personal life ==
He is the son of Congressman Francisco K. Mamba Sr. and Estela Noveno-Mamba. He is married to Atty. Mabel Villarica–Mamba, former chairperson and chief executive officer of the National Youth Commission and former director of the Philippine Charity Sweepstakes Office. They have two sons.

He and his brothers, William and Francisco Jr., served as mayor of Tuao, Cagayan. Another brother, then Solana mayor Leonardo, was assassinated while campaigning for Congress in 1992.

A graduate of the University of Santo Tomas, Mamba is a physician by profession. He became licensed in 1983.

== Political career ==
=== As provincial board member and municipal mayor ===
Mamba began his political career in 1987 when he became a member of the Cagayan Provincial Board. He was the mayor of his hometown, Tuao, from 1988 to 1995.

=== As district representative ===
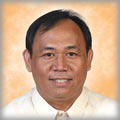
Mamba official portrait during the 14th Congress.

Mamba represented the third district of Cagayan in the House of the Representatives within four terms (1995–1998, 2001–2010).

=== Aquino cabinet ===
During the administration of President Benigno Aquino III, Mamba was appointed in 2013 as a member of his Cabinet. He served as the Presidential Legislative Liaison Officer and was also as the Presidential Adviser on Legislative Affairs.

During the 2013 Philippine general election on 13 May, Mamba accused then-governor Alvaro Antonio of firing an AK-47 at his convoy in Alcala while en route to a function in Manila. At the time, Mamba's brother William lost his bid to unseat Antonio for the governorship. Antonio denied the accusation.

=== As provincial governor ===
In 2010, Mamba unsuccessfully ran for governor of Cagayan, losing to reelectionist Alvaro Antonio.

In 2016, Mamba, ran under Liberal Party and was elected Cagayan governor. He was re-elected in 2019 as an independent.

In the 2022 elections, he filed his candidacy under the Nacionalista Party and ran and won against PDP–Laban candidate, Ma. Zarah Rose Lara.

Under his administration, he initiated programs including the Cagayan Development Agenda (Caganda 2025), "No Barangay, No Town Left Behind", and the Cagayan River Restoration Project. Meanwhile, for his efforts to maintain peace and order in the province, in 2019, Mamba was recognized as a Kapayapaan Awardee, while the Provincial Government of Cagayan became a National Awardee in the Anti-Drug Abuse Council Performance Audit.

==== Opposition to US military presence ====
Mamba strongly opposed the expansion of US military presence under the Enhanced Defense Cooperation Agreement, which escalated under the administration of President Bongbong Marcos and opened the Camilo Osias Naval Base in Santa Ana and Cagayan North International Airport in Lal-lo to American military personnel in 2023, citing the risk of the Philippines being dragged into a wider conflict with China.

=== 2025 election ===
Mamba was elected vice governor of Cagayan in the 2025 Philippine general election, with Edgar Aglipay as his running mate. The League of Municipal Mayors whose members were dissenting against Mamba's stance on the American military presence in Cagayan were included in his electoral slate.

== Controversies ==
=== Illegal gambling ===
In 2005, Mamba admitted that he and his family were involved in illegal gambling, particularly the numbers game known as jueteng, until 1992. He has since become a critic of the game.

=== Election complaints ===
In 2001, an election protest against Mamba was filed by his rival, outgoing Rep. Rodolfo Aguinaldo, with the House of Representatives Electoral Tribunal due to accusations of vote-buying and terrorism. Aguinaldo died later in an ambush.

His re-election in 2007 became the subject of complaint of then Tuguegarao mayor Randolph Ting as the Parish Pastoral Council for Responsible Voting reported discrepancies in election results from certain precincts in Tuao. Mamba, as well as his allies in the province, allegedly led the tallies by big margins.

In 2016, one of his opponents, Cristina Antonio, filed an election protest against Mamba on allegations of massive fraud in the May elections, but was later dismissed by the Commission on Elections (COMELEC) Second Division as it was declared "insufficient in form and content."

Mamba, who had been re-elected in May 2022, was later disqualified at least twice from the gubernatorial elections, both for violation of the 45-day election ban on public fund use. The first was through a resolution by the COMELEC Second Division, issued in December 2022. The petition was filed by his opponent, Zara Lara. Mamba was the second incumbent governor to be given such order, after Noel Rosal of Albay, who was disqualified with finality in November over a similar offense. The case, however, was dismissed by the COMELEC en banc through its resolution issued on March 6, 2023, citing lack of jurisdiction, provided that once a winning candidate has been proclaimed, any petition for the disqualification is prohibited by the existing laws; only to be overturned by the Supreme Court on April 22, 2024, citing grave abuse of discretion by the commission, with its reopening for its merits being ordered.

On April 24, the COMELEC First Division ruled to disqualify Mamba in a separate case filed by a different petitioner, which also cited violations of public spending during his reelection campaign in 2022. Mamba said that he would appeal the decision and stay in office as governor pending a final decision. The disqualification was upheld by the COMELEC en banc on May 31, 2025, allowing Mamba's removal and his vice governor, Melvin Vargas Jr., to take office as governor.

In July 2026, Mamba was ordered suspended as vice governor for 90 days by a court in Batac, Ilocos Norte pending the result of his trial over the graft case that originated from the election spending complaint filed against him by Lara.

=== Contempt charges ===
On 24 August 2023, Mamba was detained by the House of Representatives for contempt after he and other officials of the Cagayan provincial government failed to attend a committee hearing regarding the allegations of electoral spending against him. Later in the day, the Supreme Court issued a restraining order against his detention, and he was released by the House that evening after apologizing to the chamber. In February 2024, the Supreme Court fined Mamba and his counsel Macalintal Law Office for indirect contempt under Rule 71, Section 3(c) and (d) of the Rules of Court.

=== Cyberlibel charges ===
In 2025, Mamba was convicted and sentenced to six years' imprisonment for cyberlibel following a case filed by Presidential Chief Legal Counsel Juan Ponce Enrile. Mamba filed a pending appeal, saying that he had only quoted from a newspaper editorial.

=== Assault ===
In 2017, Mamba and his aides physically assaulted an employee of the provincial capitol on the nape for allegedly disrespecting him during a flag ceremony. The victim subsequently apologized, saying that he had left the ceremony after thinking it had concluded.

Political offices
Preceded by Melvin Vargas Jr.	Vice Governor of Cagayan; 2025–present	Incumbent
Preceded by Alvaro Antonio	Governor of Cagayan; 2016–2025	Succeeded by Edgar Aglipay
House of Representatives of the Philippines
Preceded by Rodolfo Aguinaldo	Member of the House of Representatives from Cagayan's 3rd district 2001–2010	Succeeded by Randolph Ting
Preceded by Francisco K. Mamba	Member of the House of Representatives from Cagayan's 3rd district 1995–1998	Succeeded by Rodolfo Aguinaldo
