= Melvin Vargas Jr. =

Filipino politician (born 1981)

The Honourable Melvin Vargas Jr.
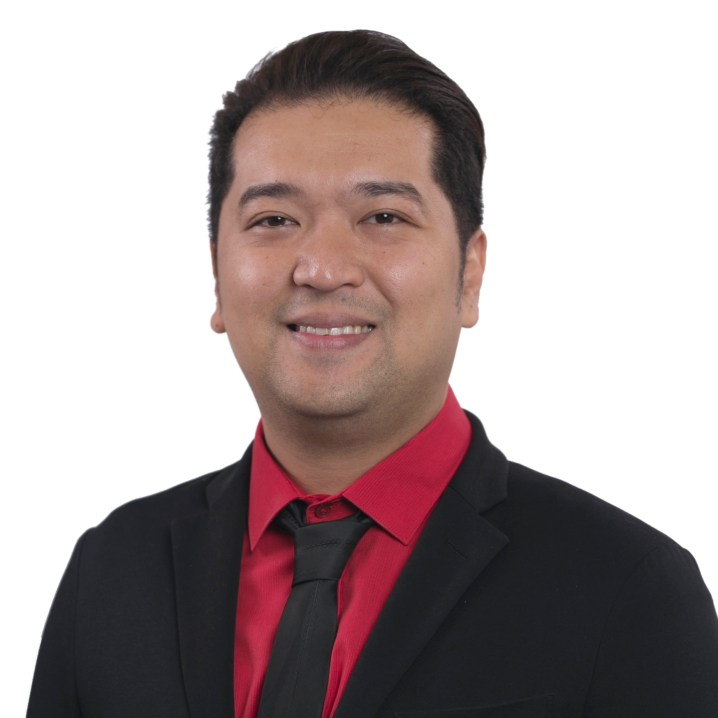

Vice Governor of Cagayan
- In office June 30, 2016 – June 30, 2025
- Governor: Manuel Mamba
- Preceded by: Leonides Fausto
- Succeeded by: Manuel Mamba

Member of the Cagayan Provincial Board from the 2nd district
- In office June 30, 2007 – June 30, 2016

Personal details
- Born: Melvin Kamatoy Vargas Jr. June 11, 1981 (age 44) Abulug, Cagayan, Philippines
- Citizenship: Philippines
- Party: PFP (2024-present)
- Other political affiliations: PDP (2021–2024); UNA (2015–2021); NUP (2012–2015); Lakas–CMD (2008–2012); KAMPI (2007-2008)
- Relations: Baby Aline Vargas-Alfonso (aunt); Florencio Vargas (grandfather)
- Parent: Melvin Vargas Sr.

Melvin "Boy" Kamatoy Vargas Jr. (born June 11, 1981), also known as Boy Vargas, is a Filipino politician who served as vice governor of Cagayan from 2016 to 2025.

== Family ==
He is the son of former Cagayan Governor Melvin Vargas Sr. and grandson of former Representative Florencio Vargas.

== Career ==
From 2007 to 2016, he served as board member of Cagayan from the 2nd District. In the 2016 election he won the position as Vice Governor of Cagayan opposing Mila Catabay-Lauigan, incumbent board member of Cagayan's 3rd District and Ignacio Taruc.

In 2018, he reacted to incumbent Cagayan Governor Manuel Mamba to run for Vice Governor because Mamba said that for his second term he would run for Vice Governor. Although Vargas said that it was an honor to face Mamba for the Vice Gubernatorial race since he is known as a veteran in politics.

When the Cagayan provincial budget was delayed, Mamba filed an administrative complaint against the provincial board for delaying the passage of the province's budget in 2017, as bickering among officials dragged on for the second straight year.

After Mamba was removed from office by the Commission on Elections on May 31, 2025 for violations of electoral campaign spending, Vargas was designated acting governor.

Political offices
Preceded by Leonides Fausto	Former Vice Governor of Cagayan; 2016–2025	Succeeded by Manuel Mamba
