= Ijang =

Terraced hillforts in Batanes, Philippines

Ijangs are the terraced hillfort settlements of the Ivatan people built on hill tops and ridges in the Batanes Islands of the Philippines. These high rocky formations can serve as fortresses or refuge against the enemies of the Ivatan people.

Savidug Ijang in perspective view as seen from its northeastern border

Savidug Ijang, Sabtang

== Background ==
In 1994, Eusebio Dizon, the deputy director of the National Museum of the Philippines, went to Batanes with his team for an archaeological project. They found a triangular-shaped hill in Savidug, a town in Sabtang. These structures were called ijang. Ijangs are similar to the gusuku castles found in Okinawa, Japan. Aside from both of them being strategically built in high places, 12th-century Sung-type ceramics and Chinese beads and other artefactual materials recovered from an ijang were dated at almost the same time as the foundations of the Okinawan castles beginning from circa 1200 CE.

The Ivatan traditionally lived in the ijang which were fortified mountain areas and drank sugar-cane wine, or palek. They used gold as currency and had expertise in seafaring and boatbuilding. They produced a thriving agriculture-based industry.

== Functions ==
Based on oral history and tradition, pre-Hispanic Ivatans were divided into small clans that lived not far from the sea. During clan wars, those attacked climbed for safety to the tops of the ijangs where they defended themselves by throwing stones at the enemy below. The tops of the ijangs today are still full of stones—the primitive ammunition of the people. Building a shelter atop the ijang became necessary when fighting continued long for some time. Ijangs were first described by the English freebooter Captain William Dampier when he visited the island of Ivuhos in 1687. Today, there are still traces of such ancient dwellings, including stone posts standing or lying where the Ivatans left them when they abandoned their pagan way of life for Christianity in the late 18th century.

== Spanish Colonial Era ==
In 1783, the Spanish claimed Batanes as part of the Philippines under the auspices of Governor-General José Basco y Vargas. The Bashi Channel had come to be increasingly used by English East India Company ships and the Spanish authorities brought the islands under their direct administration to prevent them from falling under British control. However, the Ivatan remained on their ijangs, or mountain fortresses.

In 1790, Governor Guerrero decreed that Ivatans were to leave their ijang and live in the lowlands, thereby giving them more people to tax. Basco and Ivana were the first towns that implemented this decree.

== See also ==
- Dap-ay
- Pā
- Nan Madol
