= Dap-ay =

Ceremonial platform of Cordilleran cultures in the Philippines

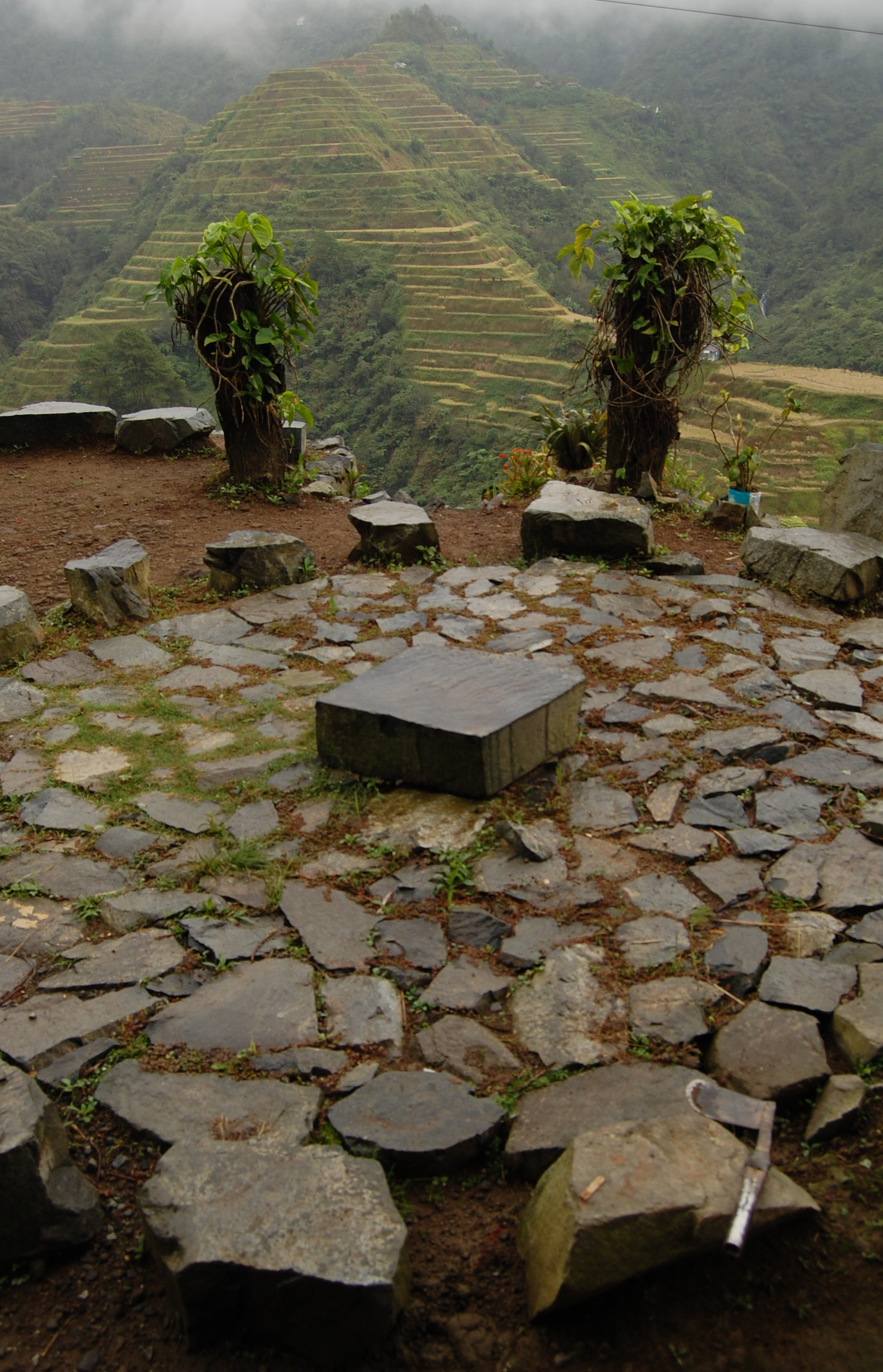
A dap-ay in Banaue, Ifugao Province

A dap-ay (Kankanaey pronunciation: [dʌp̚ˈʔai̯]), ato, or ator (Bontoc) is a paved raised ceremonial platform ringed with stone seats and with a central fireplace among the Cordilleran cultures in the northern Philippines. It primarily serves as a venue for meetings and public forums between the council of elders. It is the social, religious, and political center of a certain group of families within a village. The term itself is also used to refer to the indigenous process of decision-making by the elders, or to the council of elders themselves. Dap-ay also usually contain traditional dormitories for young boys in the village.

Among the Ilocano people, a dap-ayan or dap-ay refers to a similar gathering place used for discussions by village leaders.

== Function ==
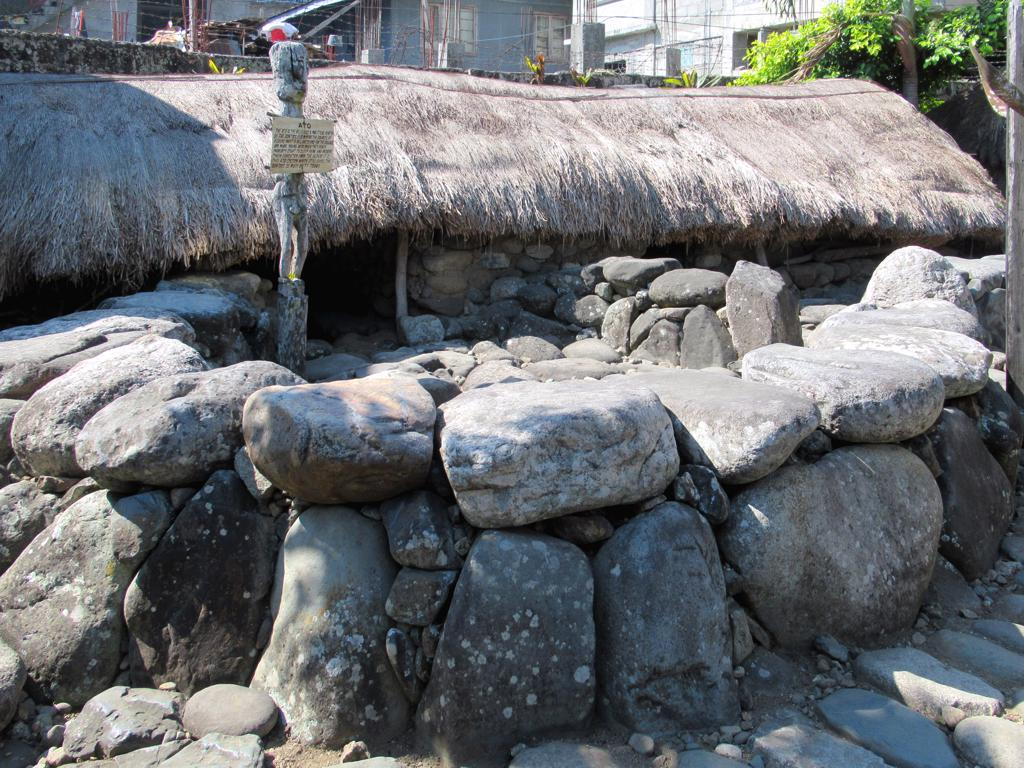
An ato in the Bontoc Museum in Bontoc, Mountain Province showing the attached dormitory and a standing bulul figure

=== Political ===
The primary function of the dap-ay is as the meeting place for the council of elders. The council serves as the governing body of the community, with the authority to settle disputes or conflicts internally or with another village, pass judgement and punishments, issue laws, coordinate rituals and farming activities, and make decisions that affect the community as a whole.

The council of elders is informally elected and unpaid, with members chosen by age and experience. However, each adult male member of a community can participate in the council deliberations if they choose to.

The number of dap-ay in a village depends on its population and age. Each village usually has several. The number of families that a dap-ay includes can range from as little as 6 to as many as 60. Membership in a dap-ay is voluntary. Newly married couples will usually join the dap-ay of their parents.

The dap-ay in a given village usually take turns each year performing specialized functions for the village as a whole, which can range from religious sacrifices to planting fields, repairing irrigation ditches and paddy field walls, or maintaining trails. Members of the dap-ay are expected to equally share the expenses and labor requirements of these activities.

Dap-ay is also utilized by its members for arranging a mutual exchange of labor (called dang-as), for work that can not be done alone (like repairing the dikes in their rice terraces). The member requesting the service will usually offer an animal sacrifice (like a certain number of chickens) in exchange, which are used in the preparation rituals and eaten by the participants afterwards. Once arranged through the elders, all of the adult members of the dap-ay will devote one or two days in completing the task.

=== Religious ===
Various rituals are held in the dap-ay. The most notable being the Begnas (rice thanksgiving rituals of the Kankanaey).

=== War ===
The severed heads of defeated warriors from other communities are usually mounted on poles (padao in Kankanaey) in the dap-ay.

=== Dormitories ===
The dap-ay also includes attached huts (abong in Kankanaey) which are used as dormitories for unmarried boys and old men. These buildings were also utilized as a place for storing weapons, a barracks for training warriors, and a school for teaching the laws, histories, and traditions of the village.

The equivalent communal dormitory for unmarried girls is known as the ebgan (Kankanaey) or olog (Bontoc). Unlike the dap-ay, the ebgan did not host rituals or meetings, but served as a place for girls to learn various skills. It also served as the place for courtship.

Children were expected to sleep in these dormitories as soon as they stopped requiring parental support for feeding, locomotion, or bodily functions (usually at the age of seven or eight, ten in modern times). It is also during this transition that children begin wearing clothing (the bahag and alampay) for modesty. They still return to their parents' house to eat and assist with the chores during daytime.

=== Social ===
During daytime (usually in the early mornings and in the evenings), dap-ay (and ebgan) also functioned as village centers where adult members of the community can interact with each other or do communal activities. This is also the period where the children of the communal dormitories learn about village law and morality via interaction with their elders.

== Other traditions ==
Among the Ilocano people, a "dap-ay" or "dap-ayan" refers to a similar gathering place used for discussions by village leaders. Unlike the Cordilleran dap-ay, however, a dap-ayan is a simple roofed structure. In modern times, dap-ayan are commonly used as a community center for storing produce, as well as showcasing the products of a community.

== See also ==
- Ijang
- Indigenous Philippine shrines and sacred grounds
- Barangay hall
- Marae
- Heiau
