= Batanes =

- Province
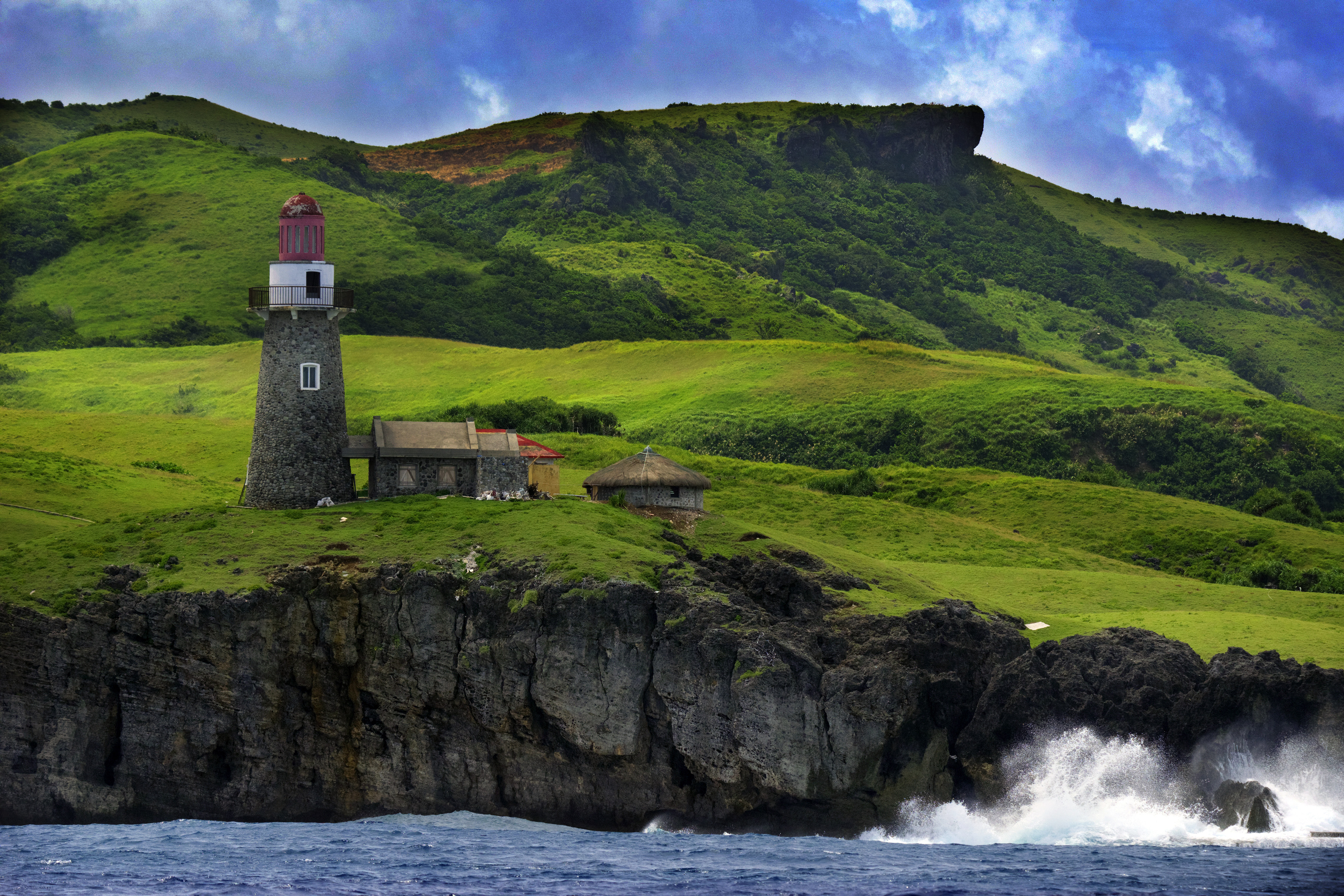
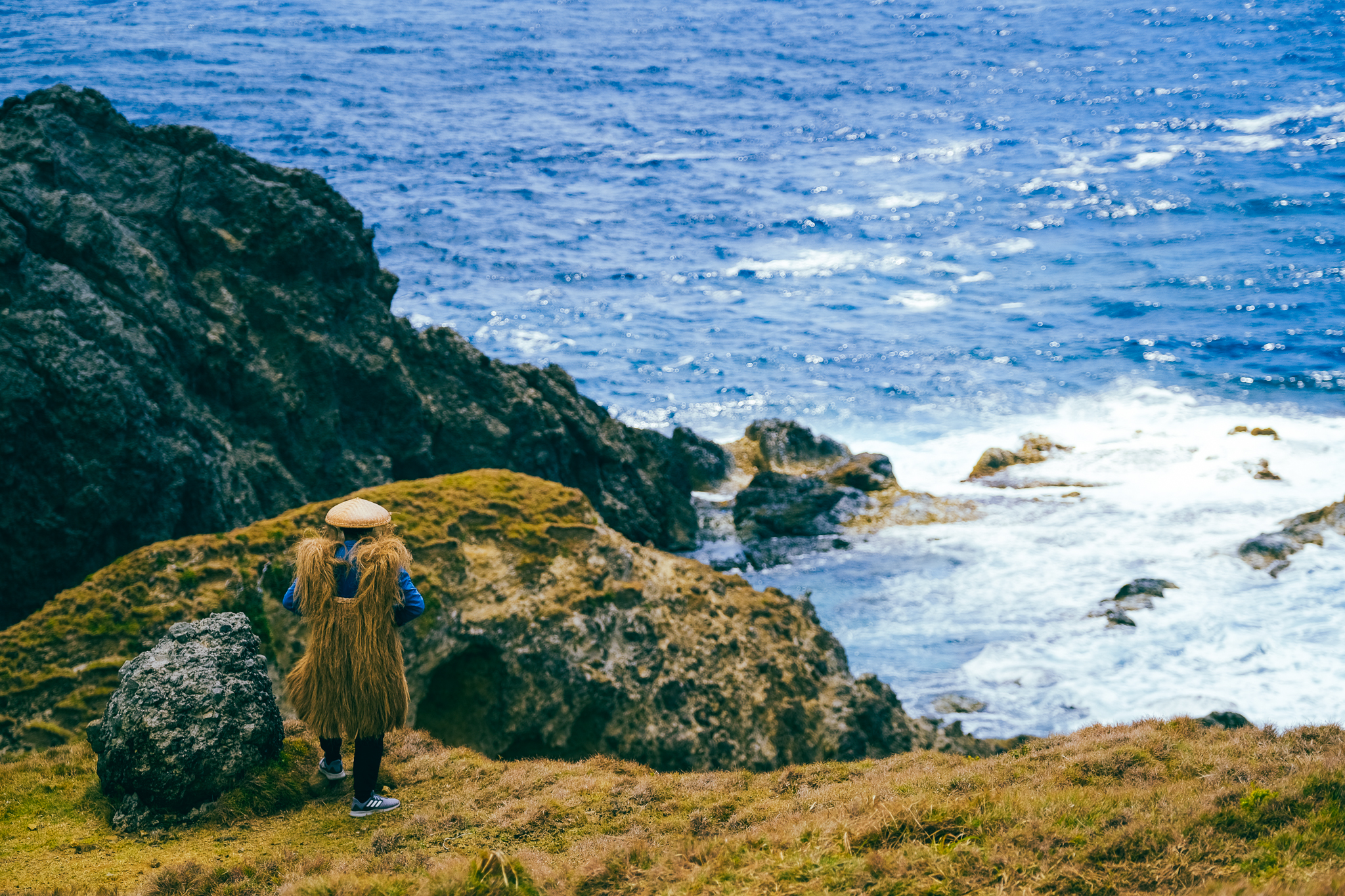
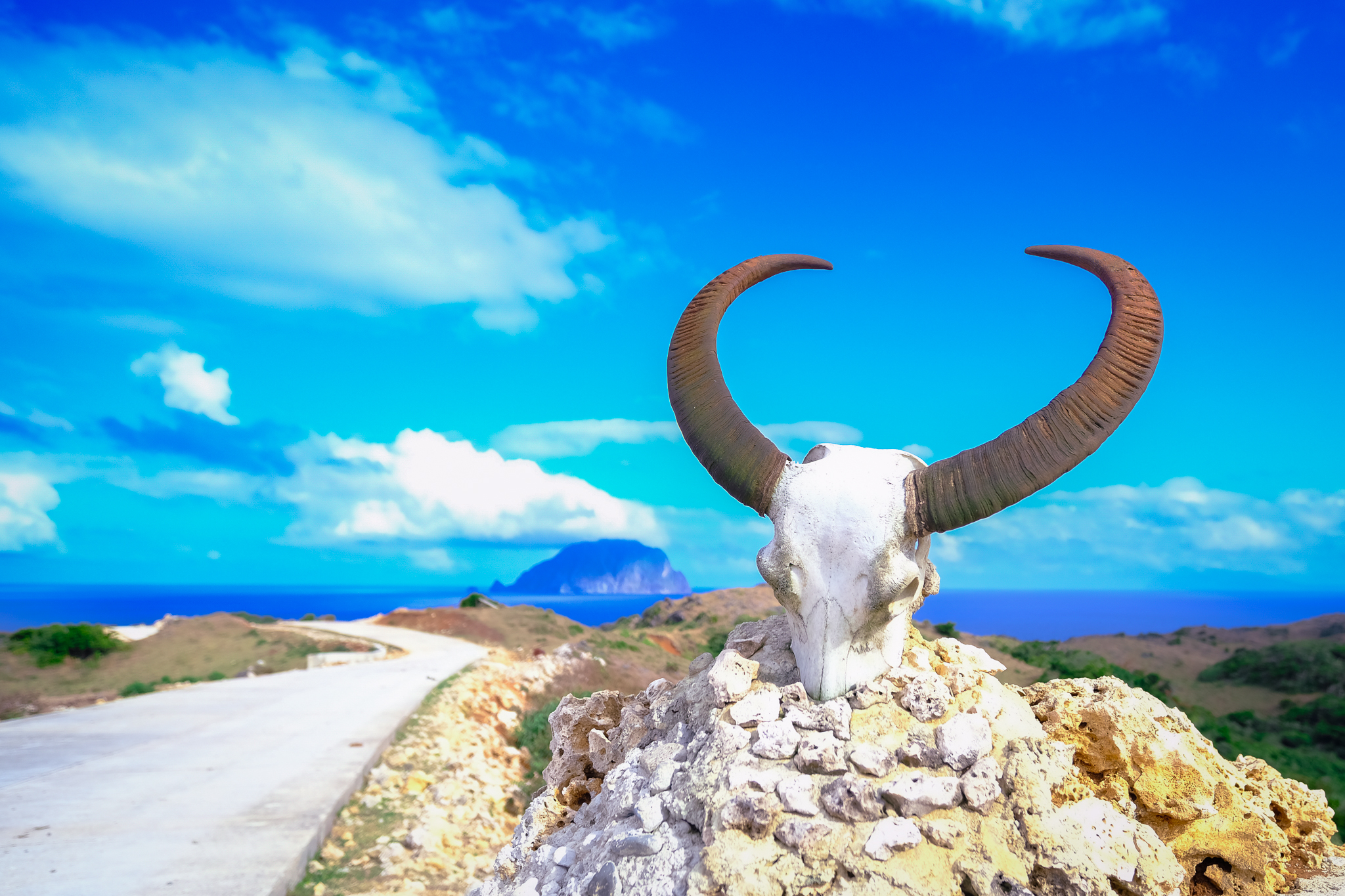
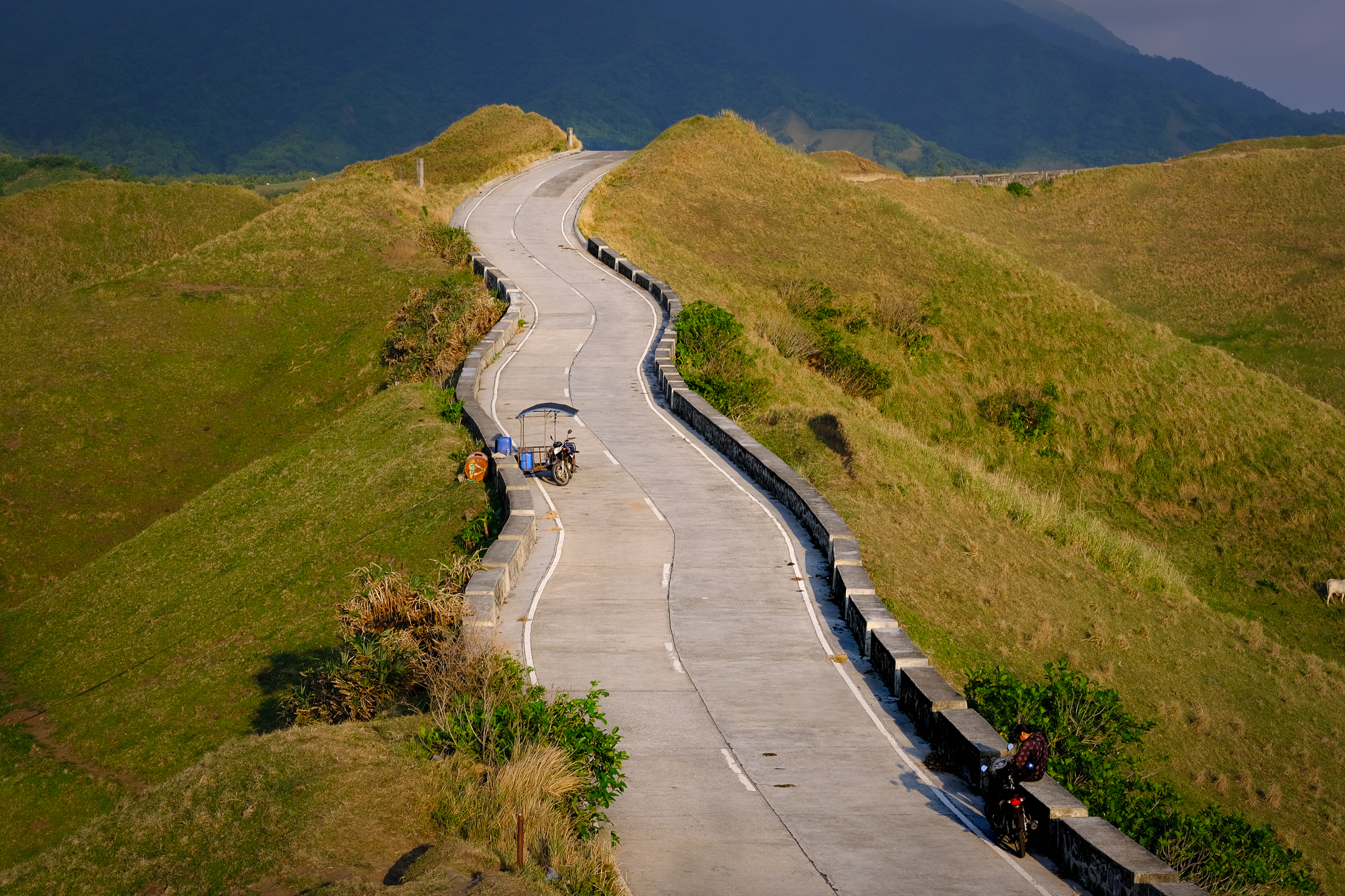
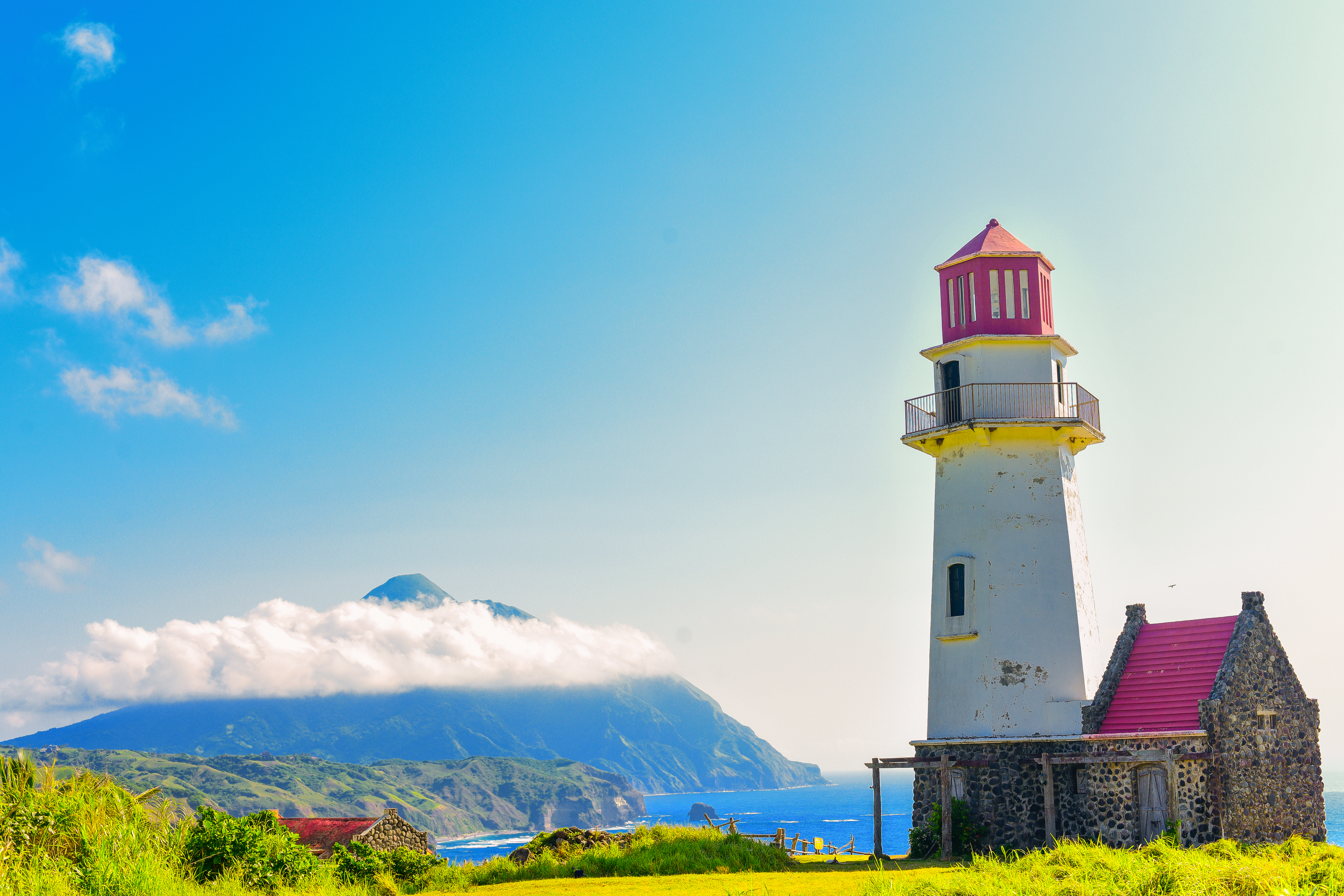
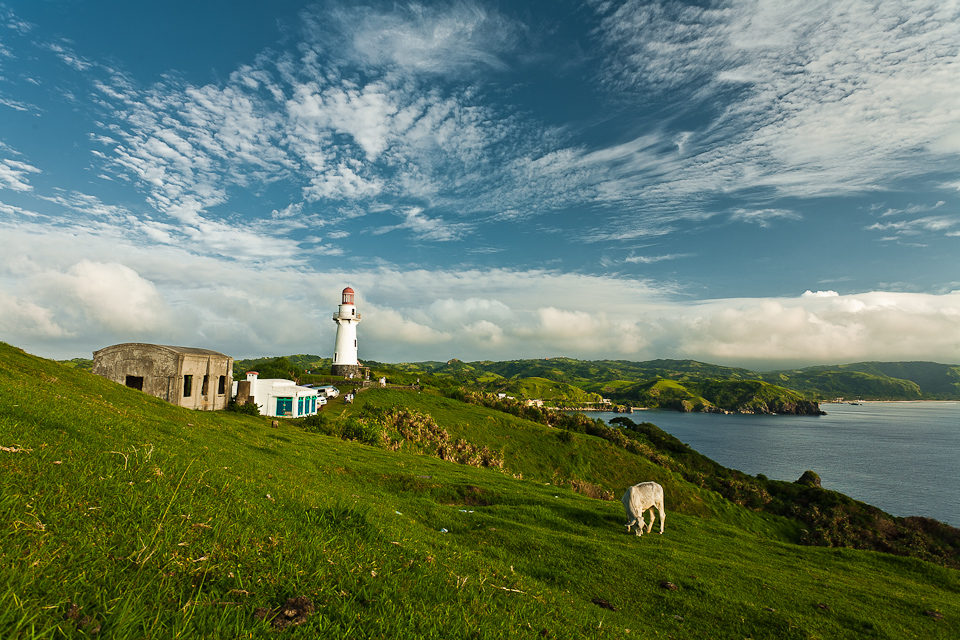
- (from top: left to right) Lighthouse in Sabtang Island, Chawa View Deck in Sabtang, Port Tachimos, Vayang Rolling Hills, Tayid Lighthouse and Rakuh A Payaman

- Flag Seal
- [] Beautiful Batanes Isles
- Location in the Philippines
- Coordinates: 20°35′N 121°54′E
- Country: Philippines
- Region: Cagayan Valley
- Founded: June 26, 1783
- Sub-province of Cagayan: August 20, 1907
- Reestablishment as province: May 20, 1909
- Capital and largest municipality: Basco

Government
  - Governor: Ronald P. Aguto Jr. (PFP)
  - Vice Governor: Jonathan Enrique V. Nanud Jr. (PFP)
  - Representative: Vacant
  - Legislature: Batanes Provincial Board
  - Electorate: 13,655 voters (2025)

Area
  - Total: 203.22 km^{2} (78.46 sq mi)
  - Rank: 81st out of 82
- Highest elevation (Mount Iraya): 1,009 m (3,310 ft)

Population (2024 census)
  - Total: 18,937
  - Rank: 82nd out of 82
  - Density: 93.185/km^{2} (241.35/sq mi)
  - Rank: 73rd out of 82
  - Households: 5,547
- Demonym: Batanense

Divisions
  - Independent cities: 0
  - Component cities: 0
  - Municipalities: 6: Basco; Itbayat; Ivana; Mahatao; Sabtang; Uyugan
  - Barangays: 29
  - Districts: Legislative district of Batanes

Economy
  - Income class: 4th provincial income class
  - Poverty incidence: 3.3% (2023)
  - Revenue: ₱ 691.2 million (2024)
  - Assets: ₱ 2,104 million (2024)
  - Expenditure: ₱ 600.3 million (2024)
  - Liabilities: ₱ 463.9 million (2024)
- Time zone: UTC+8 (PHT)
- PSGC: 0200900000
- IDD : area code: +63 (0)78
- ISO 3166 code: PH-BTN
- Spoken languages: Ivatan; Itbayaten; Isamurongen; Ilocano; Tagalog; English

Batanes, officially the Province of Batanes, (Note: Ivatan: Provinsiya nu Batanes; Ilocano: Probinsia ti Batanes; Filipino: Lalawigan ng Batanes, IPA: [bɐˈtanes]) is an archipelagic province in the Philippines, administratively part of the Cagayan Valley region. It is the northernmost province in the Philippines, and the smallest, both in population and land area. The capital is Basco, located on the island of Batan, and is also the most populous municipality in the province.

The island group is located approximately 162 kilometers (101 mi) north of the Luzon mainland and about 190 kilometers (120 mi) south of Taiwan (Pingtung County). Batanes is separated from the Babuyan Islands of Cagayan Province by the Balintang Channel, and from Taiwan by the Bashi Channel.

== Etymology and nomenclature ==
The name Batanes is the Spanish collective name of the islands. It is the Spanish plural form of Batan, the native Ivatan name of the main populated island of the group.

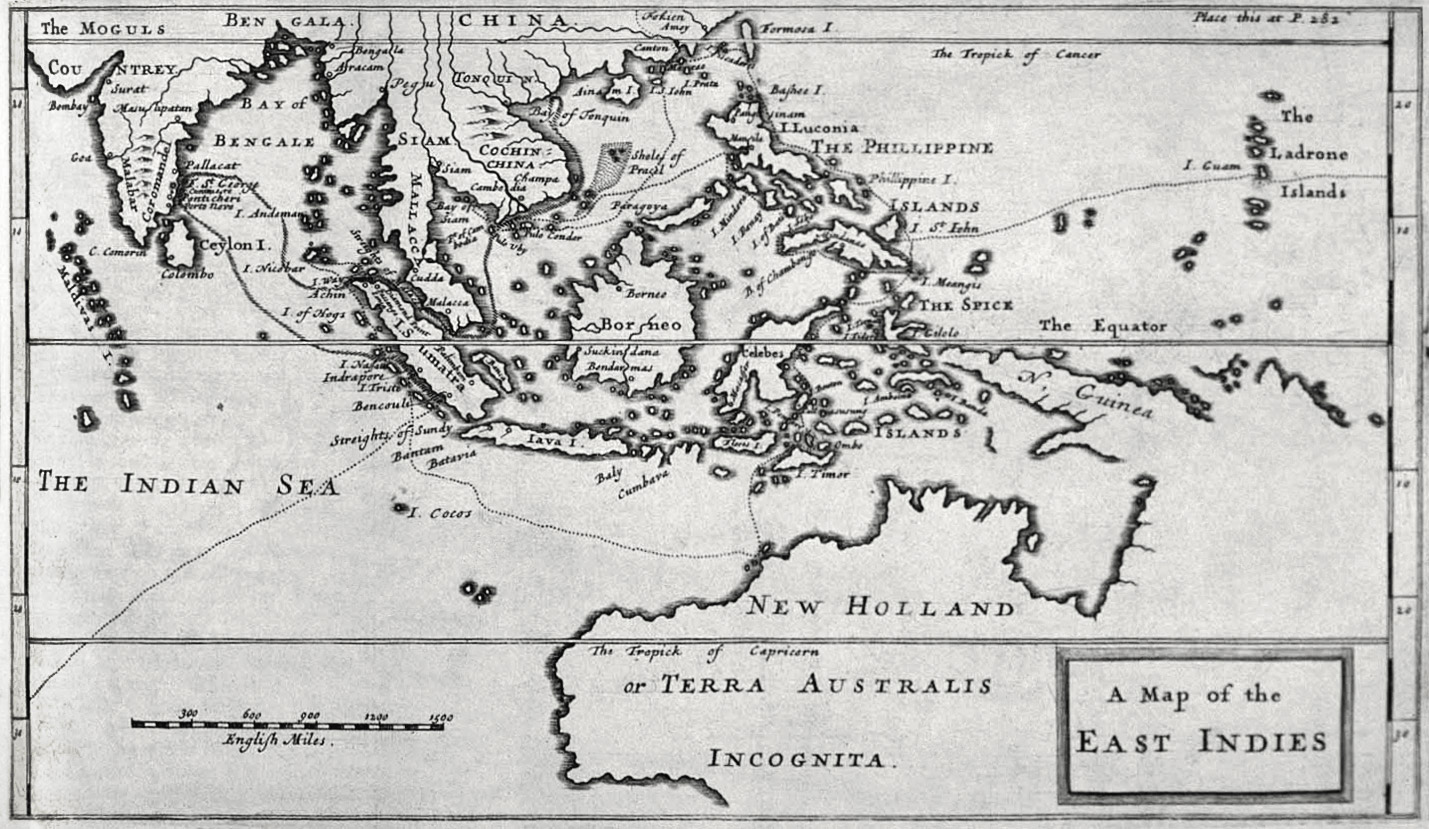
A map of the East Indies from William Dampier's New Voyage Round the World (1697), showing the "Bashee I." (Batanes Islands)

Older European sources may refer to the Batanes Islands as the "Bashi" Islands (also spelled variously as "Basi", "Bassi", "Basy", "Bashi", "Baschi", "Bachi", "Bashee", and "Bachee"), a name still retained by the Bashi Channel. This name was given collectively to the islands of Batanes by the English explorer William Dampier in 1687. The name is derived from the indigenous alcoholic drink basi of the people of Northern Luzon, specifically the drink palek of the native Ivatan people of the Batanes islands.

Their common drink is water; as it is of all other Indians: Besides which they make a sort of drink with the juice of the sugar-cane, which they boil, and put some small black sort of berries among it. When it is well-boiled, they put it into great jars and it is presently fit to drink. This is an excellent liquor, and very much like English Beer, both in colour and taste. It is very strong, and I do believe very wholesome: for our men, who drank briskly of it all the day of several weeks, were frequently drunk with it, and never sick after it. The natives brought a vast deal of it every day to those aboard and ashore: for some of our men were ashore at work on Bashee Island: which island they gave that name to from their drinking this liquor there; that being the name which the natives call'd this liquor by: and as they sold it to our men, very cheap, so they did not spare to drink it as freely. And indeed from the plenty of this liquor, and their plentiful use of it, our Men call'd all these Islands, the Bashee Islands."

— William Dampier, Dampier's Voyages (1906)

== History ==
=== Early history ===
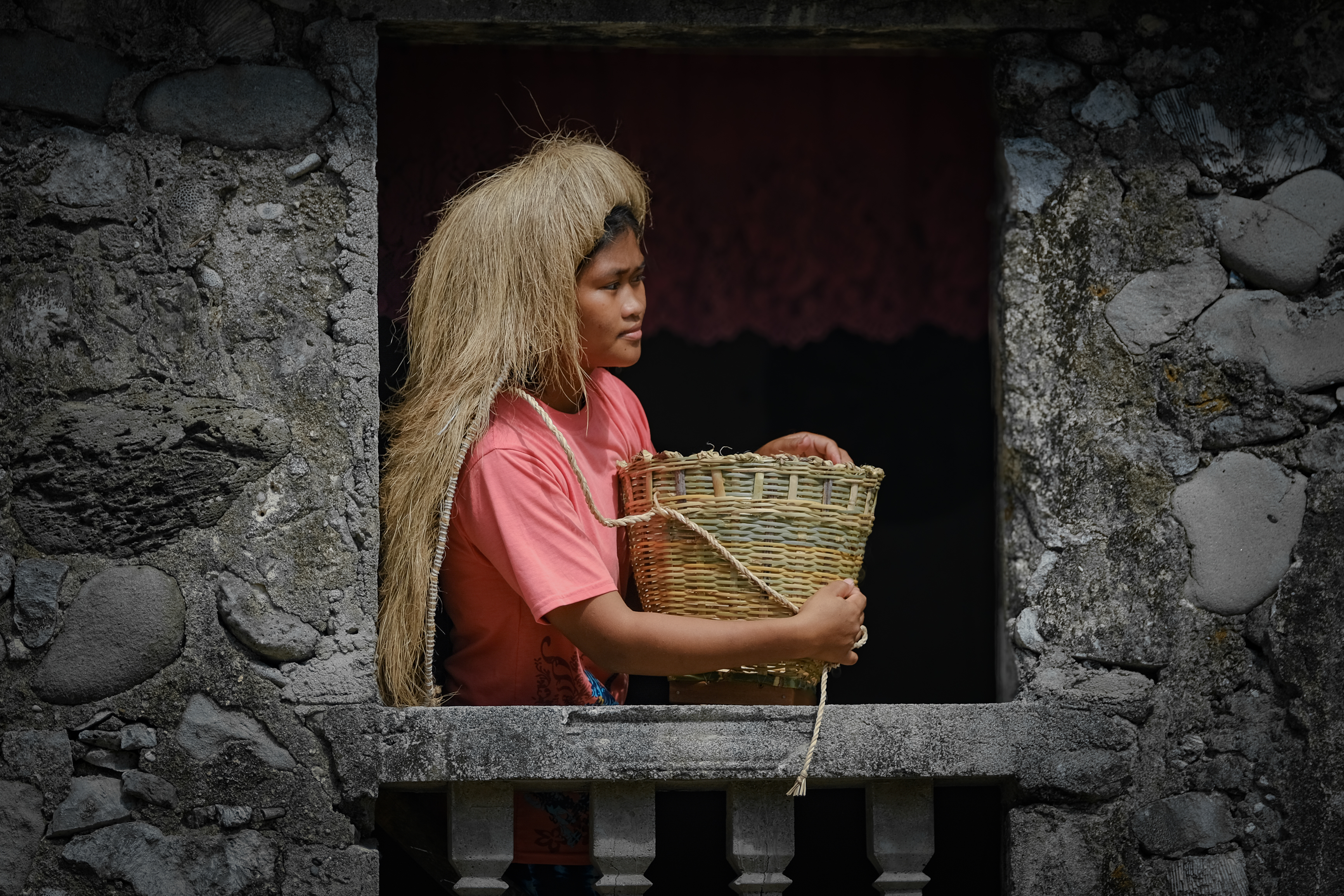
An Ivatan woman with traditional vakul headgear

The ancestors of the native Ivatan people descended from Austronesians who migrated to the islands 4,000 years ago during the Neolithic period Austronesian Expansion. They lived in fortified mountain areas called idjangs and drank sugar-cane wine, or palek. They used gold as currency and were farmers, seafarers and boatbuilders. Batanes was a major site for the Maritime Jade Road, one of the most extensive sea-based trade networks of a single geological material in the prehistoric world, operating for 3,000 years from 2000 BCE to 1000 CE.

=== Spanish colonial era ===
In 1687, the British explorer, privateer, and naturalist William Dampier visited the islands and named them in honour of prominent Dutch and British figures. Itbayat was named "Orange Isle" after William of Orange. Batan was named "Grafton Isle" after Henry FitzRoy, 1st Duke of Grafton. Sabtang Isle was named "Monmouth Isle" after James Scott, 1st Duke of Monmouth. During his stay in August and September 1687, Dampier made valuable observations about settlement types and subsistence of the inhabitants of the Batanes. He mentioned the existence of terraced and defended settlements on elevated terrain (now known as ijang) and listed various types of types of tubers and vegetables, and pigs and goats as common food sources, but notably no wet rice or cattle.

In 1783, the Spanish claimed Batanes as part of the Philippines under the rule of Governor-General José Basco y Vargas. Batanes was ruled as part of the Provincia de Cagayan. The Bashi Channel was increasingly used by English East India Company ships and the Spanish authorities brought the islands under their direct administration to keep them from falling under British control. The Ivatan remained on their idjang castle-fortresses for some time. In 1790, Governor Guerrero decreed that Ivatans were to live in the lowlands and leave their remote idjang. In response, the mangpus, or indigenous Ivatan leaders, headed by the Ivatan hero Aman Dangat, revolted against the Spanish invaders.

Using guns, the Spanish ended the revolution, killing Aman Dangat and several other Ivatan leaders. Basco and Ivana were the first towns established under full Spanish control. Mahatao was then administered by Basco, while Uyugan and Sabtang, by Ivana. Itbayat was not organized until the 1850s, its coast being a ridge. Soon, Ilocanos came to the islands and integrated with the local population.

Roads, ports, bridges, churches and government buildings were built in this time. Limestone technology used by the Spanish spread to the islands, making bridges strong and fortified. Some of these bridges still remain at Ivana and Mahatao. By 1890, many Ivatans were in Manila, and became ilustrados, who then brought home with them the revolutionary ideas of the Katipunan. These Ivatans, who were then discontented with Spanish rule, killed the ruling General Fortea and declared the end of Spanish rule.

=== American colonial era ===
Aerial photograph of the downtown area of Basco taken by the United States Army Air Forces as part of their aerial survey on the Philippines during the latter part of the American colonial era

Toward the end of the Spanish administration, Batanes was made a part of Cagayan. Due to historical reasons from that time, some segments of Taiwan society argue that the islands should not belong to the Philippines. Batanes was created as a sub-province of Cagayan on August 20, 1907, with the approval of Act No. 1693. On May 20, 1909, the new American authorities organized it into an independent province, with the approval of Act No. 1952. During this time, additional public schools were constructed and more Ivatan became aware of their place in the Philippines.

In 1920, the first wireless telegraph was installed, followed by an airfield in 1930. New roads were constructed and the Batanes High School was instituted around this time as well.

=== Japanese occupation ===
Because of their strategic location, the islands were one of the first points occupied by the invading Japanese imperial forces at the outbreak of the Pacific War. On the morning of December 8, 1941, the Batan Task Force from Taiwan landed on the Batan Islands, which became the first American territory occupied by the Japanese. The objective of the invasion - to secure the small airfield outside Basco - was accomplished without resistance. Japanese fighters from Basco took part in the raid on Clark Air Base the following day. Over the next several days, the success of the Japanese bombing of Clark Field rendered a base at Basco unnecessary, and on December 10, 1941, the naval combat force was withdrawn to participate in the invasion of Camiguin.

As part of an administrative reorganization, the province of Batanes was downgraded to a municipality of Cagayan from 1942 to 1944. Upon its restoration, Victor de Padua, an Ilocano who was one of the first School Superintendents on Batan, was made Provincial Governor. Early in 1945, the island was liberated by the Philippine Commonwealth forces of the 1st and 12th Infantry Divisions of the Philippine Commonwealth Army.

=== Philippine independence and contemporary era ===
Philippine independence saw the restoration of Batanes as an independent province, and also gradually restored its connections to the rest of the Philippines, which had been largely severed by the Japanese destruction of infrastructure during the war.

Batanes was briefly marred by political violence during the 1969 presidential elections, when the Philippine Constabulary's Special Forces allowed motorcycle-riding goons dubbed the "Suzuki boys" to secure the victory of Rufino Antonio Jr., an ally of President Ferdinand Marcos, as representative of the Lone District of Batanes in the House of Representatives of the Philippines through a campaign of terror and intimidation. The resulting outcry led to the Supreme Court decrying the "rape of democracy" in the province, and annulled Antonio's victory in 1970 in favor of his rival, Jorge Abad.

In 1984, Pacita Abad, the foremost Ivatan visual artist, became the first woman to be awarded the Ten Outstanding Young Men (TOYM) award, breaking 25 years of male dominance. In her acceptance speech, she said, "it was long overdue that Filipina women were recognized, as the Philippines was full of outstanding women" and referred proudly to her mother.

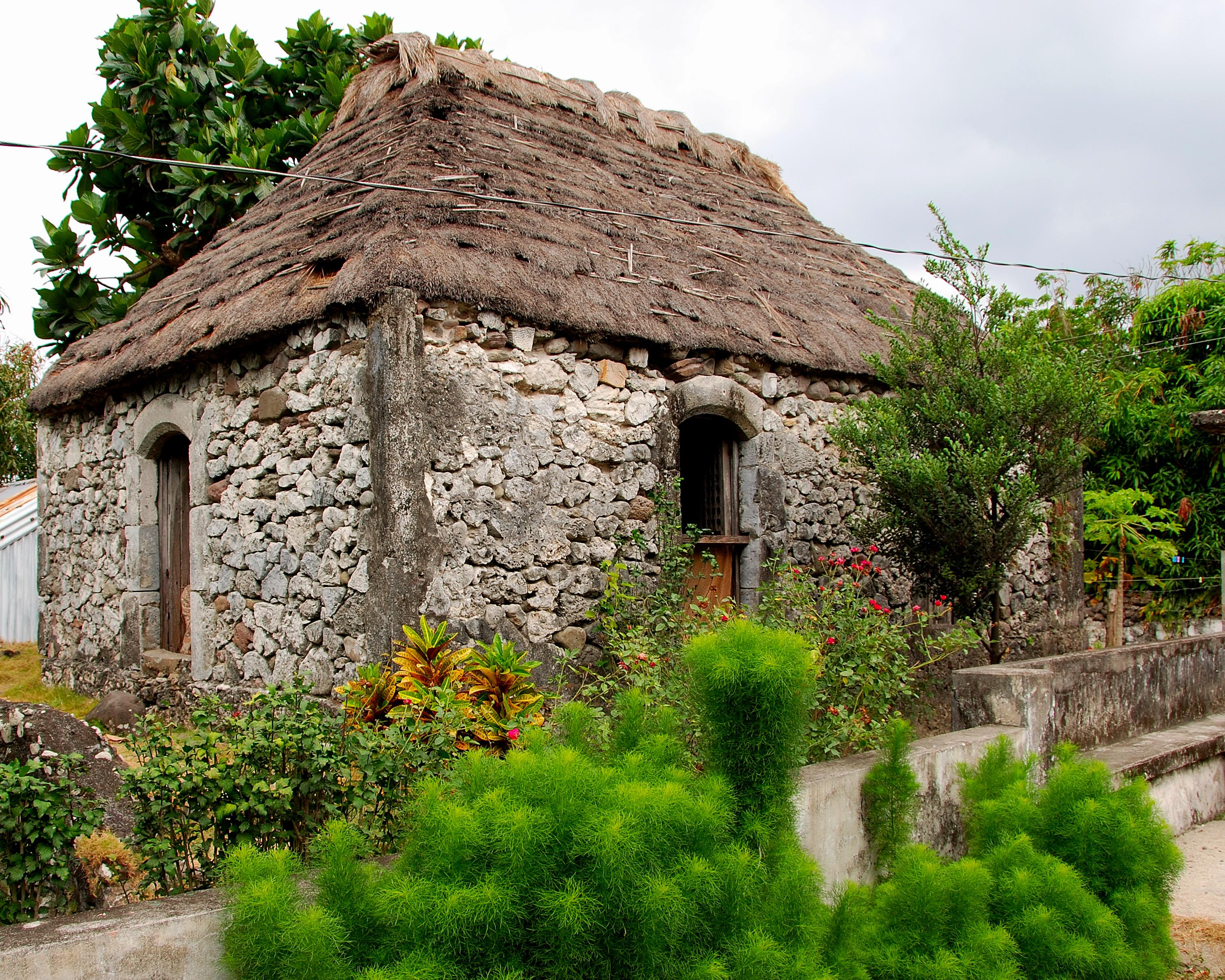
Vahay ni Dakay Ivatan house, one of the oldest structures in the Batanes islands. The house is made of limestone and coral and its roofing of cogon grass.

In 1993, the Batanes Protected Landscape and Seascape, which encompassed the entire province, was listed in the Tentative List of the Philippines for UNESCO World Heritage Site inscription in the future.

In 1997, the Indigenous Peoples Rights Act (IPRA) was passed in Congress. The law paved the way for the indigenous territorial rights of the Ivatans. The province has since promoted its Ivatan roots. Part of the Ilocano population has returned to mainland Luzon. On December 7, 2004, Pacita Abad died after finishing her last international artwork while suffering from cancer.

=== 21st-century geopolitics ===
A minor dispute between the Philippines and Taiwan erupted in 2007, after Taiwan Times published an editorial written by Tamkang University professor Chen Hurng-yu, claiming that Taiwan has territorial claims over Batanes and encouraging the Taiwanese government to take over the province. He asserted the province laid outside the 20° latitude line, which he claimed was not covered by both the 1898 and the 1900 treaties. This, despite the islands being first claimed by Spanish Philippines in 1783 and later incorporated and administered by the Philippines without any contesting nation since the 18th century.

In 2025, the Mahatao Forward Operating Base, a military facility operated by the Armed Forces of the Philippines, was established in Mahatao.

In June 2026, the Tao people of Taiwan's Orchid Island formally made their first ocean voyage in more than 300 years from their island to meet the Ivatan people of Batanes through traditional boat travel. The move was welcomed by the Ivatans of Batanes, and a similar voyage was also planned towards Orchid Island.

==== Chinese territorial claim on Batanes ====
On June 30, 2026, Jinan University in Guangzhou hosted an event for researchers from various Chinese universities who claimed that the Philippines does not have historical and legal sovereignty rights to Batanes. They asserted that the islands are "a natural geographical extension" of their claimed province of Taiwan and therefore subject to the jurisdiction of the People's Republic of China. Philippine officials condemned these statements, and the National Historical Commission of the Philippines released a rebuttal based on Batanes geography and historical events. Jinan University eventually withdrew the study session on July 15.

A September 3 opinion article on the Chinese government-run tabloid Global Times reiterated the Chinese scholarly claims. Wang Yuanyuan, the article author whom the Philippine Star described as "an assistant research fellow at the Center for South China Sea History and Culture of China's National Institute for South China Sea Studies", argued that Batanes was historically linked to Taiwan.

On September 28, the Chinese research vessel Jia Hai Ke 7 loitered at 38 nautical miles northwest of Itbayat, within the exclusive economic zone of the Philippines. The Philippine Coast Guard (PCG) suspected the vessel was investigating the submarine cables in the area. PCG Rear Admiral Jay Tarriela criticized the vessel's attempt to evade the Philippine authorities by AIS spoofing, having identified itself as located in Papua New Guinea. The submarine cables to the west of Itbayat are crucial in connecting the Philippine communications infrastructure to mainland Asia. A subsequent Chinese embassy statement asserted the Chinese sovereignty on the western waters of Itbayat, arguing that the overlapping claims of both Beijing and Manila "should be properly resolved through negotiations" and cited a "consensus reached between China and the Philippines". Tarriela viewed this response as a "confirmation and claim that they have legal jurisdiction in the seas of Batanes". The PCG deployed BRP Teresa Magbanua, which successfully drove the Chinese vessel away on October 1.

== Geography ==
The province has a total area of 219.01 square kilometers (84.56 sq mi) comprising ten islands situated within the Luzon Strait between the Balintang Channel and Taiwan. The islands are sparsely populated and subject to frequent typhoons. The three largest islands, Batan, Itbayat, and Sabtang, are the only inhabited islands.

The northernmost island in the province, also the northernmost land in the entire Philippines, is Mavulis (or Y'ami) Island. Other islands in the chain are Misanga (or Maysanga, also known as North Island), Ditarem (also known as Mavudis or Mabudis), A'li Islet, Siayan, Diogo (or Dinem), Ivuhos, and Dequey. The islands are part of the Luzon Volcanic Arc.

=== Topography ===
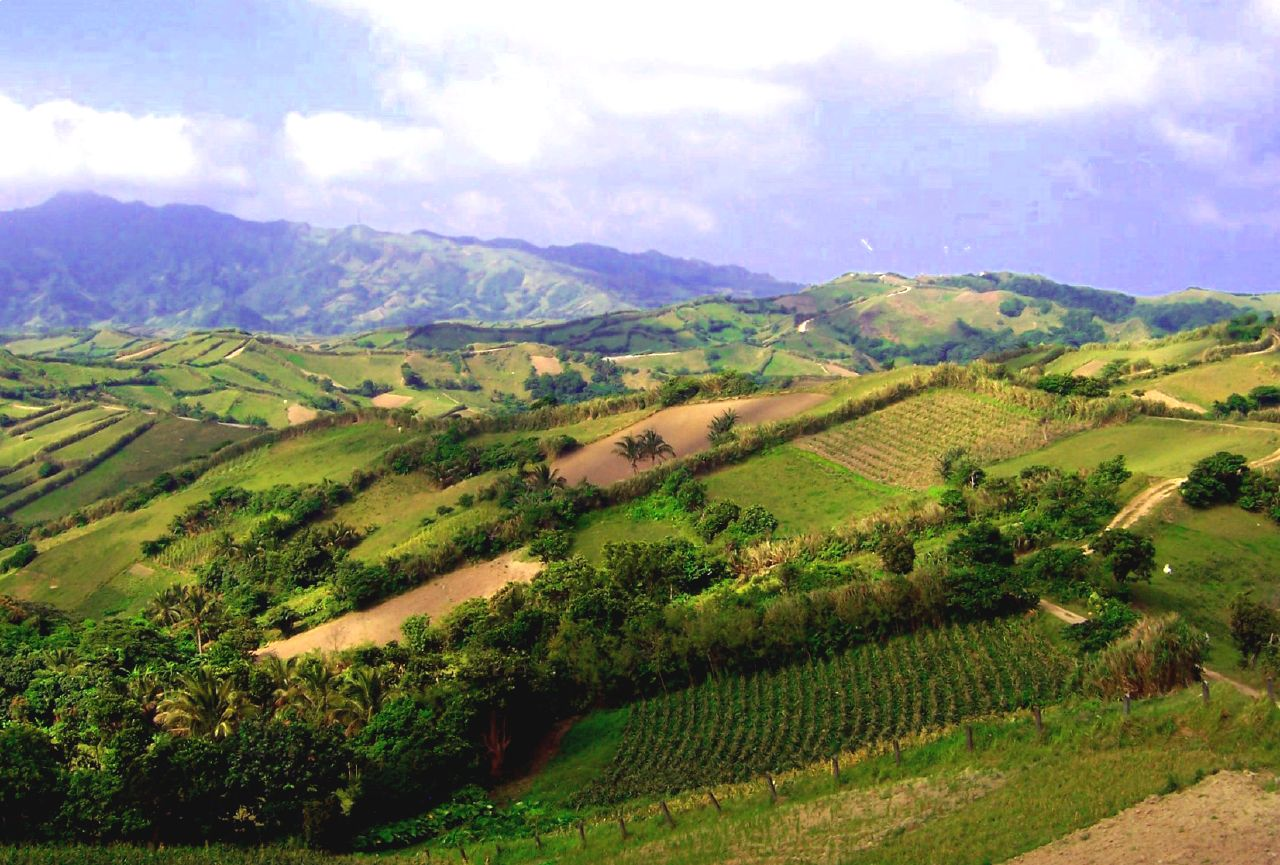
Batanes Hills

Almost one-half of Batanes is hills and mountains. Batan Island is generally mountainous on the north and southeast. It has a basin in the interior. Itbayat Island slopes gradually to the west, being mountainous and hilly along its northern, eastern coast. On Sabtang, mountains cover the central part, making the island slope outward to the coast.

The islands are situated between the vast expanse of the waters of Bashi Channel and Balintang Channel, where the Pacific Ocean merges with the South China Sea. The area is a sea lane between the Philippines and Japan, China, Hong Kong and Taiwan. It is rich with marine resources, including the rarest sea corals in the world.

The province is hilly and mountainous, with only 1,631.5 hectares (4,032 acres) or 7.1% of its area level to undulating terrain. 78.2% or 17,994.4 hectares vary from rolling hills to steep and very steep. Forty-two percent (42%) or 9,734.40 hectares (24,054.2 acres) are steep to very steep land. Because of the terrain of the province, drainage is good and prolonged flooding is non-existent.

The main island of Batan has the largest share of level and nearly level lands, followed by Itbayat and Sabtang, respectively. Itbayat has gently rolling hills and nearly level areas on semi-plateaus surrounded by continuous massive cliffs rising from 20 to 70 meters (66 to 230 feet) above sea level, with no shorelines. Sabtang has its small flat areas spread sporadically on its coasts, while its interior is dominated by steep mountains and deep canyons. Batan Island and Sabtang have intermittent stretches of sandy beaches and rocky shorelines.

The terrain, while picturesque at almost every turn, has limited the potential for expansion of agriculture in an already very small province.

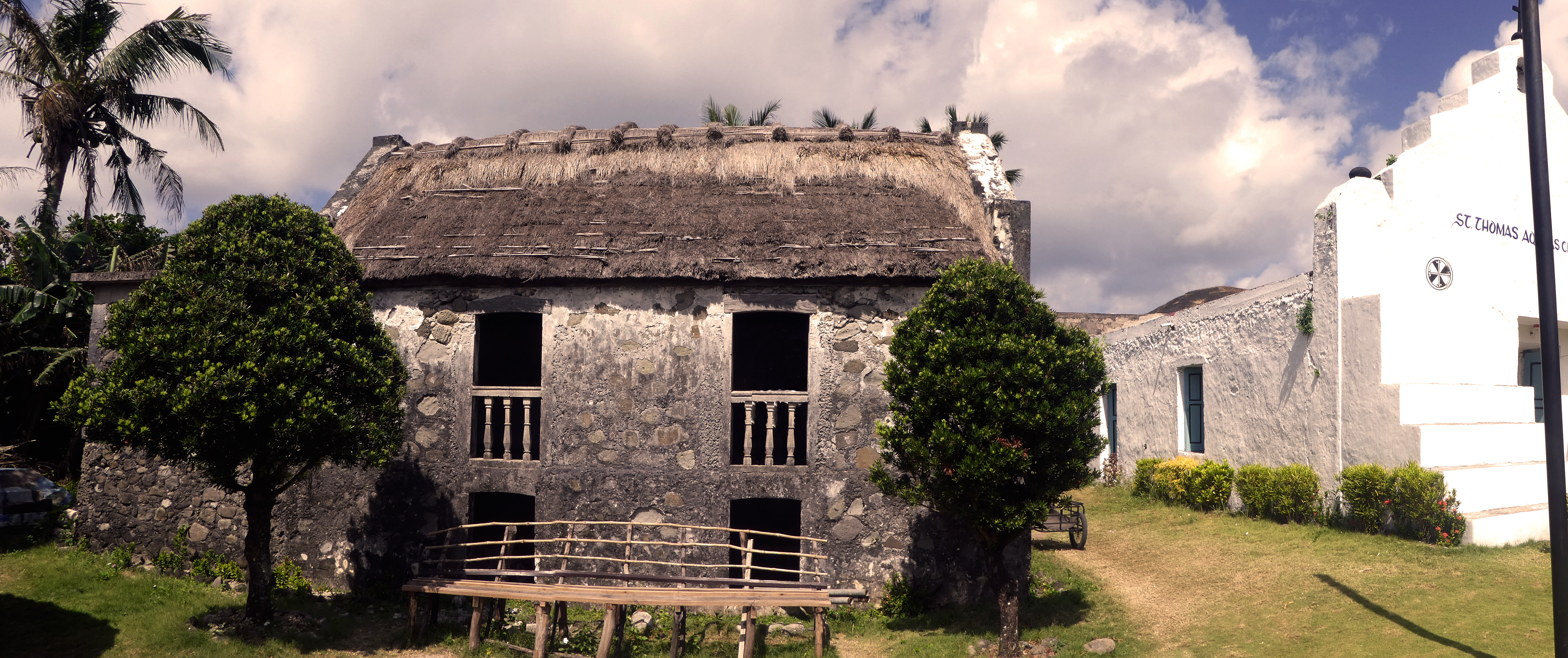
A Batanes stone house

=== Climate ===
Batanes has a tropical climate (Köppen climate classification Am). The average yearly temperature is 26.0 °C (78.8 °F). The average monthly temperature ranges from 22.0 °C (71.6 °F) in January to 28.5 °C (83.3 °F) in July, similar to that of Southern Taiwan. Precipitation is abundant throughout the year. The rainiest month is August. The driest month is April. November to February are the coldest months.

There is a misconception that Batanes is constantly battered by typhoons. Batanes is mentioned frequently in connection with typhoons, because it holds the northernmost weather station in the Philippines, thus, it is a reference point for all typhoons that enter the Philippine area. In September 2016, Typhoon Meranti impacted the entire province, including a landfall on Itbayat.

=== Administrative divisions ===
Batanes is subdivided into 6 municipalities, all encompassed by a lone congressional district.

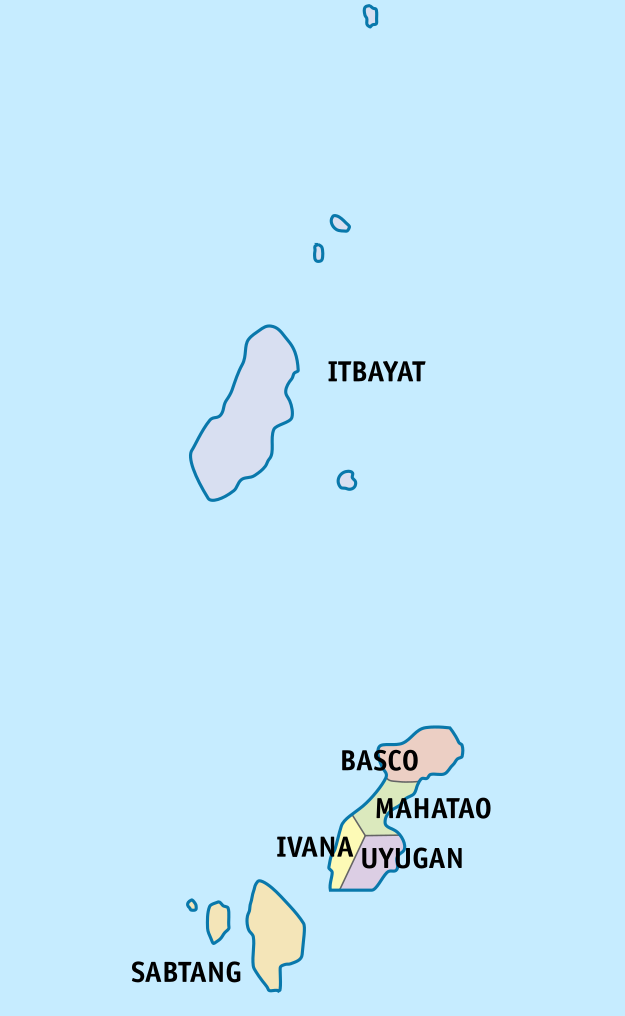
Political divisions

Municipality (Note: The globe icon marks the town center.)		Population			±% p.a.	Area		Density		Barangay
		(2024)		(2020)		km^{2}	sq mi	/km^{2}	/sq mi	
Basco	†	50.9%	9,647	9,517	+0.32%	33.67	13.00	290	750	6
Itbayat		15.5%	2,937	3,128	−1.47%	83.13	32.10	35	91	5
Ivana		7.2%	1,368	1,407	−0.66%	16.54	6.39	83	210	4
Mahatao		9.2%	1,745	1,703	+0.57%	12.90	4.98	140	360	4
Sabtang		9.4%	1,774	1,696	+1.06%	40.70	15.71	44	110	6
Uyugan		7.7%	1,466	1,380	+1.16%	16.28	6.29	90	230	4
Total			18,937	18,831	+0.13%	203.22	78.46	93	240	29
	† Provincial capital					Municipality				

=== Barangays ===
The six municipalities of the province comprise a total of 29 barangays. Ihuvok II in Basco was the most populous in 2024, and Nakanmuan in Sabtang was the least.

== Demographics ==
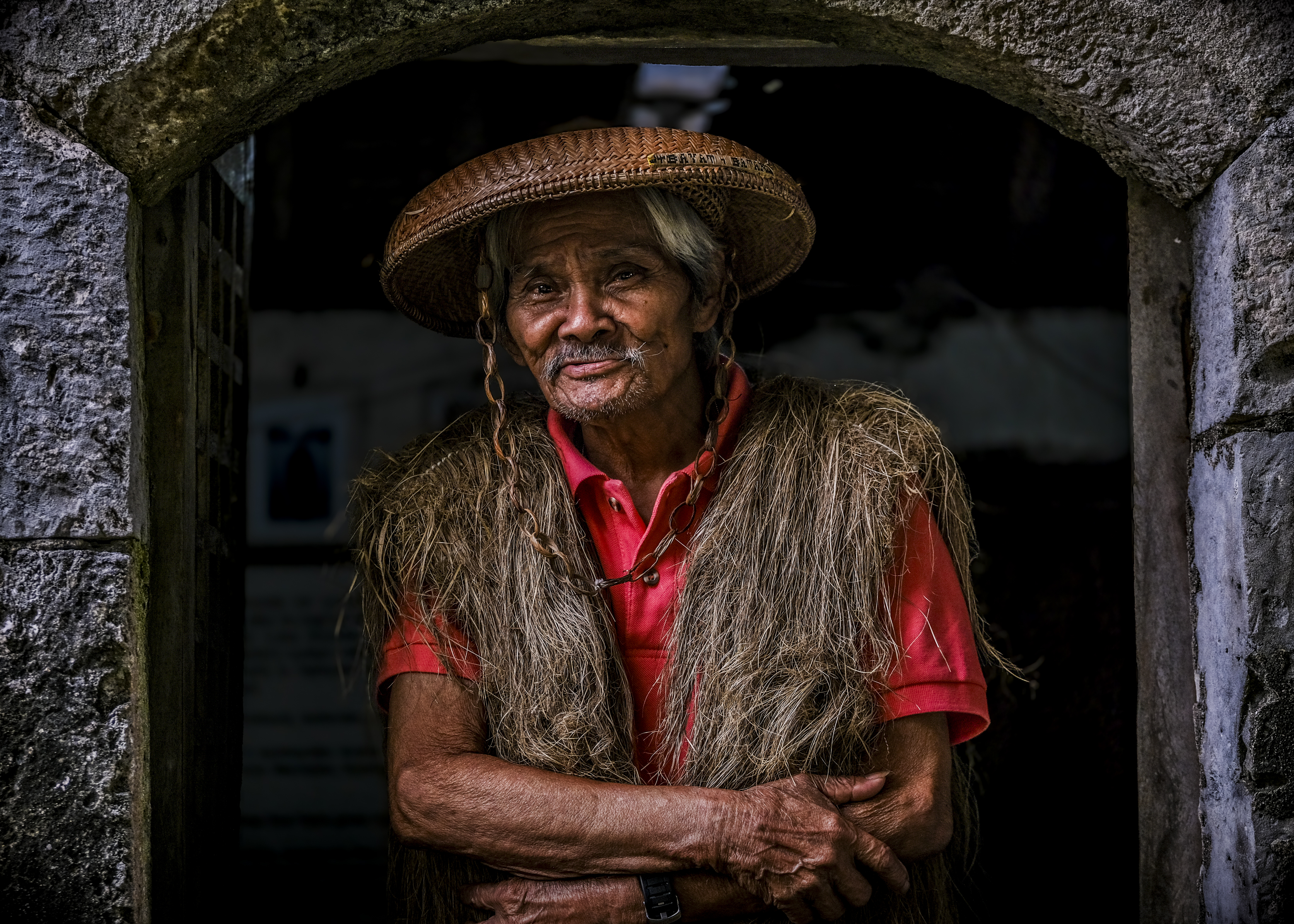
An Ivatan man with a traditional talugong headgear and a kanay-i vest

Population census of Batanes

Year	Pop.	±% p.a.
1903	8,293	—
1918	8,214	−0.06%
1939	9,512	+0.70%
1948	10,705	+1.32%
1960	10,309	−0.31%
1970	11,398	+1.01%

Year	Pop.	±% p.a.
1975	11,870	+0.82%
1980	12,091	+0.37%
1990	15,026	+2.20%
1995	14,180	−1.08%
2000	16,467	+3.26%
2007	15,974	−0.42%

Year	Pop.	±% p.a.
2010	16,604	+1.42%
2015	17,246	+0.73%
2020	18,831	+1.87%
2024	18,937	+0.13%

Source: Philippine Statistics Authority

The population of Batanes in the 2024 census was 18,937 people. The population density was 86 inhabitants per square kilometer or 220 inhabitants per square mile.

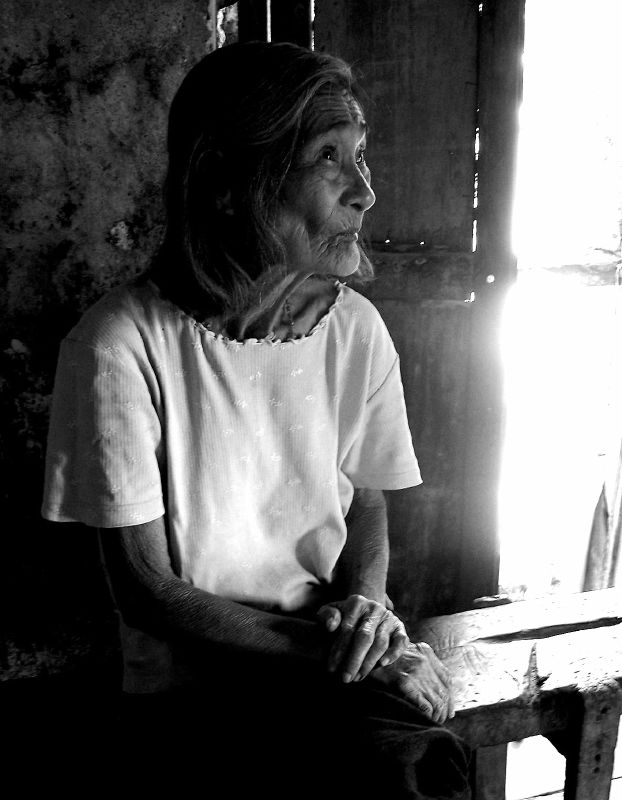
An elderly Ivatan woman inside her house

The natives are called Ivatans. They share prehistoric cultural and linguistic commonalities with the Babuyan on Babuyan Island and the Tao people of Orchid Island.

This divided homeland is a result of the Dutch invasion of Taiwan in 1624 (Dutch Formosa) and Spanish invasion in 1626 (Spanish Formosa). The northern half of the Ivatan homeland, Formosa and Orchid Island were part of the Viceroyalty of New Spain. This area came under Dutch governance. The Dutch were expelled in 1662 by forces of the Chinese Southern Ming dynasty, led by the Chinese pirate Koxinga who then set himself up as the King of Taiwan.

The southern half of the Ivatan homeland, the islands of Batanes, was reinforced and fortified by Spanish refugees from Formosa, before being formally joined in the 18th century with the Spanish government in Manila.

An Ilocano minority population lives in Batanes. Some have left and returned to mainland Luzon.

=== Languages ===
The main languages spoken in Batanes are Ivatan, which is spoken on the islands of Batan and Sabtang. Itbayaten is spoken primarily on the island of Itbayat. The Ivatan which is dominant in the province is considered to be one of the Austronesian languages. From college level down to elementary level, the language is widely spoken. Ilocano, the lingua franca of northern Luzon, is however not widely spoken or understood by the Ivatans. The Ivatans also speak and understand Tagalog and English.

Ivatan-speaking communities can be found in other parts of the country, mainly in mainland Luzon, as well as overseas.

== Ecology ==
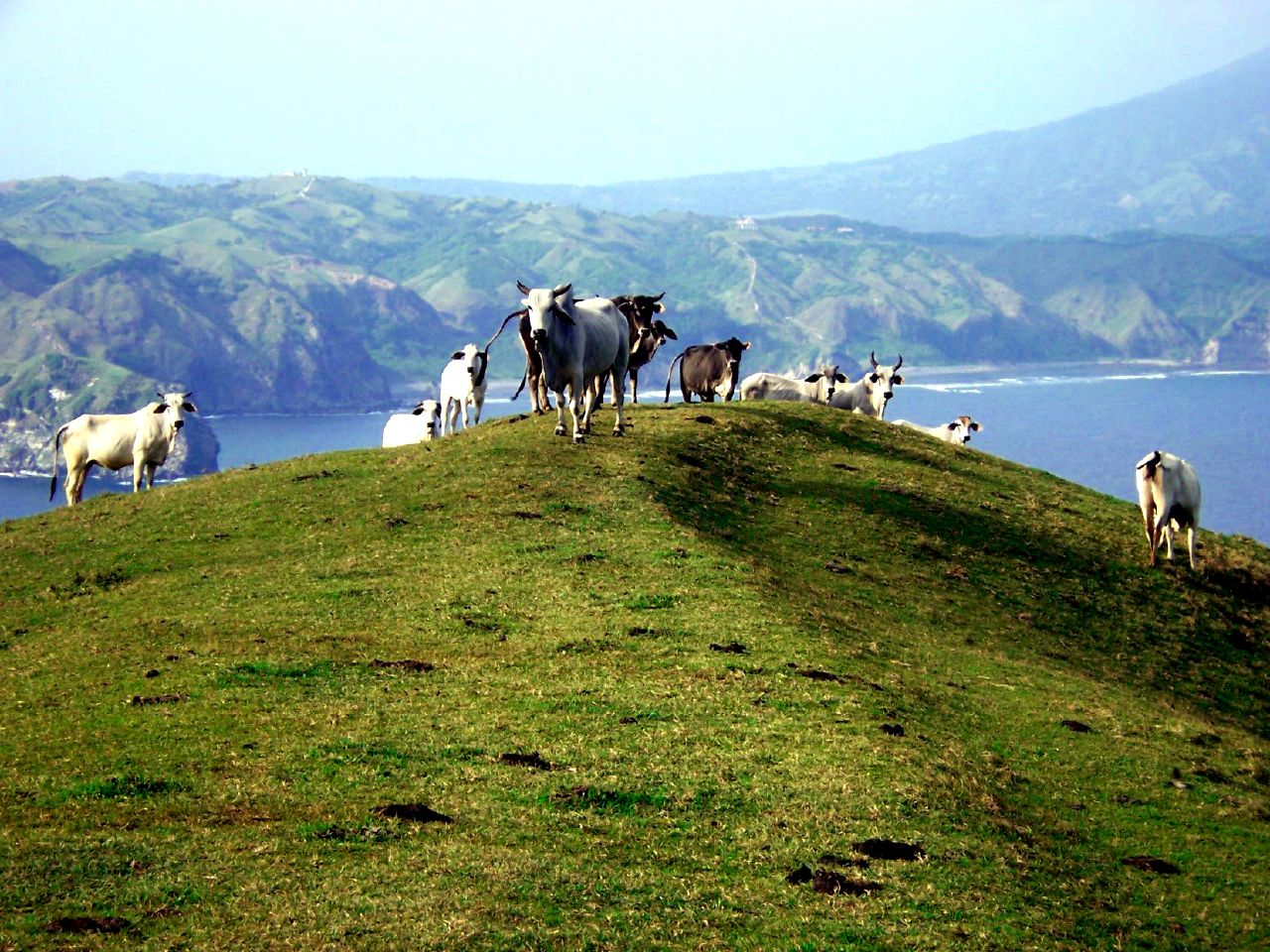
Livestock freely roaming in the green hills in Batanes

An extensive survey of the ecology of Batanes provided the scientific basis for confirming the need for a national park in Batanes protecting the Batanes protected landscapes and seascapes, proposed as a UNESCO World Heritage Site, submitted in August 1993. An effort is underway to declare the whole province, along with the sugar central sites in Negros, as a UNESCO World Heritage Site.

=== Flora and fauna ===
The province is the home of the unique conifer species Podocarpus costalis. Although it is reportedly growing in some other places such as coasts of Luzon, Catanduanes and even Taiwan, full blossoming and fruiting are observed only in Batanes. Its fruiting capacity on the island remains a mystery but is likely due to several factors such as climate, soil and type of substratum of the island.

Several species of birds, bats, reptiles and amphibians inhabit the island. Many of those are endemic to the Philippines. The island is a sanctuary for different migratory birds during winter in the Northern Hemisphere. The Batanes archipelago, along with the nearby Babuyan Islands, have been designated an Important Bird Area (IBA) by BirdLife International because they support significant populations of resident Taiwan green pigeons, Ryukyu scops-owls and short-crested monarchs, Chinese egrets on passage, and wintering yellow buntings.

== Economy ==
Poverty incidence of Batanes (%)

Source: Philippine Statistics Authority

About 75% of the Ivatans are farmers and fishermen. The rest are employed in the government and services sector. Garlic and cattle are major cash crops. Ivatans plant camote (sweet potato), cassava, gabi or tuber and a unique variety of white uvi. Sugarcane is raised to produce palek, a kind of native wine, and vinegar.

In recent years, fish catch has declined due to the absence of technical know-how. Employment opportunities are scarce. Most of the educated Ivatans have migrated to urban centers or have gone abroad.

A wind diesel generating plant was commissioned in 2004.

Distance and bad weather work against its economic growth. Certain commodities like rice, soft drinks, and gasoline carry a 75% to 100% mark-up over Manila retail prices.

== Transportation ==
The island province of Batanes is accessible by air, via Basco Airport and Itbayat Airport. There are daily flights from Manila by Philippine Airlines bound to Basco Airport at Batan Island. Philippines Airlines also offers daily flights from Clark Airport. There are also flights from Tuguegarao City (Cagayan) by Sky Pasada as of 2024. These two airlines make Batan Island accessible from the mainland via air travel. The other local airlines previously serving Basco Airport have stopped their transport services after the COVID-19 Pandemic. As of 2024, PAL Express has flown to Batanes since May 2013. Meanwhile, Itbayat, an island Municipality of the province of Batanes, is accessible via Basco Airport. There are no direct flights from the mainland to Itbayat. Itbayat may also be accessed via ferry boats from Basco. Meanwhile, Sabtang, also an island municipality like Itbayat, is accessible via ferry boats from Batan Island, particularly from Ivana Port, a Municipality in the main Island of Batan.

== Values ==
The Ivatan people of Batanes are one of the most egalitarian societies in the Philippines. The prime motivator of the cultural values of the Ivatans are imbibed in their pre-colonial belief systems of respecting nature and all people. The Ivatans, both the older and younger generations, have one of the highest incidences of social acceptance to minority groups in the country.

The Ivatans have a high respect for the elderly and the prowess of natural phenomena such as waves, sea breeze, lightning, thunders, earthquakes, and wildlife congregations. Discriminating against someone based on skin color, ethnic origin, sexual orientation, gender identity, age, and traditions on nature is unacceptable in Ivatan values. Land grabbing is a grave crime in Ivatan societies, making ancestral domain certification an important part of Ivatan jurisprudence since the enactment of the IPRA Law.

== Tourism and culture ==
The entire province is listed in the UNESCO tentative list for inscription in the World Heritage List. The government has been finalizing the site's inscription, establishing museums and conservation programs since 2001. Seven intangible heritage elements of the Ivatan have been set by the Philippine government in its initial inventory in 2012. The elements are undergoing a process to be included in the UNESCO Intangible Cultural Heritage Lists.

A branch of the National Museum of the Philippines is located in Uyugan.

=== Natural ===
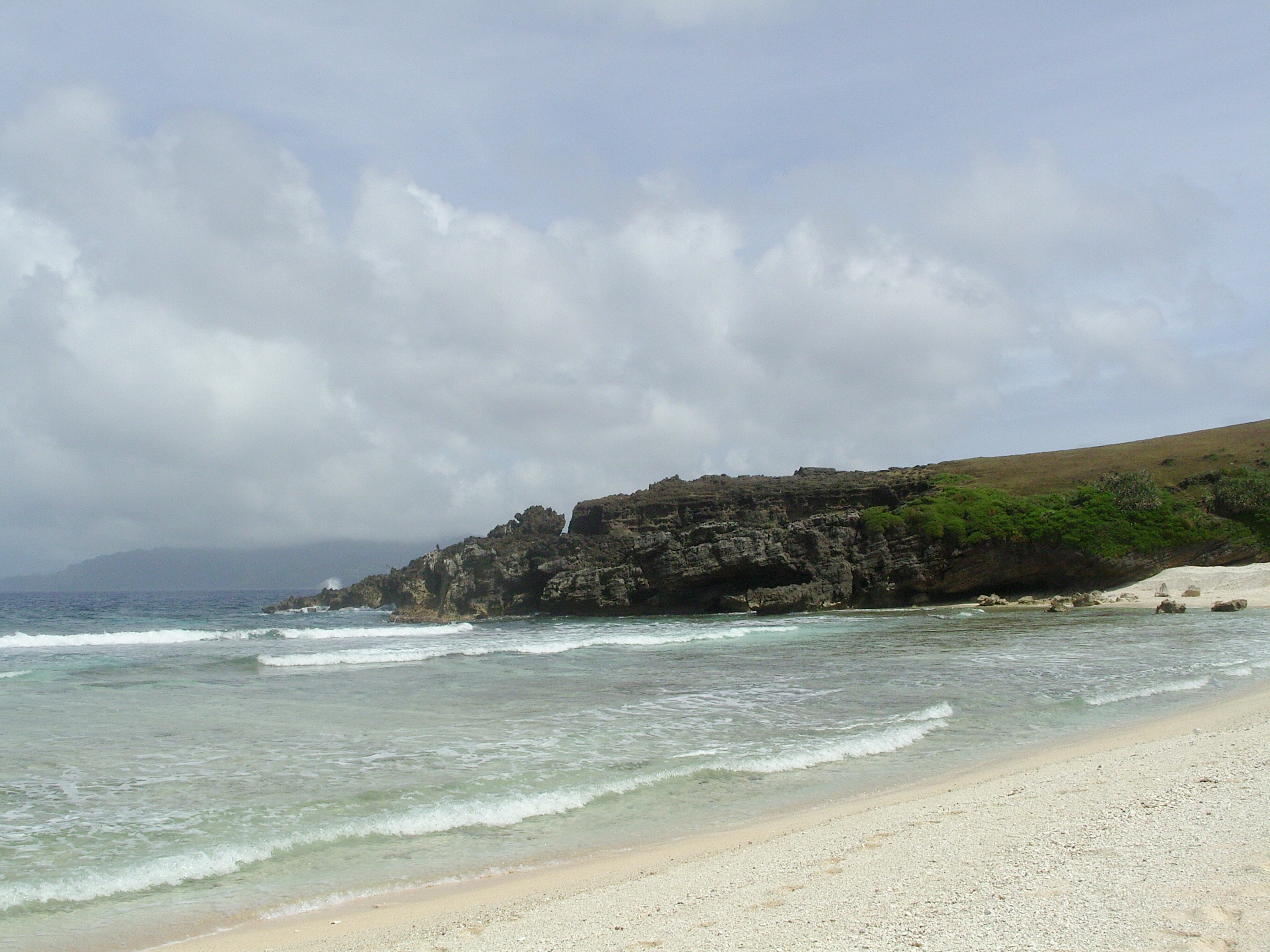
White sand beach at Sabtang island

- Sabtang Island is undisturbed and unspoiled. It has intermittent white sand beaches with steep mountains and deep canyons with small level areas sporadically found along the coastline. Southwest of Batan Island, Sabtang is accessible by 30-minute falowa ride from Radiwan Port in Ivana. Sabtang Island is also the take-off point for Ivuhos Island from Barangay Nakanmuan.
- Itbayat Island is located north of Batan Island. Itbayat is shaped like a giant bowl. The island is surrounded by massive boulders and cliffs rising from 20 to 70 feet (6.1–21.3 metres) above sea level and has no shoreline. It has a dirt airstrip for light aircraft. A regular ferry runs the Batan-Itbayat route. Travel time is about four hours by falowa from Basco Seaport. A light plane flies from Basco Airport to Itbayat at around P1,875 per person and leaves only when the plane is full.
- Batan Island is the most populated island of the province. It is composed of four municipalities: Basco, Ivana, Uyugan, and Mahatao. Basco is the center of commerce and the seat of the provincial government.
- Mount Iraya is a dormant volcano standing at 1,517 meters (4,977 feet) whose last eruption was recorded in 505 AD. Mountaineering, trekking, and trailblazing are recommended sports activities on the mountain. Walking distance from Basco, the top of Mt. Iraya can be reached in about three hours.
- Mavulis Island is the northernmost island of Batanes. From this location, one can see Formosa (Taiwan) on a clear day. Tatus or coconut crabs abound on the island surrounded by rich marine life.
- Di-atay Beach is a cove with multi-colored rocks and white sand ideal for picnics and beachcombing. Located along the highway of Mahatao, it is 9.85 kilometers (6.12 miles) from Basco.
- Songsong in Chadpidan Bay is an hour of trek from Basco proper (3 kilometers (1.9 miles)). It is famous for its sunset view.
- Naidi Hills is walking distance from Basco.
- Chawa Cave is for the more adventurous. An enchanted cave with a natural salt bed whose mouth opens to the south China Sea and is accessible through the boulders of Chawa Point in Mahatao. It is 4 kilometers (2.5 miles) from Basco.
- Sitio Diura at Racuj-a-Ide is the fishermen's village at Mananoy Bay. Fishing season is marked by a festival in mid-March called Kapayvanuvanua. Visitors are treated with fresh fish delicacies from the Pacific Ocean. Within the area is the legendary Spring of Youth and living cave with crystal limestone formations. The bay is nine kilometres (5.6 miles) from Basco.
- Nakabuang Cave is 5.5 kilometers (3.4 miles) from San Vicente Centro in Sabtang.
- Mt. Matarem is an extinct volcano 495 meters (1,624 feet) at its summit. It is eight kilometers (5.0 miles) from Basco.
- White Beach at Vatang, Hapnit, and Mavatuy Point, all in Mahatao.
- Stone houses in Batanes many residents during typhoon made up their already-fortified houses with wood and secured the roofs with nets and ropes. This was done to ensure that the structures—which symbolize the Ivatan's strength and resilience against disasters—outlast the high-pressure winds of a typhoon that is expected to unleash. Tapangkos or covering were also installed on the doors and windows of several buildings in Batanes, including the capitol building. During heavy storms, it was also a time for Bayanihan of the residents as they helped each other tie down roofs.

=== Man-made ===
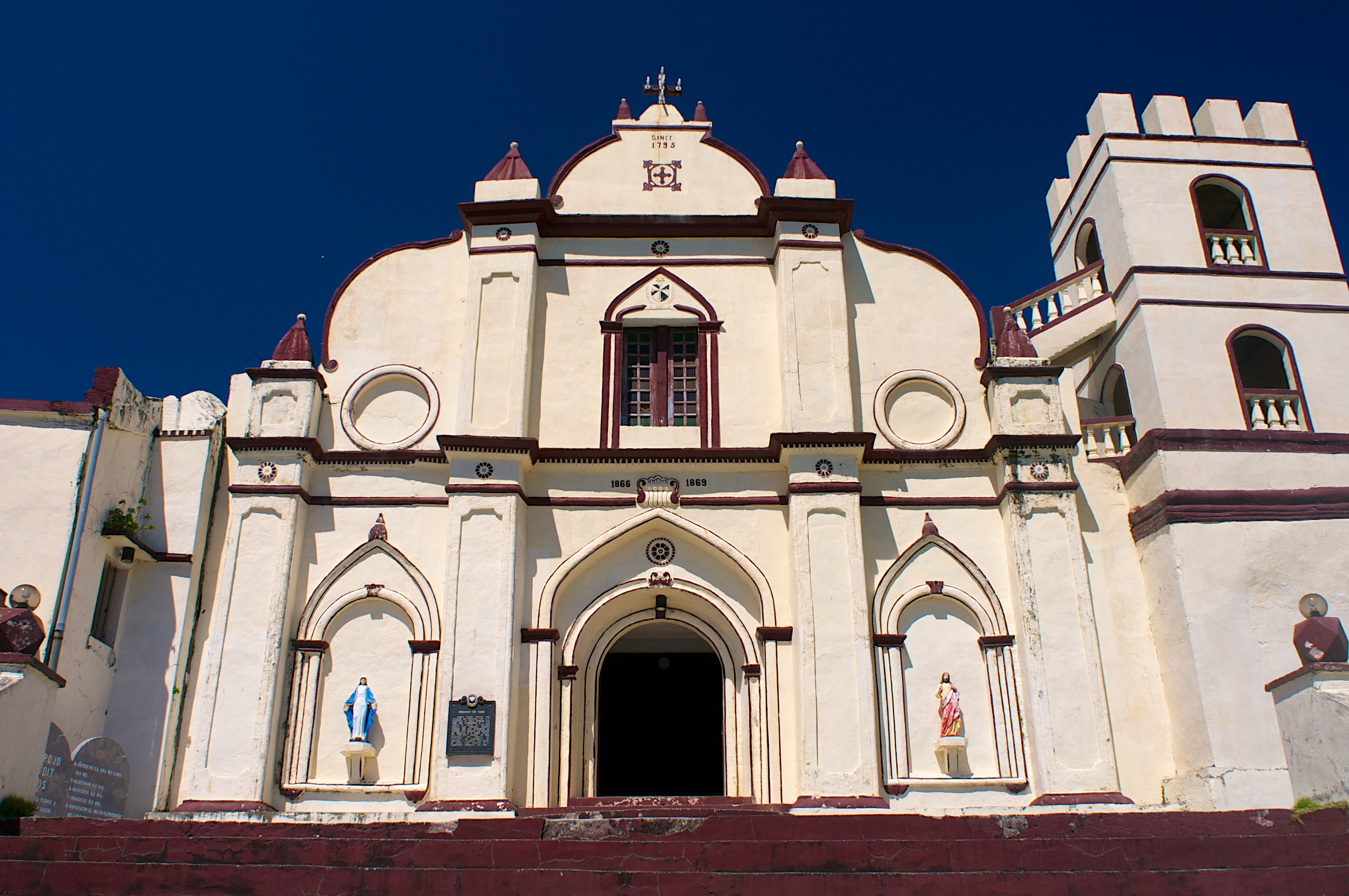
The San Jose de Ivana Church (Ivana Church) in Ivana

- Radar Tukon was a United States weather station on a hilltop. It offers a magnificent 360-degree view of Batan Island, the South China Sea, Mt. Iraya, Basco proper, boulder lined cliffs and the Pacific Ocean. At present, it houses the northernmost weather station in the Philippines, the Basco Radar Station, and is only 2.75 kilometers (1.71 miles) from Basco.
- Old Loran Station housed a US Coast Guard detachment for almost two decades and is about 25 kilometers (16 miles) from Basco.
- Ruins of Songsong is a ghost barangay which is a cluster of roofless shells of old stone houses abandoned after a tidal wave that hit the island of Batan in the 1950s. It has a long stretch of beach. The ruins are 23 kilometers (14 miles) from Basco.
- Basco Cathedral in Basco was established by Dominican missionaries in 1783 and is the seat of the Roman Catholic Territorial Prelature of Batanes.
- San Jose Church in Ivana was built in 1814. It has a crenelated fortress-like campanile. The church fronts the Ivana Seaport and is 14 kilometers (8.7 miles) from Basco.
- San Carlos Borromeo Church and a convent at Mahatao are six kilometers (3.7 miles) from Basco. It was completed in 1789 and still retains its centuries-old features.
- San Vicente Ferrer Church in Sabtang Island is constructed using lime, stone, and coral material and is famous for its rugged stone façade and separate bell tower.
- San Antonino de Florencia Church in Uyugan was built in 1871 under Fr. Fabian Martin, O.P. It is considered the smallest Spanish-era church in Batanes and features a simple espadaña-type façade.
- Tukon Chapel, also known as Mt. Carmel Chapel in Chanarian, Basco is a modern chapel overlooking rolling hills and the sea that was designed with Ivatan-inspired architecture.
- Kanyuyan Beach & Port at Baluarte Bay in Basco is the port of call of the cargo ships bringing goods from Manila
- Idjangs or fortified stone fortresses where the native Ivatans' ancestors migrated to Batanes as early as 4,000 BC lived in them for defensive cover.
- Fundacion Pacita is a lodging house and restaurant, which was formerly owned by Pacita Abad, the most iconic Ivatan visual artist. The house has been redecorated and filled with numerous art works of Pacita Abad after she died in 2004.

=== Historical ===
- Radiwan Point at Ivana Seaport is where the Katipuneros landed on September 18, 1898. It is also the ferry station of the falowas plying the islands of Sabtang and Itbayat.
- Boat-shaped Stone Grave Markers, Chuhangin Burial Site, Ivuhos Island, Sabtang, Batanes
- Chavulan Burial Jar Site, Ivuhos Island, Sabtang Island
- Arrangement of Stone with Holes, Sumnanga, Sabtang
- Columnar Stones, Post Holes, Stone Anchors, Itbud Idyang, Uyugan, Batanes
- Arrangement of Stone Walls, Idyang Site, Basco, Batanes
- Paso Stone Formation, Ivuhos Island, Sabtang, Batanes
- Columnar Stone with Holes, Mahatao, Batanes

=== Intangible heritage ===
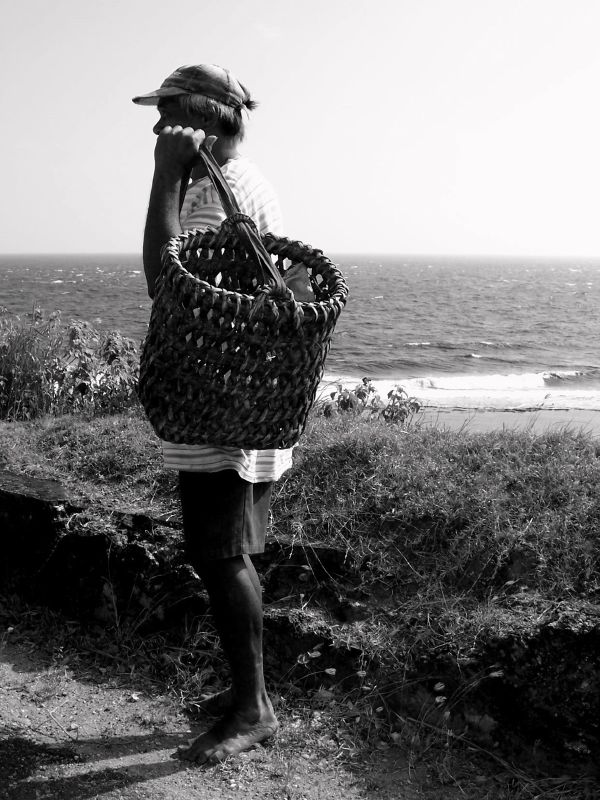
An Ivatan holding one of many types of traditional Ivatan baskets

In 2012, the National Commission for Culture and the Arts (NCCA) and the ICHCAP of UNESCO published Pinagmulan: Enumeration from the Philippine Inventory of Intangible Cultural Heritage, signifying their great importance to Philippine intangible cultural heritage. The first edition of the UNESCO-backed book included:

- Laji
- Kapayvanuvanuwa fishing ritual
- Kapangdeng ritual
- Traditional boats in Batanes
- Sinadumparan Ivatan house types
- Ivatan basketry
- Ivatan (Salakot) hat weaving

The local government of Batanes, in cooperation with the NCCA, is given the right to nominate the seven distinct elements into the UNESCO Intangible Cultural Heritage Lists.

== In popular culture ==
Batanes was featured in the Filipino film Hihintayin Kita sa Langit (1991).

== Government ==
Current Provincial Government Officials (2025-2028)

- Governor: Ronald P. Aguto Jr. (PFP)
- Vice-Governor: Jonathan Enrique V. Nanud Jr. (PFP)

Sangguniang Panlalawigan Members

1st District

- Roel Nicolas (Liberal)
- Anastacia Viola (Liberal)
- Josephine Castillo (PFP)
- Benny Fajardo (Liberal)
- John Dave Ablat (PFP)

2nd District

- Leonardo Hostallero (PFP)
- Cleo Gonzales (Independent)
- Francis Byron Peralta (NPC)

Ex-Officio Members

- Bernardo Mernelo (President, Liga ng mga Barangay)
- Francisco Castillo (President, PCL)
- Vacant (President, Panlalawigang Pederasyon ng Sangguniang Kabataan)
- Vicenta Hidalgo (Representative, IPMR)

=== House of Representatives ===
District	Representative	Party	Term	Bloc
Lone	Vacant (September 21 2026-Present)			TBD
