= Tukon Chapel =

Roman Catholic church in Batanes, Philippines

- Our Lady of Mount Carmel Chapel
- Chapel du Tukon (Ivatan)
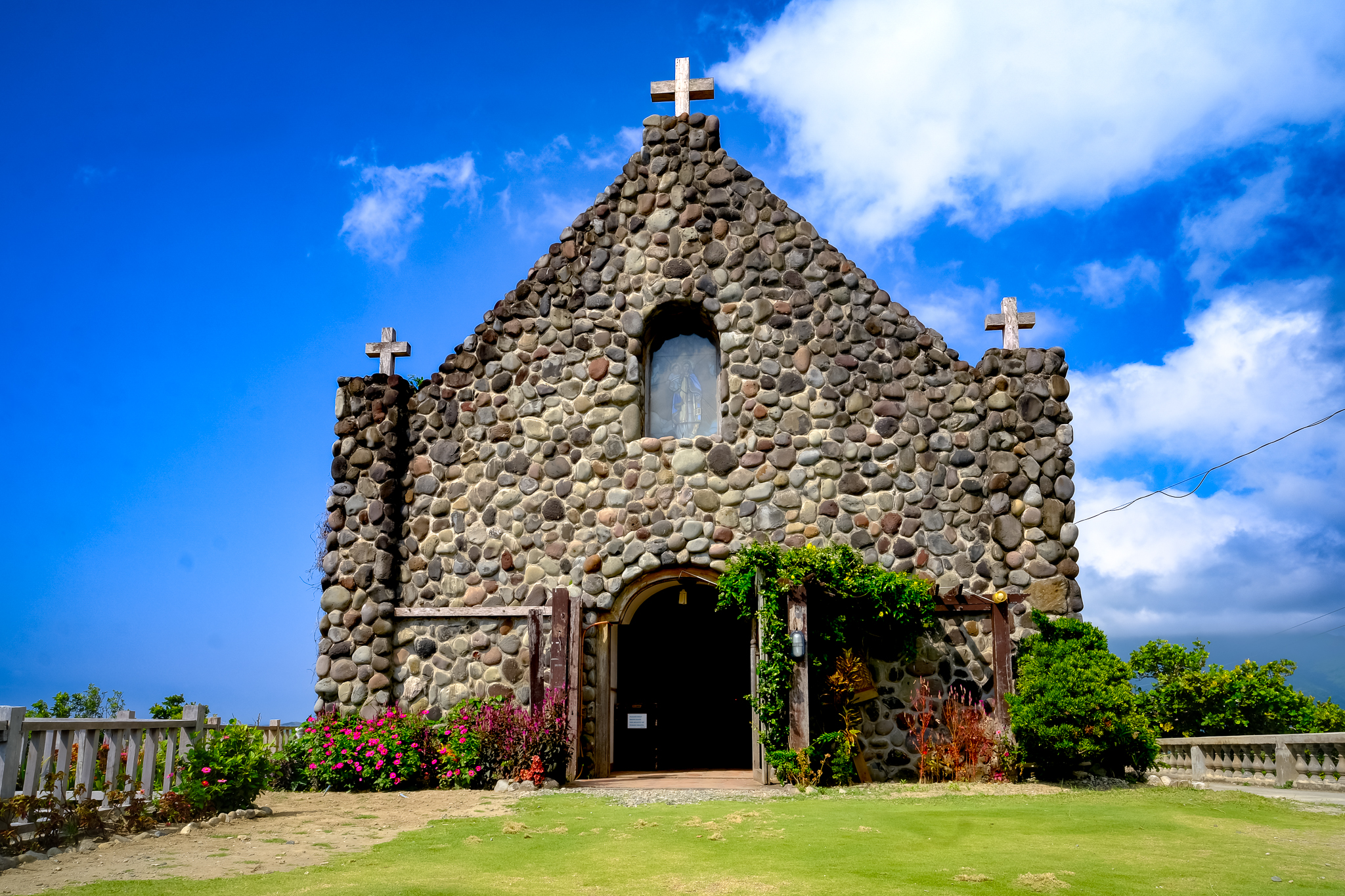
- The chapel's facade.

- Location in Batanes Location in Luzon#Location in the Philippines Tukon Chapel (Philippines)
- 20°25′48″N 121°58′14″E
- Location: Chanarian, Basco, Batanes
- Country: Philippines
- Denomination: Catholic
- Tradition: Roman Rite

History
- Status: Chapel
- Dedication: Our Lady of Mount Carmel
- Dedicated: May 3, 2008

Architecture
- Functional status: Active
- Architect(s): Joven Ignacio and Cristina V. Turalba
- Architectural type: Chapel
- Style: Vernacular Ivatan Architecture
- Groundbreaking: 2007
- Completed: 2008

Administration
- Division: Prelature of Batanes
- Metropolis: Tuguegarao

Our Lady of Mount Carmel Chapel commonly known as the Tukon Chapel is a Roman Catholic chapel located in Chanarian, Basco, Batanes.
