= Uyugan Church =

- San Antonino de Florencia Parish Church
- Parokya ni San Antonino de Florencia (Filipino); Parroquia de San Antonino de Florencia (Spanish)
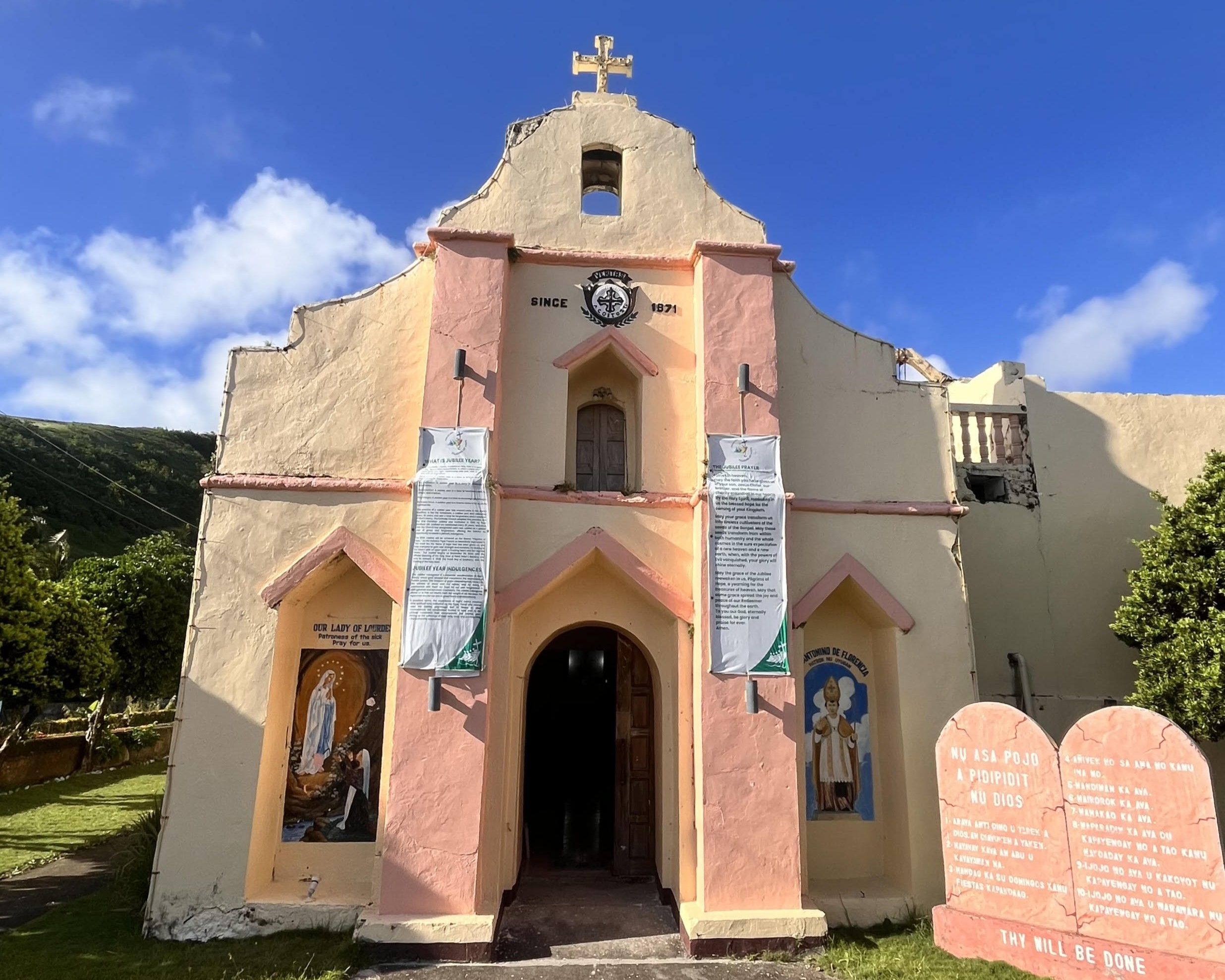
- The church's facade in 2025.

- Location in Batanes Location in Luzon Location in the Philippines
- 20°21′02″N 121°56′18″E
- Location: Uyugan, Batanes
- Country: Philippines
- Language(s): Ivatan, English
- Denomination: Roman Catholic

History
- Status: Parish church
- Dedication: Antoninus of Florence

Architecture
- Functional status: Active
- Architect(s): Fr. Fabian Martin, O.P.
- Architectural type: Church building
- Style: Baroque
- Completed: 1871; 155 years ago

Specifications
- Length: 25.68 m (84.3 ft)
- Width: 8.34 m (27.4 ft)
- Materials: Stone, Lime mortar

Administration
- Province: Tuguegarao
- Metropolis: Tuguegarao
- Diocese: Prelature of Batanes

The San Antonino de Florencia Parish Church, commonly known as the Uyugan Church, is a Roman Catholic parish church located in the municipality of Uyugan in the province of Batanes in the Philippines. It is under the jurisdiction of the Territorial Prelature of Batanes and is dedicated to Saint Antoninus of Florence. The church was established during the Spanish colonial period through the missionary activities of the Dominican Order in Batanes.

== History ==
The Christianization of Batanes began in the late seventeenth century through the missionary efforts of Dominican priests who established missions throughout the islands as part of Spain's colonial expansion in northern Luzon. Uyugan initially functioned as a visita under the ecclesiastical jurisdiction of Ivana, one of the earliest mission centers established in southern Batan Island. Historical studies on Dominican missions in Batanes note that the establishment of churches and mission stations played a significant role in consolidating Spanish colonial presence in the province.

The present church was constructed in 1871 under the supervision of Dominican missionary Fr. Fabian Martin, O.P., who served in Batanes from 1844 until 1878. Fr. Martin was associated with the construction and improvement of several ecclesiastical structures in the province and was considered among the most influential Dominican missionaries assigned to Batanes during the nineteenth century.

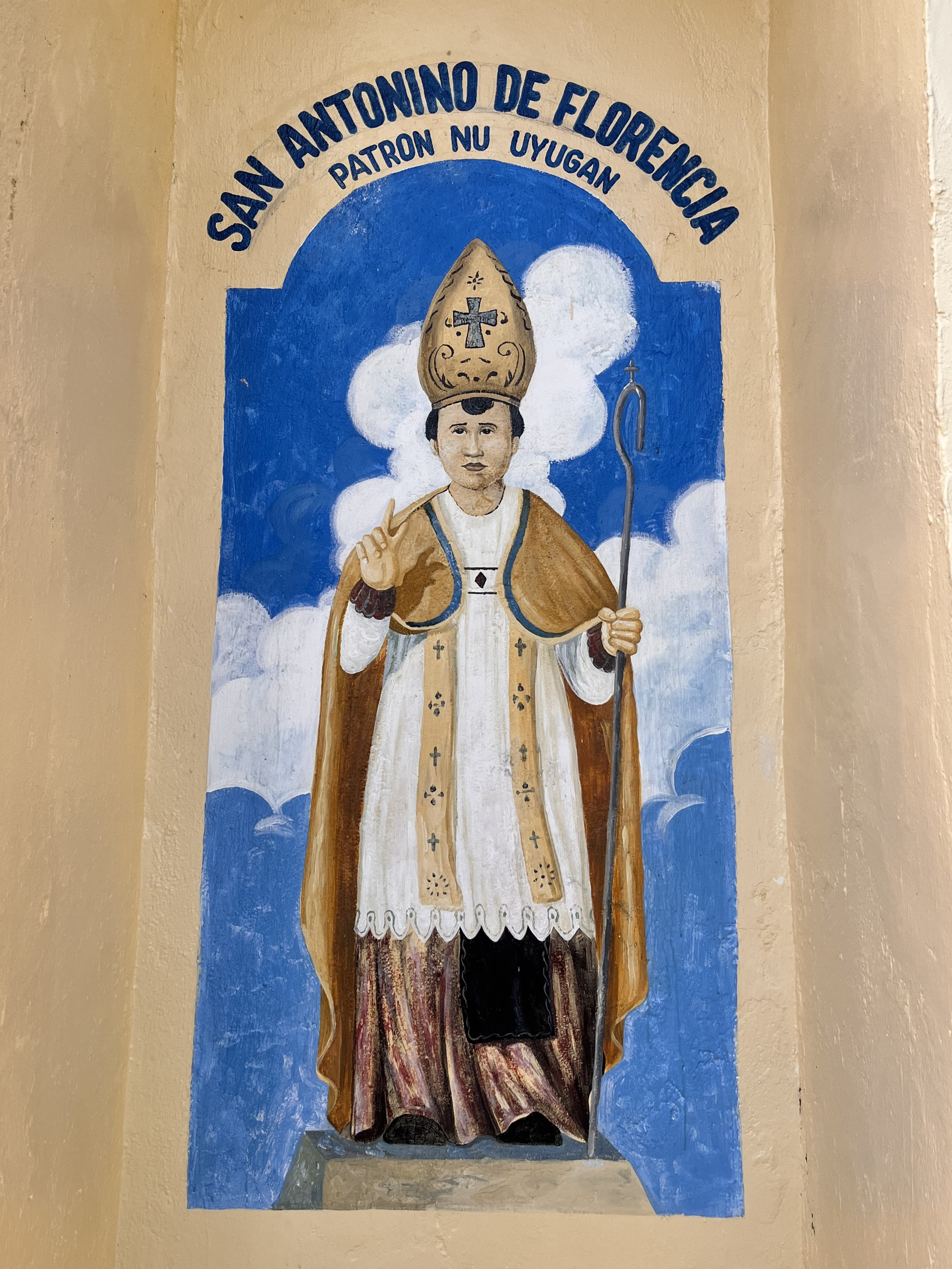
a mural of Saint Antoninus of Florence, patron saint of Uyugan on the church's facade.

The church was dedicated to Saint Antoninus of Florence, a fifteenth-century Dominican friar and Archbishop of Florence known for his theological scholarship and charitable works. The dedication reflects the influence of Dominican spirituality and patronage in the religious life of colonial Batanes.

Due to the province's location along the Luzon Strait, the church has historically been exposed to strong typhoons, earthquakes, and salt-laden sea winds. Consequently, the structure underwent periodic repairs and maintenance throughout its history in order to preserve its functionality as the principal Catholic place of worship in Uyugan.

== Architecture ==
The church reflects the adaptation of Spanish colonial ecclesiastical architecture to the environmental conditions of Batanes, where strong typhoons and frequent seismic activity greatly influenced construction methods. Considered to be the smallest surviving Spanish-era church in Batanes, the structure is characterized by its compact proportions, thick stone masonry walls, and restrained ornamentation, all of which contribute to its structural stability and resistance to harsh weather conditions.

It is primarily constructed of stone and lime mortar, materials commonly used in Ivatan vernacular and religious architecture during the Spanish colonial period. Its façade exhibits simplified Baroque features combined with subtle Gothic Revival influences. The front elevation incorporates an espadaña-type bell gable integrated directly into the façade instead of a separate bell tower, a practical design suited to the windy conditions of the islands. Broad flat pilasters reinforce the façade vertically, while pointed gables above the entrance and niches suggest Gothic-inspired detailing.

Step buttresses along the sides of the church provide additional reinforcement against lateral forces caused by strong winds and earthquakes. The interior follows a simple single-nave plan with minimal decorative elements, consistent with the modest architectural character of small Dominican mission churches established in remote colonial communities. The church also harmonizes visually with the surrounding Ivatan stone houses of Uyugan, reflecting the integration of Spanish ecclesiastical design with indigenous building traditions in Batanes.

== Gallery ==
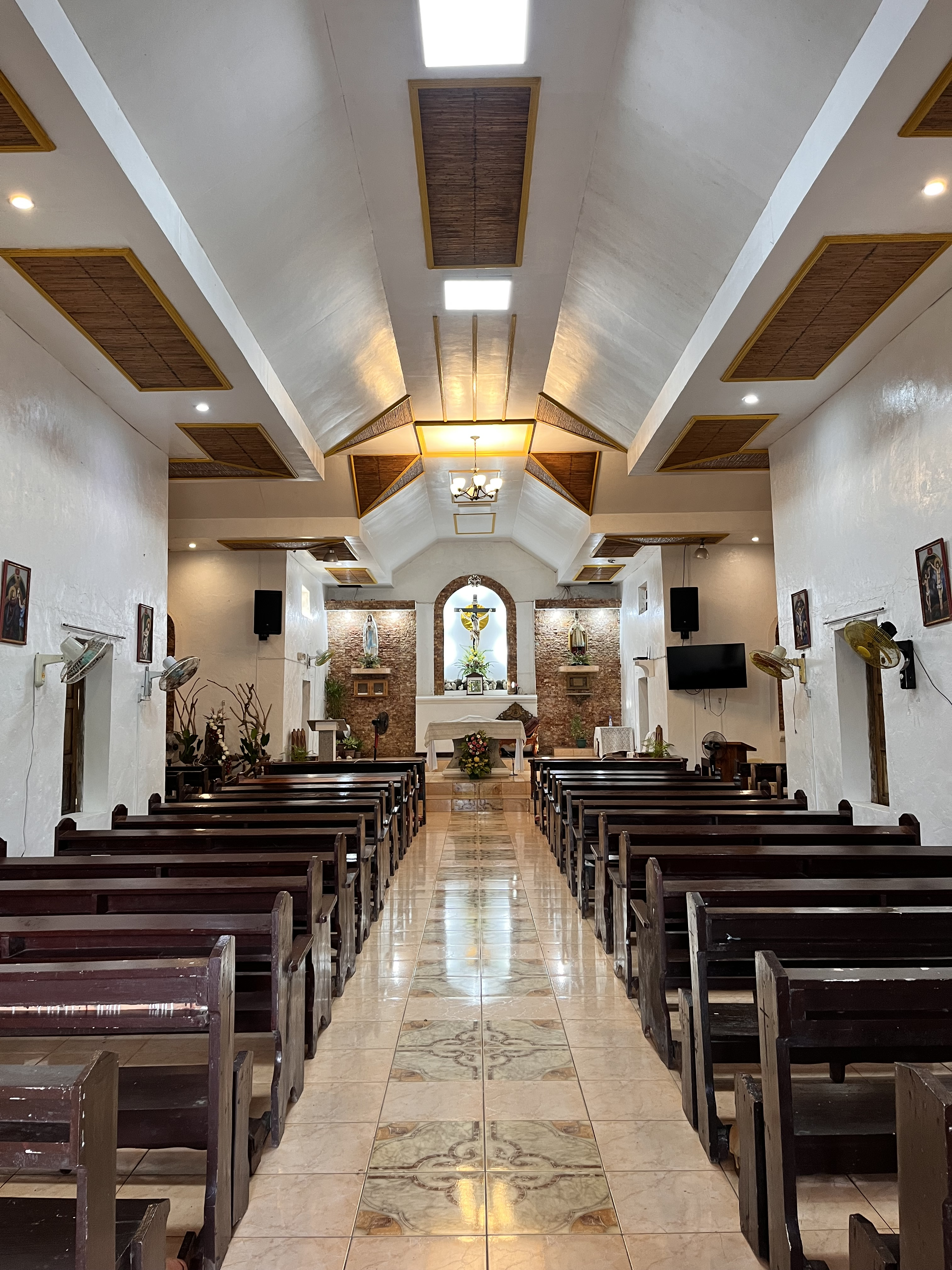
The church's nave.

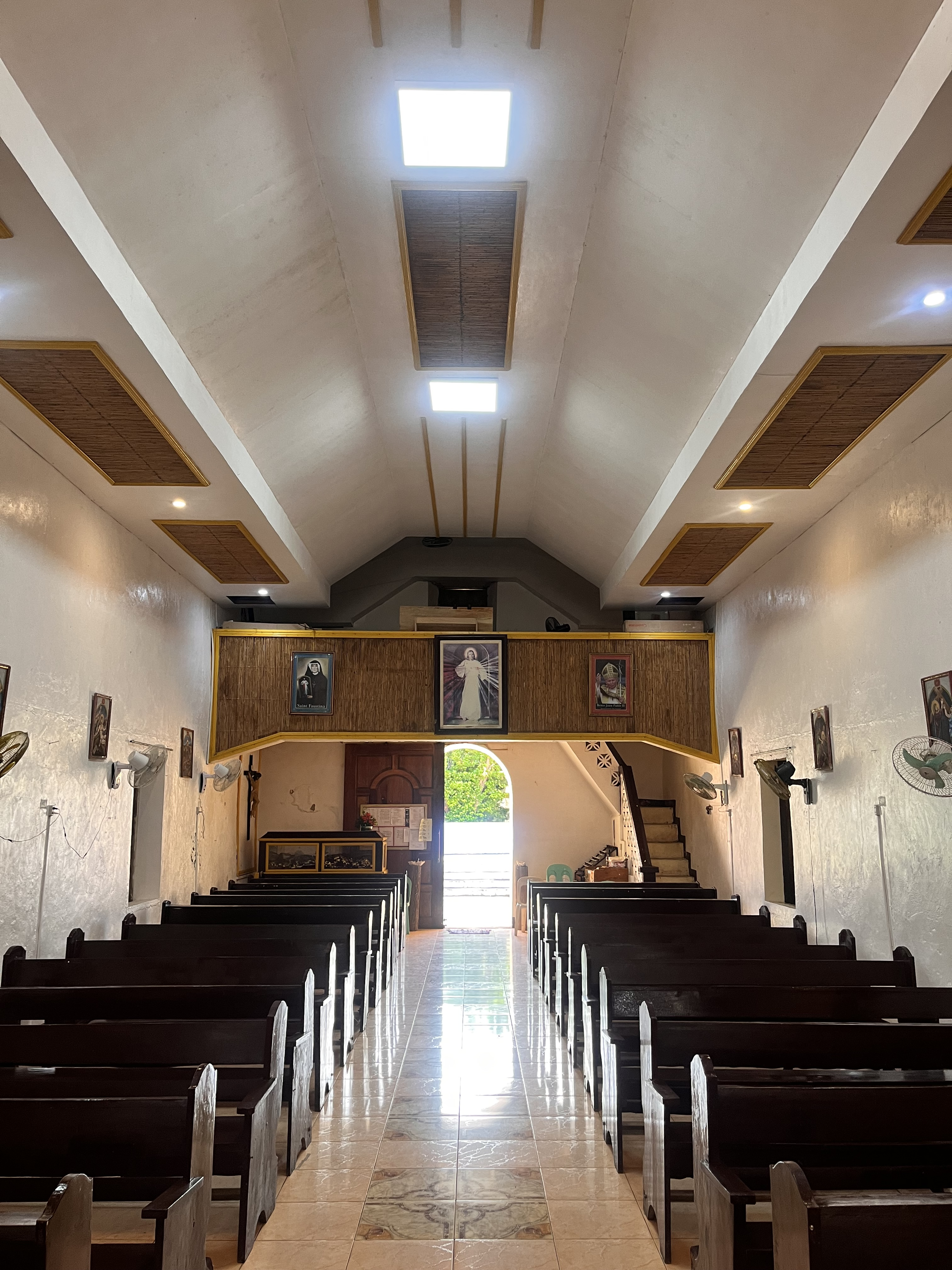
The church's choir loft.

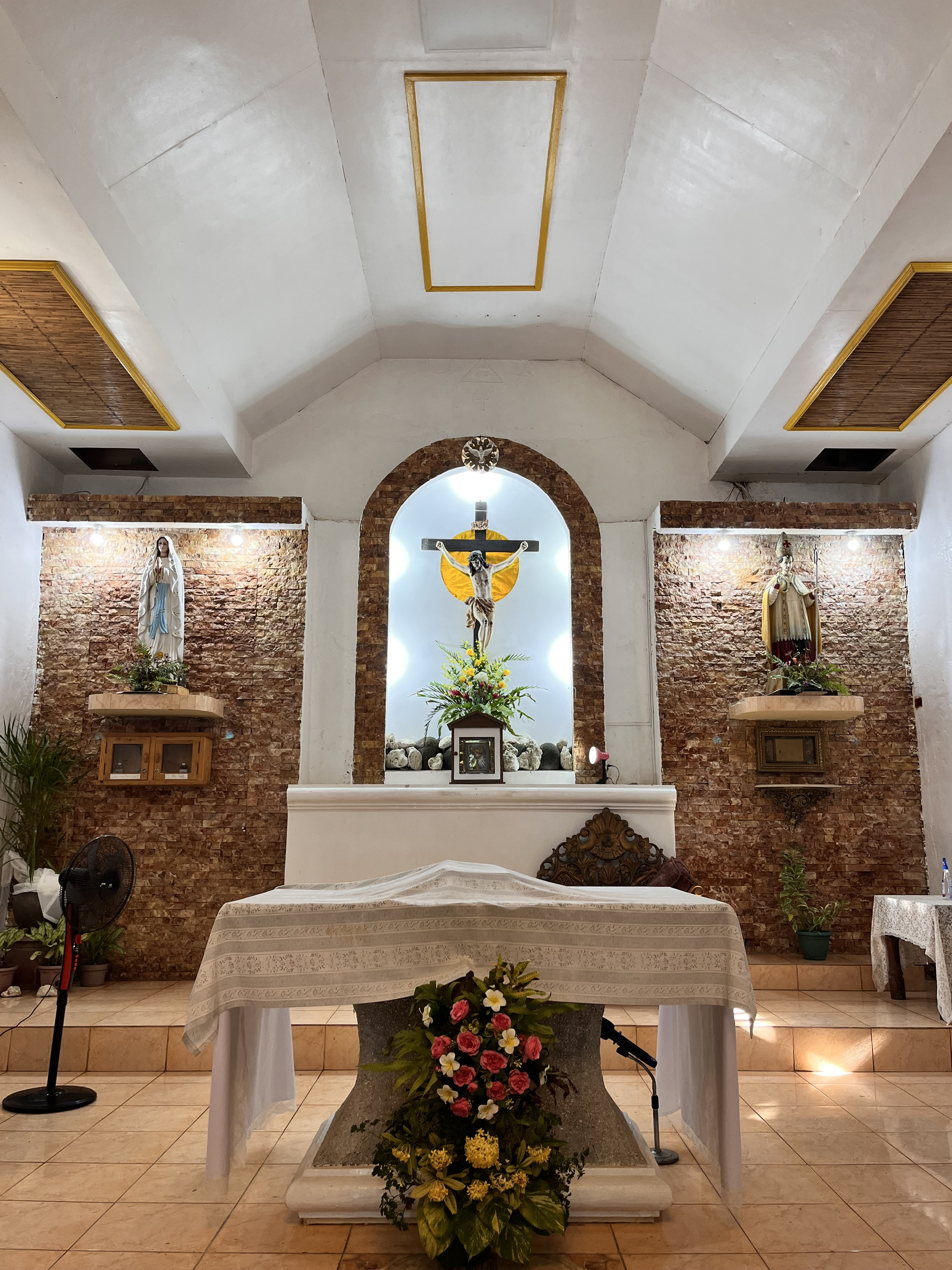
The church's altar.

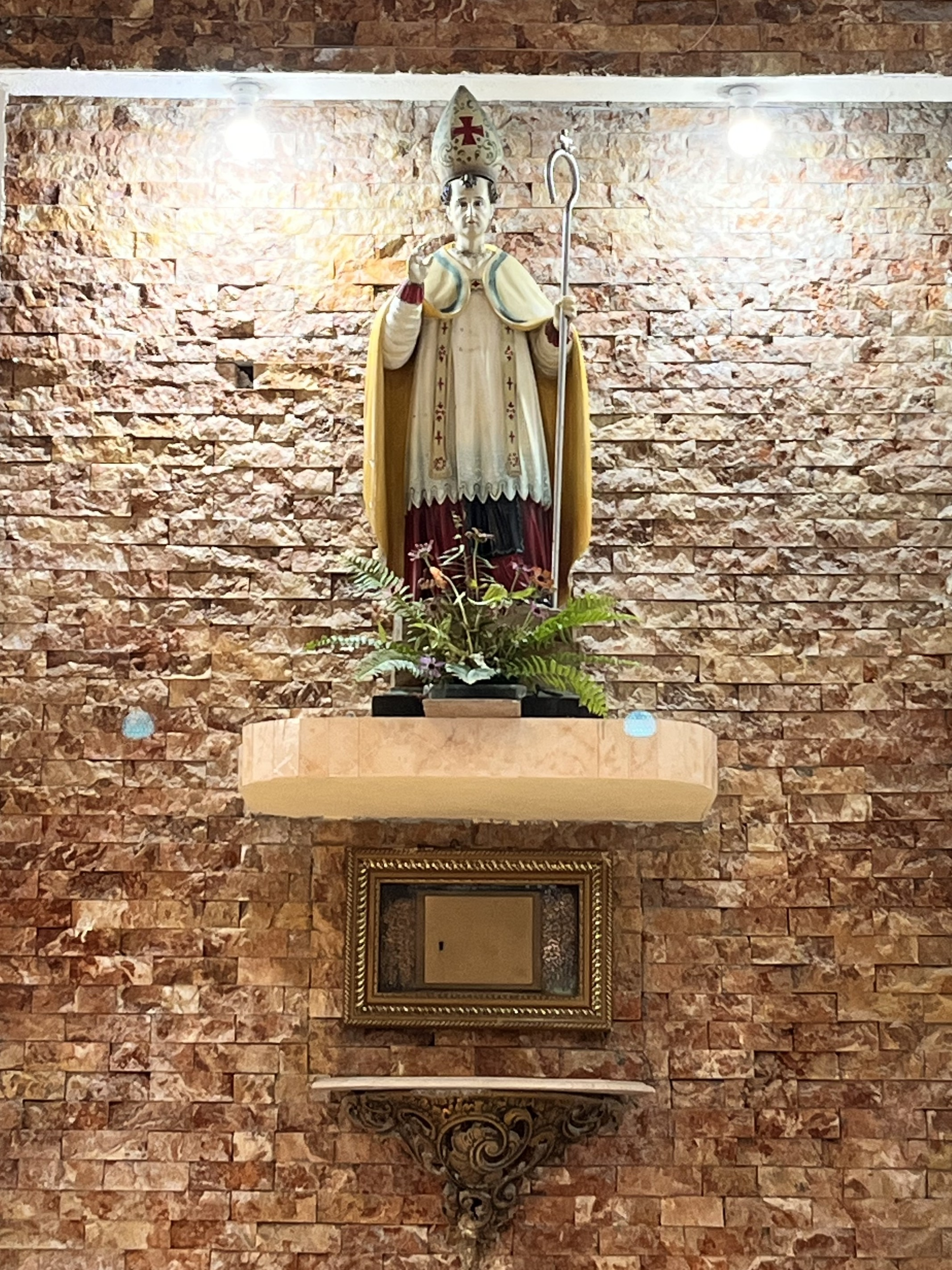
The venerated image of San Antonino de Florencia on the side altar.

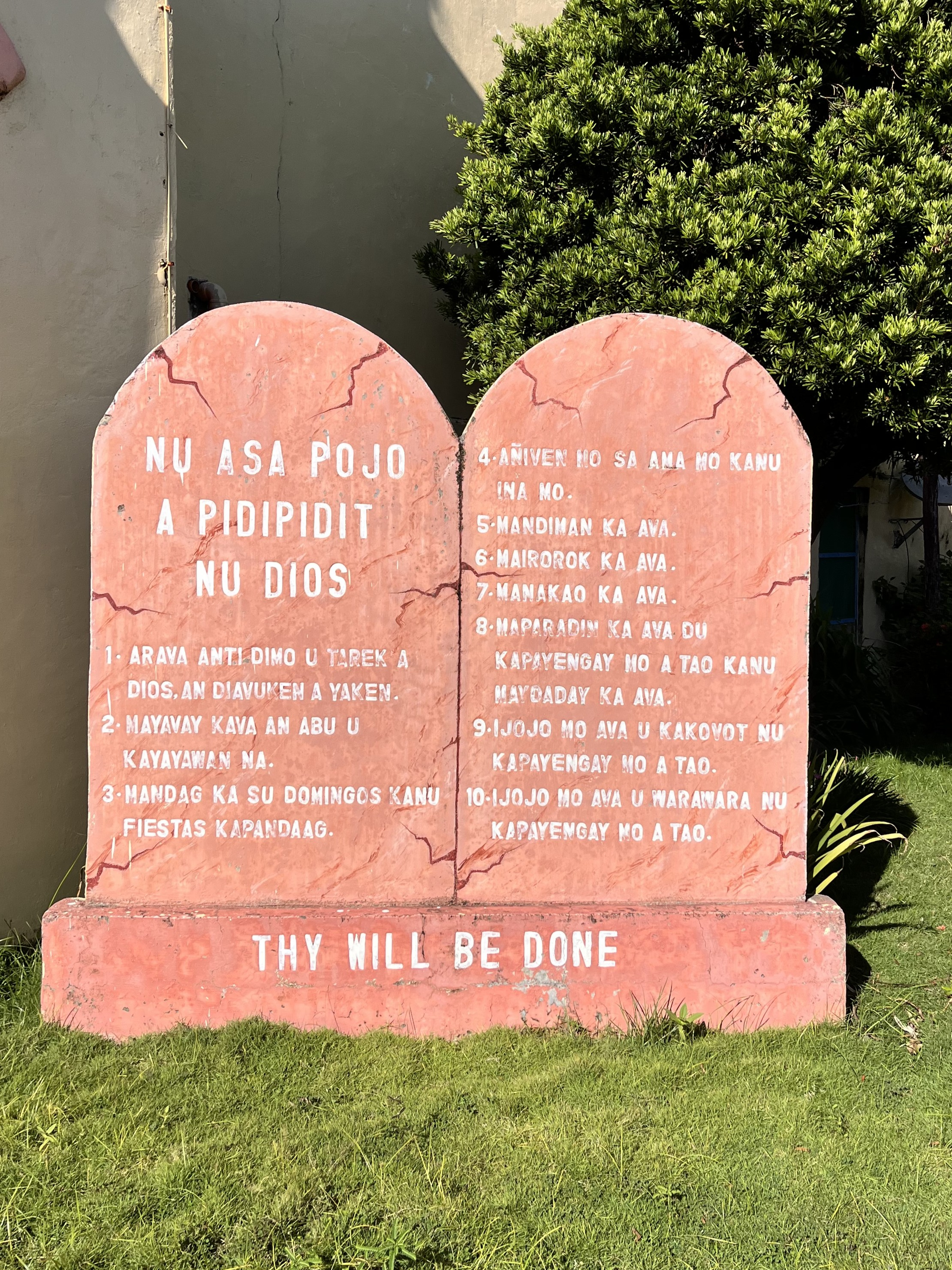
The 10 Commandments marker in Ivatan language, outside the church.

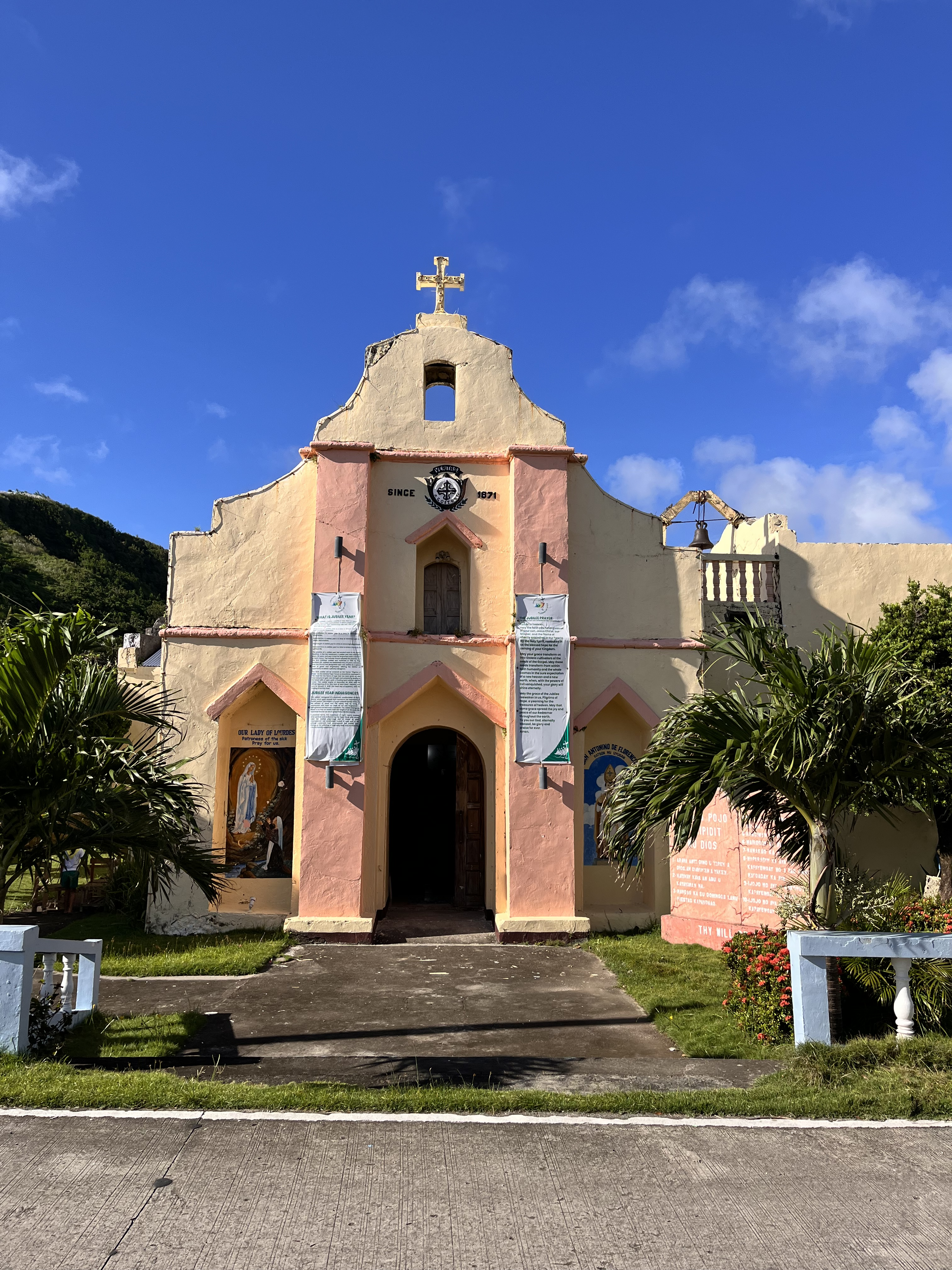
The church viewed from across the street.
