= List of barangays in Batanes =

The province of Batanes has 29 barangays comprising its 6 municipalities.

== Barangays ==
Most populous in its respective municipality (as of 2010)

Barangay	Population					Municipality
Barangay	2010	2007	2000	1995	1990	Municipality
Chanarian	334	331	334	275	325	Basco
Chavayan	169	152	180	165	193	Sabtang
Hanib	372	380	441	397	447	Mahatao
Ihubok I (Kaychanarianan)	1,665	1,649	1,517	1,465	1,361	Basco
Ihubok II (Kayvaluganan)	2,103	2,055	1,729	1,381	1,330	Basco
Imnajbu	159	139	130	147	149	Uyugan
Itbud	463	460	484	489	446	Uyugan
Kaumbakan	483	435	504	381	416	Mahatao
Kayhuvokan	1,641	1,603	1,372	1,155	1,143	Basco
Kayuganan (Poblacion)	294	278	296	283	275	Uyugan
Kayvaluganan (Poblacion)	324	326	358	346	328	Uyugan
Malakdang (Poblacion)	245	247	285	225	314	Sabtang
Nakanmuan	134	119	126	116	136	Sabtang
Panatayan	416	444	547	468	488	Mahatao
Radiwan	368	339	384	313	372	Ivana
Raele	442	436	480	395	410	Itbayat
Salagao	319	321	377	283	357	Ivana
San Antonio	1,772	1,621	1,447	1,252	1,319	Basco
San Joaquin	392	258	318	244	251	Basco
San Rafael (Idiang)	789	789	754	716	761	Itbayat
San Vicente (Igang)	230	210	203	155	170	Ivana
Santa Lucia (Kauhauhasan)	478	479	737	568	663	Itbayat
Santa Maria (Marapuy)	438	490	601	590	631	Itbayat
Santa Rosa (Kaynatuan)	841	875	1,044	860	983	Itbayat
Savidug	190	167	210	180	213	Sabtang
Sinakan (Poblacion)	552	490	526	447	548	Sabtang
Sumnanga	347	290	351	301	333	Sabtang
Tuhel (Poblacion)	332	311	329	273	291	Ivana
Uvoy (Poblacion)	312	280	403	310	373	Mahatao
Barangay	2010	2007	2000	1995	1990	Municipality
*Italicized names are former names.

[top]
