= Dora Alicia Recinos Sorto =

El Salvadorian anti-mining activist

- Born: 1976 or 1977
- Died: 26 December 2009
- Cause of death: Assassination
- Known for: Anti-mining activism

Dora Alicia Recinos Sorto (1976 or 1977 – 26 December 2009) was a Salvadoran anti-mining activist who was murdered while protesting the opening of a mine by the Pacific Rim Mining Corporation.

== Career ==
Sorto was an activist opposed to mining and a member of the Cabañas Environment Committee. She campaigned against the opening of El Dorado gold mine in the Cabañas Department of El Salvador by Pacific Rim Mining Corporation, a subsidiary of the Canadian company OceanaGold.

== Death ==
On 26 December 2009, Sorto was murdered. She was 32 years old and eight months pregnant the time of her death.

Her two-year-old son was hit in the foot with a bullet during the murder.

Sorto was one of four anti-mining activists who were murdered while protesting the opening of the mine.

== Aftermath ==
In 2010, the Committee in Solidarity with the People of El Salvador reported on the arrest of eight suspects accused or the murder of Sorto and other murdered anti-mining activists. While the officials blamed the murder on a family feud, the National Roundtable Against Metallic Mining accused authorities of ignoring obvious links to the murder and Sorto's activism. The roundtable's criticism of the authorities included claims that the suspects were "former paid promoters of the Canadian mining company Pacific Rim".

== See also ==
- Mining in El Salvador
