= El Dorado gold mine (El Salvador) =

Gold mine in El Salvador

El Dorado
- Location in El Salvador
- Location: San Isidro,Cabañas Department,El Salvador; 13°50′N 88°43′W
- Opened: 1948
- Closed: 1953
- Company: Pacific Rim Mining Corporation from 2002; Government of El Salvador present

El Dorado is a former gold mine, located San Isidro, Cabañas, El Salvador.

The mine operated from 1948 to 1953. In 2002, the location came to the attention of Dayton Mining Corporation, who then merged with Canadian company Pacific Rim Mining Corporation.

Pacific Rim was initially granted a license to explore, but after local community opposition was refused a mining license in 2008.

Four anti-mining activists were murdered, including Dora Alicia Recinos Sorto in 2009.

== Description ==
The defunct underground mine covers 144 square kilometers and is located in San Isidro village in the Cabañas Department near the San Francisco river, and 65 kilometers east of San Salvador.

The mine's owners reported estimates of 7.4 million ounces of silver and 1.2 million ounces of extractable gold.

== History ==
The mine was in operation in the mid 20th-century, according to OceanaGold, from 1948 to 1953.

Gold was discovered at the site in 2002 by Dayton Mining Corporation. The same year, Dayton merged into Vancouver-based Pacific Rim Mining Corporation; Pacific Rim planned 7,000 meters of exploratory drilling at the mine.

Pacific Rim Mining Corporation subsequently were granted a license to explore the site, but were met with protests from local villagers, who launched the "I Reject Metal Mining" campaign, due to their concerns about public health and water contamination. The National Coalition Against Metals Mining, other campaign groups and religious groups joined the opposition to the mine. In 2008, the Government of El Salvador rejected Pacific Rim's permit to mine, prompting Pacific Rim to stop exploring the site in July 2008.

Four anti-mining activists, opposed to mining in the area were murdered. Marcelo Rivera Moreno was killed in June 2009, Ramiro Rivera Gomez was killed on December 20, 2009 and Dora Alicia Recinos Sorto was killed six days later while eight months pregnant. Pacific Rim denied involvement in the murders. In 2010, the Committee in Solidarity with the People of El Salvador reported on the arrest of the eight murder suspects. While the officials blamed the murder on a family feud, the National Roundtable Against Metallic Mining accused authorities of ignoring obvious links to the murder and Sorto's activism. The roundtable's criticism of the authorities included claims that the suspects were "former paid promoters of the Canadian mining company Pacific Rim".

By 2013, no mining had occurred at the site and the government of El Salvador had seized the site. In 2009, Pacific Rim commenced legal action against El Salvador for lost profit and expenses. In 2016, an international tribunal rejected Pacific Rim's claims of $250 million compensation and ordered Pacific Rim's parent company OceanaGold to pay $8 million compensation to El Salvador to cover their legal fees.

== See also ==
- Mining in El Salvador
