= Irraya Revolt =

Gaddang Revolt
Date	6 November 1621
Location	Abbuatan, Batavag, Bolo and Pilitan villages, North Isabela province, Cagayan Valley
Result	Spanish victory

Belligerents
Gaddang people	Spanish government

Commanders and leaders
Felipe Cuntapay; Gabriel Dayag	

The Irraya Revolt, also known as the Gaddang Revolt (Tagalog: Pag-aalsa ng mga Gaddang) was an uprising by the Gaddang people of Northern Isabela that transpired on 6 November 1621. It was led by Felipe Cuntapay and Gabriel Dayag.

== History ==
On November 6, 1621, the residents of Abbuatan erected on a Friday a cross in the churchyard with much uproar and rejoicings by the natives. After two days, the Gaddang people in Abbuatan led by the convent bred, 23 year-old Felipe Cuntapay (Felix Cuntabay in other manuscripts and the acknowledged “governor of Abbuatan”) and his brother Gabriel Dayag, rose in arms because they were oppressed by vicious Spanish officials. The Irraya villages which rallied to their cause were: Abbuatan, Batavag, Bolo and Pilitan. Fray Alonso Hernandez tried to convince the insurgents but failed. Instead, the rebels requested the good priest to leave the place. After the departure of the missionaries, the Irrayas began their uprising killing the encomenderos and Spanish officials and burned their houses. After the bloody killing and looting, the rebels went up the Basili (Balisi in other manuscripts) River and built a fortification on a hill. Bernardo Lumaban and his wife Agustina Pamma saved a mutilated image of the Blessed Virgin in a muddy place after the bloody rebellion and looting. For their actions, the insurrects seized and detained them in prison.

== Cause of the revolt ==
They revolted against the encomenderos and government officials and the oppression of Spanish officials.

== Ending of the revolt ==
Fray Alonzo Hernandez, a Dominican missionary, tried to pacify them but they refused. There was a fight against abusive officials and not against friars who were "good to them", with all their ornaments and jewels of the churches. They went up the Balili River and built a fortification on a rocky hill. Pedro de Santo Tomas, a Dominican missionary, attempted to persuade the rebel leaders Felipe Cuntapay and Gabriel Dayag to surrender peacefully. Along with other missionaries, Santo Tomas were allowed to leave unharmed. Santo Tomas went back and finally succeeded in convincing the Gaddangs to lay down their arms, And thus, ending the revolt.
