= Commerce Group Corp. =

American mining company

Commerce Group Corporation
- Industry: Mining
- Headquarters: N8 W22577 Johnson Drive, Waukesha, Wisconsin, U.S.
- Key people: Edward A. Machulak (CEO and president)
- Website: www.commercegroupcorp.com

Commerce Group Corp. is an American mining company based in Waukesha, Wisconsin. The company held mining rights to various mines in El Salvador.

After mining activities at the San Sebastian Gold Mine polluted the San Sebastián River, the El Salvador government withdrew mining licences. Commerce Group, and business partner San Sebastian Gold Mines Inc attempted litigation against the government, but the International Centre for Settlement of Investment Disputes found in the government's favour.

== Organization ==
The company is based at N8 W22577 Johnson Drive, Waukesha, Wisconsin, 53186. Edward A. Machulak was the CEO and president.

== Activities ==
In the 1970s Commerce Group started industrializing, the previously artisanal, San Sebastian Gold Mine - the first time a mine in El Salvador became economically significant. In September 1987, the company formed a joint venture with U.S. company San Sebastian Gold Mines Inc to further mining in El Salvador, getting a license for San Sebastian Gold Mine simultaneously.

In 1993, the joint venture obtained mining rights for the El Modesto Mine and the San Cristóbal Mill and Plant and in March 2003 it obtained a permit for the "New San Sebastian Exploration" plus eight other locations.’

Mining of the San Sebastian Gold Mine caused Cyanide, arsenic, and mercury pollution of the San Sebastián River, fouling the drinking water source and preventing agriculture. Government testing found cyanide at nine times the legal maximum and iron levels 1,000 times higher than the limit.

In 2006, the government of El Salvador revoke the permit for the San Sebastian Gold Mine and the San Cristóbal Mill and Plant. In December that year, the joint venture requested a judicial review of the revocation. The joint venture continued to apply for permits after the revocation, but all were rejected.

On 17 March 2009, Commerce Group Corp. and San Sebastian Gold Mine filed a notice of intent to the government, alerting them of their plan to commence litigation, accusing the government of breaking terms within the Dominican Republic–Central America Free Trade Agreement (CAFTA)

On July 2, 2009, the joint venture filed an arbitration notice as per CAFTA rules, seeking $100 million of damages. The government challenged jurisdiction of the International Centre for Settlement of Investment Disputes (ICSID). The Committee in Solidarity with the People of El Salvador reported on a call from 58 organizations for the company to drop the lawsuit. The ICSID found in favour of the government, agreeing that the joint venture should have dropped its claim in the national courts before starting the international dispute resolution, dismissing the joint venture's claim.

The joint venture sought an annulment of the decision, claiming that the ICSID had overstepped its remit. The ICSID stuck an ad hoc committee to consider the annulment. In 2013, the request to annul the decision was rejected.

== See also ==
- Mining in El Salvador
