= Mining in El Salvador =

Mining in El Salvador to extract gold and other minerals from beneath the surface can be traced back to the beginning of the twentieth century but has generally been halted due to policy changes in the last two decades. There are large deposits of minerals in the mountainous areas of Central America, starting in Guatemala, throughout El Salvador, and all the way to northern Costa Rica.

Mining expanded in scope from artisanal mining to industrial mining at a mine in San Sebastián, El Salvador. Artisanal mining has occurred in El Salvador, including at the San Sebastian Gold Mine that opened in 1904. Mining became a national significant economic activity in the 1970s when U.S.-based company the Commerce Group Corp industrialised the mine.

El Salvador became the first country in the world to officially ban all forms of metal mining in 2017, following campaigns by activists, local populations, civil society organizations, community members, and the catholic church on the grounds that metallic mining is harmful to the local ecosystem and human life.

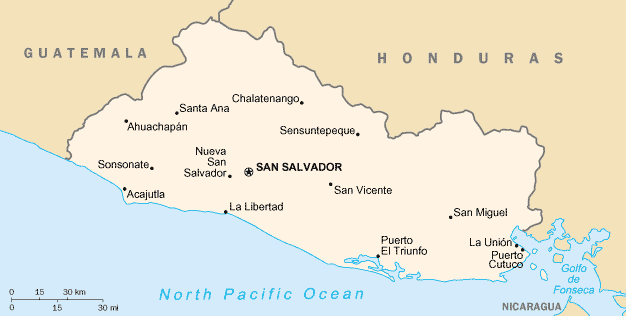
Map of El Salvador. Highlights the major municipalities.

Mining activity ceased directly after the Salvadoran Civil War. After the war, the country's right-wing government proposed designated mining zones and issued exploration licences to many foreign mining companies in order to supplement the Salvadorian economy, which led to much pushback from locals and years of social unrest and opposition from the local community based on the alleged environmental impacts of this practice.

== Political Context ==
In the post-civil-war 1990's, the two most important political parties were Nationalist Republican Alliance (ARENA) and Farabundo Martí National Liberation Front (FMLN). ARENA came into power during this time, and in the subsequent years developed an ideology centered around economic reforms that would attract foreign investment as the country recovered from the costly war. These reforms included less taxes and more protection legally for foreign companies looking to invest in the landscape. ARENA are credited with introducing neoliberal ideology into the Salvadorian government in this way, with a focus on the prioritization of privatization and economic growth. However, in 2006, despite their previous pro-mining legislation, the ARENA administration established a de facto moratorium, or an unofficial but imposed prohibition, on mining.

The left-wing Farabundo Martí National Liberation Front (FMLN), originally a guerilla movement during and directly after the civil war, launched their presidential campaign with then-journalist Mauricio Funes as their frontrunner between November 2007 and March 2009. The included strong opposition to mining practices in their campaign, and managed to obtain the presidency by the end of the race. After Funes won the presidency and served for 5 years in this position, a shift towards anti-mining opinions and legislation occurred.

== Environmental Concerns and Conflicts ==
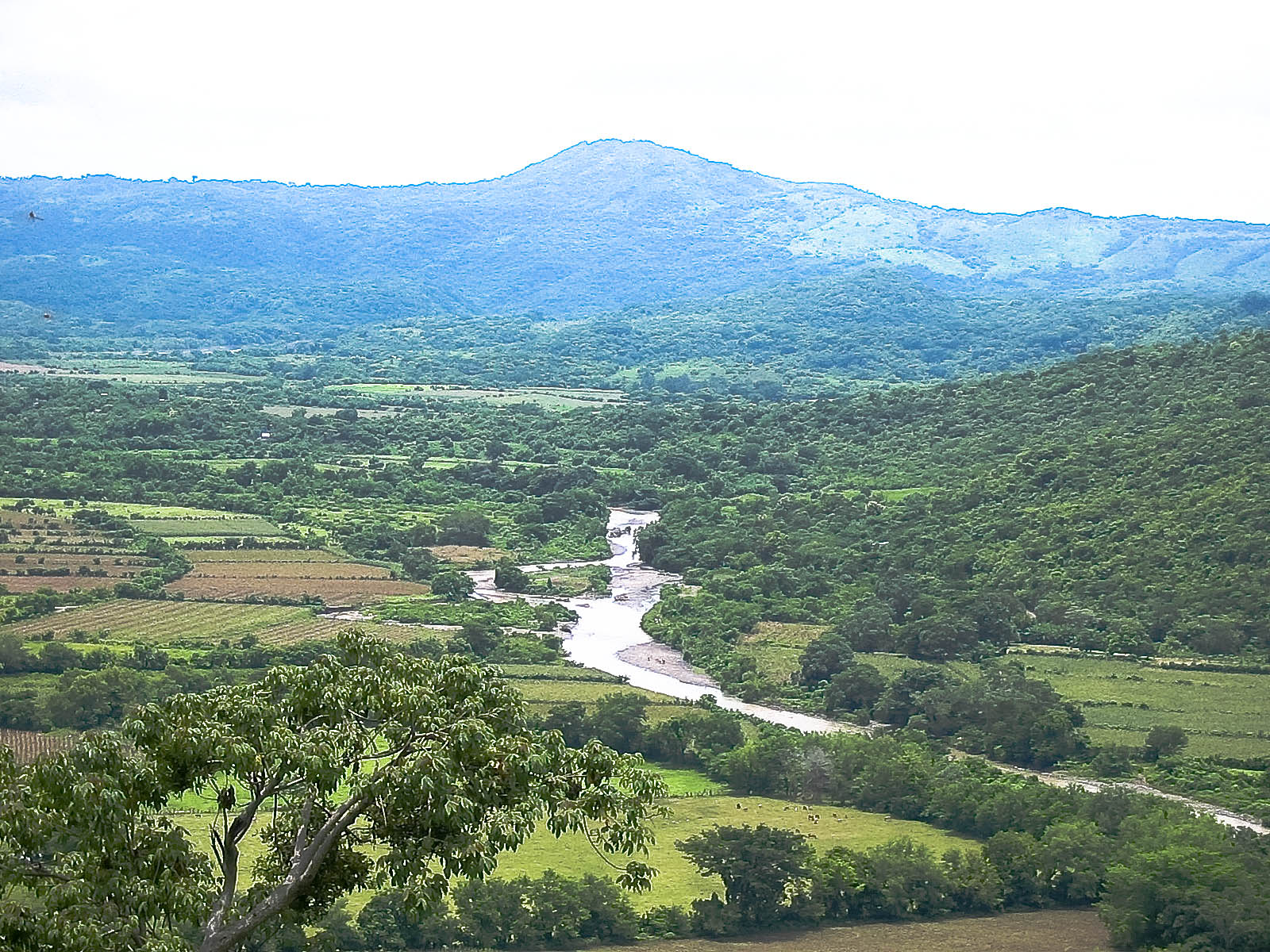
Lempa River

El Salvador is a small nation, densely populated and very vulnerable to the impacts of climate change. The Lempa River is an integral water resource for the nation, and has been negatively impacted by both resource depletion and contamination, affecting the livelihoods of those dependant on the river. The Lempa's watershed covers almost the entire country, and thus the potential contamination from mining sites placed in the territory pose a risk of long-lasting damage to environmental and human health. As a transboundary watershed shared with Guatemala and Honduras and on which El Salvador is located downstream, Salvadorans have also been concerned about the impacts of mining and other industrial activities performed in neighbouring countries.

The industrialisation of the San Sebastian Gold Mine led to massive amounts of cyanide, arsenic, and mercury poisoning of the San Sebastián River. This issue has been highlighted by the Asociación de Desarrollo Económico y Social (ADES) organization, located in Cabañas, El Salvador, who seek to address the alleged long-term environmental impacts of metal mining.

Local opposition to mineral mining is derived from the effects on natural resources such as water from the Lempa River and the contribution to overall ecosystem degradation in the region. According to a 2011 report by the United States Agency for International Development, El Salvador has been deforested by 85% since the 1960s, and approximately 90% of surface water is polluted.

In 2005, Canadian company Au Martinique Silver began prospecting in Chalatenango, a municipality desired by mining companies for its rich gold deposits but also very sensitive to the potential negative impacts of mining practices. This project was objected to by the majority of community leaders, who with support from U.S. activist organization the Madison Arcatao Sister City Project, successfully halted the project in 2006.

The government agency General Directorate of Energy, Hydrocarbons and Mines was formed in October 2021.

=== El Dorado Mine ===
The El Dorado gold mine site was acquired in 2002 by the Pacific Rim Mining Corporation. It is located approximately 65 km (40 mi) east of the city of San Salvador. The mine had been in operation, according to Pacific Rim Mining Corporation's parent company OceanaGold, from 1948 to 1953. Pacific Rim attempted to obtain exploitation rights by submitting their Environmental impact assessment (EIA) in 2004, but it was never granted by the Salvadorian Ministry of Economy due to Pacific Rim's failure to complete the appropriate requirements in terms of adequately reporting their planned use of ground water. Pacific Rim later enacted a lawsuit against the Salvadorian government in 2009 asserting that they were owed a mining concession despite the moratorium on mining currently in place. In 2016, the company lost this suit by a ruling from the International Centre for Settlement of Investment Disputes (ICSID).

== Social Influences and Organizations ==
=== Grassroots Organizations ===
In 2005, the National Roundtable Against Metallic Mining (also known as "La Mesa" or "Mesa Nacional") was formed by local organizations, such as NGOs, religious and academic groups, and community activists that opposed mining practices in El Salvador, acting as a figurehead for the anti-mining movement within the country.

A "Week Against Mining" was held in June 2006 across the country in order to protest extractive mining practices, as well as educate the population about the potential risks of allowing such projects to take place in El Salvador. This shifted the majority opinion of the people within the country into a dislike of the idea of mining practices.

Grassroots organizations, civil society organizations, and local populations mobilized largely by the National Roundtable Against Metallic Mining was involved in lawmaking to ban mining from the mid-2000s. In 2017, the ban on metallic mining was passed by the Legislative Assembly that can to a large extent be considered a citizen ban, even if an institution like the Catholic Church was largely involved in the latest draft.

=== The Catholic Church ===
The Catholic Church in Latin America is an important social factor in terms of widely believed ideas and views on morality. In 2007, Archbishop Fernando Sáenz Lacalle announced that the El Salvador's Church leadership was overall anti-mining within the country, based upon the argument that environmental concerns outnumber likely economic benefits. This move solidified the Catholic leadership as the first organization to define environmental protection as more important than economic growth, mirroring the growing social sentiment of this same vein within El Salvador. Because of the authority the Church held in the strongly-religious El Salvador, this position made anti-mining all the more popular.

== See also ==
- Economy of El Salvador
- Politics of El Salvador
- Salvadoran Civil War
