= San Sebastian Gold Mine =

Gold mine in El Salvador

- Location in El Salvador
- Location: Santa Rosa de Lima, La Unión; 13.646349°N 87.904818°W
- Products: Gold
- Opened: 1904
- Closed: 2006
- Company: Commerce Group Corp.

San Sebastian Gold Mine is a gold mine located 2.5 miles northwest of Santa Rosa de Lima in the La Unión Department of El Salvador.

It has been artisanaly mined since 1904 and industrially mined since the 1970s.

Commerce Group Corp., the U.S. company who ran the mine in since the 1970s had their license revoked in 2006, following the pollution of the San Sebastián River. The license revocation prompted the owners to unsuccessfully sue the government, before abandoning the mine.

== Description ==
San Sebastian Gold Mine is located 2.5 miles northwest of Santa Rosa de Lima in the La Unión Department of El Salvador.

Commerce Group Corp. calculated that the mine has 1.5 million ounces of gold reserves.

== History ==
The mine was first operated in 1904 and artisanal mining continued until the 1970s.

U.S. company Commerce Group purchased the mine and started industrializing it and turning it into El Salvador's first economically significant mine. In September 1987, the Commerce Group formed a joint venture with U.S. company San Sebastian Gold Mines Inc to further explore mining in El Salvador and simultaneously received a permit to extract gold from the mine.

The mining process caused polluted the San Sebastián River with cyanide, arsenic, and mercury, fouling drinking water supplies and preventing agriculture. Government testing found cyanide at nine times the legal maximum and iron levels 1,000 times higher than the limit. In 2006, the government withdrew the company's permit, provoking an unsuccessful litigation by the company against government (Pac Rim Cayman LLC v. Republic of El Salvador). The company ultimately abandoned the mine, although pollution in the San Sebastian River remains.

== See also ==
- Mining in El Salvador
