= Ga'dang language =

Austronesian language spoken in the Philippines

Ga'dang
- Gaddang, Gâdang
- Native to: Philippines
- Region: Luzon
- Ethnicity: Gaddang people
- Native speakers: 6,000 (2002)
- Language family: Austronesian: Malayo-Polynesian; Philippine; Northern Luzon; Northern Cordilleran; Ga'dang

Language codes
- ISO 639-3: gdg
- Glottolog: gada1258
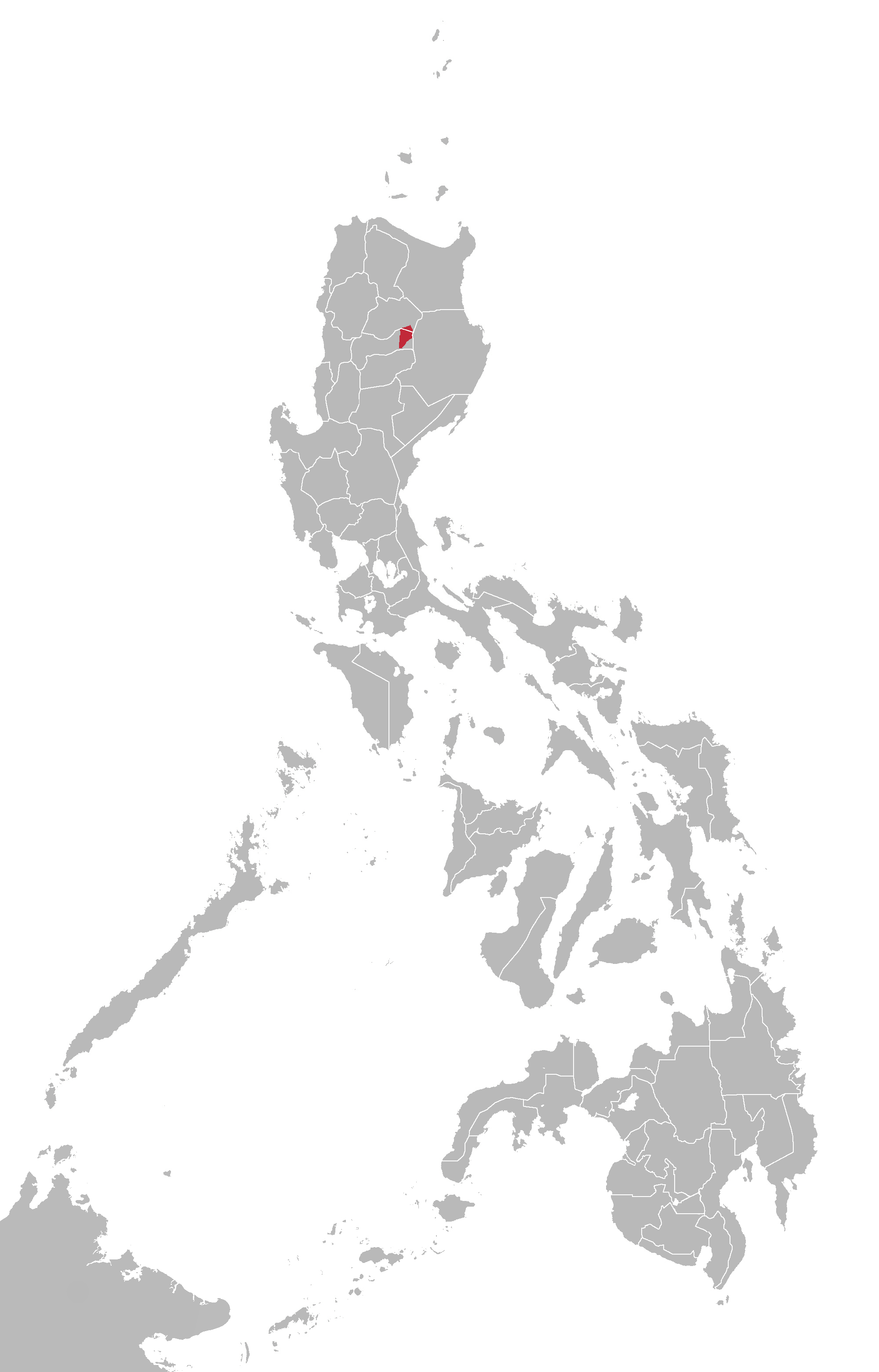
- Area where Gaʼdang language is spoken according to Ethnologue maps

Ga'dang or Gâdang is an Austronesian language spoken in Northern Luzon, Philippines particularly in Paracelis, Mountain Province, Luzon; Alfonso Lista, Ifugao; and Tabuk, Kalinga. There are some residents of speakers in Aurora and Nueva Vizcaya. Many Ga'dang speakers speak Ilocano as their second language.

== Phonology ==
The Ga'dang language is related to Ibanag, Itawis, Malaueg and others. It is distinct in that it features phonemes not present in many neighboring Philippine languages. As an example, the "f", "v", "z" and "j" sounds appear in Ga'dang. There are notable differences from other languages in the distinction between "r" and "l" (and between "r" and "d"), and the "f" sound is a voiceless bilabial fricative somewhat distinct from the fortified "p" sound common in many Philippine languages (but not much closer to the English voiceless labiodental fricative). Finally, the (Spanish) minimally-voiced "J" sound has evolved to a plosive (so the name Joseph sounds to the American ear as Kosip).

=== Vowels ===
Most Ga'dang speakers use six vowel sounds: /a/, /i/, /u/, /ɛ/, /o/, /ɯ/

=== Consonants ===
Ga'dang features doubled consonants, so the language may sound guttural to Tagalog, Ilokano, and even Pangasinan speakers. The uniqueness of this circumstance is often expressed by saying Ga'dang speakers have "a hard tongue".

For example: tudda (tood-duh). which means rice.

Ga'dang is also one of the Philippine languages which is excluded from [ɾ]-[d] allophony, they only contrast before consonants and word-final positions; otherwise, they become allophones where [d] is only located in word-initial positions and after consonants & [ɾ] is only pronounced between vowels. In Spanish & Ilocano loanwords, [d] and [ɾ] contrast in all word positions. The <rr> is pronounced as alveolar trill [r]. Before consonants and word-final positions, [ɾ] is in free variation with trill [r].

== Samples ==
Addungan (Ahunan) – Daungan, sampahan, piyer. Bisin - Gutom; pagkagutom; taggutom; tagsalat Da’ngan (Abutan) – lampasan o sapitin ang hinahabol Furaw - kulay puti; puti Gagginafan -pinanggalingan ng isang tao/grupo. Mga sinaunang tao. Isalak - iligtas; tubusin; patibayin; sagipin; Kaaruyo (agwat) – Kalayo, patlang, distansiya, pagitan. Liwat - kasalanan, pagdudulot ng sama ng loob; pagpapagalit, sala Maaddang (Abot) - kuha, Maaaring kunin ng kamay. Naburbog (Agnas) – Pagkabulok. O'gan - Labis, Sobra-sobra Palattog - baril; armas Ron - taon Siri - Kasinungalingan; kabulaanan Tetay - Tulay Umunag - lumusong; pumasok; sumapi; Wa'lat - sakripisyo Ya'lig - Buhat Aroyu - layo, distansiya Baggi - katawan; laman; pangangatawan Diyat - Salat, Kapos, Kulang. Dukha, Mahirap, Dahop. Fungan - unan Gansing - Kambing Ilak - Lamok Karangat - nakakatakot, napakahayop, napakasamang tao, Halimaw limmampaw - Gumaan; Magpagaan; pagaanan; makagaan; pagaanin Mananikkad - gumagalaw; makakilos; maikilos; ikilos Nanset - baliw; ulol; loko; hibang; sira ulo Ofag - Satanas Pakoman - Patawarin; magpatawag; magpasensya Ra'bun - Patutunguhan; Salak - ligtas Tutunggung - tukso; tinutukso Unag - Loob, looban wawwang - Ilog Anggam - Gusto; kagustuhan Balibali -panlilinlang; dayain; magdaya; manlinlang Dinandam - Iniisip; Naisip Fukaw - tawag sa puti ang balihibo na manok Galet - Sakit sa balat; Galis Ilap - Kutsilyo Kuyong - Tiyan lubbon - baryo, Barangay, lugar Maakkan - Pagkain; pweding kainin Nadammat - Mabigat; mahirap buhatin Payak - Pakpak Rarag - Latik Sumallong - pumasok Tarut - Tamad; batugan Usin - Ari ng lalaki Walo - Walo Abul - Hindi makapagsalita; walang imik; pipi Bulon - Kasama; Katulong; kasabay; kakabit Daffug - Kalabaw Furakkan - Pagpapakain ng mga manok ng bigas o mais na isinasaboy sa lupa Gakkurog - totoo; tama and sinasabi Inggaddon - Sobrang damot Kakarefin - Makkahawak kamay lubag - lupa Mannakadama - makapangyarihan; Naraggal - pangit; Hindi maganda; masama, Hindi mabuti Pakkatafulu - ikasampung porsyento; maliit na bahagi Sosawit - Dragonfly Tanna - Kulam Ulipat - bulate sa tiyan Watay - Palakol Akkanan - Kainin Bungot - galit Dandamman - isipin Fukkol - tawag sa tambok ng ari ng babae Gogawa - Pato I'bo - ihi Kattatalaw - Nakakatakot lussok - paso; napaso; napaso ng mainit na bagay Matarut - Tinatamad; walang alam na gawain; ayaw gumawa ng mga gawain Natay - Pumanaw; patay; namatay; sumakabilang buhay Pittatan - napagisahan; pinagtulungan Sakkalang - Singsing Taggam - langgam Uwwaw - unggoy Wara - meron Abbing - bata; murang edad Balibal - baon Dingngag - narining Fukok - bahay ng mga baboy Gafa - Iya'da - ibigay Kelkeg - Kalbo, Walang buhok Laman - karne o tawag sa baboy ramo Mangngan - Kumain Namumpol - paghataw; pumapalo; pagpalo Pangigi’bat (Agahan) – Almusal. Sinag - Araw (Sun) Taronan - Hintayin Urong - susong pilipit Wayi - kamag-anak Abbafarulon - Pagkakaisa; pagkakasundo; pagsasama Bufa'bakat - matatandang babai Dingngaggan - pakinggan Gumabuwat - bumangon Iya'dan - bigyan Kolak - Kapatid Layag - Taenga Mabbungubungut - Galit na galit Nalawad - maganda; maayos; mainam Piyyak - sisiw; maliit na hayop n my pakpak. Sesebbukal - Bilog Tonan - Hintay Unin - puwet Alang - isang maliit na bahay na lalagyan ng mga naaning palay bufon - hukay sa mga gilid ng ilog at mga sapa kung saan nag-iigib ng inuming tubig. Dandaman - ihawin Gured - Galis Aso, dusdos or pagpapalot Iya'dang -(Iahon) ilabas o kunin mula sa tubig papunta sa pampang o dalampasigan Kawasan - Sitaw Latag - bayag Mapparanak - Mga Magulang Nakam - Isip; isipan Palataw - bolo; Itak Sudukan -Tusukin Tatabban - Kausapin Uffo - English (Legs) Arakam - isang kagamitan sa may latim ginagamit sa pag-aani ng palay Bafay - Babai Dinandaman - inihaw Gafa - tapayan; sisidlang luwad para sa tubig Inggad - Taong madamot Kalubasa - Kalabasa Lima - Lima Mabbini - Pagtatanim ng palay Nannakam - Mabait; mabuti; Maayos Palattog - Baril Sirwat - Ilaw Tanganan - Iba Uran - Ulan Akkan - Hindi Befay - gilid ng bubong ng bahay na gawa sa kugon; kung saan nahuhulog ang tubig ulan. Dafug -lugar o kalan na ginagamit sa pagluluto, karaniwang binubuo ng tatlong batong pinatayo na pinagpapatungan ng kaldero o palayok Garosa - isang sasakyang lalagyan ng mga ani na hinihila ng kalabaw. Iyyong - Ilong kamatit - kamatis Lamag - buwaya Manset - Baliw Narrakkat - Masama; pangit; Hindi maganda; Hindi maayos Pakitatabban - Pakiusapan Taggat - Punong Narra Anangka - Langka Bufabbay - kababaihan Dammang - Pampang na nasa tapat o kabilang panig ng isang ilog, sapa o dagat Gaddang - Balat Iyyat - Igat Kusa - Pusa Kiray - kilay Makkakarolak - Magkakapatid Ngipan - Ngipin Papet - Ampalaya Takki - Paa Ammowawan - isang punong tinatawag na sagat ng mga ilocano; Molave Banig - isang kakaibang pangyayari o pakiramdam na itinuturing na gawa ng mga nilalang na Hindi nakikita. Dakkag - Buwan Gafit - taro; Gabi I'log - Itlog Kusara - Kutsara Laggud - suklay Maddadaruffun - Magtutulungan Nakaki'bo - Nakaihi Pakolu - prutas na Makopa Tulang - buto ng tao o hayop Angiyaran - ginagamit na pangkayod ng niyog Bongun - Lamay sa patay Dumambal - Sasalubung Itubba - ilagay sa apoy Kuramang - mga daliri Langalay - Kamay Maddadaruffunetam - magtutulungan tayo Nakatalaw - Natakot Pattakayan - Sasakyan Tafungaw -gulay na tinatawag na upo Aggabbot - anumang ginagamit na pangbutas Bukal - puto ng bunga Dambalan - sasalubungin Igagad - Itali Kimay - kuto na maliit palang o kapipisa; isang maliit na parasitiko na insekto na pumapasok at kumakain ng dugo mula sa anit ng kanilang host. Lidoy - Taro; Gabi Maddammang - tumawid o lumipat mula sa isang pampang patungo sa kabilang pampang; lumipat mula sa isang panig, lugar o kalagayan patungo sa iba. Ngilab - Walang Ngipin o nabawasan ang ngipin Pantad - bundok Taggi - isa Attay - tae Bukakong - kutong magulang na; isang maliit na parasitiko na insekto na pumapasok at kumakain ng dugo mula sa anit ng kanilang host. Duddulaw - Kulay Dilaw Iggamman - Hawakan Kamat - Kamay Madanagan -nakaramdam ng kaba; nag-aalala o natakot sa isang sitwasyon Naari - Natanggal Pito - Pito Tallo - Tatlo Awom - isang damong nakakain tinatawag na kulitis pero ito yung walang tinik Baggat - Laman; Bigas Dokkal - Malaki Iggam - Hawak Kararang - bulateng lupa Mabul - Hindi nakakapagsalita Nalambutan - Nabitawan Palagyok - Pito ( Whistle) Tafulo - sampu Allay - isang damong nakakain tinatawag na kulitis na may tinik Bibissang - Maliit Dumandan - Sumama Inunoy - gumaling na sa sakit; gumanda na ang kalagayan Kulat - isang uri ng kabuti o yung tinatawag na kabuteng pamaypay o kabueng oyster Musil - Tinggil o kuntil ay isang kasangkapan pangkasarian ng isang babae Nayag - Nagtawag ng kasama o tao Pa'ma - hinlalaki Tataggi - iisa Abok - Buhok Bitabit - gulay na tinatawag na bataw Daping - Uling; libag Iwagga - Ibaba; ibaba ang gamit Kabatitit - patola na mayroong tagaytay Marakafe - Ipil - Ipil Nandifafa - nasa bandang ibaba Tatot - isang Daan Afuto - Puso; puso ng saging Busilad - isda Darusot - Dausdos Iwaggam - Ilagay; ibaba mo ang gamit kabatinggan - patola na walang tagaytay Maddarusot - Magpadaosdos Nasudok - Natusok Tarifu - isang Libo Afu - lolo/lola Battunoy - umayos na mula sa pagkakasakit Do'dot - buhok sa katawan ng tao; balahibo Intufukan - Hanapin Kali - isang klase ng ibon na kumakain ng sisiw ng manong Mayyot - Pagtatalik Nakatto - Nabale o Naputol Tanggil - Pangil Adwa - dalawa Binalbag - panggatong na hinati-hati gamit ang palakol Dinnat - maya bird; isang maliliit na ibon na pesti sa palayan Ifot - Buntot kikit - hinliliit Mayyotira - Nagtatalik Nakkayo - pumuntang kumuha ng panggatong Tudda - kanin Appat - Apat Bara'ngal - kung saan nagkakasalubong mga daanan na magkaiba nag pinanggalingan o pupuntahan Dapan - Bakas Iyabok - Ihalo; halo haloin kulod - maliit na bundok Mattakay - Sasakay Nabanggal - tawag sa amoy ng tao kapag Hindi naliligo o naglinis sa katawan Tolay - Tao Annam - Anim Bu'law - leeg Diwanan - Kanan Iyanaw - Iuwi Kammaral - mga Hindi dapat gamin kasi Hindi maganda sa paningin ng Tao o ng Diyos Mattatarabbag - Mag-uusap Nabansit - mabaho Asyam - siyam Bungaw - Paglaki ng bayag ng lalaki na sumasit ang bayag at ang itlog dahil sa pamamaga. Dawi - Kaliwa Itan - Tignan Ka'gan - Ayaw Madulig - Gugulong Nadabbak - Gumuho Afoy - apoy Butali - sakit sa balat na tinatawag na pigsa. Dilod - tumutukoy sa pababang agos bahagi ng isaang ayong tubig gaya ng ilog Kita - tutuli; dumi sa loob ng taenga Manikkad - Gumagalaw Nataggat - matigas Afog - apog; isa sa mga sangkap ng nganga o moma Balingongaw - likod na bahagi ng katawan ng tayo taas kunti ng ateng bewang Diraya - tumutukoy sa dereksiyon papunta kung saan galing ang agos ng isang anyong tubig gaya ng ilog kararag - Dalangin Mangat - Huminga Nadingngag - narining Ayog - niyog Bilat - Karayum Dabbak - Bangin Kimat - Kidlat Marang - Humingi Ngan - Pangalan Atod - Tuhod Bitun - bituin; Tala Dungul - bahagi ng mga binti mula sa buko sa taas ng talambakan hanggang sa baba ng mga tuhod Mayag - Tumawag Awan - Wala Balay - Bahay Daki - Tartar sa mga ngipin, na tinatawag ding dental calculus, magsapang na deposito na maaring mag-ipon ng mga dumi sa mga ngipin. Mamapatay - Papatay Alu - halo; kadalasang gamit sa paghahanda ng play/bigas partikular bilang pambayo ng palay upang maihiwalay at maalis ang ipa Bafoy - baboy Danggo - Sibuyas Mangngangoli - Mabubuhay Muli Attong - Lusong ginagamit sa paghahanda ng play/bigas partikular bilang pambayo ng palay upang maihiwalay at maalis ang ipa Dayud - Duyan Manafuli - Babalik Akun - damong kugon na ginagamit sa bubong ng bahay Dammaral - Salamat Miyunek - Iyaakyat Apay - palay Dalan - Daan Munek - Aakyat Abuk - Buhok Duyog - Pingga; Plato Metuldu - Magtuturo Dappit - Dalampasigan Meyabbang - Magtatapon Afa - Balikat Dekat - kakanin Meya'lig - Magbubuhat Afot - bawang Miguyod - hihilain ka Adon - Dahon Mito'yod - itutulak ka Atu - Aso Minum - Uminum Manalog - Lumangoy Manantaw - Papaano Maddaggun - Kasalukuyan o patuloy pa Makigumallak - Pakiusap; nakikiusap
