= Sandy Pollack =

American activist (1948–1985)

Sandy (Alexandra) Pollack (1948–1985) was an American Communist activist. She is best known for her involvement in the founding of the Committee in Solidarity with the People of El Salvador (CISPES), which was the focus of two highly controversial FBI investigations. One addressed possible violations of the Foreign Agents Registration Act (FARA), in which her personal contact with Farid Handal, brother of Salvadoran Communist leader Shafik, was called into question. The other concerned alleged tangible support of terrorist activities perpetrated by or on behalf of the Frente Farabundo Martí para la Liberación Nacional, FMLN and Frente Democrático Revolucionario FDR under the guise of international solidarity. The first case was dropped for lack of evidence. She was killed in a plane crash before the second case was settled.

== Personal life ==
Sandy Pollack was born to Dr. Cecelia and Mr. Harry Pollack. Her father was a first generation Polish immigrant. Her mother studied neuropsychology in Russia and developed the "Inter-sensory Reading Method" (now called Process Phonics), authored several books on teaching, and wrote an academic piece on the Cuban literacy campaign titled Teaching Reading in the Cuban Primary Schools.

She had a middle-class upbringing in Queens, New York. Her parents were active leftists, participating in protests against military recruitment at high schools and hosting YES Club (Youth for Education and Social Action) gatherings in their home.

Sandy married Terry Cannon, son of prize-winning novelist Josephine Johnson and Grant Cannon editor in chief of the Farm Quarterly, in 1971 after having met in Cuba while both were attending a celebration to commemorate the disastrous July 26, 1953 armed attack on the Moncada Barracks in Cuba by a band of rebels orchestrated by Fidel Castro.

In 1985, she was killed along with 32 others, in a plane crash.

== Political activism ==
=== United States ===
Pollack's political mentor was Alberto Moreau, decades her senior. Moreau was a lifelong communist, had been instrumental in establishing communist parties in several Latin American countries, and had co-directed a school in Los Angeles created by the National Education Committee of the US Communist Party (CPUSA) known as the National School for Mexican Cadres in the 1950s.

Pollack herself became a member of the CPUSA in 1967, during her junior year in college at Boston University, where she attended daily meetings on campus. "Sandy organized openly as a communist. She had a fundamental commitment to the mass anti-war movement… and the Communist Party's role within that movement." She eventually served on the party's National Council and on its International and Peace and Solidarity Committees.

In 1968, she helped to organized Boston University's largest demonstration to date in response to the assassination of Martin Luther King. Later in the year she participated in the 1968 Chicago Democratic Conventionprotests. Pollack was also among protesters of the Republican National Convention in 1972. That same year, she and her husband founded the short-lived Tricontinental News Service (TNS). During its two years in publication, TNS was the only source of Vietnamese radio accounts of the Christmas bombings of Hanoi and was one of the few sources for Vietnamese, Cuban and Palestinian political text.

Pollack served as the director of the Students for a Democratic Society (SDS) housing committee in Boston, which engendered the Boston Tenants Action Council that took on slumlords using direct action. She served as the office manager of the Young Worker's Liberation League (YWLL), a temporary configuration of the Young Communist League (YCL), and opened the New York office of the Angela Davis Defense Committee. Davis, who later ran as CPUSA vice-presidential candidate twice, had been arrested (and was later acquitted) on charges related to the murder of Marin County Superior Court Judge Harold Haley.

By 1979 Pollack had become associate director and treasurer of the newly founded US Peace Council, a chapter of the Soviet front organization the World Peace Council, which admitted in 1989 that it received 90 per cent of its funding from the Soviet Union. She was responsible for the council's international solidarity activities and in that capacity she organized US tours for Reverend Ernesto Cardenal the Nicaraguan revolutionary poet, liberation theologian, and now Nobel laureate; Quilapayun, a Chilean band in exile; and a group of South African students.

In 1982, she was a key organizer of the then-largest march in history, which brought together close to 1 million people including a lead delegation of 25,000 children, in New York City to protest against the nuclear buildup between the US and the Soviet Union. Pollack was quoted in the press explaining that some 200 lawyers and an additional 1,500 civilian "peacekeepers" would be dispersed along the route. The FBI, in testimony to the House Intelligence Committee on July 14, 1982, claimed that Soviet front groups were "actively involved" in manifesting the march, but they were unable to produce evidence of significant Soviet influence. Pollack responded to the accusations saying that they are "just a way of trying to reduce the legitimacy of the peace movement."

=== Central America ===
In February 1979, USPC and NACLA hosted the National Conference on Nicaragua (among other participating sponsors were National Lawyer's Guild, National Council of Churches (NCC), Washington Office on Latin America (WOLA), and 5 Congressmembers). Pollack participated in her dual role as a USPC and CPUSA representative. The conference passed a resolution to carry out various solidarity acts including educating Congress, holding demonstrations, calling for a boycott of Nicaraguan goods, etc.

In 1980 Pollack co-founded the Committee in Solidarity with the People of El Salvador (CISPES), a leftist group in opposition to the Reagan administration's Central America policy, and served on its national council the rest of her life. The organization, which grew to have over 300 regional chapters, came under DOJ and FBI scrutiny shortly after emerging based on the alleged travel diary of Farid Handal, brother of then Communist Party leader Shafik Handal, that was supposedly seized by the Salvadoran National Guard during raids on Salvadoran rebel safehouses and handed over to the CIA. A story about the diary made its way into a John Birch Society publication Review of the News and a Republican House of Representative staffer passed a copy on to the FBI. The diary was said to outline Farid's visit to the US and his meetings with Pollack, in her dual capacity as USPC and CPUSA representative, and with the WOLA, NCC, Amnesty International, Congressmembers, and others with the expressed and sole purpose of creating a solidarity network in the US for the Salvadoran rebels.

From August to December 1981 the FBI conducted a 3-month inquiry (something less than an investigation) into whether CISPES was merely a front organization for the Salvadoran communists, thereby placing the organization in violation of FARA. CISPES came into being by way of two founding conferences, one on each coast, in which various Salvadoran rebels participated. This was only a few months after Handal's trip in May 1980, during which he not only met with Pollack, according to her biography published by the US Peace Council, but she served as his interpreter and arranged meetings with affinity groups and Congress members for him in DC.

However, members of the Los Angeles chapter, in response to allegations that CISPES was formed at the behest of Handal, claimed that they had been informally working together for a year before the founding conference in October. In the end, the FBI could not authenticate the diary and found no other verifiable evidence to prove direct control of CISPES by a foreign entity or to warrant further investigation. The case was dropped pending new developments.

In early 1982, Pollack and then USPC National Director Heidi Tarver travelled to Mexico City to set up the World Front in Solidarity with the People of El Salvador. Also among the founding organizations were the Palestinian Liberation Organization, OSPAAL and ICAP, and the World Federation of Trade Unions In 1983. the FMLN facilitated her clandestine visit to guerrilla controlled territory in El Salvador to gather information for a series of news articles.

By March 1983, the FBI had received what it considered to be sufficient information to open a full investigation into whether CISPES was providing financial and other types of aid in support of the terrorist activities of the FMLN and FDR. The initial scope of the investigation only covered CISPES leaders, such as Pollack, but later mushroomed into including all members of 180 CISPES chapters as well as nearly 200 other groups that had the slightest connection to CISPES. The new investigation hinged mostly on information supplied by an informant, Frank Varelli, who the FBI later admitted had not been vetted properly and should never have been taken seriously.

While it was public knowledge that CISPES was coordinating efforts in the US, among affinity groups and especially churches, to provide humanitarian aid to Salvadorans living in rebel controlled areas, they were unable to directly show funding of rebel military or terrorist activities. The investigation was closed in 1985 shortly after Pollack's death. Later inquiries into the mishandling of the investigation led to disciplinary action against six FBI personnel and the resignation of the FBI officer responsible for handling Varelli.

=== Cuba ===
In November 1969, Pollack travelled to Cuba on the first Venceremos Brigade trip. The brigade embraces civil disobedience by encouraging and facilitating the violation of the US ban on travel to Cuba, a component of the US embargo. It arranges illegal trips to the island during which visitors engage in "solidarity" work (e.g. agricultural or construction). These trips continue today. According to debriefing statements made to the FBI by a Cuban Intelligence officer who defected in 1983, the brigade was conceived of and, in Pollack's day, was controlled by Cuban Intelligence officer Alfredo Garcia Almeida, chief of the North American Section of the Americas Department and former political counselor at the Cuban Mission to the United Nations in NYC.

When Pollack next returned to Cuba in 1971, she had become the brigade's national leader and treasurer. By that time, a broad range of activists from around the country comprised the organization. Such diversity presented a challenge that sometimes erupted. For example, Black Nationalism divided the New York group and a faction in St. Louis threatened members of the national committee at gunpoint. Pollack remained active in Venceremos Brigade leadership until her death 16 years later.

Over the years her relationships with Cuban diplomats serving in the US became so close that several of them wrote formal letters of condolence, eulogies, and poems to her memory many of which are included in her biography.

== Death ==
In January, 1985, Pollack presented a paper titled "Reaganomics: Cornerstone of US Aggression" at a peace conference in Havana, Cuba. She boarded a plane in Havana on Saturday, January 19, bound for Managua, Nicaragua. The plane crashed due to mechanical failure just after take-off; no one survived. On board with Sandy were the vice-president of the Central Bank of Nicaragua, the international relations director of the Sandinista trade unions, the young daughter of Sandinista Commander Doris Maria Tijerino, and the wife and infant of the Nicaraguan ambassador to Cuba.

Fidel Castro, along with thousands of Cubans, attended a ceremony for the victims. Castro placed a wreath on her grave that read "To Sandy, from the Commander-in-Chief." Cuba's newswire Prensa Latina quoted a letter to the families of the victims from Pollack's parents and US Peace Council Director Michael Myerson: "Our beloved Sandy dedicated her whole life and all her energies in defense of the Cuban and Nicaraguan revolutions. It is symbolic that she spent her last hours in Cuba and on the way to Nicaragua."

Two weeks after her death a memorial was held at the famous Riverside Church in Harlem. It was attended by diplomats of Communist countries, representatives of leftist guerrilla insurgencies, exiled leaders from Chile and Grenada, and fellow traveller foot soldiers. Rev. William Sloane Coffin addressed the mourners saying, "Sandy may not have believed in God, but God believed in Sandy."

== Publications ==
"Reaganomics: Cornerstone of US Aggression." 1985. conference presentation: Movimiento Cubano por la Paz y la Soberanía de los Pueblos.

US Peace Council Fundraising Letter. 1985.

"Reagan vs. Reality in Central America." New World Review. July August 1983.

"Quagmire in Central America." Political Affairs. May 1982.
