= Pacific Rim Mining Corporation =

Mining company based in Vancouver Canada

The Pacific Rim Mining Corporation is a multinational mining company headquartered in Vancouver, Canada. Its principal corporate offices are located in Reno, Nevada and has operations throughout the Americas. It merged with Dayton Mining Corporation in 2002. In 2013, Pacific Rim became a wholly owned subsidiary of OceanaGold.

== Projects ==
As the company's projects were still in development, Pacific Rim had no income in 2009. At the end of 2009, the company's total assets were valued at $8.2 million.

== El Dorado mine in El Salvador ==
The proposed El Dorado mine project is Pacific Rim's largest project. The company gained the mine property, of 144 square kilometres, from its merger with Dayton Mining Corporation in 2002, and claims to have invested approximately $77 million to discover and prepare to begin mining gold deposits in Cabañas department. The company estimates that it can extract 1.4 million gold-equivalent troy ounces.

=== Controversy ===
According to US think tank Public Citizen Pacific Rim did not complete a feasibility study required for a mining permit, and in July 2008 ceased exploratory drilling. Expatriate Salvadorans and local activists connected with the Farabundo Marti National Liberation Front (FMLN) political party campaigned for the project to be discontinued over human rights issues, and concerns of pollution arising from the extraction of gold and silver. As of December 2008, 24 mining projects were waiting for new mining laws introduced by the National Coalition Party (PCN) to be finalized. However, environmentalists warned of negative environmental and social impacts if mining went ahead. On June 16, 2009, FMLN lawmakers demanded a permanent ban on gold and silver mining in El Salvador, whose requirements meant that "companies involved in mining activities in El Salvador would have 180 days to abort operations and leave the country." However, the proposal did not become law.

Pacific Rim claimed that the mine would be environmentally responsible, provide jobs and spur economic development. The company also claimed that dewatering activities in the mine would produce substantial amounts of water, and that it would collect runoff rain water. However, some organizations and the Salvadorian government questioned these claims.

==== Deaths ====
In 2008, tensions in Cabañas rose as three prominent anti-mining activists were murdered. In June 2009—after the murder of a local pro-mining businessman, Horacio Menjivar, two months earlier—environmental campaigner Marcelo Rivera Moreno was kidnapped, tortured and murdered. In August, Menjivar's son, Oscar, was arrested for the attempted murder of another anti-mining activist, Ramiro Rivera Gomez (no relation to Marcelo Rivera Moreno). In October, Esperanza Menjivar, the widow of Horacio and mother of Oscar, was murdered. On December 20, 2009, Ramiro Rivera Gomez was murdered, followed by another anti-mining activist, Dora Alicia Recinos Sorto, on December 26. Recinos Sorto was eight months pregnant when she was shot dead, and her two-year-old son was also wounded in the attack.

Many Salvadoran anti-mining activists suggested the murders were connected to Pacific Rim. Robin Broad and John Cavanagh, authors of The Water Defenders: How Ordinary People Saved a Country from Corporate Greed, wrote that in 2008-2009 Pac Rim was anxious to make alliances with politicians in El Salvador. Rodrigo Chavez Palacios, son of a former presidential candidate, was hired as vice president of Pacific Rim El Salvador, the local subsidiary of Pacific Rim Mining Corporation. Rodrigo Chavez Palacios was later arrested in 2014 for participating in the murder of Franklin Ortiz Mendoza and was released on parole in December 2020. According to Broad and Cavanagh, Marcelo Rivera’s brother, fellow activist Miguel Rivera, formally requested the attorney general to investigate Palacios as potentially involved in Marcelo’s murder, but no investigation was launched.

Local police and other investigators believed that they were connected to a series of murders (six in total) between two neighborhood groups.

In June 2010, Pacific Rim CEO Thomas Shrake testified before the Canadian parliament's Standing Committee on Foreign Affairs and International Development, stating that suggestions that the company had been involved in the murder of anti-mining activists were "simply outrageous" and that they would be "contrary to everything we believe and practice." He also noted that the mine operation and employees had been victims of attacks, including "mobs" that damaged their property and hacked down trees planted as part of the company's reforestation program.

=== International arbitration ===
In response to President Antonio Saca's refusal to allow a mining permit, Pacific Rim Mining Corp. invoked a provision of the Central American Free Trade Agreement (CAFTA) in 2009 to place the matter in the hands of an international arbitration court. As Canada is not a party to CAFTA, the company declared ad hoc a subsidiary in Nevada as the base for the claim. The company sought over $300 million in damages, asserting that the government "changed the rules of the game" laid out in the nation's mining laws.

When Pacific Rim invoked the CAFTA international arbitration provision in 2009, initially seeking $77 million in damages, the Salvadoran government called the action "an attack" on its national sovereignty. Other gold mining companies with operations in Central America, such as Goldcorp, said they may use the Pacific Rim case to adjudicate disputes of their own. In October 2012, Pacific Rim signed a deal with Crowell & Moring to represent their case in the final phase of arbitration, which was being handled by the International Centre for Settlement of Investment Disputes (ICSID).

In October 2016, the ICSID dismissed Pacific Rim's claim for an eventual amount of $250 million, ruling that their case was "without merit." Pacific Rim was also ordered to pay the Salvadoran government $8 million in legal fees.
