= Committee in Solidarity with the People of El Salvador =

US non-profit organization

- Abbreviation: CISPES
- Formation: 1980
- Type: Non-profit NGO
- Purpose: Supporting the Salvadoran people’s struggle for self-determination and social and economic justice
- Headquarters: Washington, D.C.
- Region served: United States and El Salvador
- Official language: English and Spanish
- Director: Alexis Stoumbelis

The Committee in Solidarity with the People of El Salvador, based in Washington, D.C., is a national activist organization with chapters in various cities in the United States. CISPES supports the Farabundo Martí National Liberation Front (FMLN) and the progressive social movement in El Salvador.

CISPES was founded in October 1980 by conventions in Los Angeles and Washington, D.C. in opposition to the U.S. aid (funding and political support) to the Salvadoran military and government during the Salvadoran civil war. CISPES opposed the politics and the actions of the right-wing Nationalist Republican Alliance (ARENA) and its leader Roberto D'Aubuisson during the Salvadoran Civil War, and continues to oppose the policies that ARENA implements.

Since the end of El Salvador's civil war in 1992, CISPES has worked with the FMLN and with Salvadoran popular movement organizations (unions, women's groups, peasants groups, etc.) in opposition to economic policies of free trade and privatization such as the Central American Free Trade Agreement (CAFTA). CISPES organizes delegations to visit with El Salvador's left wing activists as well as organizing delegations to monitor Salvadoran elections for potential fraud or political manipulation.

== FBI investigations ==
Responsible for the distribution and dissemination of a Soviet forged State Department paper Dissent Paper on El Salvador and Central America, CISPES was a target of two FBI investigations during the 1980s.

From August to December 1981 the FBI conducted a 3-month inquiry (something less than an investigation) into whether CISPES was merely a front organization for the Salvadoran rebel groups, thereby placing the organization in violation of the Foreign Agents Registration Act (FARA).

The organization that had grown to over 300 regional chapters in one year, came under DOJ and FBI scrutiny based on the alleged travel diary of Farid Handal, brother of Salvadoran Communist Party leader Schafik Hándal, that supposedly had been seized by the Salvadoran National Guard during raids on Salvadoran rebel safehouses and handed over to the CIA. A story about the diary made its way into a John Birch Society publication Review of the News and a Republican House of Representative staffer passed a copy on to the FBI. The diary was said to outline Farid's visit to the US and his meetings with Sandy Pollack, representing both the U.S. Peace Council (USPC, the national chapter of the then Soviet directed World Peace Council) and the Communist Party USA (CPUSA), and with others, with the expressed and sole purpose of creating a solidarity network in the US for the Salvadoran rebels.

Only a few months after Handal's trip in May 1980, during which he did meet with Pollack, according to her biography published by the US Peace Council, CISPES came into being by way of two founding conferences in which various Salvadoran rebels participated. Members in the Los Angeles chapter, for example, claimed that they had been informally working together for a year before the founding conference in October.[16] Pollack was a founding member of the CISPES national council and served as such until her death in 1985. But, in the end, the FBI could not authenticate the diary and found no other verifiable evidence to prove direct control of CISPES by a foreign entity or to warrant further investigation. The case was dropped pending any further developments.

By March 1983, the FBI had received what it considered to be sufficient information to open a full investigation into whether CISPES was providing financial and other types of aid in support of FMLN and FDR terrorist activities. The initial scope of the investigation was focused on CISPES leadership and especially its DC headquarters and Dallas chapter. But in late 1983 a directive was sent to all FBI field offices initiating a nationwide investigation that engulfed all members of 180 CISPES chapters as well as nearly 200 other groups that had the slightest connection to CISPES. The new investigation hinged mostly on information supplied by an informant, Frank Varelli, who the FBI later admitted had not been properly vetted and should never have been taken seriously. The investigation was closed in 1985. Later inquiries into the mishandling of the investigation by Congress led to disciplinary action against 6 FBI personnel, the resignation of the FBI officer responsible for handling Varelli [22], and many FBI policy and procedural changes.

Security classified computerized records related to the investigation are in the U.S National Archives. FBI documents on both the New Orleans and the National CISPES office in Washington D.C., obtained via the Freedom of Information Act, are archived at Loyola University New Orleans.

== See also ==
- Operation Condor
- Jennifer Casolo
- Lori Berenson
- Wisconsin Coordinating Council on Nicaragua
