= OceanaGold =

Gold mining company

OceanaGold Corporation
- Type: Public
- Traded as: TSX: OGCNYSE: OGC
- Industry: Gold mining
- Founded: 1989
- Headquarters: Vancouver, British Columbia, Canada
- Key people: Gerard Bond, President & CEO
- Revenue: ▲US$1.893 billion (2025)
- Operating income: ▲US$777.5 million (2025)
- Net income: ▲US$628.7million (2025)
- Number of employees: 3,700
- Website: www.oceanagold.com

OceanaGold Corporation (OceanaGold), previously named Macraes Mining Company and then GRD Macraes, is a gold mining and exploration company based in Vancouver, Canada and Brisbane, Australia.

OceanaGold operates the Haile Gold Mine in the United States, the Didipio Mine in the Philippines, and the Macraes and Martha Mines in New Zealand. It is publicly listed on the Toronto Stock Exchange under the ticker "OGC" and was formerly listed on the Australian Securities Exchange.

== History ==
OceanaGold was founded in 1989 in New Zealand, then known as the Macraes Mining Company Ltd. The company commenced gold production at Macraes in 1990. The company became GRD Macraes Ltd in 1998 through a takeover of Macraes by Perth-based GRD, with business journalist Brian Gaynor describing the merger as "one of the worst cases of company looting since the 1980s". GRD had been under financial pressure in 1998 and the takeover gave it access to the cashflow of the New Zealand company.

In December 2003, the Perth-based parent company launched a share issue for a new New Zealand-based company to be called Oceana Gold, with the aim of raising NZ$114 million and half the income going to GRD Macraes in exchange for the New Zealand assets. Oceana Gold listed on both the Australian and New Zealand stock exchanges in mid-March 2004. GRD Macraes sold its remaining shareholding in OceanaGold during 2006.

== Operations ==
=== New Zealand ===
The Macraes Operation, located on the South Island of New Zealand, is the country’s largest gold producing operation. The wholly owned Macraes Operation includes the Coronation, Coronation North, Innes Mills, Deepdell North, Deepdell South, Golden Point, Northwest Pit, Round Hill, Southern Pits, Innes Mills, Innes Mills West, Gay Tan and Frasers open pits, Frasers and Golden Point underground mines, and an adjacent processing plant including a pressure oxidation plant for the processing of sulphide ore. The Macraes Operation has been mining and processing gold bearing ore since 1990 and has produced over 5 million ounces. In November 2025, The Otago Regional Council extended the company's Macraes gold mining consent for another five years.

The Waihi Operation is located on the North Island of New Zealand and was acquired by OceanaGold from Newmont Mining Corporation (Newmont) in 2015. The mine comprises two areas of mineralisation which are at different stages of development, being underground and open pit mining. It consists of two mining operations in Waihi and the Martha underground mine. On 18 December, Oceana Gold's proposed Waihi North extension became the first mining project to gain approval under the New Zealand Government's Fast-track Approvals Act 2024's regime.

=== Philippines ===
In 2006, OceanaGold acquired the Didipio Gold-Copper Project in the Philippines through a merger with Climax Mining Limited. Didipio is in the north of Luzon Island, approximately 270 kilometres northeast of the capital Manila. The Financial and Technical Assistance Agreement (FTAA) currently covers approximately 8.621.38 km2 (as confirmed by the MGB in their letter dated 7 September 2022) located in the provinces of Nueva Vizcaya and Quirino. The nearest significant towns to the Didipio Mine are Cabarroguis, located approximately 20 kilometres to the north, and Kasibu to the west. The main road access to Didipio is via a concrete sealed road to Dibibi in Cabarroguis, and from Dibibi there is a 22-kilometre all-weather concrete-gravel road to the mine site. A secondary access connects Didipio by an all-weather gravel road to Kasibu, which is in turn connected by concrete road to the Pan-Philippine Highway at Bambang, Nueva Vizcaya.

In March 2023, OceanaGold announced that it will invest up to $50,000,000 to boost outputs and expand its operations in Nueva Vizcaya.

=== United States ===
The Haile Gold Mine is wholly owned and operated by OceanaGold. Haile is located three miles northeast of the town of Kershaw in southern Lancaster County, South Carolina. Lancaster County lies in the north-central part of the state. The Haile property site is approximately 17 miles southeast of the city of Lancaster, the county seat, which is approximately 30 miles south of Charlotte, North Carolina. It is also approximately 50 miles northeast of Columbia, South Carolina. Geologically, Haile is situated in the Carolina terrane, which also hosts the past-producing Ridgeway and Brewer Gold Mines. The Carolina terrane was the location of the first gold rush in the United States in the early 1800s.

In 2022, OceanaGold secured the final permits to expand its Haile mining operations in Kershaw.

== Closed sites ==
=== El Salvador ===
OceanaGold acquired the El Dorado Project in El Salvador in late 2013 through the acquisition of Pacific Rim Mining Corporation. El Dorado operated as an underground mine from 1948 to 1953. At the time of its purchase by OceanaGold and today, El Dorado has been an exploration project and has not been an operating mine since 1953. OceanaGold has closed the El Dorado project and does not plan future investments in El Salvador.

In 2016, a World Bank tribunal dismissed a compensation claim filed by OceanaGold demanding the government of El Salvador to pay $250 million in compensation to the company for failing to issue permits to mine gold in the country. OceanaGold was further ordered to pay $8 million to cover the legal costs of the claim, which was first filed by Pacific Rim Mining in 2009.

=== New Zealand ===
The mine at Reefton on the West Coast of the South Island opened in 2007. It closed in 2016. The Reefton Restoration Project is a comprehensive closure and rehabilitation program currently underway at the site. Rehabilitation works to date have included ground preparation, including waste rock reshaping, backfilling operations and seedling coverage.

== Carbon footprint ==
OceanaGold reported total direct and indirect carbon dioxide equivalent (CO2e) emission for 31 December 2020 at 232 Kt (−16 /-6.6% y-o-y). There is little evidence of a consistent declining trend as of yet.

OceanaGold's Total CO2e emissions (Direct + Indirect) (in kilotonnes)
Dec 2015	Dec 2016	Dec 2017	Dec 2018	Dec 2019	Dec 2020
206	219	243	246	248	232

== Didipio mine controversy ==
=== Alleged demolition of houses ===
In June 2008, OceanaGold was accused of illegally demolishing at least 187 houses in Didipio, Kasibu, Nueva Vizcaya during the construction of the Didipio mine. According to a report by the Commission on Human Rights of the Philippines (CHR), the houses were "bulldozed off cliffs and set on fire". One resident, Emilio Pumihic, was shot by OceanaGold's security personnel when he tried to stop the demolition crews from dismantling the house of his neighbor Manuel Bidang, who was still asleep inside. Although officers of the Philippine National Police were present during the demolition, the shooter was not apprehended.

In January 2011, the CHR issued Resolution No. A2011-004 denouncing the "alarming human rights situation in Barangay Didipio, Kasibu, Nueva Vizcaya" after receiving and verifying complaints from its mostly indigenous residents. The commission found OceanaGold had committed several human rights violations against the Didipio residents and resolved unanimously to recommend the probable withdrawal of the FTAA grant to OceanaGold, effectively preventing their operation within the country. No official action was taken by the Philippine government and OceanaGold completed the construction of the mine in 2013.

=== Conflicts with local government and blockade ===
OceanaGold's initial 25-year FTAA with the Philippine government lapsed on 20 June 2019. Nueva Vizcaya governor Carlos Padilla issued an executive ordering the provincial government, the municipal government of Kasibu, the local government of Didipio and the local police to stop any mining activities by OceanaGold. The company filed a plea of injunction with the Bayombong Regional Trial Court to challenge the order, but was denied. Padilla further warned OceanaGold that they would face court charges for allegedly continuing mining activities despite the expiration of their FTAA. Nueva Vizcaya's provincial council also passed a local resolution officially opposing the renewal of the company's FTAA. To enforce this resolution, the government of Nueva Vizcaya placed checkpoints augmented by blockades occupied by local residents along the mine's access roads, effectively preventing the mine from operating.

In January 2020, President Rodrigo Duterte authorized the delivery of 63,000 liters of fuel to the Didipio mine. On 6 April 2020, more than 100 police officers armed with riot gear escorted three diesel tankers owned by OceanaGold and forcibly dispersed the barricade set up by Didipio residents. One person was arrested and charged with violating quarantine protocols and civil disobedience. According to a CHR statement, several residents were injured in the dispersal, most of whom were indigenous women. The incident prompted a statement from the Office of the United Nations High Commissioner for Human Rights denouncing the "unnecessary and disproportionate" use of force and urged the company to stop its operations, beyond maintaining a water pump, until indigenous and local communities have been consulted and have consented.

In response, OceanaGold released its own statement explaining that they sought the necessary permits from the national and local government to conduct an "emergency fuel delivery" to maintain the operation of a water pump preventing the underground mine from flooding. The company maintains that they "did not participate in the fuel delivery" and that they are "not a party to any judicial action relating to the protest". OceanaGold also claims that only a "small number of local people" oppose their operations and that the majority of the community support the renewal of their FTAA.

On 15 July 2021, President Duterte approved the renewal of OceanGold's FTAA, allowing the company to fully operate once again. The Didipio mine has resumed mineral processing of gold and copper in November 2021, and has returned to full production as of 2023.

=== Legal issue ===
On 22 April 2024, Jose Elmer Mangalinao, Pastor Romualdo Robles, Didipio Earth-Savers’ Multi-Purpose Association Inc. and concerned Nueva Vizcaya residents, joined by provincial government and other organizations, filed a 400-page certiorari and mandamus case before the Bayombong Regional Trial Court to nullify OceanaGold's 2021 renewal of the Financial or Technical Assistance Agreement agreement. The group petitioned for OceanaGold's mining concession closure in Kasibu, Nueva Vizcaya. The "Office of the President’s renewal of the FTAA without prior consultation and Sanggunian endorsement constitutes grave abuse of discretion” Bishop Mangalinao alleged in the judicial review. The petitioners anchored their plea on Sections 26 and 27 of the Local Government Code, Presidential Decree 1151, Presidential Decree 1586, and the Philippine Mining Act requirements of Environmental Clearance Certificate and Environmental Impact Statement. The Nueva Vizcaya provincial government’s Environment Code, Ordinance 2014-108 prohibits the open-pit mining the Didipio Mine in Kasibu.

== See also ==
- Gold as an investment
- Otago gold rush
