= Clitic doubling =

Phenomenon where clitic pronouns appear together with the noun phrases that they refer to

In linguistics, clitic doubling, or pronominal reduplication is the phenomenon where the same entity is represented twice in the same clause; first by a clitic pronoun and then by a whole phrase. This differs from other coreferential expressions due to the lack of a prosodic break.

Clitic doubling is found in many languages, especially the Romance and Balkan languages, and some languages in Northern Philippines, among others.

The conditions on clitic doubling vary from language to language, generally depending on well-known properties of the objects along the animacy hierarchy (allowing, requiring, or forbidding clitic-doubling for different kinds of objects). In this regard, clitic doubling for objects can be viewed as a species of differential object marking.

== Spanish ==
Spanish is one well-known example of a clitic-doubling language, having clitic doubling for both direct and indirect objects. Because standard Spanish grammatical structure does not draw a clear distinction between an indirect object and a direct object referring to a person or another animate entity (see Spanish prepositions), it is common but not compulsory to use clitic doubling to clarify. Compare:

Conocí a Juan. "I met Juan." (Direct object: a Juan)
Di un regalo a Juan. "I gave a gift to Juan." (Direct object: un regalo; indirect object: a Juan)

In such constructions, the indirect object can be expressed both as a full noun phrase and as a clitic in order to note that the noun phrase beginning with a (to) should be understood as an indirect object. When an object, direct or indirect, precedes the verb, clitic doubling is grammatically required.

Di un regalo a mi madre.
{I gave} a gift to my mother
"I gave my mother a gift."

A mi madre le di un regalo.
To my mother {to her} {I gave} a gift
"I gave my mother a gift."

El regalo se lo di a mi madre.
The gift {to her} {it} {I gave} to my mother
"I gave my mother the gift."

A mis invitados siempre les ofrezco café.
To my guests always {to them} {I offer} coffee
"I always offer coffee to my guests."

No les des comida a los animales.
Not {to them} give food to the animals
"Do not give food to the animals."

This usage is highly preferred for many verbs, but for some verbs it is not compulsory, and it would also be valid to say: "Siempre ofrezco café a mis invitados", without clitic doubling.

Similarly, the direct object may also be doubled, with both the direct object pronoun and the full noun phrase, but this is not as common as indirect clitic doubling and is usually influenced by definiteness, animacy, and specificity.

(Lo) vi a tu papá en la tienda. "I saw your dad at the store."
El otro día (la) conocí a su esposa. "The other day I met his wife."

One particular use is to clarify emphatic structures by moving the object to the beginning of the frase, whereby clitic doubling becomes mandatory (it is also mandatory when a personal pronoun is the indirect object, introduced by a):

Ese regalo se lo di a él. "I gave him that gift."

== Italian ==
In Italian, clitic doubling can be used for emphasis, is often viewed as a colloquial pleonasm, and is considered "incorrect" by some prescriptive grammarians.

Example: a me mi pare di sì ("I [personally, for what I am concerned] think so")

Despite what prescriptive grammars hold, clitic doubling is not only correct, but also mandatory in some contexts.

Example: a me non mi ha chiamato ("for what I am concerned, he has not called me").

The latter contrasts with *a me non ha chiamato, which is not a possible sentence.

== Iloko ==
In Iloko, a third person pronoun must co-occur with the full noun phrase to which it refers when 1) the noun phrase is the agent of a transitive verb and a pronoun is the patient, or when 2) the noun phrase is the possessor and a pronoun is the thing possessed. The appropriate fused personal pronoun is used and the number of its third person component must agree with the noun phrase.

Examples:

Nakita ni Maria ni Juan.
Maria saw Juan.

Nakitana ni Juan.
She saw Juan.

BUT...
Nakitanaka ni Maria.
Maria saw you.
NOT *Nakitaka ni Maria.

Na-kita -naka ni Maria
PERF.ABIL-"see" 3S.ERG+2S.ABS ART PR
saw she=you {} Maria
'Maria saw you.'

NOT: *Nakitaak ni Maria.

Na-kita -data da Maria ken ni Juan
PERF.ABIL-"see" 3P.ERG+1D.ABS ART PR CONJ ART PR
saw {they=(two of) us} {} Maria and {} John
'Maria and John saw (the two of) us.'

NOT: *Nakitaak da Maria ken ni Juan.

Anak -daka dagiti {ag- Rizal}
"child" 3P.ERG+2S.ABS ART {KIN PR}
child their=you the Rizal's
'You are the Rizals' child.'

NOT: *Anakka dagiti Rizal.

== Lombard ==
In Lombard, clitics are widely used with both nouns and pronouns.

Te gh' el diset ti {a la Rina} che l' è staa luu?
You {to her} it {(you) tell} you {to Rina} that it has been he?
Will you tell OR Would you mind telling Rina it was him [who did it]?

== Venetian ==
In Venetian, clitics usually double the second singular person subject and third singular and plural subject.

The above, if literally translated into English, would be redundant:

I mii i vien doman
{The (parents)} mine they come tomorrow
'My parents come tomorrow'

Marco el Vien doman
Marco he comes tomorrow
'Marco comes tomorrow'

Ti te/ti/tu vien doman
You you come tomorrow
'You come tomorrow'

Interrogative subjects clitics double also other subjects. They attach to the verb:

Cantè-o anca voaltri/e?
Sing-you also {you (PL.M/F)}
'Do you (pl.) sing as well?'

Accusative clitics double first and second singular/plural direct object

Te go visto ti
you {(I) have} seen you

In some varieties of the language, also dative clitics may double and indirect object, even of third person:

Marco el ghe ga dà un libro a Toni
Mark he {to him} has given a book to Tony

== Macedonian and Bulgarian ==
In the standard Macedonian language, clitic doubling is obligatory with definite direct and indirect objects, which contrasts with standard Bulgarian where clitic doubling is optional. Non-standard dialects of Macedonian and Bulgarian have differing rules regarding clitic doubling.

== Arabic ==
Clitic doubling is found in Levantine dialects of Arabic, such as Lebanese Arabic:

قلتلها لإمي (iltilla la-immi) "I told my mother". Literally: I-said-to-her to-my-mother.

The indirect-object suffix is appended to the verb and the noun additionally takes a clitic.

كتابه لجوزي (ktābu la-jawzi) "my husband's book". Literally: his-book of-my-husband.

The possessive suffix is appended to the possessed noun and the possessor is additionally indicated with a clitic.

Similar patterns are found in Maltese, where, however, they might also be due to Romance influence.

== Degema ==
Clitic doubling occurs in Degema, as it does in Romance and Slavic languages. However, clitic doubling in Degema is not associated with the presence of a preposition as in Romance languages like Spanish nor is it associated with topicality or specificity as in Slavic languages like Bulgarian. Rather, what makes clitic doubling in Degema possible are syntactic (movement and anaphoricity) and discourse (emphasis and/or familiarity) factors (Kari 2003) Consider (1) below:

Eni mo=sire
elephant CL=run
'An elephant is running'

In (1) the subject noun phrase (NP) 'Eni' is doubled by the clitic 'mo='. The clitic agrees in person, number and case with the doubled subject NP.

Example (2) shows that specific and non-specific subjects in Degema can be doubled by a clitic:

Eni mo=rere
elephant CL=walk
'An elephant is walking'

Eni mee mo=rere
elephant my CL=walk
'My elephant is walking'

Example (3) shows that both topicalized and non-topicalized NPs in Degema can be doubled by a clitic:

Okper o=kun esen
Otter CL=catch.factative fish
'An Otter caught a fish'

Okper nu o=kun esen
Otter FOC CL=catch.factative fish
'It was an Otter that caught a fish'

In Degema, the preposition does not feature in clitic doubling constructions in particular and in cliticization in general. Although there are object NPs such as indirect object NPs that can cooccur with a preposition, there are no corresponding object clitics to double them, unlike subject NPs.

Kari (2003: 135f) adds that "syntactic factors are stronger than discourse factors in the licensing of clitic doubling in Degema. Discourse factors only ensure the expression or suppression of the doubled NP after syntactic operations have taken place".

== See also ==
- Resumptive pronoun
