= Ilocano verbs =

Action words in the Philippine language

While other word categories in Ilocano are not as diverse in forms, verbs are morphologically complex inflecting chiefly for aspect. Ilocano verbs can also be cast in any one of five foci or triggers. In turn, these foci can inflect for different grammatical moods.

== Reduplication ==
An important aspect of Ilokano verbal morphology is reduplication. Reduplication in verbal paradigms consists of repeating the first /(C_{1})V(C_{2}).../ sequence of phonemes of the root as required by the form resulting in a bimoraic or heavy syllable. Or, the first /(C)V/ is repeated as is the case for indicating plural actors.

Basic form: gatang buy
Reduplicated form: gatgatang

Basic form: aramat use
Reduplicated form: ar-aramat[1]

The glottal stop as the second consonant of the sequence (C_{2}) is lost. Two strategies can be applied to maintain the weight of the reduplicated syllable. Either the vowel (V) is lengthened (compensatory lengthening) or the first consonant (C_{1}) is doubled (geminated).

Basic form: sao [sa.ʔo] say
Reduplicated form: sasao [saː.sa.ʔo]
or
sassao [sas.sa.ʔo]

Basic form: dait [da.ʔit] sew
Reduplicated form: dadait [daː.da.ʔit]
or
daddait [dad.daː.ʔit]

== Aspect ==
Due to having Austronesian alignment, Ilocano verbs chiefly inflect for aspect, and not for tense.

=== Inflectional Pattern ===
Verbs inflect for the following:

- Neutral - The neutral form is not marked for aspect (perfective or imperfective) or initiation (initiated or non-initiated) nor tense (past or non-past). It serves as the form for both the infinitive and the imperative.
- Perfective - A completed action or accomplished state.
- Imperfective - A non-punctual, repeated or habitual action or continued state.
- Past Imperfective - A non-punctual, repeated or habitual action occurring in the past or a state that continued in the past.

In the typical verbal paradigm, Neutral and Perfective forms are not reduplicated, whereas the Imperfective and the Past Imperfective are reduplicated. The Imperfective and the Past Imperfective are marked for initiation.

Conjugation Pattern
	Non-Initiated	Initiated
Simple	Neutral	Perfective
Reduplicated	Imperfective	Past Imperfective

In a typical paradigm the chart would appear as the following:

Conjugation Pattern
	Non-Initiated	Initiated
Simple	[AFFIX]	[AFFIX+N]
Reduplicated	[AFFIX]+[CVC]	[AFFIX+N]+[CVC]

[AFFIX] is the verbal affix. [AFFIX+N] is the verbal affix modified for initiation. In many of the paradigms, the mark of initiation is N, for example, nag-, na-, and -in-. [CVC] is the reduplicated syllable of the root.

=== Future ===
The future is not encoded with a particular verbal form. It is shown by affixing the enclitic -(n)to to the neutral form of the verb. The enclitic is not very cohesive. When it attaches, the personal pronoun enclitics intervene. If the preceding morpheme ends in a vowel, the form is -nto, otherwise, -to.

Examples:

Kitaen to see (something)
kita[Root: see] + en[Patient Focus]

Kitaento to about to see (something)
kita[Root: see] + en[Patient Focus] + to[Fut. Part.]

Kitaennanto He/she will see (something)
kita[Root: see] + en[Patient Focus] + na[3rd Person Singular Ergative] + nto[Fut. Part.]

Kitaendakto They will see me
kita[Root: see] + en[Patient Focus] + dak[3rd Per. Plu. Erg./1st Per. Sing.] + to[Fut. Part.]

== Focus ==
Ilocano, like other Philippine languages, has an Austronesian morphosyntactic alignment. The verb is capable of tracking (focusing) on particular noun phrases within the sentence. Ilokano verbs are capable of focusing on noun phrases with the following thematic roles: Agent, Patient, Commitative, Directional, Benefactive, Thematic and Instrumental.

The Agent focus requires only one noun phrase. According to Galvino (2000), the affixes in the Agent focus are Intransitive, because the verb form does not require another noun phrase to complete its meaning. The noun phrase is the agent or the experiencer of the action.

The remaining foci, Patient, Commitative, Directional, Benefactive, Thematic and Instrumental require the presence of two theta roles: the agent noun phrase and the focused noun phrase. Galvino (2000) terms these as Transitive.

Potentially, all roots can be cast into all of the foci. Due to the semantics of the root, however, not many do in practice. Roots can differ in meaning when cast into different foci. The difference can be a slight nuance to almost opposite in meaning. For example, if the root dalus clean is cast in the Patient focus, the resulting meaning is to clean (something). But, if cast in the Directional focus, the resulting meaning is to clean (something) off, the focused noun phrase becomes the area affected instead of the object affected.

Foci and Corresponding Affixes
Focus	Conjugation	Example	Gloss
Agent	<um>	gumatang	to buy
Agent	ag-	aggatang	to buy (again and again), to shop
Agent	mang-	manggatang	to buy
Agent	ma-	maturog	to sleep
Patient	-en	dalusen	to clean (something)
Commitative	ka-	kasao	to talk with (someone)
Locative	-an	dalusan	to clean (something) off
Thematic	i-	iruar	to put (something) outside
Benefactive	i> <an	igatangan	to buy for someone
Instrumental	pag-	pagdalus	to use something to clean

=== Agent Focus ===
Verbs cast in this focus throw emphasis on the noun phrase with the agent or experiencer role in the sentence. Impersonal verbs and verbs describing natural phenomenon occur with this focus, for example Agar-arbis It is drizzling.

Noun phrases in the agent role are introduced by the core forms of the articles, ti for common nouns and ni for personal nouns. The enclitic absolutive (-ak series) of personal pronouns replace these noun phrases. If the verb can take a direct object, it is marked by the oblique forms of the articles, deictives and pronouns, for example, Nangan iti saba He ate a banana. Notice how the direct object is indefinite.

Patient role noun phrases (direct objects) of verbs are introduced by the oblique forms. In addition, Patients of verbs cast in the agent focus are indefinite.

There are four affixes in this focus category: ag-, -um-, mang- and ma-. Roots will prefer to take only one or some of the prefixes. In some cases the meaning changes from one affix to another, for example, ngisit, black. If ag- is affixed, agngisit, the meaning is that of there is a likelihood of becoming black or to darken, for example Nagngisitka, You darkened. However, with -um-, ngumisit, the meaning becomes more of a possibility or conjecture, Ngumisngisitkansa iti tengnat' aldaw, You might get darker at midday.

==== Ag- ====
The verbal prefix ag- is very productive and can verbalize a large number of roots. If a new word were to enter the language, most likely this is the prefix used to verbalize it, for example, the fictitious baz: agbaz to "baz".

If the root takes either ag- or -um-, the additional meaning of ag- are some of the following:

- Repetition of the action
- Long duration of the action
- With some roots, the attainment of the root, for example, dakkel, big, agdakkel to be big, doktor doctor, agdoktor to be a doctor.
- The actor is in full control (internally motivated)
- The certainty of the action because it is habitually occurring or frequently occurring.
- Denotes the action taken on with the root, palsiit blowgun, agpalsiit to shoot with the blowgun, use the blowgun. (Compare with -um- below.)

Ag-
Aspect	Form	Example	Gloss
Neutral	ag-	agtaray	to run
Continuous Progressive	agCVC-	agtartaray	is/was running
Perfective	nag-	nagtaray	ran has/have run
Continuous Complete	nagCVC-	nagtartaray	was/were running used to run would run

==== <um> ====
The verbal prefix <um>, is inserted, or infixed, to the first syllable of the root.

Some of the meanings imparted using this infix are:

- A single action or an action that is not as long in duration as what is denoted by ag-.
- With certain roots, using <um> denotes the act of "becoming" the root, for example, lakay old man, lumakay to grow older, to become older (said of males), to become an old man.
- The actor is externally or circumstantially motivated.
- The possibility of the action. (Compare with ag- above.)

<um>
Aspect	Form	Example	Gloss
Neutral	<um>	gumatang	to buy
Continuous Progressive	C<um>VC~	gumatgatang	buys is/are buying
Perfective	<imm>	gimmatang	bought has/have bought
Continuous Complete	C<imm>VC~	gimmatgatang	is/was buying used to buy would buy

==== Ag- Versus <um> ====
The affixes ag- and <um> are very similar. Many verbs take either and have little difference in meaning. Other verbs are drastically differentiated. Below is a chart contrasting the two.

Ag- Versus <um>
Feature	Ag-	<um>
Repetition	Multiple	At least once, Very few
Duration	Long	Short
Motivation	Internal	External, Circumstantial
Control	Controlled	Not Controlled
Probability	Likely	Conjectured
State	Attained	In progress, Becoming

Examples
Feature	Ag-	<um>	Root
Repetition	aginom, to drink often, drink alcohol	uminom, to drink (water, juice, etc.)	inom, drink
Duration	agtakder, to stand	tumakder, to stand up	takder, upright
Motivation	agkabaw, to be forgetful, go senile	kumabaw, to become senile	kabaw, senile
Control	agsao, to speak	sumao, to speak up, to be heard	sao, word, speech
Probability	agkagat, to bite (likely)	kumagat, to bite (seemingly)	kagat, (a) bite
State	agbaknang, to be rich	bumaknang, to become rich	baknang, riches

==== Mang- ====
The mang- prefix is used to denote the following:

- Collection or gathering
- Purchase
- Movement
- Occupation and identification

The final nasal, /ŋ/, of the prefix commonly becomes the homorganic nasal of the first consonant of the root which disappears or remains.

This affix is used when it is necessary to make a normally transitive verb, a verb that commonly occurs with -en, -an or i-, intransitive for syntactic reasons. These verbs will take mang- in such instances.

Nasal assimilation
Consonant	Nasal	Form	Example Root	Example Form
/p/,/b/,/m/	/m/	mam-	baka, cow	mamaka, to buy cows
/t/,/d/,/s/,/n/	/n/	man-	talon, field	manalon, to work in the field, farmer
/k/, /ɡ/, /ŋ/	/ŋ/	mang-	kayo, wood, tree	mangayo, to collect wood, wood collector
All others	/ŋ/	mang-	ubas, grapes	mangubas, to gather grapes

Mang-
Aspect	Form	Example	Gloss
Neutral	mang-	mangrugi	to start
Continuous Progressive	mangCVC-	mangrugrugi	starts is/are starting
Perfective	nang-	nangrugi	started has/had started
Continuous Complete	nangCVC-	nangrugrugi	was/were starting used to start would start

==== Ma- ====
There are few verbs with active meaning that use this prefix. Some of these are maturog (<turog), to sleep, mapan (<pan), to go, magna (<pagna irregular formation), to walk. Because of the semantics of these roots, they cannot take a direct object.

In the continuous progressive form, the prefix participates in reduplication taking the first consonant as its final, unlike the other verbal prefixes.

Lastly, ma- is similar in form to the ma- potentive. They differ in terms of the series of pronouns they are able to take: ma- (agent) take -ak pronouns; ma- (potentives) take -ko.

Ma-
Aspect	Form	Example	Gloss
Neutral	ma-	maturog	to sleep
Continuous Progressive	maCma-	matmaturog	sleeps is/are sleeping
Perfective	na-	naturog	slept has/have slept
Continuous Complete	naCna-	natnaturog	was/were sleeping used to sleep would sleep

=== Patient Focus: -En ===
Verbs cast in this focus throw emphasis on the patient of the verb, in other words, the direct object. Because of this, the misnomer "passive voice" has been applied to verbs in the patient focus.

Agents (or actors) for verbs cast in the true passive voice can be omitted. The English sentence The car was repaired yesterday is grammatical without the agent of the verb. This cannot be said of verbs in the patient focus. Patient focus verbs require both the agent and the object argument for grammaticality. The sentence Tinarimaan ti mekaniko ti kotse is more grammatical than *Tinarimaan ti kotse which lacks an agent.

Patients of verbs cast into this focus are definite. Both actor and patient are both marked by the core form of the article and deictives. For the pronouns, the ergative forms are used, in other words, the -ko series of pronouns. Since the core forms are used for both actor and patient, they are differentiated only by syntax: the actor follows after the verb as close as possible with the patient thereafter. If pronouns are used for both the actor and patient, a special set of pronouns are used. Consult the table of pronoun sequences for details.

What can be considered the patient of an English verb, may be cast in a different theta role in Ilocano. Take for example, the English phrase The student saved the file. In this phrase, the file is the noun phrase in the patient role (the direct object). In Ilocano, however, the same noun phrase would be cast in the thematic role and the verb in the thematic focus, instead, Indulin ti estudiante ti file because of the semantics of the verb. In the Ilocano mind, the file is being transferred to a safe place.

Use of this affix imparts the following meanings:

- Consumption of the object, e.g. alimon "swallow", alimunen "to swallow (something)"
- Permanent change of state, e.g. patay "death", patayen "to kill"
- Mental processing of the object, e.g. panunot "thought", panunuten "to think (about something), ponder (something)"

-En
Aspect	Form	Example	Gloss
Neutral	-en	basaen	to read something
Continuous Progressive	CVC~ -en	basbasaen	reads something is/are reading something
Perfective	<in>	binasa	read something has/has read something
Continuous Complete	C<in>VC~	binasbasa	was/were reading something used to read something would read something

=== Commitative Focus: Ka- ===
Verbs in the comitative focus denote that the verb action is shared between parties. The focused noun phrase is with whom the agent is partaking the action. Similar to the Instrumental focus below, these behave more like nouns.

Ka-
Aspect	Form	Example	Gloss
Neutral	ka-	katungtung	to converse with someone
Continuous Progressive	kaCVC-	katungtungtung	converses with someone is/are conversingwith someone
Perfective	kina-	kinatungtung	conversed with someone has/have conversed with someone
Continuous Complete	kinaCVC-	kinatungtungtung	was/were conversing with someone

=== Directional Focus: -An ===
The focused noun phrases of directional verbs are treated as places or destinations. When a person is the focus, a notion of direction (either to or from) or an affected party is implied, for example, suratan to write to someone, takawan to rob from someone (compare with tawaken to steal something). In addition, the focused noun phrase is treated as an area that is affected by the verb.

Verbs of cleaning, dalusan, to clean, labaan, to launder, sagadan, to sweep, are in this focus as the focused noun phrases are considered as an area affected. It is possible to use -en with these roots, but notice in the following sentences how the affix alters the focus and meaning: (with -an) Dinalusak ti sala. "I cleaned the living room." versus (with -en) Dinalusko ti rugit ti sala. "I cleaned the dirt in the living room."

Meanings:

- Directionality, movement to or from
- Place or destination
- Area affected
- Cleaning

-An
Aspect	Form	Example	Gloss
Neutral	-an	labaan	to launder something
Continuous Progressive	CVC~ -an	lablabaan	launders something is/are laundering something
Perfective	<in> -an	linabaan	laundered something has/have laundered something
Continuous Complete	C<in>VC~ -an	linablabaan	was/were laundering something used to launder something would launder something

=== Thematic Focus: i- ===
The focused noun phrases of thematic verbs are transferred or whose location or state is affected in some way by the semantics of the root. An analog of this idea of transference, verbs of saying are commonly use this affix. What is said becomes the focused element and is thought of as being transferred from one person to another.

Examples of roots that commonly take this form:

- Transference, conveyance, e.g., dulin safe place, idulin' to save, put away
- Change of non-permanent state, e.g., lukat exposed, ilukat to open; rikep shut, irikep to close, to shut
- Verbs that convey information or ideas - baga declaration, ibaga to declare, say; kuna mention, ikuna to mention

I-
Aspect	Form	Example	Gloss
Neutral	i-	ibaga	to say something
Continuous Progressive	iCVC-	ibagbaga	says something is/are saying something
Perfective	in- im- ing-	imbaga	said something has/have said something
Continuous Complete	inCVC- imCVC- ingCVC-	imbagbaga	was/were saying something used to say something would say something

=== Benefactive Focus: i><an ===
The focused noun phrases of the benefactive verbs are usually persons. The verb is performed on their behalf or for their benefit. In English, this would correspond to the indirect object or prepositional phrases introduced with to, for or because of.

As with non-actor verb forms, the core forms of the article and the deictives, and the ergative, or -ko, forms of the personal pronouns mark the actor. The focus, in this case the benefactor, is marked with the core forms and the absolutive, or -ak forms of the personal pronouns. If there is a direct object, it is marked with the oblique forms, for example, Igatanganto ni nanang ni ading iti sapatos Mother will buy shoes for (my) little sister.

Morphologically, the benefactive focused form is a combination of the prefix 'i-' and the suffix '-an'.

Meanings:

- Benefit of the noun phrase in the absolutive
- Representation

I><An
Aspect	Form	Example	Gloss
Neutral	i><an	igatangan	to buy for someone
Continuous Progressive	iCVC><an	igatgatangan	buys for someone is/are buying for someone
Perfective	in><an im><an ing><an	inggatangan	bought for someone has/have bought for someone
Continuous Complete	inCVC><an imCVC><an ingCVC><an	inggatgatangan	was/were buying for someone would buy for someone used to buy for someone

=== Instrumental Focus: Pag- ===
The basic sense of the instrumental focus is the use of something to accomplish the root's meaning; it is the tool or the means of achieving that end. That something is then cast in the absolutive case. For example, dalus, clean space, pagdalus, to use something to clean with.

Again, the actor is marked with the core forms or ergative, with pronouns (i.e., -ko), and the instrument, with core forms, and absolutive with pronouns, for example, Pagdalusan ni tatang ti drapo Father uses the rag to clean with.

Pag-, behaves more like a verbal noun than a verb and sometimes translates as the implement, the reason or the theme of the root instead. Because of this, formations with this affix are lexicalized, thus becoming a derivational affix in some instances.

Meanings:

- Instrument
- Means

Pag-
Aspect	Form	Example	Gloss
Neutral	pag-	pagdalus	to use something to clean to be used to clean
Continuous Progressive	pagCVC-	pagdaldalus	uses something to clean is/are using something to clean is/are used to clean
Perfective	pinag-	pinagdalus	used something to clean has/have used something to clean was/were used to clean
Continuous Complete	pinagCVC-	pinagdaldalus	was/were using something to clean used to use something for cleaning would use something for cleaning

== Imperative Mood ==
The imperative mood of the verb is used for giving commands or making requests.

The difference between the infinitive use and the imperative use is the accompaniment of a personal pronoun. These are the second person pronouns (singular or plural) and the first person plural inclusive.

Examples:

Manganka Eat. (Second Person Singular)
Idissoyo ditoy Put it down here. (Second Person Plural)
Aginanata bassit Let's rest a while. (First Person Dual)

Imperative verbs do not inflect for aspect. Thus, they are not required to "agree" with the verb of the main clause when they occur in subordinate clauses.

Imbaga ni nanang a manganka Mother told you to eat.

== Potentive Mood ==
The potentive mood of verbs denotes the following regarding the speaker's attitude regarding the event:

- Unintentional - The actor had no intent in committing the action.
- Possible - The actor had intent and was able.
- Circumstantial - The actor was influence by the circumstances at the time.
- Involuntary - The actor had no control over what happened.

=== Intransitive: Maka-, Makapag- and Makai- ===
The prefixes Maka-, Makapag- and Makai- corresponds to the following actor focus prefixes in the indicative mood.

Prefix	Indicative	Potentive	Root
ag-	aggatang, to buy	makagatang, makapaggatang to be able to buy	gatang, purchase
-um-	umuli, to ascend	makauli, to be able to ascend	uli, ascent
mang-	mangayo, to gather wood	makakayo, to be able to gather wood	kayo, wood, tree
ma-	maturog, to sleep	makaturog, to be able to sleep	turog, sleep

==== Maka- ====
Maka- is used with all of the other actors focus verbs except for some verbs that normally take ag-. It denotes the innateness of actor, or other factors such as health or knowledge, that affect one's ability to perform the action. It also denotes inattentiveness in the action if the verb can use either makapag- or maka-.

Aspect	Form	Example	Gloss
Neutral	maka-	makaturog	to be able to sleep to be sleepy
Continuous Progressive	makaCVC-	makaturturog	is/are able to sleep is/are sleepy
Perfective	naka-	nakaturog	was/were able to sleep, had been able to sleep, was/were sleepy
Continuous Complete	nakaCVC-	nakaturturog	was/were being able to sleep was/were becoming sleepy

==== Makapag- ====
This prefix is applied to verbs that normally take ag- in the indicative. Similar to ag-, makapag- denotes internal motivation as a reason, so circumstance and context affect the ability to perform the action. Only nouns that denote humans or human-like animals are used with this prefix.

Aspect	Form	Example	Gloss
Neutral	makapag-	makapagdigos	to be able to bathe
Continuous Progressive	makapagCVC-	makapagdigdigos	is/are able to bathe
Perfective	nakapag-	nakapagdigos	was/were able to bathe
Continuous Complete	nakapagCVC-	nakapagdigdigos	was/were being able to bathe

Digos can also take maka-. But, with makapag-, one's ability to bathe will be determined by the availability of water, of the bathroom, of soap, of time, etc.

==== Makai- ====
The prefix makai- is used with detransitivized verbs that normally use i- as their transitive verb form, for example, ibelleng to throw (something) out versus makaibelleng can throw out, to be able to throw out.

Aspect	Form	Example	Gloss
Neutral	maka-	makaibelleng	to be able to throw away
Continuous Progressive	makaiCVC-	makaibelbelleng	is/are able to throw away
Perfective	nakai-	nakaibelleng	was/were able to throw away
Continuous Complete	nakaiCVC-	nakaibelbelleng	was/were being able to throw away

=== Transitive: Ma- ===
The prefix ma- is used with the patient focused affixes. Unlike the actor focused counterpart, maka-, Ma- does not replace the prefix, but is prefixed to the unaltered form. The only exception is the patient focus, where the suffix -en is dropped.

Prefix	Example	Potentive Form	Root
Patient	kitaen to see (something)	makita to be able to see (something) to happen to see (something) to accidentally see (something)	kita see
Commitative	kasao to talk with (someone)	makasao to be able to talk with (someone) to happen to talk with (someone)	sao speech
Directional	suratan to write to (someone)	masuratan to be able to write to (someone) to happen to write to (someone)	surat writing, letter
Thematic	ibaga to say(something)	maibaga to be able to say (something) to happen to say (something)	baga tell, say
Benefactive	igatangan to buy for (someone)	maigatangan to be able to buy for (someone) to happen to buy for (someone)	gatang purchase
Instrumental	pagdalus to used (something) to clean with	mapagdalus to be able to used (something) to clean with to happen to used (something) to clean with	dalus clean space

Examples:

Saanko nakasao ni maestra idi kalman.
I was not able to talk to teacher yesterday.
Nasuratam ida?
Were you able to write to them?
Maigatanganak ti libro?
Can you buy me a book?
Napagdalusko ti daan a kamisetam.
I happened to use your old shirt for cleaning. (It was an accident. I promise!)

The inflectional forms for ma- potentives follow the same pattern detailed above in the Aspect section. In other words, the first syllable of the root reduplicates, not a part of the word before ma- is prefixed, for example, maibagbaga, is/are able to say (something), not *maib-ibaga.

In the initiated forms, the Continuous Progressive form is prefixed with na-, for example, ibagbaga says (something), maibagbaga is/are able to say (something) and naibagbaga was/were being able to say (something), not *maimbagbaga or *naimbagbaga.

Example: ituding to specify (something)
Aspect	Form	Example	Gloss
Neutral	mai-	maituding	to be able to specify (something)
Continuous Progressive	maiCVC-	maitudtuding	is/are being able to specify (something)
Perfective	nai-	naituding	has/had been able to specify (something)
Continuous Complete	naiCVC-	naitudtuding	was/were being able to specify (something)

== Causative: Pa- ==
Causatives are the verb forms where the agent causes or forces the patient to perform a given action or to become a given state. As a result, all causative verbs forms are transitive, requiring both agent and patient.

The common pattern of formation is: [FOCUS] + pa + [ROOT].

== See also ==
- Ilocano language
- Ilocano grammar
- Languages of the Philippines
- Grammatical mood
- Grammatical aspect
- Grammatical tense
