= Ilocano language =

Austronesian language of the Philippines

Ilocano
- Ilokáno
- Ilóko, Ilúko, Pagsasaó nga Ilokáno
- Native to: Philippines
- Region: Northern Luzon which includes the Ilocos Region, Cordillera Administrative Region and Cagayan Valley, as well as many areas in Central Luzon, and certain parts of Mindanao.
- Ethnicity: Ilocano
- Speakers: L1: 8.7 million (2020); L2: 2 million (2000); Total: 11 million (2022) 3rd most spoken native language in the Philippines
- Language family: Austronesian: Malayo-Polynesian; Philippine; Northern Luzon; Ilocano
- Writing system: Latin (Ilocano alphabet), Ilokano Braille; Historically Kur-itan

Official status
- Official language in: La Union
- Recognised minority language in: Philippines
- Regulated by: Komisyon sa Wikang Filipino

Language codes
- ISO 639-2: ilo
- ISO 639-3: ilo
- Glottolog: ilok1237
- Linguasphere: 31-CBA-a
- Proportion of Iloco (Ilocano) language speakers in the Philippines, highlighting areas with significant Ilocano populations.

An Iloco (Ilocano) speaker from Tuguegarao City, Cagayan, sharing his experience in the United States as a migrant worker.

Iloco (also Ilóko, Ilúko, Ilocáno or Ilokáno; /iːloʊˈkɑːnoʊ/; Iloco: Pagsasaó nga Ilóko) is an Austronesian language primarily spoken in the Philippines by the Ilocano people. It is one of the eight major languages of the Philippines with about 11 million speakers and ranks as the third most widely spoken native language. Iloco serves as a regional lingua franca and second language among Filipinos in Northern Luzon, particularly among the Cordilleran (Igorot) ethnolinguistic groups. It is also spoken in the Cagayan Valley and in the portions of the northern and western areas of Central Luzon, including Tarlac, Nueva Ecija, Zambales, and Aurora.

As an Austronesian language, Iloco or Ilocano shares linguistic ties with other Philippine languages and is related to languages such as Bahasa Indonesia, Malayic languages, Tetum, Paiwan, Malagasy and other Malayo-Polynesian languages.

It is mutually intelligible with several Northern Luzon languages, as it belongs to the same Austronesian subgroup. It shares a higher degree of lexical similarity with the Itneg language, which belongs to the Central Cordilleran subgroup, largely due to historical contact and the exchange of loanwords. However, mutual intelligibility with other Central Cordilleran languages is generally low, even though Ilocano functions as a lingua franca and primary second language among many speakers of these languages.

Iloco is also spoken outside of Luzon, including in Mindoro, Palawan, Mindanao particularlly in Soccsksargen, and internationally in Canada, Hawaii and California in the United States, owing to the extensive Ilocano diaspora in the 19th and 20th centuries. About 85% of the Filipinos in Hawaii are Ilocano speakers and the largest Asian ancestry group in Hawaii. In 2012, it was officially recognized as the provincial language of La Union, underscoring its cultural and linguistic significance.

== Etymology ==
In early history, the Ilocano people referred to themselves as "Samtoy", a term derived from the Iloco phrase sao mi ditoy, meaning "our language here."

The term "Ilocano" originates from the native word "Ilúko" and has undergone linguistic evolution influenced by both indigenous and Spanish elements. It is derived from the Ilocano prefix i-, meaning "of" or "from", combined with luék, luëk, or loóc, which denote "sea" or "bay". This etymology suggests that the language, like the people, was historically associated with coastal settlements, thus signifying "language of the people from the bay".

An alternative linguistic interpretation connects the term to the Ilocano words lúku or lúkung, which refer to flatlands, valleys, or low-lying areas. According to this explanation, "Ilocano" may have originally meant "language of the people of the lowlands," distinguishing it from the languages spoken by mountain-dwelling communities.

During Spanish colonization, the term "Ilocano" was formalized and adapted to Spanish linguistic conventions. The suffix -ano, commonly used in Spanish to denote a group or people (as seen in terms such as Americano or Mexicano), was appended to align with Spanish grammatical structures. This adaptation contributed to the term's official recognition and widespread use in colonial records and classifications.

== Classification ==
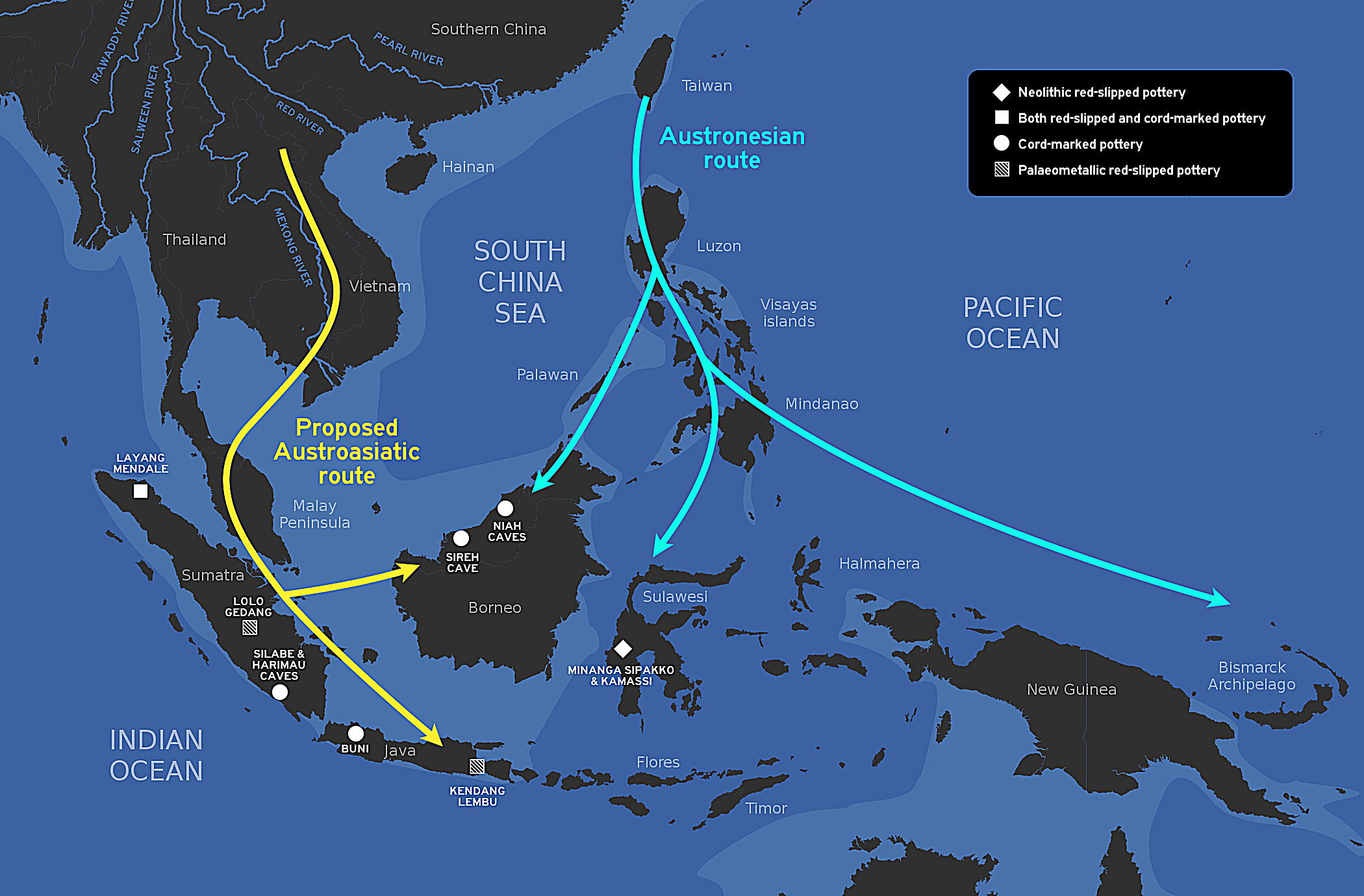
Map depicting the Austronesian Migration "Out of Taiwan" model.

The Ilocano language, also known as Iloco, belongs to the Austronesian language family, specifically within the Malayo-Polynesian branch. It is widely believed to have originated in Taiwan through the "Out of Taiwan" migration theory. This theory, proposed by archaeologist Peter Bellwood, posits that the Philippines was populated by Austronesian-speaking people who migrated from Taiwan around 3,000 BCE.

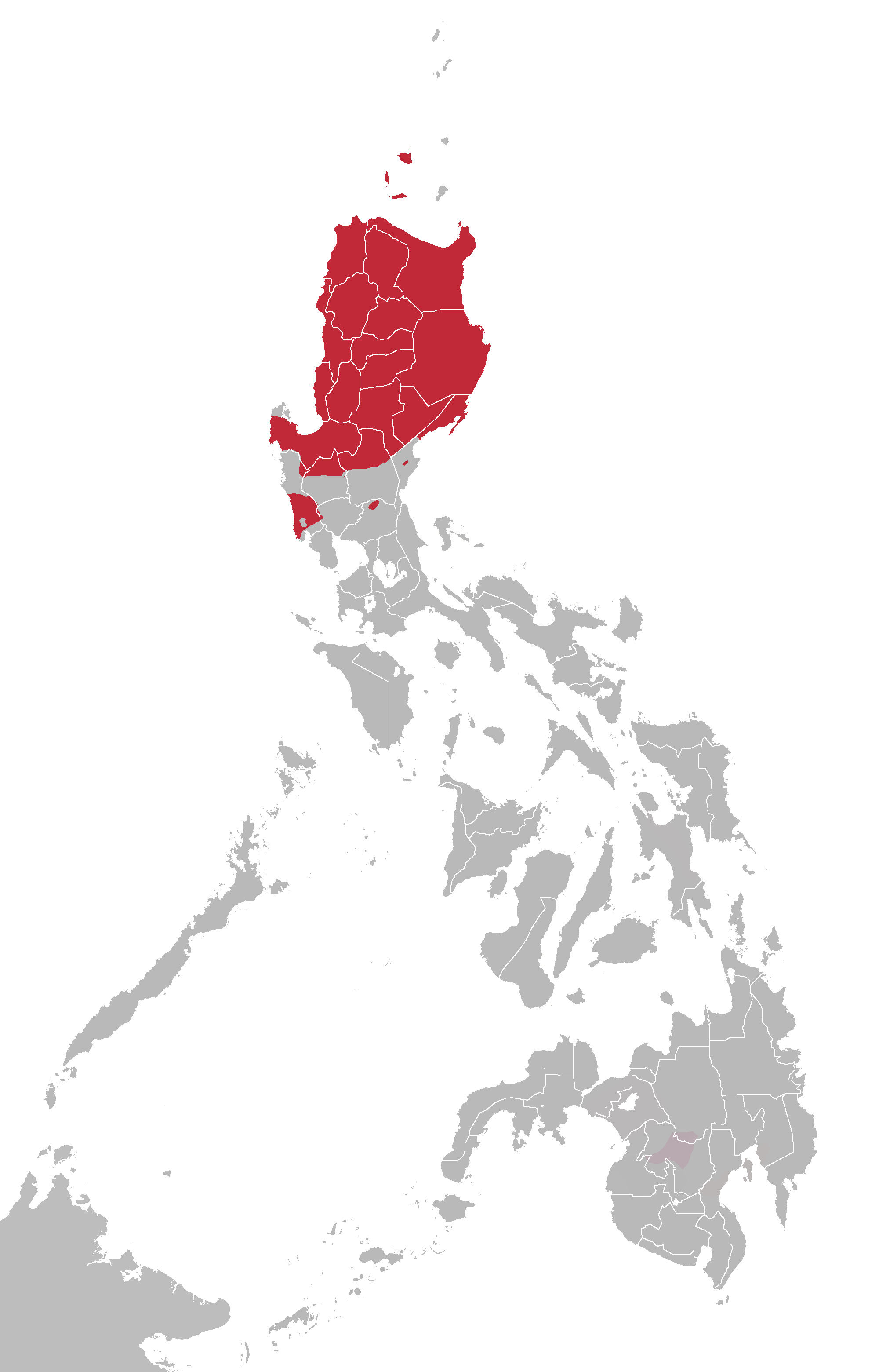
Map of Northern Luzon languages

Ilocano constitutes its own branch within the Philippine Cordilleran subfamily, which is part of the larger Northern Luzon languages. It is spoken as a first language by approximately eight million people. Linguist Lawrence Reid, an expert in Austronesian languages, categorizes over thirty Northern Luzon languages into five main branches: Northeastern Luzon, Cagayan Valley, Meso-Cordilleran, with Ilocano (Iloco) and Arta further classified as group-level isolates.

- Northern Luzon languages
  - Ilokano (Ilocos Norte, Ilocos Sur, and La Union)
  - Northern Cordilleran
    - Isneg (northern Apayao)
    - Ibanagic
      - Ibanag (Cagayan and Isabela)
      - Gaddangic
        - Gaddang (Nueva Vizcaya and Isabela)
        - Ga'dang (Mountain Province, Ifugao, Kalinga Province, Aurora and Nueva Vizcaya)
        - Itawis (southern Cagayan and Apayao)
        - Yogad (Isabela)
  - Central Cordilleran
    - Isinai (northern Nueva Vizcaya, north Nueva Ecija, northwest Aurora)
    - Kalinga–Itneg
      - Kalinga (Kalinga)
      - Itneg (Abra)
    - Nuclear
      - Ifugao (Ifugao)
      - Balangao (eastern Mountain Province)
      - Bontok (central Mountain Province)
      - Kankanaey (western Mountain Province, northern Benguet)
  - Southern Cordilleran
    - Bugkalot/Ilongot (eastern Nueva Vizcaya, western Quirino, north Nueva Ecija, northwest Aurora)
    - Pangasinan (Pangasinan)
    - Nuclear
      - Ibaloi (southern Benguet, east La Union, west Nueva Vizcaya)
      - Karao (Karao, Bokod, Benguet)
      - Kalanguya/Kallahan (eastern Benguet, Ifugao, northwestern Nueva Vizcaya, north Nueva Ecija)
      - Kalanguya Keley-i
      - Kalanguya Kayapa
      - Kalanguya Tinoc

Serving as a lingua franca for much of Northern Luzon and parts of Central Luzon, Ilocano is also spoken as a second language by over two million individuals. These speakers include native speakers of languages such as Ibanag, Itawes, Ivatan, Bolinao, Pangasinan, Sambal, and other regional languages.

== Geographic distribution ==
The Iloco language is primarily spoken in Northern Luzon with 8.7 million native speakers and about 2 million as second language, where the highest concentration of Iloco speakers remains in their home provinces in Ilocos Region, totaling approximately three million. As of the 2020 census, Iloco speakers account for 5.8% of the Philippine population, or 3,083,391 individuals, with the majority residing in the Ilocos Region. The province of Pangasinan has the largest number of Iloco speakers, at 1,258,746, followed by La Union with 673,312, Ilocos Sur with 580,484, and Ilocos Norte with 570,849.

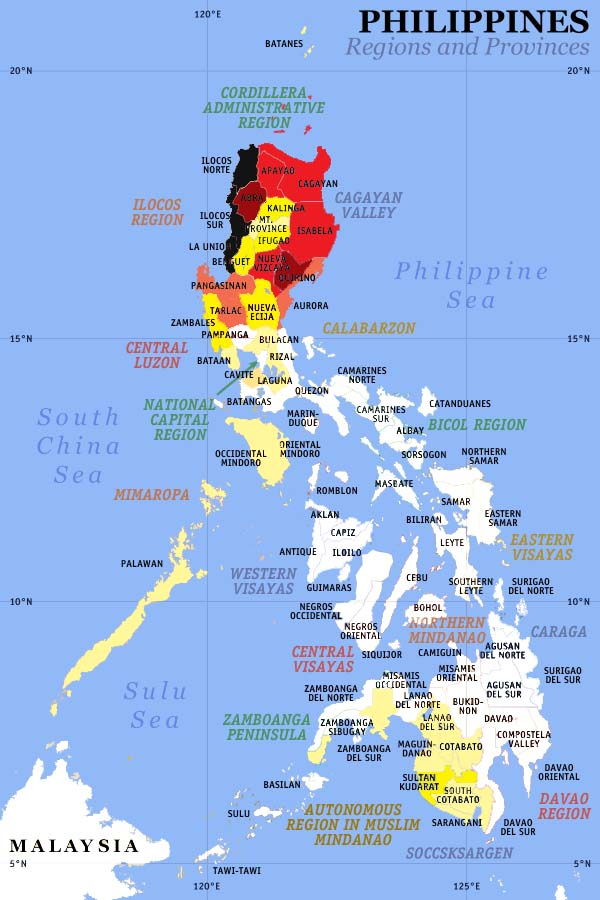
Ilocano-speaking density across provinces. Enlarge for detailed percent distribution.

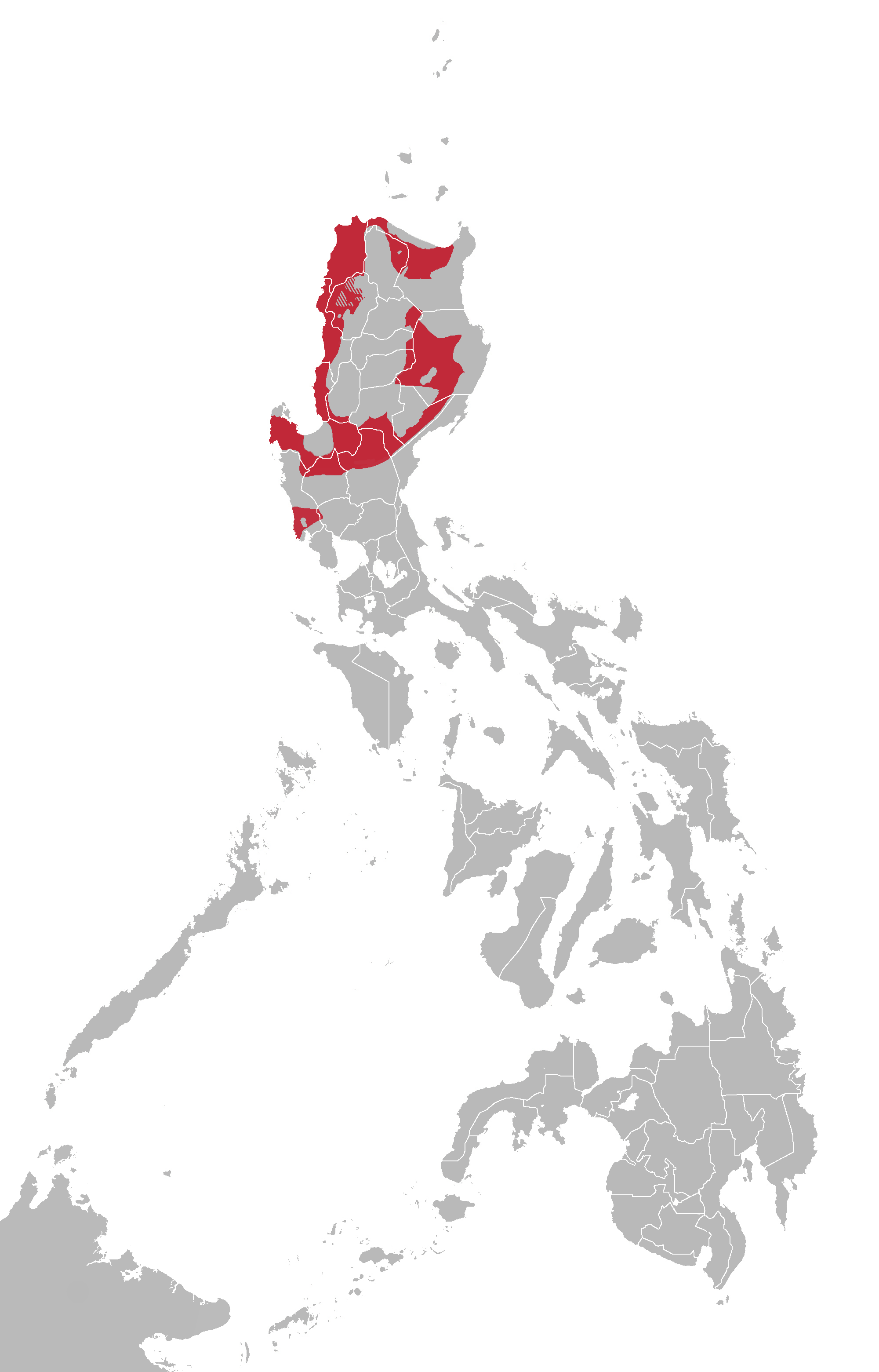
Map of Ilocano-speaking areas, with striped regions showing Itneg-Ilocano bilingual communities in Abra.

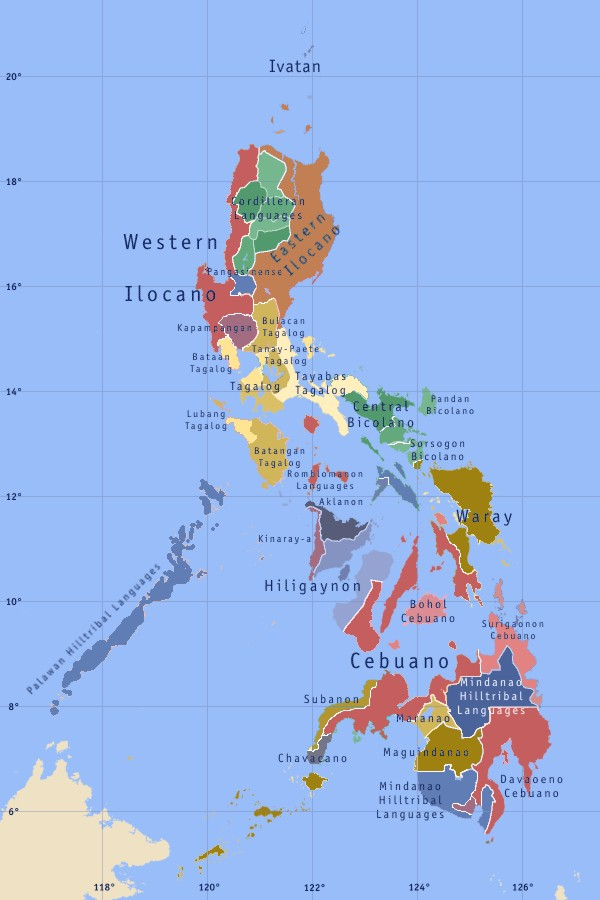
Areas where Iloco is the majority language, highlighting regions with the highest concentration of speakers.

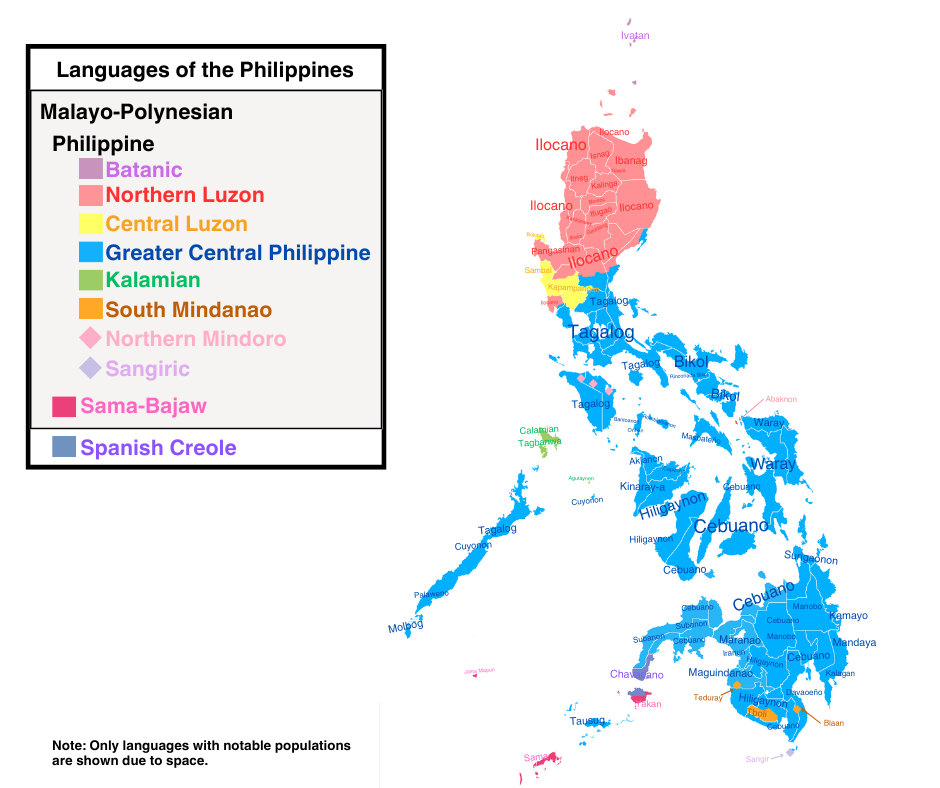
Map of the areas where Ilocano is the majority native language.

In Cagayan Valley, Iloco speakers number 2,274,435, representing 61.8% of the region's population. Isabela has the highest number of Iloco speakers at 1,074,212, followed by Cagayan with 820,546, Nueva Vizcaya with 261,901, Quirino with 117,360, and Batanes with 416. In the Cordillera Administrative Region (CAR), where Iloco serves as a lingua franca among the Cordilleran (Igorot) people, the number of Iloco speakers totals 396,713, comprising 22.1% of the region's population. The province of Abra, formerly part of the Ilocos Region, has the highest number of Iloco speakers at 145,492, followed by Benguet (including Baguio City) with 138,022, Apayao with 47,547, Kalinga with 31,812, Ifugao with 26,677, and Mountain Province with 7,163 Iloco speakers.

Outside of Northern Luzon, Central Luzon is home to 10.8% of Iloco speakers, or 1,335,283 individuals. In Tarlac, 555,000 Iloco speakers were recorded, followed by Nueva Ecija with 369,864, Zambales (including Olongapo City) with 183,629, Bulacan with 97,603, Aurora with 65,204, Pampanga (including Angeles City) with 40,862, and Bataan with 29,121. In the National Capital Region (NCR), 762,629 Iloco speakers were documented, while CALABARZON has 330,774 Iloco speakers, and MIMAROPA (with a majority in Mindoro and Palawan) has 117,635. In the Bicol Region, there are 15,434 Iloco speakers.

In the Visayas, there are 13,079 Iloco speakers, and in Mindanao, the number reaches 416,796. The SOCCSKSARGEN region in Mindanao has the highest concentration of Iloco speakers, with 248,033, the majority of whom reside in Sultan Kudarat (97,983).

Internationally, Iloco is spoken in the United States, with the largest concentrations in Hawaii and California, as well as in Canada. In Hawaii, 17% of those who speak a non-English language at home speak Iloco, making it the most spoken non-English language in the state.

In September 2012, the province of La Union became the first in the Philippines to pass an ordinance recognizing Ilocano (Iloko) as an official provincial language, alongside Filipino and English. This ordinance aims to protect and revitalize the Ilocano language, although other languages, such as Pangasinan, Kankanaey, and Ibaloi, are also spoken in La Union.

== Writing system ==
=== Modern alphabet ===
The modern Ilokano alphabet consists of 29 letters: Aa, Bb, Cc, Dd, Ee, Ff, Gg, Hh, Ii, Jj, Kk, Ll, LLll, Mm, Nn, Ññ, NGng, Oo, Pp, Qq, Rr, Ss, Tt, Uu, Vv, Ww, Xx, Yy, and Zz

=== Pre-colonial ===
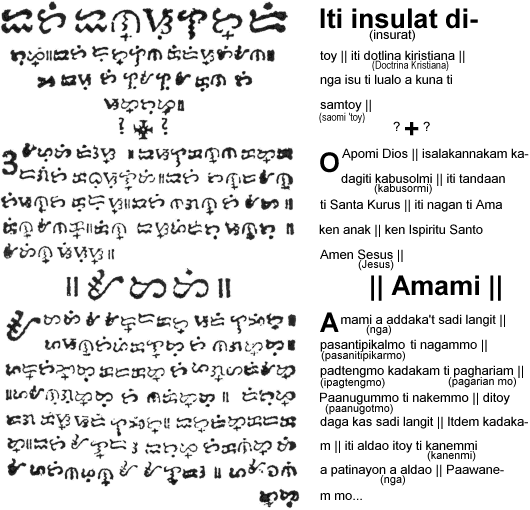
The Lord's Prayer from Doctrina Cristiana, 1621. Written in Iloco using Baybayin script.

Pre-colonial Ilocano people of all classes wrote in a syllabic system known as Baybayin before the arrival of Europeans. It is a system that is termed as an abugida, or an alphasyllabary, where each character represented a consonant-vowel, or CV, sequence. The Ilocano version of the Doctrina Cristiana, "Libro a Naisuratan amin ti bagas ti Doctrina Cristiana", published in 1621, was the first to designate coda consonants with a diacritic mark – a cross or virama. Before the addition of the virama, writers had no way to designate coda consonants. The reader, on the other hand, had to guess whether a consonant not succeeding a vowel is read or not, for it is not written. Vowel apostrophes interchange between e or i, and o or u. Due to this, the vowels e and i are interchangeable, and letters o and u, for instance, tendera and tindira ('shop-assistant').

=== Modern ===
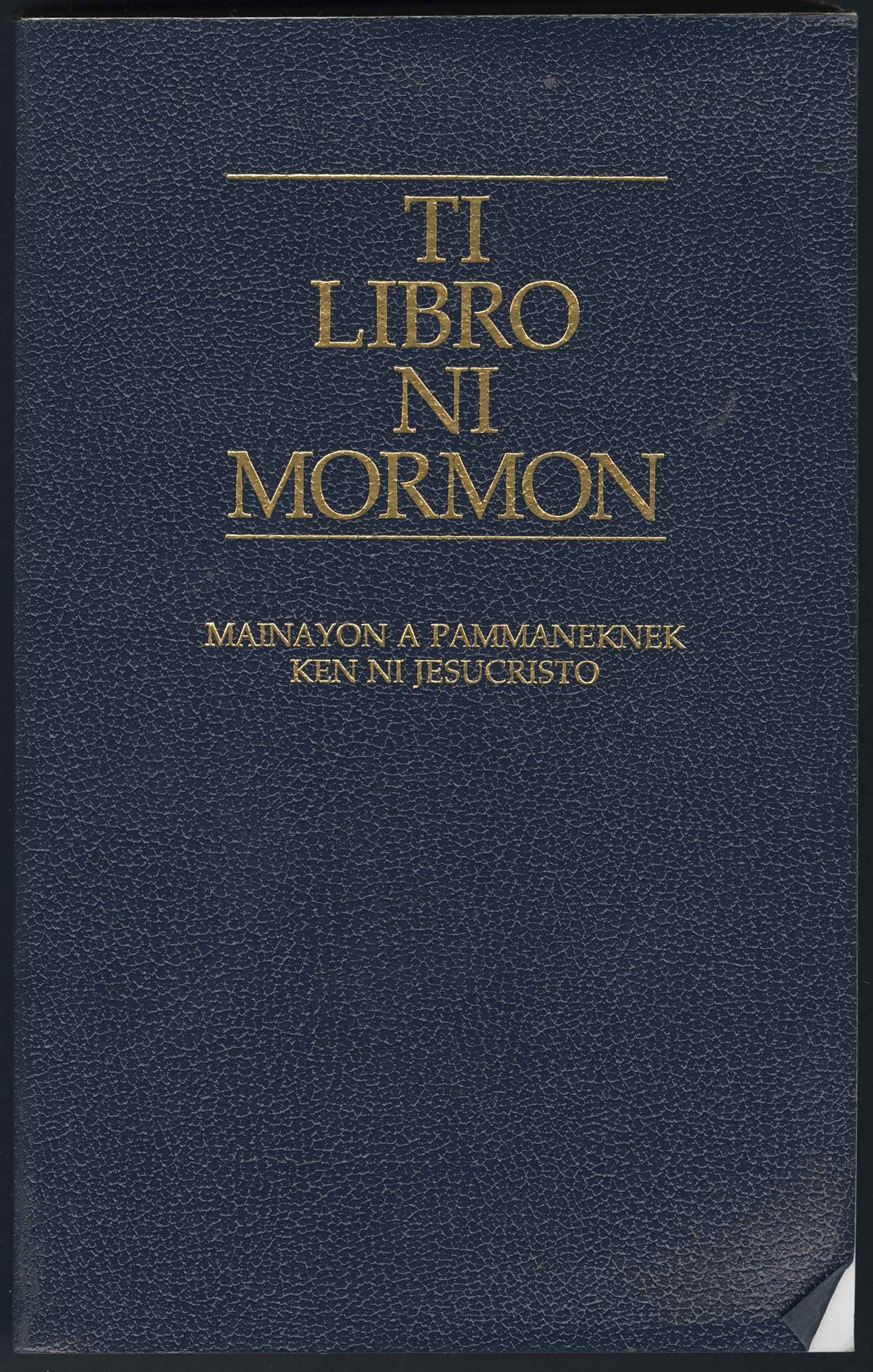
Ilocano version of the Book of Mormon, written with the Tagalog system, as can be seen by the use of the letter K

In recent times, there have been two systems in use: the Spanish system and the Tagalog system. In the Spanish system words of Spanish origin kept their spellings. Native words, on the other hand, conformed to the Spanish rules of spelling. Most older generations of Ilocanos use the Spanish system.

In the alphabet system based on that of Tagalog there is more of a phoneme-to-letter correspondence, which better reflects the actual pronunciation of the word. (Note: However, there are notable exceptions. The reverse is true for the vowel /u/ where it has two representations in native words. The vowel /u/ is written o when it appears in the last syllable of the word or of the root, for example kitaemonto /ki.ta.e.mun.tu/. In addition, e represents two vowels in the southern dialect: [ɛ] and [ɯ].) The letters ng constitute a digraph and count as a single letter, following n in alphabetization. As a result, numo ('humility') appears before ngalngal ('to chew') in newer dictionaries. Words of foreign origin, most notably those from Spanish, need to be changed in spelling to better reflect Ilocano phonology. Words of English origin may or may not conform to this orthography. A prime example using this system is the weekly magazine Bannawag.

=== Samples of the two systems ===
The following are two versions of the Lord's Prayer. The one on the left is written using Spanish-based orthography, while the one on the right uses the Tagalog-based system.

| Amami, ñga addaca sadi lañgit, Madaydayao cuma ti Naganmo. Umay cuma ti pagariam. Maaramid cuma ti pagayatam Cas sadi lañgit casta met ditoy daga. Itedmo cadacami iti taraonmi iti inaldao. Quet pacaoanennacami cadaguiti ut-utangmi, A cas met panamacaoanmi Cadaguiti nacautang cadacami. Quet dinacam iyeg iti pannacasulisog, No di quet isalacannacami iti daques. | Amami, nga addaka sadi langit, Madaydayaw koma ti Naganmo. Umay koma ti pagariam. Maaramid koma ti pagayatam Kas sadi langit kasta met ditoy daga. Itedmo kadakami iti taraonmi iti inaldaw. Ket pakawanennakami kadagiti ut-utangmi, A kas met panamakawanmi Kadagiti nakautang kadakami. Ket dinakam iyeg iti pannakasulisog, No di ket isalakannakami iti dakes. |

==== Comparison between the two systems ====
| Rules | Spanish-based | Tagalog-based | Translation |
|---|---|---|---|
| c → k | tocac | tukak | frog |
| ci, ce → si, se | acero | asero | steel |
| ch → ts | ocho | otso | eight |
| f → p^{1} | familia | pamilia | family |
| gui, gue → gi, ge | daguiti | dagiti | the |
| ge, gi → he, hi^{2} | página | pahina | page |
| ll → li | caballo | kabalio | horse |
| ñ → ni | baño | banio | bathroom |
| ñg, ng̃ → ng | ñgioat, ng̃ioat | ngiwat | mouth |
| Vo(V) → Vw(V) | aoan aldao | awan aldaw | nothing day |
| qui, que → ki, ke | iquit | ikit | aunt |
| v → b | voces | boses | voice |
| z → s | zapatos | sapatos | shoe |

Notes

1. In Ilocano phonology, the labiodental fricative sound /f/ does not exist. Its approximate sound is /p/. Therefore, in words of Spanish or English origin, /f/ becomes /p/. In particular (yet not always the case), last names beginning with /f/ are often said with /p/, for example Fernández /per.'nan.des/.2. The sound /h/ only occurs in loanwords, and in the negative variant haan.

== Education ==
Historically, with the implementation by the Spanish of the Bilingual Education System of 1897, Ilocano, together with the other seven major languages (those that have at least a million speakers), was allowed to be used as a medium of instruction until the second grade. It is recognized by the Commission on the Filipino Language as one of the major languages of the Philippines. Constitutionally, Ilocano is an auxiliary official language in the regions where it is spoken and serves as auxiliary media of instruction therein.

In 2009, the Department of Education instituted Department Order No. 74, s. 2009 stipulating that "mother tongue-based multilingual education" would be implemented. In 2012, Department Order No. 16, s. 2012 stipulated that the mother tongue-based multilingual system was to be implemented for Kindergarten to Grade 3 Effective School Year 2012–2013. Ilocano is used in public schools mostly in the Ilocos Region and the Cordilleras. It is the primary medium of instruction from Kindergarten to Grade 3 (except for the Filipino and English subjects) and is also a separate subject from Grade 1 to Grade 3. Thereafter, English and Filipino are introduced as mediums of instruction.

== Literature ==
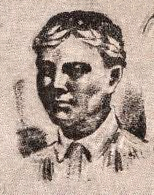
Pedro Bucaneg the "Ama ti Literatura Ilocano" or Father of Ilocano literature

Ilocano literature traces its origins to the animistic past of the Ilocano people. Key narratives include creation myths featuring figures such as Aran, Angalo, and Namarsua, the Creator, alongside tales of benevolent and malevolent spirits.

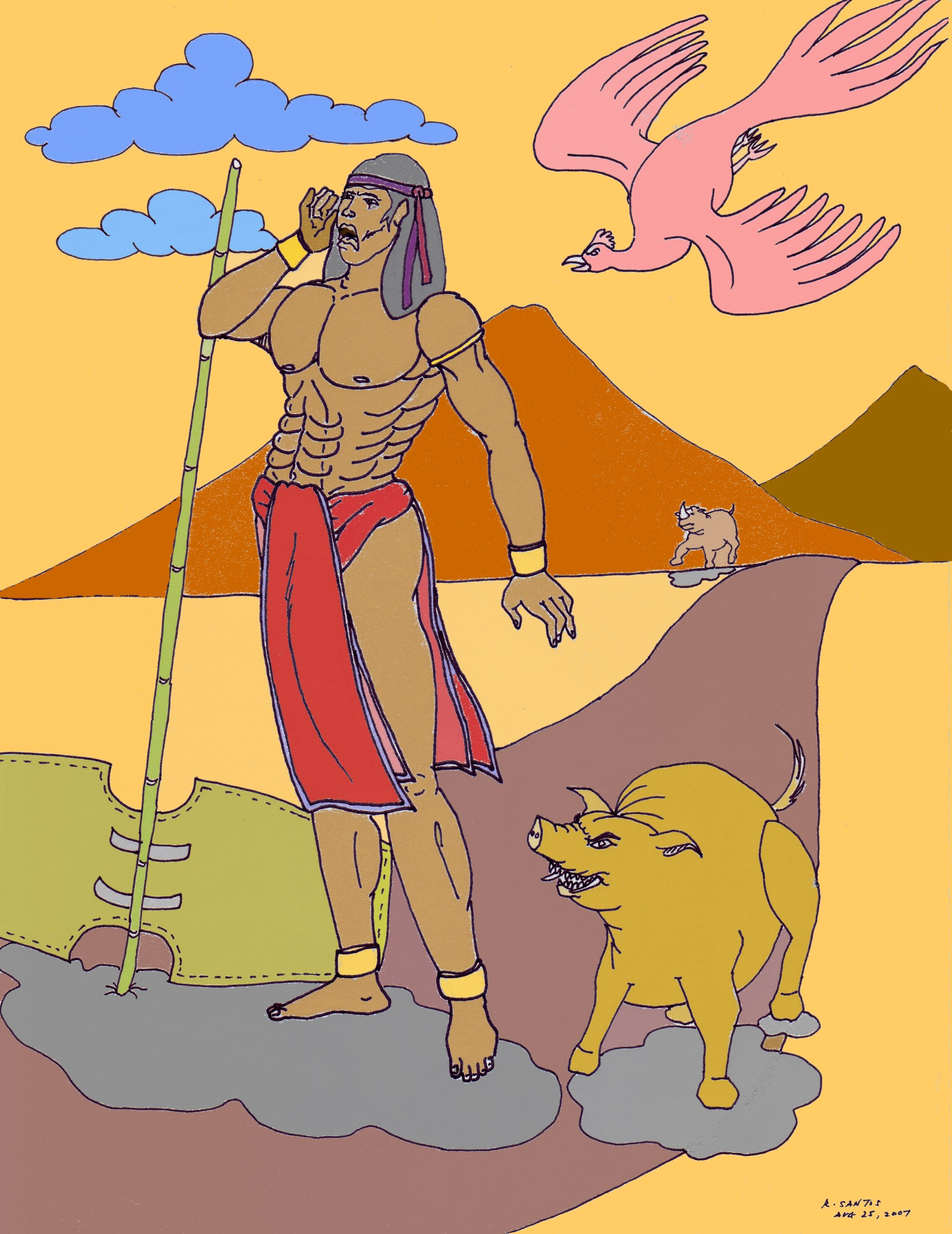
An illustration depicting the Ilocano epic protagonist Lam-ang

Ancient Ilocano poets articulated their expressions through folk and war songs, as well as the dállot, an improvised long poem delivered in a melodic manner. A significant work within this literary tradition is the epic Biag ni Lam-ang (The Life of Lam-ang), which is one of the few indigenous narratives that have survived colonial influence.

Ilocano culture is further celebrated through life rituals, festivities, and oral traditions, expressed in songs (kankanta), dances (salsala), poems (dandániw), proverbs (pagsasao), and literary duels (bucanegan), which all preserve Ilocano identity and demonstrate its adaptability within the evolving Filipino cultural landscape.

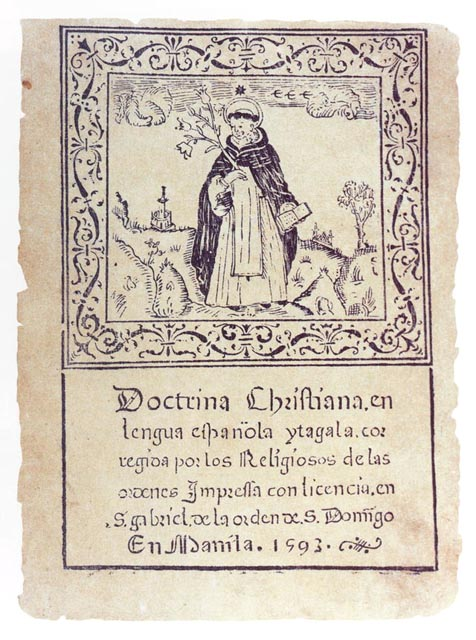
Doctrina Cristiana by Francisco Lopez

During the Spanish regime, Iloco poetry was heavily influenced by Spanish literary forms, with the earliest written Iloco poems largely based on romances translated from Spanish by Francisco Lopez. In 1621, Lopez published the Doctrina Christiana, the first book printed in Iloco. The 17th-century author Pedro Bucaneg, known for his collaboration with Lopez on the Doctrina, is celebrated as the "Father of Ilocano Poetry and Literature, credited for composing the epic poem Biag ni Lam-ang ("Life of Lam-ang"), which narrates the adventures of the Ilocano hero Lam-ang. A study of Iloco poetry can also be found in the Gramatica Ilokana, published in 1895, which is based on Lopez's earlier work, Arte de la Lengua Iloca, published in 1627 but likely written before 1606.

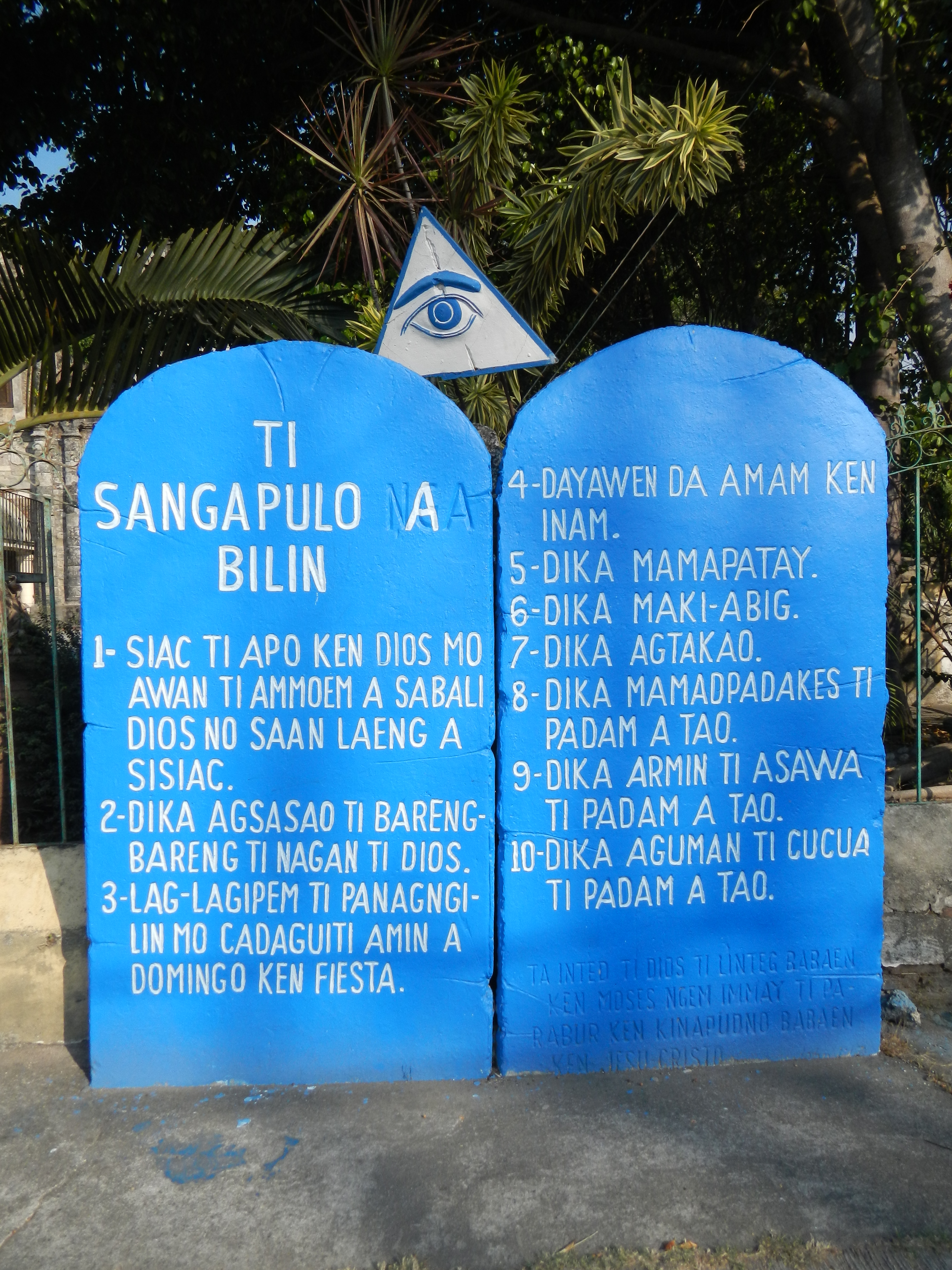
The Ten Commandments in Ilocano

In the 18th century, missionaries became involved in promoting literacy and religious education among the Ilocano population through the publication of religious and secular texts, including Sumario de las Indulgencias de la Santa Correa by Jacinto Rivera and a translation of St. Vincent Ferrer's sermons by Antonio Mejia. The 19th century witnessed the rise of Leona Florentino, who has been recognized as the National Poetess of the Philippines, although her sentimental poetry received criticism from modern readers for lacking depth and structure.

The early 20th century brought forth notable Ilocano writers such as Manuel Arguilla, who was a guerrilla fighter during World War II, and Carlos Bulosan who authored the novel America Is in the Heart. Other distinguished writers from this period include Sionil Jose, known for his epic sagas set in Pangasinan, and Isabelo de los Reyes, who was involved in preserving and publishing Ilocano literary works, including the earliest known text of Biag ni Lam-ang.

== Phonology ==
=== Segmental ===
==== Vowels ====
While there is no official dialectology for Ilocano, the usually agreed dialects of Ilocano are two, which are differentiated only by the way the letter e is pronounced. In the Amiánan (Northern) dialect, there exist only five vowels while the older Abagátan (Southern) dialect employs six.

- Amianan: /a/, /i/, /u/, /ɛ ~ e/, /o/
- Abagatan: /a/, /i/, /u/, /ɛ ~ e/, /o/, /ɯ/

Reduplicate vowels are voiced separately with an intervening glottal stop:

- saan: /sa.ʔan/ 'no'
- siit: /si.ʔit/ 'thorn'

The letter in bold is the graphic (written) representation of the vowel.

Ilokano vowel chart
| | Front | Central | Back |
|---|---|---|---|
| Close | **i** /i/ | | **u**/**o** /u/ **e** /ɯ/ |
| Mid | **e** /ɛ ~ e/ | | **o** /o/ |
| Open | | **a** /a/ | |

For a better rendition of vowel distribution, please refer to the IPA Vowel Chart.

Unstressed /a/ is pronounced [ɐ] in all positions except final syllables, like madí [mɐˈdi] ('cannot be') but ngiwat ('mouth') is pronounced [ˈŋiwat]. Unstressed /a/ in final-syllables is mostly pronounced [ɐ] across word boundaries.

Although the modern (Tagalog) writing system is largely phonetic, there are some notable conventions.

===== O/U and I/E =====
In native morphemes, the close back rounded vowel /u/ is written differently depending on the syllable. If the vowel occurs in the ultima of the morpheme, it is written o; elsewhere, u.

Example:

- Root: luto 'cook'
  - agluto 'to cook'
    - lutuen 'to cook (something)'; example: lutuen dayta

Instances such as masapulmonto, 'You will manage to find it, to need it', are still consistent. Note that masapulmonto is, in fact, three morphemes: masapul (verb base), -mo (pronoun) and -(n)to (future particle). An exception to this rule, however, is laud /la.ʔud/ ('west'). Also, u in final stressed syllables can be pronounced [o], like [dɐ.ˈnom] for danum ('water').

The two vowels are not highly differentiated in native words due to fact that /o/ was an allophone of /u/ in the history of the language. In words of foreign origin, notably Spanish, they are phonemic.

Example: uso 'use'; oso 'bear'

Unlike u and o, i and e are not allophones, but i in final stressed syllables in words ending in consonants can be [ɛ], like ubíng [ʊ.ˈbɛŋ] ('child').

The two closed vowels become glides when followed by another vowel. The close back rounded vowel /u/ becomes [w] before another vowel; and the close front unrounded vowel /i/, [j].

Example: kuarta /kwaɾ.ta/ 'money'; paria /paɾ.ja/ 'bitter melon'

In addition, dental/alveolar consonants become palatalized before /i/. (See Consonants below).

Unstressed /i/ and /u/ are pronounced [ɪ] and [ʊ] except in final syllables, like pintás ('beauty') [pɪn.ˈtas] and buténg ('fear') [bʊ.ˈtɛŋ, bʊ.ˈtɯŋ] but bangir ('other side') and parabur ('grace/blessing') are pronounced [ˈba.ŋiɾ] and [pɐ.ˈɾa.buɾ]. Unstressed /i/ and /u/ in final syllables are mostly pronounced [ɪ] and [ʊ] across word boundaries.

===== Pronunciation of ⟨e⟩ =====
The letter ⟨e⟩ represents two vowels in the non-nuclear dialects (areas outside the Ilocos provinces) [ɛ ~ e] in words of foreign origin and [ɯ] in native words, and only one in the nuclear dialects of the Ilocos provinces, [ɛ ~ e].

Realization of ⟨e⟩
| Word | Gloss | Origin | Nuclear | Non-nuclear |
|---|---|---|---|---|
| **keddeng** | 'assign' | Native | [kɛd.dɛŋ, ked.deŋ] | [kɯd.dɯŋ] |
| **elepante** | 'elephant' | Spanish | [ʔɛ.lɛ.pan.tɛ, ʔe.le.pan.te] | |

==== Diphthongs ====
Diphthongs are combination of a vowel and /i/ or /u/. In the orthography, the secondary vowels (underlying /i/ or /u/) are written with their corresponding glide, y or w, respectively. Of all the possible combinations, only /aj/ or /ej/, /iw/, /aw/ and /uj/ occur. In the orthography, vowels in sequence such as uo and ai, do not coalesce into a diphthong, rather, they are pronounced with an intervening glottal stop, for example, buok 'hair' /bʊ.ʔok/ and dait 'sew' /da.ʔit/.

Diphthongs
| Diphthong | Orthography | Example |
|---|---|---|
| /au/ | aw (for native words) / au (for spanish loanwords) | kabaw 'senile', autoridad 'authority' |
| /iu/ | iw | iliw 'home sick' |
| /ai/ | ay (for native words) / ai (for spanish loanwords) | maysa 'one', baile 'dance' |
| /ei/ (Note: The diphthong /ei/ is a variant of /ai/.) | ey | idiey 'there' (regional variant; standard idiay) |
| /oi/, /ui/ (Note: The distinction between /o/ and /u/ is minimal.) | oy, uy | baboy 'pig' |

The diphthong /ei/ is a variant of /ai/ in native words. Other occurrences are in words of Spanish and English origin. Examples are reyna /ˈɾei.na/ (from Spanish reina, 'queen') and treyner /ˈtɾei.nɛɾ/ ('trainer'). The diphthongs /oi/ and /ui/ may be interchanged since /o/ is an allophone of /u/ in final syllables. Thus, apúy ('fire') may be pronounced /ɐ.ˈpoi/ and baboy ('pig') may be pronounced /ˈba.bui/.

As for the diphthong /au/, the general rule is to use /aw/ for native words while /au/ will be used for spanish loanword such as the words autoridad, autonomia, automatiko. The same rule goes to the diphthong /ai/.

==== Consonants ====
| | | Bilabial | Dental/ Alveolar | Palatal | Velar | Glottal |
|---|---|---|---|---|---|---|
| Stops | Voiceless | **p** | **t** | | **k** | **(# (Note: The '#' represents the start of the word boundary)∅ (Note: the symbol '∅' represents zero or an absence of a phoneme.) V/∅V∅/C-V)** [ʔ] (Note: Ilocano syllables always begin with a consonant onset. Words that begin with a vowel actually begin with a glottal stop ('[ʔ]'), but it is not shown in the orthography. When the glottal stop occurs within a word there are two ways it is represented. When two vowels are juxtaposed, except certain vowel combinations beginning with /i/ or /u/ which in fact imply a glide /j/ or /w/, the glottal stop is implied. Examples: buok hair [buː.ʔok], dait sew [daː.ʔit], but not ruar outside [ɾwaɾ]. However, if the previous syllable is closed (ends in a consonant) and the following syllable begins with a glottal stop, a hyphen is used to represent it, for example lab-ay bland [lab.ʔai].) |
| Stops | Voiced | **b** | **d** | | **g** | |
| Affricates | Voiceless | | | **(ts, tiV)** [tʃ] (Note: Letters in parentheses are orthographic conventions that are used.) | | |
| Affricates | Voiced | | | **(diV)** [dʒ] | | |
| Fricatives | | | **s** | **(siV)** [ʃ] | | **h** |
| Nasals | | **m** | **n** | **(niV)** [nʲ] | **ng** [ŋ] | |
| Laterals | | | **l** | **(liV)** [lʲ] | | |
| Flaps | | | **r** [ɾ] | | | |
| Trills | | | (**rr** [r]) | | | |
| Semivowels | | **(w, CuV)** [w] | | **(y, CiV)** [j] | | |

All consonantal phonemes except /h, ʔ/ may be a syllable onset or coda. The phoneme /h/ is a borrowed sound (except in the negative variant haan) and rarely occurs in coda position. Although the Spanish word reloj 'clock' would have been heard as [re.loh], the final /h/ is dropped resulting in /re.lo/. However, this word also may have entered the Ilokano lexicon at early enough a time that the word was still pronounced /re.loʒ/, with the j pronounced as in French, resulting in /re.los/ in Ilokano. As a result, both /re.lo/ and /re.los/ occur.

The glottal stop /ʔ/ is not permissible as coda; it can only occur as onset. Even as an onset, the glottal stop disappears in affixation. Take, for example, the root aramat [ʔɐ.ɾa.mat], 'use'. When prefixed with ag-, the expected form is *[ʔɐɡ.ʔɐ.ɾa.mat]. But, the actual form is [ʔɐ.ɡɐ.ɾa.mat]; the glottal stop disappears. In a reduplicated form, the glottal stop returns and participates in the template, CVC, agar-aramat [ʔɐ.ɡaɾ.ʔɐ.ɾa.mat]. Glottal stop /ʔ/ sometimes occurs non-phonemically in coda in words ending in vowels, but only before a pause.

Stops are pronounced without aspiration. When they occur as coda, they are not released, for example, sungbat [sʊŋ.bat̚] 'answer', 'response'.

Ilokano is one of the Philippine languages which is excluded from [ɾ]-[d] allophony, as /r/ in many cases is derived from a Proto-Austronesian *R; compare bago (Tagalog) and baró (Ilokano) 'new'.

The language marginally has a trill [r] which is spelled as rr, for example, serrek [sɯ.ˈrɯk ~ se.ˈrek] 'to enter'. Trill [r] is sometimes an allophone of [ɾ] in word-initial position, syllable-final, and word-final positions, spelled as single ⟨r⟩, for example, ruar 'outside' [ɾwaɾ] ~ [rwar]. It is only pronounced flap [ɾ] in affixation and across word boundaries, especially when vowel-ending word precedes word-initial ⟨r⟩. But it is different in proper names of foreign origin, mostly Spanish, like Serrano, which is correctly pronounced [sɛ.ˈrano]. Some speakers, however, pronounce Serrano as [sɛ.ˈɾano].

=== Prosody ===
==== Primary stress ====
The placement of primary stress is lexical in Ilocano. This results in minimal pairs such as /ˈkaː.jo/ ('wood') and /ka.ˈjo/ ('you' (plural or polite)) or /ˈkiː.ta/ ('class, type, kind') and /ki.ˈta/ ('see'). In written Ilokano the reader must rely on context, thus ⟨kayo⟩ and ⟨kita⟩. Primary stress can fall only on either the penult or the ultima of the root, as seen in the previous examples.

While stress is unpredictable in Ilokano, there are notable patterns that can determine where stress will fall depending on the structures of the penult, the ultima and the origin of the word.

- **Foreign words** – the stress of foreign (mostly Spanish) words adopted into Ilokano fall on the same syllable as the original. (Note: Spanish permits stress to fall on the antepenult. As a result, Ilokano will shift the stress to fall on the penult. For example, árabe an Arab becomes arábo in Ilocano.)

| Ilocano | Gloss | Comment |
|---|---|---|
| doktór | doctor | Spanish origin |
| agmaného | (to) drive | Spanish origin ('I drive') |
| agrekórd | (to) record | English origin (verb) |
| agtárget | to target | English origin (verb) |

- **CVC.'CV(C)#** but **'CVŋ.kV(C)#** – in words with a closed penult, stress falls on the ultima, except for instances of /-ŋ.k-/ where it is the penult.

| Ilocano | Gloss | Comment |
|---|---|---|
| addá | there is/are | Closed penult |
| takkí | feces | Closed penult |
| bibíngka | (a type of delicacy) | -ŋ.k sequence |

- **'C(j/w)V#** – in words whose ultima is a glide plus a vowel, stress falls on the ultima.

| Ilocano | Gloss | Comment |
|---|---|---|
| al-aliá | ghost | Consonant–glide–vowel |
| ibiáng | to involve (someone or something) | Consonant–glide–vowel |
| ressuát | creation | Consonant–glide–vowel |

- **C.'CV:.ʔVC#** – in words where VʔV and V is the same vowel for the penult and ultima, the stress falls on the penult.

| Ilocano | Gloss | Comment |
|---|---|---|
| buggúong | fermented fish or shrimp paste | Vowel–glottal–vowel |
| máag | idiot | Vowel–glottal–vowel |
| síit | thorn, spine, fish bone | Vowel–glottal–vowel |

==== Secondary stress ====
Secondary stress occurs in the following environments:

- Syllables whose coda is the onset of the next, i.e., the syllable before a geminate.

| Ilocano | Gloss | Comment |
|---|---|---|
| pannakakíta | ability to see | Syllable before geminate |
| keddéng | judgement, decision | Syllable before geminate |
| ubbíng | children | Syllable before geminate |

- Reduplicated consonant-vowel sequence resulting from morphology or lexicon.

| Ilocano | Gloss | Comment |
|---|---|---|
| agsasaó | speaks, is speaking | Reduplicate CV |
| ar-ariá | ghost, spirit | Reduplicate CV |
| agdadáit | sews, is sewing | Reduplicate CV |

==== Vowel length ====
Vowel length coincides with stressed syllables (primary or secondary) and only on open syllables except for ultimas, for example, /'ka:.jo/ 'tree' versus /ka.'jo/ (second person plural ergative pronoun).

==== Stress shift ====
As primary stress can fall only on the penult or the ultima, suffixation causes a shift in stress one syllable to the right. The vowel of open penults that result lengthen as a consequence.

| Stem | Suffix | Result | Gloss |
|---|---|---|---|
| /ˈpuː.dut/ (heat) | /-ɯn/ (Goal focus) | /pu.ˈduː.tɯn/ | to warm/heat (something) |
| /da.ˈlus/ (clean) | /-an/ (Directional focus) | /da.lu.ˈsan/ | to clean (something) |

== Grammar ==
Ilocano is typified by a predicate-initial structure. Verbs and adjectives occur in the first position of the sentence, then the rest of the sentence follows.

Ilocano uses a highly complex list of affixes (prefixes, suffixes, infixes and enclitics) and reduplications to indicate a wide array of grammatical categories. Learning simple root words and corresponding affixes goes a long way in forming cohesive sentences.

== Lexicon ==
=== Borrowings ===
Foreign accretion comes largely from Spanish, followed by English and smatterings of much older accretion from Hokkien (Min Nan), Arabic and Sanskrit.

Examples of Borrowing
| Word | Source | Original meaning | Ilocano meaning |
|---|---|---|---|
| arak | Arabic (via Malay) | drink similar to sake | generic alcoholic drink (more specifically, wine) |
| ukom | Arabic (via Malay) | judge | judge |
| karma | Sanskrit | deed (see Buddhism) | spirit |
| ragadi | Sanskrit (via Malay) | saw | saw |
| sarming | Malay | mirror | mirror |
| lako | Malay | marketable, saleable | merchandise |
| sanglay | Hokkien | to deliver goods | to deliver/Chinese merchant |
| agbuldos | English | to bulldoze | to bulldoze |
| kuarta | Spanish | cuarta ('quarter', a kind of copper coin) | money |
| kumosta | Spanish | greeting: ¿Cómo estás? ('How are you?') | How are you? |
| poder | Spanish | power | power, care |
| talier | Spanish | taller (workshop) | mechanic shop |

=== Common expressions ===
Ilokano shows a T-V distinction.

| English | Ilocano |
|---|---|
| Yes | Wen |
| No | Saan Haan (variant) |
| How are you? | Kumostaka? Kumostakayo? (polite and plural) |
| Good day | Naimbag nga aldaw. Naimbag nga aldawyo. (polite and plural) |
| Good morning | Naimbag a bigatmo. Naimbag a bigatyo. (polite and plural) |
| Good afternoon | Naimbag a malemmo. Naimbag a malemyo. (polite and plural) |
| Good evening | Naimbag a rabiim. Naimbag a rabiiyo. (polite and plural) |
| What is your name? | Ania ti naganmo? (often contracted to Ania't nagan mo? or Ana't nagan mo?) Ania ti naganyo? |
| Where's the bathroom? | Ayanna ti banio? |
| I do not understand | Saanko a maawatan/matarusan. Haanko a maawatan/matarusan. Diak maawatan/matarusan. |
| I love you | Ay-ayatenka. Ipatpategka. |
| I'm sorry. | Pakawanennak. Dispensarennak. |
| Thank you. | Agyamannak apo. Dios ti agngina. |
| Goodbye | Kastan/Kasta pay. (Till then); Sige. (Okay. Continue.); Innakon. (I'm going); Inkamin. (We are going) Ditakan. (You stay); Ditakayon. (You stay (pl.)) |
| I/me | Siak. |

=== Numbers, days, months ===
==== Numbers ====
Ilocano uses two number systems, one native and the other derived from Spanish.

Numbers
| 0 | ibbong awán (lit. 'none') | sero |
| 0.25 (1/4) | pagkapat | kuarto |
| 0.50 (1/2) | kagudua | mitad |
| 1 | maysá | uno |
| 2 | duá | dos |
| 3 | talló | tres |
| 4 | uppát | kuatro |
| 5 | limá | singko |
| 6 | inném | sais |
| 7 | pitó | siete |
| 8 | waló | otso |
| 9 | siám | nuebe |
| 10 | sangapuló (lit. 'a group of ten') | dies |
| 11 | sangapuló ket maysá | onse |
| 12 | sangapuló ket duá | dose |
| 20 | duápuló | beinte |
| 30 | tallópuló | treinta |
| 50 | limápuló | singkuenta |
| 100 | sangagasut (lit. 'a group of one hundred') | sien |
| 1,000 | sangaribo (lit. 'a group of one thousand'), ribo | mil |
| 10,000 | sangalaksa (lit. 'a group of ten thousand'), sangapulo a ribo | dies mil |
| 1,000,000 | sangariwriw (lit. 'a group of one million') | milion |
| 1,000,000,000 | sangabilion (American English, 'billion') | bilion (US-influenced), mil miliones |

Ilocano uses a mixture of native and Spanish numbers. Traditionally Ilocano numbers are used for quantities and Spanish numbers for time or days and references. Examples:

Spanish:

Mano ti tawenmo?
'How old are you (in years)?' (Lit. 'How many years do you have?')
Baintiuno.
'Twenty one.'

Luktanyo dagiti Bibliayo iti libro ni Juan kapitulo tres bersikolo diesiseis.
'Open your Bibles to the book of John chapter three verse sixteen.'

Ilocano:

Mano a kilo ti bagas ti kayatmo?
'How many kilos of rice do you want?'
Sangapulo laeng.
'Ten only.'

Adda dua nga ikanna.
'He has two fish.' (lit. 'There are two fish with him.')

==== Days of the week ====
Days of the week are directly borrowed from Spanish.

Days of the Week
| Monday | Lunes |
| Tuesday | Martes |
| Wednesday | Mierkoles |
| Thursday | Huebes |
| Friday | Biernes |
| Saturday | Sabado |
| Sunday | Domingo |

==== Months ====
Like the days of the week, the names of the months are taken from Spanish.

Months
| January | Enero | July | Hulio |
| February | Pebrero | August | Agosto |
| March | Marso | September | Septiembre |
| April | Abril | October | Oktubre |
| May | Mayo | November | Nobiembre |
| June | Hunio | December | Disiembre |

==== Units of time ====
The names of the units of time are either native or derived from Spanish. The first entries in the following table are native; the second entries are Spanish-derived.

Units of time
| second | kanito segundo |
| minute | daras minuto |
| hour | oras |
| day | aldaw |
| week | lawas dominggo (lit. 'Sunday'), semana (rare) |
| month | bulan |
| year | tawen anio |

To mention time, Ilocanos use a mixture of Spanish and Ilocano:

1:00 a.m. Ala una iti bigat (one in the morning)
2:30 p.m. Alas dos y media iti malem, in Spanish: A las dos y media de la tarde (half past two in the afternoon)
6:00 p.m Alas sais iti sardang (six in the evening)
7:00 p.m Alas siete iti rabii (seven in the evening)
12:00 noon Alas dose iti pangaldaw (twelve noon)

== More Ilocano words ==
Note: adjacent vowels are pronounced separately, and are not slurred together, as in ba-ak, or in la-ing

- abay = beside; wedding party
- abalayan = parents-in-law
- adal = study
- adayu = far
- adda = affirming the presence or existence of a person, place, or object
- ading = younger sibling; can also be applied to someone who is younger than the speaker
- adipen = slave
- ala = to take
- ammo = know
- anus = perseverance, patience (depends on the usage)
- ania/inia = what
- apan = go; to go
- apa = fight, argument; ice cream cone
- apay = why
- apong = grandparent
- apong baket/lilang/lola = grandmother
- apong lakay/lilong/lolo = grandfather
- aramid = build, work (Southern dialect)
- aruangan/ruangan = door
- asideg = near
- atiddug = long
- awan = none / nothing
- awan te remedio? = there is no cure?
- ay naku! = oh my goodness!
- ay sus!/Ay Apo! = oh, Jesus/oh, my God!
- baak = ancient; old
- bado = clothes; outfit; shirt
- bagi = one's body; ownership
- balitok = gold
- balong = same as baro
- bangles = spoiled food
- (i/bag)baga = (to) tell/speak
- bagtit= crazy/insanemauyong/balla = crazy/bad word in Ilokano, drunk person, meager
- baket = old woman
- balasang = young female/lass
- balatong = mung beans
- balay = house
- balong = infant/child
- bangsit = stink/unpleasant/spoiled
- baro = young male/lad
- basa = study; read
- basang = same as balasang
- bassit = few, small, tiny
- basol = fault, wrongdoing, sin
- baut = spank
- bayag = slow
- baybay = sea; bay
- binting = 25 cents/quarter
- buneng = bladed tool / sword
- dadael = destroy/ruin
- dakes = bad
- dakkel = big; large; huge
- (ma)damdama = later
- danon = to arrive at
- danug = punch
- diding/taleb/pader = wall
- dumanon = come
- gastos = spend
- ganus = unripe
- gasut = hundred
- gaw-at = reach
- (ag) gawid = go home
- giddan = simultaneous
- gur-ruod = thunder
- haan/saan/aan = no
- iggem = holding
- ikkan = to give
- inipis = cards
- intun bigat/intuno bigat = tomorrow
- kaanakan = niece / nephew
- kabalio = horse
- kabarbaro = new
- kabatiti = loofah
- kabsat/kabagis = sibling
- kallub = cover
- kanayon = always
- karruba = neighbor
- katawa = laugh
- katkatawa = is laughing
- kayat = want
- kayo = wood
- kayumanggi-kunig = yellowish brown
- kiaw/amarilio = yellow (as in the Castilian Spanish pronunciation)
- kibin = hold hands
- kigtut = startle
- kimat = lightning
- kuddot/keddel = pinch
- kumá = hoping for
- ina/inang/nanang = mother
- lastog = boast/arrogant
- lag-an = light/not heavy
- laeng = only, just
- laing/sirib = intelligence
- lawa = wide
- lugan = vehicle
- madi = hate/unable
- manang = older sister or relative; can also be applied to women a little older than the speaker
- mano = how many/how much
- manong = older brother or relative; can also be applied to men a little older than the speaker
- mare/kumare = female friend/mother
- met = also, too
- obra = work (Northern dialect)
- naimbag nga agsapa = good morning
- naapgad = salty
- nagasang, naadat = spicy
- (na)pintas = beautiful/pretty (woman)
- (na)ngato = high/above/up
- panaw = leave
- kompadre/pare = close male friend
- padi = priest
- (na)peggad = danger(ous)
- (ag)perdi = (to) break/ruin/damage
- pigis= tear
- pigsa = strength; strong
- piman = little one
- pimmusay(en) = died; passed away
- pungtot = wrath
- puon = root
- pustaan = bet, wager
- ridaw/bintana = window/s
- riing = wake up
- rigat = hardship
- rugi = start; beginning
- rugit = dirt/not clean
- ruot = weed/s
- rupa = face
- ruar = outside; out
- sagad = broom
- sala = dance
- sang-gol = arm wrestling
- sapul/birok = find; need; search
- (na)sakit = (it) hurts
- sida = noun for fish, main dish, side dish, viand
- siit = fish bone/thorn
- (na)singpet = kind/obedient
- suli = corner
- (ag)surat = (to) write
- tabbed/muno/nengneng = dumb
- tadem = sharpness (use for tools)
- takaw = steal
- takki = feces
- takrot/tarkok = coward/afraid
- tangken = hard (texture)
- tarong = eggplant
- tinnag = fall down
- (ag)tokar = to play music or a musical instrument
- torpe = rude; stupid
- tudo = rain
- (ag)tugaw = (to) sit
- tugawan = anything to sit on
- tugaw = chair; seat
- tuno = grill
- (na)tawid = inherit(ed); heritage
- ubing = kid; baby; child
- umay = to come; welcome
- unay = very much
- uliteg/tio = uncle
- uray = even though; wait
- uray siak met = me too; even I/me
- ulo = head
- upa = hen
- uston = stop it
- utong = string beans
- utot/daga = mouse/rat
- uttot = fart
- wen/wun = yes

Also of note is the yo-yo, probably named after the Ilocano word yóyo.

== See also ==
- Ilocano grammar
- Ilocano numbers
- Ilocano particles
- Ilocano verb
