= Ilocano particles =

Listing and use of Iloko discourse particles

Ilocano particles are an aspect of Ilocano grammar. Particles lack a meaning independent of a phrase or clause. For the most part, they impart meaning to the phrase or clause in which they occur.

Ilocano has two morphological types: enclitic and independent.

== Enclitic ==
Enclitic particles are very similar to the enclitic pronouns, in that they are tightly bound to the previous word with which they have a close relation. And, similar to the pronouns, their form depends on the last sound of the preceding word. These particles occur primarily with the Predicate of the sentence or clause.

=== -(e)n ===
The punctual particle lends the meaning of completion and punctuality or amazement. The speaker asserts that the idea expressed in the predicate is completed, or to emphasize that it is currently underway. Or, it can express an intense emotion.

- Forms:
  - -en - After consonants and diphthongs
  - -n - After simple vowels
- With Verb Predicates

The particle lends the meaning of now, presently, with progressive formations.

Mapmapanen He's going now!

In the negative, the particle has the meaning of any more.

Saanen nga agtudtudo. It is not raining any more.

Or, that a decision was made.

Saandan nga umay. They aren't coming any more. (They changed their minds.)

With the perfective, the idea is that the action had completed before the utterance.

Napanen He's already gone
Immayen He came already

When used in conjunction with the Future Particle -(n)to, the idea is that the action will have been completed some time in the future, in other words, a future perfect. Or, it used to assert future actions completed or states achieved.

Mapanton He will have left, "He *will* leave" 
Umayton  He will have come, "He *will* come" 

- With Noun Predicates

Nouns do not show aspect, in other words, completion or non-completion. Nevertheless, noun predicates with -(e)n express some form of perfective aspect and assertion of a fact. Also, -(e)n can impart the speaker's surprise that the fact is contrary to previous assumptions.

1) Balayen! It's (now) a house!
2) Balasangen ni Julia. Julia is (now) a young lady.

In example 1, the speaker is amazed. The speaker could have assumed that it was going to be another type of building. In example 2, the speaker had not visited Julia for a long time.

- With Pronouns

Pronouns used with this particle stand out among a set of others.

Isunan! Let him be the one! (No one else wants to do it. He's the only one who is capable.)
Dagitoyen ti aramatekto. These are the ones that I'll be using. (I don't want to use the others.)

- With Adjective Predicates

Similar to nouns, -(e)n imparts perfectiveness.

Atiddogen ti buokna. Her hair is already long

The perfective particle commonly accompanies the Nag- formation and adds further emphasis and adds wonderment.

Naglab-ayen! How bland!
Naddakkelen dayta a balay! That house is so big!

=== -(n)sa ===
The speculative particle lends the meaning of speculation or wonderment or uncertainty on behalf of the speaker.

- Forms:
  - -nsa - After simple vowels
  - -sa - After consonants and diphthongs

Pinataydansa ni Osama bin Laden.
 They must have killed Osama bin Laden.
 They might have killed Osama bin Laden.
 I think they killed Osama bin Laden.

When used with -(e)n, the speculation is about something that may have occurred in the past, but the speaker is not sure about the validity of the statement.

Nataysan ni Elvis.
 I think Elvis has died.
Impandansan idiay ospital.
I think that they sent her to the hospital.

=== -(n)to ===
The future is expressed with -(n)to attached to the Neutral form of the verb.

It has two forms:

- -nto - After simple vowels
- -to - Elsewhere: consonants and diphthongs (e.g., -ay, oy, etc.)

Examples:

Mapanakto
I will go.

Makitanto
It will be seen.

== Independent ==
Independent particles are words in their own right and do not attach to the previous word.

=== apo ===
Respect particle. Used in addressing superiors or strangers. It can be used with titles of family members, their names or titles of authority.

Wen, apo.
Yes, ma'am/sir.

Adda tao, apo.
(Announcement that you have arrived and are entering the house, lit. There are people.

=== aya ===
Particle used in questions expressing wonder, surprise or doubt.

Ammom aya ti maipapanna?
I wonder if you know what it means?

Nabangsit aya ti bugguong?
Really, 'bugguong' is smelly?

=== bassit ===
An adjective in its own right, bassit means small. But, as a particle, it is used to express a very short period of time. It can also be used in commands to express what is requested of the listener is trivial and/or will not take too long.

Umayka man bassit.
Please come (here) (for a bit/short while).

=== biit ===
Used to express a short period of time. Similar to bassit, it can be used in requests and softens the tone.

Umayka man biit
Please, come over.

=== di ===
Negative particle.

- It has no difference in meaning with saan. Like saan, personal pronouns and enclitic particles attach to it. Unlike saan, however, the ligature, a/nga, is not needed.

Saanda nga immay.
Dida immay.
They did not come

Saankayonto a mangan iti panrabii.
Dikayonto mangan iti panrabii.
You (plu.) will not eat dinner.

But, if the personal pronoun is ko, it is replaced by ak.

Saanko met nga ammo.
Diak met ammo. (Diko met ammo does not occur)
I don't know.

Saankon a maibaga.
Diakon maibaga.
I can no longer tell it.

- Used to create the negative or opposite of adjectives or other modifying elements. Similar to the negating prefixes in English: un-, in-, il-, ir-, etc.

ginagara
intentional, intended, intent

di-ginagara
unintentional

simpa
steady, flat, level

di-nasimpa
unsteady

- Sometimes used to introduce the apodosis in contrary-to-fact sentences.

No pay koma nasapaka a napan, di nakitam ni lolam a Maria.
If you would have gone earlier, (then) you would have seen your grandmother Mary.

=== gayam ===
- Used to express the speaker's discovery of new information. The information may be contradictory to what the speaker thought or believed.

Adda gayam baro a lugan ni Lucy. 
I see - Lucy has a new car.

Dominggo gayam ti padayada. Kunak no intuno bigat.
So, their party is on Sunday. I thought it was tomorrow.

Kasta gayam!  
So, it's going to be that way! 
So be it! (Said in concession)

Kasta gayam kadi?
Is it going to be that way?
Is it like that?

- Expresses the speaker's sudden recollection of something previous forgotten.

Adda gayam tulbekko
That's right. I have a key.

=== kadi ===
- Question particle. Similar to Tagalog "ba", Japanese "ka", and Chinese "ma."

Nanganka iti mangga.
You ate a mango. (Statement)

Nanganka kadi iti mangga?
Did you eat (a) mango. (Question)

- Used in questions that implore the listener.

Ikkannak ti pirak kadi?
Will you please give me money?

Mabalin kadi daytoy?
Is it possible?

- When used in a contrary fashion, it comes close to sarcasm.

Napanka kadi idiay eskuela.
You went to the school (so you say...)

- Softens commands as a question.

Umayka man kadi?
Can you come here?

- Used to counter a negative statement.

Saan a pudno.
It is not true.

Pudno kadi.
It is true, indeed.'

=== kano ===
Hearsay. Reporting particle that expresses that the information is second-hand; he said, she said, they said, it was said, reportedly, supposedly, allegedly.

Ania a kita ti prutas ti kayat ni Boboy?
Kayatna ti saba, kano.

What kind of fruit does Boboy want?
He said, he wants bananas.

=== kas(la) ===
Particle used in expressing similarity: like, as.

Agsassao kasla Tagalog.
He speaks like a Tagalog.

=== ketdi ===
Used to express the speaker's negative attitude toward the situation or fact being discussed. It is often used with -n attached to it or to the subject of the sentence. It is also used concede or counter what was expected.

Imbagak nga bassit ti kuartami. Ginantangna ketdin diay sapatos.
I told her that we don't have much money. She bought the shoes anyway.

=== ketno ===
Condition particle, expresses the unexpected condition to happen, if.

=== koma ===
The optative particle is used to express the following:

- Hope or necessity

Agadalda koma a nalaing.
They should study hard.

Pinilim koma 'ta nalabbaga.
You should have chosen the red one (instead).

- The protasis of contrary-to-fact sentences

No simmangpetak koma a nasapa, di saanko maikapis ti kasangayna.
If I had only arrived earlier, then I wouldn't have missed her birthday.

- In commands to entreat or make a plea to the listener

Saanmo koma iparuar diay aso.
Please, don't take the dog out.

Pumanawka koma.
Please, leave.

- In the idiom Sapay koma ta, I hope (that).

Sapay koma ta rumuar ti init.
I hope (that) the sun comes out.

Sapay koma ta umimbag ni lola.
I hope grandmother gets well.

=== la/laeng ===
A limitative particle: only, just.

Kayatna ti makan iti paria laeng.
He like to eat only bitter melon.

Siak la ti makiammo.
I'm the only who should know.

=== latta ===
- Limitative particle. It is interchangeable with la/laeng in most cases.

Sika latta
Sika laeng
Only you

- In other situations, it imparts precision (just this one and no other) or finality (this is it, I've made up my mind). The above examples can also be interpreted in the following manner.

Sika latta You alone, It's up to you (and no one else)
Sika laeng Only you

Napan latta. Dinak pay inasikaso.
He went on ahead. He didn't even pay any attention to me.

Note how pay is used. It indicates how he continued to ignore the speaker. It does not have a one-to-one translation.

=== man ===
- Used with imperatives. Softens the tone to a request.

Manang Biday, ilukatmo man 'ta bintana. 
(Older sister) Biday, please open the window.

- When used as a response, it expresses the speaker's frustration.

A: Immayda kadi? B: Saan man.
A: Did they come? B: No (and I am frustrated that they haven't yet).

- When used with interrogative words, it forms the indefinite series of pronouns.

Aniaman or Ania man
Whatever

=== met ===
Conversation shift particle.

- Adds what is being said to what was previously mentioned: also, too.

Kayatko met ti agbuya ti sine.
I want to watch a movie, too. 

Naimbag nga aldawmo.
Sika met.

Have a nice day.
You, too.

- Shifts the focus of the conversation from one subject or matter to another.

Sika met? 
What about you?

Sika met!
So, it was you!

- In negative sentences, the addition of met compounds the speaker's pessimism towards the situation.

Dida met immay.
They didn't even come.

- Also, it can be used in contrary statements.

Tallo met dagiti bituen ti watawat ti Pilipinas.
But, there are three stars on the Philippine flag.

Kastoy met?
So, it's like this? (Sarcastic) What the hell? Like this?

- Used for emphasis.

Sika met!
You!

Adda met ipis iti balayda.
There are cockroaches at their house.

=== ngamin/gamin ===
Asserts the speaker's attitude toward the cause of some action: because. The speaker may have a negative or contrary attitude. It is as if the speaker is saying, "If only you did what I told you...", "Regardless of what was said, I think that..."

Nabuong ngamin dagitoy baso, ta saanmo ida inkabil idiay lababo.
The glasses broke, because you didn't put them in the sink. 
(I thought you should have done that instead of leaving them on the floor)

Nalipatam ngamin.
That's because you forgot it.
(Of course, you don't have them on you!)
(You just had to forget them. Now, we have to go back and get them)

Napintas ngamin.
It's beautiful (to me).
(I don't care what you think)

NOTE: Gapu (ta) is the neutral word for because and the formal and literary counterpart of ngamin.

=== ngarud ===
- Used to express a result, i.e., then, so; or an affirmation, indeed.

Intan ngaruden.
Well, let's go then

Nagpudoten ti balay. Ilukatmo ti ridaw ngarud.
The house is so warm. Go ahead and open the door.

Notice the use of -(e)n for emphasis.

- Change of decision.

Saanko kayat mapan idiay sine, ngem awan met ti aramidek ditoy balay. Intan ngarud.
I don't want to go to the movies, but I don't have anything to do here at home. So let's go.

- Adverbial phrases

into ngarud no if, in case that
anansa ngarud therefore, wherefore

=== ngata ===
Probability

- Used mostly in questions to solicit the opinion of the listener as the speaker is uncertain.

Nangabak ngata ni Juan?
Do you think Juan won?

- In negative statements, likewise, expresses the uncertainty of the speaker.

Saan ngata a nangabak ni Juan.
Juan probably didn't win.

- In positive statements, expresses the speaker's speculation.

Napanda ngata binisita ni adingda a masakit.
They might have visited their younger sister who's sick.

=== ngay ===
Elicitation

Used in questions when the speaker encourages the listener for a response.

Ania ngay nabuyam idiay sine idi rabii?
What did you watch at the Movie Theater last night? (It's because I want to know. Please, tell me.)

=== pay ===
- Pay can be considered the opposite to -(e)n. It has the meaning of continuation, whereas -(e)n denotes punctuality. Whereas, some particles can co-occur within the same phrase, pay and -(e)n are mutually exclusive.

Matmaturog pay ni manong.
Older brother is still sleeping.

Contrast with...

Matmaturogen ni manong.
Older brother is already sleeping.

Other examples:

Ania ti orasnan? Alas dos pay.
What time is it now? It's still two o'clock.

Adda ni Peping idiay tindaan? Awan pay.
Is Pepe at the store? He's not there yet.

- Meaning of more, in addition to

Kinumbidak ti sangapulo nga estudiante, ket upatto pay ti umay.
I invited ten students, but there will be 4 more to come.

Ad-adu pay a libro ti nabasak.
I read more books (than you). I read even more books (on top of the ones that I've read).  

Sinuratak ni nanangko, manangko ken dagiti kaanakak pay.
I wrote my mother, my sister and even my nieces and nephews.

=== piman ===
Used to express pity.

Piman, saan a nangabak ni Juan.
Juan didn't win, what a pity.

=== uray ===
Used when the facts are disregarded, akin to: even (if), although, nevertheless.

Uray saan a nangabak ni Juan, naasikasuanda ti TV.
Even if Juan did not win, he got attention from TV.
