= Ilocano grammar =

Rules of word and sentence formation in the Philippine language

Ilocano grammar is the study of the morphological and syntactic structures of the Ilocano language, a language spoken in the northern Philippines by ethnic Ilocanos and Ilocano communities in other parts of the Philippines, especially in Mindanao and overseas such as the United States, Canada, Australia, the Middle East and other parts of the world.

Ilocano is an agglutinative language. This agglutinating characteristic is most apparent in its verbal morphology, which has a Philippine-type voice system.

== Determiners ==
Ilocano has two subsets of determiners. Articles are similar to "the" and "a" or "an" in English. Demonstratives point out something ("this" or "that"), whether what is being referred to is in space, in time or is something previously mentioned.

Ilocano determiners have only two forms (core and oblique) — unlike Ilocano pronouns, which have three distinct forms: absolutive, ergative and oblique. The core form may function for either the absolutive or ergative cases.

=== Articles ===
Ilocano has two sets of articles, common and personal. Personal articles are used for people, names, and personal titles. Common articles are used with all other nouns (including names of countries and cities).

Common
Case	Singular	Plural
Core	ti (Note: The short forms of the singular demonstratives may be used in place of ti if the speaker would like to be more specific in regards to space or time.)	dagiti
Oblique	iti	kadagiti

Personal
Case	Singular	Plural
Core	ni	da
Oblique	ken ni	kada

Kinship terms such as "mother" or "uncle" can take either set of articles. Preceded by the common article, the term is more generalized or conceptual; preceded by a personal article, the reference is more specific (the speaker refers to a member of his or her family or a specific antecedent).

Napan ti ama idiay eskuelaan ti anakna.
The father went to his child's school.

Napan ni ama idiay eskuelaan ni kabsat.
Father went to sister's/brother's school.

The same can also be said of titles or offices.

Nakitak ni maestra idiay padaya.
I saw teacher at the party.
(referring to the speaker's teacher in school)

Nakakitaak iti maestra idiay padaya.
I saw a teacher at the party.
(any teacher)

=== Demonstratives ===
Similar to articles, demonstratives has two forms (core and oblique) and two numbers (singular and plural). Like Spanish or Japanese, Ilokano has a three-way distinction regarding space. In addition, Ilokano has another set, which refers to objects or events not visible to either the speaker or the listener and occurred or existed before the current time frame. Therefore, Ilokano demonstratives have a five-way distinction relative to time and space.

Demonstratives are linked to their noun (or noun phrases) with the ligature a/nga.

Daytoy a lalaki
This man

Lalaki a daytoy
This man (here)
(with more emphasis on his spatial relation to the speaker)

Daytoy a dakkel a balay
This big house

Dagita nga immay nga ubbing
Those children who came

The forms in parentheses below do not require a ligature and act as an article. they may not follow their nouns as the full forms.

Ta lalaki
That man
("Lalaki 'ta" does not occur, since "ta" is contraction of "dayta" which mean "that.")

Examples:

Nagtagtagainepak iti daydi apong.
I dreamt of grandmother.
(Grandmother has died.)

Nabirukam 'tay kuartam?
Did you find your money?

==== Spatial ====
Ilocano distinguishes the following levels of proximity:

- Proximal: Nearer the speaker ("this")
- Medial: Nearer the listener ("that")
- Distal: Removed from both speaker and listener ("yonder")

Spatial
Number	Case	Proximal	Medial	Distal
Singular	Core	daytoy ('toy)	dayta ('ta)	daydiay ('diay)
Singular	Oblique	iti daytoy kadaytoy	iti dayta kadayta	iti daydiay kadaydiay
Plural	Core	dagitoy	dagita	dagidiay
Plural	Oblique	kadagitoy	kadagita	kadagidiay
Adverbial		itoy	ita	idiay

==== Temporal ====
This series refers to objects and events in times other than the present (as opposed to space, physical or mental). The referents may not be visible to either speaker or listener at the time of the utterance.

- Recent: Refers to things (or events) that might not be visible at the moment of speech and have occurred or existed relatively recently.
- Remote: Refers to persons who have died, things that no longer exist, events which occurred long ago and are rather vague or something referred to in the future.

Non-Visible
Number	Case	Recent	Remote
Singular	Core	daytay ('tay)	daydi ('di)
Singular	Oblique	kadaytay	kadaydi
Singular	Oblique (Common)	iti daytay	iti daydi
Singular	Oblique (Personal)	ken daytay	ken daydi
Plural	Core	dagitay	dagidi
Plural	Oblique	kadagitay	kadagidi
Adverbial		itay	idi

This series of demonstratives can be used with the future particle -(n)to if the noun will come into existence or will be used in the future.

Dagitayto annakmo ket mapanaganan iti 'Maria' ken 'Juan'.
Your (future) children will be named 'Mary' and 'John'.

Adverbial forms can set the temporal frame of the clause it introduces and usually corresponds to "when" or "before" referring to the past.

Examples:

Nagawiden ni Juan itay simmangpet ni Maria. John had already gone home when Maria arrived. (Maria had just arrived earlier today.)

Nagawiden ni Juan idi simmangpet ni Maria. John had already gone home when Maria arrived. (Someone is relating a story from a long time ago.)

=== Future ===
The demonstrative inton, intono, tono, ton is used with reference to the future (< i- + (n)to "FUT" (+ no "CONJ")). It does not share the same morphology of the other demonstratives. It is commonly found in fixed time phrases and acts adverbially. It functions to subordinate clauses referring to future time.

Examples:

intono bigat
tomorrow (lit. future morning)

intono rabii
tonight (lit. future night/evening)

intono sumaruno a tawen
next year (lit. future year)

intono sumaruno a dua a tawen
in the next two years (lit. in the future two years)

Mapan agbakasion intono dumakkel ti sueldona.
He will go on vacation when his salary increases (in the future).

== Pronouns ==
=== Personal pronouns ===
Ilocano personal pronouns distinguish three cases: absolutive, ergative and oblique. They also distinguish three numbers: singular, dual and plural.

Accent marks in the following table are not written, but given here for pronunciation purposes:

Personal Pronouns
	Absolutive		Ergative	Oblique
	Disjunctive	Enclitic (-ak) (Note: The series of absolutive enclitics is sometimes referred to as the -ak series, a name derived from the form of the first person singular.)	Enclitic (-ko) (Note: The series of ergative enclitics series is sometimes referred to as the -ko series, a name derived from the form of the first person singular.)	Disjunctive
1st person singular	siák (Note: These forms are a combination of the obsolete variant of the personal article si and the absolutive enclitic form.)	-ak (Note: When the enclitic particle -(e)n is attached, the form becomes -akon indicating that it once was -ako in the history of the language. (cf. Tagalog))	-k(o) (Note: The final o is lost when the preceding word ends in a simple vowel and when there are no following enclitics. Compare the following: Asom Your dog; Asomonto It will be your dog.) (Note: When attaching to either of the suffixes, -en or -an, the -n of the suffix is lost.)	kaniák
1st person dual	datá, sitá	-ta	-ta	kadatá
2nd person singular	siká	-ka	-m(o)	kaniam, kenká
3rd person singular	isú(na)	-Ø (Note: The 3rd person singular has no ending or form; it is inferred by context.)	-na	kaniana, kenkuána
1st person plural inclusive	datayó, sitayó	-tayó	-tayó	kaniatayo, kadatayó
1st person plural exclusive	dakamí, sikamí	-kamí	-mi	kaniami, kadakamí
2nd person plural	dakayó, sikayó	-kayó	-yo	kaniayo, kadakayó
3rd person plural	isúda	-da	-da	kaniada, kadakuáda

Notes

- First person is the only person to distinguish a dual number; it includes the speaker and one listener. If there are more people addressed (or referred to), one of the first-person-plural forms is the more appropriate form to use. Non-native speakers of Ilocano who are not familiar with this concept will tend to confuse the first-person-plural inclusive tayo with ta (the first-person dual). For example, in a situation where the speaker and the listener are leaving, a native would say "Intan", but a non-native might say "Intayon".
- First-person-plural forms encode inclusivity. Inclusive forms refer to the speaker and at least two listeners (or the listener and others). On the other hand, exclusive forms refer to the speaker and others (the listener is not included).
- Personal pronouns in the absolutive case have two forms: disjunctive and enclitic. Disjunctive (or independent) pronouns do not attach to any word, and they can stand as predicates. On the other hand, enclitic pronouns attach to the preceding word (whether a noun or a verb). When attached to a noun, they can indicate possession; to a verb, they indicate the agent of the verb.
- Oblique pronouns usually express conveyance to someone. They also mark the patient role (direct object) of verbs cast in the agent voice. Additionally, when used with nouns denoting people (for example, relatives or a personal title), they refer to that person's place of residence.

Examples of independent absolutive personal pronouns:

1) Siak ti gayyem ni Juan.
"I am Juan's friend."

2) Sikami/Dakami ti napan idiay Laoag.
"It was us who went to Laoag."

3) Sikayo/Dakayo ngay?
"What about you? (plural) "

In 1 and 2 above, siak and dakami are the only words in the "topic" slot. The rest of the sentence is the "comment". There is no copula "to be" (as in English). In 3 sikayo stands alone, as ngay (a particle) only adds to the sentence.

Examples of enclitic absolutive personal pronouns:

Gumatgatangak iti saba.
"I am buying bananas."

Agawidkayonto kadi intono Sabado?
"Are all of you going home on Saturday?"

Examples of possessive use of the enclitic personal pronouns:

Napintas ti balaymo.
"Your house is beautiful."

Ayanna daydiay asok?
"Where is my dog?"

Examples of ergative enclitic personal pronouns:

Basbasaenda ti diario.
"They are reading the newspaper."

Intedna kaniak.
"He gave it to me."

Examples of oblique personal pronouns:

Imbagam kaniana!
"You told her!"

Ibagam kadakuada.
"Tell them."

=== Enclitic personal-pronoun sequences ===
Enclitic personal-pronoun sequences occur with goal-oriented (transitive) verbs: verbs that take both a subject and object to complete its meaning. Enclitic personal pronouns may (or may not) combine when they occur in sequence, in the order of subject (in the ergative case, or -ko series) and goal (in the absolutive case, or the -ak series).

Agent	Patient							
Agent	1st Sing.	2nd Sing.	3rd Sing.	1st Dual	1st Plur. Excl.	1st Plur. Incl.	2nd Plur.	3rd Plur.
1st Singular	(Note: In situations where the agent and the patient are the same, the agent remains the same, but the patient is one of the reflexive pronouns that correspond to the agent.)	-ka	-k(o)Ø	–	–	–	-kayo	-k(o) ida
2nd Singular	-nak		-m(o)Ø	–	-nakami	–	–	-m(o) ida
3rd Singular	-nak	-naka	/-naØ	-nata	-nakami	-natayo	-nakayo	-na ida
1st Dual	–	–	-taØ		–	–	–	-ta ida
1st Plur. Excl.	–	-daka	-miØ	–		–	-dakayo	-mi ida
1st Plur. Incl.	–	–	-tayoØ	–	–		–	-tayo ida
2nd Plural	-dak	–	-yoØ	-data	-dakami	–		-yo ida
3rd Plural	-dak	-daka	-daØ	-data	-dakami	-datayo	-dakayo	/-da ida

Notes

- Third person is assumed when it is a patient. In other words, it appears as a "zero" morpheme (represented by 'Ø'). If there is a need for emphasis, isuna (an independent absolutive personal pronoun) may be used (for example, Nakitak isuna, "I saw him.")
- Ida never combines with a pronoun. Other enclitics may occur between the agent and ida (for example, Nailutuannan ida, "He cooked for them already".)
- -na appears to signal a singular (2nd or 3rd person) agent, whereas -da signals a plural agent.
- When the agent of a transitive verb is a noun phrase and its patient is a pronoun, or when the possessor is a noun phrase and the possessed is a pronoun, the combinations with the third person pronouns co-occur with the noun phrases to which they refer. (See Clitic doubling.)
- Some combinations do not exist (for example, a first-person-singular subject and a first-person-plural patient. Typically, these non-existent forms are those where the agent is among the patients.

=== Reflexive pronouns ===
Reflexive pronouns consist of the word bagi (/ba.'gi/), "body" and the appropriate ergative enclitic. (Note that the stress falls on the ultima of the word.)

Person	Form	Gloss
1st sing.	bagik	myself
2nd sing.	bagim	yourself
3rd sing.	bagina	himself herself itself
1st dual	bagita	ourselves
1st plu. inc.	bagitayo	ourselves
1st plu. ex.	bagimi	ourselves
2nd plu.	bagiyo	yourselves
3rd plu.	bagida	themselves

=== Independent possessives ===
Possessive pronouns consist of either the word bagi /'ba:.gi/ ("share") or kukua ("ownership") and the appropriate ergative enclitic. There is no difference in meaning between the two sets of forms.

Note that the stress in bagi falls on the penult, instead of the ultima (as in bagi, /ba.'gi/ above). As stress is not normally written, context will clarify which of the two types of pronouns is being used.

Person	Bagi	Kukua	Gloss
1st sing.	bagik	kukuak	mine
2nd sing.	bagim	kukuam	yours
3rd sing.	bagina	kukuana	his hers its
1st dual	bagita	kukuata	ours
1st plu. inc.	bagitayo	kukuatayo	ours
1st plu. ex.	bagimi	kukuami	ours
2nd plu.	bagiyo	kukuayo	yours
3rd plu.	bagida	kukuada	theirs

A possessive pronoun is most commonly used in lieu of the thing possessed. It answers the question "Whose is this?"

Bagimi dagidiay.
Those are ours.

Ania kadagitoy a lugan ti nadungpar? Bagida.
Which of these cars was hit? Theirs.

Husto ti pagtugawam idiay lamesa. Nangato la unay met ti kukuak.
Your chair at the table is just right. Mine is too high.

Kinnannan ti sorbetesna. Ngem, dita met pay kinnan ti bagita.
She already ate her ice cream. But, we haven't yet eaten ours (or our share).

Although use of ergative pronouns is more common, possessive pronouns can show possession as well. They precede the noun (or noun phrase) they modify, and are linked with a/nga. Using this construction adds the nuance that the noun (or noun phrase) is particular to the possessor.

Nabirokanna ti kukuana nga libro.
She found her book.
She found her own book.

Nabirokanna ti librona.
She found her book. (It could have been another girl's book she found.)

=== Indefinite Pronouns ===
Indefinite pronouns are formed with the appropriate interrogative and the particle man.

An alternate form is with uray preceding the interrogative. These forms, however, can stand alone.

Interrogative	Gloss	Indefinite w/ man	Indefinite w/ uray	Gloss
siasino	who?	siasino man, siasinoman	uray siasino	anyone, anybody, whoever
ania	what?	ania man, aniaman	uray ania	anything, whatever
kaano	when?	kaano man, kaanoman	uray kaano	anytime, whenever
inton-ano	when? (in the future)	inton-ano man, inton-anoman	uray inton-ano	anytime, whenever (in the future)
kasano	how?	kasano man, kasanoman	uray kasano	however, anyhow
sadino	where?	sadino man, sadinoman	uray sadino	wherever, anywhere

Examples:

Ania ti kayatmo? What do you want?
Uray ania. Anything.
BUT, NOT...
*Ania man.

== Nouns ==
Nouns are classed as either common or personal; personal nouns are introduced by the personal article ni. Names of people or anthropomorphized nouns are marked by ni (ni Juan, Juan). Kinship terms and titles can also be preceded by ni (ni tatang, ni kaeskuelam). They may be introduced by ti (the common article) if the speaker is making a generalization. All other nouns (the common nouns) are introduced by ti; for example, ti aso ("the dog") and ti balay ("the house").

=== Plurality ===
Ilokano has two ways to indicate plurality: the noun accompanied by a plural form of the article, or morphologically. Plurality can be indicated simply by the appropriate plural form of the article without any change in the noun, e.g. dagiti aso, "the dogs" or kadagiti balay, "(among) the houses".

To indicate the plural morphologically, the first syllable of the root is reduplicated or a consonant phoneme is geminated. This type of pluralization occurs commonly with nouns denoting people. Other nouns have a plural form which does not follow either preceding method, and must be learned individually.

Plurals formed morphologically, however, have the added nuance of distribution, e.g. babbalasang ("each/every young woman"). Neither method of pluralization is exclusive. Plural articles commonly occur with morphological plurals.

- Open-Syllable Reduplication

kayong, brother-in-law
kakayong, brothers-in-law

- Closed-Syllable Reduplication

ima, hand
im-ima, hands

- Gemination

ubing, child
ubbing, children

lalaki, male
lallaki, males

== Adjectives ==
=== Root adjectives ===
Root adjectives do not have any of the common derivational affixes such as a-, ma-, na- or any other derivational affix. Many root adjectives denote physical characteristics (especially physical abnormalities).

Example
bassit  small
dakkel  big
baro    new
daan    old (applied to inanimate objects)
baket   old (applied to animate females)
lakay   old (applied to animate males)
buttiog pot-bellied (applied to men)
tuleng  deaf
pangkis cross-eyed/cock-eyed

=== Derived adjectives ===
- Na-

The most common prefix for deriving adjectives. The na- prefix denotes the descriptive quality of the root.

Root	Gloss	Adjective	Gloss
alsem	sourness, acidity	naalsem	sour, acid
gasang	spice, spiciness, heat	nagasang	spicy, hot (taste)
pait	bile, bitterness	napait	bitter, acrid
uyong	severity, harshness	nauyong	harsh, mean, severe

- Ma-

Some roots have a derived adjective form that begins with ma-; a number have derived adjectives in both ma- and na-. The chief difference is that ma- prefix denotes a condition or an experience.

Root	Gloss	na-	ma-
sakit	sickness, pain, disease	nasakit painful	masakit ill, sick
lam-ek	chill	nalam-ek cold (weather)	malam-ek to be, feel cold
ulaw	dizziness, nausea	–	maulaw to be, feel dizzy

- A-

A fixed number of roots begin with a-, an archaic prefix which is no longer productive (e.g. atiddog, "long"; as a result, the prefix no longer has a meaning of its own.

Root	Gloss	Adjective	Gloss
tiddog	length	atiddog	long
baba	lower part	ababa	short (height)

=== Adjectival degrees and forms ===
Positive

The positive form is the "dictionary" form (or plain form) from which the other degrees can be derived.

Comparative

The comparative form of adjectives is used when comparing at least two nouns, where one has more of the characteristic denoted by the adjective. The comparative form is derived by reduplicating the first syllable of the root; for example, 'naud-udi, "(the) later (one in a sequence) < naudi, "last" < udi "rear".

Moderate

The moderate form of an adjective denotes that what is being described has some degree of quality. In English, this is expressed by "rather" or "somewhat". The moderate degree is formed by prefixing paN- and suffixing -en to the root. The final -N is the organic nasal of the first consonant of the root (which is lost in the case of stops).

Comparative superlative

The superlative is the form that is used when something has the greatest degree of a characteristic, in comparison to other items. It is formed by prefixing ka- and suffixing -an to the root.

Absolute superlative

The intensive degree denotes that what it being described is the epitome of the adjective's meaning. A near parallelism is the use of -ísimo/a in Spanish or -issimo/a in Italian.

The prefix naka- is added with the reduplication of the first three phonetic segments of the root (e.g. nakabakbaknang, "very wealthy, rich".

Excessive

The excessive is used to denote that the quality of the adjective is extreme. This degree is formed using the adverb unay with the positive form of the adjective (e.g. nabaknang unay "too, extremely, overly wealthy, rich".

Intensive

This form corresponds to the use of "how" or "so" in English in a phrases of wonder, admiration or surprise. The intensive is formed by prefixing nag- to the root (for example, nagbaknang "very wealthy" < baknang "wealth, riches". Commonly, the intensive is accompanied by the enclitic -(e)n, e.g. Nagbaknangen ni Maria "Maria's very rich!"

Root: pudot "warmth"
Degree	Form	Gloss
Positive	napudot	warm
Comparative	napudpudot	warmer
Moderate	pamudoten	rather warm
Comparative Superlative	kapudotan	warmest
Absolutive Superlative	nakapudpudot	very warm
Excessive	napudot unay	too warm
Intensive	nagpudoten	so warm! how warm!

== Verbs ==
Although other word classes in Ilokano are not diverse in forms, verbs are morphologically complex inflecting for grammatical distinctions such as tense/aspect, number and focus.

Ilokano has a morphosyntactic alignment that shares characteristics of both Nominative–accusative and Ergative–absolutive known as the Austronesian alignment.

== Adverbs ==
=== Demonstrative adverbs ===
Demonstrative adverbs are similar to demonstrative adjectives and pronouns. Each series uses spatial reference, and shows the same degrees of proximity: proximal, medial and distal.

=== Locatives ===
Locatives correspond to "here" and "there". They have a three-way distinction similar to the demonstratives: proximal, medial and distal, and can be used with nouns to specify location. In addition, they can replace a noun phrase in the oblique case which concerns location.

Locative determiners
Space	Form	Gloss
Proximal	ditoy	here
Medial	dita	there
Distal	idiay sadiay	there or yonder

Examples:

Immay ditoy balay.
He came to our house (here).

Napan dita a balay.
He went to that house (just over there).
He went to the house.

Napan idiay.
He went there.(referring to a far place)

=== Manner ===
Ilocano has a set of adverbs referring to manner. They are a combination of kas ("like/as") and the abbreviated determiner forms toy, ta and diay.

Locative determiners
Space	Form	Gloss
Proximal	kastoy	like this, this way
Medial	kasta	like that, that way
Distal	kasdiay	like that, that way

Examples:

Kinitak a kastoy.
I looked at him like this.

Apay sinuratmo a kasta?
Why did you write it that way?

Nagsala a kasdiay.
She danced like that (over there, like she is dancing).

As with many word categories in Ilocano, prefixing ag- (a verbalizing prefix) results in verbs expressing the generality of the action (possibly accompanied by an imitating gesture).

Examples:

Nagkastoy.
He went like this/He did this.

Agkasta kunana.
She said that she would go like that/do that.

Nagkasdiayak.
I went like that/do that (over there) (pointing to someone who is in the midst of the action in question).

Adding pa- (a directional prefix), direction is implied.

Examples:

Nagpakastoy.
He went/came here. He went/came through here.

Agpakasta kunana.
She said that she would go/come there. She said she would go/come through there.

Nagpakasdiayak.
I went/came (over) there. I went/came through (over) there.

== Numbers ==
Ilocano has two number systems: one native and the other derived from Spanish. The systems are used interchangeably; however, the situation can dictate which system is preferred. Typically, Ilocanos use native numbers for one through ten and Spanish numbers for amounts of ten and higher. Time is told using the Spanish system and numbers for hours and minutes; for example, alas dos (two o'clock). For dates, cardinal Spanish numbers are the norm; for example, 12 (dose) ti Julio (the twelfth of July).

== Typology ==
Ilocano employs a predicate-initial structure: verbs and adjectives occur in the first position of the sentence, then the rest of the sentence follows.

== Verb phrases ==
=== Comment-topic ===
Comment-topic sentences in Ilokano, similar to other Philippine languages such as Tagalog, are defined by a generalized usage and lack of verb. Comment-topic sentences are used commonly to make relational statements between or about one or more "topics," or to make generalized statements. This sentence construction relies on the common and personal articles to indicate topic or non-topic information. The most basic formula for Comment-topic sentences can be seen as follows:

"Adjective" + "topic marker" + "Topic"

Napintas ni Ana.
Ana is beautiful.

Napintas da Ana ken Tina.
Ana and Tina are beautiful.

ni and da can also be used to introduce titles of people.

Baknang ni Mayor Gonzales.
Mayor Gonzales is rich.

Nalaing nga duktor da Dr. Jose ken Dra. Regina.
Dr. Jose and Dra. Regina are smart doctors.

Examples using the common or "topic non-name" articles:

Nabanglo ti sabong.
The flower is fragrant.

Sadot ti lalaki.
The man is lazy.

Delikado dagiti lamok.
The mosquitos are dangerous.

Nagaget dagiti estudiante.
The students are diligent.

Note in the examples above that the statements are translated with is/are, but do not use or require a verb or existential to be grammatically correct.

== Existentials ==
Two existential particles, adda and awan, are used in Ilokano to express modes of possession and existence. While adda is used as either an absolute or current existential, awan is used as a negative existential.

=== Adda ===
Adda can indicate absolute possession, which signifies that the possessor owns the possessed object regardless of whether or not the object is with him at the moment.

Adda kadi kotsem?
Do you have a car?

Adda kadi asawamon?
Do you have a spouse already?

It can also indicate current possession, meaning that the possessed object is within reach of its owner. This requires the possessor to be in the oblique case (e.g. kaniák).

Adda ti tulbek kaniak.
I have the key (on me now).

For emphasis, possessors may also precede the possessed objects.

Adda kaniak ti tulbek.
I (am the one) who has the key.

Adda can combine with the spatial demonstrative adverbs to produce addadtoy, "is/are here"; addadta, "is/are there" and addadiay, "is/are there (yonder)".

=== Awan ===
Awan is used as the negative of adda.

Awan ti luganko.
I don't have a car.

Awan ti aso ni Maria.
Maria does not have a dog.

Awan kaniak.
I don't have it.

=== Indefinite phrases ===
Indefinite phrases (phrases including words such as "someone", "somebody" or "something") are introduced by adda. If the indefinite phrase is the actor, the intransitive form of the verb is used; if the indefinite is the goal (or patient) of the verb, a goal-focused form of the verb is used.

Adda ti immay. (Actor)
Someone came. (lit. "There is (someone) who came.")

Adda ti pinatayda. (Goal)
They killed somebody. (lit. "There is (someone) who was killed by them.")

Adda ti linabaak idi kalman. (Goal)
I washed something yesterday. (lit. "There is (something) that I washed yesterday.")

Whereas adda is used for indefinite phrases, awan is used for negative phrases, e.g. "nobody came", "no one is here".

Awan ti immay
No one came.

Awan ti pinatayda.
They killed nobody.

Awan ti linabaak idi kalman.
I washed nothing yesterday.

The double negative in English (where the above examples are "no one didn't come", "they didn't kill nobody" and "I didn't wash nothing yesterday") is common in colloquial speech. In other languages such as in Romance languages, it is mandatory. In Ilocano, however, the use of the negative saan or di in conjunction with awan results in something absolute.

Awan ti saan nga immay.
There isn't anybody who didn't come. (i.e. "Everyone came.")

Awan ti saanda a pinatay.
There wasn't anybody that they didn't kill. (i.e. "They killed everyone.")

Awan ti saanko a linabaan idi kalman.
There isn't anything I didn't wash. (i.e. "I washed everything.")

== Negation ==
=== Saan/Di ===
Saan (and its variant, haan) and di (no, not) occupy the predicate slot of phrases in which they occur. As a result, personal pronouns and other enclitics will bind to it instead of the word or phrase that saan or di negates. The combination of the ergative first person pronoun (i.e. ko) does not combine with di in the expected *diko. Instead, diak is used. Saan requires the use of the ligature a/nga with verbal predicates; di does not.

Examples:

Verb predicate
+ Napanak idiay tiendaan. (I went to the store.)
– Saanak a napan idiay tiendaan. (I did not go to the store.)
– Diak napan idiay tiendaan.

Noun predicate
+ Estudianteka. (You are a student.)
– Saanka nga estudiante. (You are not a student.)

Adjective predicate
+ Nalaingak. (I am intelligent.)
– Saanak a nalaing. (I am not intelligent.)

== Interrogatives ==
Interrogative words are always the first constituents of a sentence or phrase.

=== Simple ===
The following table contains common simple interrogatives:

Interrogative	Gloss	Notes
Ania	What?	
Apay	Why?	
Asino Sino; Sinno	Who?	
Siasino	Who?	Plural
Ayan	Where?	Used when inquiring about a place
Sadino	Where?	Used when inquiring where an action is performed
Inton-ano	When?	Used when inquiring about a time in the future
Kaano	When?	Used when inquiring about a present or past time
Kasano	How?	
Sagmamano	How much?	Used when inquiring about a price
Mano	How many?/How much?	

- Asino, sino, sinno, siasino

There are no differences between these; siasino, however, can denote pluratity.

- Ayan and sadino

Ayan is used when inquiring the location of something; for example, Ayan ti tulbekko? "Where are my keys?" Sadino, on the other hand, is used in conjunction with verbs, e.g. Sadino ti papanam? "Where are you going?".

- Inton-ano and kaano

Inton-ano is used when inquiring about a time in the future, kaano about a past or present time. Compare the following examples:

Inton-ano ti misa? (When is the mass? When will the mass be?)
Kaano ti misa? (When is the mass?)
Kaano daydi misa? (When was that mass? Note how the use of daydi adds emphasis on the past)

=== Locative ===
In addition to the locative interrogatives, Ayan? and Sadino, the locative form of the verb can be used alone with a change in intonation.

Examples:

Panganam?
Where are you eating?

Nangalaanyo?
Where did you get it?

=== Complex ===
Complex interrogatives have the characteristic -ano appended. The following are a few which occur (or are possible):

Interrogative	Gloss	Notes
Agpaano?	In which direction? To where?	ag-, pa- (directional morpheme) and -ano
Maikamano?	In what order?	maika- (ordinal prefix) and mano (how much, many?)
Mamin-ano?	How many times?	mamin- (multiplicative prefix) and -ano
Taga-ano?	From where?	taga- (prefix of origin) and -ano
Kapin-ano?	How related?	kapin- (prefix of kinship relation) and -ano

Examples:

Agpaanoka? (Where are you going to? Which way are you going?)
Taga-anoda? (Where are they from?)
Kapin-ano isuna? (How is he related?)

== See also ==
- Ilocano language
- Languages of the Philippines
