= Philippine Negrito languages =

Languages of the Negrito peoples of the Philippines

The Negrito peoples of the Philippines speak various Philippine languages. They have more in common with neighboring languages than with each other, and are listed here merely as an aid to identification.

== Classification ==
The following languages are grouped according to their geographic location, and not genetic classification.

=== Lobel (2013) ===
Lobel (2013) lists the following Black Filipino (i.e., Philippine Negrito) ethnolinguistic groups.

Northern Luzon

- Umiray Dumaget
- Remontado/Hatang-Kayi
- Alta, Northern
- Alta, Southern
- Arta
- Casiguran Agta
- Nagtipunan Agta
- Dinapigue Agta
- Central Cagayan Agta
- Pahanan Agta (distinct from Paranan, which is not spoken by a Negrito Filipino population)
- Dupaningan Agta
- Atta (3–4 languages)

(Lobel (2010) lists the following Negrito languages that are spoken on the eastern coast of Luzon Island, listed from north to south.)

- Dupaningan Agta (Northern Luzon branch)
- Pahanan Agta
- Casiguran Agta
- Umiray Dumaget
- Remontado/Hatang-Kayi
- Inagta Alabat
- Manide
- Inagta Partido
- Inagta Rinconada

Furthermore, Robinson & Lobel (2013) argue that Dupaningan Agta, Pahanan Agta, Casiguran Agta, Nagtipunan Agta, Dinapigue Agta, and Paranan do not belong to the Northern Cordilleran branch, but rather a new branch that they call Northeastern Luzon, which they consider to be a primary branch of the Northern Luzon (Cordilleran) group.

Zambales Mountains

- Ayta Mag-indi
- Ayta Mag-anchi
- Ayta Abellen
- Ayta Ambala
- Ayta Bataan (a.k.a. Ayta Magbukun)

Southern Luzon

- Inagta Rinconada
- Inagta Partido
- Manide
- Inagta Alabat (and Inagta Lopez)

Southern Philippines

- Inata (possibly 2 dialects)
- Inati (Inete) (2 dialects)
- Mamanwa
- Batak (5–8 dialects)
- Iraya (Mangyan)
- Ata/Tigwa/Matigsalug Manobo

Extinct varieties

- Mount Iraya Agta (a.k.a. East Lake Buhi Agta)
- Dicamay Agta: spoken on the Dicamay River on the western side of the Sierra Madre near Jones, Isabela; reportedly exterminated by Ilokano homesteaders sometime between 1957 and 1974
- Villa Viciosa Agta

Ethnologue adds the extinct and unclassified Katabaga of Catanauan, Quezon, southern Luzon. The language was originally listed by Garvan. Katabaga is in fact a misspelling of Katabangan, the name that the people use to refer to themselves. Some people in the Bikol Region also use the term Katabangan to refer to mixed-blood Agta in the region. Lobel reports from a 2006 visit that the Katabangan speak only Tagalog. According to Lobel (2013), based on their location, if the Katabangan did in fact once have their own language, it may have been related to Inagta Alabat-Lopez (see Inagta Alabat language) and Manide. Louward Allen Zubiri reports that there are 670 individuals in the Katabangan community, and that there are also families living in Mulanay, Gumaca, Lopez, and Alabat. He also reports on a handful of vocabulary items remembered by the Katabangan which offer evidence for a close relationship of their now-lost language with Manide and Inagta Alabat.

=== Reid (1994) ===
Reid (1994) lists the following Negrito languages.

- North Agta
  - Northern Cagayan
  - Central Cagayan
  - Eastern Cagayan
  - Southern Cagayan
  - Southern Isabela
  - Aurora
- Arta 12 remaining speakers in Aglipay, Quirino, in 1990
- Alta
  - North Alta – spoken in Aurora Province
  - South Alta (Kabuluen) – spoken in Nueva Ecija and Bulacan Provinces
- Central Agta – spoken in eastern Luzon; includes Umiray
- South Agta (> Manide)
  - Camarines Norte (> Manide)
  - Camarines Sur (> Inagta Rinconada, Inagta Partido)
- Sinauna (> Remontado/Hatang-Kayi)
- Ayta – 6 different languages spoken in the Zambales Mountains according to Wimbish (1986):
  - Abelen
  - Aberlen
  - Magganchi
  - Maggindi
  - Ambala
  - Magbeken Ayta

Other Philippine Negrito languages

- Ata Manobo – spoken in Mansalinao, Davao
- Batak – spoken in Palawan
- Inati
- Mamanwa – spoken in Agusan

=== Reid (2013) ===
Reid (2013) considers the Philippine Negrito languages (highlighted in bold) to have split in the following fashion. Reid (2013) considers each Negrito language or group to be a first-order split in its respective branch, with Inati and Manide–Alabat as first-order subgroups of Malayo-Polynesian.

- Malayo-Polynesian (MP)
  - diverse MP branches outside of the Philippines
  - Bashiic, Kalamianic and other MP branches on the Philippines not comprising Negrito languages
  - **Manide–Alabat**
  - **Inati**
  - Northern Luzon languages
    - **Arta**
    - **Umiray Dumaget** (?)
    - **Northeastern Luzon languages**
    - Cagayan Valley languages
    - Ilokano
    - Meso-Cordilleran languages
      - **North Alta**
      - **South Alta**
      - South Cordilleran languages
      - Central Cordilleran languages
  - Central Luzon languages
    - **Remontado Dumagat** (**Sinauna Tagalog**)
    - Kapampangan
    - Sambalic languages
      - **Ayta languages**
      - Sambal languages
  - Central Philippine languages
    - **Mamanwa**
    - Tagalog
    - Bikol
    - Bisayan
    - Mansaka

== Unique vocabulary ==
Lobel (2010) lists the following percentage of unique vocabulary items out of 1,000 compared words in these Negrito languages, which Reid (1994) suggests are lexical remnants from the pre-Austronesian substrata that these Negrito languages may have. Manide and Umiray Dumaget have the most unique vocabulary items.

- Manide: 28.5%
- Umiray Dumaget: 23%
- Inate: 9%
- Mamanwa: 7%
- Batak: 1%
- Inagta Rinconada; Inagta Partido: 2%

Other Southeast Asian languages with high proportions of unique vocabulary of possible isolate origin include the Enggano language of Indonesia and the Kenaboi language of Malaysia.

=== Reid (1994) ===
Reid (1994) lists the following reconstructed forms as possible non-Austronesian lexical elements in Philippine Negrito languages.

No.	Gloss	Reconstructed form	Attested branches
1.	rattan	*lati	North Agta, Alta
2.	rat	*kuyəŋ	North Agta, Alta, Central Agta
3.	ashamed	*aməs	North Agta, Alta, Central Agta
4.	vein	*litid	North Agta, Alta, Central Agta
5.	bury, inter	*tapuR	North Agta, Alta, Central Agta
6.	pity, kindness	*Rəbi	North Agta, Arta, Alta
7.	snake	*babak	Alta, Central Agta, Sinauna
8.	thirst	*pələk	North Agta, Arta
9.	hunt	*purab	North Agta, Arta
10.	deer, buck	*b[ia]dut	North Agta, Arta
11.	fingernail	*[l]usip	North Agta, Arta
12.	penis	*g[ia]ləŋ	North Agta, Arta
13.	wall	*gəsəd	North Agta, Arta
14.	dog, puppy	*lapul	North Agta, Arta
15.	fire	*dukut	North Agta, Arta
16.	hair, feather	*pulug	North Agta, Arta
17.	boil (v.)	*ləbut	North Agta, Alta
18.	forget	*liksap	North Agta, Alta
19.	summit	*taltay/*taytay	North Agta, Alta
20.	forehead	*[l]aŋas	North Agta, South Agta
21.	summit	*kurut	North Agta, South Agta
22.	fragrant	*səlub	Arta, Alta
23.	buttocks	*sula	Alta, Central Agta
24.	fast	*paripari	Alta, Central Agta
25.	know (s.o.)	*abuyan	Alta, Central Agta
26.	leaf	*agid	Alta, Central Agta
27.	man, male	*patud	Alta, Central Agta
28.	see	*lawi[g]	Alta, Central Agta
29.	wall	*sagbuŋ	Alta, Central Agta
30.	shoulder	*sugbuŋ/*subuŋ(-an)	Alta, South Agta
31.	run	*kaldit	Alta, South Agta
32.	betel leaf	*li[t]lit	Alta, Ayta
33.	waterfall	*gərəy	Central Agta, Sinauna
34.	accompany	*ilan	North Alta, South Alta
35.	know	*ənul	North Alta, South Alta
36.	lazy	*b[ia]kət	North Alta, South Alta
37.	pregnant	*tuyud	North Alta, South Alta
38.	sleep	*puləd	North Alta, South Alta
39.	heavy	*dəgi	North Agta
40.	thick	*bagəl	North Agta
41.	bitter	*təkak	North Agta
42.	butterfly	*lullu/*lilli	North Agta
43.	dry in sun	*sarun	North Agta
44.	hear	*tima[n, ŋ]	North Agta
45.	hunt	*lagum	North Agta
46.	mountain	*amugud	North Agta
47.	old (obj.)	*ligid	North Agta
48.	sun	*pamalak	North Agta
49.	termite	*sarik	North Agta
50.	throw (away)	*tugbak	North Agta
51.	fingernail	*lu/*[l]udis	North Agta
52.	run	*buyut	North Agta
53.	wing	*kəpig	North Agta
54.	throw	*b[ia]sag	North Agta
55.	waterfall	*sənad	North Agta
56.	shoulder	*dapi	North Agta
57.	call	*dulaw	North Agta
58.	sweat	*asub	North Agta
59.	butterfly	*lumlum/*limlim	North Agta
60.	sit	*tugkuk	North Agta
61.	thirst	*g[ia]mtaŋ	North Agta
62.	urine	*sitəb	North Agta
63.	walk	*sugut	North Agta
64.	hear	*sanig	North Agta
65.	rattan	*karat	North Agta
66.	run	*gutuk	North Agta
67.	salt	*b[ia]gəl	North Agta
68.	afternoon	(ma-)*lutəp	Arta
69.	arrive	*digdig	Arta
70.	bone	*sagnit	Arta
71.	butterfly	*pippun	Arta
72.	drink	*tim	Arta
73.	ear	*ibəŋ	Arta
74.	lime	*ŋusu	Arta
75.	man, male	*gilaŋ(-an)	Arta
76.	mosquito	*buŋur	Arta
77.	old (man)	*dupu	Arta
78.	one	*sipaŋ	Arta
79.	rain	*punəd	Arta
80.	run	*gurugud	Arta
81.	say, tell	*bud	Arta
82.	sleep	*idəm	Arta
83.	two	*təlip	Arta
84.	burn	*təmuk	North Alta
85.	call	*ŋuk	North Alta
86.	collapse	*bəwəl	North Alta
87.	depart	*əg[ʔk]aŋ	North Alta
88.	fruit	*ian	North Alta
89.	hear	*tibəŋ	North Alta
90.	hit, strike	*pu[ʔk]na	North Alta
91.	lie down	*ədsaŋ	North Alta
92.	locust	*pəsal	North Alta
93.	long	*lə[ʔk]aw	North Alta
94.	penis	*gəyət	North Alta
95.	put, place	*dətun	North Alta
96.	red	*silit	North Alta
97.	seek	*alyuk	North Alta
98.	stand	*payuŋ	North Alta
99.	wait	*tanud	North Alta
100.	ant	*il[əu]m	South Alta
101.	black	*lit[əu]b	South Alta
102.	blow (v.)	*uswa	South Alta
103.	burn	*tiduk	South Alta
104.	bury, inter	*laba	South Alta
105.	butterfly	(ma-)*lawak	South Alta
106.	buttocks	*timuy	South Alta
107.	call	*gawi	South Alta
108.	carabao	*uduŋ(-an)	South Alta
109.	cry	*kəbi	South Alta
110.	deep	*tanaw	South Alta
111.	fall (v.)	*pagpag	South Alta
112.	fight/quarrel	*itaw	South Alta
113.	fingernail	*lunu	South Alta
114.	loincloth	*g[ia]nat	South Alta
115.	long (time)	*təwali	South Alta
116.	other (diff.)	*kalad	South Alta
117.	put, place	*bənu	South Alta
118.	rain	*dəsu	South Alta
119.	sit	*laŋad	South Alta
120.	stand	*piad	South Alta
121.	tail	*lambuŋ	South Alta
122.	three	*saŋay	South Alta
123.	tree, wood	*lab[ia]t	South Alta
124.	true	*kuduR	South Alta
125.	vagina	(i-)*plaŋ	South Alta
126.	widow, widower	(na-)*dit	South Alta
127.	wind	*kabu(-an)	South Alta
128.	bone	*kaks(-an)	Central Agta
129.	call	*ulaŋ	Central Agta
130.	climb	*dawit	Central Agta
131.	crocodile	(maŋ-)*atu	Central Agta
132.	feather	*putput	Central Agta
133.	hair	*sapuk	Central Agta
134.	hunt	*ikag	Central Agta
135.	ladle	*lukuy	Central Agta
136.	long (time)	*luy	Central Agta
137.	no, not	*eyen	Central Agta
138.	pound	*buntul	Central Agta
139.	rain	*tapuk	Central Agta
140.	run	*g[ia]kan	Central Agta
141.	sand	*laŋas	Central Agta
142.	sit	*lipa	Central Agta
143.	sleep	*pida	Central Agta
144.	stand	*[uə]di	Central Agta
145.	sweat	*aldut/*ald[ia]t	Central Agta
146.	vagina	*kin(-an)	Central Agta
147.	water, river	*urat	Central Agta
148.	white	*lapsay	Central Agta
149.	fire	*adiŋ	South Agta
150.	mosquito	*kubuŋ	South Agta
151.	shoulder	*mugmug(-an)	South Agta
152.	sleep	*lubat	South Agta
153.	child	*ubun	Sinauna
154.	leaf	*hayin	Sinauna
155.	sit	*səna	Sinauna
156.	stone	*igaŋ	Sinauna
157.	wind	*rugus	Sinauna
158.	see	*ələw	Ayta

Reid considers the endonym *ʔa(R)ta, meaning 'person', to have been a native Negrito word that was later borrowed into Austronesian with the meaning 'dark-skinned person'.
