= Comparison of orthographies of languages of the Philippines =

List of prescriptive texts on writing in languages of the Philippines

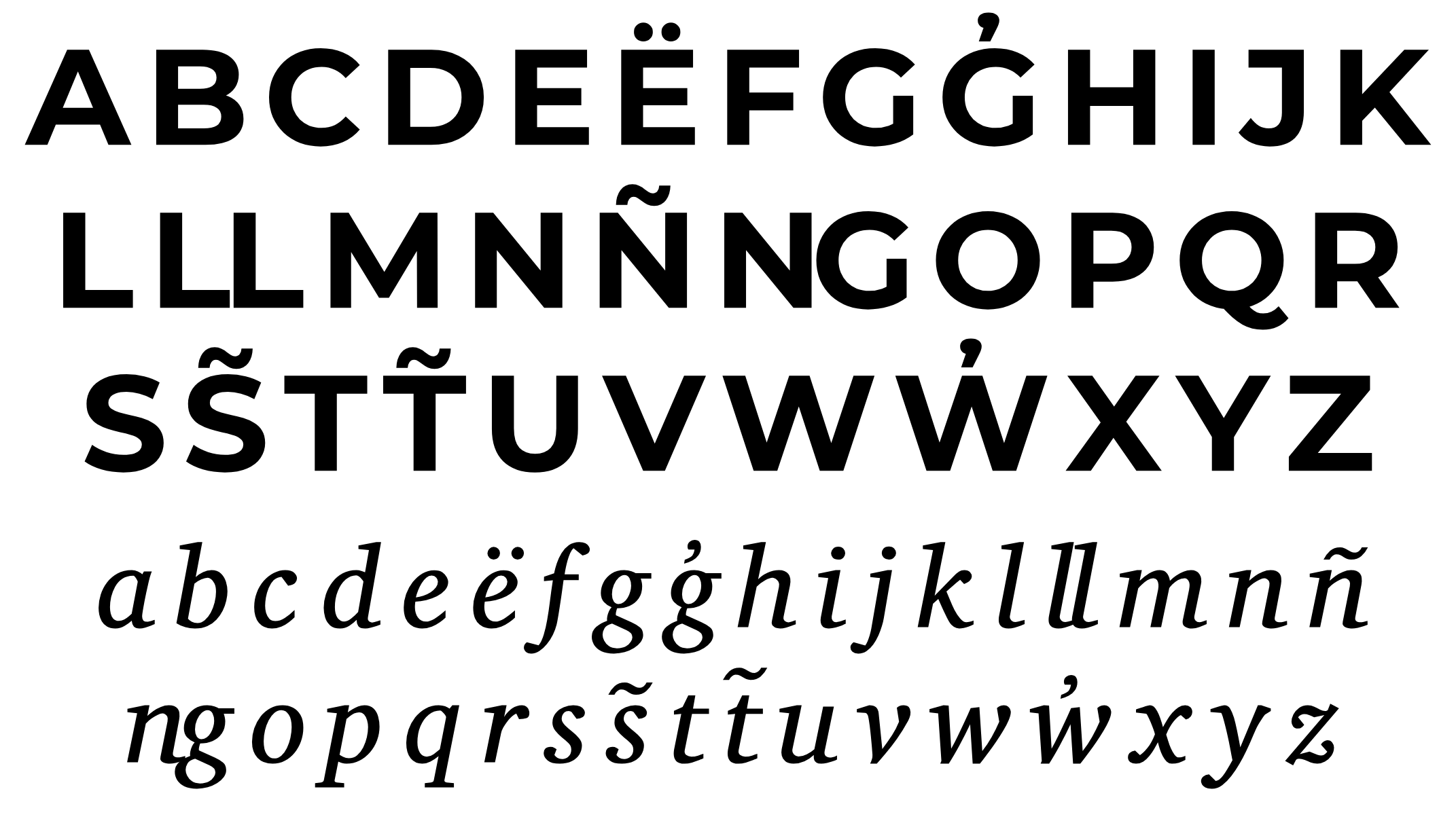
The extended Filipino alphabet as of 2024.

The Commission on the Filipino Language (Filipino: Komisyon sa Wikang Filipino) has published several standardized prescriptive orthographies for select languages of the Philippines. This article compares these orthographies.

== List of orthographies ==
Language (ISO name)	Language (listed name)	Title	Year published	In collaboration with	Filipino translation	Phoneme (IPA) chart	Phoneme-Grapheme correspondence	Wordlist	Ref.
Northern Alta	Alta	Ortograpiyang ti Alta	2024	Alta community in Diteki	Yes	Yes	Yes	Yes	
Magbukun Ayta	Ayta Magbukun	Urtugrapiya ung Ayta Magbukun	2024	Ayta Magbukun community, Department of Education Division of Bataan, Summer Institute of Linguistics Philippines	Yes	No	No	Yes	
Bikol languages (Note: page 1 states that this pertains to "Bikol Legazpi/Naga" (Central Bikol))	Bikol	Giya sa Ortograpiyang Bikol	2012	—N/a	Partial	No	No	No	
Buhi'non Bikol	Boînën (Boinen)	Ortograpiyang Boînën	2023	Department of Education Division of Camarines Sur, Purok of North Buhi, Buhi Central School, Translators Association of the Philippines	Yes	Yes	Yes	Yes	
Filipino	Filipino	Ortograpiyang Pambansa / KWF Manwal sa Masinop na Pagsulat	2014	—N/a	—N/a	No	No	No	
Eastern Bontoc (Note: Ethnologue lists 3 dialects of Eastern Bontok: Finallig, Kinajakran, and Liniyas. KWF recognizes these as separate languages with separate orthographies.)	Finallíg (Finallig)	Ortograpiyan nan Finallíg ay Kali	2026	TBD	TBD	TBD	TBD	TBD	
Gaddang	Gaddang	Ortografíya na Gaddang	2019	Department of Education Divisions of Nueva Vizcaya, Isabela, Cauayan City, Santiago City, Translators Association of the Philippines	Yes	Yes	Yes	Yes	
Eastern Subanun	G̓insëlug̓ën Sub̓anën (Ginsëlugën Subanën)	Ortograpiya në G̓insëlug̓ën Sub̓anën	2026	TBD	TBD	TBD	TBD	TBD	
Hiligaynon	Hiligaynon	Ortograpiya sang Hiligaynon	2022	West Visayas State University, Leon National High School, Hubon Manunulat	Yes	No	No	Yes	
Higaonon	Hinigaunon	Ortograpiya ha Hinigaunon	2023	Department of Education Division of Gingoog City, Cagayan de Oro, Misamis Oriental, Iligan, El Salvador City, Northern Mindanao, Translators Association of the Philippines	Yes	Yes	Yes	No	
Ibaloi	Ibalóy (Ibaloy)	Ortograpiya ni Ibalóy	2016	Department of Education Division of Benguet	Yes	No	No	No	
Ilocano	Ilokano	Tarabay iti Ortograpia ti Pagsasao nga Ilokano	2022 (1st edition: 2012)	—N/a	No	No	No	No	
Ata	Inata	Ortograpiyang Inata	2024	Ata community in Sitio Manara, Barangay Celestino Villacin, Negros Occidental	Yes	Yes	Yes	Yes	
Itawis	Itáwit (Itawit)	Ortograpiya Itáwit	2016	Department of Education Division of Cagayan Valley	Yes	No	No	No	
Kalanguya	Kalangúya (Kalanguya)	Ortograpiya ni Kalangúya	2016	Department of Education Division of Benguet	Yes	No	No	No	
Kankanaey	Kankanaëy (Kankanaey)	Ortograpiya di Kankanaëy	2016	Department of Education Division of Benguet	Yes	No	No	No	
Kapampangan	Kapampangan	Bayung Ortograpiyang Kapampangan	2016	Provincial government of Pampanga, Angeles University Foundation	Partial	No	No	No	
Eastern Bontoc	Kenachakrán (Kenachakran)	Ortograpiyan chi Kenachakrán ay Kali	2026	TBD	TBD	TBD	TBD	TBD	
Kamayo	Kinamayú (Kinamayu)	Ortograpiya na Kinamayú	2017	Department of Education Division of Surigao del Sur, Bislig City, Surigao del Sur State University – Lianga Campus, Translators Association of the Philippines	Yes	Yes	Yes	No	
Eastern Bontoc	Liniyás (Liniyas)	Ortograpiyan nan Liniyás ay Kali	2026	TBD	TBD	TBD	TBD	TBD	
Malaweg	Malawég (Malaweg)	Ortograpiya ya Malawég	2016	Department of Education Division of Cagayan Valley	Yes	No	No	No	
Pangasinan	Pangasinan	Ortograpiya na Salítan Pangasinan	2016	Pangasinan Historical and Cultural Commission	Yes	No	No	No	
Paranan	Paranan	Ortograpiya ni Paranan	2020	Department of Education Division of Isabela	Yes	No	No	Yes	
Cebuano	Sebwáno (Sebwano)	Giya sa Ortograpiyang Sinugbuánong Binisayâ (Sebwáno)	2022	University of San Carlos, Cebu Normal University, Cebu Technological University	Yes	No	No	No	
Sorsogon (Note: Both Northern and Southern Sorsogon are mentioned. Page xi states that this was written in "Katimugang Sorsogon" (Southern Sorsogon), but does not state whether it strictly applies to Southern Sorsogon.)	Sorsoganon	Ortograpiyang Sorsoganon	2024	Bicol University	Yes	No	Yes	Yes	
Tagbanwa (Note: page xi and 49 states that Tinagbanwa has three dialects: Batuwanën, Puluwanën, and S̃ug̓udnun. The stated geographic location of these three dialects encompasses Calamian Tagbanwa, although "Calamian Tagbanwa" is not specifically mentioned at all.)	Tinagbanwa	Ortograpiyang Tinagbanwa	2024	Translators Association of the Philippines, Summer Institute of Linguistics, Tagbanwa community in Coron, Palawan	Yes	Yes	Yes	Yes	
Waray	Waráy (Waray)	Ortograpiya han Waray	2018	—N/a	Yes	No	No	No	
Yogad	Yogad	Ortografiya nu Yogad	2021	Department of Education Division of Isabela, Cauayan City, various elementary & high schools	Yes	No	No	Yes	

=== Upcoming ===
Language (ISO name)	Language (listed name)	Status	Ref.
Bantoanon	Asì	Revision	
Romblomanon	Iní	Revision	
Onhan/Inonhan	Onhán	Revision	
Cotabato Manobo	Mënubù Dulángan	In the making	
Obo	Obo Manobo	In the making	
Teduray	Teduray	In the making	
Maranao	Meranaw	Confirmation	
Surigaonon	Surigaonon	Public consultation	
Western Bukidnon Manobo	Mänuvu Pulangiyän	Public consultation	
Bugkalot	Bugkalot/Eg̓ongot	Public consultation	

== Comparison ==
=== Alphabet ===
"B" indicates a borrowed letter.

Language	Aa	Bb	Cc	Dd	Ee	Ëë	Ff	Gg	G̓g̓	Hh	Ii	Jj	Kk	Ll	LLll	Mm	Nn	Ññ	NGng	Oo	Pp	Qq	Rr	Ss	S̃s̃	Tt	T̃t̃	Uu	Vv	Ww	W̓w̓	Xx	Yy	Zz
Filipino name	ey	bi	si	di	i	i patuldok	ef	ji	ji kuwit-taas	eyts	ay	jey	key	el	el ye	em	en	enye / eñe	enji	o	pi	kyu	ar	es	es tilde	ti	ti tilde	yu	vi	dobolyu	dobulyu kuwit-taas	eks	way	zi
Alta	Yes	Yes	B	Yes	Yes	Yes	B	Yes	No	Yes	Yes	B	Yes	Yes	No	Yes	Yes	B	Yes	Yes	Yes	B	Yes	Yes	No	Yes	No	Yes	B	Yes	No	B	Yes	B
Ayta Magbukun	Yes	Yes	No	Yes	No	No	No	Yes	No	Yes	Yes	No	Yes	Yes	No	Yes	Yes	No	Yes	No	Yes	No	Yes	No	No	Yes	No	Yes	No	Yes	No	No	Yes	No
Bikol	Yes	Yes	B	Yes	Yes	No	B	Yes	No	Yes	Yes	B	Yes	Yes	No	Yes	Yes	B	Yes	Yes	Yes	B	Yes	Yes	No	Yes	No	Yes	B	Yes	No	B	Yes	B
Boînën	Yes	Yes	B	Yes	B	Yes	B	Yes	Yes	B	Yes	B	Yes	Yes	No	Yes	Yes	B	Yes	Yes	Yes	B	Yes	Yes	No	Yes	No	B	B	Yes	No	B	Yes	B
Filipino	Yes	Yes	B	Yes	Yes	No	B	Yes	No	Yes	Yes	B	Yes	Yes	No	Yes	Yes	B	Yes	Yes	Yes	B	Yes	Yes	No	Yes	No	Yes	B	Yes	No	B	Yes	B
Gaddang	Yes	Yes	B	Yes	Yes	No	B	Yes	No	B	Yes	B	Yes	Yes	No	Yes	Yes	B	Yes	Yes	Yes	B	Yes	Yes	No	Yes	No	Yes	B	Yes	No	B	Yes	B
Hiligaynon	Yes	Yes	B	Yes	Yes	No	B	Yes	No	Yes	Yes	B	Yes	Yes	No	Yes	Yes	B	Yes	Yes	Yes	B	Yes	Yes	No	Yes	No	Yes	B	Yes	No	B	Yes	B
Hinigaunon	Yes	Yes	B	Yes	B	Yes	B	Yes	No	Yes	Yes	B	Yes	Yes	No	Yes	Yes	B	Yes	Yes	Yes	B	Yes	Yes	No	Yes	No	Yes	B	Yes	No	B	Yes	B
Ibalóy	Yes	Yes	B	Yes	Yes	No	Yes	Yes	No	Yes	Yes	Yes	Yes	Yes	No	Yes	Yes	B	Yes	Yes	Yes	B	Yes	Yes	No	Yes	No	Yes	Yes	Yes	No	B	Yes	B
Ilokano	Yes	Yes	B	Yes	Yes	No	B	Yes	No	Yes	Yes	B	Yes	Yes	B	Yes	Yes	B	Yes	Yes	Yes	B	Yes	Yes	No	Yes	No	Yes	B	Yes	No	B	Yes	B
Inata	Yes	Yes	B	Yes	B	No	B	Yes	No	Yes	Yes	Yes	Yes	Yes	No	Yes	Yes	B	Yes	Yes	Yes	B	Yes	Yes	No	Yes	No	Yes	B	Yes	No	B	Yes	B
Itáwit	Yes	Yes	B	Yes	Yes	No	Yes	Yes	No	Yes	Yes	Yes	Yes	Yes	No	Yes	Yes	B	Yes	Yes	Yes	B	Yes	Yes	No	Yes	No	Yes	Yes	Yes	No	B	Yes	Yes
Kalanguya	Yes	Yes	B	Yes	Yes	No	B	Yes	No	Yes	Yes	B	Yes	Yes	No	Yes	Yes	B	Yes	Yes	Yes	B	Yes	Yes	No	Yes	No	Yes	B	Yes	No	B	Yes	B
Kankanaëy	Yes	Yes	B	Yes	Yes	No	B	Yes	No	Yes	Yes	B	Yes	Yes	No	Yes	Yes	B	Yes	Yes	Yes	B	Yes	Yes	No	Yes	No	Yes	B	Yes	No	B	Yes	B
Kapampangan	Yes	Yes	B	Yes	Yes	No	B	Yes	No	B	Yes	B	Yes	Yes	No	Yes	Yes	B	Yes	Yes	Yes	B	Yes	Yes	No	Yes	No	Yes	B	Yes	No	B	Yes	B
Kinamayú	Yes	Yes	B	Yes	B	No	B	Yes	No	Yes	Yes	B	Yes	Yes	No	Yes	Yes	B	Yes	B	Yes	B	Yes	Yes	No	Yes	No	Yes	B	Yes	No	B	Yes	B
Malawég	Yes	Yes	B	Yes	Yes	No	B	Yes	No	Yes	Yes	B	Yes	Yes	No	Yes	Yes	B	Yes	Yes	Yes	B	Yes	Yes	No	Yes	No	Yes	B	Yes	No	B	Yes	B
Pangasinan	Yes	Yes	B	Yes	Yes	No	B	Yes	No	Yes	Yes	B	Yes	Yes	No	Yes	Yes	B	Yes	Yes	Yes	B	Yes	Yes	No	Yes	No	Yes	B	Yes	No	B	Yes	B
Paranan	Yes	Yes	B	Yes	Yes	No	B	Yes	No	Yes	Yes	B	Yes	Yes	No	Yes	Yes	B	Yes	Yes	Yes	B	Yes	Yes	No	Yes	No	Yes	B	Yes	No	B	Yes	B
Sebwáno	Yes	Yes	B	Yes	Yes	No	B	Yes	No	Yes	Yes	B	Yes	Yes	No	Yes	Yes	B	Yes	Yes	Yes	B	Yes	Yes	No	Yes	No	Yes	B	Yes	No	B	Yes	B
Sorsoganon	Yes	Yes	B	Yes	Yes	No	B	Yes	No	Yes	Yes	B	Yes	Yes	No	Yes	Yes	B	Yes	Yes	Yes	B	Yes	Yes	No	Yes	No	Yes	B	Yes	No	B	Yes	B
Tinagbanwa	Yes	Yes	B	Yes	B	Yes	B	Yes	Yes	B	Yes	B	Yes	Yes	No	Yes	Yes	B	Yes	B	Yes	B	Yes	Yes	Yes	Yes	Yes	Yes	B	Yes	Yes	B	Yes	B
Waray	Yes	Yes	B	Yes	Yes	No	B	Yes	No	Yes	Yes	B	Yes	Yes	No	Yes	Yes	B	Yes	Yes	Yes	B	Yes	Yes	No	Yes	No	Yes	B	Yes	No	B	Yes	B
Yogad	Yes	Yes	B	Yes	Yes	No	B	Yes	No	Yes	Yes	B	Yes	Yes	No	Yes	Yes	B	Yes	Yes	Yes	B	Yes	Yes	No	Yes	No	Yes	B	Yes	No	B	Yes	B

=== Diacritics ===
	◌́ Stressed vowel	◌̀ Glottal stop at end	◌̂ Stressed vowel and glottal stop at end	◌̈ For "Ëë" to represent /ə/	◌̄ Long vowel	◌̓	◌͡◌ For vowel clusters that have no glottal stop in between	◌̃
Filipino name	pahilís	paiwà	pakupyâ	patuldok	pahaba	kuwit-taas	arko	tilde
Combinations	á é ë́ í ó ú	à è ë̀ ì ò ù	â ê ë̂ î ô û	ë	ā ē ī ō ū	g̓ w̓	a͡a a͡i a͡o a͡ë ë͡ë i͡i o͡o a͡â a͡î a͡ô a͡ë̂ e͡ë̂ i͡î o͡ô	s̃ t̃
Alta	Yes	Yes	Yes	Yes	No	No	No	No
Ayta Magbukun	Yes	Yes	Yes	Yes	No	No	No	No
Bikol	Yes	Yes	Yes	No	No	No	No	No
Boînën	No	No	Yes	Yes	No	For "G̓g̓" to represent /ɰ/	Yes	No
Filipino	Yes	Yes	Yes	Yes	No	No	No	No
Gaddang	Yes	Yes	Yes	No	Yes	No	No	No
Hiligaynon	Yes	Yes	Yes	No	No	No	No	No
Hinigaunon	Yes	Yes	Yes	Yes	No	No	No	No
Ibaloi	Yes	No	Yes	Yes	No	No	No	No
Ilokano	Yes	No	No	No	No	No	No	No
Inata	Yes	Yes	Yes	No	No	No	No	No
Itáwit	Yes	Yes	Yes	Yes	No	No	No	No
Kalangúya	Yes	No	No	Yes	No	No	No	No
Kankanaëy	Yes	No	No	Yes	No	No	No	No
Kapampangan	Yes	Yes	Yes	No	No	No	No	No
Kinamayú	Yes	Yes	Yes	No	For "Ūū" and "Āā"	No	No	No
Malawég	Yes	Yes	Yes	No	No	No	No	No
Pangasinan	Yes	Yes	Yes	Yes	No	No	No	No
Paranan	Yes	Yes	Yes	Yes	No	No	No	No
Sebwáno	Yes	Yes	Yes	No	Yes	No	No	No
Sorsoganon	Yes	Yes	Yes	No	No	No	No	No
Tinagbanwa	Yes	No	No	Yes	No	For "G̓g̓" to denote /ɣ/ or /h/; For "W̓w̓" to denote /β̞/ or /w/	No	For "S̃s̃" to denote /tʃ/ or /s/; For "T̃t̃" to denote /t/ or /tʃ/
Waray	Yes	Yes	Yes	Yes	No	No	No	No
Yogad	Yes	Yes	Yes	No	No	No	No	No

=== Syllable structure ===
Language	V	VV	CV	VC	CVV	VVC	CVC	VCC	CCV	CCVV	CCVC	CVCC	CVVC	CVVCC	CCVCC	CCVVCC	CCVCCC
Alta	Yes	No	Yes	Yes	No	No	Yes	No	No	No	No	No	No	No	No	No	No
Ayta Magbukun	Yes	No	Yes	Yes	No	No	Yes	No	No	No	No	No	No	No	No	No	No
Bikol	Yes	No	Yes	Yes	No	No	Yes	Yes	Yes	No	Yes	No	No	No	Yes	No	Yes
Boînën	Yes	No	Yes	Yes	No	No	Yes	No	Yes	No	Yes	No	No	No	Yes	No	No
Filipino	Yes	No	Yes	Yes	No	No	Yes	Yes	Yes	No	Yes	Yes	No	No	Yes	No	Yes
Gaddang	Yes	No	Yes	Yes	No	No	Yes	No	Yes	No	Yes	No	No	No	Yes	No	Yes
Hiligaynon	Yes	No	Yes	Yes	No	No	Yes	Yes	Yes	No	Yes	Yes	No	No	Yes	No	Yes
Hinigaunon	Yes	No	Yes	Yes	No	No	Yes	No	Yes	No	Yes	Yes	No	No	Yes	No	No
Ibaloi	Yes	No	Yes	Yes	No	No	Yes	No	Yes	No	Yes	No	No	No	No	No	No
Ilokano	Yes	Yes	Yes	Yes	Yes	Yes	Yes	Yes	Yes	Yes	Yes	No	Yes	Yes	Yes	Yes	Yes
Inata	Yes	No	Yes	Yes	No	No	Yes	No	No	No	Yes	No	No	No	No	No	No
Itáwit	Yes	No	Yes	Yes	No	No	Yes	No	Yes	No	Yes	Yes	No	No	Yes	No	Yes
Kalangúya	Yes	No	Yes	Yes	No	No	Yes	No	Yes	No	Yes	No	No	No	No	No	No
Kankanaëy	Yes	No	Yes	Yes	No	No	Yes	No	Yes	No	Yes	No	No	No	No	No	No
Kapampangan	Yes	No	Yes	Yes	No	No	Yes	Yes	Yes	No	Yes	Yes	No	No	Yes	No	Yes
Kinamayú	Yes	No	Yes	Yes	No	No	Yes	No	Yes	No	Yes	Yes	No	No	Yes	No	Yes
Malawég	Yes	No	Yes	Yes	No	No	Yes	No	Yes	No	Yes	Yes	No	No	Yes	No	Yes
Pangasinan	Yes	No	Yes	Yes	No	No	Yes	Yes	Yes	No	Yes	Yes	No	No	Yes	No	Yes
Paranan	Yes	No	Yes	Yes	No	No	Yes	Yes	Yes	No	Yes	Yes	No	No	Yes	No	Yes
Sebwáno	Yes	No	Yes	Yes	No	No	Yes	No	Yes	No	No	No	No	No	No	No	No
Sorsoganon	Yes	No	Yes	Yes	No	No	Yes	Yes	Yes	No	Yes	Yes	No	No	Yes	No	Yes
Tinagbanwa	Yes	No	Yes	Yes	No	No	Yes	No	Yes	No	Yes	Yes	No	No	Yes	No	No
Waray	Yes	No	Yes	Yes	No	No	Yes	Yes	Yes	No	Yes	Yes	No	No	Yes	No	Yes
Yogad	Yes	No	Yes	Yes	No	No	Yes	No	Yes	No	Yes	No	No	No	No	No	No

== See also ==
- Filipino alphabet
