= Kasiguranin =

Austronesian language spoken in Philippines

- Native to: Philippines
- Region: Aurora, Luzon
- Native speakers: (10,000 cited 1975)
- Language family: Austronesian: Malayo-Polynesian; Philippine; Greater Central Philippine; Central Philippine; Kasiguranin–Tagalog; Kasiguranin

Language codes
- ISO 639-3: ksn
- Glottolog: kasi1256

Kasiguranin (Casiguranin) is a Tagalogic language from the Casiguran town of Aurora in the northern Philippines. It is descended from an early Tagalog dialect (i.e. particularly Tayabas dialect of Quezon) that had borrowed heavily from Northeastern Luzon Agta languages (particularly Casiguran Dumagat Agta and Paranan Agta languages), and, to a lesser extent, from Ilocano (the dominant native language of north Aurora), Bikol languages, Kapampangan, Gaddang, Itawis, Ibanag, and Paranan, which were spoken by settlers from other parts of the Philippines.

Dilasag, Dinapigue, Maconacon, and Divilacan are primarily Ilocano-speaking towns just to the north of Casiguran. Dinalungan, Dipaculao, and Maria Aurora are the other primarily Ilocano-speaking towns just south of Casiguran.

Kasiguranin speakers speak Ilocano & Tagalog as additional languages, as they are the dominant languages of Aurora.
