= Arta language =

Austronesian language spoken in the Philippines

Arta
- Native to: Philippines
- Region: northern Luzon
- Ethnicity: 150 (no date)
- Native speakers: 11 (2013)
- Language family: Austronesian: Malayo-Polynesian; Philippine?; Northern Luzon; Arta

Language codes
- ISO 639-3: atz
- Glottolog: arta1239
- ELP: Arta

Arta is a highly endangered Negrito language of the northern Philippines.

== Distribution ==
Lawrence Reid's 1990 fieldwork revealed only 12 speakers in Villa Santiago, Aglipay, Quirino Province, and in 1992 it was spoken by only three families. It is not closely related to other languages. There are still small groups of Arta speakers in Maddela and Nagtipunan towns of Quirino Province. Kimoto (2017) reports that Arta has 10 native speakers and 35–45 second-language speakers living primarily in Pulang Lupa, Kalbo, and in Dissimungal, Nagtipunan.

The Arta are found in the following places within Nagtipunan Municipality.

- Nagtipunan Municipality
  - Dissimungal Barangay
    - Purok Kalbo
    - Pulang Lupa
    - Tilitilan
  - San Ramos Barangay
  - Pongo Barangay
  - Sangbay Barangay

Arta is in contact with Casiguran Agta, Nagtipunan Agta, Yogad, Ilokano, and Tagalog.

== Phonology ==
Arta is notable for having vowel length distinction, an unusual typological feature in the Philippines.

== Sound changes ==
Kimoto (2017) lists the following sound changes from Proto-Malayo-Polynesian (PMP) to Arta. Long vowels in Arta are derived from PMP diphthongs.

PMP	Arta
*p	p
*t	t
*k	Ø ~ k
*q	Ø
*b	b
*d/*j/*z	d
*g	g
*s	s
*h	Ø
*R	r
*l	l
*m	m
*n	n
*ŋ	ŋ
*w	w
*y	y
*a	a
*i	i
*u	u
*ə	ə
*ai	eː
*au	oː

== Lexical innovations ==
Kimoto (2017) lists the following Arta lexical innovations (highlighted in bold). Lexical innovations in Casiguran Agta are also highlighted in bold.

Gloss	Arta	Casiguran Agta	Ilokano	Tagalog
excrement	sirit	**attay**	takki	taʔi
laugh	əla	**ŋihit**	katawa	tawa
banana	bagat	**biget**	saba	sagiŋ
back (body)	sapaŋ	adəg, səpaŋ	likod	likod
hair	pulug	buk	buok	buhok
body	abiː	bəgi	bagi	katawan
water	wagət	dinom	danum	tubig
house	bunbun	bilɛ	balay	bahay
male	giləŋan	ləlake	lalaki	lalaki
female	bukagan	bəbe	babae	babae

Reid (1994) lists the following reconstructed forms as possible non-Austronesian lexical elements found exclusively in Arta. Forms from Kimoto (2018) have also been included. Note the use of orthographic è [ə] and ng [ŋ].

Gloss	Pre-Arta (Reid 1994)	Arta (Reid 1994)	Arta (Kimoto 2018)
afternoon	(ma-)*lutəp	malutəp	malu:tèp
arrive	*digdig	dumigdig	digdig
bone	*sagnit	sagnit	sikrit 'small thin bones'
butterfly	*pippun	peppun	-
drink	*tim	mattim	ti:m
ear	*ibəŋ	ibəŋ	ibeng
lime	*ŋusu	ŋusú	nusu
man, male	*gilaŋ(-an)	gilaŋán	gilèngan
mosquito	*buŋur	buŋúr	bungor
old (man)	*dupu	dupú	dupu:
one	*sipaŋ	sípaŋ	si:pang
rain	*punəd	púnəd	pu:nèd
run	*gurugud	maggurugúd	gurugud
say, tell	*bud	ibud	bud
sleep	*idəm	médəm	idèm
two	*təlip	tallip	tallip

Reid (1994) lists the following reconstructed forms as possible non-Austronesian lexical elements found in both Arta and "North Agta" (i.e., various Northeastern Luzon languages spoken mostly in Cagayan Province). Forms from Kimoto (2018) have also been included.

Gloss	Reconstructed form (Reid 1994)	Arta (Reid 1994)	Arta (Kimoto 2018)
pity, kindness	*Rəbi	pagarbián	arbi
thirst	*pələk	meɁipla	iplèk
hunt	*purab	mamurab 'hunt with bow and arrow'	purab
deer, buck	*b[ia]dut	bidut	bidut
fingernail	*[l]usip	lusip	lusip
penis	*g[ia]ləŋ	giləŋ	gilèng
wall	*gəsəd	gisə́d	gisèd
dog, puppy	*lapul	lappul	lappul
fire	*dukut	dut	dut
hair, feather	*pulug	pológ	pulug

The forms *səlub 'fragrant' and *Rəbi 'pity, kindness' are found in both Arta and Alta.
