= Dumagat =

Dumagat literally means "sea-faring" or "from the sea" in Philippine languages.

Dumagat may also refer to: Philippine Naval ship BRP Dumagat (AL-57), before she was renamed BRP Sierra Madre (LT-57).

== Ethnic groups ==
- Dumagat people (also spelled Dumaget), a subgroup of Aeta people in Luzon, Philippines
- Dumagat ("sea people"), an informal term for the coastal Visayan people in Mindanao to distinguish them from inland Lumad people

== Languages ==
- Umiray Dumaget language
- Remontado Dumagat language
- Casiguran Dumagat language

== See also ==
- Dinagat (disambiguation)
