= Southern Alta language =

Austronesian language spoken in the Philippines

Southern Alta
- Kabulowan, Kabuluwan
- Native to: Philippines
- Region: Luzon
- Native speakers: (1,000 cited 1982)
- Language family: Austronesian: Malayo-Polynesian; Philippine; Northern Luzon; Meso-Cordilleran; Alta; Southern Alta

Language codes
- ISO 639-3: agy
- Glottolog: sout2905
- ELP: Southern Alta
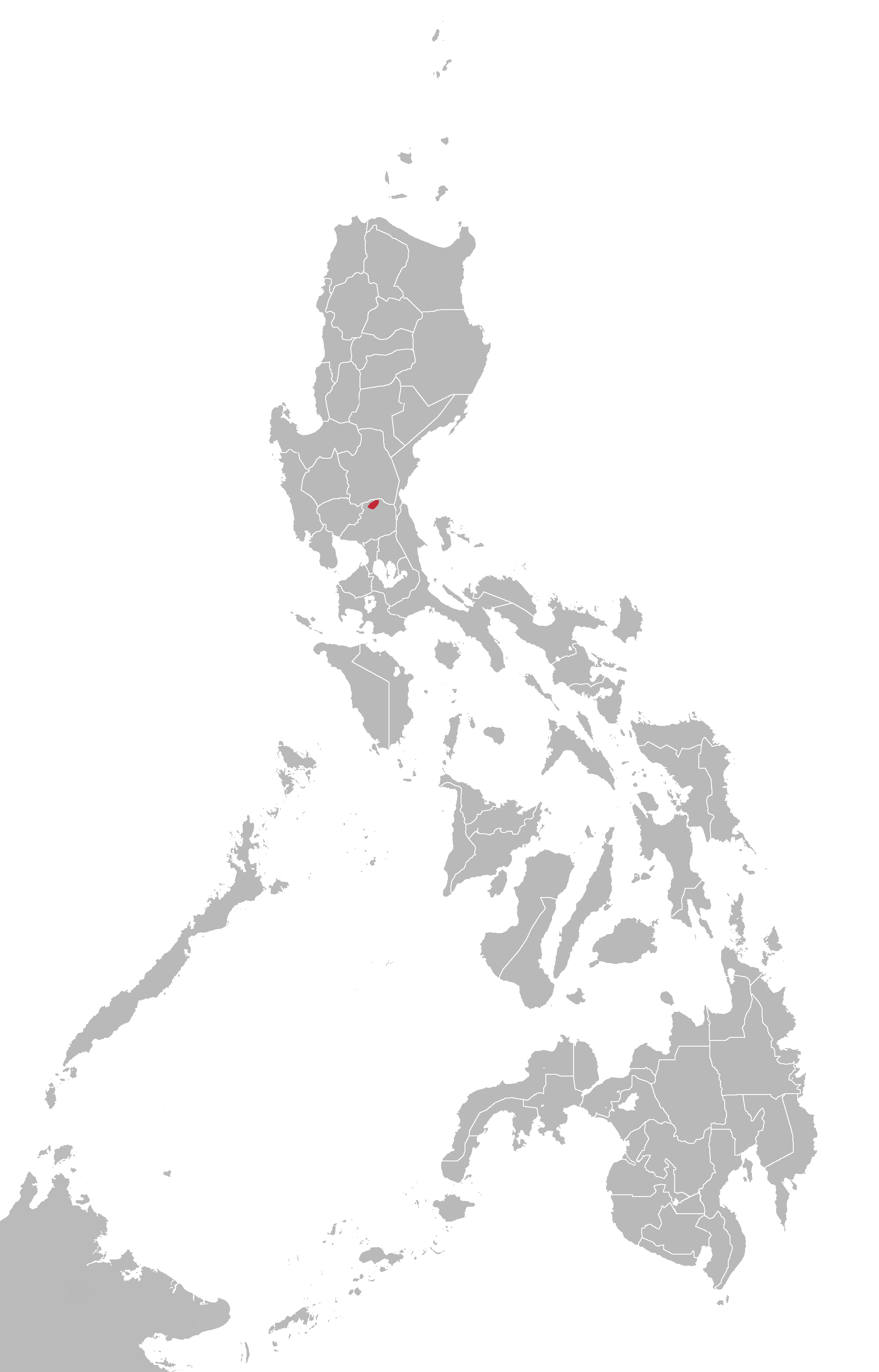
- Area where Southern Alta is spoken according to Ethnologue

Southern Alta (also known as Kabuloan Dumagat, Kabuluen, Kabulowan or Kabuluwan, Kabuluwen, Ita, Baluga, Pugot), is a distinctive Aeta language of the mountains of northern Philippines. Southern Alta is one of many endangered languages that risks being lost if it is not passed on by current speakers. Most speakers of Southern Alta also speak Tagalog.

Southern Alta is not particularly close to Northern Alta or to other languages of Luzon. Both Northern and Southern Alta have a significant proportion of vocabulary that is unique to each other, however, they are also very different from the other. Many Southern Alta also interact primarily with Tagalog speakers, sharing similarities between both languages. Tagalog is a more widely spoken language in the Philippines, using an alphabet that has five vowels and fifteen consonants. Although Southern Alta and Tagalog share similarities, Southern Alta still remains a very distinct language that constitutes at least one coordinate branch of the large Meso-Cordilleran group of Northern Luzon languages. The Southern Alta are also commonly referred to Kabuluwan, which may associate them with the Bulu, a small river flowing west past Malibay in Northern Bulacan Province.

As a critically endangered language, Southern Alta has very few speakers. Currently, Southern Alta has a population of 1,000 speakers.

== Geographic distribution ==
Southern Alta is spoken primarily in the Sierra Madre of eastern Nueva Ecija and in nearby coastal areas of Quezon Province. Lawrence Reid collected data from San Miguel, located east of Rio Chico, a barrio (barangay) of General Tinio, Nueva Ecija. There are also Southern Alta living further south near Norzagaray in Bulacan (Reid 2013: 339). A phonologically more conservative dialect is spoken by a group known as the Edimala in Dicapanikian and Dicapanisan, on the coast north of Dingalan, Aurora (Reid 2013: 339).

Abreu (2018) reported Southern Alta speakers to be living in Sitio Bato, Barangay Sapang Bulac, Doña Remedios Trinidad Municipality, Bulacan, who had been forcibly resettled from Hilltop, Norzagaray, Bulacan by the National Power Corporation (NPC). Many have intermarried with the Umiray Dumaget. There are also Southern Alta people living with the Tagalog in Sitio Tubigan, Barangay Kalawakan, Doña Remedios Trinidad Municipality, but they no longer speak the Southern Alta language.

=== History ===
Prior to 1937, no information is available on the early history of the language. The research available to date has a direct bearing problem on when and how the Philippines began speaking the language of Southern Alta.

=== Dialects ===
Southern Alta is a very distinct language; however, it shares similarities to the language Tagalog, and Northern Alta. Southern Alta may be distantly related to other Philippine languages as well. Southern Alta is most similar to Northern Alta, with a lexical similarity of 34%. Sharing those similarities can be viewed as dialect borrowing, which is borrowing sounds, grammar, or vocabulary.

=== Endangerment of the language ===
Today, Southern Alta risks becoming extinct in the near future. With only 1,000 speakers, or less, the language is categorized as critically endangered. Due to Southern Alta not being a common spoken language in the Philippines, it is likely that the language will soon be lost and will not continue to be passed down, eventually becoming a "dead language".

== Phonology ==
Consonants
	Labial	Alveolar	Palatal	Velar	Glottal
Plosive	p b	t d	(tʃ) ⟨ts⟩ (dʒ) ⟨g⟩	k g	ʔ ⟨-⟩/⟨'⟩
Fricative		s			h
Nasal	m	n		ŋ ⟨ng⟩	
Approximant	w	l, (r)	j ⟨y⟩		

- The phonemes /tʃ dʒ r/ only appear in loanwords.
- The phonemes /t d n/ are dental.
- /h/ does not appear word-finally.
- /b/ and /d/ are palatalized [bʲ dʲ] when preceding /Vk/.
- The consonants /p b t d k s m n ŋ l/ can be geminated.

Vowels
	Front	Central	Back
High	i		u
Mid	e		
Low		a	

- /u/ is in free variation with [ɔ].
- Vowels are lengthened when in a stressed syllable.

Additionally, the following diphthongs can be found: /au/, /ɔu/, /ai/, /ɔi/, /ei/.

Stress is phonemic, but unpredictable.

== Grammar ==
There is not much known about the language of Southern Alta because it is a little known language of the Philippines. The only data previously available on Southern Alta is an unpublished wordlist of 350 words collected by Wesley Petro (1974), formerly of New Tribes Mission.

== Vocabulary ==
To get a better understanding of a few words, as well as the language of Southern Alta, below is a table of words in English and how that word would be translated in Southern Alta.

Unique forms – Southern Alta.

horn	begwiʔ	warm by fire	ʔiliad
hungry	kopposan	wash clothes	taptapan
kiss	ʔo:sengan	waterfall	ta:bi
know (a fact)	ʔono:loŋkud	weep	kukbiʔ
know (a person)	ʔullupaʔan	white	puklaw
land, soil	du:pit	wide	layát
leaf	ʔa:gidna	widow	na:dit
learn	gewyan	wind	kabuán

Northern and Southern Alta are distantly related languages. Below is a table that shows similarities between words spoken in both Southern Alta (ALTS) and Northern Alta (ALTN).

Uniquely shared lexical items – Northern and Southern Alta.

Gloss	ALTS	ALTN
carry on shoulder	bitlay	bɨtlayɨn
flood	dakol	da:ʔl
friend	ko:yug	kuyug
hot (weather), fever	mopnaŋ	panaŋ14
know how	muŋnul	mannul
lost	minaybut	ʔi:but
love	ʔobbudin	budin
mud	lu:tit	lutít
night	dalam	dalam
sleep	pulád	po:lɨd
sweet	la:nis	la:nis
