= AZT (disambiguation) =

AZT (azidothymidine) or zidovudine is an antiretroviral drug used to treat HIV/AIDS.

AZT or azt may also refer to:

- Azerbaijan Time, a time zone
- Aztreonam, an antibiotic drug
- Atta language's ISO 639 code
