= Tayabasin =

Tayabasin may refer to:

- A native or inhabitant of Tayabas City in Quezon Province, Philippines.
- More broadly, a native or inhabitant of Quezon Province (old Tayabas Province), especially those with deep roots or who speak the local dialect. It also refers to the cultural and linguistic identity tied to the traditions of the former Tayabas Province. The term is commonly used for historical figures, ancestors, or earlier inhabitants of the province when it was still called Tayabas.
- Tayabas Tagalog (also called Tayabasin), a distinct Tagalog dialect mainly spoken in Quezon Province (the old Tayabas Province).
