= Dinapigue Agta =

Austronesian language spoken in the Philippines

- Native to: Philippines
- Region: Luzon
- Ethnicity: Aeta
- Language family: Austronesian: Malayo-Polynesian; Philippine; Northern Luzon; Northeastern Luzon; Dinapigue Agta

Language codes
- ISO 639-3: None (mis)
- Glottolog: None

Dinapigue Agta is a Northeastern Luzon language. It is one of the Aeta languages.
