= Dicamay Agta language =

Extinct Aeta language of the Philippines

Dicamay Agta
- Dicamay Dumagat
- Native to: Philippines
- Region: Luzon
- Ethnicity: Aeta
- Extinct: 1960s
- Language family: Austronesian: Malayo-Polynesian; Philippine; Northern Luzon; Dicamay Agta

Language codes
- ISO 639-3: duy
- Glottolog: dica1235

Dicamay Agta is an extinct Aeta language of the northern Philippines. The Dicamay Agta lived on the Dicamay River, on the western side of the Sierra Madre near Jones, Isabela. The Dicamay Agta were killed by Ilocano homesteaders sometime between 1957 and 1974 (Lobel 2013:98).

Richard Roe collected a Dicamay word list of 291 words in 1957.

== See also ==
- Human rights in the Philippines
