= General Nakar =

Municipality in Quezon, Philippines

- Municipality
- Municipality of General Nakar
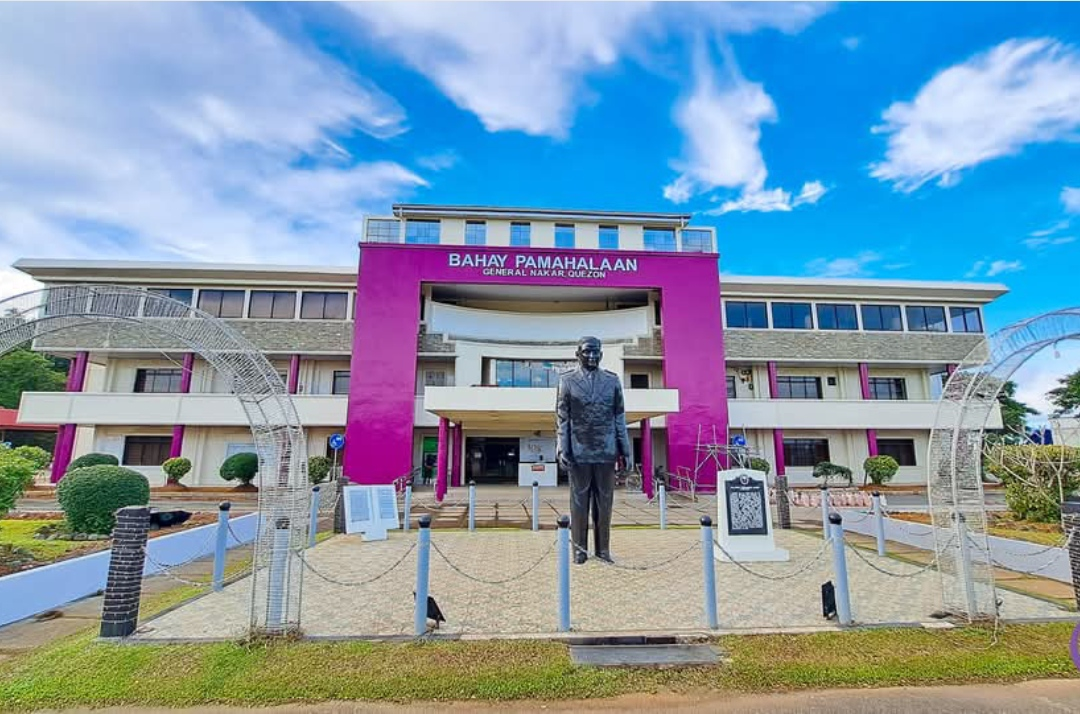
- Municipal Hall

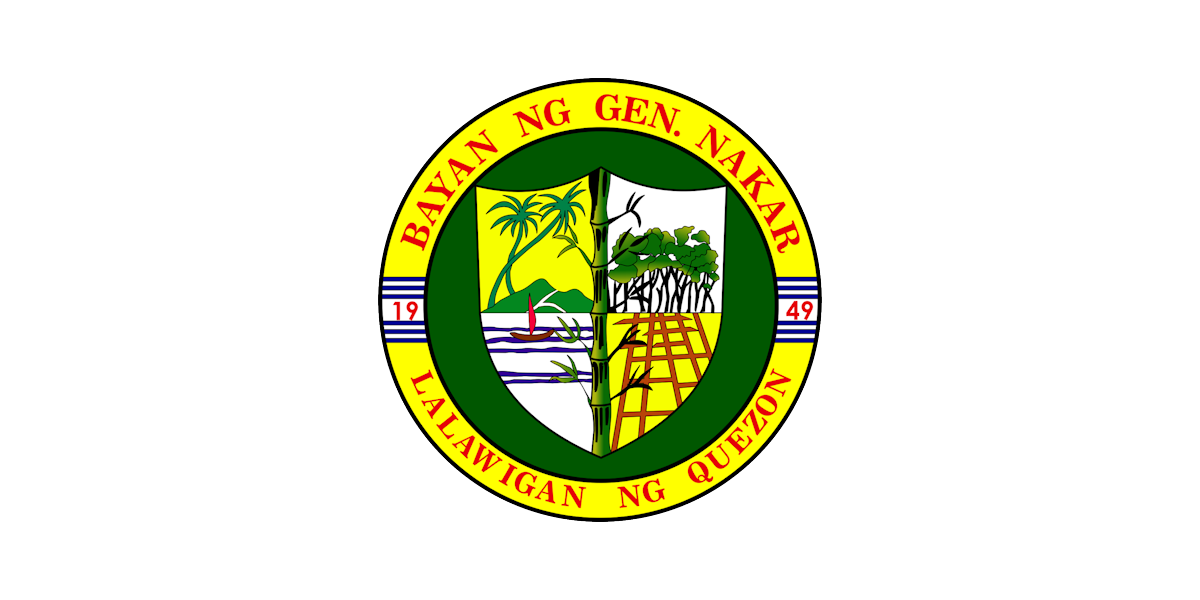
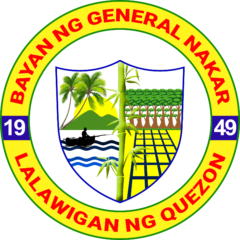
- Flag Seal
- Nickname: Ang Bayang Natural ang Ganda (Unofficial)
- Motto(s): Sa Lider Na Tapat, Lahat Ay Aangat! "With an honest leader, everyone will rise"
- Anthem: Himno Ng General Nakar ("General Nakar Hymn")
- Interactive map of General Nakar
- Location within the Philippines
- Coordinates: 14°45′47″N 121°38′06″E
- Country: Philippines
- Region: Calabarzon
- Province: Quezon
- District: 1st district
- Founded: July 21, 1949
- Named for: Guillermo Nakar
- Barangays: 19 (see Barangays)

Government
  - Type: Sangguniang Bayan
  - Mayor: Alfredo "Fred" J. Pujeda (People's Reform Party)
  - Vice Mayor: Rodel A. Avellaneda (Workers' and Peasants' Party)
  - Representative: Wilfrido Mark M. Enverga
  - Municipal Council: Members: John Rey Calzado (Independent); Nelson Sabiduria (Nacionalista Party); Hero Avellaneda (People's Reform Party); Brenda Rillion (Nacionalista Party); Aaron Astovesa (Nacionalista Party); Abegail Astejada (Nacionalista Party); Maica Joy Adornado (Workers' and Peasants' Party); Win Villareal (Nacionalista Party)
  - Electorate: 26,151 voters (2025)

Area
  - Total: 1,343.75 km^{2} (518.82 sq mi)
  - Rank: 1st
- Elevation: 234 m (768 ft)
- Highest elevation: 1,528 m (5,013 ft)
- Lowest elevation: 0 m (0 ft)

Population (2024 census)
  - Total: 34,982
  - Density: 26.033/km^{2} (67.425/sq mi)
  - Households: 8,297
- Demonym: Nakarin

Economy
  - Income class: 1st municipal income class
  - Poverty incidence: 11.8% (2023)
  - Revenue: ₱ 475.5 million (2024)
  - Assets: ₱ 1,302 million (2024)
  - Expenditure: ₱ 220.9 million (2024)
  - Liabilities: ₱ 271.3 million (2024)

Service provider
  - Electricity: Quezon 2 Electric Cooperative (QUEZELCO 2)
- Time zone: UTC+8 (PST)
- ZIP code: 4338
- PSGC: 0405617000
- IDD : area code: +63 (0)42
- Native languages: Umiray Dumaget; Hatang Kayi; Tagalog

General Nakar, officially the Municipality of General Nakar (Tagalog: Bayan ng Heneral Nakar, Ilocano: Ili ti Heneral Nakar), is a Municipality in the province of Quezon, Philippines. According to the 2024 census, it has a population of 34,982.

It was named after Major General Guillermo Peñamante Nakar (1905–1942), the martyred leader of the 1st Battalion of the 71st Infantry Division of the USAFFE against the attacking Japanese Forces and a native of Barangay Anoling.

== Etymology ==
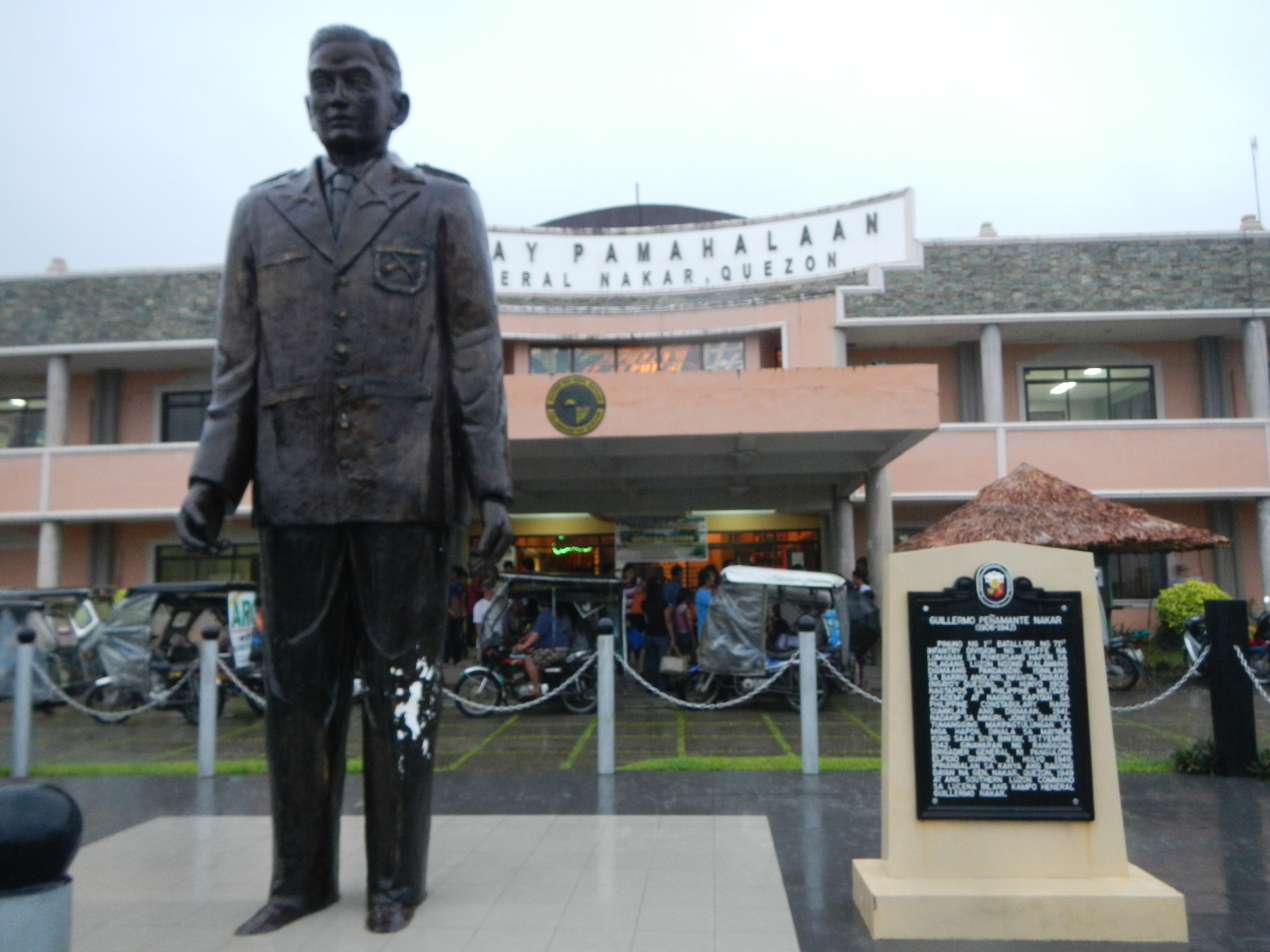
Guillermo Peñamate Nakar monument in front of the municipal hall

The municipality was named after Major General Guillermo Peñamante Nakar (1905–1942), the martyred leader of the 1st Battalion of the 71st Infantry Division of the USAFFE against the attacking Japanese Forces and a native of Barangay Anoling.

== History ==
In the late 1940s, the locals, headed by forester Julian Avellano Sr., initiated a petition to create the municipality. It came into fruition with the help of Tayabas's 1st district Representative Fortunato Suarez and Quezon Governor Gregorio Santayana.

On July 21, 1949, the barrios of Anoling, Banglos, Batangan, Magsikap, Maligaya, Minahan, Katablingan and Pamplona, then part of the municipality of Infanta, were separated and constituted into a new and separate municipality known as General Nakar, by virtue of Executive Order No. 246 signed by President Elpidio Quirino.

== Geography ==
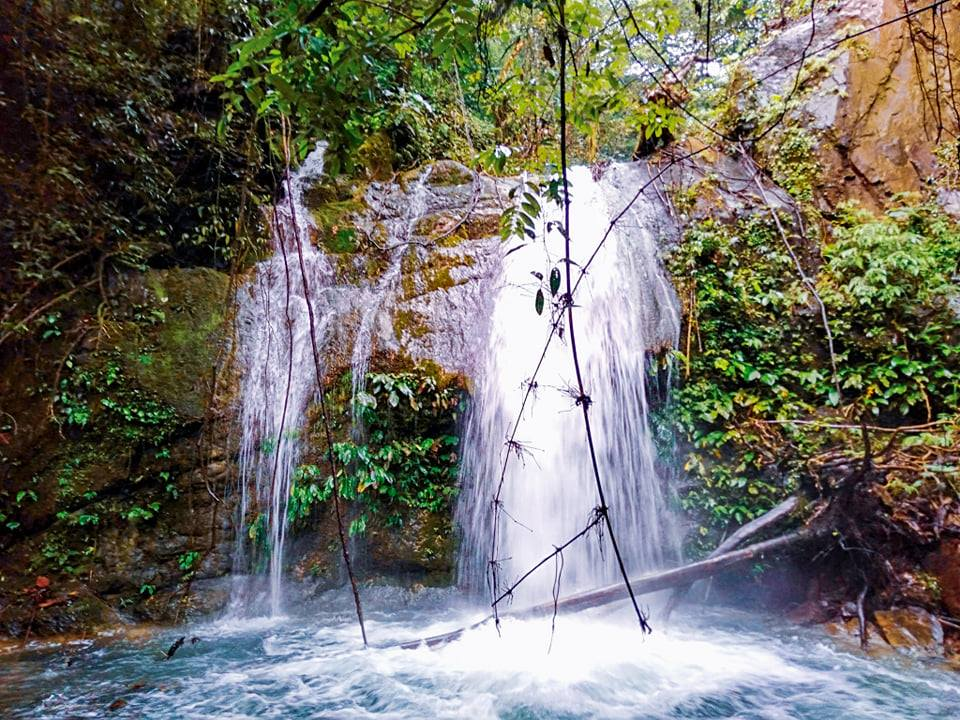
Makirapo Falls

General Nakar is the largest municipality in the province of Quezon in terms of land area, occupying 1,343.75 kilometers (834.97 mi). It is accessible by land from Metro Manila, passing through Marcos Highway (Marikina-Infanta Highway), as well as through Umiray Bridge connecting the town with Dingalan, Aurora.

General Nakar is bounded on the north by the province of Aurora, west by the provinces of Bulacan and Rizal, south by Infanta and Real, and east by the Polillo Strait, Benham Rise or Plateau, and the Philippine Sea.

=== Barangays ===
General Nakar is composed of 19 barangays, as indicated below. Each barangay consists of puroks and some have sitios.

- Anoling
- Banglos
- Batangan
- Catablingan
- Canaway
- Lumutan
- Mahabang Lalim
- Maigang
- Maligaya
- Magsikap
- Minahan Norte
- Minahan Sur
- Pagsangahan
- Pamplona
- Pisa
- Poblacion
- Sablang
- San Marcelino
- Umiray

=== Climate ===
Climate data for General Nakar, Quezon
Month	Jan	Feb	Mar	Apr	May	Jun	Jul	Aug	Sep	Oct	Nov	Dec	Year
Mean daily maximum °C (°F)	26 (79)	27 (81)	28 (82)	31 (88)	31 (88)	30 (86)	29 (84)	29 (84)	29 (84)	29 (84)	28 (82)	27 (81)	29 (84)
Mean daily minimum °C (°F)	22 (72)	22 (72)	22 (72)	23 (73)	25 (77)	25 (77)	25 (77)	25 (77)	24 (75)	24 (75)	23 (73)	22 (72)	24 (74)
Average precipitation mm (inches)	40 (1.6)	33 (1.3)	35 (1.4)	38 (1.5)	138 (5.4)	190 (7.5)	242 (9.5)	216 (8.5)	224 (8.8)	200 (7.9)	114 (4.5)	94 (3.7)	1,564 (61.6)
Average rainy days	12.2	9.0	11.0	11.7	21.5	24.0	27.2	26.1	26.8	22.3	16.3	15.1	223.2
Source: Meteoblue

== Demographics ==
Population census of General Nakar
Year	Pop.	±% p.a.
1960	5,494	—
1970	8,569	+4.54%
1975	11,751	+6.54%
1980	12,127	+0.63%
1990	18,323	+4.21%
1995	21,121	+2.70%
2000	23,678	+2.48%
2007	24,895	+0.69%
2010	25,973	+1.55%
2015	29,705	+2.59%
2020	34,225	+3.03%
2024	34,982	+0.53%
Source: Philippine Statistics Authority

== Economy ==
Poverty incidence of General Nakar (%)

Source: Philippine Statistics Authority

== Education ==
The General Nakar Schools District Office governs all educational institutions within the municipality. It oversees the management and operations of all private and public, from primary to secondary schools.

=== Primary and elementary schools ===
- Angelo Elementary School
- Batangan Elementary School
- Cablao Elementary School
- Canaway Elementary School
- Catablingan Elementary School
- Cynthia Village Elementary School
- Dadyangaw Elementary School
- Dinigman Elementary School
- Gen. Nakar Central School
- Lagmak Elementary School
- Loilo Elementary School
- Lumutan Elementary School
- Mabagkoy Elementary School
- Magsikap Elementary School
- Makalya Elementary School
- Maligaya Elementary School
- Malining Elementary School
- Masanga Elementary School
- Minahan Elementary School
- Pangotloan Elementary School
- Pesa Elementary School
- Sablang Elementary School
- San Marcelino Elementary School
- Sentrong Paaralan ng mga Agta
- Tatawiran Elementary School
- Umiray Elementary School

=== Secondary schools ===
- Batangan National High School
- Mararaot Integrated School
- Maligaya National High School
- Mount Carmel High School
- Paaralang Sekundarya ng Heneral Nakar
- Paaralang Sekundarya ng Heneral Nakar (Umiray Ext)
