= Gaddang language =

Austronesian language spoken in the Philippines

Gaddang
- Cagayan
- Native to: Philippines
- Region: Luzon
- Ethnicity: Gaddang people
- Native speakers: 30,000 (2005)
- Language family: Austronesian: Malayo-Polynesian; Philippine; Northern Luzon; Cagayan Valley; Gaddang

Language codes
- ISO 639-3: gad
- Glottolog: gadd1244
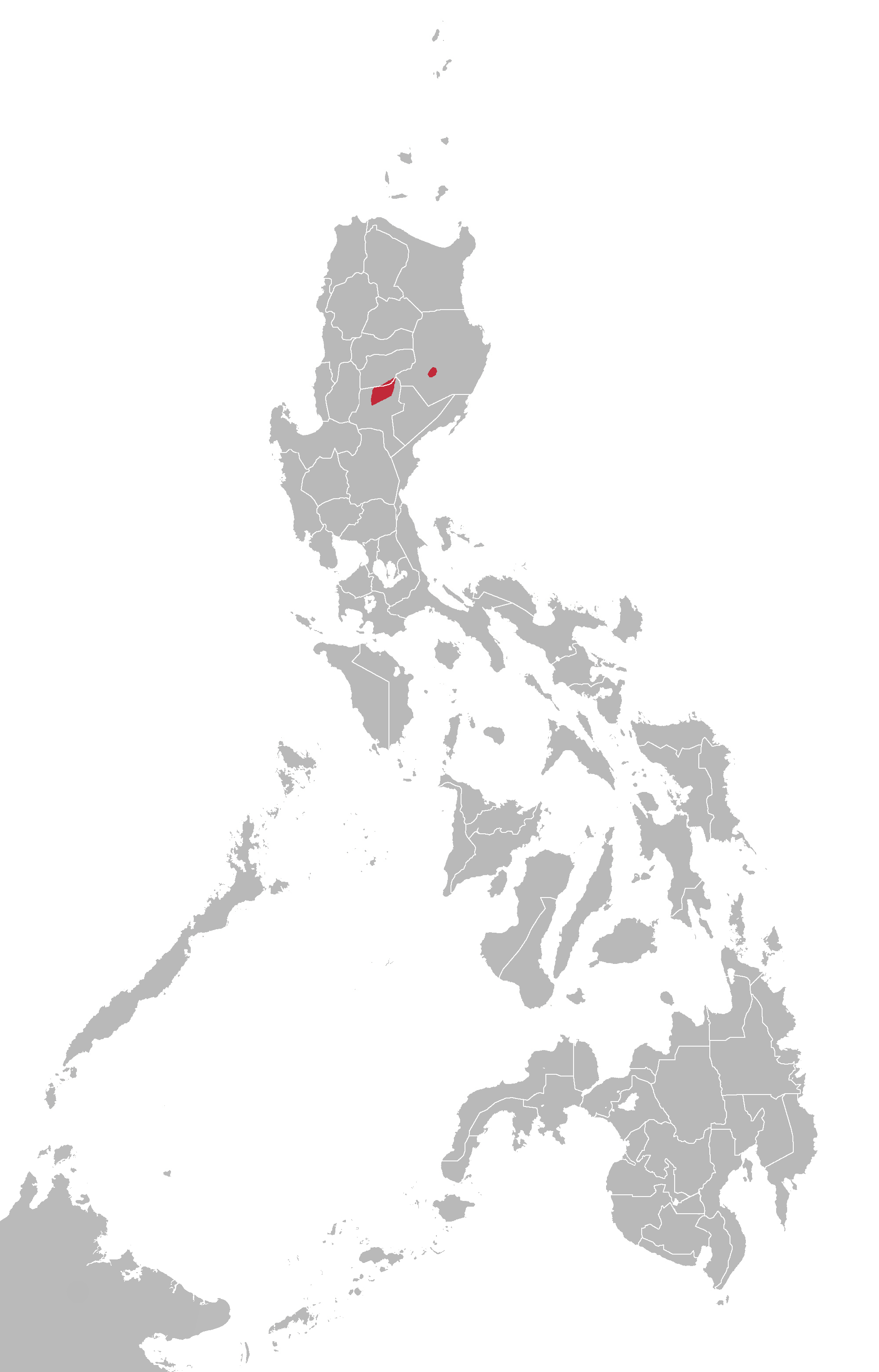
- Areas where Gaddang language is spoken according to Ethnologue maps

The Gaddang language (also Cagayan) is an Austronesian language spoken by up to 30,000 of the Gaddang people in the Philippines, particularly along the Magat and upper Cagayan rivers in the Region II provinces of Nueva Vizcaya and Isabela and by overseas migrants to countries in Asia, Australia, Canada, Europe, in the Middle East, United Kingdom and the United States. Most Gaddang speakers also speak Ilocano, the lingua franca of Northern Luzon, as well as Tagalog and English. Gaddang is associated with the "Christianized Gaddang" people, and is closely related to the highland (non-Christian in local literature) tongues of Ga'dang with 6,000 speakers, Yogad, Cagayan Agta with less than 1,000 and Atta with 2,000 (although the Negrito Aeta and Atta are genetically unrelated to the Austronesian Gaddang), and more distantly to Ibanag, Itawis, Isneg and Malaweg.

The Gaddang tongue has been vanishing from daily and public life over the past half-century. Public and church-sponsored education was historically conducted in Spanish (or later in English), and now in Filipino/Tagalog. The Dominicans tried to replace the multitude of Cagayan-valley languages with Ibanag, and later the plantations imported Ilocanos workers in such numbers that they outnumbered the valley natives. Once significantly-Gaddang communities grew exponentially after WWII due to in-migration of Tagalog, Igorot, and other ethnicities; Gaddang is now a minority language. In the 2000 Census, Gaddang was not even an identity option for residents of Nueva Vizcaya. Vocabulary and structural features of Gaddang among native Gaddang speakers have suffered as well, as usages from Ilokano and other languages affect their parole. Finally, many ethnic Gaddang have migrated to other countries, and their children are not learning the ancestral tongue.

== Geographic Distribution ==
The Gaddang people were identified as I-gaddang (likely meaning 'brown-colored people') by the Spanish in the early 1600s, and differentiated from the Igorots of the highlands by physique, skin color, homelands, and lifestyle. Mary Christine Abriza wrote "The Gaddang are found in northern Nueva Vizcaya, especially Bayombong, Solano, and Bagabag on the western bank of the Magat River, and Santiago, Angadanan, Cauayan, and Reina Mercedes on the Cagayan River for Christianed groups; and western Isabela, along the edges of Kalinga and Bontoc, in the towns of Antatet, Dalig, and the barrios of Gamu and Tumauini for the non-Christian communities. The 1960 census reports that there were 25,000 Gaddang, and that 10% or about 2,500 of these were non-Christian."

Distinct versions of Gaddang may be heard down the valleys of the Magat and Cagayan on the Asian Highway 26 (the Pan-Philippine Highway) through Nueva Vizcaya into Isabela after leaving Santa Fe, where its use is infrequent, and successively through Aritao, Bambang, Bayombong, Solano,(including Quezon & Bintawan), and Bagabag. By the time you arrive in Santiago City, in-migration due to the economic development of the lower Cagayan Valley over the last century means you now must search diligently to hear Gaddang spoken at all.

- Santa Fe, near Dalton Pass, and San Roque (now Mabasa barangay of Dupax del Norte) are reputed originally to have been settled by immigrants from Ilocos and Pangasinan in the latter part of the 19th century. Neither has a large community of Gaddang-speakers.
- Aritao was originally Isinai (with Ibaloi and Aeta minorities), Kayapa is inhabited by Ibaloi farmers and Kankanaey-speaking merchants, while Bambang and Dupax were Ilongot (also locally called Bugkalot); the Gaddang as spoken in these areas incorporates vocabulary and grammar borrowed from these unrelated languages.
- The provincial capital and university town of Bayombong also has an Ilokano-speaking majority (as well as a significant Ifugao minority), however Bayombong has a long history of recognizing the municipality's Gaddang-speaking roots. Despite growing disuse of Gaddang as a language of public and general daily life, Gaddang is often heard at social gatherings in traditional harana, such as "Ope Manke Wayi". Many participants are not, in fact, native speakers; they are often ethnic Ilokanos, Tagalogs, and even non-Filipinos.
- In urban Solano, Gaddang is now rarely used outside the households of native speakers, and the many regional variants are unreconciled. Nueva Vizcaya's largest commercial center in 2013, Solano is effectively an Ilokano-speaking municipality.
- The Bagabag variant of Gaddang is frequently described by residents of the province as the "deepest" version. Some related families in Diadi and the adjoining Ifugao Province municipality of Lamut also continue to speak Gaddang.
- Gaddang-speakers and the linguistically-related Ibanag-speaking peoples were historically the original occupants of what is now the Cagayan Valley province of Isabela, most of which was carved-out from Nueva Vizcaya in 1856. Rapid agricultural development of the new province spurred a wave of Ilokano immigration, and after 1945 the cities of Santiago City, Cauayan and Ilagan City (originally the Gaddang town of Bolo) became major commercial and population centers. Presently, nearly 70% of the 1.5 million residents of Isabela identify themselves as Ilokano, and another 10% as Tagalog. 15% call themselves Ibanag, while the remaining 5% are Gaddang- or Yogad-speakers.

== Phonology ==
The Gaddang language is related to Ibanag, Itawis, Malaueg and others. It is distinct in that it features phonemes not present in many neighboring Philippine languages. As an example, the "f", "v", "z" and "j" sounds appear in Gaddang. There are notable differences from other languages in the distinction between "r" and "l" (and between "r" and "d"), and the "f" sound is a voiceless bilabial fricative somewhat distinct from the fortified "p" sound common in many Philippine languages (but not much closer to the English voiceless labiodental fricative). Finally, the (Spanish) minimally-voiced "J" sound has evolved to a plosive (so the name Joseph sounds to the American ear as Kosip).

=== Vowels ===
Most Gaddang speakers use six vowel sounds: /a/, /i/, /u/, /ɛ/, /o/, /ɯ/

=== Consonants ===
Gaddang features doubled consonants, so the language may sound guttural to Tagalog, Ilokano, and even Pangasinan speakers. The uniqueness of this circumstance is often expressed by saying Gaddang speakers have "a hard tongue".

For example: tudda (tood-duh). which means rice.

Gaddang is also one of the Philippine languages which is excluded from [ɾ]-[d] allophony, they only contrast before consonants and word-final positions; otherwise, they become allophones where [d] is only located in word-initial positions and after consonants & [ɾ] is only pronounced between vowels. In Spanish & Ilocano loanwords, [d] and [ɾ] contrast in all word positions. The <rr> is pronounced as alveolar trill [r]. Before consonants and word-final positions, [ɾ] is in free variation with trill [r].

== Grammar ==
=== Nouns ===
English	Gaddang	Tagalog
house	balai	bahay
girl	bafay	babae
boy	lalaki	lalaki
snake	irao	ahas
person	tolay	tao
water	danum	tubig
plate	duyug	plato; pinggan
light	siruat	ilaw
name	ngan	pangalan
bird	pappitut	ibon
dog	atu	aso
cat	kusa	pusa
pig	bafuy	baboy
carabao	daffug	kalabaw
key	alladdu	susi
road	dalan	daan
stomach	kuyung	tiyan
slipper	sinyelat	tsinelas
food	maak-kan	pagkain
rice cake	dekat	kakanin
mother	ina	ina
father	ama	ama
brother	wayi, manung (pollito)	kapatid, kuya (pollito)
sister	wayi a bafay, manang (pollito)	kapatid, ate (pollito)
sibling	wayi	kapatid

=== Personal pronouns ===
- I – Ik anak
- You – Ik a
- He, she, it – Baggina
- We (exclusive) – Ik ami
- We (inclusive) – Ik anetam
- You (plural/polite) – Ik ayu
- They – Ira
- Sibling – wayi/anak/kolak

=== Demonstrative pronouns ===
- Yao – this
- Yan – that
- Sitao – here
- Sitan – there
- Sinay – over there

=== Interrogative words ===
- What, who – nenay. (nenay ka? 'who are you?', nenay yan? 'what is that?')
- Why – saay/ma/?
- Where – sintaw/sintaw pe?
- Where is – ope
- How – manantaw/insanna?
- How much – pigya

=== Numbers ===
- 0 - awan
- 1 - tata
- 2 - addua
- 3 - tallu
- 4 - appat
- 5 - lima
- 6 - annam
- 7 - pitu
- 8 - walu
- 9 - siyam
- 10 - tafulu
- 11 - tafulu tata
- 12 - tafulu addua
- 13 - tafulu tallu
- 14 - tafulu appat
- 15 - tafulu lima
- 20 - duafulu
- 21 - duafulu tata
- 22 - duafulu dua
- 100 - tahatut
- 200 - duatut
- 500 - limatut
- 1000 - tarifu
- 2000 – duarifu

== Structure ==
Like most languages of the Philippines, Gaddang is declensionally, conjugationally and morphologically agglutinative.

Also like them, it is characterized by a dearth of positional/directional adpositional adjunct words. Temporal references are usually accomplished using agglutinated nouns or verbs.

The following describes similar adpositional structure in Tagalog: "The (locative) marker sa, which leads indirect objects in Filipino, corresponds to English prepositions...we can make other prepositional phrases with sa + other particular conjugations." Gaddang uses si in the same manner as the Tagalog sa, as an all-purpose indication that a spatial or temporal relationship exists.

== Examples ==
=== Simple greetings/questions/phrases ===
- Good morning. – Makasta a daddaramat/nalawad agigibbat.
- Good afternoon. – Makasta a fuwab/nalawad a fuwab.
- Good evening/night. – Makasta a gaffi/nalawad a gafi.
- How are you? – Manantaw ka?
- I'm good and you? – Mappia ak pay, ikka ay?
- I'm just fine, thank God. – Mappia ak pay, mabbalat si dios ay.
- Thank you. – Mabbalat sikuam.
- Where are you going? – Sintaw yo angan nu?
- I'm going to... – Umang ngak ki......
- What are you doing? – Hanna angwa-angwan nu?
- Oh, nothing in particular. – E awan lamang.
- Please come in. – Makigumallak ak, umunag ka.
- Happy birthday. – Maka yoan ka??
- We visit our grandfather. – Binisitan mi e lolo. or bisitan mi e lolo.
- Are we good, grandfather? – Husta eta lolo? or mapia eta lolo?
- Who are you? – Kinno ka?
- Dodge that ball! – Aroyuan nu yo bolla!
- Why are you crying? – Saay a mattangit ka?
- Are there many people here? – Addu (yao) tolay sitao?
- Are you sleepy? – Sikkaturug kan?
- I don't want to sleep yet. – Ammek kepay gustu (a) makkaturug.

=== Sentences ===
Gaddang	Tagalog	English
Sanna yo inakkannu singkabbulan?	Ano ang kinain mo kanina?	What did you eat a while ago?
Sanna yo inakkan diaw sin kabbulan?	Ano ang kinain ninyo kanina ?	What did you (all) eat?
Sanna inakkan nu?	Ano ang kinain mo?	What did you eat?
Sanna "rainbow" ki gaddang?	Ano ang salitang "rainbow" sa gaddang?	What is the word "rainbow" in Gaddang?
Paddatang na, maddaggun kami a manggan .	Pagdating niya, kumakain kami.	We were eating when he came.
Nu dimatang baggina, nakaakkan kamin naddin.	Kung dumating sana siya, nakakain sana kami.	I (We) hope that by the time he would have arrived, we would have eaten.
Mem manggan.	Huwag kang kumain.	Don't eat.
Mangngan ka.	Kumain ka na!	Eat!
Inquak yan! / Akkuak yan!	Akin yan!	That's mine!
Kanggaman ku ikka. / Anggamman ta ka.	Mahal kita.	I love you.

Below are examples of Gaddang proverbs and riddles. Note the Ilokano and even Spanish loan-words.

- Inakkan na lammag ka. (Translated: 'eaten by alligator' ha, ha!)
- Nu boliadanku ay mabbebed – abanasyo. ('If I open it, it gossips – a fan.')
- Si liek a mangngan, mabattuak; akkabalin ku mangngan, mabisinnak – caldero. ('Before a meal, I'm full; afterward I'm hungry – a pot.')
