= Dinagat =

Dinagat can refer to:

== Places in the Philippines ==
- Dinagat Islands, a province in the Philippines
  - Dinagat Island, the primary/main island of the province
  - Dinagat, Dinagat Islands, a municipality in the province
- Dinagat Sound, body of water between the islands of Dinagat and Siargao

== See also ==
- Dumagat (disambiguation)
