= Paranan Agta language =

Language in the Philippines

Pahanan Agta
- Palanan Agta
- Native to: Philippines
- Region: Luzon
- Ethnicity: Aeta
- Native speakers: 1,700 (2009)
- Language family: Austronesian: Malayo-Polynesian; Philippine; Northern Luzon; Northeastern Luzon; Pahanan Agta

Language codes
- ISO 639-3: apf
- Glottolog: agta1234
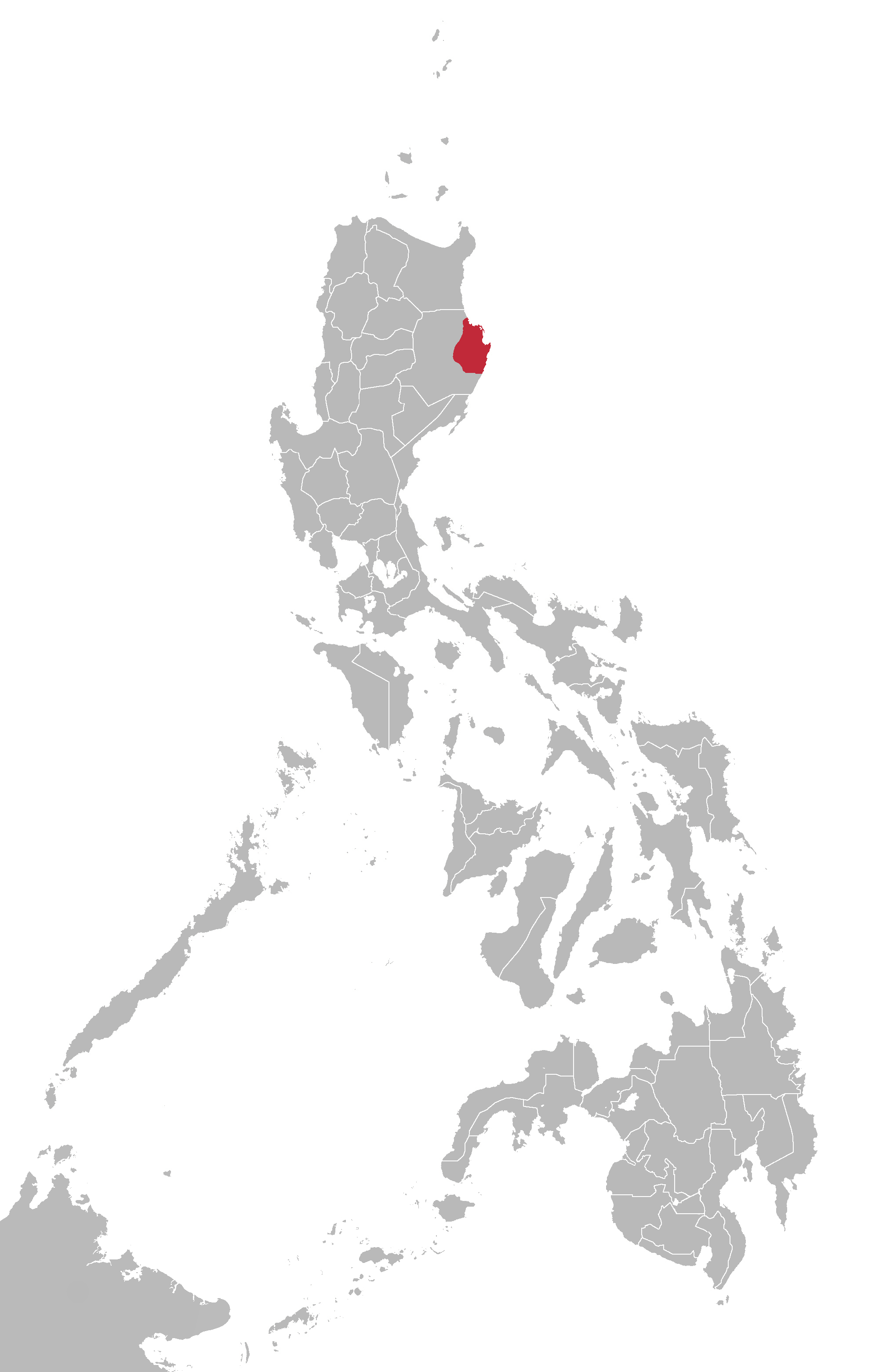
- Area where Pahanan Agta is spoken according to Ethnologue

Pahanan Agta, also called Palanan Agta, is an Aeta language of Palanan, Isabela northern Philippines. Lexically but not grammatically it is extremely close to Paranan, a non-Negrito language with a very similar name. Speaker groups of both languages were together isolated from other communities and remained in constant interaction.
