= Dupaningan Agta =

Austronesian language of the Philippines

- Eastern Cagayan Agta
- Native to: Philippines
- Region: northern Luzon
- Ethnicity: Aeta
- Native speakers: 1,400 (2008)
- Language family: Austronesian: Malayo-Polynesian; Philippine; Northern Luzon; Northeastern Luzon; Dupaningan Agta
- Dialects: Yaga; Tanglagan; Santa Ana-Gonzaga; Barongagunay; Palaui Island; Valley Cove; Bolos Point; Peñablanca; Roso (Southeast Cagayan); Santa Margarita

Language codes
- ISO 639-3: duo
- Glottolog: dupa1235
- ELP: Dupaninan Agta
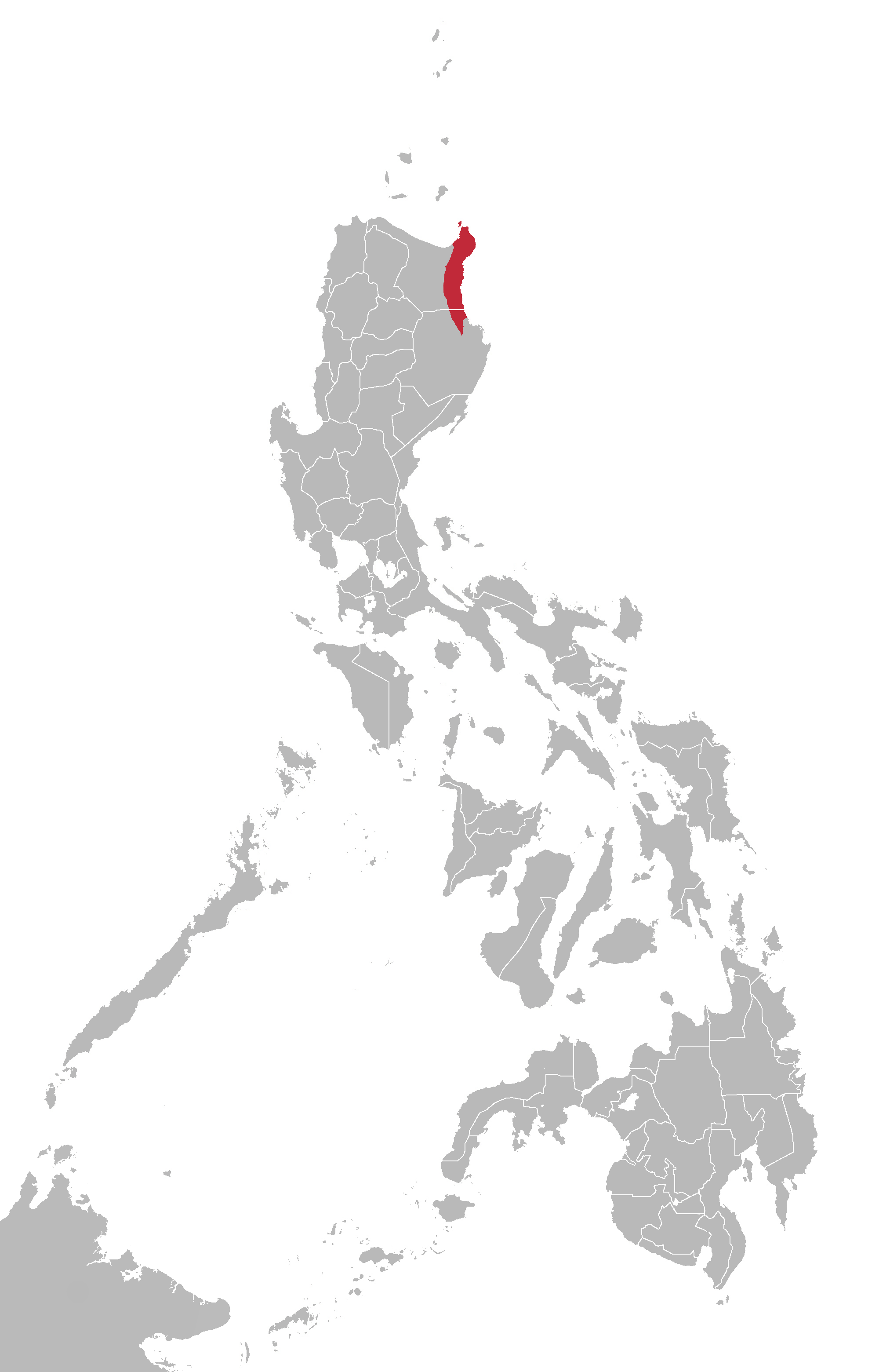
- Area where Dupaningan Agta is spoken according to Ethnologue

Dupaningan Agta (Dupaninan Agta), or Eastern Cagayan Agta, is an Austronesian language spoken by a semi-nomadic hunter-gatherer Negrito people of Cagayan and Isabela provinces in northern Luzon, Philippines. Its Yaga dialect is only partially intelligible.

== Geographic distribution and dialects ==
Robinson (2008) reports Dupaningan Agta to be spoken by a total of about 1,400 people in about 35 scattered communities, each with 1-70 households.

- Palaui Island - Speakers do not consider themselves to be Dupaningan, but the language is very similar to that of the other Dupaningans.
- Nangaramuan, Santa Ana
- Barongagunay, Santa Clara, Santa Ana
- Valley Cove, Baggao
- Kattot
- Bolos a Ballek (Bolos Point) - village where the Dupaningan Agta language is most widely used
- Bolos a Dakal (Bolos, Maconacon, Isabela)
- Santa Clara, Gonzaga, Cagayan

Ethnologue reports Yaga, Tanglagan, Santa Ana-Gonzaga, Barongagunay, Palaui Island, Camonayan, Valley Cove, Bolos Point, Peñablanca, Roso (Southeast Cagayan), Santa Margarita as dialects of Dupaningan Agta.

== Phonology ==
=== Consonants ===
	Labial	Alveolar	Velar	Glottal
Stop	p b	t d	k g	(ʔ)
Nasal	m	n	ŋ	
Trill/Tap		r~ɾ		
Lateral		l		
Fricative		s		h
Glide	w	j		

Where symbols appear in pairs, the one to the right is voiced.

=== Vowels ===
	Front	Central	Back
High	i		u
Mid	e		o
Low		a	

/a, e/ have lax allophones of [ə, ɛ].
