= Ata language (Negros) =

Philippine Negrito language

Ata
- Native to: Philippines
- Region: Negros Island
- Native speakers: 1–2 (2021)
- Language family: Austronesian: Malayo-Polynesian; Philippine; Central Philippine; (unclassified); Ata

Language codes
- ISO 639-3: atm
- Glottolog: ataa1240
- ELP: Ata

Ata is a nearly extinct Philippine Negrito language spoken in Negros Island in the Visayas region of the Philippines.

As of 2013, Ata was reportedly spoken by no more than three or four elderly individuals in northern Negros Island, Philippines, although two of those died in 2021.
