= Northern Alta language =

Austronesian language spoken in the Philippines

Northern Alta
- Edimala
- Native to: Philippines
- Region: Luzon
- Native speakers: (200 cited 2000)
- Language family: Austronesian: Malayo-Polynesian; Philippine; Northern Luzon; Meso-Cordilleran; Alta; Northern Alta

Language codes
- ISO 639-3: aqn
- Glottolog: nort2875
- ELP: Northern Alta
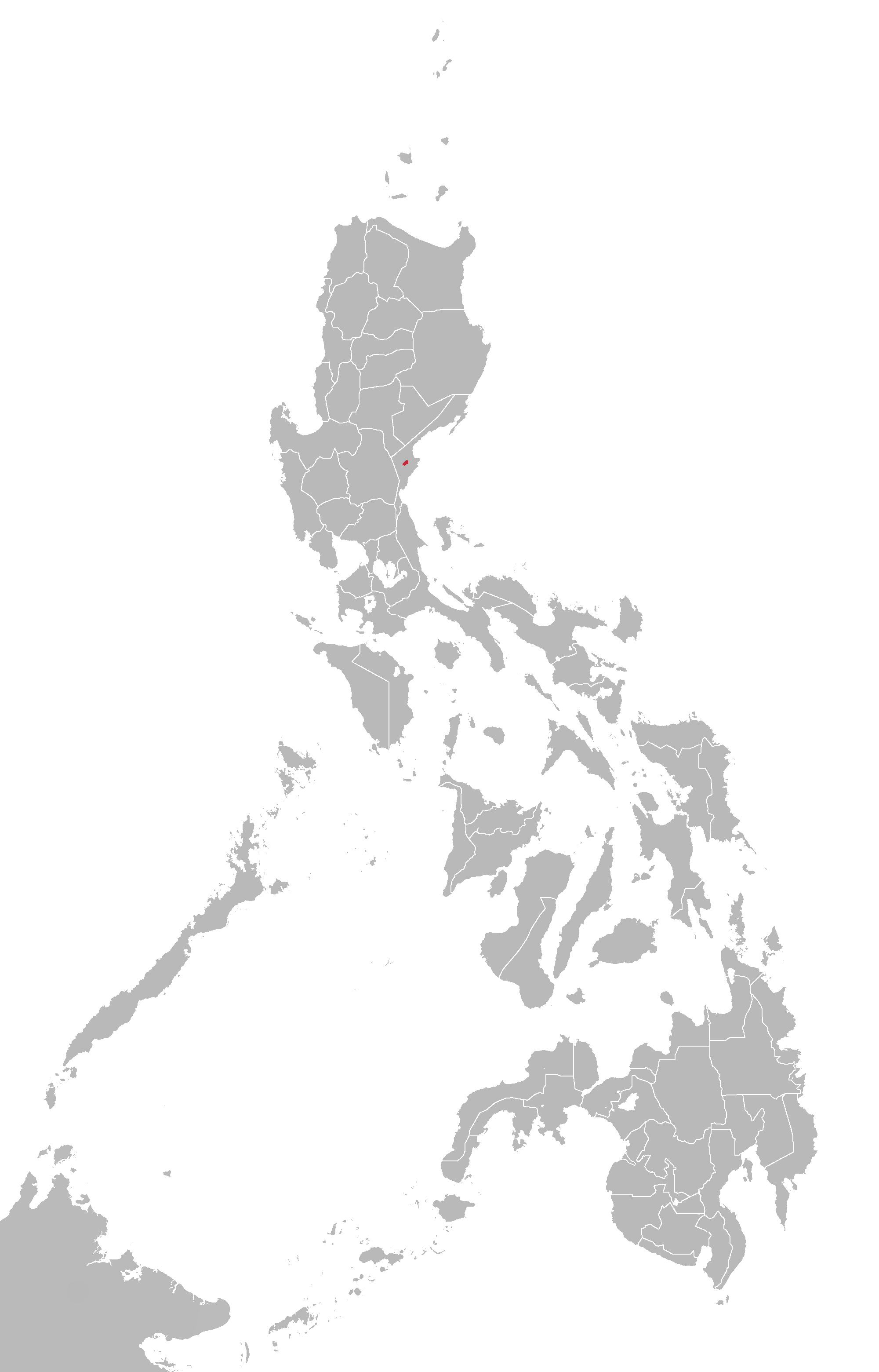
- Area where Northern Alta is spoken, according to Ethnologue

Northern Alta (also called Edimala) is a distinctive Aeta language of the mountains of the Sierra Madre in Aurora province, Northern Philippines. Linguist Lawrence Reid reports two different Alta languages, Northern and Southern Alta, which form one of the high nodes of the Northern Luzon languages, together with the South-Central Cordilleran subgroup. Although the Alta languages are genetically related, they have a low level of mutual intelligibility.

Jason Lobel and Laura Robinson did fieldwork on Northern Alta in 2006 (Lobel 2013:87).

Alexandro García-Laguía did fieldwork for extended periods between 2013 and 2021 and created a language documentation corpus and a grammatical description of the language.

== Geographical distribution ==
There are Northern Alta speakers known as Edimala who live in the Sierra Madre along the river valleys that flow out to the Baler plain in Aurora Province. The Northern Alta also reportedly live in Dibut, on the coast south of Baler municipality, and north of Dicapanisan. Reid (1991) collected Northern Alta data from a speaker of Malabida, who was visiting in Bayanihan, an Ilongot-speaking barangay north of Maria Aurora, Aurora at the edge of the Sierra Madre. Ethnologue also reports that Northern Alta is spoken in San Luis, Aurora.

Reid (1994) lists the following locations for Northern Alta.

- Baler, Aurora
- Ditailin, Maria Aurora, Aurora
- Malevida, Dianawan, Maria Aurora, Aurora
- Diteki, San Luis, Aurora (listed in Ethnologue as Diteki River in the Bayanihan area)

García-Laguía (2018) collected Northern Alta data in the barangays of Diteki, Dianed, and Decoliat. García Laguía (2018) also reported that there were Alta people living in the communities of Malabida, Dimani (Barangay Villa), Dupinga, and Labi.

== Phonology ==
Consonants
	Labial	Alveolar	Palatal	Velar	Glottal
Plosive/Affricate	p b	t d	(dʒ)	k g	ʔ
Fricative		s			h
Nasal	m	n		ŋ	
Approximant	w	l, (r)	j		

- The phonemes /r/ and /dʒ/ only appear in loanwords, however, [dʒ] can also be a realisation of the sequence /dijV/ in fast speech, even in native words.
- All consonants except for /r/ may be geminated.
- [s] and [h] are in free variation in certain grammatical particles, despite normally being separate phonemes.

Vowels
	Front	Central	Back
High	i		u
Mid	(ɛ)	ə	(ɔ)
Low		a	

- /ɛ/ and /ɔ/ are only found in loanwords.
- /ə/ can range to [ɨ] in realization, and optionally [a] in certain prefixes.
- /i/ is pronounced as [ɪ] or [ɪ:] in a specific set of words.
- /u/ can range to [o] in realization.

Additionally, the following diphthongs are found: /ai/, /au/, /әi/, /ui/.

Stress is phonemic, but unpredictable.

== Grammar ==
Northern Alta is a Philippine-type language. It exhibits a voice system in which one actor voice and three different undergoer voices are distinguished. Subjects and other clause constituents are case-marked: person pronouns and demonstratives inflect for case. Determiner phrases carry a case-marking determiner at the leftmost edge of the phrase. Predicates appear in initial position except when a constituent is topicalized; in this case, a predicate marker (PM) precedes the predicate. The language distinguishes three basic clause types: equational, existential/locative, and voice-marked.

- Equational clauses have either a noun, a proform, or a non-verbal phrase in predicate position.
- Existential and locative clauses are respectively headed by an existential operator or the locative copula ʔisaj 'be at'. Both clause types take a predicative complement, which expresses an existing entity in existential clauses or a location in locative clauses.
- Voice-marked clauses are characterized by an affix that marks the verb for voice, and come in two types, depending on whether the subject expresses an actor or an undergoer. The former type are called actor voice (AV) clauses and the latter are undergoer voice (UV) clauses. UV clauses come in three types, patient voice (PV), locative voice (LV), and conveyance voice (CV). The following example shows an AV clause:

mənhuli=sija ti ʔiʔan=i]
AV2-hunt=3S.ABS OBL fish=SP
‘he catches some fish’ (85.68)
