= Umiray Dumaget language =

Austronesian language spoken in the Philippines

Umiray Dumaget
- Native to: Philippines
- Region: Aurora & Quezon, Luzon
- Native speakers: (3,000 cited 1994)
- Language family: Austronesian: Malayo-Polynesian; Philippine?; Greater Central Philippine; Umiray Dumaget

Language codes
- ISO 639-3: due
- Glottolog: umir1236

Umiray Dumaget is an Aeta language spoken in southern Luzon Island, Philippines.

== Location ==
Umiray Dumaget is spoken along the Pacific coast of eastern Luzon, Philippines, from just south of Baler, Aurora, to the area of Infanta, Quezon, and on the northern coast of Polillo Island. Himes (2002) reports little dialectal variation.

Reid (1994) reports the following locations for Umiray Dumaget (Central Agta).

- Umiray, General Nakar, Quezon
- Dibut, San Luis, Aurora
- Bunbun, Panukulan, Polillo, Quezon

The language is also spoken in Dingalan, Aurora, most especially in Umiray.

== Phonology ==
=== Consonants ===
Umiray Dumaget consonants
		Labial	Alveolar	Palatal	Velar	Glottal
Plosive	voiceless	p	t		k	(ʔ)
Plosive	voiced	b	d		ɡ	
Nasal		m	n		ŋ	
Fricative			s			
Trill			r			
Lateral			l			
Approximant		w		j		

[ʔ] only appears in loanwords.

=== Vowels ===
Umiray Dumaget vowels
	Front	Back
Close	i	u
Open	a	

== Classification ==
Umiray Dumaget is difficult to classify. Himes (2002) posits a Greater Central Philippine connection. However, Lobel (2013) believes that Umiray Dumaget may be a primary branch of the Philippine languages, or may be related to the Northeastern Luzon languages, Sambali-Ayta (Central Luzon), or Manide and Inagta Alabat. According to Lobel (2013), Umiray Dumaget does not subgroup in the Central Philippine or even Greater Central Philippine branches.
