= Cagayan Valley languages =

Language family of the Philippines

Cagayan Valley
- Geographic distribution: north Luzon
- Linguistic classification: Austronesian: Malayo-Polynesian; Northern Luzon; Cagayan Valley

Language codes
- ISO 639-3: –
- Glottolog: caga1241

The Cagayan Valley languages are a group of languages spoken in the Philippines. They are:

- Cagayan Valley
  - Isnag
    - Bayag
    - Calanasan
    - Dibagat-Kabugao
    - Karagawan
    - Talifugu-Ripang
  - Ibanagic
    - Adasen
      - Eastern Addasen
      - Western Addasen
    - Atta
      - Faire Atta
      - Pamplona Atta
      - Pudtol Atta
    - Ibanag
      - North Ibanag
      - South Ibanag
    - Malaweg
    - Gaddangic
      - Central Cagayan Agta
      - Itawit
      - Yogad
      - Cagayan-Baliwon Gaddang
        - Ga'dang
        - Gaddang
