= Central Cagayan Agta language =

Austronesian language spoken in the Philippines

Central Cagayan Agta
- Cagayan Agta
- Native to: Philippines
- Region: Luzon
- Ethnicity: Aeta
- Native speakers: (780 cited 2000)
- Language family: Austronesian: Malayo-Polynesian; Philippine; Northern Luzon; Cagayan Valley; Gaddangic; Central Cagayan Agta

Language codes
- ISO 639-3: agt
- Glottolog: cent2084
- ELP: Central Cagayan Agta

Central Cagayan Agta, also known as Labin Agta, is an Austronesian language and Aeta language of northern Cagayan Province, Philippines. It is spoken by the Aeta Negritos in inland areas located to the east and northeast of Baggao (Ethnologue).

== Locations ==
Reid (1994) reports the following locations for Central Cagayan Agta.

- Gattaran, Cagayan (including Yaga and Tanglagan)
- Sitio Mammit, San Mariano, Lal-Lo, Cagayan
- Camonayan, Baggao, Cagayan

However, Ethnologue reports the locations for Central Cagayan Agta:

- Cagayan Valley Region: Cagayan province inland area,
- East and Northeast from Baggao.
