= Tayabas Tagalog =

Dialect of Tagalog

- Quezon Tagalog
- Tayabasin ᜆᜌᜊᜐᜒᜈ᜔
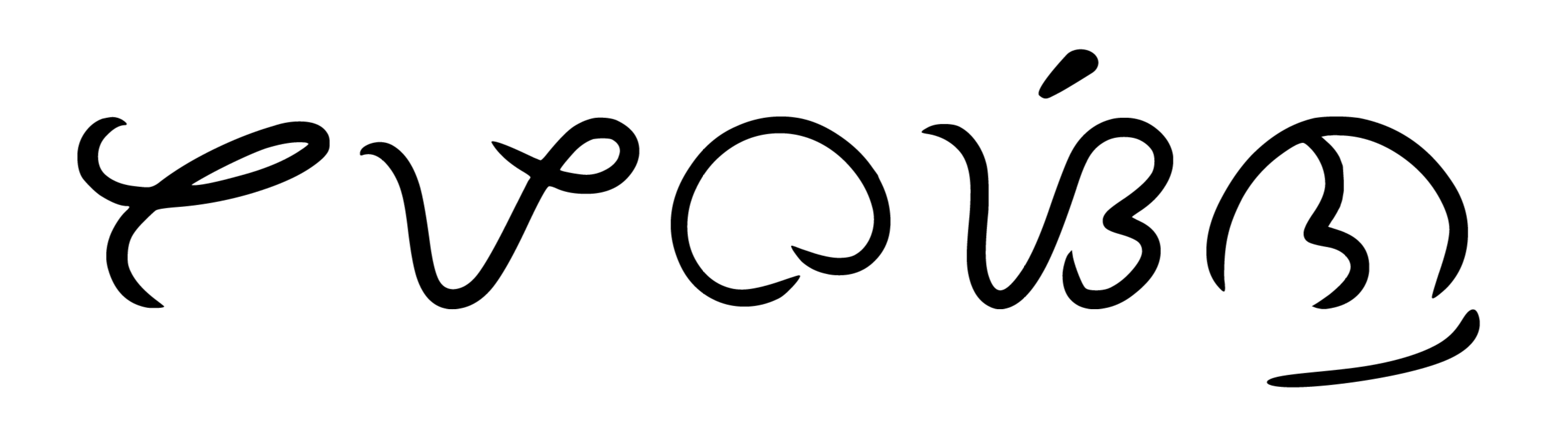
- The term "Tayabasin" written in Baybayin script with horizontal virama ("pangaltas")
- Native to: Philippines
- Region: Quezon, Aurora
- Ethnicity: Tagalog people
- Native speakers: Quezonin | Tayabasin
- Language family: Austronesian: Malayo-Polynesian; Philippine; Greater Central Philippine; Central Philippine; Kasiguranin–Tagalog; Tagalog; Tayabas Tagalog
- Writing system: Latin (Abakada or Filipino alphabet); Baybayin (revitalizing)

Language codes
- ISO 639-3: –
- Glottolog: taya1253

Tayabas Tagalog (also known as Tayabasin) is a distinct form of Tagalog primarily spoken by the native Tagalog people of Quezon Province, which was formerly known as Tayabas Province. This dialect has evolved over time and retains unique linguistic features and vocabulary influenced by the province history and culture. This dialect retains many linguistic features that are not as prevalent in the more common Tagalog spoken in metropolitan areas like Manila. Within the province, there are also variants of dialectal terms that may be peculiar to other towns, adding to the linguistic diversity of the area.

== Nomenclature ==
Tayabas Tagalog, the dialect spoken in Quezon, is named after the province's old name, "Tayabas," and the language generally used in the area, "Tagalog." Historian and anthropologist E. Arsenio Manuel used the term and conducted a lexicographic study, considering Tayabas Tagalog a dialect of Tagalog. Before World War II came to the Philippines, "Tayabasin" was already a common term referring to this dialect or the people of the province.

== Dialectal vocabulary ==
Tayabas Tagalog highlights thousands of native vocabulary words that are not present in Bulacan-Manila Tagalog, as documented in the lexicographic study of Dr. E. Arsenio Manuel. Most of Tayabasin dialectal vocabulary can be found in Vocabulario De Lengua Tagala, the first Spanish-Tagalog dictionary written by Pedro de San Buenaventura in 1613. This means that the words preserved in Tayabas Tagalog were already in use even before the Spaniards conquered the Philippines.

English	General/Basic Tagalog	Tayabas Tagalog (Quezon)
invite	yaya	akit
fight	away	babag
bunch of coconuts	buwig ng niyog	bagaybay
a tool used for scraping coconut meat	kayuran o kudkuran ng niyog	kabyawan
cloud/ nimbus	ulap/ulap-ulan	dag-im
handrail	hawakan sa hagdan	guyabnan
scythe	kawit	halabas
throw in the fire	ilagay sa apoy	isugba
remote area/ farm	kabukiran, rural na lugar	linang
young coconut	buko	mura
skewer	pantuhog	tindagan

_{Selected Quezonian or Tayabas Tagalog vocabulary (Focus on Lucenahin words)}

== Literary Form ==
The term “awit” in Tagalog primarily means “song.” It has been used as a generic term for various types of songs. In Quezon Province, Tayabas "awit" is unique for its twelve-syllable verses and its association with dance. It is commonly performed during social gatherings and celebrations, such as weddings and baptisms.

Sample quotes from Tayabas Tagalog Awit Fragments "Awit sa Pagpapatulog ng Bata." This lullaby (Tagalog: hele or oyayi) is traditionally sung to help put children to sleep with its gentle and soothing melody.

Naito na naman ang bangkang may kangkong,

Kasama si Neneng sa pagbabakasyon

Saya ay maskota, tapis at patadyong,

Baro, bitubito, panyong layronlayron.

Ikaw pala Neneng ay maraming damit

Purongpurong sutla habing kamarines;

Sino ang magdadala, sino ang magbibitbit?

Si Donya Mariya, anak ni Don Felis.

== Related pages ==
- Batangas Tagalog
- Bulacan Tagalog
