= Northern Luzon languages =

Subgroup of the Austronesian language family

Northern Luzon
- Cordilleran
- Geographic distribution: Cordillera Central (Luzon)
- Native speakers: 12,928,780 (2020)
- Linguistic classification: Austronesian: Malayo-Polynesian; Philippine (?); Northern Luzon
- Subdivisions: Ilocano; Cagayan Valley; Meso-Cordilleran; Northeastern Luzon; Dicamay Agta †; Arta

Language codes
- Glottolog: nort3238
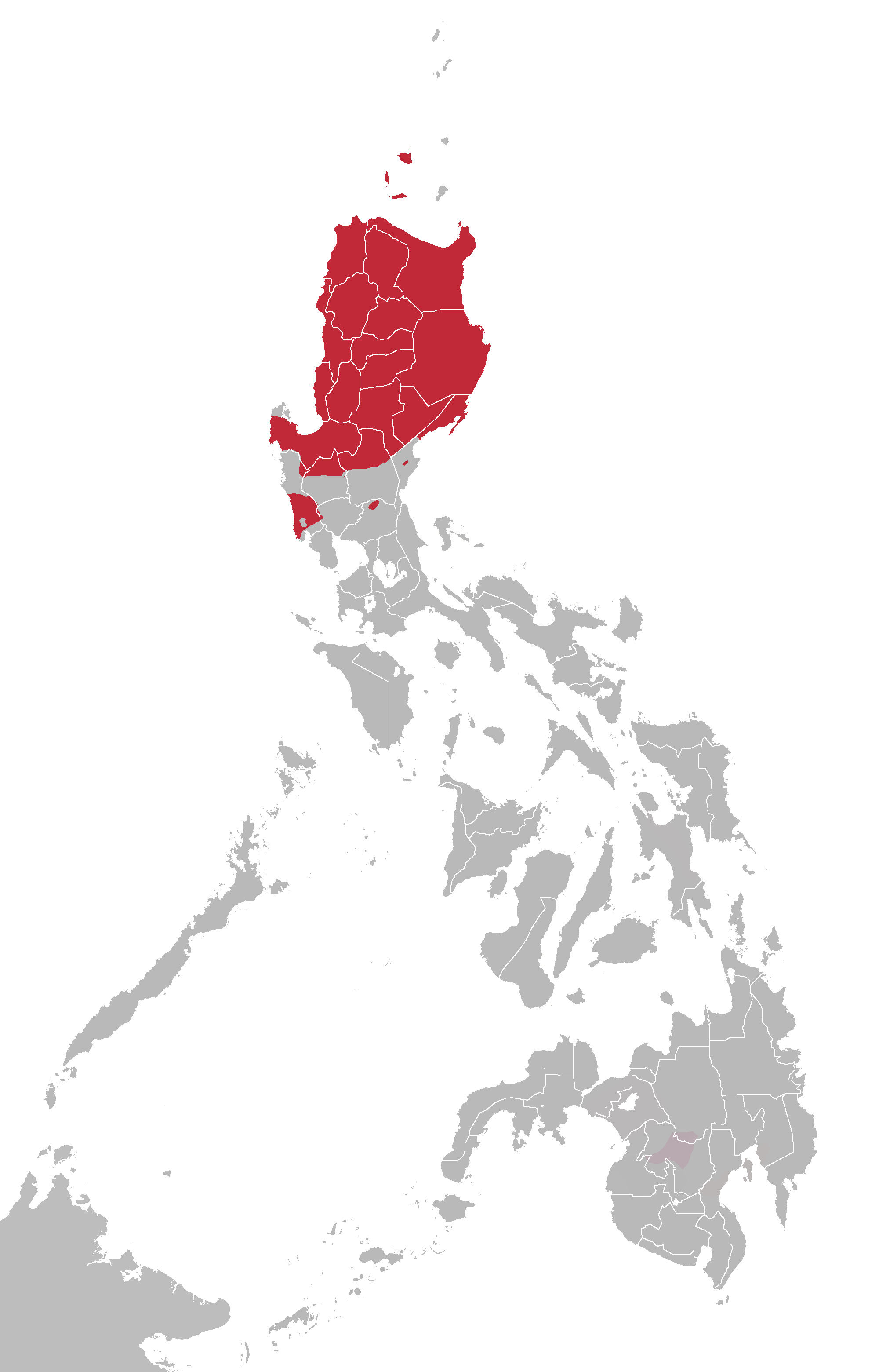
- Geographic extent of Northern Luzon languages based on Ethnologue

The Northern Luzon languages (also known as the Cordilleran languages) are one of the few established large groups within Philippine languages. These are mostly located in and around the Cordillera Central of northern Luzon in the Philippines. Among its major languages are Ilocano, Pangasinan and Ibanag.

== Internal classification ==
Lawrence Reid (2018) divides the over thirty Northern Luzon languages into five branches: the Northeastern Luzon, Cagayan Valley and Meso-Cordilleran subgroups, further Ilokano and Arta as group-level isolate branches. (Note: † indicates that the language is extinct.)

- Northern Luzon
  - Ilocano
  - Arta
  - Dicamay Agta † (unclassified)
  - Cagayan Valley
    - Isnag
    - Ibanagic
      - Atta
      - Ibanag
      - Itawis
      - Yogad
    - Gaddang-Cagayan
      - Central Cagayan Agta
      - Gaddang
      - Ga'dang
  - Northeastern Luzon
    - Dupaningan Agta
    - (core)
      - Dinapigue Agta
      - Casiguran Agta, Nagtipunan Agta
      - Pahanan Agta, Paranan
  - Meso-Cordilleran
    - Northern Alta
    - Southern Alta
    - South-Central Cordilleran
      - Central Cordilleran
        - Isinai
        - North Central Cordilleran
          - Kalinga-Itneg
            - Itneg
            - Kalinga
          - Nuclear Cordilleran
            - Ifugao
            - Balangao
            - Bontok-Kankanaey
              - Bontok-Finallig
              - Kankanaey
      - Southern Cordilleran
        - Bugkalot
        - West Southern Cordilleran
          - Pangasinan
          - Nuclear Southern Cordilleran
            - Ibaloi
            - Iwaak
            - Kallahan
            - Karao

== Reconstruction ==
Proto-Northern Luzon
- Reconstruction of: Northern Luzon languages
- Reconstructed ancestors: Proto-Austronesian: Proto-Malayo-Polynesian; Proto-Philippine
- Lower-order reconstructions: Proto-Central Cordilleran; Proto-Southern Cordilleran

=== Phonology ===
Reid (2006) has reconstructed the Proto-Northern Luzon sound system as follows, with phonemic stress:

Vowels
	Front	Central	Back
Close	*i	*ɨ	*u
Open		*a	

Consonants
		Bilabial	Alveolar	Palatal	Velar	Glottal
Stop	voiceless	*p	*t		*k	*ʔ
Stop	voiced	*b	*d	*j	*g	
Fricative			*s			
Nasal		*m	*n		*ŋ	
Lateral			*l			
Approximant		*w		*y		

The sound inventory of Proto-Northern Luzon shows no innovations from Proto-Malayo-Polynesian that would set it apart from other Philippine languages. There are however two phonological innovations that characterize the Northern Luzon languages:

- Loss of final *ʔ (< *q)
- Metathesis of *s and *t, e.g. Proto-Northern Luzon *saŋit < Proto-Malayo-Polynesian *taŋis 'weep', *Rasut < *Ratus 'hundred'.

=== Vocabulary ===
Lexical innovations only found in Northern Luzon languages include: *dutdut 'feather, body hair', *kəməl 'squeeze', *lətəg 'swell', *yəgyəg 'earthquake', *takdəg 'stand', *ʔubət 'buttocks'. Semantic shifts are observed e.g. in *ʔatəd 'give' (cf. Proto-Philippine *hatəd 'escort') and *laman 'wild pig' (cf. Proto-Philippine *laman 'flesh').

== See also ==
- Northeastern Luzon languages
