= Hatang Kayi language =

Austronesian language spoken in the Philippines

Remontado Dumagat
- Sinauna, Remontado Agta
- Hatang-Kayi
- Native to: Philippines
- Region: Tanay, Rodriguez, and Antipolo in Rizal, and General Nakar, Quezon
- Native speakers: (2,500 cited 2000)
- Language family: Austronesian: Malayo-Polynesian; Philippine; Central Luzon; Remontado Dumagat

Language codes
- ISO 639-3: agv
- Glottolog: remo1247
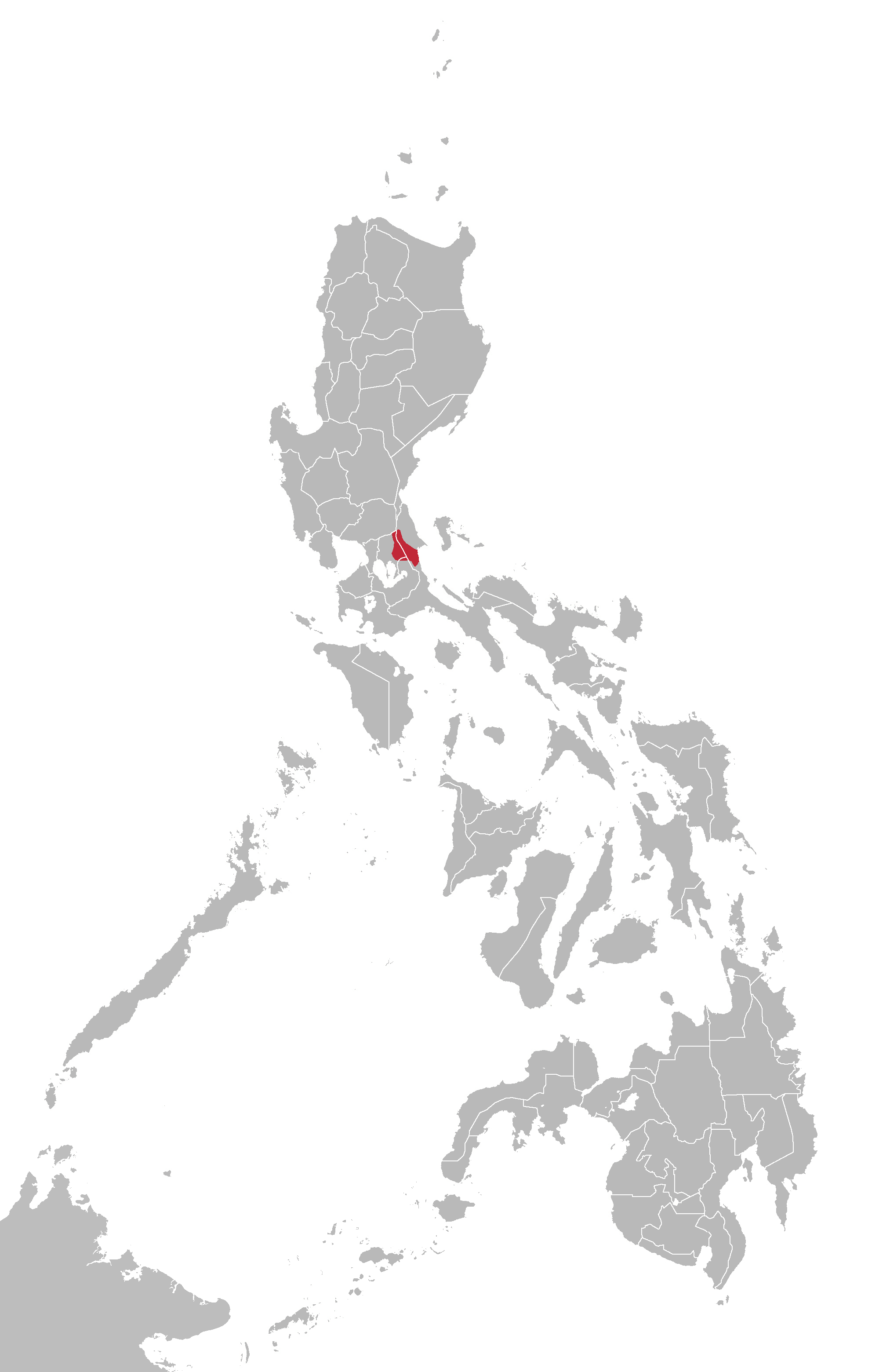
- Area where the Hatang Kayi language is spoken

Remontado, also known by the autonym Hatang-Kayi and in the literature as Kabalat, Remontado Dumagat, and the erroneous names Sinauna/Sinaunang Tagalog, is a Malayo-Polynesian language spoken in Tanay, Rizal, General Nakar, Quezon (including in Paimahuan, Limoutan), Rodriguez, Rizal and Antipolo, in the Philippines. It is one of the Philippine Negrito languages. It is a moribund language.

== Terminology ==
The language is referred to by various terms in linguistic literature. The speakers refer to their language as Hatang-Kayi ('this language') while Remontado is the most common term in English literature used to refer to both the community and their language. Sinauna (meaning 'ancient' or 'old' in Tagalog) is a term used in some literature that originates after the language's discovery in the 1970s but has never been used by the speakers of the language themselves.

Remontado Agta has also been used but this is also erroneous as speakers of this language are never referred to as Agta.

== Classification ==
Reid (2010) classifies the language as a Central Luzon language, just like Kapampangan and Sambal.

== Distribution ==
The Remontado Dumagat were traditionally found in the mountains around the boundary between Barangay Sampaloc in Tanay, Rizal, and General Nakar, Quezon.

Today, Remontado is spoken in the following five villages, where it is only spoken by elderly people over the age of 50. Two of the villages are in Barangay Santa Inez, Tanay, Rizal, and three of the villages are in Barangay Limutan, General Nakar, Quezon.

- Minanga (Sentro), Barangay Limutan, General Nakar, Quezon
- Sitio Sari, Barangay Limutan, General Nakar, Quezon
- Sitio Paimuhuan, Barangay Limutan, General Nakar, Quezon
- Sitio Nayon, Barangay Santa Inez, Tanay, Rizal
- Sitio Kinabuan, Barangay Santa Inez, Tanay, Rizal

== Grammar ==
Hatang Kayi Case Markers
		Nominative	Genitive	Oblique
Common		i (non-past, generic) ta (proximate) ya (nonpast/specific/referential) pu (past/specific)	id	kad
Personal	singular	si	in	kan
Personal	plural	ra	rará	kannára
