= Yogad language =

Language spoken on Luzon, Philippines

Yogad
- Native to: Philippines
- Region: Luzon
- Native speakers: (16,000 cited 1990 census)
- Language family: Austronesian: Malayo-Polynesian; Philippine; Northern Luzon; Cagayan Valley; Ibanagic; Yogad

Language codes
- ISO 639-3: yog
- Glottolog: yoga1237
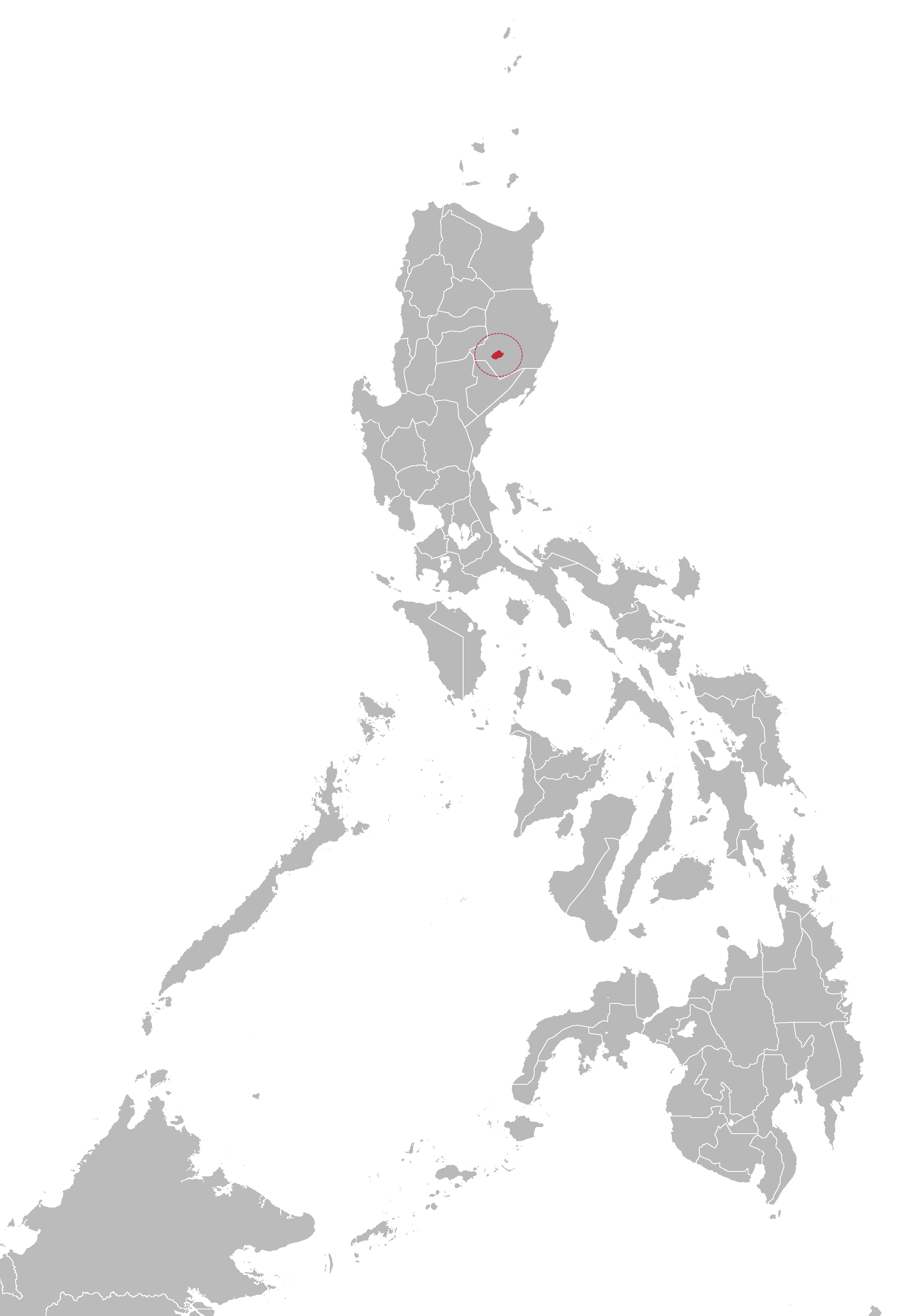
- Area where the Yogad language is spoken

Yogad is an Austronesian language spoken primarily in Echague and other nearby towns in Isabela province in northern Philippines. The 1990 census claimed there were around 16,000 speakers.

== Classification ==
Anthropologist H. Otley Beyer describes Yogad as a variant of Gaddang language and the people as a sub-group of the Gaddang people in his 1917 catalogue of Philippines ethnic groups. Glottolog presently groups it as a member of the Gaddangic group; in 2015, however, Ethnologue placed Yogad as a separate member of the Ibanagic language family. Godfrey Lambrecht, CICM, also distinguished separately the peoples who spoke the two languages.

== Alphabet ==
Formerly, the Yogad alphabet had 21 letters composed of 16 consonants and 5 vowels.

Yogad Alphabet
Majuscule Letter	A	B	K	D	E	F	G
Minuscule Letter	a	b	k	d	e	f	g
IPA	/a/	/b/	/k/	/d/	/ɛ/	/f/	/ɡ/
Majuscule Letter	H	I	L	M	N	NG	O
Minuscule Letter	h	i	l	m	n	ng	o
IPA	/h/	/i/	/l/	/m/	/n/	/ŋ/	/o/
Majuscule Letter	P	R	S	T	U	W	Y
Minuscule Letter	p	r	s	t	u	w	y
IPA	/p/	/ɾ/	/s/	/t/	/u/	/w/	/j/

Currently, the official Yogad alphabet includes letters for borrowed words and is therefore identical to the 28-letter Filipino alphabet.
