= Casiguran Dumagat Agta =

Austronesian language spoken in the Philippines

Casiguran Agta
- Casiguran Dumagat
- Native to: Philippines
- Region: Luzon
- Ethnicity: Agta
- Native speakers: (610 cited 1989)
- Language family: Austronesian: Malayo-Polynesian; Philippine; Northern Luzon; Northeastern Luzon; Southern; Casiguran Agta
- Dialects: Nagtipunan Agta

Language codes
- ISO 639-3: dgc
- Glottolog: casi1235
- ELP: Casiguran Dumagat Agta

Casiguran Dumagat Agta, also known as Casiguran Agta (after the endonym Agta, the name which the people call themselves and their language), is a Northeastern Luzon language spoken in the northern Philippines. It is spoken by around 610 speakers, most of whom live in the San Ildefonso Peninsula, across the bay from Casiguran, Aurora.

The language was first documented in 1936 by Christian missionaries. There are many surviving works of Father Morice Vanoverbergh that document the language. Although the language has gone through rapid cultural change since his early work, the Father's writings still give a window of insight into what the language and the culture of the people was. Since then it has been continually documented by the late SIL linguists Thomas and Janet Headland. A New Testament translation was published in 1979, titled Bigu a Tipan: I mahusay a baheta para ta panahun tam. Among the languages spoken by Philippine "Negrito" populations, Casiguran Dumagat Agta has been one of the most extensively studied.

Casiguran Dumagat is closely related to Dupaningan Agta, Pahanan Agta (near Palanan town), Paranan (the non-Agta language of Palanan town), and Dinapigue Agta. A speech variety called Nagtipunan Agta was discovered by Jason Lobel and Laura Robinson in Nagtipunan, Quirino in 2006. Casiguran Agta has a big influence of loanwords on another local language Kasiguranin. Casiguran Agta has been described as having eight vowel sounds, compared to the usual four in most Philippine languages.
