= Paranan language =

Austronesian language spoken in the Philippines

Paranan
- Palanan
- Native to: Philippines
- Region: Isabela, Luzon
- Native speakers: 15,000 (2009)
- Language family: Austronesian: Malayo-Polynesian; Philippine; Northern Luzon; Northeastern Luzon; Paranan

Language codes
- ISO 639-3: prf
- Glottolog: para1306

Paranan, also called Palanan, is a Philippine language belonging to the Northern Luzon languages. It is spoken in the northeastern coastal areas of Isabela, Philippines.

Lexically but not grammatically, it is extremely close to Pahanan Agta as groups of both languages were together isolated from other communities and remained in constant interaction. The ISO 639-3 code is now prf; it had been agp which included Pahanan Agta.
