= Atta language =

Austronesian language spoken in the Philippines

Atta
- Native to: Philippines
- Region: Luzon
- Ethnicity: Aeta
- Native speakers: (2,000 cited 1998–2000)
- Language family: Austronesian: Malayo-Polynesian; Philippine; Northern Luzon; Cagayan Valley; Ibanagic; Atta

Language codes
- ISO 639-3: Variously: azt – Faire Atta att – Pamplona Atta atp – Pudtol Atta dyg – Villa Viciosa Agta^{†} (?)
- Glottolog: atta1244
- ELP: Faire Atta

Atta is an Austronesian dialect cluster spoken by the Aeta (Agta) Negritos of the northern Philippines.

== Varieties ==
There are three varieties according to Ethnologue.

- Faire Atta (Southern Atta): spoken near Faire, Rizal, Cagayan
- Pamplona Atta (Northern Cagayan Negrito): spoken in Pamplona, Cagayan; similar to northern Ibanag
- Pudtol Atta: spoken in Pudtol, Apayao, and the Abulog river area south of Pamplona

Villa Viciosa Atta, supposed once spoken in Villaviciosa, Abra, is presumed to be related, but is unattested.

Reid (1994) also reports the following locations for Southern Cagayan Agta.

- Minanga, Peñablanca, Cagayan
- Conyan, Minanga, Peñablanca, Cagayan
- Sapinit, Maconacon, Isabela
- Makagaw (Dupaninan), Cagayan
