= Northeastern Luzon languages =

Subgroup of the Austronesian language family

Northeastern Luzon
- Geographic distribution: Northeastern Luzon
- Linguistic classification: Austronesian: Malayo-Polynesian; Philippine; Northern Luzon; Northeastern Luzon

Language codes
- ISO 639-3: –
- Glottolog: nort3187

The Northeastern Luzon languages is a primary subgroup of the Northern Luzon languages, proposed by Robinson & Lobel (2013) based on historical phonology, functors, and lexicon.

== Classification ==
Robinson & Lobel (2013:148) propose the following internal subgrouping for the Northeastern Luzon languages.

- Northeastern Luzon
  - Dupaningan Agta
  - (core)
    - Dinapigue Agta
    - Casiguran Agta, Nagtipunan Agta
    - Pahanan Agta, Paranan
