= Cagayan Valley and Caraballo ethnolinguistic groups =

Cagayan Valley and Caraballo groups
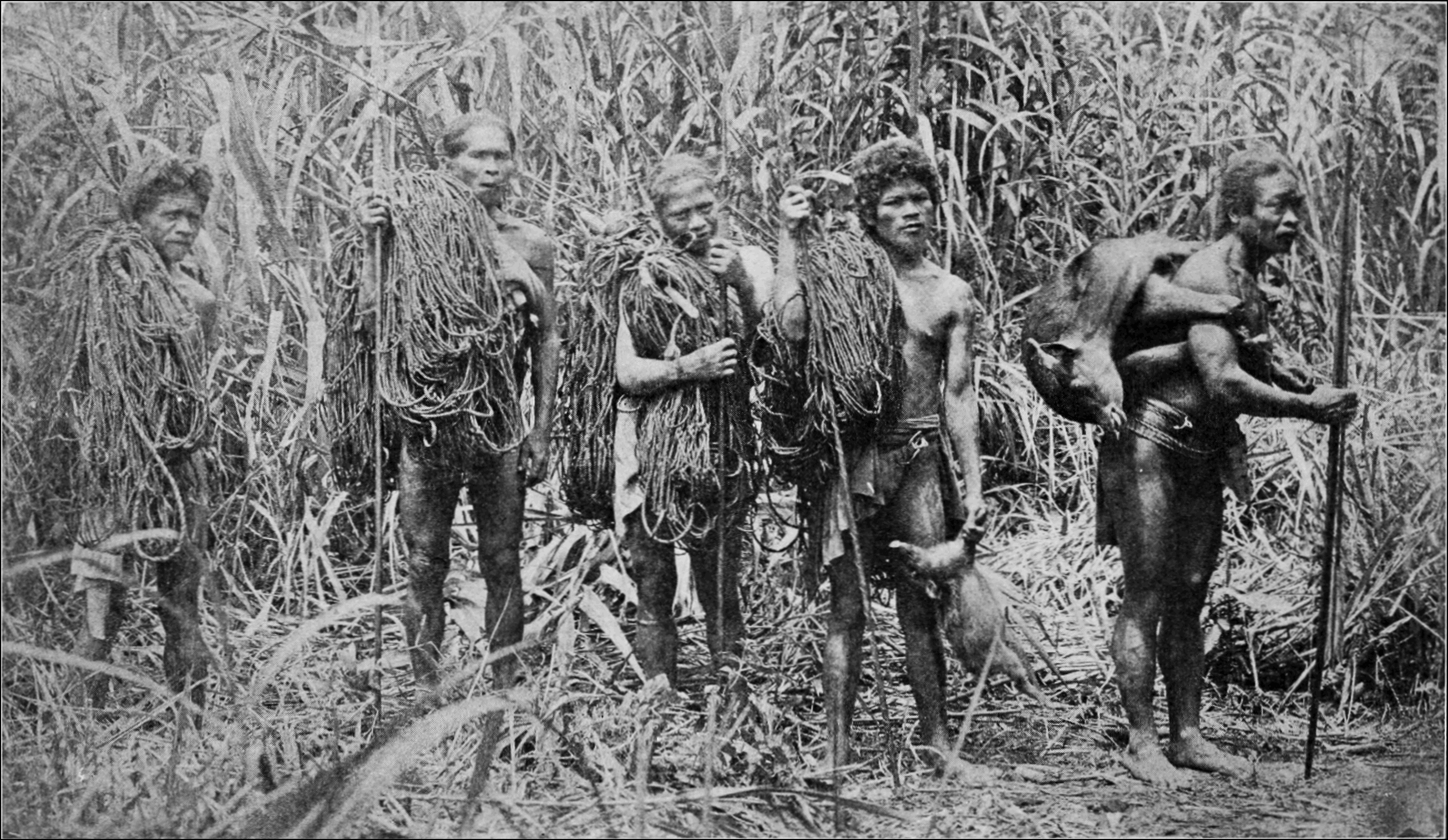
- Early photos of the Bugkalot tribe, Ilongot hunting party

Total population
- 785,830

Regions with significant populations
- Philippines (Cagayan Valley, Central Luzon)

Languages
- Bugkalot, Ilocano, Ibanag, Itawis, Isnag, Yogad, Bugkalot, Malaweg, Isinai, Filipino, English

Religion
- Christianity (Catholicism, Protestantism), Animism (Indigenous Philippine folk religions), Islam

The Cagayan Valley and Caraballo ethnolinguistic groups are a collection of indigenous peoples primarily residing in the Cagayan Valley region and the Caraballo and Sierra Madre mountain ranges of northern Luzon, Philippines. Unlike the Igorot people of the Cordillera Central, these groups do not share a common exonym and identify as distinct ethnic entities with their own unique cultures, languages, and traditions.

== Groups ==
The Cagayan Valley and Caraballo groups are composed of the following:

- Ilongot (Bugkalot): Inhabitants of the southern Sierra Madre and Caraballo Mountains. Their language, Bogkalot, is classified as a threatened language (EGIDS 6b) with 5,710 speakers recorded in the 2010 census.
- Isinai: A small ethnic group primarily found in the municipalities of Bambang, Dupax del Sur, and Aritao in Nueva Vizcaya.
- Isnag (Isneg): Residents of Apayao who, while located in the Cordillera Administrative Region, are linguistically related to the Cagayan Valley branch.
- Ibanag: A major ethnolinguistic group primarily found in the provinces of Cagayan and Isabela.
- Itawis (Itawit): A group closely related to the Ibanag, primarily found in Cagayan province.
- Gaddang: Found primarily in the provinces of Isabela and Nueva Vizcaya.
- Malaweg: Primarily residing in the municipality of Rizal, Cagayan.
- Yogad: Primarily residing in Echague and nearby municipalities in Isabela.

== Ethnic groups ==
=== Ilongot ===
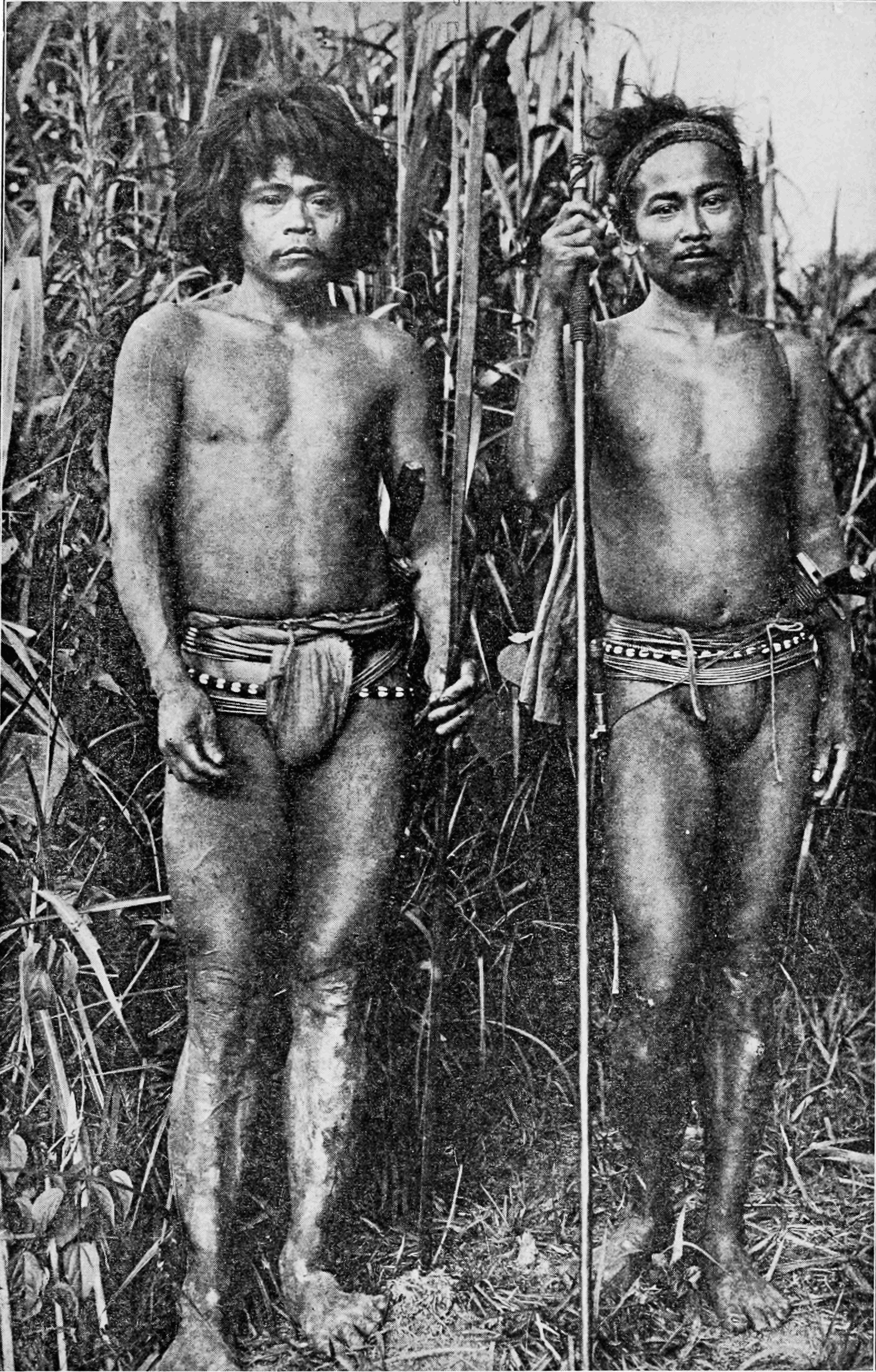
Ilongot men also known as Bugkalot circa 1910, wearing traditional attire and accessories.

The Ilongot (Bugkalot) are a tribe who inhabit the southern Sierra Madre and Caraballo Mountains, on the east side of Luzon in the Philippines, primarily in the provinces of Nueva Vizcaya and Nueva Ecija and along the mountain border between the provinces of Quirino and Aurora. An alternative name of this tribe and its language is "Bugkalot". They are known as a tribe of headhunters. Presently, there are about 18,000 Ilongots. The Ilongots tend to inhabit areas close to rivers, as they provide a food source and a means for transportation. Their native language is the Ilongot language, the number of speakers is reported to be at 5,710 according to the 2010 census, classifying the language as threatened (EGIDS 6b). They also speak the Ilocano & Tagalog languages, the latter is spoken in Nueva Ecija & Aurora as much as Ilocano.

=== Isinai ===
The Isinai/Isinay are a small ethnic group living in the Cagayan Valley, specifically in the municipalities of Bambang, Dupax del Sur, Aritao in Nueva Vizcaya, as well as around Quirino province, and in the northern areas of Nueva Ecija and Aurora. Their ethnic communities show a decline in population, with only around 12,600 members on record. They speak the Isinai language (also spelled Isinay), which is a Northern Luzon language primarily spoken in Nueva Vizcaya province in the northern Philippines. By linguistic classification, it is more divergent from other South-Central Cordilleran languages, such as Kalinga, Itneg or Ifugao and Kankanaey.

=== Ibanag ===
The Ibanags are a predominantly Christian lowland ethnic group numbering around half a million people and who primarily inhabit the provinces of Cagayan and Isabela in the Cagayan Valley of northern Luzon. They speak the Ibanag language, which is distantly related to Ilocano, which they speak as second language.

=== Itawes/Itawis/Itawit ===
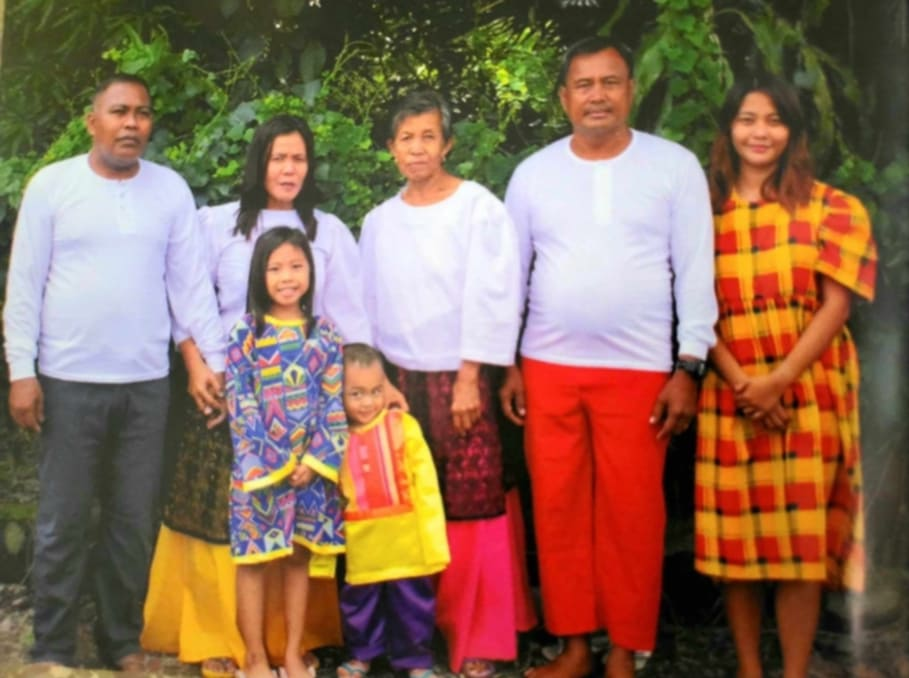
A typical Itawes family in their native attire

The Itawes/Itawis/Itawit are among the earliest inhabitants of the Cagayan Valley in northern Luzon. Their name is derived from the Itawes prefix i- meaning "people of" and tawid or "across the river". As well as their own Itawis language, they speak Ibanag and Ilocano. The contemporary Itawes are charming, friendly, and sociable. They are not very different from other lowland Christianized Filipino ethnic groups in terms of livelihood, housing, and traditions. Their traditional dresses are colorful with red being the dominant color. Farming is a leading source of livelihood. The average families are education-conscious.

=== Malaweg ===
The Malaweg are located in sections of Cagayan Valley and Kalinga-Apayao provinces and in the town of Rizal. Their main crops are lowland rice and corn. Tobacco was raised as a cash crop on a foothill west of Piat on the Matalag river near the southeast border of Kalinga-Apayao province, drawing Ibanags from the east. Culturally, they are similar to the neighbor groups: Ibanag and Itawis. Linguistically, they speak a dialect of Itawis.

=== Gaddang ===
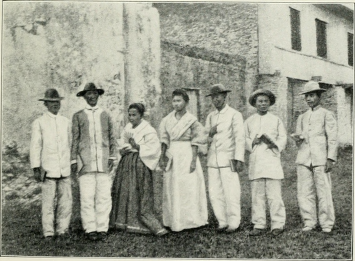
Northern Luzon natives, c. 1906

The Gaddang number about 25,000. They are known to have inhabited the upper Cagayan Valley and the Magat valley below Aritao in Nueva Vizcaya and in Isabela since before the Spanish arrived. Main centers of their language are found in Ilagan, Santiago, Cauayan, Solano, Bagabag, and Bayombong, as well as surrounding towns. Speakers from each municipality have significantly characteristic vocabulary, usage, and pronunciation, although they understand each other well. Their language is related to Ibanag and Itawis; it is also spoken by ethnically related highland Ga'dang in the provinces of Ifugao Province, Kalinga Province, and Mountain Province.

=== Yogad ===
The Yogad are 15.00% christian and are one of the smallest minority groups in the region of the Cagayan Valley. They once occupied Diffun, Quirino in Cagayan Valley. Today, they are concentrated in Echague, Camarag, Angadanan, Santiago, and Jones, Isabela. Yogads speak the Yogad language, which is one of the five recognized dialects of Gaddang, and are identified as part of the Christianized Kalingas in western Isabela.

=== Isneg ===
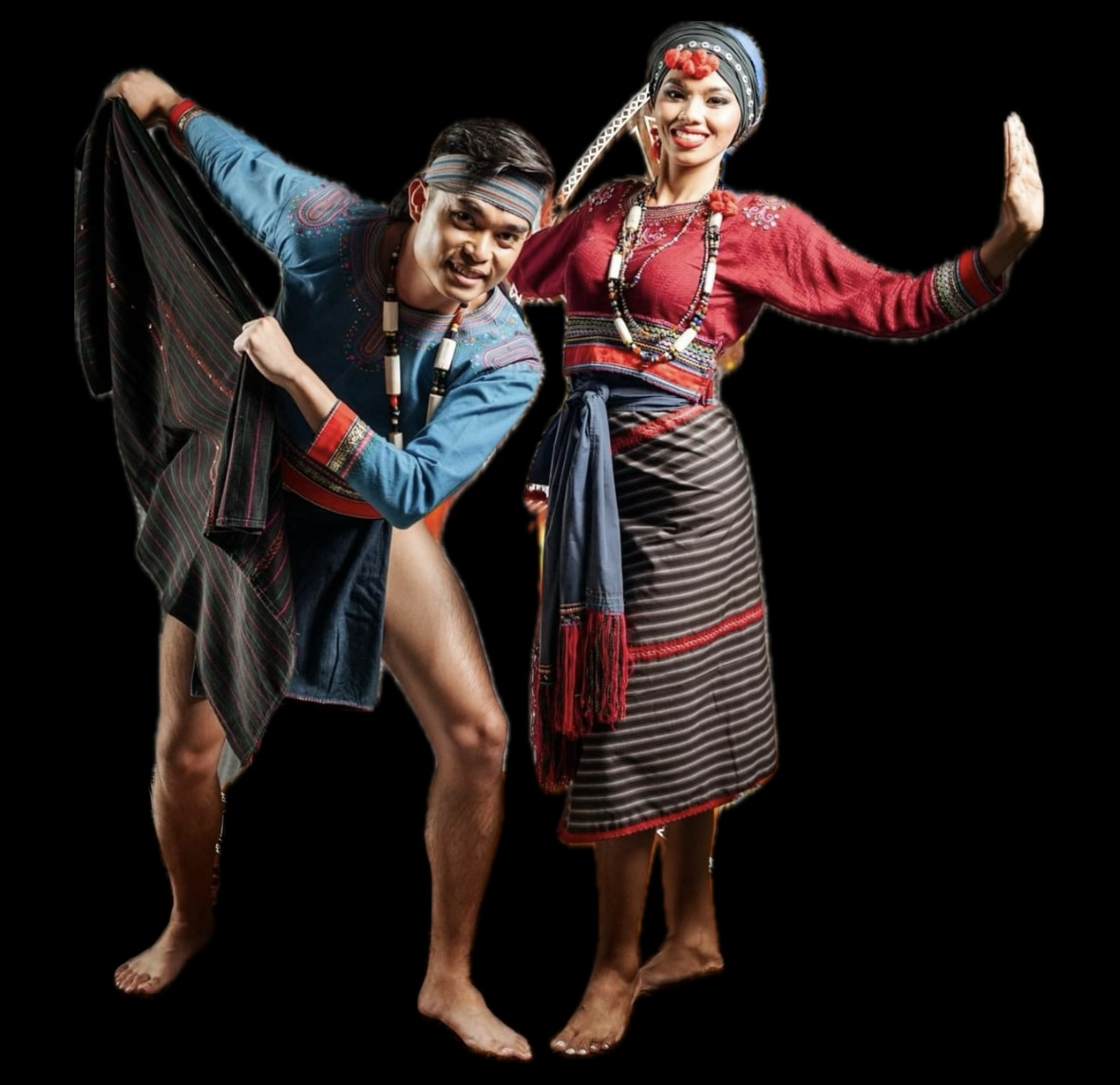
Isnag from Imanllod sub-tribe in their traditional attire

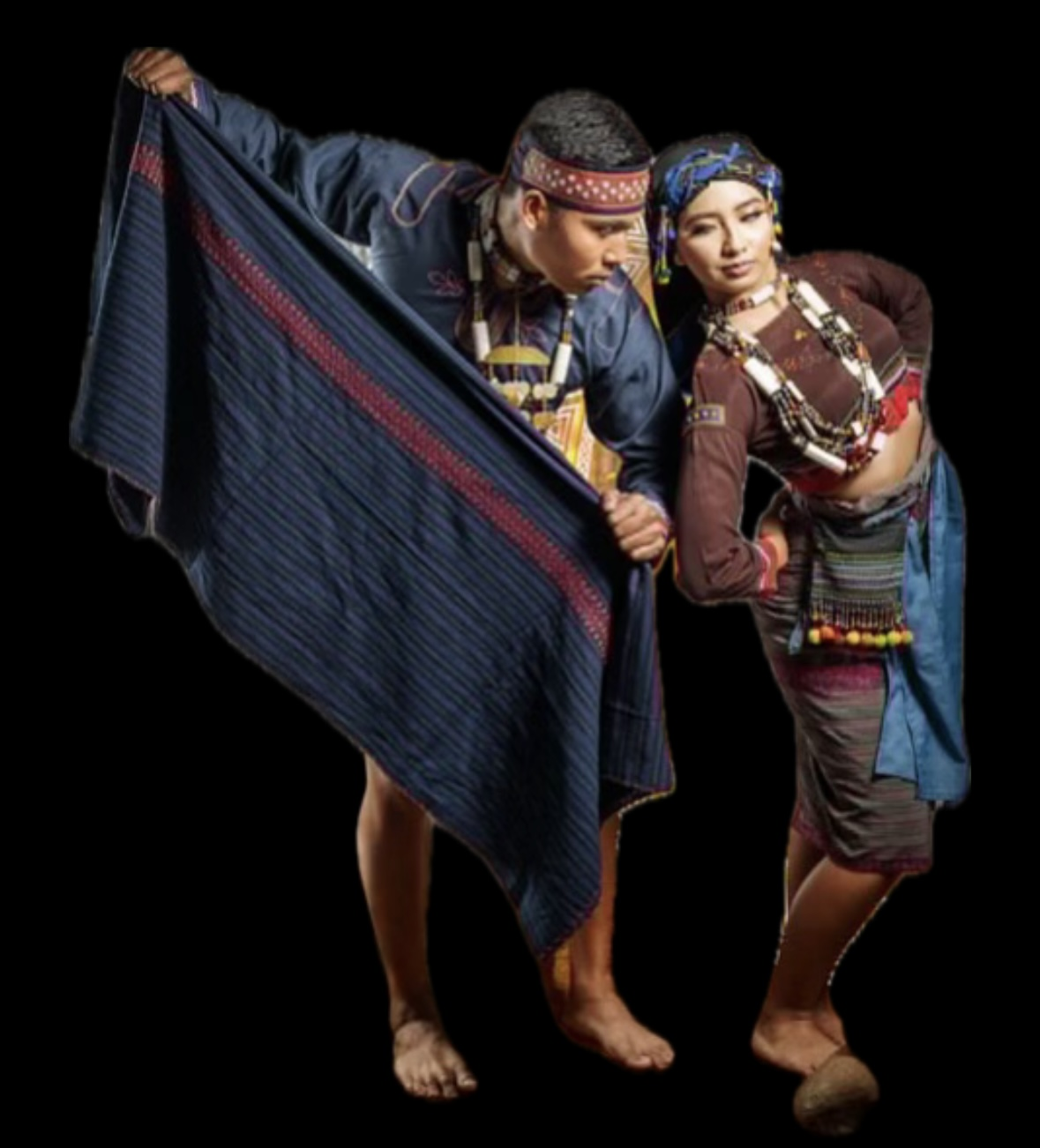
Isnag from Ymandaya sub-tribe in their traditional attire

The Isnag, also Isneg or Apayao, live at the northwesterly end of northern Luzon, in the upper half of the Cordillera province of Apayao. The term "Isneg" derives from itneg, meaning inhabitants of the Tineg River. Apayao derives from the battle cry Ma-ap-ay-ao as their hand is clapped rapidly over their mouth. They may also refer to themselves as Imandaya if they live upstream, or Imallod if they live downstream. The municipalities in the Isneg domain include Pudtol, Kabugao, Calanasan, Flora, Conner, Sta. Marcela, and Luna. Isnag populations also live in the eastern area of the province of Ilocos Norte, specifically the municipalities of Adams, Carasi, Marcos, Dingras, Vintar, Dumalneg and Solsona; and in the Northwestern part of the province of Cagayan, specifically the municipalities of Santa Praxedes, Claveria, Pamplona and Sanchez Mira. Two major river systems, the Abulog River and the Apayao River, run through Isnag country.

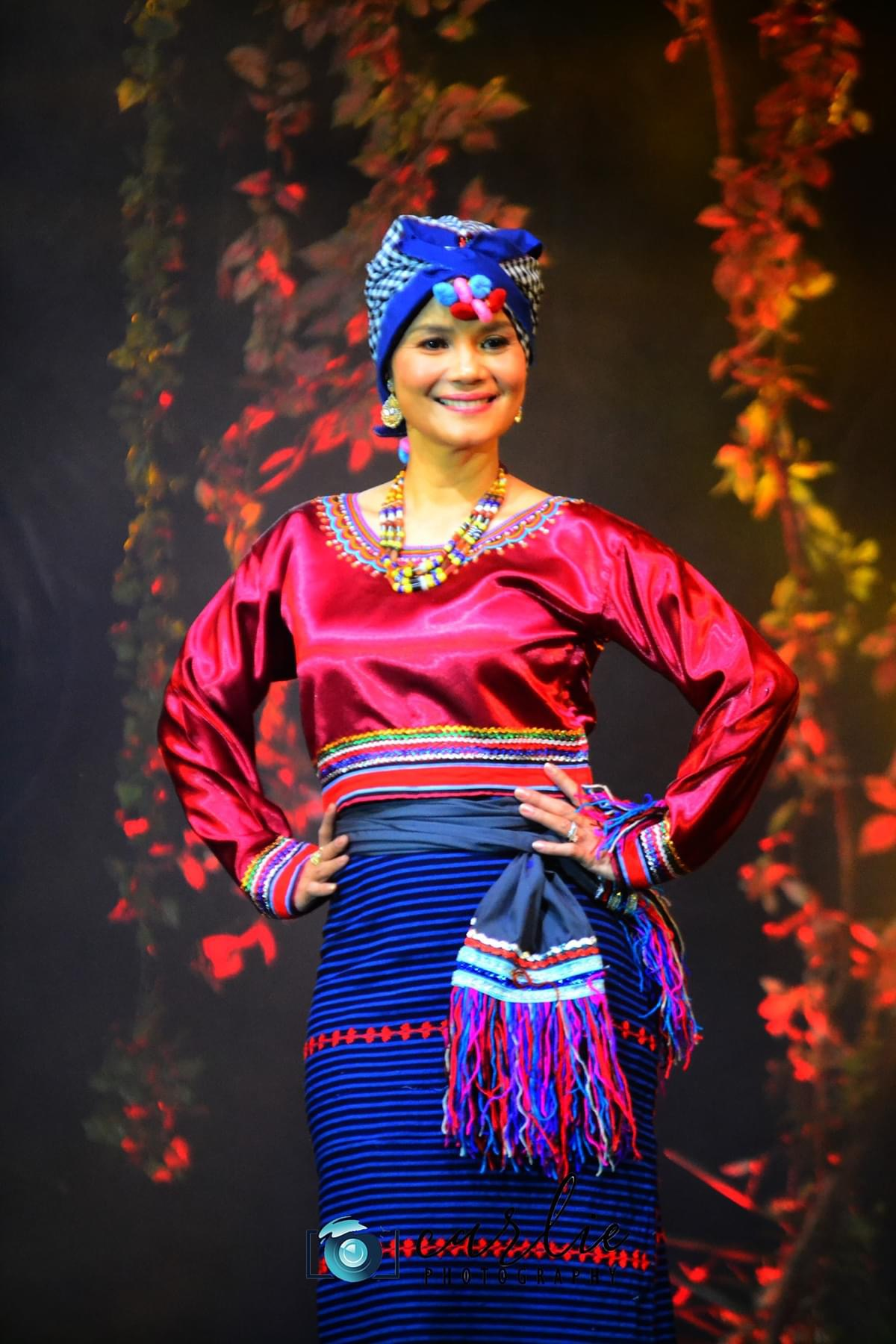
Isnag (Apayao) woman in traditional attire, wearing sinulpo (upper garment) and aken (wraparound cloth).

Jars of basi are half-buried in the ground within a small shed, abulor, constructed of 4 posts and a shed. This abulor is found within the open space, linong or sidong, below their houses (balay). They grow upland rice, while also practicing swidden farming and fishing.

Say-am was an important ceremony after a successful headhunting, or other important occasions, hosted by the wealthy, and lasting one to five days or more. Dancing, singing, eating, and drinking mark the feast, and Isnegs wear their finest clothes. The shaman, Anituwan, prays to the spirit Gatan, before the first dog is sacrificed, if a human head had not been taken, and offered at the sacred tree, ammadingan.

On the last day, a coconut is split in honor of the headhunter guardian, Anglabbang.The Pildap is an equivalent say-am but hosted by the poor. Conversion to Christianity grew after 1920, and today, the Isnegs are divided in their religious beliefs, with some still being animistic.

== Ethnic groups by linguistic classification ==
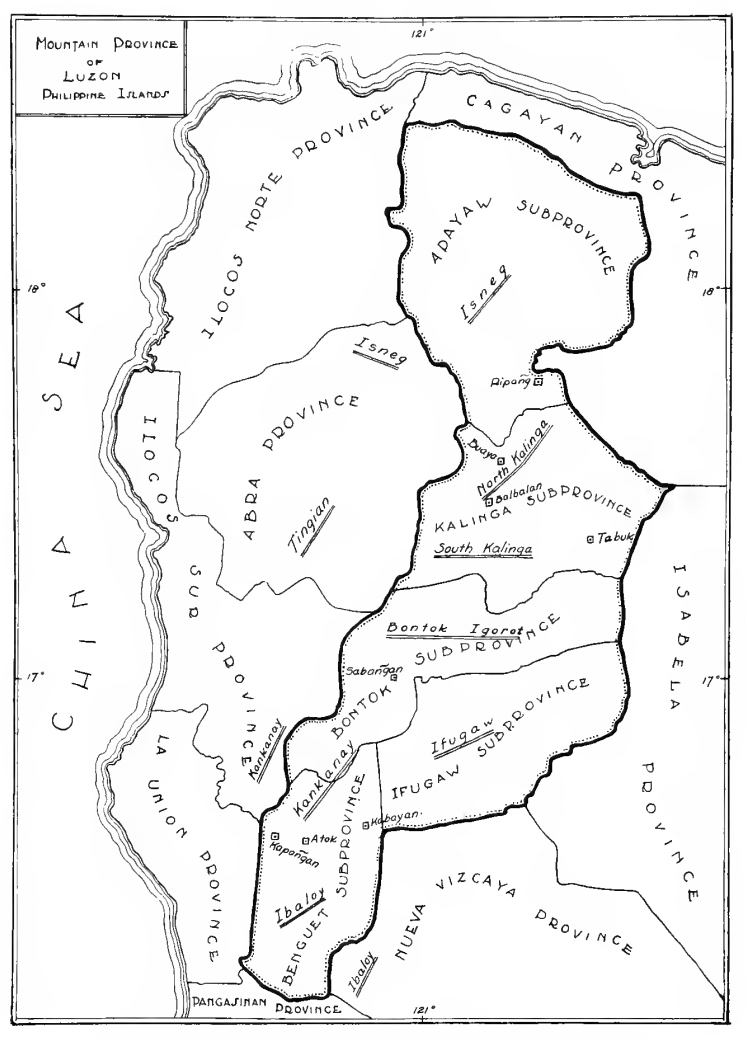
Map of various Cordilleran tribes (1929)

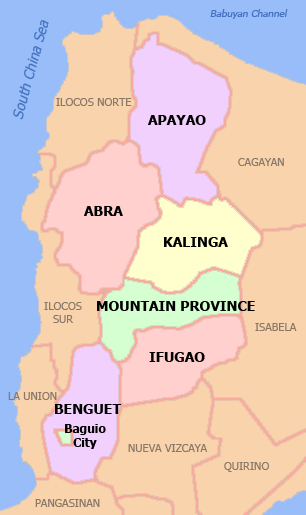
Political map of the Cordillera Administrative Region

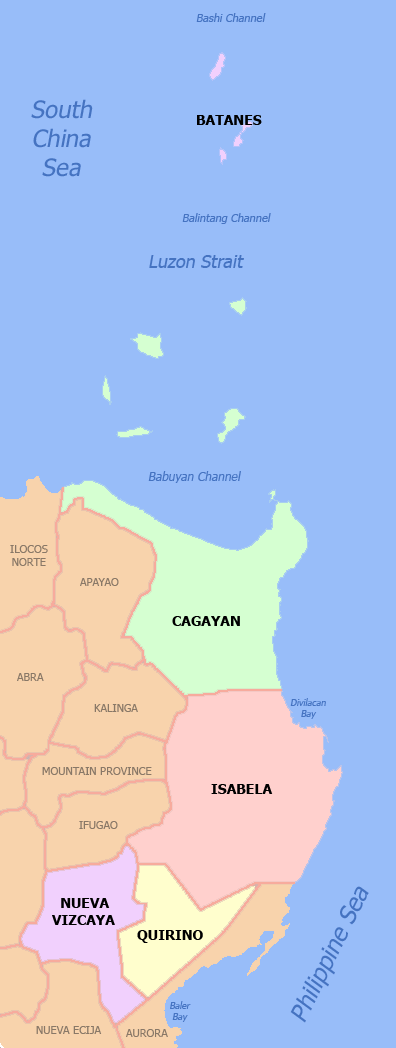
Political map of Cagayan Valley

- Northern Luzon languages
  - Ilokano (Ilocos Norte, Ilocos Sur, and La Union)
  - Northern Cordilleran
    - Isneg (northern Apayao)
    - Ibanagic
      - Ibanag (Cagayan and Isabela)
      - Gaddangic
        - Gaddang (Nueva Vizcaya and Isabela)
        - Ga'dang (Mountain Province, Ifugao, Kalinga Province, Aurora and Nueva Vizcaya)
        - Itawis (southern Cagayan and Apayao)
        - Yogad (Isabela)
  - Central Cordilleran
    - Isinai (northern Nueva Vizcaya, north Nueva Ecija, northwest Aurora)
    - Kalinga–Itneg
      - Kalinga (Kalinga)
      - Itneg (Abra)
    - Nuclear
      - Ifugao (Ifugao)
      - Balangao (eastern Mountain Province)
      - Bontok (central Mountain Province)
      - Kankanaey (western Mountain Province, northern Benguet)
  - Southern Cordilleran
    - Ibaloi (southern Benguet, east La Union, west Nueva Vizcaya)
    - Kalanguya/Kallahan (eastern Benguet, Ifugao, northwestern Nueva Vizcaya, north Nueva Ecija)
      - Kalanguya Keley-i
      - Kalanguya Kayapa
      - Kalanguya Tinoc
    - Karao (Karao, Bokod, Benguet)
    - Bugkalot/Ilongot (eastern Nueva Vizcaya, western Quirino, north Nueva Ecija, northwest Aurora)
    - Pangasinan (Pangasinan)

== Population ==
Population of Cagayan Valley and Caraballo Ethnolinguistic Groups (2020 Census)
Group	Population (2020)	Primary Location	Linguistic Branch
Ibanag	463,390	Cagayan, Isabela	Cagayan Valley
Itawis	289,716	Cagayan	Cagayan Valley
Isnag	50,101	Apayao, Cagayan	Cagayan Valley
Gaddang	44,013	Isabela, Nueva Vizcaya	Cagayan Valley
Yogad	35,777	Isabela	Cagayan Valley
Malaueg	23,450	Cagayan	Cagayan Valley
Bugkalot	18,712	Nueva Vizcaya, Aurora, Quirino	South-Central Cordilleran
Isinai	12,644	Nueva Vizcaya	South-Central Cordilleran
TOTAL	937,803		

== See also ==
- Ethnic groups in the Philippines
- Indigenous peoples of the Philippines
