= Ë =

Latin letter E with two dots

E-umlaut
- Ë ë
- É é, Ẽ ẽ

Usage
- Writing system: Latin script
- Type: alphabet
- Sound values: [ə]; [ɛ]; [iː]; [iəː]; [ɔʏː]; [eu]; [ɘ]; [jo]; [ẽ]; [e]; [ɤu]; [ɤ]; [ɤ̞]; [ʌ]
- In Unicode: U+00CB, U+00EB

History
- Development: E e: Ë ë
- Variations: É é, Ẽ ẽ

Ë (minuscule: ë), known as E with diaeresis or E-umlaut, is a Latin-script letter. It is present in the Albanian, Kashubian, Emilian, Romagnol, Ladin, and Lenape alphabets. As a variant of the letter e, it also appears in Acehnese, Afrikaans, Breton, Dutch, English, Filipino, French, Luxembourgish, Piedmontese, the Abruzzese dialect of the Neapolitan language, and the Ascolano dialect. The letter is also used in Seneca, Taiwanese Hokkien, Turoyo, and Uyghur when written in Latin script.

== Usage in various languages ==
=== Acehnese ===
In Acehnese, ë is used to represent /ə/ (schwa), a mid central vowel.

=== Afrikaans ===
In Afrikaans, the diaeresis (Afrikaans: deelteken, [ˈdiəl.tiəkən]) is used mostly to indicate that two vowels are pronounced separately. The deelteken does exactly what it means in Afrikaans ("separation mark") by marking the beginning of a new syllable and by separating it from the previous one. For example, geëet ("eaten") is pronounced [χəˈiət] in two syllables, the second one beginning with ë.

The deelteken does not always influence the number of syllables. The word voël ("bird"), pronounced [fuəl], is different from voel ("feel"), pronounced [ful], but both words have one syllable. In other cases, the deelteken does not even change the pronunciation. The words geër ("giver") and geer (a wedge-shaped piece of fabric), for instance, are both pronounced [χiər] in contemporary language. Historically, though, words like geër or reën ("rain") were pronounced in two syllables: reën, which nowadays is pronounced [riən], was pronounced as [ˈreː.ən] in older Afrikaans. The deelteken is only etymological since the archaic form of reën is regen.

=== Albanian ===
Ë is the 8th letter of the Albanian alphabet and represents the vowel /ə/, like the pronunciation of the ⟨a⟩ in "ago". It is the fourth most commonly used letter of the language, comprising 7.74 percent of all writings. According to other data, it is the most common letter, comprising 10.290% of writings. In informal writing, the letter is sometimes substituted with a plain e.

=== Armenian ===
Ë is used in the romanization of Classical or Eastern Armenian to represent the letter Ը/ը (ët').

=== Ascolano ===
Ë is a phonetic symbol also used in the transcription of Abruzzese dialects and in the Province of Ascoli Piceno (the Ascolano dialect). It is called "mute E" and sounds like a hummed é. It is important for the prosody of the dialect itself.

=== Dutch ===
In Dutch, ë appears in the plural form of most words that end in -ie or -ee, like kolonie -> koloniën, zee -> zeeën, and knie -> knieën (Dutch-language rules stipulate an extra e before the ë in plurals if the accent falls on the syllable containing the ë). This so-called trema indicates that the vowel letter does not form a digraph with the preceding vowel letter but is pronounced separately. For example, koloniën is pronounced [koːˈloːnijə(n)], but kolonien would be pronounced *[koːˈloːnin]. In the case of "Moët" champagne, the two dots over the "e" indicate that the "e" sound should be pronounced separately from the preceding "o". Therefore, "Moët" is pronounced with the "e" sounding as in "bet".

=== Emilian ===
In some peripheral Emilian dialects, ë is used to represent [ə], e.g. strëtt [strətː] "narrow".

=== English ===
Use of the character Ë in the English language is relatively rare. Some publications, such as the American magazine The New Yorker, use it more often than others. It is used to indicate that the e is to be pronounced separately from the preceding vowel (e.g. in the word "reëntry", the feminine name "Chloë" or in the masculine name "Raphaël"), or at all – like in the name of the Brontë sisters, where without diaeresis the final e would be mute.

=== Filipino and other Philippine languages ===
In the Filipino language (Filipíno/Filipino), Ë or ë, only since 2013, represents the schwa vowel sound natively existing in few to some Filipino words from Maranao (Mëranáw/Mëranaw), Pangasinan (Panggasinán/Pangasinan), and Ilocano (Ilokáno/Ilokano) languages that are also words in Filipino. Such is the case among few to some other Filipino words from other languages in the Philippines that natively have this vowel sound (e.g. Karay-a (Karáy-a/Kinaray-a), Cuyonon (Kuyónon/Kuyonon), Kankanaey (Kankanáëy/Kankanay), and Ibaloi (Ibalóy/Ibaloy) languages) and that are also words in Filipino.

Before the introduction of this variant of the letter Ee in the Filipino language's orthography, the schwa vowel sound was ambiguously represented by either the letter A / a or E / e.

Since stressed vowels are marked with an acute accent (Éé), the Ë / ë, when stressed, will become Ë́ / ë́.

Some Philippine languages use the letter Ë / ë for the vowel /ə/ in native words: Abëllën, Agutaynën, Alta, Boînën, G̓insëlug̓ën Sub̓anën, Hinigaunon, Ibaloy, Isnëg, Itnëg, Kagayanën, Kaluyanën, Kankanaëy, Mëgindënëwn, Mënubu Dulangan, Mënuvu Ubo, Mëranaw, Pangasinan, Paranan, Sangirë, Tëduray, Tinagbanwa. The character is also mentioned in the official orthographies of Itawit, Kalanguya, and Waray.

In several languages the acute indicates a stressed syllable, the grave indicates a vowel followed by a glottal stop and, the circumflex indicates both a vowel with stress and followed by a glottal stop, the ë can also have an acute as Ë́ / ë́ for example in Alta iyë́lgit "eye" or a circumflex as Ë̂ / ë̂ for example in Alta utë̂ "brain".

=== French ===
Ë appears in words like French Noël. Like in Dutch, it is used to indicate that the vowel letter does not form a digraph with the preceding vowel letter but is pronounced separately. For example, Noël is pronounced [nɔɛl], whilst Noel would be pronounced [nwɛl].

=== German ===
E-diaeresis in the word Poësie

Ë does not occur in the official German alphabet. However, a diaeresis above e in German occurs in a few proper names and ethnonyms, such as Ferdinand Piëch, Bernhard Hoëcker, Alëuten, Niuë, Uëa. Without a diaeresis, ie would be [iː] instead of [iə]; eu would be [ɔʏ] instead of [eu] and ae, oe, ue would be alternative representations of respectively ä, ö, ü.

=== Hungarian ===
Ë does not belong to the official Hungarian alphabet, but is usually applied in folklore notations and sometimes also in stylistic writing, e.g. is extensively used in the vocal oeuvre of Kodály. The reason is that open e (close to English hat, cat, cap) and closed ë (close to Spanish e) are distinguished in most spoken dialects, but is not indicated in writing because of the history of writing and due to little but observable areal variation.

=== Kashubian ===
Ë is the 9th letter of the Kashubian alphabet and represents /ə/.

=== Ladin ===
Although not used in standard Ladin, Ë is used in the local variations gherdëina, badiot and fodom. It represents /ɜ/.

=== Latin ===
In many editions of Latin texts, the diaeresis is used to indicate that ae and oe form a hiatus, not a diphthong (in the Classical pronunciation) or a monophthong (in traditional English pronunciations). Examples: aër "air", poëta "poet", coërcere "to coerce".

=== Lenape ===
In the Lenape language, the letter ë is used to represent the schwa vowel. An example of its use is the word mikwën, which means "feather". It can also be found in more complex words, such as ntëmpëm, which means "my brain".

=== Luxembourgish ===
In Luxembourgish, ë is used to indicate stressed schwa /ə/ as in the word ëmmer [ˈəmɐ] ("always"). Otherwise, a stressed e is pronounced as [æ] (e.g. sechs [zæks] ("six")), [ɛ] (e.g. Verb [vɛχp] ("verb")) or [eː] (e.g. Prefix [ˈpʀeːfiks] ("prefix")).

It is also used to indicate an unstressed schwa in the following cases:

1. Before or after a double ee, pronounced [eː], to indicate that the ë does not form a digraph with the preceding or following vowel letter but is pronounced separately, for example: gëeegent [ɡəˈʔeːʑənt] ("suitable"), Eeër [ˈeːɐ] ("eggs") or leeën [ˈleːən] ("to lay"). This also applies to French loanwords ending in -ée, e.g. Musée [ˈmyːzeː] ("museum"), n-plural: Muséeën [ˈmyːzeːən], n-less plural: Muséeë [ˈmyːzeːə]. About usage of plural forms with and without -n, see Eifeler Regel.
2. To indicate that the word-final -e is pronounced in the n-less plural form of words whose singular ends in a mute -e, e.g. Orange [ˈoʀɑ̃ːʃ] ("orange", singular), Orangen [ˈoʀɑ̃ːʃən] (plural with -n), Orangë [ˈoʀɑ̃ːʃə] (plural without -n).
3. In feminine nouns with a word-final mute -e denoting a female person, an extra ë is added in the plural to distinguish it from the plural of the corresponding masculine noun:
  - Cliente [ˈkliɑ̃ːt] ("customer" [female], feminine, singular), Clienteën [ˈkliɑ̃ːtən] (plural with -n), Clienteë [ˈkliɑ̃ːtə] (plural without -n) vs.
  - Client [ˈkliɑ̃ː] ("customer" [male or gender-neutral], masculine, singular), Clienten [ˈkliɑ̃ːən] (plural with -n), Clientë [ˈkliɑ̃ːə] (plural without -n).
4. In the corresponding masculine nouns the diaeresis is used in the n-less plural form to distinguish it from the singular of the corresponding feminine noun: Clientë [ˈkliɑ̃ːə] ("customers" [male or gender-neutral], masculine, plural without -n) vs. Cliente [ˈkliɑ̃ːt] ("customer" [female], feminine, singular).

=== Mayan languages ===
In the modern orthography of Mayan languages, the letter Ë represents /ə/.

=== Piedmontese ===
Ë represents the mid central vowel /ə/ in the modern orthography of Piedmontese language.

=== Proto-Finnic ===
Ë is used in the linguistic reconstructions of Proto-Finnic to denote a mid back unrounded vowel [ɤ~ɤ̞~ʌ] the back counterpart to [e] for Proto-Finnic's system of vowel harmony. It is also used in the allophonic diphthong [ɤu] – ëu.

=== Quenya ===
In the constructed language Quenya, a diaeresis indicates that a vowel is not part of a diphthong, for example in ëa or ëo. Final ë is also marked with a diaeresis to remind English-speakers that it is not silent.

=== Romagnol ===
Ë is used in Romagnol to represent [ɛː~ɛə], e.g. fradël [fraˈdɛəl~fraˈdɛːl] "brother".

=== Russian ===
In some Latin transliterations of Russian such as ISO 9, ë is used for its homoglyph ё, representing a /jo/, as in Potëmkin to render the Cyrillic Потёмкин. Other translations use yo, jo or (ambiguously) simply e.

=== Syriac ===
In the romanization of Syriac, the letter Ë gives a schwa. In some grammatical constructions, it is a replacement for the other, original vowels (a, o, e, i, u). Example words that have Ë: knoṭër ("he is waiting"), krëhṭi ("they are running"), krëqdo ("she is dancing"), ŝërla ("she has closed"), gfolëḥ ("he will work"), madënḥo ("east"), mën ("what"), ašër ("believe"). Turoyo and Assyrian languages may utilize this diacritic, albeit rarely.

=== Seneca ===
In Seneca, the letter Ë is used to represent /ẽ/, a close-mid front unrounded nasalized vowel.

=== Tagalog ===
In the Tagalog language and in and from its de facto standardized form of or as the Filipino language, Ë or ë, only since 2013, is used to represent the schwa vowel sound, particularly in non-native Tagalog loanwords from the other languages of the Philippines and, specifically and especially in the case of Tagalog, from or through either themselves or Filipino, or both, such as from Maranao (Mëranaw), Pangasinan (Panggasinan/Pangasinan), Ilocano (Ilokano), Karay-a (Karay-a/Kinaray-a), Cuyonon (Kuyonon), Kankanaey (Kankanaëy/Kankanay), and Ibaloi (Ibaloy).

Before the introduction of this letter Ee variant of and from Filipino's orthography, the schwa vowel sound was ambiguously represented by either the letter A / a or E / e in Tagalog.

=== Uyghur ===
Ë is the 6th letter of the Uyghur Latin alphabet and represents close-mid front unrounded vowel /e/ (while plain E stands for /ɛ/ or /æ/).

== Character mappings ==
Character information
Preview	Ë		ë	
Unicode name	LATIN CAPITAL LETTER E WITH DIAERESIS		LATIN SMALL LETTER E WITH DIAERESIS	
Encodings	decimal	hex	dec	hex
Unicode	203	U+00CB	235	U+00EB
UTF-8	195 139	C3 8B	195 171	C3 AB
Numeric character reference	&#203;	&#xCB;	&#235;	&#xEB;
Named character reference	&Euml;		&euml;	

== See also ==
- Two dots (diacritic)
- Yo, a Cyrillic homoglyph
