= Isinai language =

Austronesian language spoken in the Philippines

Isinai
- Isinay
- Native to: Philippines
- Region: Luzon
- Native speakers: 5,000 (2010 census)
- Language family: Austronesian: Malayo-Polynesian; Philippine; Northern Luzon; Meso-Cordilleran; Central Cordilleran; Nuclear Cordilleran; Bontok–Balangao; Isinai

Language codes
- ISO 639-3: inn
- Glottolog: isin1239
- ELP: Isinay
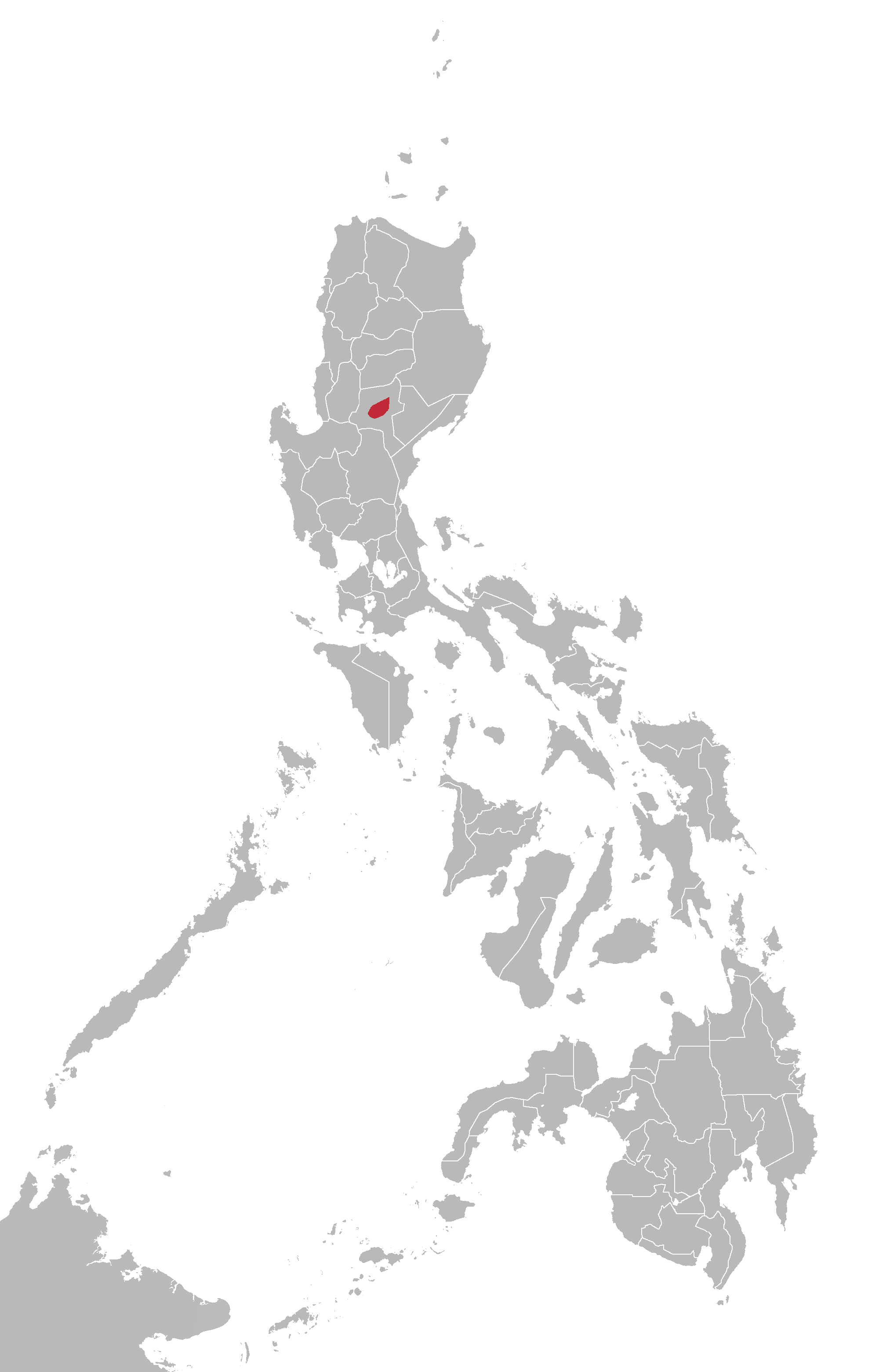
- Area where Isinai is spoken

Isinai (also spelled Isinay) is a Northern Luzon language primarily spoken in Nueva Vizcaya province in the northern Philippines. By linguistic classification, it is more divergent from other Central Cordilleran languages, such as Kalinga, Itneg or Ifugao and Kankanaey.

According to the Ethnologue, Isinai is spoken in Bambang, Dupax del Sur, and Aritao municipalities, alongside Ilocano.

== Dialects ==
Ethnologue reports Dupax del Sur, Aritao and Bambang as dialects of Isinai. However, Ethnologue also reports that the Aritao dialect is moribund.

== Phonology ==
Vowel phonemes
| | Front | Back |
|---|---|---|
| High | i | |
| Mid | e | o |
| Close | a | |

Consonants
| | | Labial | Alveolar | Palatal | Velar | Glottal |
|---|---|---|---|---|---|---|
| Nasal | | m | n | ɲ | ŋ | |
| Plosive/ Affricate | voiceless | p | t | tʃ | k | ʔ |
| Plosive/ Affricate | voiced | b | d | dʒ | ɡ | ʔ |
| Fricative | | f v | s | ʃ | | h |
| Approximant | | | l | j | w | |
| Tap | | | ɾ | | | |

Isinai is also one of the Philippine languages which is excluded from [ɾ]-[d] allophone.

== Grammar ==
Isinai contains a definite article with three different forms that vary depending on the relation of the noun. The forms of the definite article are: ar, ardari, and war.
