= Kalinga Butbut language =

Kalinga dialect of the Philippines

Butbut Kalinga
- Native to: Cordillera Administrative Region
- Native speakers: 15,000 (2008)
- Language family: Austronesian: Malayo-Polynesian; Philippine; Northern Luzon; Meso-Cordilleran; Central Cordilleran; Kalinga-Itneg; Butbut Kalinga

Language codes
- ISO 639-3: kyb
- Glottolog: butb1235

Butbut Kalinga is a language of the Kalinga dialect continuum. Ethnologue reports 15,000 speakers of the language and 1,000 monolinguists.

== Distribution ==
Ethnologue reports that Butbut Kalinga is spoken in the following areas:

Cordillera Administrative Region: Kalinga province: Tinglayan municipality: Bugnay, Buscalan, Butbut Proper, Loccong, and Ngibat villages; Tabuk, Dinongsay, Ileb, Kataw, Lacnog, and Pakak villages; Rizal Municipality: Andaraya, Anonang, Bua, and Malapiat villages.

== Similarities ==
Ethnologue reports the following similarities with other Philippine languages, Namely: Limos Kalinga, Ilocano, Tanudan Kalinga, Bangad Kalinga (Southern Kalinga).

== Lexical similarities with other languages ==
Ethnologue reports that the language is Lexically similar with some languages and dialects:

82% of Southern Kalinga and 78% with Guina-ang (a dialect of Tanudan Kalinga), and Tanudan Kalinga.

== Typology ==
Ethnologue reports the following typology for this language:

VSO; Prepositions; Genitives after noun heads; articles normally before adjectives, numerals and noun heads; question-word in sentence-initial position; 3 maximum suffixes;

word order distinguishes subjects; objects and indirect objects, given and new information, topic and comment; affixes do not indicate case of noun phrases; verb affixes mark number; passives; causatives; comparatives; CV, CVC; nontonal.

== Language use ==
This language is used in Home, community, church. Used by all. Positive attitudes. Most also use Ilocano, which is acquired through school, travel, media, and use in church.

== See also ==
- Ilocano language
- Kalinga language
- Ilocano people
