= Iwaak language =

Austronesian language spoken in the Philippines

Iwaak
- I-wak
- Native to: Philippines
- Region: Luzon
- Native speakers: (3,300 cited 2000)
- Language family: Austronesian: Malayo-Polynesian; Philippine; Northern Luzon; Meso-Cordilleran; Southern Cordilleran; West Southern Cordilleran; Nuclear Southern Cordilleran; Ibaloy; Iwaak

Language codes
- ISO 639-3: iwk
- Glottolog: iwak1237
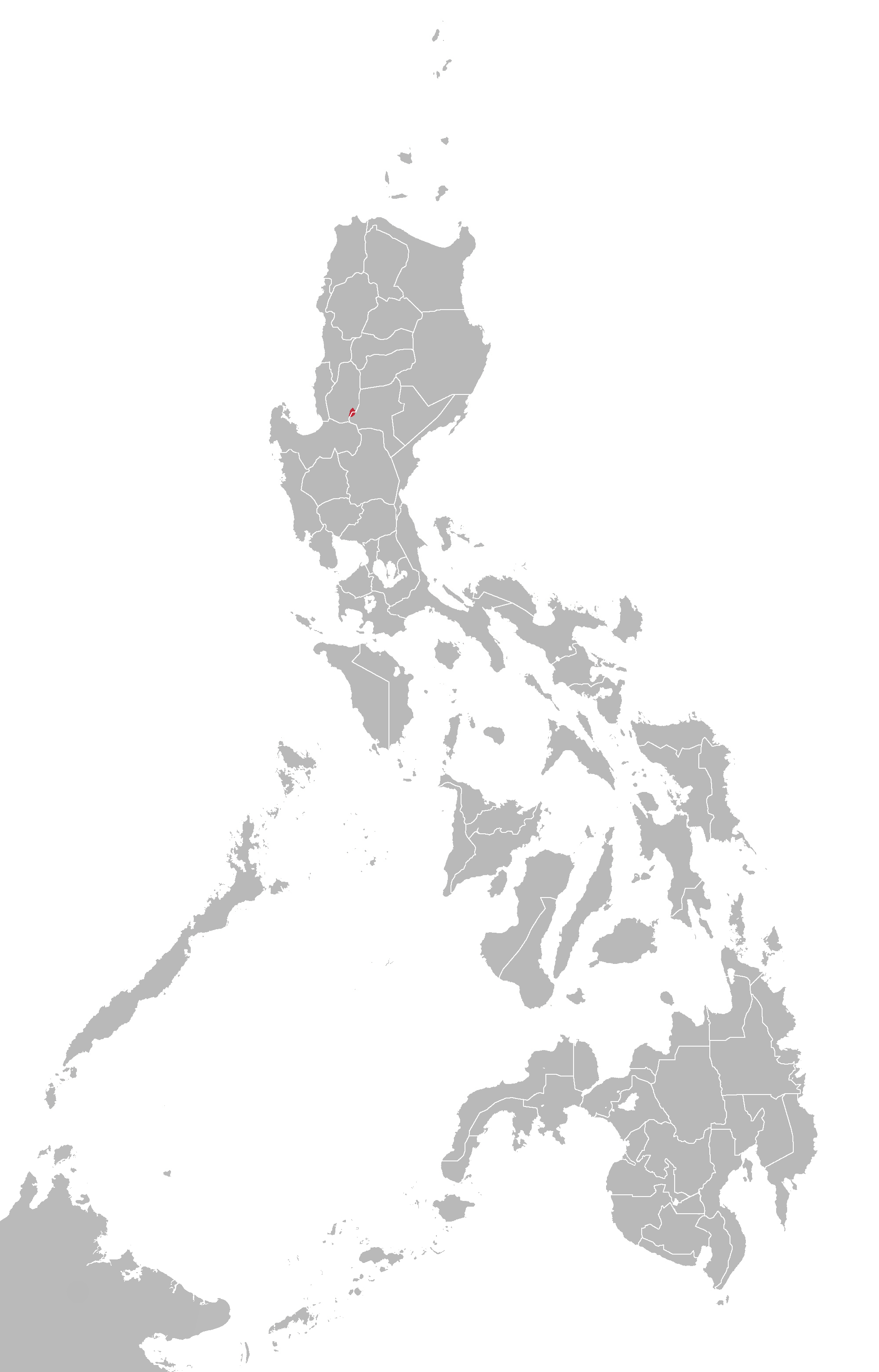
- Area where Iwaak is spoken according to Ethnologue

Iwaak (also spelled I-wak or I'wak) is a South-Central Cordilleran language spoken by almost 3,300 people around the Cordillera Central mountain range of Luzon, Philippines. The Iwaak language is a Nuclear Southern Cordilleran language which is closely related to Ibaloi, Kalanguya, and Karao.

According to Ethnologue, in eastern Itogon municipality, Benguet Province, I-wak is spoken in Tojongan, Bakes, Lebeng, Domolpos, Bujasjas, and Kayo-ko villages. It is also spoken in Salaksak village, Kayapa municipality, Nueva Vizcaya Province.
