= Tuwali language =

Austronesian language spoken in Philippines

Tuwali
- Native to: Philippines
- Region: Kiangan, Ifugao
- Native speakers: (30,000 cited 2000)
- Language family: Austronesian: Malayo-Polynesian; Philippine; Northern Luzon; Meso-Cordilleran; Central Cordilleran; Nuclear Cordilleran; Ifugao; Tuwali
- Writing system: Latin

Official status
- Recognised minority language in: Regional language in the Philippines

Language codes
- ISO 639-3: ifk
- Glottolog: tuwa1243
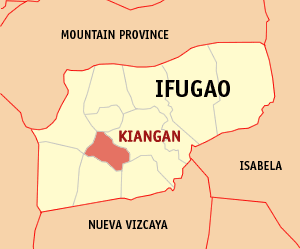
- Ifugao, showing the location of Kiangan

Tuwali language is a native language indigenous to Ifugao. It is mainly spoken in the whole province. Its different varieties distinguish the municipality.

Kiangan is the oldest town in the province. It derives its name from Kiangan, an ancient village near the bank of the Ibulao River across the Lagawe valley.
