= Ifugao (disambiguation) =

Ifugao may refer to:

- Ifugao, a province in the Philippines
  - Ifugao language, an Austronesian language
  - Ifugao people, speakers of the language
- Ifugao River
- Ifugao (film), a 1954 Filipino film directed by Gerardo de León

== See also ==
- Batad (disambiguation)
