= Batad =

Batad may refer to:

- Ifugao language
- Batad, Iloilo, Philippines
- The Batad Rice Terraces, one of the clusters of the Rice Terraces of the Philippine Cordilleras, a UNESCO World Heritage Site

== See also ==
- Ifugao (disambiguation)
