= Alta language =

Alta is a pair of Meso-Cordilleran languages spoken in northern Luzon. As both are primary splits from Proto-South-Central Cordilleran, they are paraphyletic and do not form a subgroup with each other (Reid 2013).

- Northern Alta language
- Southern Alta language
