= Kalanguya language =

Austronesian language spoken in the Philippines

Kalanguya
- Kallahan, Keley-i, Ahin, Mandekey, Mankehang, Kayapa, Hanglulaw
- Region: Luzon, Philippines
- Native speakers: ca. 126,804 (2020 census)
- Language family: Austronesian: Malayo-Polynesian; Philippine; Northern Luzon; Meso-Cordilleran; Southern Cordilleran; West Southern Cordilleran; Nuclear Southern Cordilleran; Kalanguya

Language codes
- ISO 639-3: Either: kak – Kalanguya ify – Keley-i
- Glottolog: kall1244
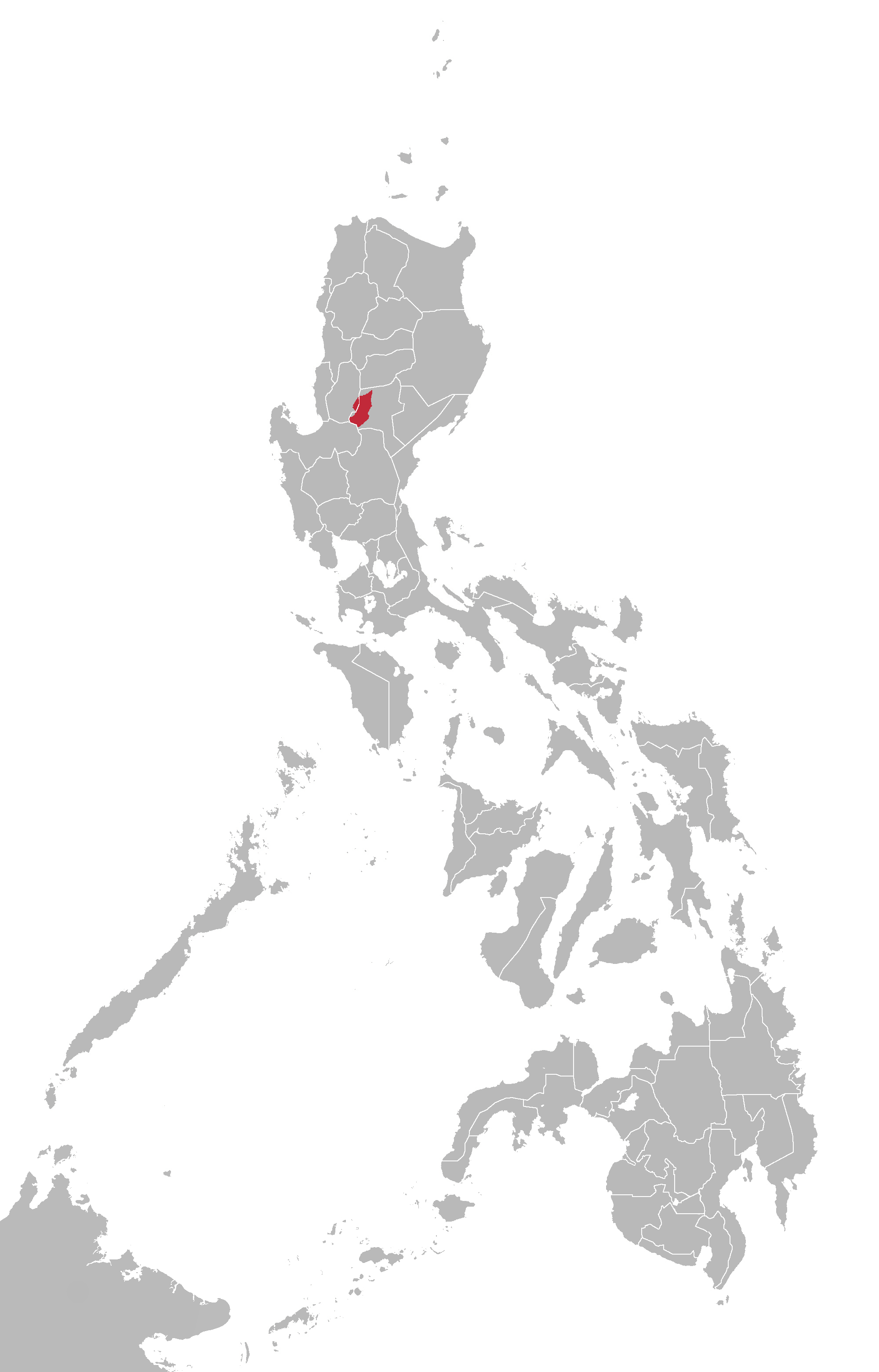
- Area where Kalanguya is spoken according to Ethnologue

Kalanguya, also called Kallahan, is a dialect cluster spoken by the Kalanguya people of northern Luzon, Philippines. The Kalanguya language is closely related to Ibaloi, Karao, and Iwak and is distantly related with Pangasinan and Ilongot. The Kalanguya language is part of the Southern Cordilleran languages of the Northern Luzon languages, which in turn is part of the Malayo-Polynesian languages.

== Distribution ==
Kalanguya (also called Ikalahan, Kalangoya, Kalangoya-Ikalahan, Kallahan, Kayapa) is spoken in the following locations:

- western Nueva Vizcaya Province
- Ifugao Province (Tinoc municipality)
- Benguet Province (Bokod municipality)
- northeastern Pangasinan Province (San Nicolas municipality)
- north Nueva Ecija Province (Carranglan municipality)

The dialects of Kalanguya are

Kalanguya (KLN)
- AHN — Ahin, Tinoc, Ifugao
  DKY — Mandek-ey of Amlimay, Buguias, Benguet
  HNG — Hanglulaw of Amduntog, Asipolo, Ifugao
  KAY — Kayapa Proper, Kayapa, Nueva Vizcaya
  KEH — Mankehang of Sitio Tinudan, Poblacion, Kabayan, Benguet
  KEL — Keley-i of Antipolo, Asipolo, Ifugao

Himes (1998) report the following lexical relationship on basic vocabulary of the Kalanguya dialects with each other:

- Keley-i and Hanglulaw (Northern dialects) - 94%
- Kehang, Mandek-ey, and Kayapa proper (Southern dialects)- 87% - 94%
- Ahin to the Southern dialects - 80% - 86%

The northern dialects are reported to show Ifugao influences while the southern dialects inhibit influences from Ibaloi. Ahin is linguistically considered a third branch, separate from the two.

== Phonology ==
Consonants
	Bilabial	Dental/Alveolar	Palatal	Velar	Uvular	Glottal
Nasal	m	n		ŋ		
Plosive	p b	t d		ɡ	q	ʔ
Fricative						h
Lateral		l				
Glide			j			
