= Balangao language =

Austronesian language spoken in the Philippines

Balangao
- Balangaw
- Native to: Philippines
- Region: Luzon
- Ethnicity: Balangao people
- Native speakers: (21,000 cited 2000)
- Language family: Austronesian: Malayo-Polynesian; Philippine; Northern Luzon; Meso-Cordilleran; Central Cordilleran; Nuclear Cordilleran; Balangao

Language codes
- ISO 639-3: blw
- Glottolog: bala1310
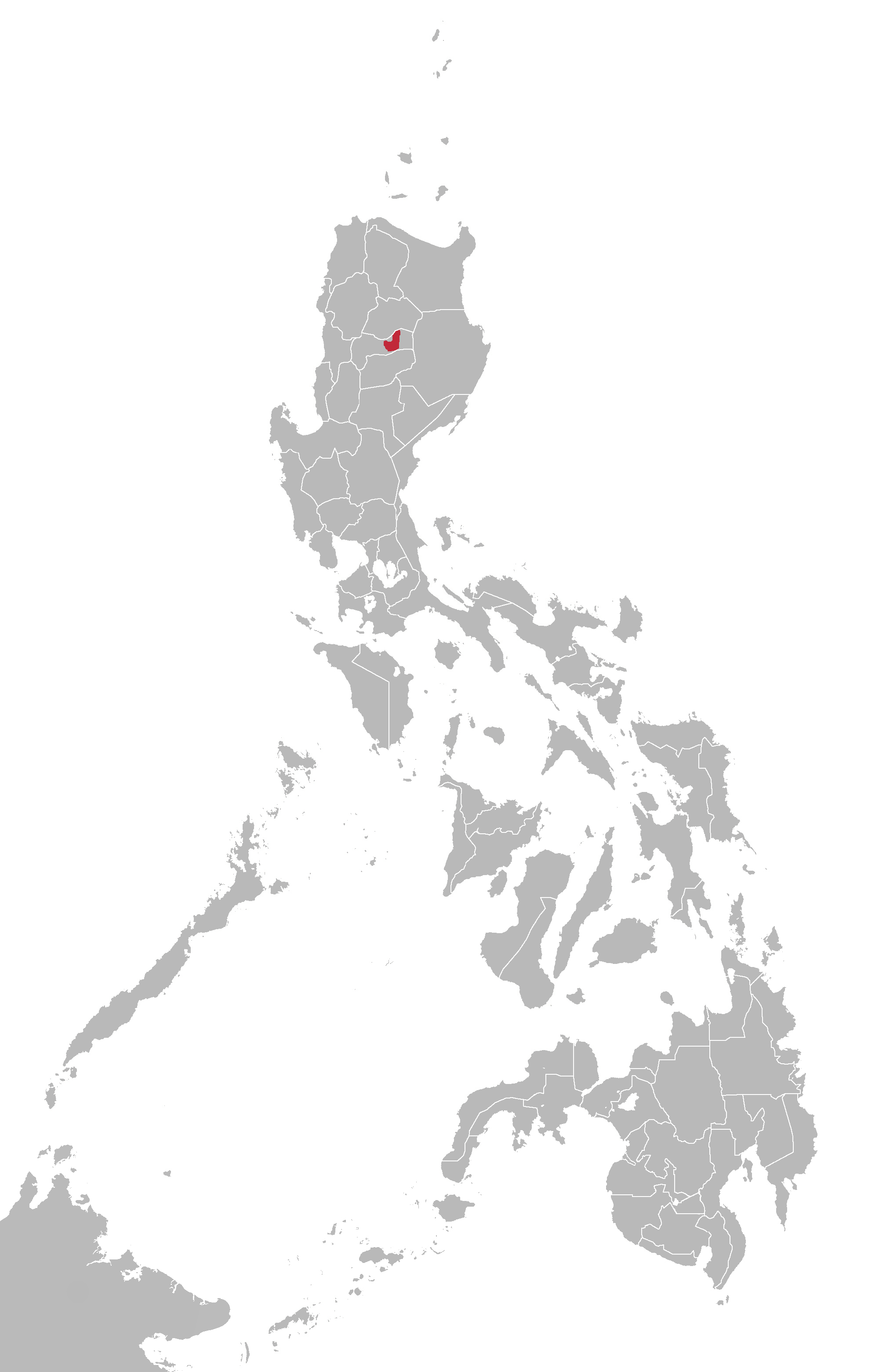
- Area where Balangao is spoken according to Ethnologue

Balangao or Balangaw is an Austronesian language spoken in northern Luzon, Philippines. Balangaw is spoken throughout the municipality of Natonin, with the exception of the barangays of Maducayan and Saliok (where Majukayong Kalinga is spoken) and Barangay Banao (predominantly Kachakran-speaking). It is also spoken in parts of the neighboring municipality of Paracelis by Balangao settlers.

== Phonology ==
Balangao has the following phoneme inventory:

Vowels
	Front	Central	Back
Close	i	ɨ	u
Mid	e		o
Open		a	

The central vowels /a/ and /ɨ/ each have a lowered and a raised allophone, viz. [a]~[ə] for /a/, and [ə]~[ɨ] for /ɨ/.

Consonants
		Bilabial	Alveolar	Palatal	Velar	Glottal
Nasal		m	n		ŋ	
Plosive	voiceless	p	t		k	ʔ
Plosive	voiced	b	d		ɡ	
Fricative			s			h
Approximant			l	j	w	

The voiced stops /b/, /d/ and /g/ have voiceless allophones [f], [t͡ʃ], [kʰ] in syllable position.

== Dialects ==
The Balangao language consists of two primary dialects: Balangao (the prestige variety) and Ha'ki (Shetler,1976). While both dialects are mutually intelligible, they are distinguished by minor lexical differences and distinct phonological shifts.

- Balangao dialect: This is the standard variety used in traditional music, media, and liturgical translations. A defining phonological feature is the realization of the final /a/ as a schwa (ë), a trait shared with the neighboring Mayoyao variety of the Ifugao language.
- Ha'ki dialect: This variety is characterized by the palatalization of the voiceless labiodental fricative /f/ to /fʲ/ (orthographically fy). This feature is a linguistic reflex shared with the neighboring Finallig (Eastern Bontoc) language. This palatalization typically occurs following the vowel /a/.

=== Phonological comparison ===
The primary difference lies in the palatalization of the initial consonant in certain roots.

English	Balangao	Ha'ki	Phonological Note
Stone	fato	fyato	Palatalization of /f/
House	farey	fyarey	Palatalization of /f/
Settlement/Town	fabrey	fyabrey	Palatalization of /f/
Banana	farat	fyarat	Palatalization of /f/
Balangao	Farangao	Fyarangao	Autonym variation

=== Lexical differences ===
English	Linguistic Term	Balangao	Ha'ki
Why	Interrogative	Pakay	Kaya / Kamoh
That (far)	Distal Demonstrative (Singular)	Anchi	Chéy
Those (far)	Distal Demonstrative (Plural)	Anchichay	Chéycha

In usage, these demonstratives function as follows:

- Balangao: Wacha anchichay tataku. (There are those people.)
- Ha'ki: Wacha chéycha tataku. (There are those people.)

== Sample text ==
Text (SIL 1978)	Balangao Speech	English Translation
1. Ad namenamenghan ano, wada hen ihay mad-an way bummabléy ad Losoob.	Ad namenamenhan ano, wacha hen ehay mad-an way funmmafabrey ad Losoob	1. Long, long ago, they say, there was an old woman who lived in Losob.
2. Hiyatoy mad-an, adi masséy hen labi ya hen ag-agaw, ta adina ano ilan hen matéyan hen anàna, te duwada hen anàna way pahig lalae, te enekkatda yag natèy ah amada.	Hiyatoy mad-an, achi massey hen lafi ya hen ag-agaw, ta achina ano ilan hen mateyan hen ana'na, te chuwacha hen ana'na way pahig larae, te enekkatcha yag natey ah amacha.	2. This old woman, she wouldn't sleep night or day so that she wouldn't, they say, see the death of her offspring, because her offspring were two, pure boys, for they were (both) small when their father died.
3. Ah inada yanggay hen wada.	Ah inacha yangkay hen wacha	3. Their mother only was lived.
4. Hen antoy inada, laydéna way adida matéy hen antoy duway anànay enekkat, te maid manal-on an hiya, te da malakay.	Hen antoy inacha, laychena way achicha matey hen antoy chuway ana'nay enekkat, te maid manal-on an hiya, te cha malakay.	4. This their mother, she wanted that these two small offspring of hers would not die, because she had no one to care for her, because she was getting old.
5. Hen abulot hen tatagu ad namenghan, no masséyda, ta in-inpénda hen lawengay in-inép, matéy hen anàda.	Hen afurot hen tataku ad namenghan, no masseycha, ta in-inpencha hen lawechay in-inep, matey hen ana'cha.	5. The belief of people long ago was, if they sleep so that they should dream a bad dream, their offspring would die.
6. Yato hen adi masséyan hen andi mad-an, ta adina ilan hen atéyan anàna.	Yato hen achi masseyan hen anchi mad-an, ta achina ilan hen ateyan ana'na.	6. This was why the old woman would not sleep, so she wouldn't see the death of her offspring.
7. Ya mag hen-algawan ano, i nanggagga-ay hen andi duway unguna way anàna.	Ya mag hen-arkawan ano, i nanggagga-ay hen anchi chuway unguna way ana'na.	7. And so then, one day, they say, those two children who were her offspring went for a walk.
8. Yag hen hiyadi agé, lummigwatda hen eNgawngaw way i mangayaw, yag indahanda hen antoy duway unà hen mad-an...	Yag hen hiyachi ake, lummigwatcha hen eNgawngaw way i mangayaw, yag hen inchahancha hen antoy chuway una' hen mad-an	8. And at that time, too, the people-of-Ngawngaw started out to head-hunt, and they found/came-upon these two offspring of the old woman...
