= Southern Cordilleran languages =

Subgroup of the Austronesian language family

Southern Cordilleran
- Geographic distribution: northern Luzon
- Linguistic classification: Austronesian: Malayo-Polynesian; Philippine; Northern Luzon; Meso-Cordilleran; Southern Cordilleran

Language codes
- Glottolog: sout2907

The Southern Cordilleran languages are a group of closely related languages within the Northern Luzon subgroup of the Austronesian language family. They are spoken in an area stretching from the southern shore of Lingayen Gulf to the highlands of Quirino province. The most widely spoken Southern Cordilleran language is Pangasinan, one of the eight major languages of the Philippines.

== Internal classification ==
The subgroup was first proposed by Zorc (1979). Himes (1998) classifies the Southern Cordilleran languages as follows:

- Southern Cordilleran
  - Ilongot
  - West Southern Cordilleran
    - Pangasinan
    - Nuclear Southern Cordilleran
      - Ibaloi (including Iwak)
      - Karao
      - Kalanguya

== Reconstruction ==
Proto-Southern Cordilleran
- Reconstruction of: Southern Cordilleran languages
- Reconstructed ancestors: Proto-Austronesian: Proto-Malayo-Polynesian; Proto-Philippine; Proto-Northern Luzon

Proto-Southern Cordilleran has been reconstructed by Himes (1998).

=== Phonology ===
Vowels
| | Front | Central | Back |
|---|---|---|---|
| Close | *i | *ɨ | *u |
| Open | | *a | |

Consonants
| | | Bilabial | Alveolar | Palatal | Velar | Glottal |
|---|---|---|---|---|---|---|
| Stop | voiceless | *p | *t | | *k | *ʔ |
| Stop | voiced | *b | *d | | *g | |
| Fricative | | | *s | | | |
| Nasal | | *m | *n | | *ŋ | |
| Lateral | | | *l | | | |
| Approximant | | *w | | *y | | |

=== Vocabulary ===
The comparison table (taken from Himes (1998) and Zorc (1979)) illustrates the correspondences between the Southern Cordilleran languages, including inherited vocabulary as well as Southern Cordilleran innovations.

Comparison table
Words inherited from Proto-Austronesian (PAn)
| Ilongot | Pangasinan | Ibaloi | PSC | PAn | Meaning |
|---|---|---|---|---|---|
| ma:go | a:gɨw | ʔágɨw | *ʔa:gɨw | *qaləjaw | 'day' |
| dɨ:nom | danúm | čánom | *dánum | *daNum | 'water' |
Southern Cordilleran innovations
| Ilongot | Pangasinan | Ibaloi | PSC | PAn | Meaning |
| ʔa:gɨt | agát | ʔagát | *ʔágat | (*laqia) | 'ginger' |
| bɨsik | batík | bɨtík | *bɨtík | (*laRiw) | 'run' |
| tɨɣí | salí | sɨdí | *sɨlí | (*qaqay) | 'foot' |
| -to | -tu | -to | *-tu | (*nia) | 'his/her' |
| kɨyó | kiyɨ́w | kiyɨ́w | *kɨyɨ́w (Note: *kɨyɨ́w is an irregular reflex of PAn *kaSiw) | (*kaSiw) | 'tree' |
| tóʔo | tuʔú | túʔu | *túʔu (Note: *túʔu is an irregular reflex of PAn *Cau) | (*Cau) | 'person' |
