= Central Cordilleran languages =

Subgroup of the Austronesian language family

Central Cordilleran
- Geographic distribution: northern Luzon
- Linguistic classification: Austronesian: Malayo-Polynesian; Philippine; Northern Luzon; Meso-Cordilleran; Central Cordilleran

Language codes
- Glottolog: cent2296

The Central Cordilleran languages are a group of closely related languages within the Northern Luzon subgroup of the Austronesian language family. They are spoken in the interior highlands of Northern Luzon in the Cordillera Central mountain range.

== Classification ==
Reid (1974) classifies the Central Cordilleran languages as follows:

- Central Cordilleran
  - Isinai
  - North Central Cordilleran
    - Kalinga–Itneg
      - Itneg (a dialect cluster)
      - Kalinga (a dialect cluster)
    - Nuclear Cordilleran
      - Ifugao
      - Balangao
      - Bontok–Kankanay
        - Bontok–Finallig
        - Kankanaey

Reid (1991) has suggested that the Central Cordilleran languages are most closely related to the Southern Cordilleran languages, which is supported by numerous exclusively shared innovations listed by Himes (2005).

== Reconstruction ==
Proto-Central Cordilleran
- Reconstruction of: Central Cordilleran languages
- Reconstructed ancestors: Proto-Austronesian: Proto-Malayo-Polynesian; Proto-Philippine; Proto-Northern Luzon

Proto-Central Cordilleran has been reconstructed by Reid (1974; 2006).

=== Phonology ===
Vowels
	Front	Central	Back
Close	*i	*ɨ	*u
Open		*a	

Consonants
		Bilabial	Alveolar	Palatal	Velar	Glottal
Stop	voiceless	*p	*t		*k	*ʔ
Stop	voiced	*b	*d		*g	
Fricative			*s			
Nasal		*m	*n		*ŋ	
Lateral			*l			
Approximant		*w		*y		

Proto-Central Cordilleran can be reconstructed with phonemic stress.

=== Vocabulary ===
The comparison table (taken from Reid (1974) illustrates the correspondences between the Central Cordilleran languages, including inherited vocabulary as well as Central Cordilleran innovations.

Comparison table
Words inherited from Proto-Austronesian (PAn)
Isinai	Kalinga	Ifugao	PCC	PAn	Meaning
béoy	boloy	baluy	*balɨy	*balay	'house'
páχoy	págoy	páguy	*págɨy	*pajay	'rice'
Central Cordilleran innovations
Isinai	Kalinga	Ifugao	PCC	PAn	Meaning
ʔíla	ʔíla	ʔíla	*ʔíla	(*kita)	'see'
dalit	dalit	dalet	*dalit	(*tuNa)	'eel'
kolaŋ	ʔolaŋ	ʔolaŋ	*kɨlaŋ	(*quləj)	'worm'
waŋwaŋ	waŋwaŋ	waŋwaŋ	*waŋwaŋ	(*iluR)	'river'
