= Karao language =

Austronesian language spoken in the Philippines

Karao
- Karaw
- Native to: Philippines
- Region: Luzon
- Native speakers: 2,000 (2011)
- Language family: Austronesian: Malayo-Polynesian; Philippine; Northern Luzon; Meso-Cordilleran; Southern Cordilleran; West Southern Cordilleran; Nuclear Southern Cordilleran; Karao

Language codes
- ISO 639-3: kyj
- Glottolog: kara1487
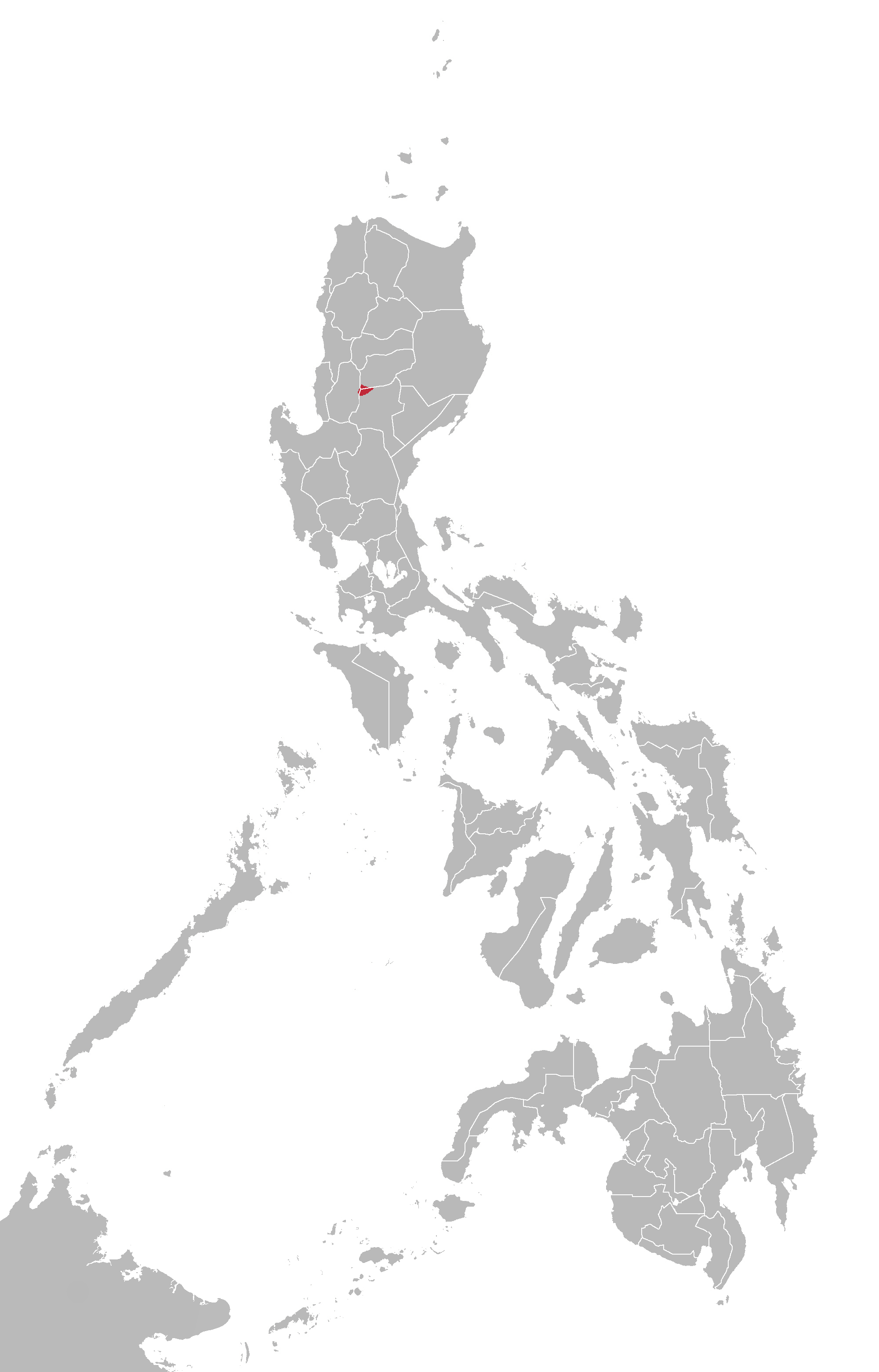
- Area where Karao is spoken according to Ethnologue

Karao (also spelled Karaw) is a language of northern Luzon, Philippines. It is spoken in the Karao, Ekip, and Bokod areas of western Benguet Province, and in the southwestern corner of Ifugao Province. The language is named after the barangay of Karaw in Bokod municipality, Benguet. The Karao ethnic group in Benguet still exists to this day, but the Karao traditions are gradually fading away into their memories.

== Phonology ==
=== Consonants ===
Consonants
		Bilabial	Inter-dental	Alveolar	Alveo-palatal	Velar	Back velar	Glottal
Plosive	Voiceless	p		t		k	k̠	ʔ
Plosive	Voiced	b		d		g		
Plosive	Labialized					gʷ		
Affricate	Voiceless				t͡ʃ			
Affricate	Voiced				d͡ʒ			
Fricative		ɸ	θ	s			x̠	
Nasal		m		n		ŋ		
Lateral				l				
Tap				ɾ				
Approximant					j	w		

- /p, b, t, d, g, k̠/ have three allophones each: an unaspirated, an unreleased, and a slightly aspirated allophone. For example, /p/ has [p˭] in a syllable onset, [p̚] in a syllable coda and word-finally after /ɨ/, and [pʰ] word-finally in free variation with [p˭].
- The stop /k/ only has an unaspirated and an unreleased allophone. [k˭] is only in a syllable onset, and [k̚] is only in a syllable coda when it geminates following /ɨ/.

=== Vowels ===
Vowels
	Front	Central	Back
Non-open	i	ɨ	o
Open		a	

- /i/ has three allophones: [i], [e], and [ɛ]. [e] is found in open syllables next to /k̠/ and /x̠/, e.g., /six̠o/ [sex̠o] 'elbow'. [ɛ] is found in closed syllables next to /k̠/ and /x̠/, e.g., /sax̠it/ [sax̠ɛt] 'sickness'.
- /ɨ/ has two allophones: [ɨ] and [ʌ], which are in free variation. [ʌ] is more common in fast speech, while [ɨ] is more common in slow speech.
- /o/ has two allophones: [u] and [o]. [u] generally occurs in word-initial syllables, while [o] occurs in word-final syllables, e.g., /bolow/ [bulow] 'to bark'. The vowel is normally [u] after /k/ and /g/, but is in free variation with [o] in word-final closed syllables, e.g., /t͡ʃakos/ [t͡ʃakus ~ t͡ʃakos] 'immediately'. It is normally [o] after [k̠] or [x̠], but is in free variation with [u] in closed word-final syllables, e.g., /ʔox̠ow/ [ʔox̠ow ~ ʔux̠uw] 'to cease to rain'.
- /a/ has two allophones: [a] and [ʌ]. [ʌ] is found in two limited sets of words, e.g., /ʔapʔap/ [ʔʌpʔʌpʰ] 'to distribute' and /nijana/ [nijanʌ] 'why'.
