= Bugkalot language =

Austronesian language spoken in the Phnes

Bugkalot
- Region: Eastern Nueva Vizcaya, Western Quirino, east Nueva Ecija, northwest Aurora, Philippines
- Ethnicity: Bugkalot
- Native speakers: 6,000 (2010 census)
- Language family: Austronesian: Malayo-Polynesian; Philippine; Northern Luzon; Meso-Cordilleran; Southern Cordilleran; Bugkalot

Language codes
- ISO 639-3: ilk
- Glottolog: ilon1239
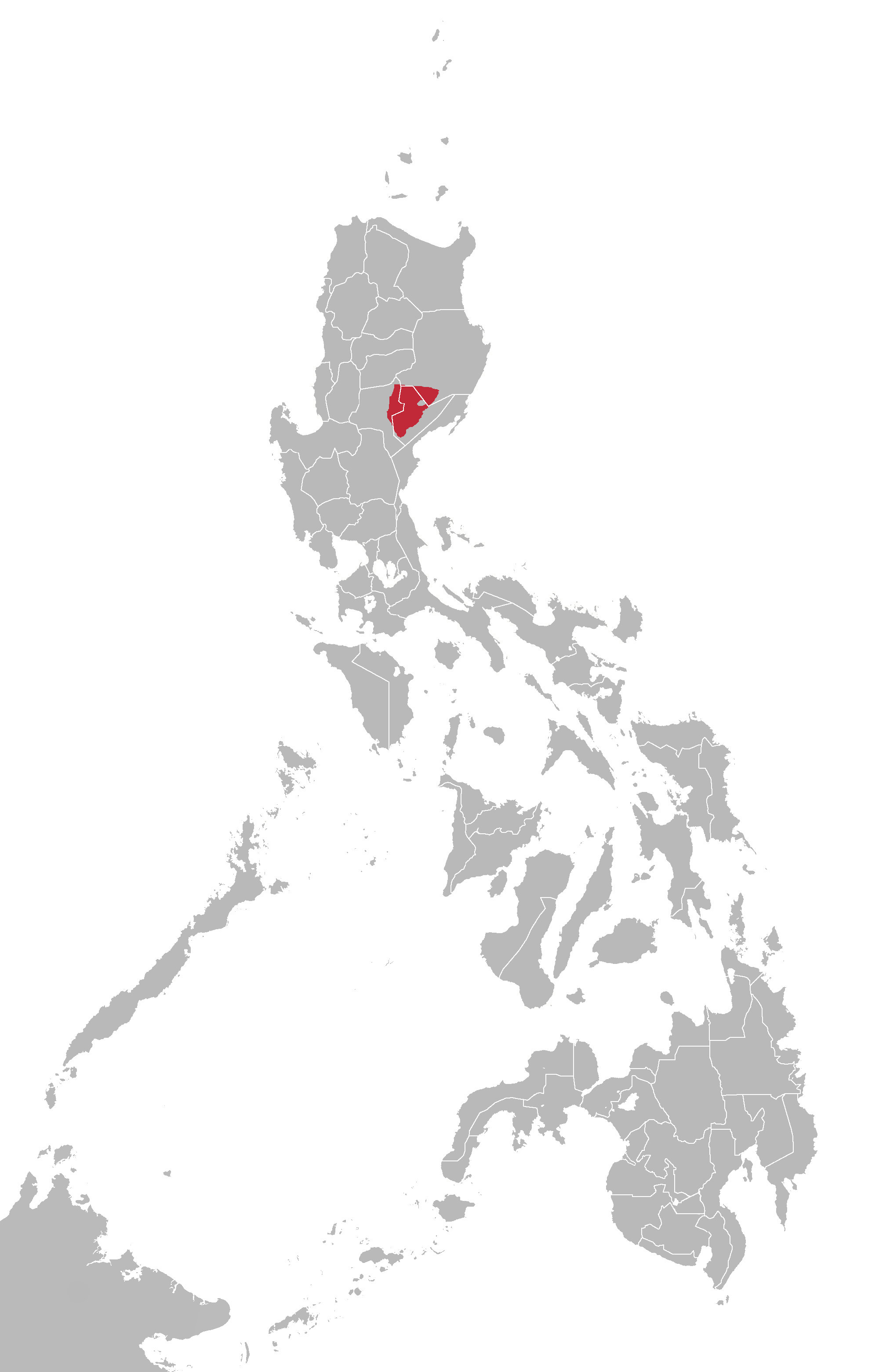
- Area where Bugkalot is spoken

Bugkalot (also Ilongot) is a language of the indigenous Bugkalot people of northern Luzon, Philippines.

== Distribution ==
Ethnologue lists the following provinces in which Ilongot is spoken.

- Most of Quirino Province north of the Cagayan River
- Eastern Nueva Vizcaya Province
- Southern Isabela Province (upper reaches of the Cagayan River)
- Northwest Aurora

== Dialects ==
Ethnologue lists the following dialects.

- Abaka (Abaca)
- Egongot
- Ibalao (Ibilao)
- Italon
- Iyongut

Alternate names include Bugkalut, Bukalot, and Lingotes.
