= Itneg languages =

Austronesian language spoken in the Philippines

Itneg
- Native to: Philippines
- Region: Luzon
- Ethnicity: Igorot (Itneg)
- Native speakers: 17,000 (2003)
- Language family: Austronesian: Malayo-Polynesian; Philippine; Northern Luzon; Meso-Cordilleran; Central Cordilleran; Kalinga–Itneg; Itneg

Official status
- Recognised minority language in: Regional language in the Philippines

Language codes
- ISO 639-3: Variously: itb – Binongan Itneg iti – Inlaod Itneg itt – Maeng Itneg tis – Masadiit Itneg ity – Moyadan Itneg
- Glottolog: itne1252
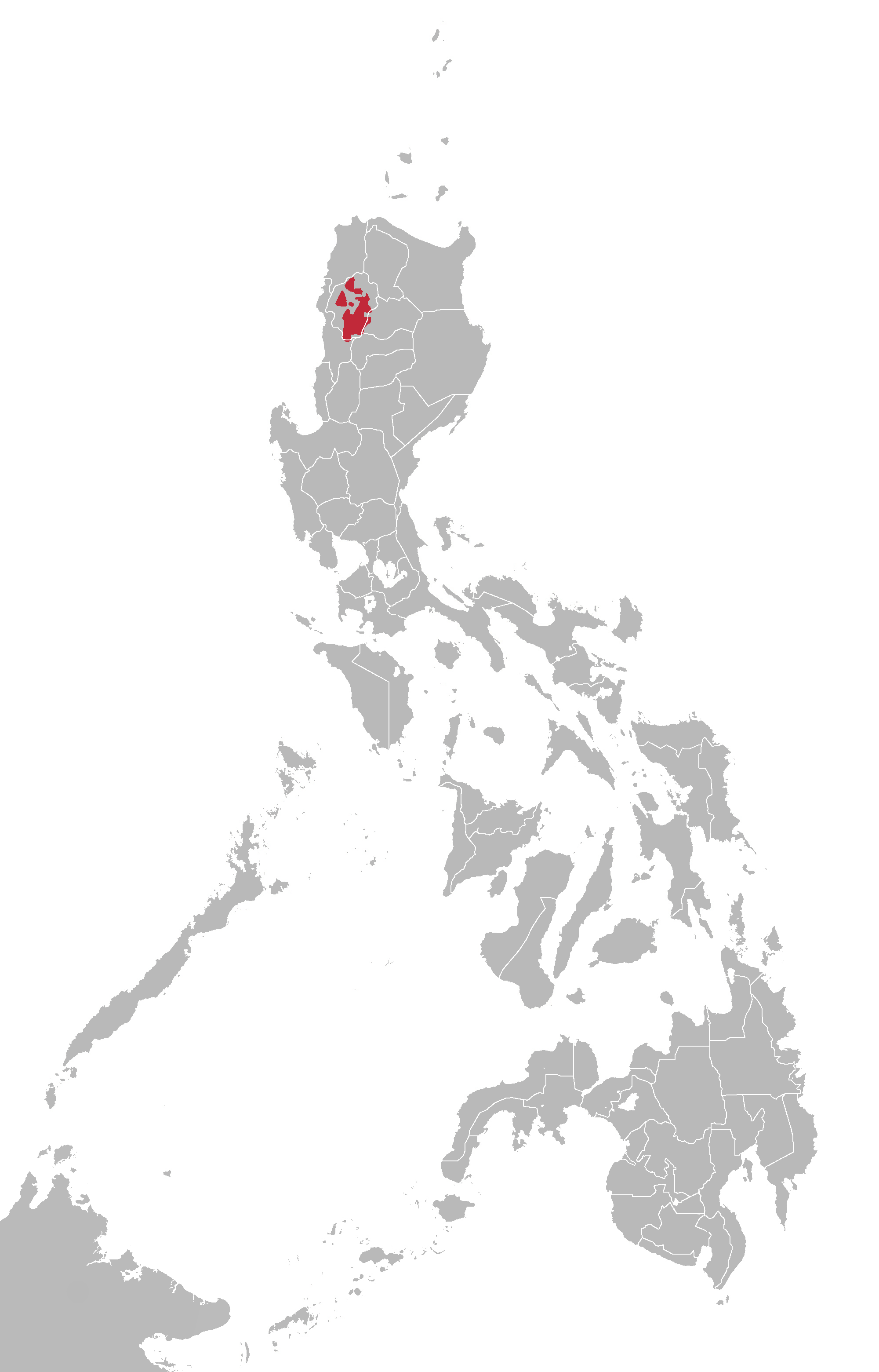
- Areas where the various Itneg dialects (including Kalinga Itneg) are spoken according to Ethnologue

Itneg is a South-Central Cordilleran dialect continuum found in the island of Luzon, Philippines. This language and Ilocano are spoken by the Itneg people (sometimes also referred to as the "Tingguian people") in Abra.

Several ethnic-Itneg dialects are taxonomically part of the neighboring Kalinga language.

== Locations and dialects ==
Ethnologue reports the following locations for each of the five Itneg languages.

- Binongan Itneg: Licuan-Baay, Abra. 7,500 speakers.
- Inlaod Itneg: a few villages in Peñarrubia, Lagangilang, Danglas, and Langiden municipalities, Abra. 9,000 speakers.
- Maeng Itneg: Luba, Tubo, and Villaviciosa municipalities, Abra. 18,000 speakers.
- Masadiit Itneg: Sallapadan, Bucloc, and Boliney municipalities, Abra; also in the western border strip of Kalinga Province. 7,500 speakers. Dialects are Masadiit Boliney and Masadiit Sallapadan.
- Moyadan Itneg: Abra. 12,000 speakers.

However, Ronald Himes (1997) recognizes two dialects for Itneg, namely Binongan (eastern) and Inlaod (western).

== Phonology ==
Itneg languages almost sound the same with Ilocano, Pangasinan, and other Igorot languages.

=== Vowels ===
Itneg speakers use 5 vowel sounds: /a/, /i/, /u/, /ɛ ~ e/, /o/.

=== Consonants ===
Itneg features doubled consonants, so the language may sound guttural to Tagalog, Ilokano, and even Pangasinan speakers. The uniqueness of this circumstance is often expressed by saying Itneg speakers have "a hard tongue".

Itneg is also one of the Philippine languages which is excluded from [ɾ]-[d] allophony.
