= Kalinga language =

Northern Luzon language spoken in the Philippines

Kalinga
- Native to: Philippines
- Region: most parts of Kalinga, northern parts of Mountain Province, eastern parts of Abra and southern parts of Apayao, Luzon
- Native speakers: (110,000 cited 1998–2008); No estimate for Mabaka Valley
- Language family: Austronesian: Malayo-Polynesian; Philippine; Northern Luzon; Meso-Cordilleran; Central Cordilleran; Kalinga–Itneg; Kalinga

Language codes
- ISO 639-3: Variously: bjx – Banao Itneg tis – Masadiit Itneg ity – Moyadan Itneg kyb – Butbut Kalinga kmk – Limos Kalinga kml – Tanudan Kalinga knb – Lubuagan Kalinga kkg – Mabaka Valley Kalinga kmd – Madukayang Kalinga ksc – Southern Kalinga (Bangad)
- Glottolog: kali1311
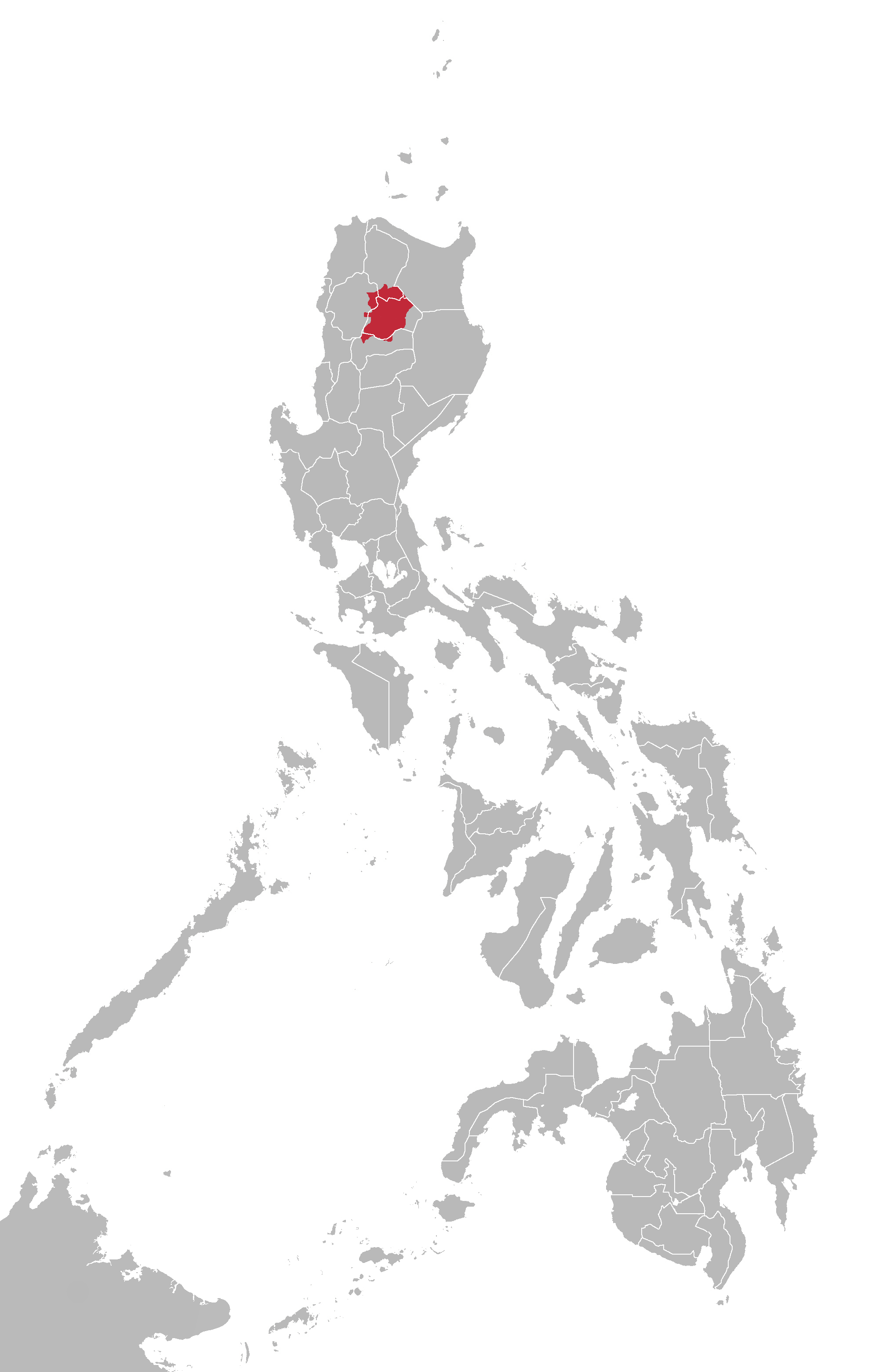
- Area where the Kalinga dialect continuum is spoken according to Ethnologue

Kalinga (IPA: [ka'liŋɡa]) is a dialect continuum of Kalinga Province in the Philippines, spoken by the Kalinga people, alongside Ilocano. The Banao Itneg variety is not one of the neighboring Itneg languages.

== Dialects ==
Ronald Himes (1997) divides Kalinga into three dialects: Masadiit (in Abra), Northern Kalinga, and South-Central Kalinga.

Ethnologue reports the following locations for each of the eight Kalinga languages it identifies. Banao Itneg is classified by Ethnologue as Kalinga rather than Itneg.

- Butbut Kalinga: spoken in Kalinga Province: Tinglayan and Butbut; Buscalan, Bugnay, Loccong, and Ngibat; Tabuk, Lucnang, Pakak, Kataw, and Dinongsay. Also in Rizal: Annunang, Malapiat, Andarayan, and Bua. 15,000 speakers. Language status is 5 (developing), 1,000 monoglots.
- Limos Kalinga (Limos-Liwan Kalinga, Northern Kalinga): spoken in Kalinga Province (Tabuk, north to border) and Conner municipality, Apayao Province. 12,700 speakers. Language status is 5 (developing).
- Lubuagan Kalinga: spoken in Kalinga Province (Lubuagan and Tabuk). 30,000 speakers. Dialects are Guinaang, Balbalasang, Ableg-Salegseg, and Balatok-Kalinga (Balatok-Itneg). Pasil Kalinga., Language status is 5 (developing).
- Mabaka Valley Kalinga (Kal-Uwan, Mabaka, Mabaka Itneg): spoken in Conner municipality, Apayao Province, as well as western Abra and northern Kalinga Province.
- Majukayang Kalinga (Madukayang): spoken in Tabuk, Kalinga Province and in Paracelis municipality, Mountain Province. 1,500 speakers as of 1990., Language status is 6a. (Vigorous).
- Southern Kalinga: spoken in Kalinga Province (Lubuagan municipality; some also in Tabuk) and Mountain Province (13 villages of Sadanga and Sagada municipalities). 11,000 speakers as of 1980. Dialects are Mallango, Sumadel, Bangad, and Tinglayan.
- Tanudan Kalinga (Lower Tanudan, Lower Tanudan Kalinga, Mangali Kalinga): spoken at the southern end of the Tanudan valley in southern Kalinga Province. 11,200 speakers as of 1998. Dialects are Minangali (Mangali), Tinaloctoc (Taluctoc), Pinangol (Pangul), Dacalan, and Lubo. Language status is 5 (developing). 1,120 monoglots.
- Banao Itneg (Banao, Banaw, Itneg, Timggian, Tinguian, Vanaw, Vyanaw, Bhanaw Tinggian): spoken in Kalinga Province (Balbalan and Pasil municipalities) and Abra (Daguioman and Malibcong municipalities). 3,500 speakers as of 2003. Dialects are Malibcong Banao, Banao Pikekj, Gubang Itneg and Daguioman.

== Phonology ==
=== Consonants ===
		Labial	Alveolar	Palatal	Velar	Glottal
Plosive	voiceless	p	t		k	ʔ
Plosive	voiced	b	d		ɡ	
Nasal		m	n		ŋ	
Fricative			s			
Lateral			l			
Approximant		w		j		

=== Vowels ===
	Front	Central	Back
Close	i		u
Mid			o
Open		a	

/a/ can also have an allophone of [ə].

== Writing system ==
=== Lubuagan Kalinga ===
Lubuagan Kalinga alphabet
a	b	by	k	ch	e	g	h	i	l	m	n	ng	o	p	r	s	t	u	w	y	ɏ	-

A hyphen is used for a glottal stop after a consonant, as in man-achug 'to guard'; an acute accent for a 'double' glottal stop between vowels, as in guàɏon 'to chew'; elsewhere it is not marked. An acute accent may be used on a stressed vowel to distinguish words, such as chílu 'honey' vs chilú 'dew', but otherwise stress is not usually marked. R occurs in foreign loans; it is usually replaced by L or Ɏ. Ɏ is evidently something like Y ([j]), but with the tongue further forward, and may be pronounced with the tip of the tongue behind the lower teeth or lip.
