= Meso-Cordilleran languages =

Subgroup of the Austronesian language family

Meso-Cordilleran
- Geographic distribution: north Luzon
- Linguistic classification: Austronesian: Malayo-Polynesian; Philippine; Northern Luzon; Meso-Cordilleran
- Subdivisions: Central Cordilleran; Southern Cordilleran; Alta

Language codes
- ISO 639-3: –
- Glottolog: meso1254

The Meso-Cordilleran languages are a group of languages spoken in or near the Cordillera Central mountain range in Northern Luzon. Its speakers are culturally very diverse, and include the lowland Pangasinense, the Igorot highlanders (including Bugkalot), and Alta-speaking Aeta groups.

== Languages ==
Classification per Himes (2005):

- Meso-Cordilleran
  - Northern Alta
  - Southern Alta
  - South-Central Cordilleran
    - Central Cordilleran
      - Isinai
      - North Central Cordilleran
        - Kalinga–Itneg
          - Itneg (a dialect cluster)
          - Kalinga (a dialect cluster)
        - Nuclear Cordilleran
          - Ifugao
          - Balangao
          - Bontok–Kankanay
            - Bontok–Finallig
            - Kankanaey
    - Southern Cordilleran
      - Ilongot
      - West Southern Cordilleran
        - Pangasinan
        - Nuclear Southern Cordilleran
          - Ibaloi
          - Karao
          - Iwaak
          - Kallahan
