= Ifugao language =

Austronesian language spoken in the Philippines

Ifugao
- Native to: Philippines
- Region: Ifugao, Luzon
- Native speakers: (130,000 cited 1987–2007)
- Language family: Austronesian: Malayo-Polynesian; Philippine; Northern Luzon; Meso-Cordilleran; Central Cordilleran; Nuclear Cordilleran; Ifugao

Language codes
- ISO 639-3: Variously: ifb – Batad Ifugao ifa – Amganad Ifugao ifu – Mayoyao Ifugao ifk – Tuwali language
- Glottolog: ifug1247
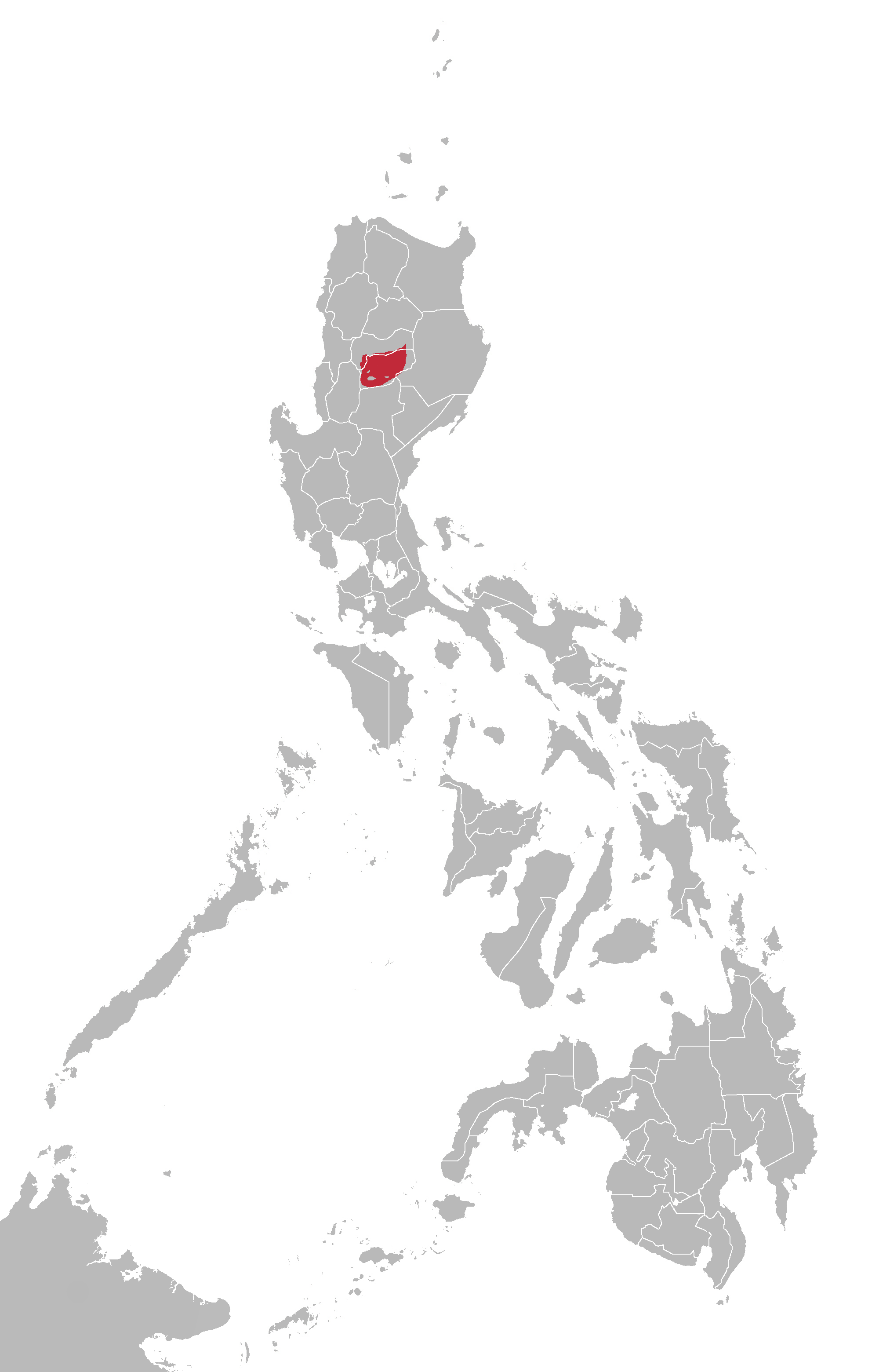
- Area where the Ifugao dialect continuum is spoken according to Ethnologue

Ifugao is a Malayo-Polynesian language spoken in the northern valleys of Ifugao, Philippines. It is a member of the Northern Luzon subfamily and is closely related to the Bontoc, Balangaw, and Kankanaey languages. It is a dialect continuum, and its four main varieties—such as Tuwali—are sometimes considered separate languages.

Loanwords from other languages, such as Ilokano, are replacing some older terminology.

== Dialects ==
Ethnologue reports the following locations for each of the four Ifugao languages.

- Amganad Ifugao: spoken in Hungduan and Banaue municipalities of Ifugao Province, and into southwestern Mountain Province. 27,100 speakers as of 2000. Dialects are Burnay Ifugao and Banaue Ifugao.
- Batad Ifugao (Ayangan Ifugao): spoken in central Ifugao Province. There are also some speakers in Isabela Province, on the eastern shore of the Magat reservoir. 10,100 speakers as of 2002. Dialects include Ducligan Ifugao.
- Mayoyao Ifugao (Mayaoyaw): spoken in Ifugao Province, (northern Mayoyao, Aguinaldo, and Alfonso Lista municipalities) and Mountain Province (2 small border areas). 30,000 speakers as of 2007.
- Tuwali Ifugao (Gilipanes, Ifugaw, Kiangan Ifugao, Quiangan, Tuwali): spoken in southern Ifugao Province. 30,000 speakers as of 2000. Dialects are Hapao Ifugao, Hungduan Ifugao, and Lagawe Ifugao.

== Phonology ==
=== Consonants ===
		Labial	Alveolar	Palatal	Velar	Glottal
Plosive	voiceless	p	t		k	ʔ
Plosive	voiced	b	d		ɡ	
Nasal		m	n		ŋ	
Fricative						h
Lateral			l			
Approximant		w		j		

- Other sounds such as /s/ and /r/ occur in loanwords.

=== Vowels ===
	Front	Central	Back
Close	i		ʊ ~ u
Mid	ɛ	ə	ɔ
Open		a	

- /ʊ/ can also be heard as close-back [u].
- /ə/ does not exist in the Tuwali dialect.
- /i/ can also be heard as [ɪ].

== Orthography ==
The unified Ifugao alphabet is as follows: A, B, D, E, G, H, I, K, L, M, N, Ng, O, P, T, U, W, Y. The letters are pronounced differently depending on the dialect of the speaker.
