= Ibaloi language =

Austronesian language spoken in the Philippines

Ibaloi
- Ibaloy
- Ivadoy
- Region: Luzon, Philippines
- Ethnicity: Ibaloi people
- Native speakers: 120,000 (2005)
- Language family: Austronesian: Malayo-Polynesian; Philippine; Northern Luzon; Meso-Cordilleran; Southern Cordilleran; West Southern Cordilleran; Nuclear Southern Cordilleran; Ibaloi

Language codes
- ISO 639-3: ibl
- Glottolog: ibal1244
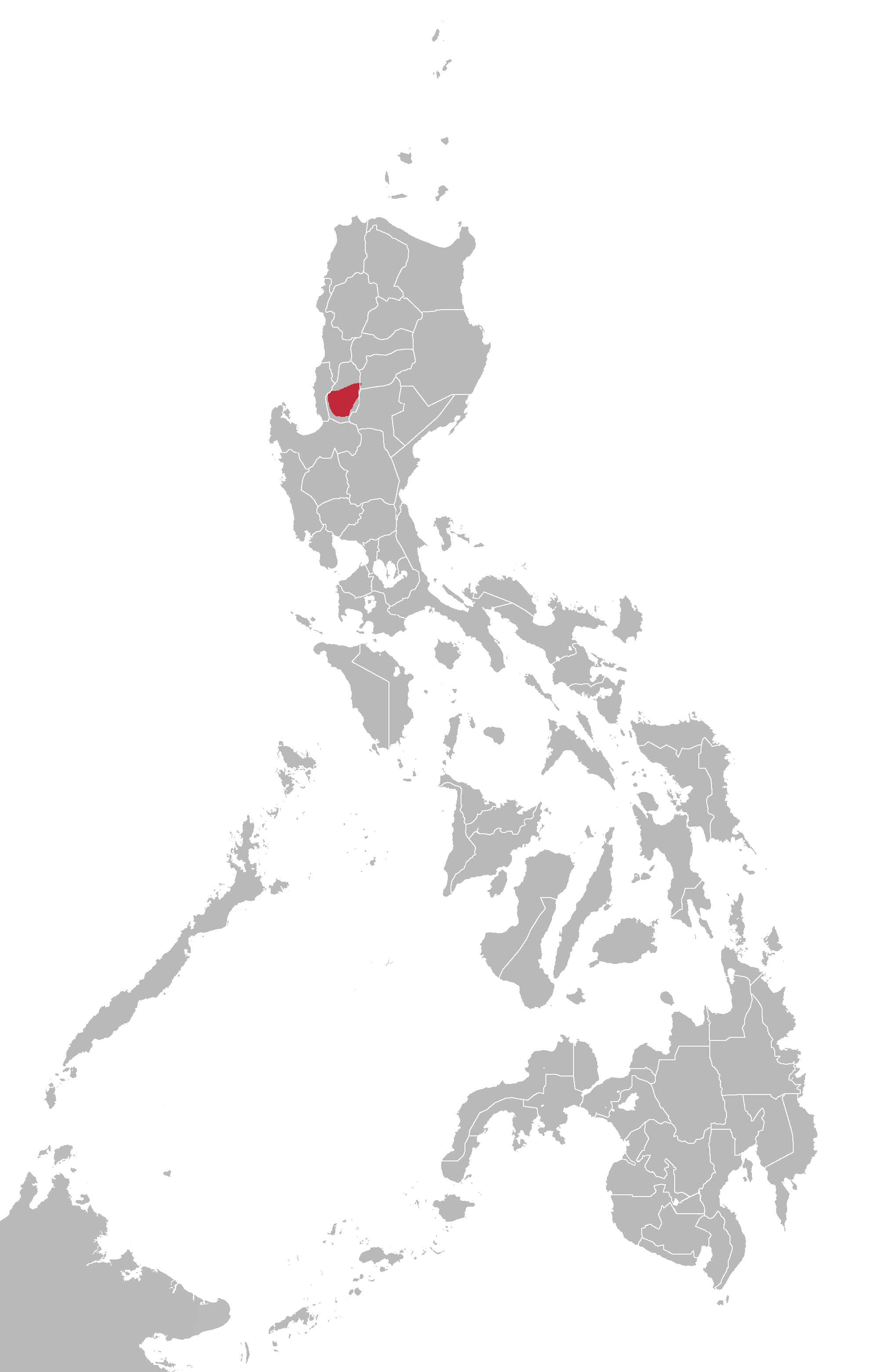
- Area where Ibaloi is spoken according to Ethnologue

The Ibaloi language (ësël ivadoy, /əsəl ivaˈdoj/) (Filipino: Wikang Ibaloy) belongs to the Malayo-Polynesian branch of the Austronesian languages family. It is closely related to the Pangasinan language, and is spoken primarily in central and southern Benguet, and western Nueva Vizcaya and eastern La Union. Its dialects include Daklan, Kabayan, and Bokod.

Ibaloi phonemes are similar to those found in other Philippine languages with a few exceptions. Many variants of the Ibaloi tongue have naturally occurring /f/, /dʒ/ and /v/, as in sifa (interrogative 'who'), ibjag ('to lose one's grip on something or someone, to let go') and devit (a traditional wrap-around skirt). /ʃ/ is also commonly heard in the La Trinidad valley and nearby areas, as in xima (a particle usually equivalent to the prepositions in, on, or to depending on the sentence construction), but may be occasionally heard as /tʃ/ in some communities.

== Phonology ==
Vowel phonemes
	Front	Back
High	i	
Mid	e	o
Close	a	

Consonants
		Labial	Alveolar	Palatal	Velar	Glottal
Nasal		m	n	ɲ	ŋ	
Plosive/ Affricate	voiceless	p	t	tʃ	k	ʔ
Plosive/ Affricate	voiced	b	d	dʒ	ɡ	ʔ
Fricative		f v	s			h
Approximant			l	j	w	
Tap			ɾ			

Ibaloi is one of the Philippine languages that do not exhibit [ɾ]-[d] allophony.

== Verbal Affixes ==
There are different verbal affixes in Ibaloi. Among them are -en, i-, -an, i-...-an, man-, on-, meki-, and pe-.

Verbal Affixes in Ibaloi:

- -en: patient oriented action
- i-: positioning one thing to another
- -an: location of another action
- i-...-an: recipient
- man-: reciprocal, reflexive, performance
- on-: point in time action
- meki-: join others in an action
- pe-: causative

== Sample text ==
Ibaloi	English
Ser, egshien ko.	Sir, I will carry. O.K.
Bay-im, warey mengegshi.	Nevermind, someone is doing it already.
Bay-im itan, egshi-en ko.	Leave that one; I will carry it.
Piga i bayshan kon emin.	How much will you charge for all this?
Ansan. Iaknan taka bengat ni epat ja pisos.	That's too much. I will give four pesos only.
Ondaw ka shi Ilokos?	Are you going to Ilokos?
Owen, ngaran toy pandokanan no ondawak shiman?	Yes, what do I take to get there?
Pandogan kedman ja bas.	You take that bus.
Pakidawka.	Follow me.
Toy paradaan ni jeep para Santa Maria?	Where do I get the jeep to Santa Maria?
Shiman, nem mas mapmapteng i traysikel.	Over there, but it's better to take a tricycle.
Kasanoy kabijag ni biyake manpa Baguio?	How long is the trip to Baguio?

== Examples ==
=== Narrative sample ===
The following is an excerpt from the story Nangoyan (1979), illustrating the narrative style and traditional orthography of the Ibaloi language.

Ibaloi	English
Wara'y istoriya ni nankeba-kol tan nankedakay nonta bayag da pangkep nima nay-amo-an ni shamon ali'd Bokod shi Ambokdew. Say kabol'la inngadnan sha so kono ni Nangoyan nonta bayag da, nanminamang i baley shima bedalan tan ditopan, ja nay-amo-an ni shanom shima Bokod, jet shima apit ni bedalan ja nay-amo-an ni shanom, wara'y daki'n nanbaley shiman, jet no mekidot kono'y shanom, sota daki, onshalong ja an mannikay, ono sota kowan sha-ey mengapdos. Sota bii'n nanbaley shi apit ni ditopan ondaw kono ngo jet an mannikay ja ikapo to nodta pintek ni inkapo-an so nonta daki, jet emaypeptek ni olay. No mendong sota daki, mendong kono ngo sota bli. No memsaw sota daki, memsaw kono ngo sota bii. Jet satan kono ni olay ja ireka manminamang.	There is a story the old women and old men told long ago about the place where the two rivere come together at Bokod and Ambuclao. The reason why they named this place Nangoyan (swimming place) long ago is the subject of the story. It seems there were two houses opposite one another on the east and on the west of the place where the rivers come together. On the east side, a boy lived there, and when the river became turbid, he would go down to fish--fish with a net. The girl who lived on the west side would also go to fish, beginning opposite where the boy began, and she would stay opposite him continually. If the boy would move upstream, the girl would also go upstream. If the boy would move downstream, the girl would also move downstream. And that's the way it was continually, their staying opposite one another.
