= Kankanaey language =

Austronesian language spoken in the Philippines

Kankanaey
- Kankana-ey, Kankanaëy
- Native to: Philippines
- Region: Northern Luzon
- Ethnicity: Kankanaey people
- Native speakers: (240,000 cited 1990 census – 2003)
- Language family: Austronesian: Malayo-Polynesian; Philippine; Northern Luzon; Meso-Cordilleran; Central Cordilleran; Nuclear Cordilleran; Bontok–Kankanay; Kankanaey

Language codes
- ISO 639-3: Either: kne – Kankanaey xnn – Northern Kankanaey
- Glottolog: kank1245
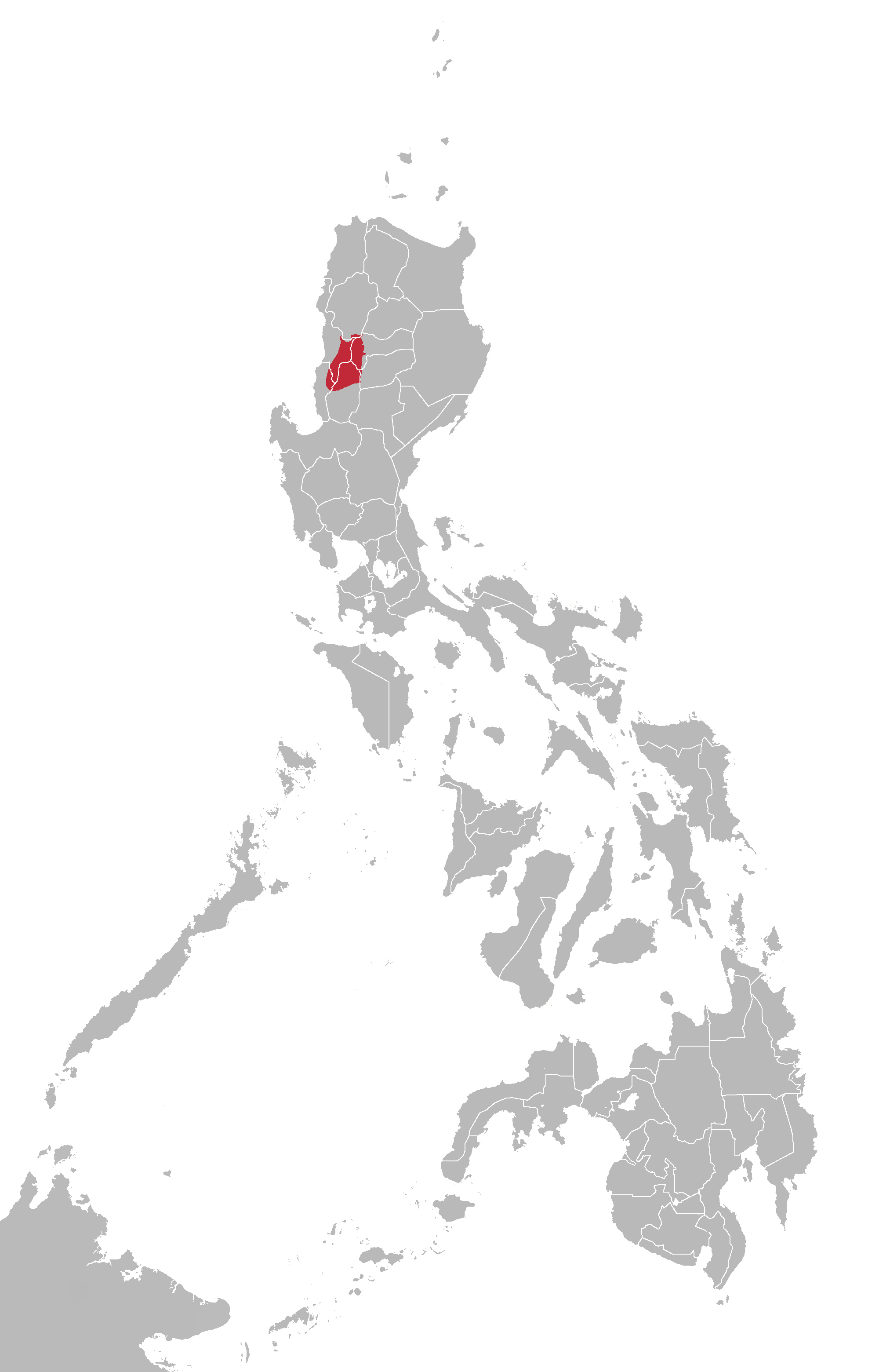
- Area where Kankanaey (including Northern Kankanaey, but not Maeng Itneg) is spoken according to Ethnologue

Kankanaey, also spelled Kankana-ey or Kankanaëy, (kan-ka-NA-əy; kali di Kankanaëy [kaˌli di kankaˈnaɁəj]) is a South-Central Cordilleran language under the Austronesian family spoken on the island of Luzon in the Philippines primarily by the Kankanaey people. Alternate names for the language include Central Kankanaey, Kankanai, and Kankanay. It is widely used by Cordillerans, alongside Ilocano, specifically people from Mountain Province and people from the northern part of the Benguet Province. Kankanaey has a slight mutual intelligibility with the Ilocano language.

== Dialects ==
Ethnologue lists Mankayan-Buguias, Kapangan, Bakun-Kibungan, and Guinzadan as dialects of Kankanaey. Northern Kankanaey is listed as a separate language.

Kankanaey is spoken in northern Benguet, southwestern Mountain Province, southeastern Ilocos Sur, northeastern La Union, southwestern Ifugao, and northwest Nueva Vizcaya. Northern Kankanaey is spoken in western Mountain Province, southeastern Ilocos Sur, and southern Abra.

== Phonology ==
=== Consonants ===
		Labial	Alveolar	Palatal	Velar	Glottal
Plosive	voiceless	p	t		k	ʔ
Plosive	voiced	b	d		ɡ	
Nasal		m	n		ŋ	
Fricative			s			
Lateral			l			
Approximant		w		j		

- Stops can be heard as unreleased, when in syllable-final position.

=== Vowels ===
	Front	Central	Back
Close	i	ɨ ~ ə	o ~ u
Mid		ɨ ~ ə	o ~ u
Open		a	

- Allophones of /i, a/ are heard as [ɪ, ʌ].
- Allophones of /o/ can be heard as [ʊ], [u].

Some words with this sound are as follows:

- emmey – 'to go'
- entako – 'let's go' (a contracted form of emmey tako)
- ed – a preposition showing location or time marker (e.g. ed Baguio 'in Baguio', ed nabbaon 'in the long-ago times')
- ippe-ey – 'to put'
- eng-gay – 'only, finish'

== Grammar ==
=== Kankanaey content roots ===
Kankanaey content roots divide the Kankanaey lexicon into different categories to define their usage and word type. The categories are class roots, property roots, stative roots, perception-stative roots, physical roots, and action roots. Word charts and definitions taken from Janet Allen's Kankanaey: A Role and Reference Grammar Analysis.

==== Class roots ====
Class roots are a class of nouns that are defined by physical or other sensory characteristics.

Example of class roots:
Word	Definition
babai	female, especially human
beey	house, home of person or anima; container where something is usually kept
begas	hulled rice

==== Property roots ====
Property roots point out a characteristic like size, taste, color, etc.

Example of property roots:
Word	Definition
na lokneng	soft (easily cut)
na emas	sweet, tasty
ando	tall, long

==== Stative roots ====
Stative roots point out a temporary physical condition. Result-stative roots are states that are changed by an outside source.

Example of stative roots:
Word	Definition
natey	dead, deceased
gadgad	mangy
kemi	dented in, partially crushed
nabeteng	drunk

==== Perception-stative roots ====
Perception-stative roots point out a perception by a living being, such as physical, emotional and mental perception-states. Living beings are able to actively perceive with control and content, so these roots form predicates of a wider range than those formed from simple stative roots.

Example of perception-stative roots:
Word	Definition
nailak	see, look at
bongot	angry
kibtot	startled
kiyapot	rushed, stressed

==== Physical roots ====
Physical roots point out movements and position such as natural movements, body movements, and positions, but not bodily functions. They may denote location, direction, or manner of movement.

Example of physical roots:
Word	Definition
tedted	drip
ali	move toward speaker, come
saa	go home
balalong	move downwards, descend
sekad	stamp, stomp
tagtag	run

==== Action roots ====
Action roots point out an activity by a living and sometimes intentional participant. Some action roots indicate the direction of that action with respect to another participant; others denote a participant as involved with the action but not the end receiver. Rather than having the action root modified, Kankanaey roots are very specific as to what the action is. Many roots indicate the receiver of the action.

Example of action roots:
Word	Definition
togda	eat lunch
tilid	carry something on one shoulder
tob-ong	put a relatively small amount of something into a relatively large amount of water
todyok	jab or poke upwards at something
mangan	to eat

=== Reduplication ===
Multiple types of reduplication are used when forming words in Kankanaey. Unaffixed or affixed roots may experience reduplication, and have their first CV, CVC, or CV(C)CV of the base form copied, with each type of base executing different functions. Kankanaey has many roots that have canonical shapes that appear to possess reduplication. These irreducible roots can contain one syllable that is repeated such as taktak and baba, but other roots can contain a repeated syllable with a prefix or infix such as togingging and wagawag. All of these irreducible roots are not examples of reduplication as a word-building process.

=== Prefixes ===
Many Kankanaey affixes are normal prefixes that come directly before the root such as the ka- in katokdo, "seat-mate," from tokdo. A lot of reduplicative affixation is used before the prefixation such as the CV- and na- in nabebeteng, 'was drunk', from beteng, 'drunk'. However, some CVC reduplication is applied after the prefix is added to the beginning of the stem such as the ma- and CVC- in magmageyek, 'ticklish', from geyek, 'to tickle'. Some roots lose their first vowel when they are prefixed such as the e in emis, 'sweet, tasty', when prefixed to mam-is, 'sweet, tasty'. This is because the glottal metathesizes with the second consonant under phonological constraints. If the root is one-syllable or if it is vowel reduced, then the reduplication is applied after the predicative affixation such as the ma- and CVC- in matmatey, 'dying', from tey, 'dead'.

=== Suffixes ===
According to Janet Allen's Kankanaey: A Role and Reference Grammar Analysis, only "two predicating affixes are suffixes, -en and -an. Some roots drop their last vowel when suffixed, as in datngan (come upon, find) from dateng (arrive)."

=== Infixes ===
To change ayos, 'flow down', to omayos, 'flows down', the predicating affix -om- is infixed after the first consonant of the root word. In kinaan, 'removed', the perfective affix -in- is infixed after the first consonant of kaan, 'to remove'.

Pinmanapanakpak, 'was repeatedly hitting/slapping', is formed by first reduplicating the word panakpak, 'hit with slapping sound', into panapanakpak, and then the predicating infixation and aspect infixation are added. This is because reduplication usually precedes both the predicating infixation and aspect infixation. However, in this example, vowel reduction occurred when the infixes were added before the vowel, causing the infixes -in- and -om- to become -inm-. When forming binombomtak, 'were exploding', from betak, 'explode', the reducible vowel and reduplication steps were re-ordered so no vowel reduction was experienced.

Some highly marked affixes have an infixed glottal stop leading the second vowel such as when forming bangbang-a, 'little old pots, toy pots', from banga, 'pot'.

=== Circumfixes ===
A lot of affixes consist of a prefix or an infix, which is also followed by a suffix. These are called circumfixes and have their own unique meanings, not a combination of the two parts.

Examples taken from Janet Allen's Kankanaey: A Role and Reference Grammar Analysis.
Original (and meaning)	Circumfix	Circumfixed version (and meaning)
ila ('to see')	ka-...-an	ka-ila-an ('appearance')
oto ('to cook')	i-...-an	i-oto-an ('to cook for someone')

=== Predicate formation ===
The Kankanaey vocabulary is arranged by root morphemes, and points out the important semantic properties of each root. Kankanaey roots deeply rely on the combination with their affixes to determine their meaning in phrases and clauses. The predicates that form are determined by the interaction of the affixation to the semantic properties of the root that are relevant in its context. Aktionsart is a way to categorize event semantics, proposed by Vendler (1967), by if they are "happening" or are static, and it distinguishes them by their temporal properties and its dynamicity. According to Janet Allen's Kankanaey: A Role and Reference Grammar Analysis, "VVLP (1997) and Van Valin (2005) expanded the list of categories to reflect resultant situations, adding semelfactives and complex predicates–active accomplishments and causatives."

== Orthography ==
In 2016, the Commission on the Filipino Language published a standardized orthography for Kankanaey, titled Ortograpiya di Kankanaëy.

== Gallery ==
Cover of the Kankanay Hymnal.

A pile of Kankanay hymnals in the Church of Saint Mary, an Episcopal Church in Sagada, Mountain Province, Philippines.

The 23rd Psalm in the Kankanay Psalter.

== Bibliography ==
- Allen, Janet L. (2014). Kankanaey: A Role and Reference Grammar Analysis. SIL International Publications in Linguistics. Vol. 152. ISBN 978-1556712968.
