= Tropical Storm Mitag (2025) =

Pacific tropical storm in 2025

Severe Tropical Storm Mitag (Mirasol)
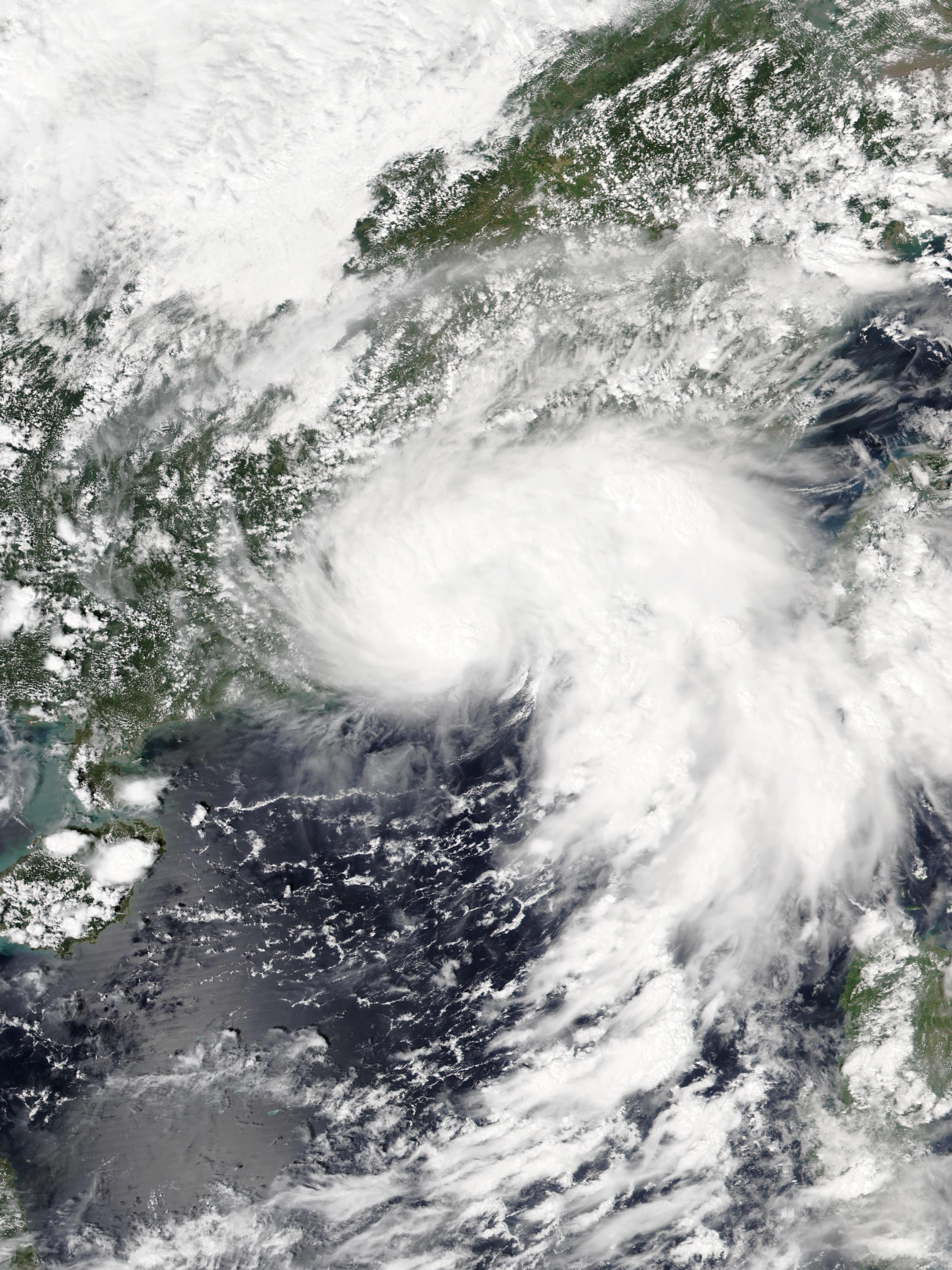
- Mitag approaching Guangdong, China on September 19

Meteorological history
- Formed: September 15, 2025
- Dissipated: September 20, 2025

Severe tropical storm
- 10-minute sustained (JMA)
- Highest winds: 95 km/h (60 mph)
- Lowest pressure: 992 hPa (mbar); 29.29 inHg

Tropical storm
- 1-minute sustained (SSHWS/JTWC)
- Highest winds: 85 km/h (50 mph)
- Lowest pressure: 994 hPa (mbar); 29.35 inHg

Overall effects
- Fatalities: 3 indirect
- Missing: 5
- Damage: $102 million (2025 USD) (Combined with Ragasa and Bualoi)
- Areas affected: Philippines, South China, Hong Kong, Macau
- Part of the 2025 Pacific typhoon season

Severe Tropical Storm Mitag, (Note: The name Mitag (Yapese: Mitaeg, [mitaːɣ]) was contributed by the Federated States of Micronesia and is a feminine given names meaning "my eyes" in Yapese.) (Note: Initially classified as a tropical storm, Mitag was upgraded on post-analysis to a severe tropical storm according to the Japan Meteorological Agency's Best Track data on December 18, 2025.) known in the Philippines as Tropical Storm Mirasol, was a moderate tropical cyclone that made landfall over South China after causing notable impacts in the Philippines in mid-September 2025. The seventeenth named storm of the 2025 Pacific typhoon season, Mitag originated from a low-pressure area (LPA) on September 16, prompting the issuance of a Tropical Cyclone Formation Alert by the Joint Typhoon Warning Center (JTWC) at 03:30 UTC. PAGASA upgraded the LPA to a tropical depression shortly after at 14:00 PHT (06:00 UTC), giving it the name Mirasol. At 05:00 PHT (21:00 UTC) on September 17, the storm made landfall in Casiguran, Aurora. The system emerged that same day, although disorganized. On 06:00 UTC on September 18, the Japan Meteorological Agency upgraded the depression into a tropical storm, giving it the name Mitag.

PAGASA issued Tropical Cyclone Wind Signal (TCWS) No. 1 (Note: With winds up to 39 to 61 kilometres per hour (21 to 33 knots; 24 to 38 miles per hour)) for 15 areas. The Office of Civil Defense (OCD) and the National Disaster Risk Reduction and Management Council (NDRRMC) placed their operations on blue alert. Food packs were prepared for response efforts in the storm while cops in southern Luzon were alerted. 121 individuals were evacuated. Strong winds were experienced in multiple parts in the provinces of Rizal and Isabela. 1,003 individuals were affected, with 171 of them inside evacuation centers. Four roads and 12 bridges were deemed unpassable. One person was declared missing while three people were killed indirectly by floods generated in Bukidnon.

== Meteorological history ==
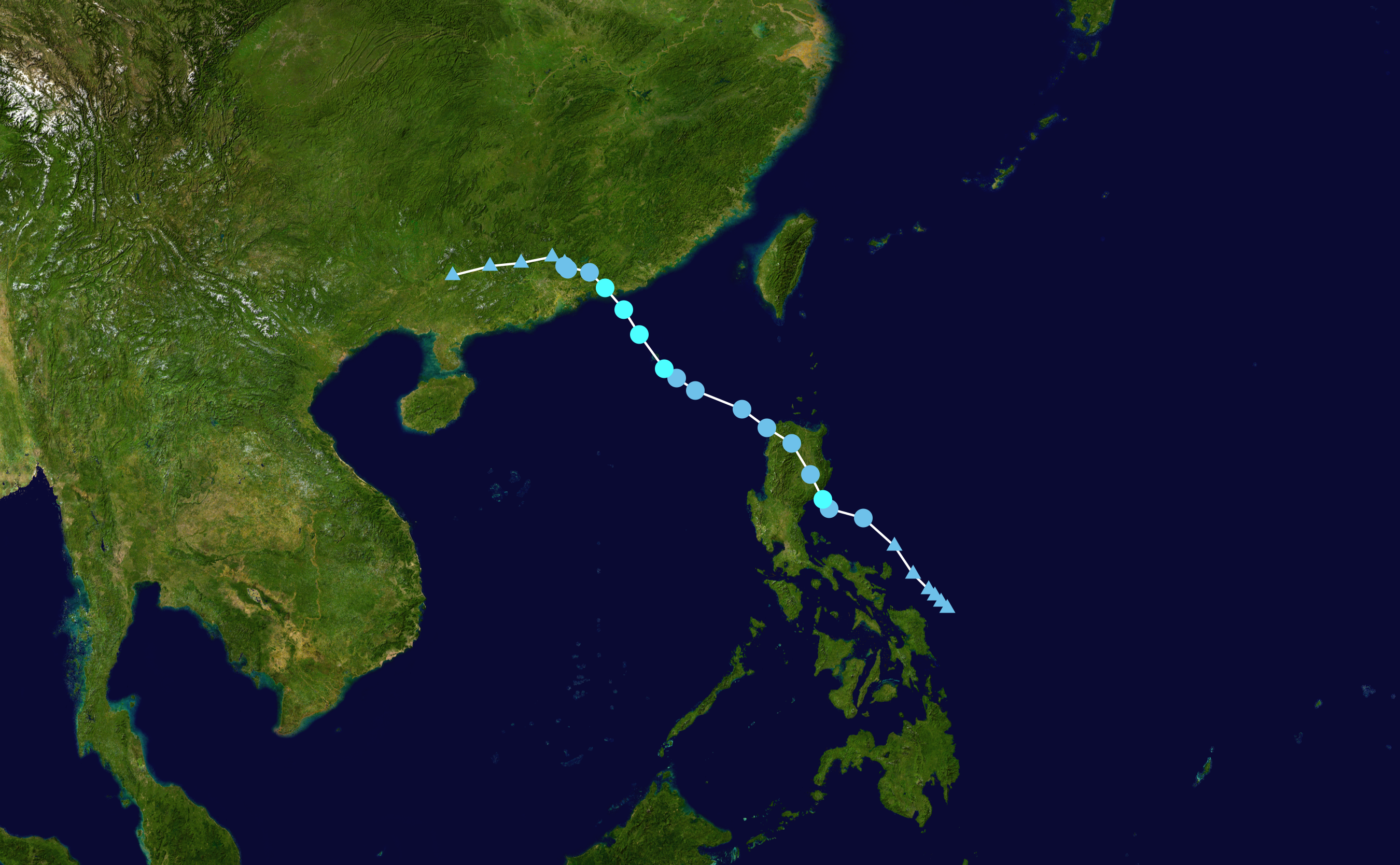
Map plotting the storm's track and intensity, according to the Saffir–Simpson scale Map key Saffir–Simpson scale Tropical depression (≤38 mph, ≤62 km/h) Tropical storm (39–73 mph, 63–118 km/h) Category 1 (74–95 mph, 119–153 km/h) Category 2 (96–110 mph, 154–177 km/h) Category 3 (111–129 mph, 178–208 km/h) Category 4 (130–156 mph, 209–251 km/h) Category 5 (≥157 mph, ≥252 km/h) Unknown Storm type Tropical cyclone Subtropical cyclone Extratropical cyclone, remnant low, tropical disturbance, or monsoon depression

A low-pressure area was formed northeast of Legazpi, Albay on September 16, 2025; it remained stationary. On 03:30 UTC, the Joint Typhoon Warning Center (JTWC) issued a Tropical Cyclone Formation Alert (TCFA) due to favorable conditions to develop along with low wind shear. Following the alert, PAGASA also upgraded the low-pressure area (LPA) to a tropical depression on 14:00 PHT (06:00 UTC), giving it the name Mirasol. The system shifted northwestward in the southern portion of a subtropical high. Even though it was still in a favorable environment, the system did not develop further. According to microwave imagery, the system had deep convective banding while the circulation was slightly tilted southeastward. A partially obscured low-level circulation center appeared under the rainband shortly after. Three hours later, the JTWC remarked that the system had classic signatures of a cyclone about to experience rapid intensification. The central dense overcast became colder and more symmetric as it was upgraded to a tropical storm.

On 03:20 PHT (19:20 UTC), the storm made landfall in Casiguran, Aurora as it moved west. Due to this, the storm maintained its intensity. According to the JTWC, the landfall quickly disrupted the storm's structure and its rapid intensification. The storm moved over Apayao before it re-emerged over the South China Sea during the late hours of September 17 with a weak low-level circulation center obscured by convective activity. The system had a lower wind speed of 29 mph (47 km/h). On September 18, the Japan Meteorological Agency (JMA) determined that the storm had a favorable environment for development. On 06:00 UTC that same day, the JMA upgraded the depression into a tropical storm, giving it the name Mitag. Upon entering the South China Sea, satellite imagery showed continued consolidation of Mitag with increased convective activity and improved equatorward outflow, despite being in a marginal environment. The JTWC later issued its final bulletin as Mitag encountered a marginally unfavorable environment influenced by dry air and land interaction. Mitag made landfall near Shanwei, Guangdong at Honghai Wan, China (Note: Chiuchowese: 红海湾; literally 'Red sea bay'.) as a weakening tropical storm. JMA continued to track Mitag as the agency downgraded it into a tropical depression.

== Preparations ==
=== Philippines ===
==== Highest Tropical Cyclone Wind Signal ====
Highest Tropical Cyclone Wind Signal issued by PAGASA for Mitag (Mirasol) in each province. The white line represents the best track.

PAGASA issued TCWS No. 1 for Batanes, Cagayan, Isabela, the northern portion of Nueva Vizcaya, the northern and central portions of Aurora, Apayao, Kalinga, Abra, Mountain Province, Ifugao, Ilocos Norte, Polillo Islands, the northern portion of Camarines Norte, the northeastern portion of Camarines Sur, and Catanduanes. The Office of Civil Defense (OCD) placed its operations on Blue Alert signifying the office was preparing for the incoming depression. The NDRRMC also raised an alert shortly after. The Department of Social Welfare and Development prepared 2,578,821 food packs to aid damages from the storm and placed their quick response teams on standby. Malacañang Palace Press Officer Claire Castro also announced that they had 114,623 ready-to-eat food boxes for citizens who might be stranded during sea travel in a press briefing. 313,064 non-food relief items were also prepared, such as blankets, hygiene kits, and kitchen kits. Police in southern Luzon were alerted by acting Chief of the Philippine National Police (PNP) Jose Melencio Nartatez. The entire province of Laguna and parts of Aurora and Quezon suspended classes. The province of Isabela was on high alert for the tropical depression. 121 individuals were evacuated across the Philippines. Classes in 132 municipalities were suspended, 39 from Ilocos Region (Region I) and Region II, and 13 for Central Luzon (Region III). Work in 41 municipalities were also suspended, most from Region I.

=== Hong Kong and Macau ===
On September 17, the Hong Kong Observatory (HKO) issued Standby Signal No. 1 at 21:20 HKT (13:20 UTC), and Macau's Meteorological and Geophysical Bureau (SMG) did the same at 00:00 MST on the following day (16:00 UTC). Both the HKO and SMG later upgraded their signals to Strong Wind Signal No. 3 on September 19 at 09:20 HKT (01:20 UTC) and 07:00 MST (23:00 UTC), respectively, as the storm approached the territories. A day later, the SMG canceled all tropical cyclone signals at 06:00 MST (22:00 UTC), the HKO downgraded the signal to Standby Signal No. 1 at 09:20 HKT (01:20 UTC) and cancelled all tropical cyclone signals at 10:20 HKT (02:20 UTC). In the morning on 20 September the Amber rainstorm signal was issued in Hong Kong at 04:05 HKT and remained in place until early afternoon at 15:10. The Amber signal was again in effect between 09:10 and 17:30 HKT on 21 September.

== Impact ==
=== Philippines ===
Residents of Casiguran, where the storm made landfall, experienced strong winds and rain which caused a power outage. In Teresa, Rizal, sandbag barriers failed to stop floods from affecting a public market. Teresa and Morong, Rizal were strongly affected by flood currents. Isabela experienced strong wind. A bridge in Echague, Isabela was closed due to the river overflowing. Motorists could not access flood-afflicted roads. The flooding caused 100 houses to be submerged. Overall, 1,003 individuals were affected, with 171 of them inside evacuation centers. Four roads and 12 bridges were deemed unpassable, most originating from Cagayan Valley (Region II). One person was reported missing from the floods. Three died while four others went missing from indirect flooding in Valencia, Bukidnon. Combined with Bualoi (Opong) and Ragasa (Nando), total damage in the Philippines reached ₱5 billion (US$101.52 million).

== Retirement ==
At their 58th Session in March 2026, the ESCAP/WMO Typhoon Committee announced that the name Mitag, along with seven others, would be retired from the naming lists for the Western Pacific. Its replacement name will be announced in 2027.

On March 19, 2026, PAGASA retired the name Mirasol from its rotating naming lists on account of the contributing damages with Typhoon Ragasa and Typhoon Bualoi, and will never be used again as a typhoon name within the PAR despite its first usage. It was replaced with Magyawan, which is derived from the Visayas goddess of the sea and death for the 2029 season.
