= Typhoon Ragasa =

Pacific typhoon in 2025

Typhoon Ragasa (Nando)
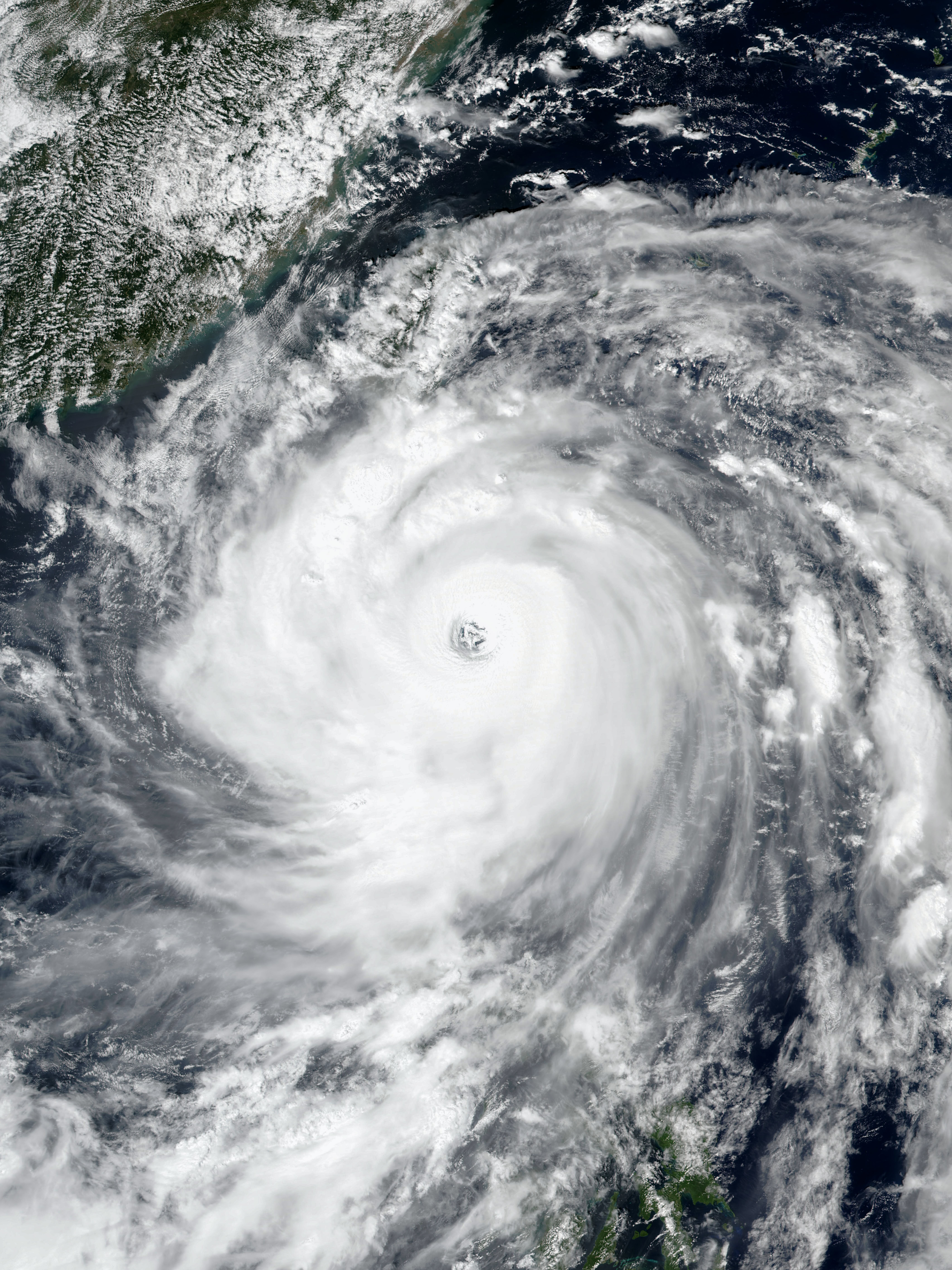
- Ragasa at peak intensity while approaching the Babuyan Islands on September 22

Meteorological history
- Formed: September 17, 2025
- Dissipated: September 25, 2025

Violent typhoon
- 10-minute sustained (JMA)
- Highest winds: 205 km/h (125 mph)
- Lowest pressure: 905 hPa (mbar); 26.72 inHg

Category 5-equivalent super typhoon
- 1-minute sustained (SSHWS/JTWC)
- Highest winds: 280 km/h (175 mph)
- Lowest pressure: 905 hPa (mbar); 26.72 inHg

Overall effects
- Fatalities: 40
- Injuries: 219
- Missing: 9
- Damage: >$2.86 billion (2025 USD)
- Areas affected: Philippines; particularly Northern Luzon; Taiwan; particularly Hualien County; Hong Kong; Macau; South China; Vietnam; Laos; Cambodia; Thailand
- Part of the 2025 Pacific typhoon season

Typhoon Ragasa, (Note: The name Ragasa (Tagalog: ragasa, [ɾɐɣɐˈsaʔ]) was contributed by the Philippines and means "sudden acceleration" in Tagalog.) known in the Philippines as Super Typhoon Nando, was an extremely powerful, large, and destructive tropical cyclone that severely affected the northernmost portions of Luzon island in the Philippines and Hualien County in Taiwan, and impacted Hong Kong, Macau, South China and Vietnam in late September 2025. It is also the second-strongest tropical cyclone worldwide in 2025, behind Hurricane Melissa in the Atlantic. Ragasa is the eighteenth named storm, fifth typhoon, and both the only violent typhoon and Category 5-equivalent super typhoon of the 2025 Pacific typhoon season.

Ragasa originated from an area of convection north of Yap that developed into a tropical depression on September 17. Moderate wind shear initially limited organization, but the system was upgraded to a tropical storm the following day and assigned the name Ragasa by the Japan Meteorological Agency (JMA). It gradually intensified over the next two days, becoming a typhoon on September 19. The storm underwent rapid intensification the next morning, reaching its peak intensity as a violent typhoon with a minimum central pressure of 905 hPa (26.7 inHg) and ten-minute sustained winds of 205 km/h (110 kn; 125 mph), and as a Category 5-equivalent super typhoon on the Saffir–Simpson scale with one-minute maximum sustained winds of 278 km/h (150 kn; 175 mph) early on September 22. Shortly thereafter, Ragasa entered an eyewall replacement cycle while retaining its intensity.

Ragasa later made landfall over Panuitan Island in Calayan, Cagayan, bringing heavy rains and strong winds over the area and Northern Luzon, and the highest No. 5 signal was issued over the Babuyan Islands. The storm started to weaken gradually as it entered the South China Sea, with a second eyewall replacement cycle having commenced. It later passed near the south of Hong Kong, where the Hong Kong Observatory issued the highest wind signal, Hurricane Signal No. 10, for the second time this year since Wipha two months before and the first occurrence of the signal being hoisted twice in a year since 1964. Ragasa made landfall over Hailing Island‌ in Yangjiang, Guangdong province, in southern China on September 24, and on the following day it crossed the coastal area of Guangxi province in China and Quảng Ninh province in Vietnam as a weakening tropical storm before dissipating in the mountain regions of Northern Vietnam.

Ragasa generated extensive flooding and landslides in the Philippines, Taiwan and Hong Kong that caused at least 29 fatalities and 219 injuries, with 18 people killed and 6 reported missing from a bursting of the Matai'an Creek Barrier Lake in Taiwan. As a result of the extensive damage it caused, PAGASA retired the name Nando from the rotating naming lists and was replaced with Nilad for the 2029 season. In March 2026, the name Ragasa was also retired, with a replacement name to be announced in 2027.

== Meteorological history ==
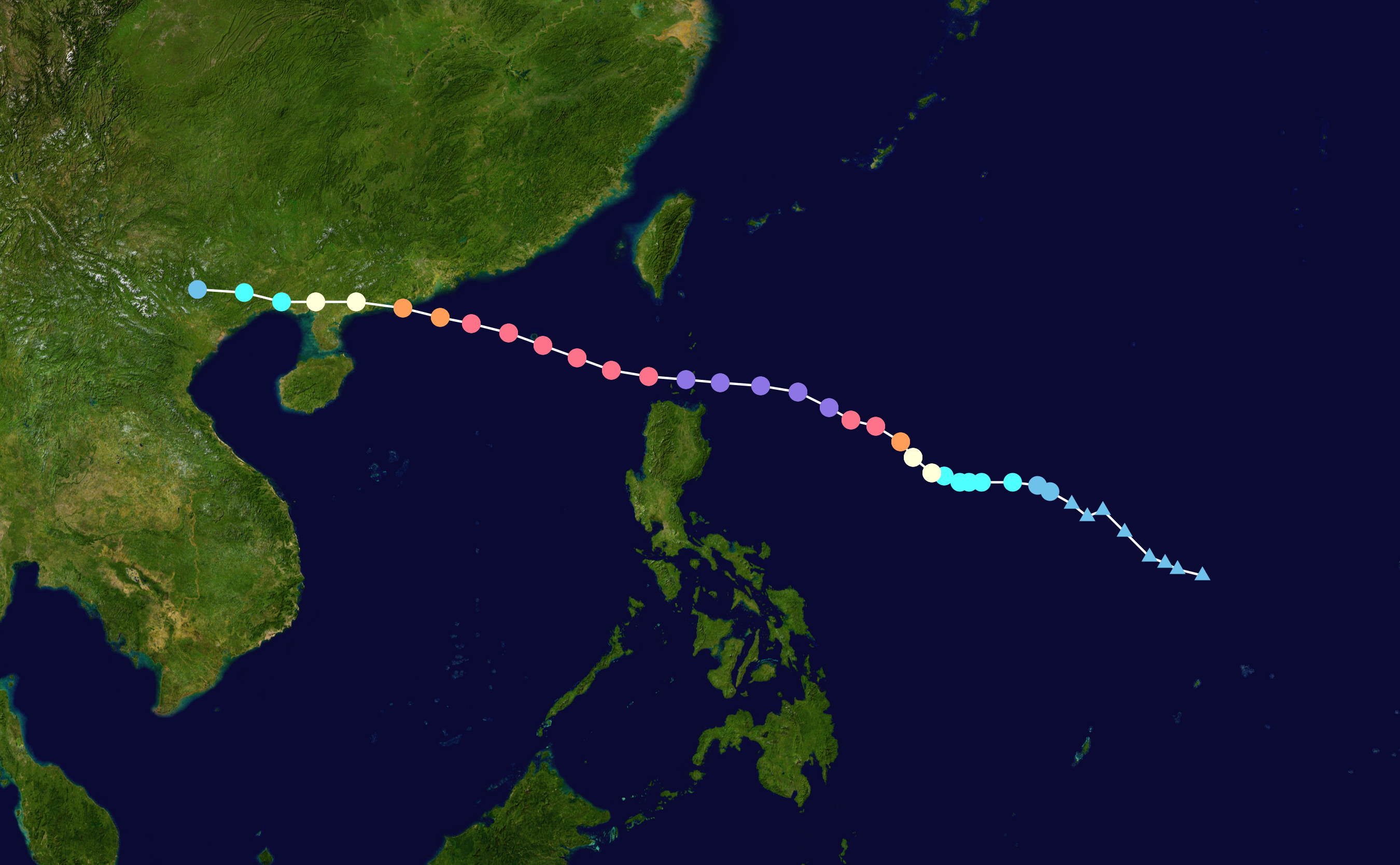
Map plotting the storm's track and intensity, according to the Saffir–Simpson scale Map key Saffir–Simpson scale Tropical depression (≤38 mph, ≤62 km/h) Tropical storm (39–73 mph, 63–118 km/h) Category 1 (74–95 mph, 119–153 km/h) Category 2 (96–110 mph, 154–177 km/h) Category 3 (111–129 mph, 178–208 km/h) Category 4 (130–156 mph, 209–251 km/h) Category 5 (≥157 mph, ≥252 km/h) Unknown Storm type Tropical cyclone Subtropical cyclone Extratropical cyclone, remnant low, tropical disturbance, or monsoon depression

On September 16, the Joint Typhoon Warning Center (JTWC) identified an area of convection approximately 333 nautical miles (617 km) north of Yap in the Federated States of Micronesia. Environmental analysis indicated favorable conditions for further development, including low vertical wind shear, improved equatorward outflow, and warm sea surface temperatures. The Japan Meteorological Agency (JMA) began issuing advisories the following day, classifying the disturbance as a tropical depression. Conditions later became marginal, with a poorly organized broad circulation center and weakening central convection. The system entered the Philippine Area of Responsibility (PAR) around 20:00 PHT (12:00 UTC), where the Philippine Atmospheric, Geophysical and Astronomical Services Administration (PAGASA) classified it as a tropical depression and assigned the name Nando. Upon moving into the Philippine Sea on September 18, Nando encountered more favorable conditions while tracking northwestward. At 22:05 JST (13:05 UTC), the JMA upgraded the system to a tropical storm and named it Ragasa, the replacement for Hagibis after it was retired following the 2019 season. The JTWC designated it as 24W later that day at 18:00 UTC. Ragasa continued to consolidate, supported by strong equatorward outflow as it tracked west-northwestward.

Typhoon Ragasa undergoing an eyewall replacement cycle as a Category 5 on September 21

At 21:00 UTC on September 19, the JTWC upgraded Ragasa to a minimal typhoon as an eye-like feature began to form. The JMA upgraded the system to a typhoon at 15:00 JST (06:00 UTC) on September 20. Rapid intensification ensued as the typhoon developed a well-defined eye within an intense central dense overcast (CDO). By 08:00 PHT on September 21 (00:00 UTC), PAGASA upgraded Ragasa to a super typhoon. At 09:00 UTC, the JTWC likewise upgraded it to a Category 5-equivalent super typhoon, with estimated one-minute sustained winds of 260 km/h (140 kn) and a minimum central pressure of 922 hPa (27.23 inHg), the first such instance during the season. Multispectral imagery indicated that Ragasa moved west-northwestward while exhibiting a looping trochoidal motion, characterised by a wobbling, spiral-like track. Around this time, a drifting buoy with the designation number 7810602 passed through the eye of Ragasa and measured an unofficial pressure of 900.3 hPa (26.59 inHg). While maintaining Category 5 intensity, Ragasa underwent an eyewall replacement cycle early on September 22, with satellite data showing a symmetric ring of convection with cloud tops near −80 °C (−112 °F), an eye temperature of 16–17 °C (61–63 °F), and well-defined spiral banding. As it moved west, satellite imagery showed slight weakening of core convection, with cooler cloud tops and a more asymmetric structure, though the 40-nautical-mile-wide (74 km; 46 mi) eye remained intact. Meanwhile, the JMA classified Ragasa as a violent typhoon at 09:00 JST (00:00 UTC), estimating ten-minute sustained winds of 205 km/h (110 kn; 125 mph) and a central pressure of 905 hPa (26.72 inHg).

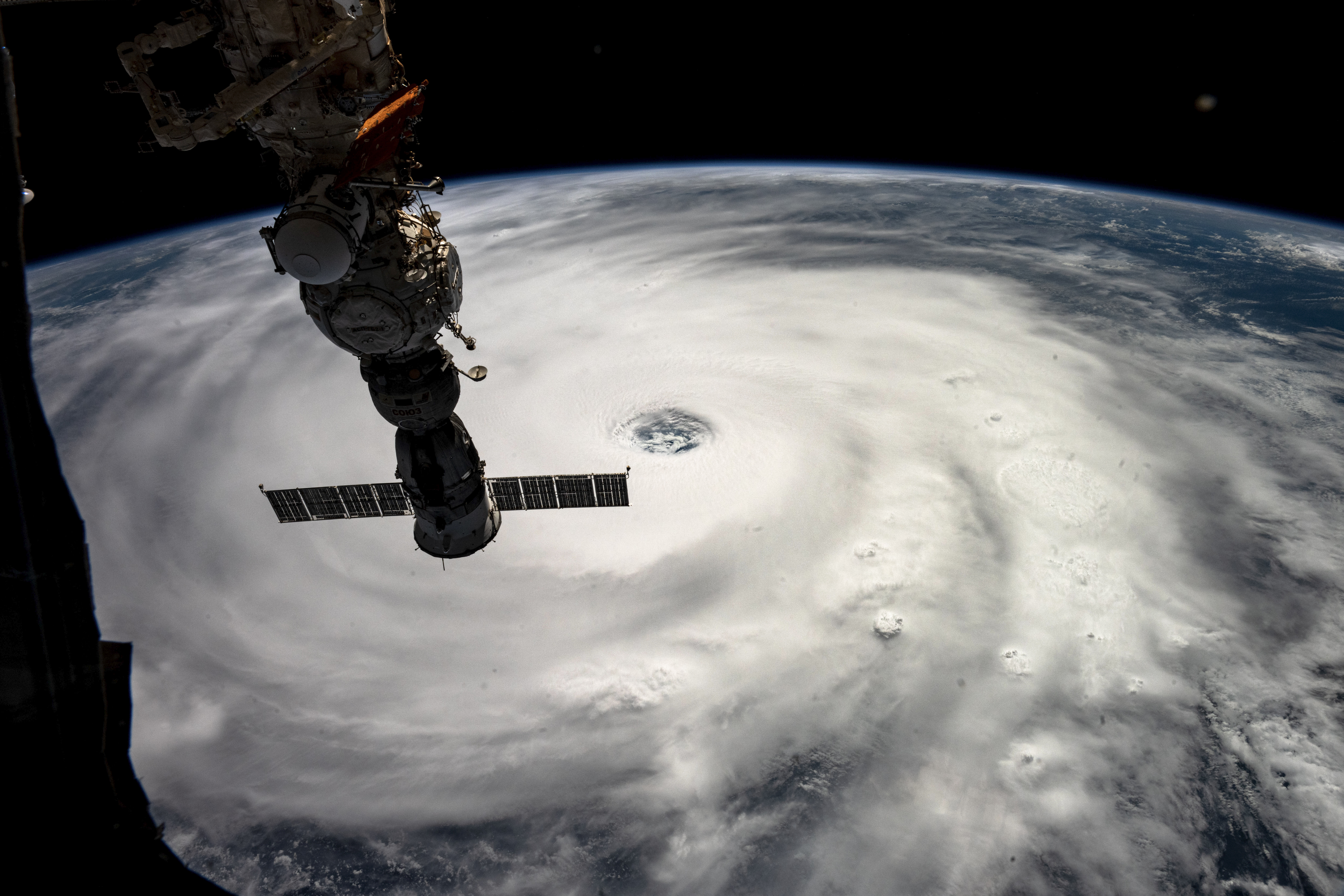
Typhoon Ragasa displaying its well defined eye over the Philippine Sea on September 22.

Radar imagery of Typhoon Ragasa making landfall over Calayan, Cagayan on September 22.

At 15:00 PHT (07:00 UTC), Ragasa made landfall at peak intensity on Panuitan Island in Calayan, Cagayan. Following landfall, satellite imagery indicated that Ragasa had slightly weakened and entered another eyewall replacement cycle as the eye became cloud-filled. Shortly after this cycle, the typhoon maintained steady movement, forming a 25-nautical-mile-wide (46 km; 29 mi) symmetric eye. Satellite imagery also depicted strong radial outflow and deeper moisture concentrated on the storm's southern side as it began to weaken gradually. Its eye subsequently contracted to 19-nautical-mile-wide (35 km; 22 mi), with intermittent cloud cover obscuring the ocean surface, though it remained a Category 4-equivalent typhoon while tracking west-northwestward into the South China Sea. In their subsequent advisory, the JTWC noted that Ragasa still maintained a 25-nautical-mile-wide (46 km; 29 mi) eye, with an asymmetric CDO over the eyewall. As it passed south of Hong Kong, satellite imagery showed a large, circular convective system with strong banding fully encircling its center. Its eye later became fully-filled as it neared the southern coastline of China. At 17:00 CST on September 24, Ragasa made landfall over Hailing Island‌ in Yangjiang, Guangdong province, China, followed by a third landfall in Beihai, Guangxi on the morning of September 25. According to the Vietnamese National Center for Hydro-Meteorological Forecasting (NCHMF), the system weakened into a tropical depression as it entered the waters close to Quảng Ninh province in Vietnam on the morning of September 25. At 12:00 ICT (05:00 UTC), NCHMF considered the tropical depression to have made landfall over Quảng Ninh Province. Later, rapid weakening later ensued as it interacted with land, causing the JTWC to discontinue warnings later the same day. The JMA also ceased warnings at 21:00 JST (12:00 UTC) as the system was reportedly dissipated. It was last noted as a low-pressure area by the HKO at 12:00 UTC on September 25 at 22.0°N 106.1°E, approximately 65 nautical miles (120 km) north of Hanoi, Vietnam.

== Preparations ==
=== Philippines ===
==== Highest Tropical Cyclone Wind Signal ====
Highest Tropical Cyclone Wind Signal issued by PAGASA for Ragasa (Nando) in each province. The white line represents the best track.

PAGASA warned of possible torrential rainfall and strong winds to be brought by Ragasa, along with the potential impact of the southwest monsoon. It also warned of storm surges of up to 3 m (9.8 ft) affecting the coasts of Batanes, Cagayan, Ilocos Norte and Ilocos Sur.

On September 20 at 17:00 PHT, Tropical Cyclone Wind Signal No. 1 was issued over the entire provinces of Abra, Apayao, the Babuyan Islands, Batanes, Cagayan, Ifugao, Ilocos Norte, Isabela, Kalinga, Mountain Province, Quirino, northeastern Nueva Vizcaya, and the northern and central portions of both Aurora and Catanduanes. As the storm continued to approach Luzon, the signal was also hoisted over northern Ilocos Sur. The signal was further extended at 23:00 PHT to include Benguet, the entire provinces of Ilocos Sur and Nueva Vizcaya, La Union, eastern Pangasinan, and northern Nueva Ecija.

On September 21 at 05:00 PHT (21:00 UTC), PAGASA upgraded the warning to Signal No. 2 for the entire provinces of Batanes, the Babuyan Islands, Cagayan, as well as eastern portions of Apayao and Kalinga, and northeastern Isabela. At the same time, Signal No. 1 was raised over the entire provinces of Aurora and Pangasinan, northern and central Nueva Ecija and Tarlac, northern Zambales, and the remaining areas previously under Signal No. 2. Signal No. 2 was also hoisted over the entire province of Apayao, northern Ilocos Norte, and northern and eastern Isabela six hours later. PAGASA further escalated the alert by raising Signal No. 3 over the entire province of Batanes, the Babuyan Islands, and the northeastern portion of mainland Cagayan. Signal No. 2 was raised over the entire provinces of Abra, Apayao, Ilocos Norte, Kalinga, northern Ilocos Sur, eastern Mountain Province, and the rest of Cagayan. Meanwhile, Signal No. 1 was issued for the entire provinces of La Union, Nueva Ecija, Pangasinan and Tarlac, the northern portions of Bulacan, Pampanga, and Quezon, as well as the Polillo Islands.

At 23:00 PHT, Signal No. 3 was raised in the northern and central portions of Apayao and Cagayan, and northern Ilocos Norte. Signal No. 2 was raised in the central portions of Isabela and Mountain Province and eastern Ifugao, while Signal No. 1 was raised in the provinces of Bulacan, Pampanga, and Zambales. The following day, at 08:00 PHT (00:00 UTC), for the first time during the season, PAGASA raised Wind Signal No. 5, the highest category, over the northern and central portions of the Babuyan Islands, while Signal No. 4 was raised over the northeastern and northwestern portion of mainland Cagayan, northernmost Ilocos Norte, southeastern Batanes, and the rest of the Babuyan Islands. Signal No. 5 was extended to include the entirety of the Babuyan Islands at 11:00 PHT (03:00 UTDC). All wind signals were removed as Ragasa moved away from the Philippines on September 24.

The National Disaster Risk Reduction and Management Council (NDRRMC) issued alerts for possible flooding in several barangays of the National Capital Region that could be brought by the typhoon, specifically in Muntinlupa, Taguig, Manila, Mandaluyong, Marikina, Pasig, San Juan, Quezon City, Caloocan, Malabon, Navotas, and Valenzuela. The Office of Civil Defense (OCD) also responded, ramping up emergency operations during the typhoon's rapid intensification over the Philippine Sea. An emergency meeting was convened in Quezon City on the afternoon of September 20 to ensure preparedness and safety measures against the combined effects of the typhoon, the southwest monsoon, and a low-pressure area – formerly Tropical Storm Mitag (Mirasol). At least 111 families, or about 380 individuals, were evacuated from parts of the Ilocos Region, Central Luzon, and Calabarzon. The Department of Interior and Local Government issued advisories on evacuations and a no-sailing policy, while the Department of Environment and Natural Resources warned the mining sector of possible hazards. The Ambuklao, Binga, and Magat Dams opened their gates as a precaution.

The Philippine National Police (PNP) also prepared for the typhoon's impact. PNP chief Jose Melencio Nartatez directed local police units to ready personnel, vehicles, and communication assets for possible disaster evacuations in high-risk areas. Police officers also prepared for worst-case scenarios, working with local government units on evacuation and rescue operations.

Many areas in Luzon, including Metro Manila, and the Visayan province of Antique, declared class suspensions at all levels and government work cancellations on September 22, due to the possible impacts of Ragasa and the enhanced southwest monsoon. Thirty-two schools were also converted into evacuation centers.

=== Taiwan ===
The Forestry and Nature Conservation Agency advised the public not to visit forests as a precaution for the approaching typhoon. Consequently, hiking trails were closed.

On September 20, the Central Weather Administration (CWA) announced that it expected to issue sea and land warnings on September 21 as the typhoon neared Taiwan. Forecaster Liu Pei-teng warned residents of Hualien and Taitung counties to prepare for extremely heavy rain and strong winds between September 22 and 24, with heavy rainfall also expected in the mountainous areas of Yilan and Pingtung counties, and Kaohsiung. The sea and land warnings were issued at 08:30 and 17:30 TST (00:30 and 09:30 UTC), respectively, on September 21. Authorities ordered the evacuation of 300 people from Hualien County.

=== Hong Kong ===
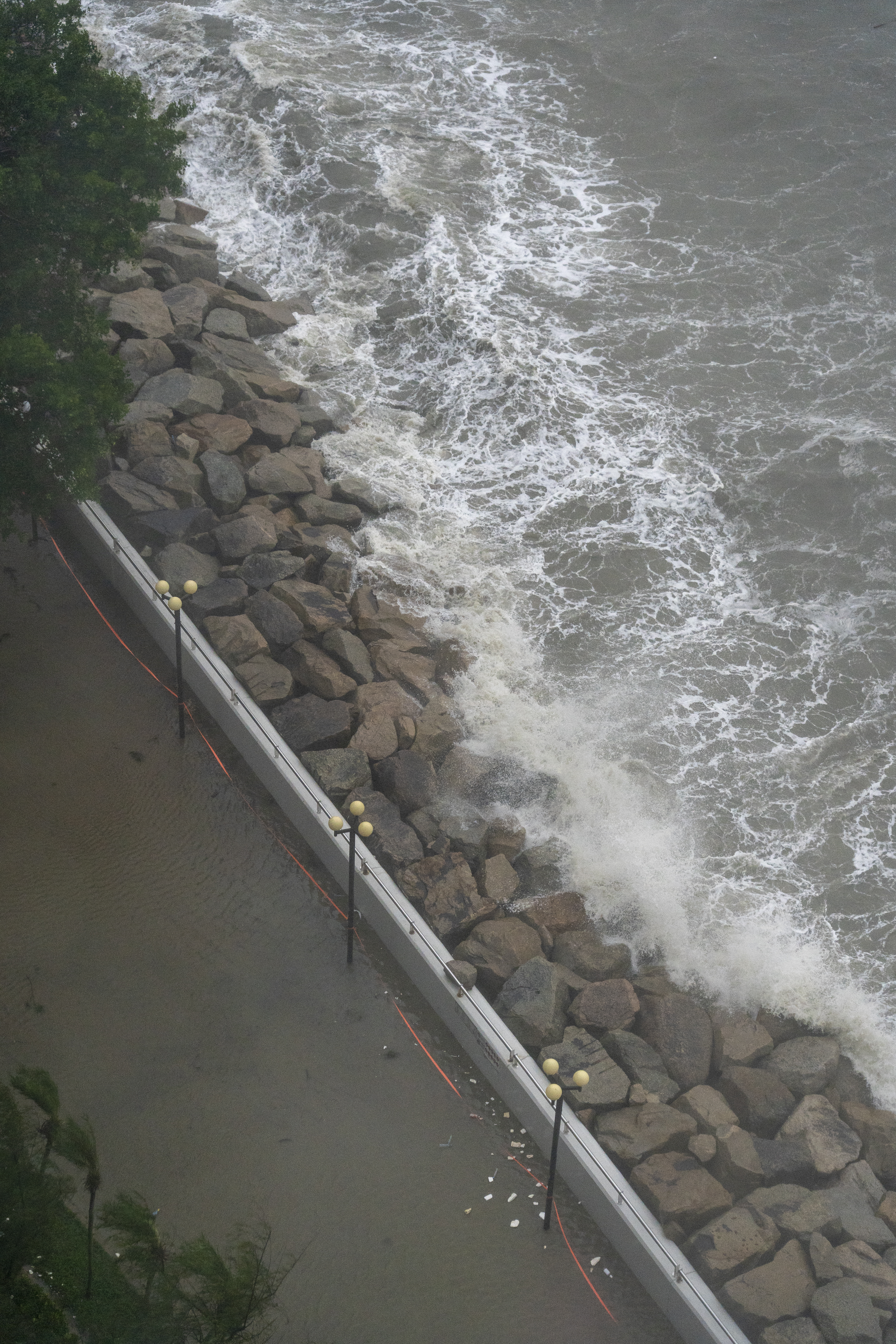
Minor flooding due to high waves from Ragasa in Heng Fa Chuen, Hong Kong

The Hong Kong Observatory (HKO) began issuing warnings as early as September 17 regarding the possible impact of Ragasa, which was forecast to reach super typhoon strength near the Pearl River estuary‌ the following week, along with the associated storm surge during the spring tide under a new moon. At that time, the storm was still more than 1,200 nautical miles (2,200 km) away from the territory, before passing through the Balintang Channel and prior to being named by the JMA. The warnings were reiterated on September 18 and 19. The HKO warned that the storm would approach on September 24 within 100 km (54 nautical miles) south of the territory as a super typhoon, with winds reaching up to 175 km/h (94 kn). The territory was expected to experience gale-force winds, heavy rain, thunderstorms, swells, and a significant storm surge, with rough seas and large waves. A special weather advisory was issued at 16:30 HKT on September 19 while the typhoon signal for Tropical Storm Mitag was still in effect. This marked the first time since Typhoon Mangkhut in 2018 that warnings were issued before a storm entered the Luzon Strait.

On September 22, the HKO issued Standby Signal No. 1 at 12:20 HKT (02:20 UTC). Later that day, due to circulation changes and the increasing wind speed of the typhoon, Strong Wind Signal No. 3 was hoisted at 21:40 HKT (13:40 UTC). The following day, the HKO issued Northwest Gale or Storm Signal No. 8 at 14:20 HKT (06:20 UTC). The signal was later upgraded to Increasing Gale or Storm Signal No. 9 at 01:40 the following day (17:40 UTC). At 02:40 HKT (18:40 UTC), Hurricane Signal No. 10, the highest storm signal was issued while the storm was 120 km (75 mi) from Hong Kong. This made Ragasa the furthest typhoon from Hong Kong to ever trigger the signal and the first time that Signal No. 10 was triggered when a storm was more than 100 km (62 mi) away from Hong Kong, surpassing the old record of 100 km held jointly by Typhoon Mangkhut in 2018 and Typhoon Vicente in 2012. The signal lasted for 10 hours and 40 minutes, the second-longest duration, only behind the record of 11 hours during Tropical Storm York in 1999. It also marked the first time since Typhoons Ruby and Dot in 1964 that Hurricane Signal No. 10 was issued twice in a single year, having seen off Tropical Storm Wipha earlier in July 2025. The Amber rainstorm signal was hoisted five minutes later and cancelled at 11:50 HKT (03:50 UTC), reissued at 15:20 HKT (07:20 UTC) and cancelled for the second time at 20:00 HKT (12:00 UTC). Signal No. 10 was downgraded to Southeast Signal No. 8 at 13:20 HKT (05:20 UTC). As Ragasa began to move away from the territory, the signal was further downgraded to Signal No. 3 at 20:20 HKT (12:20 UTC), Signal No. 1 at 08:20 HKT (00:20 UTC) on September 25, and finally, the Monsoon Signal at 11:20 HKT (03:20 UTC), which lasted until 07:45 HKT on September 26. The signal was again hoisted between 11:45 and 14:50 HKT that day.

On September 24, the "Special Announcement on Flooding in the northern New Territories"‌ was issued at 05:35 HKT and later cancelled at 22:00 HKT. The Landslip Warning‌‌ was also hoisted at 09:15 HKT (01:15 UTC) and cancelled at 06:30 HKT (22:30 UTC) on the next day.

The HKO noted on September 22 that gale- to storm-force winds would prevail on September 24, with hurricane-force winds possible offshore and at high elevations. In preparation for the super typhoon, Chief Secretary Eric Chan chaired a meeting of the steering committee on handling extreme weather on September 21 to review and coordinate contingency measures. These preparations included preventive actions against flooding, landslides, and other hazards, with a focus on ensuring the safety of buildings, particularly those on higher ground. The Drainage Services Department (DSD) deployed up to 200 response teams to handle flooding and drainage works across various districts, including robots on standby to monitor high-risk flood-prone areas. Double the usual number of sandbags were distributed in flood-prone locations such as Tai O, Lei Yue Mun, Sam Mun Tsai, Tai Po Market, Kar Wo Lei, low-lying areas of Yuen Long, To Tau Wan, Nam Wai, and Heung Chung. The DSD and the Civil Engineering and Development Department (CEDD) coordinated closely with other departments to implement appropriate measures to mitigate the potential storm surge threat. As a result of storm surge along the Shing Mun River Channel, the bicycle lanes on both sides of the channel were closed in the small hours on September 24.

Cathay Pacific announced that it would cancel 500 departing flights from Hong Kong starting at 18:00 HKT on September 23, while Hong Kong Airlines said it would suspend all departures from the territory. The UK Foreign, Commonwealth and Development Office (FCDO) also issued a travel advisory regarding Ragasa.

In preparation for the typhoon, most passenger flights at Hong Kong International Airport (HKIA) on Chek Lap Kok were suspended starting at 18:00 HKT (10:00 UTC) on September 23, with operations expected to remain severely affected until at least 06:00 HKT on September 25 (22:00 UTC). This 36-hour closure marked the longest in HKIA's history, leading to widespread flight cancellations across all airlines operating at the airport. Several Hong Kong based airlines, including Cathay Pacific, Hong Kong Airlines, and Greater Bay Airlines, relocated their aircraft out of HKIA to other airports to prevent them from being damaged during the typhoon.

=== Macau ===
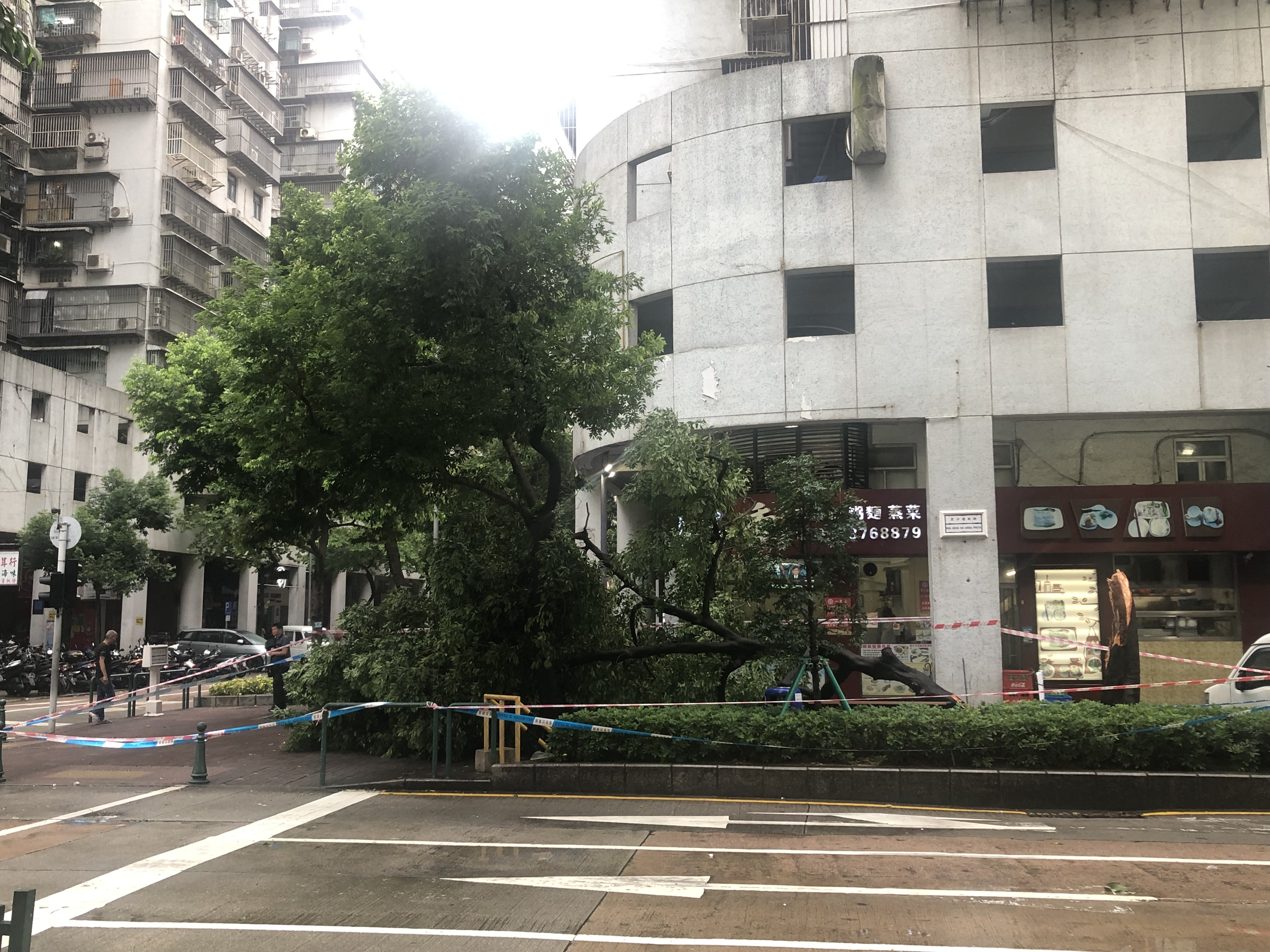
Downed trees in Areia Preta knocked by Ragasa

The Meteorological and Geophysical Bureau (Note: Portuguese: Direcção dos Serviços Meteorológicos e Geofísicos) (SMG) warned on September 19 at 17:40 MST of storm surge, heavy rain, and thunderstorms expected from Ragasa in the following week. The next day, the SMG cautioned that water levels from the storm surge could be comparable to those observed during Typhoon Hato in 2017 or Typhoon Mangkhut in 2018. On September 21, the government urged all residents to take precautionary measures, such as storing food and potable water. On September 22, the SMG issued Signal No. 1 at 15:30 MST (07:30 UTC). The following day, the SMG raised Signal No. 3 at 05:00 MST (21:00 UTC) and the orange storm surge warning signal at 13:00 MST, and later issued Signal No. 8 Northwest at 17:00 MST (09:00 UTC) and the red storm surge warning at 18:00 MST. People in low-lying areas were ordered to evacuate. The state of prevention was declared and took effect from 13:00 MST.

On September 22, the SMG advised residents living in high-rise buildings to prepare for severe impacts from typhoon-force winds. The day before, on September 21, police officials urged residents to stock non-perishable food and drinks, fully charged power banks, flashlights, medicines, and first-aid kits in case of power outages or water supply disruptions. They also advised those in low-lying areas to secure household furniture and appliances without delay. Residents were further instructed to prepare go-bags for possible quick evacuation, including identity cards and other essential documents.

The directorate further cautioned on September 23 that storm surge might reach a height of 2.5 m (8 ft 2 in). The Companhia de Electricidade de Macau (CEM) suspended power supplies to low-lying areas as a precautionary measure.

The No. 9 signal was hoisted at 04:00 MST on September 24, followed by the highest signal the No. 10 signal an hour and a half later. The lower deck of Ponte de Sai Van was closed to traffic upon the hoisting of the No. 9 signal. At 16:00 MST (08:00 UTC), the No.10 Signal was replaced by the No.8 Southeast Signal. At 15:00 UTC (23:00 MST), Ragasa began moving away from the region, and the Strong Wind Signal was further reduced to No. 3, then cancelled by 22:00 UTC (06:00 MST).

=== China ===
The China Meteorological Administration described Ragasa as the "King of Storms". Fifty ferry routes were suspended in Fujian. A shutdown of schools, businesses and transport systems was implemented in parts of Guangdong. In Shenzhen, 400,000 people were evacuated while classes were suspended in Jiangmen and Zhuhai. In Zhuhai buildings over ten stories were evacuated. Streets along Yangjiang were seen empty, and its railway station was vacant as rail transport was suspended throughout Guangdong. More than 2.16 million people were evacuated, while more than 80,000 vessels were relocated. Around 38,000 emergency personnel and 8,900 vehicles were placed on standby. Several schools, businesses and tourism activities were also closed in Guangxi.

=== Vietnam ===
On September 20, the National Center for Hydro-Meteorological Forecasting (NCHMF) began closely monitoring the development of the typhoon, although it was still far from the country. The National Civil Defense Steering Committee issued a directive to the People's Committees of the provinces from Quảng Ninh to Lâm Đồng, urging them to respond to the typhoon as it moved towards the South China Sea. (Note: Vietnamese: Biển Đông, lit. 'East Sea')

== Impact ==
Casualties and damages by country
Country	Deaths	Missing	Damage (USD)	Source
Philippines	22	1	$12.98 million	
Taiwan	18	6	$20.57 million	
Hong Kong	0	0	$257–386 million	
Macau	0	0	$109.8 million	
China	0	0	$2.46 billion	
Vietnam	Unknown	Unknown	Unknown	
Total	40	7	>$2.86–2.98 billion	

=== Philippines ===
Typhoon Ragasa (Nando) nearing and making landfall in Panuitan Island in Calayan, Cagayan on September 22.

Ragasa caused flooding and power outages in parts of Luzon, including blackouts that affected the entirety of Calayan Island and the provinces of Apayao and Batanes. Around 746,000 households in northern Luzon lost power. Three power transmission lines in Abra and Cagayan were rendered unavailable. Waves measuring between 2.5–3 m (8 ft 2 in – 9 ft 10 in) high were observed in coastal areas of Cagayan. Extensive damage was reported in Babuyan Island and Camiguin de Babuyanes, with authorities warning of food shortages in Babuyan. Damage to energy infrastructure reached around ₱2 million (US$40,609.14). The NDRRMC said 692,707 people in 11 regions were affected by the storm. Agricultural damage in Ilocos Norte alone reached ₱40.2 million (US$816,243.65), while in Cagayan Valley, agricultural damage amounted to ₱597 million (US$12.12 million). Authorities officially recorded 11 deaths, 11 injuries and one missing. Thirty-four bridges were damaged and rendered impassable. Three roads in northern Luzon were also rendered impassable. More than 42,000 people were evacuated. Baguio recorded up to 327 mm (12.9 in) of rainfall within a 24-hour period. A state of calamity was declared in Calayan, Cagayan, and was subsequently expanded to include the entire province. A state of calamity was also declared in Ilocos Norte and Dagupan. At least 2,418 houses in Cagayan Valley were damaged or destroyed, with 2,227 of them from Calayan alone. At least 40 flights were disrupted nationwide.

One person died after being struck by a fallen tree branch in Babuyan Island. One person drowned in San Mariano, Isabela after falling into a swollen river. Another died after being struck by lightning in Aringay, La Union. One house was destroyed while two others were damaged in La Union. Seven people died while three others went missing after a fishing boat capsized in Santa Ana, Cagayan. Tornadoes damaged 48 houses in Santa Maria, Ilocos Sur. In Tuba, Benguet, one person was killed while nine others were injured in landslides that destroyed several vehicles while power outages occurred in parts of Baguio. Cagayan disaster chief Rueli Rapsing said his team was prepared for "the worst". In Malate, Manila, a billboard was toppled by strong winds. A passenger vessel ran aground off Real, Quezon. A flood control structure collapsed in Kayapa, Nueva Vizcaya, partially damaging an adjacent church.

Combined with storms Mitag (Mirasol) and Bualoi (Opong), total damage in the Philippines reached ₱5 billion (US$101.52 million).

=== Taiwan ===
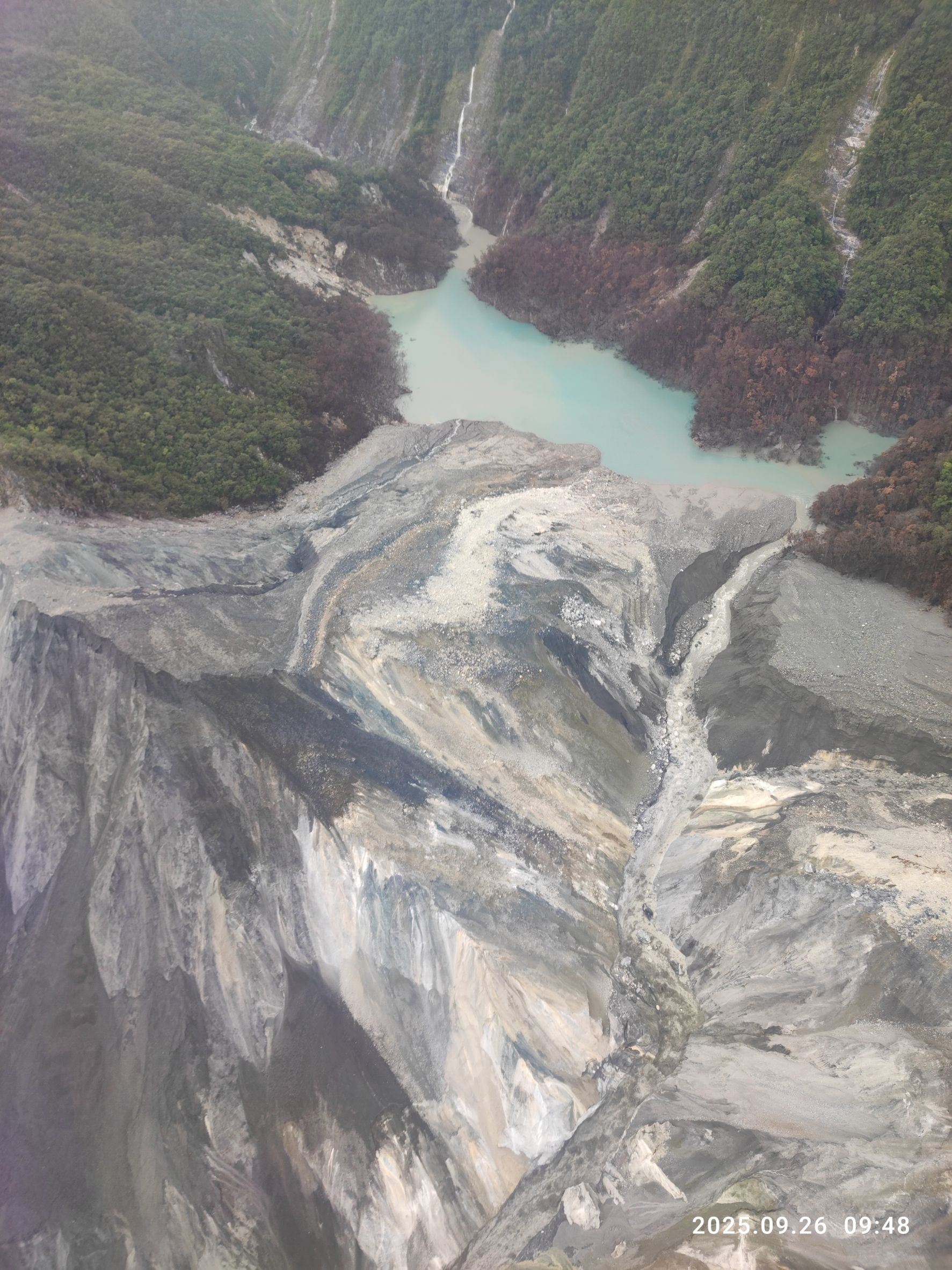
Matai'an Creek Barrier Lake on September 26

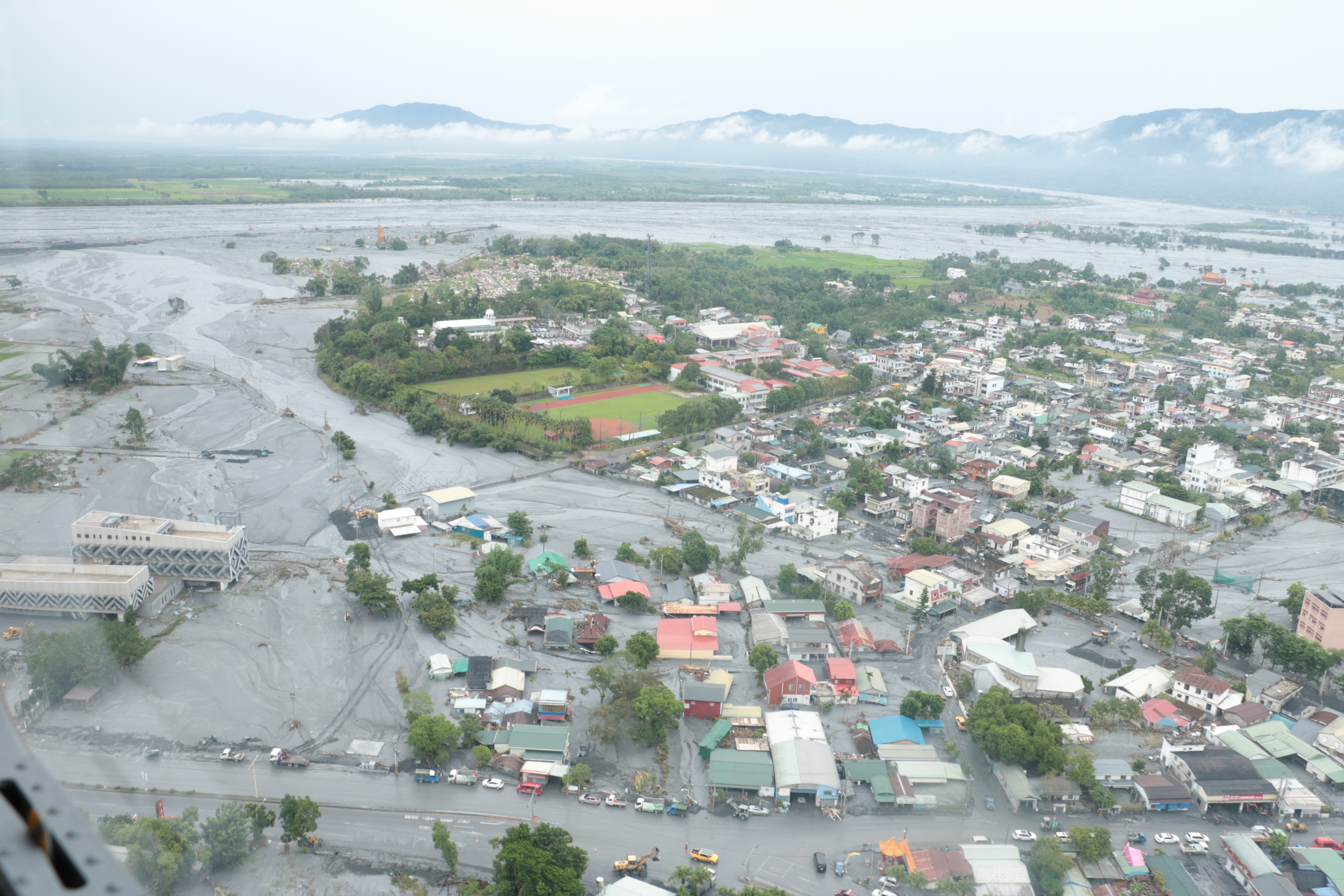
Aerial view of Guangfu Township on September 26

Across Taiwan, more than 8,000 people were evacuated. Parts of Hualien County recorded up to 700 mm (28 in) of rainfall, while parts of southern and eastern Taiwan recorded 500–600 mm (20–24 in) of precipitation. At least 11,363 households experienced power outages. A suspected tornado blew off roofs and road signages in Taitung City. More than 160 flights at Taoyuan International Airport were cancelled.

In Hualien County, the Matai'an Creek Barrier Lake, which formed following a massive landslide caused by Tropical Storm Wipha in July, overflowed, sweeping away a bridge and several vehicles along Provincial Highway 9 and causing flooding in Guangfu, Fenglin and Wanrong Townships. Several areas were buried in up to 5 m (16 ft) of mud. At least 18 people were killed, 107 were injured, six were missing and 300 were stranded by this event. Authorities said that 60 million tonnes of the lake's total water volume of about 91 million tonnes was discharged, while 60% of Guangfu's population, equivalent to 5,200 people, were forced to seek shelter in the higher floors of their residences. The extent of the disaster led to it being characterised as "a typhoon from the mountains". Around 4,000 people in the area lost access to water supply. The total economic losses in Taiwan added up to NT$638 million (US$20.57 million).

=== Hong Kong ===
Three people were admitted to hospital under Gale or Storm Signal No. 8 Northwest. Reflux of drainage was observed in Heng Fa Chuen as a result of swells and storm surge, and pavements were flooded. Waves measuring between 2–3 m (6 ft 7 in – 9 ft 10 in) high were observed in coastal areas. Due to a storm surge along the Shing Mun River Channel, the bicycle lanes on both sides of the channel were closed on September 24. The Fullerton Ocean Park Hotel was inundated by a storm surge. Across the territory, 1,200 fallen trees, 85 flooding incidents, and one landslide were recorded. At least 101 people were injured, while 900 others were taken to 50 emergency shelters.

Storm surge up to 3.4 metres (11 ft 2 in) above the chart datum was observed in Victoria Harbour (at Quarry Bay), whereas in Tolo Harbour (at Tai Po Kau) and Deep Bay (at Tsim Bei Tsui) it had reached 3.8 metres (12 ft 6 in).

For the first time people were charged. Four were charged for child neglect after video footages which circulated online were examined showing children being taken to the waterfront, in Ap Lei Chau (within South Horizons) and in Kennedy Town (on the New Praya) respectively, during the storm. Another was charged for trespassing in a closed-off beach. Damages from the typhoon are estimated at HK$2–3 billion (US$257–386 million).

=== Macau ===
Around 642 people were evacuated to shelters, with storm surges recorded in the territory. Ragasa shut down casinos in Macau, causing at least MOP$880 million, or US$109.8 million in losses for the gaming industry alone according to analysts.

=== China ===
At 12:00 CST on September 24 the coastal city of Jiangmen experienced its highest wind speed ever recorded at 67 m/s (220 ft/s), equivalent to 241 km/h (150 mph). Power outages occurred in Jiangmen and Yangjiang, affecting at least 56,000 households. Over 50,000 trees in Yangjiang were uprooted by the typhoon.

Direct economic losses in China by Ragasa reached CN¥15.88 billion (US$2.46 billion).

=== Vietnam ===
Ragasa also affected Vietnam on September 25, causing winds and brought rainfall. On Bạch Long Vĩ Island of Haiphong, sustained winds reached Beaufort force 7 with peak gusts reaching Beaufort force 8; the maximum wave height recorded was 2 m (6 ft 7 in). In Quảng Hà‌ of Quảng Ninh province, winds reached Beaufort force 6 with peak gusts reaching Beaufort force 8; Cửa Ông of Quảng Ninh province recorded winds reaching Beaufort force 6; peak gusts reaching Beaufort force 6 were also recorded in Móng Cái of Quảng Ninh province, Phù Liễn of Haiphong, Văn Lý of Ninh Bình province and Vũ Ninh of Hưng Yên province. Parts of Northern and Central Vietnam recorded rainfall from 40 mm (1.6 in) to 80 mm (3.1 in); in Quảng Ninh Province recorded higher than 100mm, such as Quất Đông with 253 mm (10.0 in). Some stations in North Central Coast recorded preciptaion precipitation of above 100 mm (3.9 in) such as Thanh Lâm and Xuân Lẹ in Thanh Hóa Province with 251 mm (9.9 in), Hủa Na Hydropower Plant (Nghệ An) with 207 mm (8.1 in). In Quảng Ninh province, 21 houses had their roofs blown off, 142 hectares of rice fields were flooded and some schools and roads were eroded. The remnants of Ragasa were attributed to a series of severe floods that affected Northern Vietnam in late September and early October, along with Typhoon Bualoi and Typhoon Matmo.

=== Elsewhere ===
Heavy rains was recorded in Laos and Cambodia by the typhoon in September 25 and 26. In Thailand, Ragasa triggerred heavy rainfall and caused flooding which affected 13,509 households across 62 districts, 153 subdistricts and 736 villages in 30 provinces from 23 to 25 September.

== Retirement ==
Because of the widespread destruction in multiple countries, the ESCAP/WMO Typhoon Committee retired the name Ragasa, along with seven others, from the rotating naming lists during its 58th Session despite being used for the first time. Its replacement name will be announced in 2027.

On March 19, 2026, PAGASA retired the name Nando from its rotating naming lists due to the damage and loss of life in the Philippines; and will never be used again as a typhoon name within the PAR. It will be replaced with Nilad, a species of shrub, for the 2029 season.

== See also ==
- Weather of 2025
- Tropical cyclones in 2025
- List of violent typhoons
- List of Philippine typhoons
- Typhoon Sally (Aring; 1964)
- Typhoon Sally (Maring; 1996)
- Typhoon Hagupit (Nina; 2008)
- Typhoon Usagi (Odette; 2013)
- Typhoon Saola (Goring; 2023)
