= Typhoon Bualoi =

Pacific typhoon in 2025

Typhoon Bualoi (Opong)
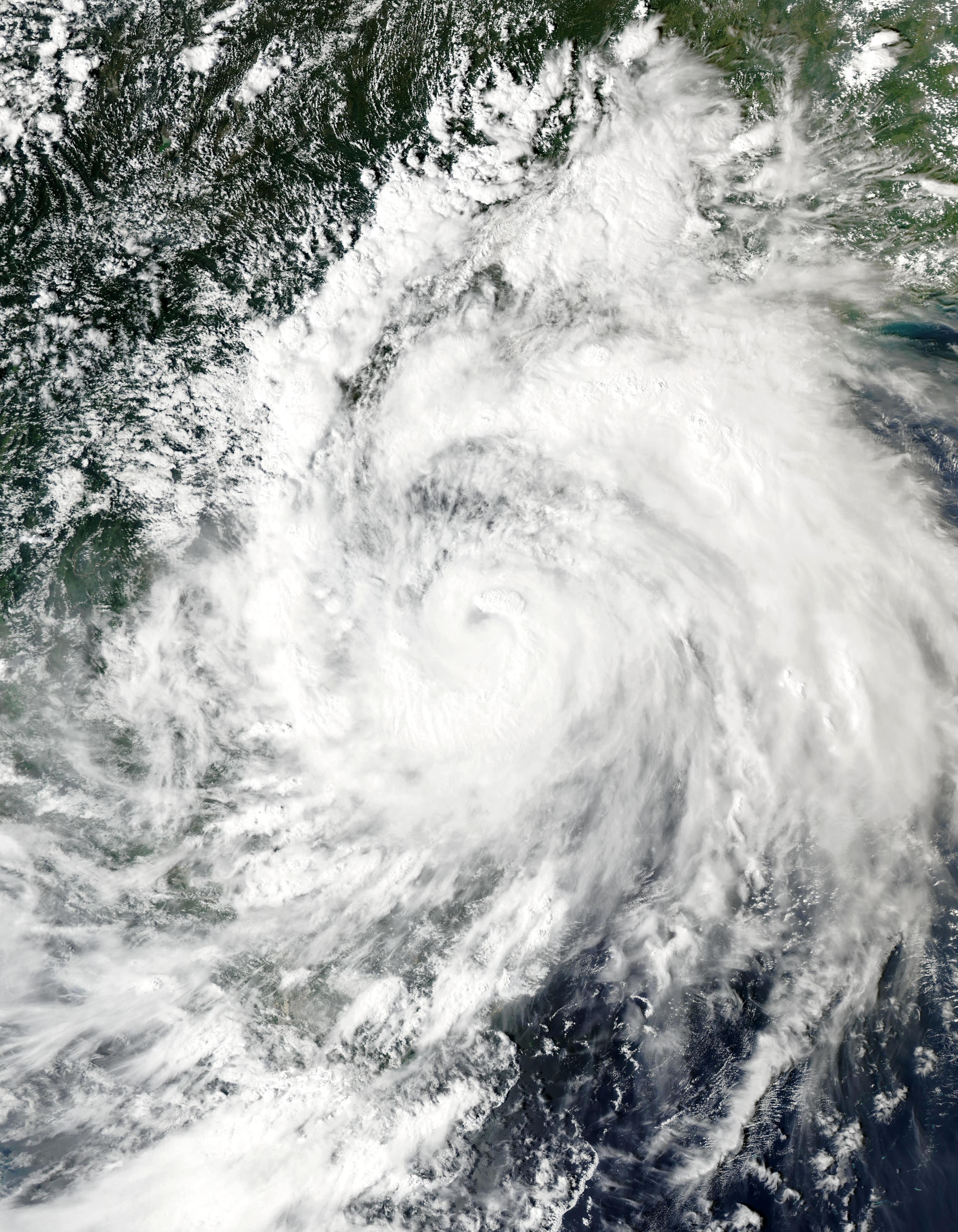
- Bualoi near peak intensity while approaching Vietnam on September 28

Meteorological history
- Formed: September 22, 2025
- Remnant low: September 29, 2025
- Dissipated: September 30, 2025

Typhoon
- 10-minute sustained (JMA)
- Highest winds: 120 km/h (75 mph)
- Lowest pressure: 975 hPa (mbar); 28.79 inHg

Category 2-equivalent typhoon
- 1-minute sustained (SSHWS/JTWC)
- Highest winds: 155 km/h (100 mph)
- Lowest pressure: 970 hPa (mbar); 28.64 inHg

Overall effects
- Fatalities: 94+
- Injuries: 214+
- Missing: 23+
- Damage: >$950 million (2025 USD) (Second-costliest in Vietnamese history)
- Areas affected: Federated States of Micronesia; particularly Yap; Philippines; particularly Masbate; Vietnam; particularly Northern Vietnam; Laos
- Part of the 2025 Pacific typhoon season

Typhoon Bualoi, (Note: The name Bualoi (Thai: บัวลอย, [bua˧ lɔːj˧]) was contributed by Thailand and refers to a Thai dessert in Thai.) known in the Philippines as Typhoon Opong and in Vietnam as Typhoon No. 10 of 2025 (Vietnamese: Bão số 10 năm 2025), was a strong and devastating tropical cyclone that caused significant damage and numerous fatalities across the central Philippines, particularly the regions of Bicol and Eastern Visayas, as well as Northern and Northern Central Vietnam, particularly Nghệ An and Hà Tĩnh in late September 2025. Bualoi is the twentieth named storm and the seventh typhoon of the 2025 Pacific typhoon season.

Bualoi originated from a disturbance north of Yap on September 22. The disturbance gradually organized into a tropical depression and was assigned the name Opong by the Philippine Atmospheric, Geophysical and Astronomical Services Administration (PAGASA). On September 23, the system was designated Tropical Depression 26W by the Joint Typhoon Warning Center (JTWC) and named Bualoi by the Japan Meteorological Agency (JMA). It strengthened into a tropical storm on September 24 and was later upgraded to a severe tropical storm as it moved west-southwest. Bualoi subsequently made six landfalls across Eastern Visayas and Mimaropa before reemerging through the Mindoro Strait, where it intensified into a Category 1-equivalent typhoon according to the JTWC. Bualoi gained more strength, reaching its peak intensity as a Category 2-equivalent typhoon before it made a final landfall over Hà Tĩnh on September 29. It later moved inland over Laos, where it rapidly weakened into a remnant low before it was reportedly dissipated on the following day.

Bualoi caused extensive damage in parts of the Philippines and Vietnam, leaving at least 94 people dead, 214 injured, and 23 others missing.

== Meteorological history ==
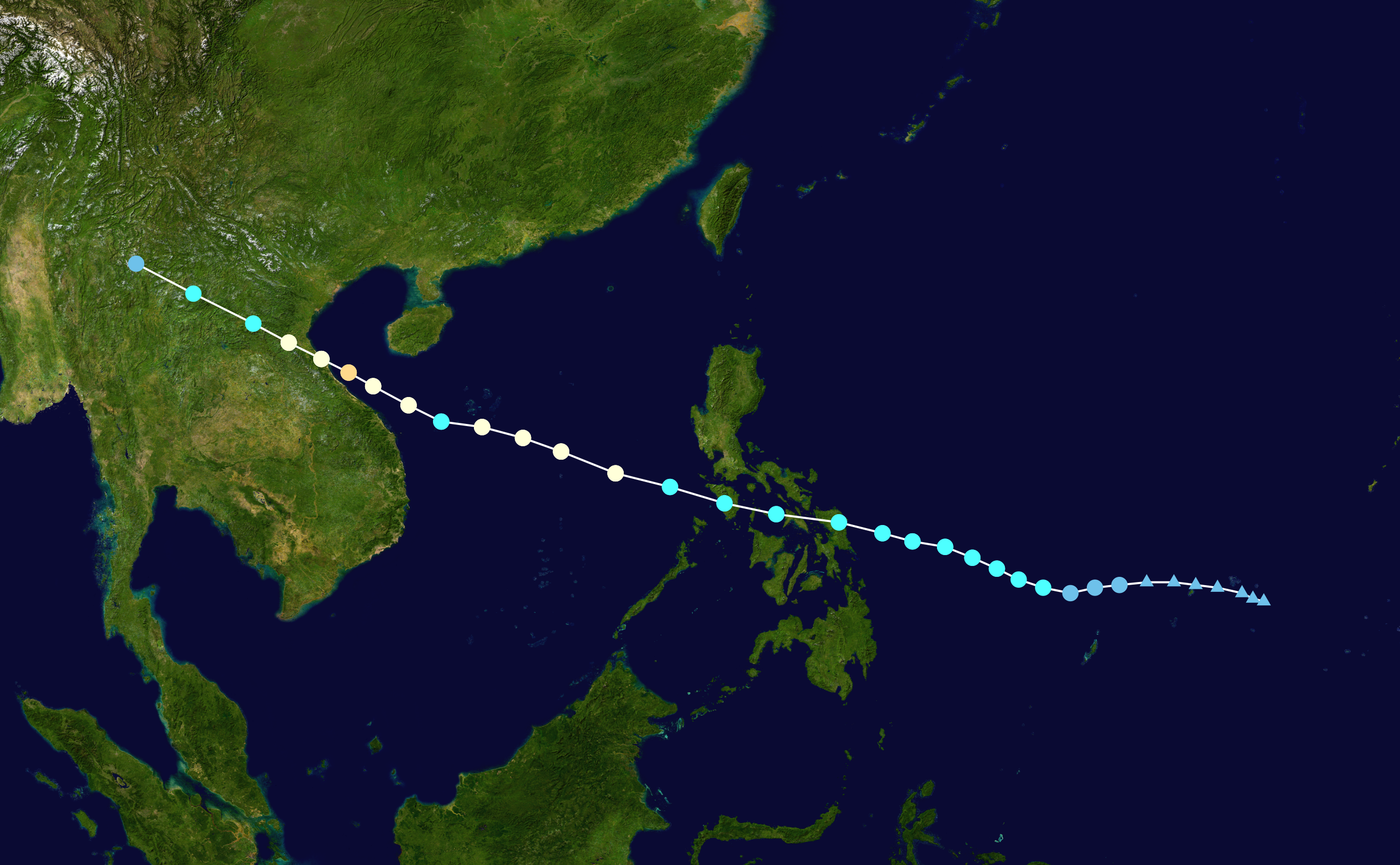
Map plotting the storm's track and intensity, according to the Saffir–Simpson scale Map key Saffir–Simpson scale Tropical depression (≤38 mph, ≤62 km/h) Tropical storm (39–73 mph, 63–118 km/h) Category 1 (74–95 mph, 119–153 km/h) Category 2 (96–110 mph, 154–177 km/h) Category 3 (111–129 mph, 178–208 km/h) Category 4 (130–156 mph, 209–251 km/h) Category 5 (≥157 mph, ≥252 km/h) Unknown Storm type Tropical cyclone Subtropical cyclone Extratropical cyclone, remnant low, tropical disturbance, or monsoon depression

A low-pressure area (LPA) developed north of Yap in the Federated States of Micronesia on September 22. It intensified into a tropical depression while tracking west-northwestward. At 00:00 UTC on September 23, the JMA assessed sustained winds of 30 knots (55 km/h). The disturbance later consolidated under favorable conditions, prompting the JTWC to issue a Tropical Cyclone Formation Alert at 02:00 UTC citing a high chance of development. By 16:00 PHT (08:00 UTC), it entered the Philippine Area of Responsibility (PAR) and was assigned the local name Opong by PAGASA. At 15:00 UTC, the JTWC designated the system as 26W, noting moderate poleward and equatorial outflow. The JMA subsequently named it Bualoi at 18:00 UTC as the system moved closer to the Philippines. At 03:00 UTC on September 24, the JTWC upgraded Bualoi into a tropical storm, citing increasingly organized deep convective banding over its northwestern and southern quadrants.

Later that day, both PAGASA and the JMA upgraded the system to a severe tropical storm, locating it along the southwestern periphery of a subtropical high. At 18:00 UTC, the JMA upgraded Bualoi to a typhoon with winds of 120 km/h (75 mph), supported by high sea surface temperatures and strong heat potential, while a central dense overcast (CDO) continued developing. Despite favorable conditions, dry air intrusion limited the storm's structure, preventing further strengthening. The JTWC noted an expansive CDO obscuring the eye and cloud tops. At 23:30 PHT (15:30 UTC), Bualoi made its first landfall on San Policarpo, Eastern Samar. PAGASA downgraded it to a severe tropical storm as it made second and third landfalls in Palanas and Milagros, Masbate, at 04:00 and 05:30 PHT (20:00 and 21:30 UTC the previous day), respectively. On the morning of September 26, Bualoi made its fourth and fifth landfalls in San Fernando and Alcantara, both in Romblon. At 11:30 PHT, it made a sixth landfall in Mansalay, Oriental Mindoro. After reemerging over the Mindoro Strait, the JTWC upgraded Bualoi to a minimal typhoon as it began rapid deepening. It then entered the South China Sea, where low vertical wind shear and ample deep moisture supported intensification. Satellite imagery showed a slightly asymmetric structure, with a wedge of dry air separating two zones of deep convection. Radar data indicated a ragged eye feature encircled by weak to moderate convection, with well-defined outer rainbands extending along the Vietnamese coastline. The storm then rapidly intensified into a Category 2-equivalent typhoon before making landfall in Hà Tĩnh, Vietnam, on September 29 while moving west-northwestward. The lowest sea-level pressure dropped below 980 hPa at several weather stations, including Hương Sơn station (Hà Tĩnh province): 979.3 hPa; Hà Tĩnh station (Hà Tĩnh province): 976.4 hPa; Hoành Sơn station (Hà Tĩnh province): 975.5 hPa; Kỳ Anh station (Hà Tĩnh province): 976.3 hPa; Ba Đồn station (Quảng Trị province): 978.7 hPa. The JTWC issued its final warning later that day as Bualoi moved inland over Laos, while the Hong Kong Observatory (HKO) last noted Bualoi at 02:00 HKT (18:00 UTC) on September 30 when it was 220 nautical miles (410 km) north-northwest of Vientiane before declaring it dissipated.

== Preparations ==
=== Philippines ===
==== Highest Tropical Cyclone Wind Signal ====
Highest Tropical Cyclone Wind Signal issued by PAGASA for Bualoi (Opong) in each province. The white line represents the best track.

TCWS#	Luzon	Visayas	Mindanao
4	Northern Portion of Masbate, Sorsogon, Ticao Island	Northern and Central Portions of Eastern Samar, Northern and Central Portions of Samar, Northern Samar	None
3	Batangas, Southern Portion of Laguna, Southern Portion of Quezon, Calamian Islands, Lubang Islands, Marinduque, Occidental Mindoro, Oriental Mindoro, Romblon, Albay, Rest of Masbate, Southern Portion of Camarines Sur, Burias Island	Northern Portion of Aklan, Northern Portion of Capiz, Biliran, Extreme Northern Portion of Leyte, Rest of Eastern Samar, Rest of Samar	None
2	Bataan, Bulacan, Pampanga, Southern Portion of Zambales, Metro Manila, Cavite, Polillo Islands, Cuyo Islands, Rest of Laguna, Rizal, Calaguas Islands, Camarines Norte, Catanduanes, Rest of Camarines Sur	Caluya Islands, Northern and Central Portions of Antique, Northern Portion of Iloilo, Rest of Aklan, Rest of Capiz, Extreme Northern Portion of Negros Occidental, Bantayan Islands, Northern Portion of Cebu, Northern and Central Portions of Leyte, Eastern Portion of Southern Leyte, Rest of Eastern Samar, Rest of Samar	Bucas Grande Island, Dinagat Island, Siargao Island
1	La Union, Pangasinan, Southern Portion of Ilocos Sur, Central and Southern Portions of Isabela, Nueva Vizcaya, Quirino, Aurora, Nueva Ecija, Rest of Zambales, Tarlac, Benguet, Ifugao, Southwestern Portion of Mountain Province, Northern Portion of Palawan	Guimaras, Rest of Antique, Rest of Iloilo, Northern Portion of Negros Occidental, Northern Portion of Negros Oriental, Central Portion of Cebu, Eastern and Central Portions of Bohol, Camotes Islands, Rest of Leyte, Rest of Southern Leyte	Surigao del Norte

On September 24, at their 11:00 PHT (03:00 UTC) bulletin, PAGASA issued Tropical Cyclone Wind Signal No. 1 over the entire provinces of Northern Samar, Eastern Samar, and Samar. PAGASA stated that there was a potential risk of coastal flooding due to storm surge in low-lying coastal areas of Southern Luzon and Eastern Visayas. Around 17:00 PHT (09:00 UTC), the agency upgraded their signals and raised Signal No. 2 in Northern Samar and northern Eastern Samar as the storm intensified into a severe tropical storm. Signal No. 1 was also hoisted over Albay, Biliran, Camarines Sur, Catanduanes, Masbate, Sorsogon, northern Leyte, as well as Burias Island and Ticao Island. By 23:00 PHT (15:00 UTC), Signal No. 1 was further extended to cover Camarines Norte, Laguna, Marinduque, Oriental Mindoro, Quezon, the Polillo Islands, Rizal, Romblon, and southeastern Batangas.

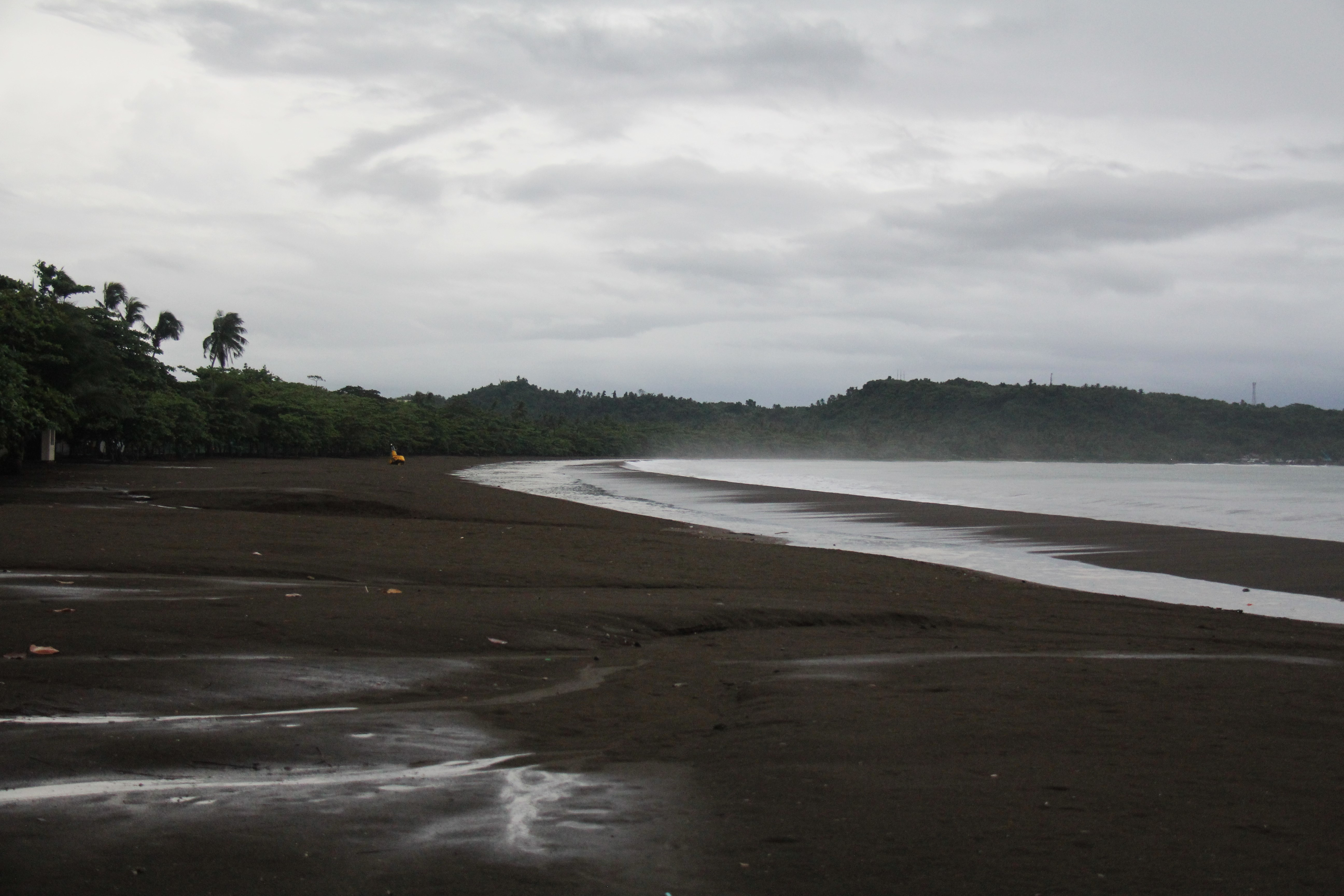
Baybay Boulevard experiencing a major storm surge during the onslaught of Bualoi in Eastern Samar.

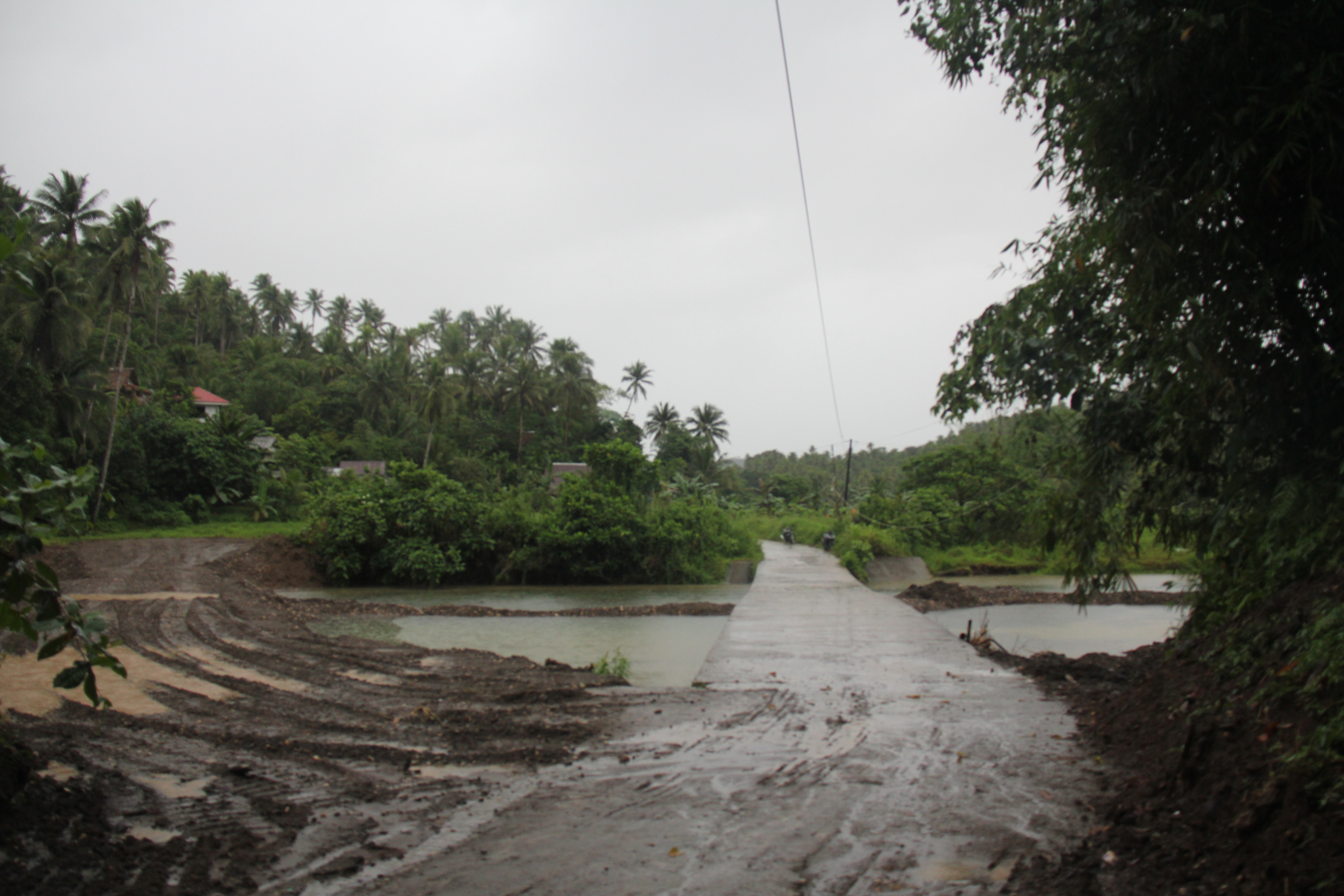
A bridge in Siha flooded by a river during the onslaught of Bualoi in Eastern Samar.

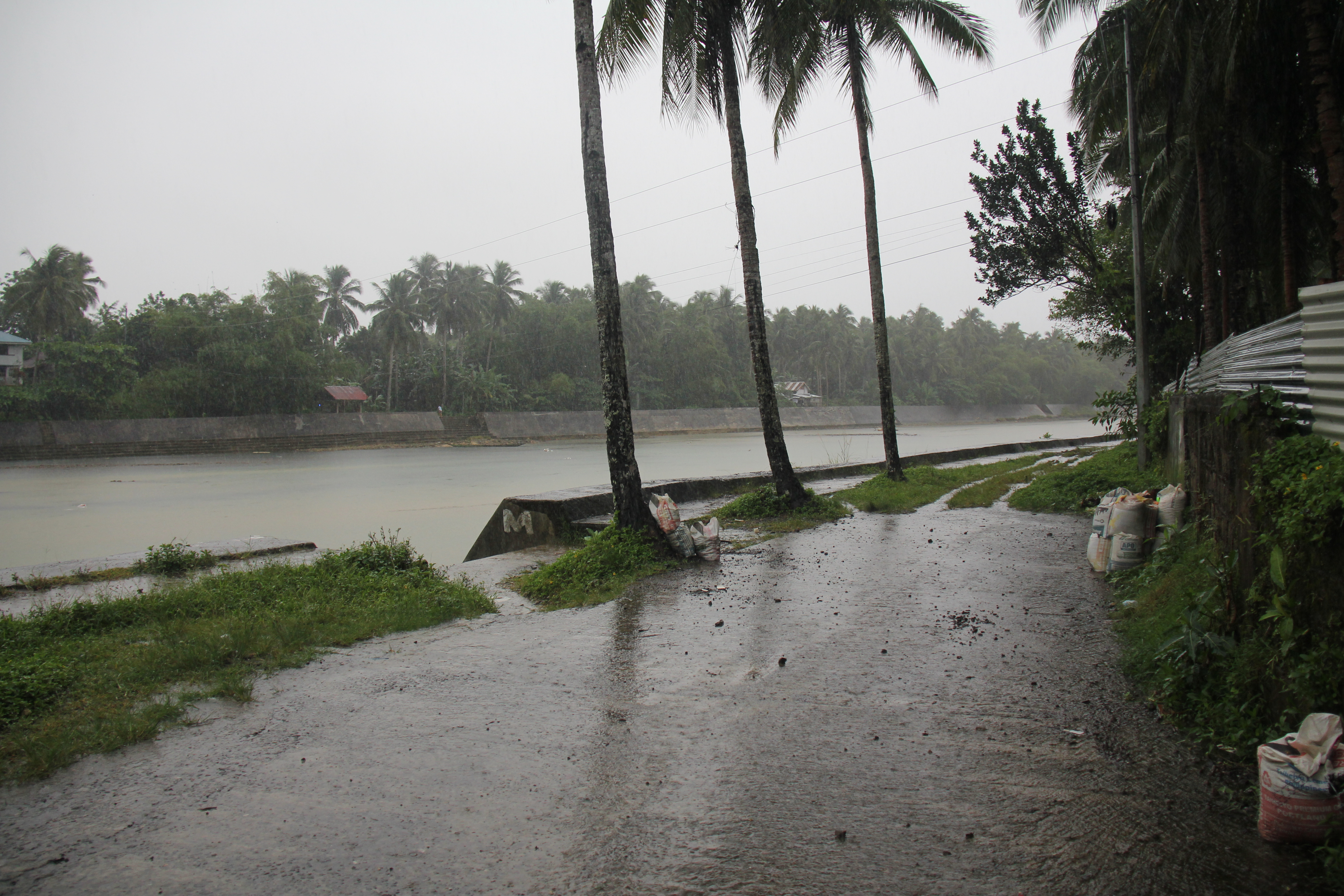
The Calingatngan River at high level during the onslaught of Bualoi in Eastern Samar.

The following day at 05:00 PHT (21:00 UTC on September 24), Signal No. 2 was extended across southern Albay, all of Catanduanes and Sorsogon, central Eastern Samar, and northern to central Samar. Signal No. 1 was also raised over Aklan, Aurora, Bataan, Batangas, Benguet, Bucas Grande Island, Bulacan, Capiz, Cavite, Dinagat Island, Ifugao, La Union, Leyte, Metro Manila, Nueva Ecija, Nueva Vizcaya, Occidental Mindoro, the Lubang Islands, Pampanga, Pangasinan, Quirino, Siargao Island, Southern Leyte, Tarlac, and Zambales. This also included northern and central Antique, the Calamian Islands, the Caluya Islands, northern Cebu, Camotes Island, Bantayan Island, southern Ilocos Sur, northern Iloilo, central and southern Isabela, southwestern Mountain Province, and northern Negros Occidental. At 12:00 PHT (04:00 UTC), Signal No. 3 was hoisted in northern and eastern Northern Samar, affecting eight municipalities, and in northern Eastern Samar, affecting four municipalities. Three hours later, Sorsogon and northern Masbate were also placed under Signal No. 3. By 02:00 PHT on September 26 (18:00 UTC on September 25), Signal No. 4 was issued in several municipalities in Eastern Samar, Masbate, and Samar, while all of Sorsogon and Northern Samar were also placed under Signal No. 4. Signal No. 4 was cancelled shortly after. All signals were lifted after Bualoi exited the PAR on September 27.

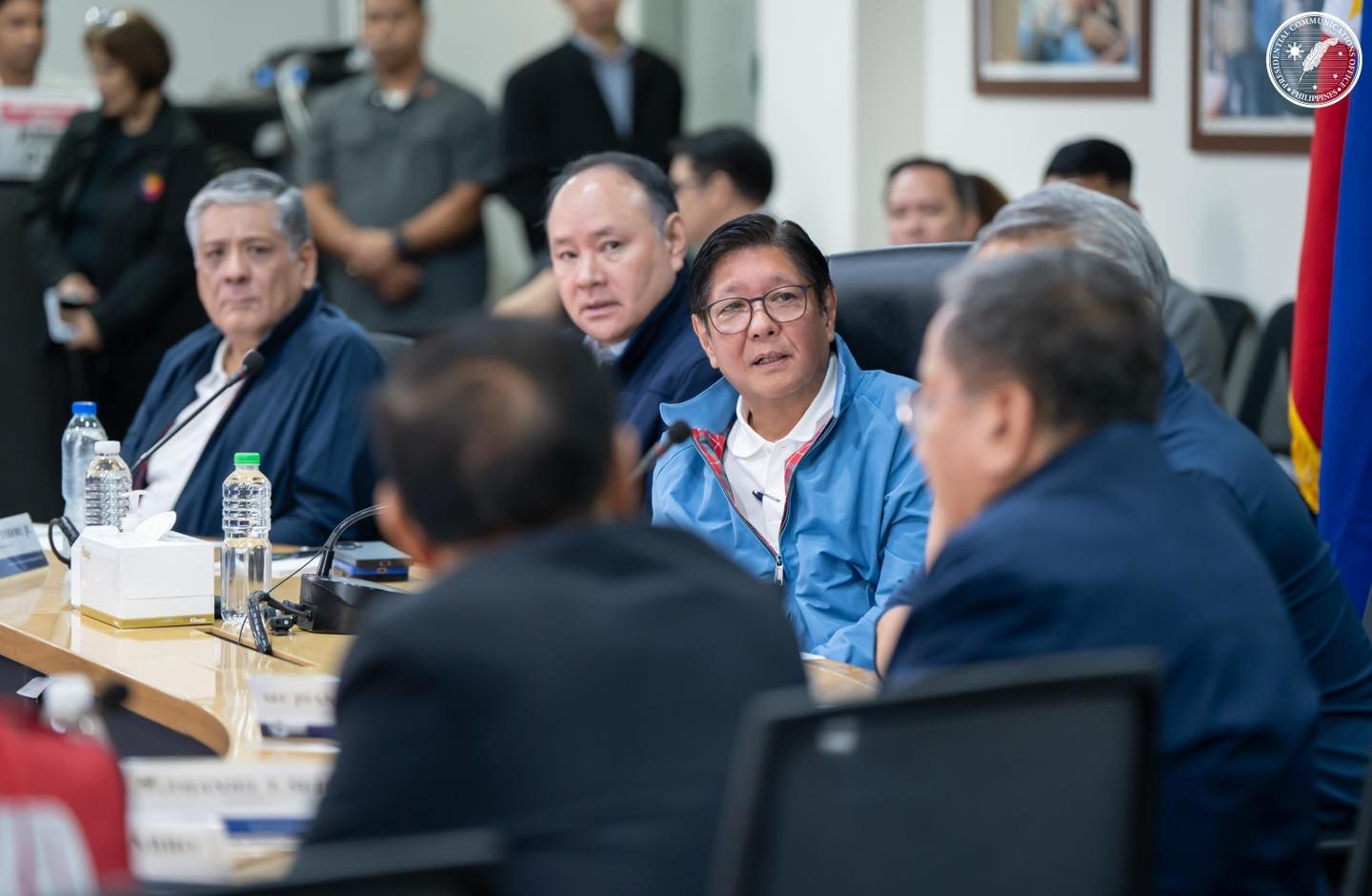
Marcos directing the NDRRMC and concerned agencies to maximize government resources in preparation for Bualoi

A total of 1,500 passengers were stranded in 42 ports nationwide, along with 14 vessels and 780 rolling cargoes. President Bongbong Marcos instructed agencies to maximize resources for Opong during a meeting at the National Disaster Risk Reduction and Management Council (NDRRMC). A memorandum signed by Executive Secretary Lucas Bersamin suspended all classes and work in Sorsogon, Masbate, Northern Samar, and Eastern Samar. Class suspensions were later issued for the rest of the areas in Bicol Region, Metro Manila, and some areas in Calabarzon, Southern Tagalog Region, and Eastern Visayas on the following day, September 26. The Calabarzon Regional Disaster Risk Reduction and Management Council raised its alert status to red, while the Metro Manila Disaster Risk Reduction and Management Council was also placed under red alert, directing all response teams to heighten preparedness. In Oriental Mindoro, local authorities ramped up preparation efforts, while the Eastern Visayas Disaster Risk Reduction and Management Council organized a special task group in anticipation of the storm. Churches under the Diocese of Legazpi opened their doors as temporary shelters. Many flights were suspended, and the Department of Agriculture urged farmers to take protective measures for their crops.

=== China ===
The red warning signal was issued in Sanya, Hainan province.

=== Vietnam ===
On September 24, the National Civil Defense Steering Committee (Note: Vietnamese: Ban Chỉ đạo Phòng thủ Dân sự quốc gia) issued Document No. 04/BCĐ-BNNMT to the People's Committees of coastal provinces and cities from Quảng Ninh to An Giang, regarding proactive measures for Bualoi. (Note: Bualoi is known as "bão số mười" or "bão số 10" in Vietnamese.) The directive instructed provinces and cities to promptly inform captains and vessel owners at ports or operating at sea, urging them to take precautionary measures and adjust production plans to ensure the safety of people and property. It also required the maintenance of communication systems to handle emergencies quickly, as well as the readiness of forces and resources to conduct rescue and relief operations if necessary. Localities were further ordered to maintain strict monitoring and to report regularly to the Committee under the Ministry of Agriculture and Environment.

== Impact ==
=== Philippines ===
At least 37 deaths and 13 missing persons were attributed to Bualoi. Together with the southwest monsoon and previous storms including Typhoon Ragasa (Nando) and Severe Tropical Storm Mitag (Mirasol), the system left 708 homes destroyed, 4,494 damaged, and caused damage to 243 road sections and 46 bridges. Nationwide, around 400,000 people were evacuated. The Department of Education reported that 891 classrooms sustained minor damage, 225 sustained major damage, and 254 were destroyed; 121 schools were used as evacuation centers. Eighteen fatalities occurred in Masbate, where 14,767 houses were destroyed and 55,541 partially damaged, while 148 schools were destroyed and 286 damaged. The province recorded up to ₱70 million (US$1.2 million) in irrigation facilities. School facilities in Masbate suffered extensive damage, with the loss reached ₱4.7 billion (US$80.7 million). Parts of Southern Luzon also reported power outages and damage to crops and infrastructure. In Northern Samar, 1,475 houses were destroyed. Ten deaths were reported in Biliran due to flash flooding and storm surges, while five fishermen went missing in Eastern Samar.

Additional damage included a church ceiling collapse in Batuan, Masbate, which injured several evacuees sheltering inside. Thirty-nine people were injured in Oriental Mindoro, where more than half the province, equivalent to 265,765 households, lost electricity after 200 electric poles were toppled. Damages there were estimated at ₱16 million (US$275,000), with agricultural losses of ₱900 million (US$15.5 million) and infrastructure damage of ₱145 million (US$2.49 million). The roof of the Oriental Mindoro Sports Complex in Naujan was also blown off.

One death and three injuries were also reported in Occidental Mindoro, with agricultural damage at ₱237 million (US$4.07 million). Flooding and landslides blocked roads and destroyed a dike in Antique. In Western Visayas, damage totaled ₱45.4 million (US$780,000) for infrastructure and agriculture. Moises R. Espinosa Airport in Masbate City sustained severe damage worth at least ₱10 million (US$172,000). In Eastern Samar, the section of the Wright–Taft Road in Taft was deemed impassable. The municipality of Pinabacdao, Samar experienced a power interruption on September 24 before eventually got restored two days later. In Northern Samar, the municipalities of Mondragon and Silvino Lobos also experienced power blackouts. In San Agustin, Romblon, one lasted over 24 hours. The entire province of Masbate also experienced a blackout. Six vessels ran aground in Oriental Mindoro, Occidental Mindoro, and Romblon. A dike collapsed due to heavy rains in Guimbal, Iloilo, while in Romblon, 14,138 houses were damaged and 1,786 destroyed, with total damage valued at ₱220 million (US$3.78 million); agricultural losses reached ₱60 million (US$1.03 million). A state of calamity was declared in Romblon, Oriental Mindoro, Masbate, the province most affected by the typhoon in the Bicol Region as per NDRRMC, the city of Calbayog in Samar, and the municipality of Ibajay in Aklan.

Combined with Mitag and Ragasa, total damage in the Philippines reached ₱5 billion (US$101.52 million).

=== Vietnam ===
Costliest tropical cyclones in Vietnam
Rank	Storm	Season	Damage		Ref.
Rank	Storm	Season	VND	USD	Ref.
1	Yagi	2024	84.5 trillion	$3.47 billion	
2	Bualoi	2025	23.9 trillion	$950 million	
3	Damrey	2017	22.7 trillion	$1 billion	
4	Matmo	2025	21 trillion	$837 million	
5	Doksuri	2017	18.4 trillion	$809 million	
6	Ketsana	2009	16.1 trillion	$896 million	
7	Wutip	2013	13.6 trillion	$648 million	
8	Molave	2020	13.3 trillion	$573 million	
9	TD 23W	2017	13.1 trillion	$579 million	
10	Kalmaegi	2025	13.1 trillion	$521 million	

In the early morning of September 29, Bualoi made landfall in Nghệ An and Hà Tĩnh. Several stations in Vietnam recorded maximum 2-minute sustained wind speeds exceeding 100 km/h during Typhoon Bualoi:

- Văn Lý station (Ninh Bình province) measured a maximum sustained wind speed of 101 km/h (63 mph) and a maximum wind gust of 115 km/h (72 mph).
- Diễn Châu station (Nghệ An province) measured a maximum sustained wind speed of 109 km/h (68 mph) and a maximum wind gust of 143 km/h (89 mph)
- Hòn Ngư Island [vi] station (Nghệ An province), located at an elevation of 133 m above sea level, measured a maximum sustained wind speed of 122 km/h (76 mph) and a maximum wind gust of 151 km/h (94 mph).
- Hoành Sơn station (Hà Tĩnh province) measured a maximum sustained wind speed of 115 km/h (72 mph) and a maximum wind gust of 158 km/h (98 mph).

As for rainfall caused by the typhoon's impact, from 19:00 on September 25 to 07:00 on October 2 (local time), many stations recorded rainfall exceeding 600mm, including: Tà Si Láng (Lào Cai): 685mm, Xuân Bình (Thanh Hóa): 836mm, Cẩm Liên 2 (Thanh Hóa): 811mm, Mỹ Sơn 1 (Nghệ An): 651mm, Hủa Na (Nghệ An): 659mm, Sơn Hồng 1 (Hà Tĩnh): 609mm, Đức Hóa (Quảng Trị): 593mm, Bạch Mã (Huế): 857mm, Quan Tượng Đài (Huế): 695mm. The peak flood flow rate at the Tuyên Quang Reservoir was 6985 m^{3}/s.

Video of a tornado in Ninh Bình province after Bualoi brushed the country.

In Hà Tĩnh, the storm raged for many hours from the night of September 28 into the early morning of September 29. Coastal areas including Kỳ Anh, Cẩm Xuyên, and Nghi Xuân reported collapsed houses, blown-off roofs, and toppled power poles. Many households that had only just recovered from earlier Typhoon Kajiki suffered additional losses. In Vinh and the coastal districts of Cửa Lò, Nghi Lộc, Diễn Châu, and Quỳnh Lưu, strong winds uprooted trees and knocked down power lines, damaging roads and public infrastructure; hundreds of houses lost roofs. In Ninh Bình province, nine people were killed by a tornado spawned by the typhoon. Another tornado in Hưng Yên province killed two and injured nine, and a third tornado in Haiphong injured eight people. Around 347,000 households lost electricity nationwide. Strong winds by the typhoon caused 17 incidents on the national 500 kV line, 24 incidents on the 220 kV line, and 119 incidents on the 110 kV line.

Heavy floods affected localities in Hà Tĩnh, Nghệ An, Thanh Hóa, Hà Nội Phú Thọ, Yên Bái, and Lào Cai. Record floodings were reported in Hà Giang and Cao Bằng. Seven people were reported missing in landslides in Lũng Cú, Đức Long (Hòa An), Sa Pa and Nậm Xé (Văn Bàn). In Quảng Trị, two died and seven went missing after a fishing boat capsized.

In total, 57 people were killed, 10 others were reported missing, and 172 were injured by Typhoon Bualoi in Vietnam. Around 200 houses were destroyed, while more than 169,000 houses were damaged and 64,800 homes submerged. More than 80,600 ha (199,000 acres) of crops, more than 21,000 livestock and nearly 500,000 poultry were lost. Over 7,500 roads were rendered impassable by flooding and landslides. As of November 25, damages were valued at nearly 23.898 trillion dong (US$950 million), including 6 trillion đồng (US$227 million) in Hà Tĩnh province and 3 trillion đồng (US$114 million) in Tuyên Quang province.

=== China ===
Twenty tornadoes were confirmed in Southern China, specifically the Zhanjiang area, between September 28 and 29. Most were rated EF0 or EF1, although one was rated EF2.

== Retirement ==
Due to the devastation it caused in the Philippines and Vietnam, the ESCAP/WMO Typhoon Committee has retired the name Bualoi, along with seven others, from rotating storm name lists during its 58th Session, and it will not be used again for another typhoon name. Its replacement name will be announced in 2027.

On March 19, 2026, PAGASA retired the name Opong from its rotating naming lists due to the damage and extensive loss of life it caused, and it will not be used again as a typhoon name within the PAR despite its first usage. It will be replaced with Omar for the 2029 season.

== See also ==
- Weather of 2025
- Tropical cyclones in 2025
- Typhoon Vera (Bebeng; 1983) – another typhoon of similar strength and track which caused severe damages in the Philippines, China, and Vietnam.
- Typhoon Dan (Saling; 1989) – a typhoon of similar strength and track which also caused widespread damage in the Philippines and Vietnam
- Typhoon Ketsana (Ondoy; 2009) – a typhoon that had a similar track and intensity which devastated the same areas at the same time of year 16 years prior to Bualoi
- Typhoon Haiyan (Yolanda; 2013) – an even deadlier and stronger typhoon which took a nearly similar track across the Visayas, resulting in widespread devastation.
- Typhoon Melor (Nona; 2015) – another typhoon which took a similar trajectory also affected damage in the Bicol Region.
- Typhoon Nock-ten (Nina; 2016) – a powerful typhoon which also had a similar path while crossed some areas at southern Luzon in December 2016.
