= Philippine Veterans Affairs Office =

Government agency of the Philippines

Agency overview
- Formed: October 18, 1946
- Jurisdiction: Republic of the Philippines
- Headquarters: Camp Aguinaldo, Quezon City
- Employees: 312 (2024)
- Annual budget: ₱615.646 million (FY 2023 GAA)
- Agency executive: USec. Reynaldo B. Mapagu, Administrator
- Parent department: Department of National Defense
- Website: pvao.gov.ph

The Philippine Veterans Affairs Office (PVAO; Filipino: Tanggapan ng Ugnayang Pambeterano ng Pilipinas) is the Philippine agency for Filipino war veterans. Under the Department of National Defense, PVAO serves to fulfill a national commitment as embodied in Section 7, Article XVI of the 1987 Philippine Constitution:

“The State shall provide immediate and adequate care, benefits and other forms of assistance to war veterans and veterans of military campaigns, their surviving spouses and orphans. Funds shall be provided therefor and due consideration shall be given them in the disposition of agricultural lands of the public domain and, in appropriate cases, in the utilization of natural resources.”

PVAO's core functions include the administration of veteran’s pension and benefits, memorialization of veterans’ heroic deeds, and promotion of policies and management of services for veterans’ affairs and welfare.

== Veterans Memorial Medical Center ==
The Veterans Memorial Medical Center provides hospitalization, medical care and treatment to veterans and their dependents.

== National Military Shrines ==
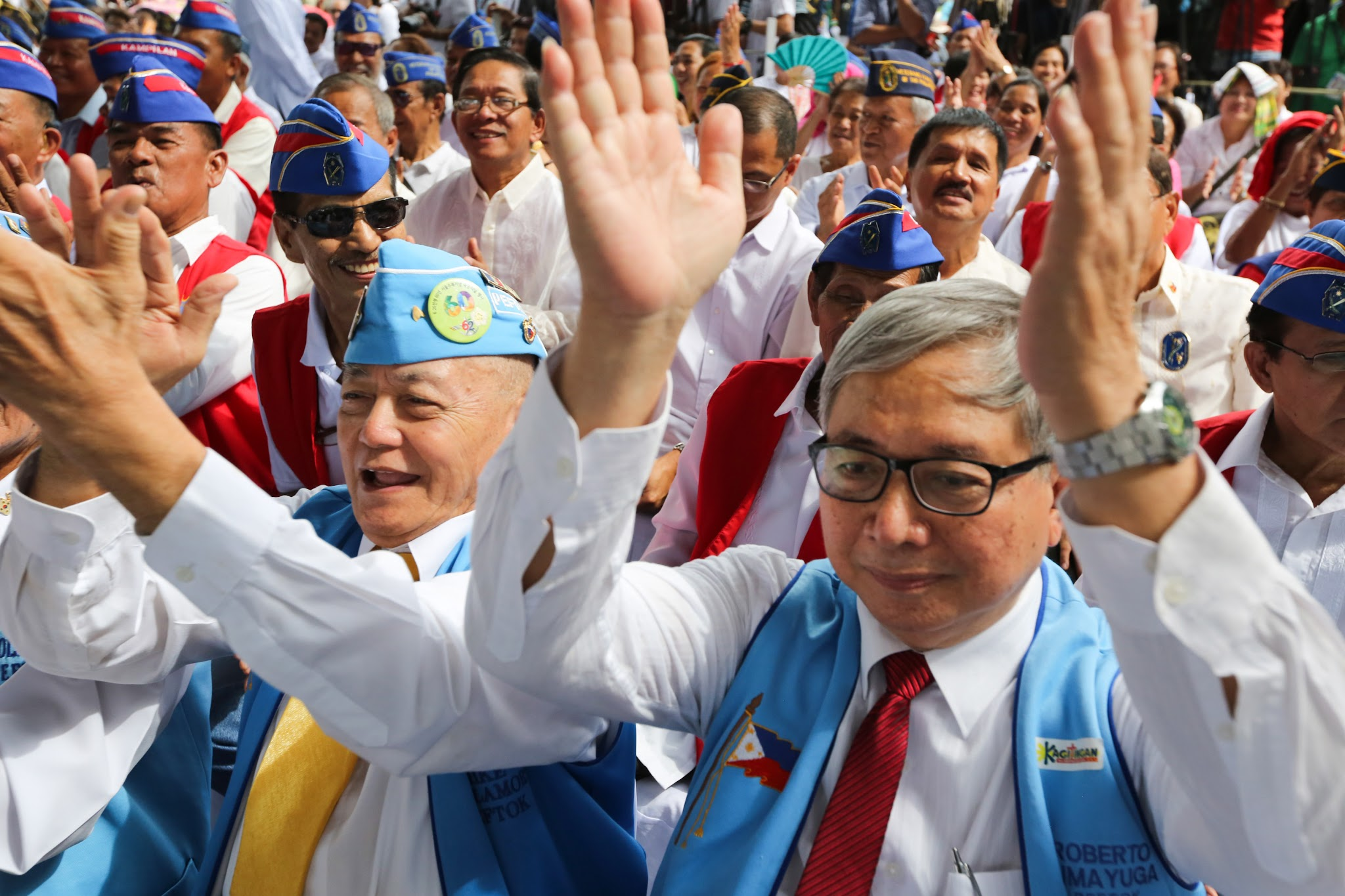
Filipino war veterans during the 2016 celebration of National Heroes' Day

The former Military Shrines Service which is responsible for the administration, maintenance and development of national shrines of military and historic significance, has been renamed as Veterans Memorial and Historical Division (VMHD) and is now a division under PVAO. From six national shrines, it now administers a total of ten military shrines, namely:

1. Balantang Memorial Cemetery National Shrine
2. Ricarte National Shrine
3. Capas National Shrine
4. Mount Samat National Shrine
5. Bantayog Sa Kiangan
6. Libingan ng mga Bayani
7. USAFIP-NL National Shrine & Park
8. PEFTOK-Korean War Memorial Hall
9. Corregidor National Shrine (under lease by the Department of Tourism)
10. Balete Pass National Shrine

== See also ==
- Department of National Defense
- Philippine Veterans Bank
