= Department of National Defense (Philippines) =

Executive department of the Philippine government

- Kagawaran ng Tanggulang Pambansa
- Official Seal of the Department of National Defense

- Department of National Defense Building in Camp Aguinaldo

Department overview
- Formed: November 1, 1939; 86 years ago
- Preceding Department: Created under National Defense Act (Commonwealth Act № 1) of December 31, 1935
- Jurisdiction: Government of the Philippines
- Headquarters: Camp General Emilio Aguinaldo, Quezon City; 14°36′38″N 121°03′53″E
- Employees: 257 (2024)
- Annual budget: ₱295.18 billion (2026) ▲
- Department executives: Gilberto C. Teodoro Jr., Secretary of National Defense; Irineo C. Espino, Undersecretary of National Defense; Pablo M. Lorenzo, Undersecretary for Civil, Veteran, and Reserve Affairs; Ignacio B. Madriaga, Undersecretary for Strategic Assessment and Planning; Angelito B. De Leon, Undersecretary for Defense Affairs; Salvador Melchor B. Mison Jr., Undersecretary for Acquisition and Resource Management; Ferdinand B. Cui Jr., Undersecretary for Special Concerns; Rene S. Diaz, Undersecretary for Defense Technology Research and Industry Development
- Child agencies: Government Arsenal; National Defense College of the Philippines; Office of Civil Defense; Philippine Veterans Affairs Office; Armed Forces of the Philippines
- Website: www.dnd.gov.ph

The Department of National Defense (DND; Filipino: Kagawaran ng Tanggulang Pambansa) is the executive department of the Philippine government responsible for guarding against external and internal threats to peace and security in the country. The Department of National Defense exercises executive supervision over the Armed Forces of the Philippines (AFP), the Office of Civil Defense (OCD), the Philippine Veterans Affairs Office (PVAO), the National Defense College of the Philippines (NDCP), the Government Arsenal (GA), and Veterans Memorial Medical Center (VMMC). It is also responsible for disaster preparation and management in the country.

It is headed by the secretary of national defense, who is a member of the president's cabinet.

== History ==
The Department of National Defense or DND was formally organised on November 1, 1939, pursuant to Executive Order No. 230 of President Manuel L. Quezon to implement Commonwealth Act No. 1 or the National Defense Act of 1935 passed by the National Assembly on December 31, 1935, and Commonwealth Act No. 340 creating the department.

Throughout its existence, the department's functions are to enforce the law and to curb criminality and to guarantee the external and internal security of the country. As such, the DND deals also with criminal elements because the Philippine Constabulary or PC, then a major branch of the Armed Forces that has responsibility in enforcing the law and maintaining peace and order was under its supervision, aside from other AFP major services (Army, Navy, Air Force) which are busy dealing with fighting insurgents like the Communists and Muslim secessionists.

During Martial Law, the Ministry of National Defense (MND) became the most powerful ministry in the executive branch under the leadership of then Defense Minister Juan Ponce Enrile, who was then named martial law overseer by then President Ferdinand Marcos, the military commander-in-chief. Also during Martial Law, Marcos, who assumed dictatorial powers issued a decree creating the National Intelligence and Security Authority or NISA, to be the country's national intelligence agency with broad powers over intelligence and national security. In effect, NISA also served as the secret police force of Marcos, and now became the most powerful agency, and the MND's status dwindled. The NISA was headed by General Fabian Ver, Marcos' most trusted man, who was also at that time, the commander of the then Presidential Security Command and later, was named to be the concurrent staff of the Armed Forces, thus becoming the most powerful military officer.

At the end of Marcos regime on 1986, the DND continued to exercise the powers to deal with criminality and internal plus external defense of the country until 1991 when then President Corazon Aquino signed Republic Act No. 6975 passing the functions to enforce all criminal laws from DND to the Department of the Interior and Local Government or DILG. Both departments, however, shared the responsibility of guaranteeing internal security.

== Organizational structure ==
The department is headed by the Secretary of National Defense, with the following five undersecretaries and assistant secretaries.

- Undersecretary for National Defense/Senior Undersecretary
- Undersecretary for Acquisition and Resource Management
- Undersecretary for Civil, Veterans and Reserve Affairs
- Undersecretary for Strategic Assessment and Planning
- Undersecretary for Capability Assessment and Development
- Assistant Secretary for Plans and Programs
- Assistant Secretary for Human Resource
- Assistant Secretary for Strategic Assessment and International Affairs
- Assistant Secretary for Financial Management
- Assistant Secretary for Logistics, Acquisitions and Self-Reliant Defense Posture
- Assistant Secretary for Real Estate and Installations

== Attached agencies ==
- Government Arsenal
- National Defense College of the Philippines
- National Security Council
- Office of Civil Defense
- Philippine Aerospace Development Corporation
- Philippine Veterans Affairs Office
- Armed Forces of the Philippines
- Veterans Memorial Medical Center
- Presidential Security Group
- Philippine Military Academy
- National Disaster Risk Reduction and Management Council
- Vice Presidential Security and Protection Group

== Statistics ==
=== Budget ===
View source data.
