= Văn Bàn =

- Commune
- Interactive map of Văn Bàn
- Coordinates: 22.09777996985084°N 104.35913243859066°E
- Country: Vietnam
- Province: Lào Cai
- Region: Northwest
- Established: 2025
- Seat: Thôn Văn Tiến

Area
  - Total: 156.74 km^{2} (60.52 sq mi)

Population (2025)
  - Total: 23,943
  - Density: 152/km^{2} (390/sq mi)

Văn Bàn is a commune in Lào Cai province, Vietnam.

== History ==
On 16 June 2025, the Standing Committee of the National Assembly of Vietnam issued Resolution No. 1673/NQ-UBTVQH15 on the reorganization of commune-level administrative units in Lào Cai province in 2025. Under the resolution, the entire area and population of Khánh Yên township and the former communes of Khánh Yên Thượng, Sơn Thuỷ, Làng Giàng, and Hòa Mạc in Văn Bàn district were consolidated to form a new commune named Văn Bàn.
