= Hong Kong rainstorm warning signals =

Hong Kong signals used to alert the public about heavy rain

- Traditional Chinese: 暴雨警告信號
- Simplified Chinese: 暴雨警告信号
Transcriptions
Standard Mandarin
- Hanyu Pinyin: Bàoyǔ jǐnggào xìnhào
Yue: Cantonese
- Yale Romanization: Bouh yúh gíng gou seun houh
- Jyutping: Bou6 jyu5 ging2 gou3 soen3 hou6

The rainstorm warning signals are a set of signals used in Hong Kong to inform the public of heavy rainfall that is likely to cause major disruptions, such as traffic congestion and flooding. These warnings also help ensure that essential services are prepared to respond to potential emergencies. The Hong Kong Observatory is responsible for issuing these signals, which are broadcast on radio and television.

== The three-level system ==
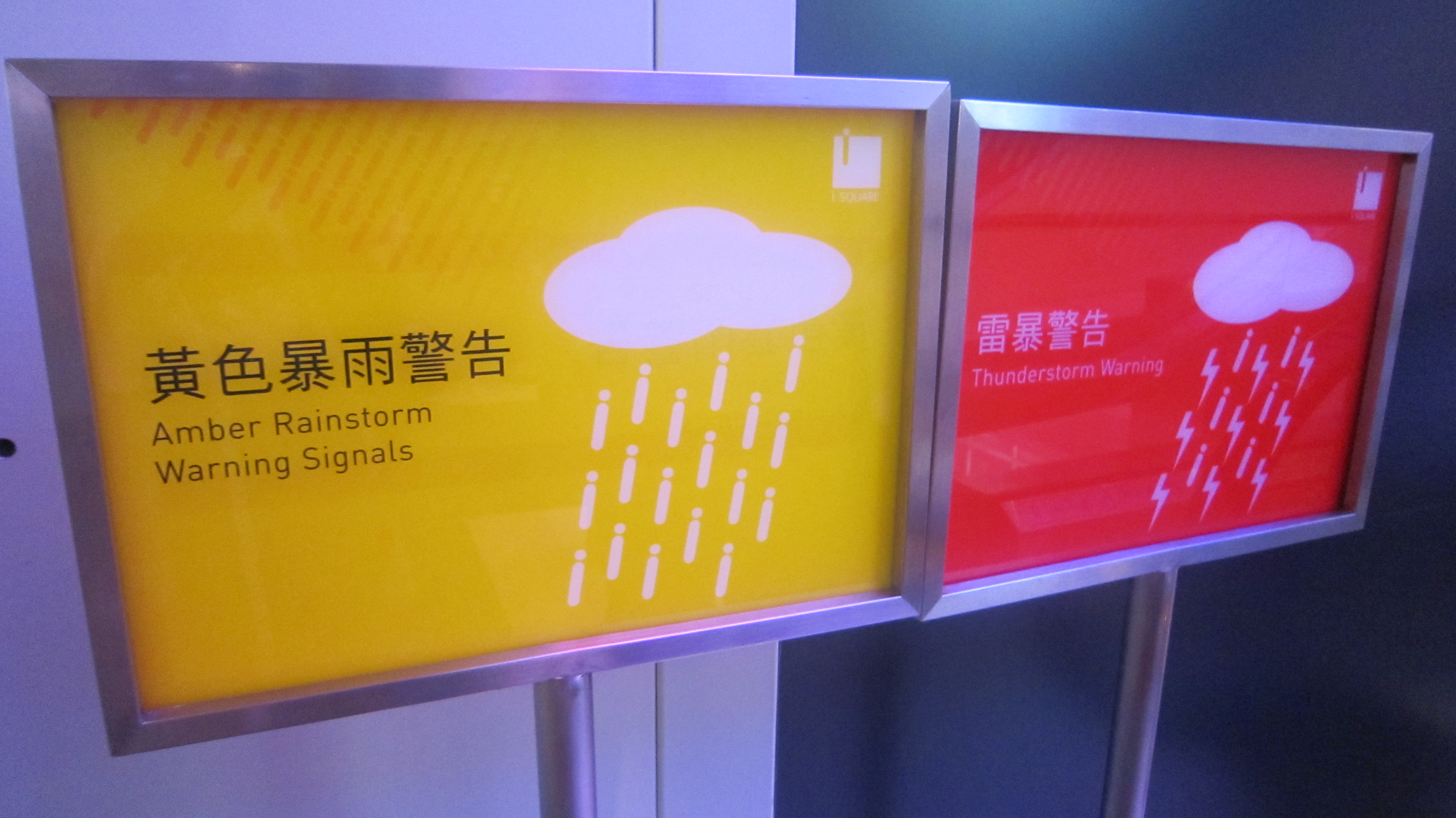
Amber rainstorm signal in shopping malls.

Signal	Sign	Definition and Precautions
AMBER rainstorm signal		This signal means: Heavy rain has fallen or is expected to fall generally over Hong Kong, exceeding 30 millimetres in an hour, and is likely to continue. The AMBER signal (Chinese: 黃色暴雨警告) gives alert about potential heavy rain that may develop into RED or BLACK signal situations. There will be flooding in some low-lying areas and poorly drained areas.
RED rainstorm signal		This signal means: Heavy rain has fallen or is expected to fall generally over Hong Kong, exceeding 50 millimetres in an hour, and is likely to continue. The RED signal (Chinese: 紅色暴雨警告) gives alert about potential heavy rain that may develop into BLACK signal situations. All students are to remain at school unless there is a visible risk to staying in the building. If still at home, all students are to stay at home until further notice. Listen to radios or check weather.
BLACK rainstorm signal		This signal means: Very heavy rain has fallen or is expected to fall generally over Hong Kong, exceeding 70 millimetres in an hour, and is likely to continue. When the BLACK signal (Chinese: 黑色暴雨警告) is issued, Hong Kong will come to a complete standstill. Schools will not dismiss students unless there is a visible risk to staying at school, and everyone is recommended to seek shelter immediately. Buses and other forms of public transport may be halted after a while to allow commuters to go home, depending on demand and the level of risk along the route. MTR services will be limited or suspended because of the risk of flooding.

The RED and BLACK signals warn the public of heavy rain which is likely to bring about serious road flooding and traffic congestion. They will trigger response actions by Government departments and major transport and utility operators. The public will be given clear advice on the appropriate actions to take.

== History ==
Heavy rain warning was first introduced in April 1967 together with thunderstorm warning by the Royal Observatory of Hong Kong as a result of the three rainstorms in 1966 which claimed 86 lives. The heavy rain warning was issued when an hourly rainfall of more than 50 mm (2 inches before metrication) was expected in six hours. Both heavy rain and thunderstorm warnings were issued to the public through press release, radio broadcast and telephone calling service to subscribers. In 1983, the heavy rain warning was replaced by flood and landslip warnings.

On 8 May 1992, the Royal Observatory of Hong Kong recorded 109.9 mm rainfall from 6 o'clock to 7 o'clock in the morning, breaking the hourly rainfall record on 12 June 1966. The torrential rain caused over 200 cases of flooding and many landslips. Road traffic was paralysed. Some roads in Admiralty were turned into rapids washing several people away. However, the Education Department did not announce school closure until 11 am, so many students braved the elements to go to schools, but some of them only found on arrival that their schools were closed, and parents were confused and worried for the safety of their children. Five people, including two children, were killed by landslides, lightning and rapid flooding. Because of this rainstorm, the Observatory proposed Hong Kong rainstorm warning signals which included three colours, amber, red and black. The amber signal were the first stage of the warning system based on forecast of heavy rainstorms, and were used to alert government departments and major public transport and utility services. The red and black signals were the second stage of the warning system based on actual rainfall levels recorded, and were issued to the public.

- Amber: More than 50 mm of rain is expected in the Hong Kong region within six hours.
- Red: Rainstorm has started and more than 50 mm of rain has been recorded over a wide area within the last hour or less.
- Black: More than 100 mm of rain has been recorded within the past two hours or less.

On 4 June 1997, the red signal was issued at 7.05 am, but the Education Department only decided to close afternoon schools at 10.30 am, saying that it did not close morning schools in spite of the red signal because many students were heading to schools at that time. Following criticisms by the Ombudsman, the Hong Kong Observatory revised the rainstorm warning system to the current one in 1998, and the Education Department also revised the school closure system for rainstorm. The current rainstorm warning system consists of three signals based on both predicted and recorded rainfall levels, and all three signals are issued to the public.

== See also ==
- Hong Kong Observatory
- Hong Kong tropical cyclone warning signals
