= Office of Civil Defense (Philippines) =

Agency of the Philippine government

- Tanggapan ng Tanggulang Sibil
- Seal

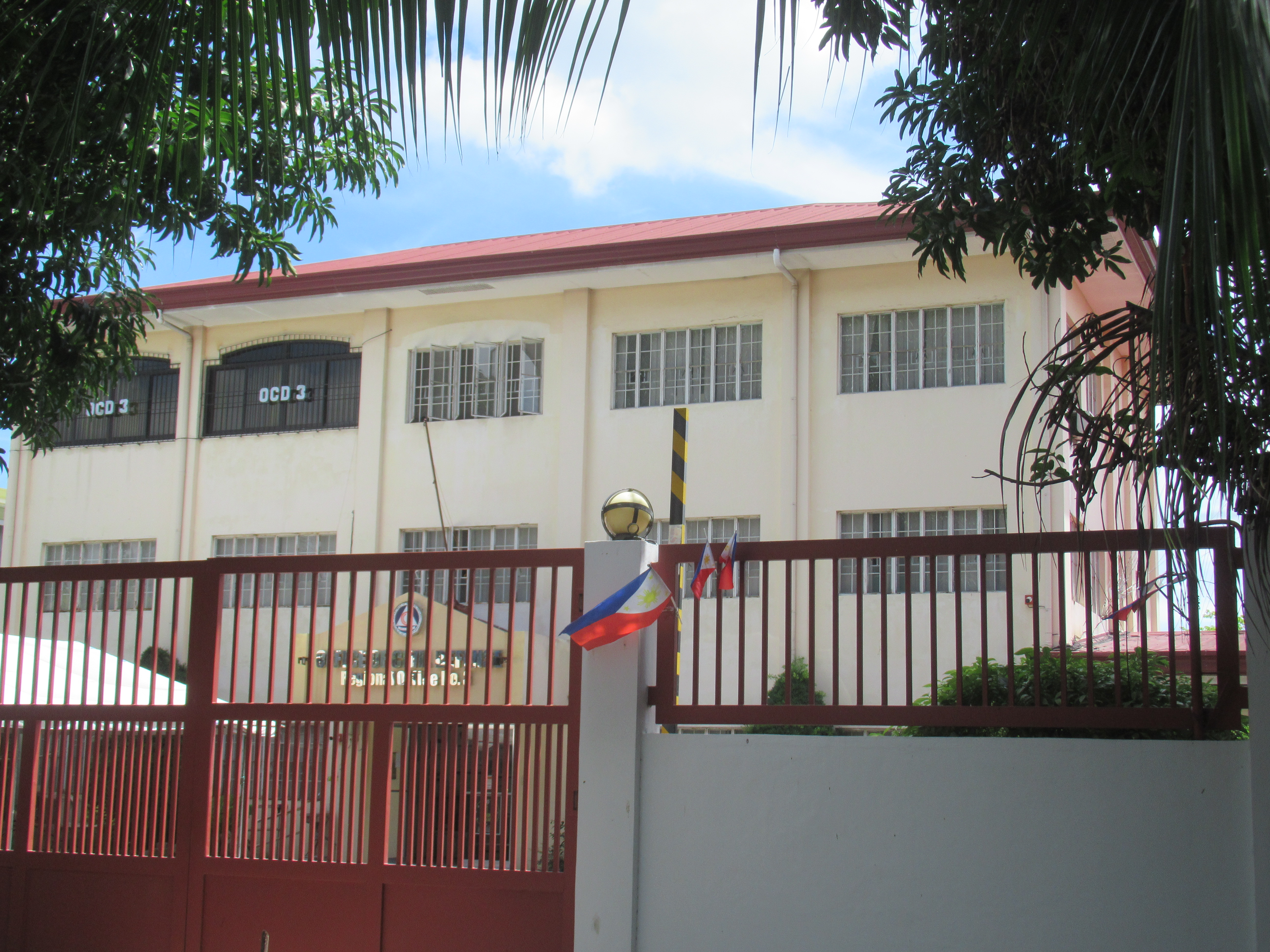

Agency overview
- Formed: August 18, 1954; 71 years ago (as the National Civil Defense Administration); December 31, 1972; 53 years ago (as the Office of Civil Defense)
- Preceding agency: National Civil Defense Administration
- Headquarters: Camp General Emilio Aguinaldo, Quezon City, Philippines
- Employees: 551 (2024)
- Annual budget: ₱1.24 billion (2020)
- Agency executive: Harold N. Cabreros, Administrator
- Parent agency: Department of National Defense
- Website: www.ocd.gov.ph

The Office of Civil Defense (OCD; Filipino: Tanggapan ng Tanggulang Sibil (TTS)) is an organization within the Philippines' Department of National Defense (DND) and serves as the implementing arm of the National Disaster Risk Reduction and Management Council (NDRRMC). As such, it has the primary mission of administering a comprehensive national civil defense and disaster risk reduction and management program by providing leadership in the continuous development of strategic and systematic approaches as well as measures to reduce the vulnerabilities and risks to hazards and manage the consequences of disasters.
