= National Disaster Risk Reduction and Management Council =

Philippine government agency

- Pambansang Sanggunian para sa Pagtugon ng Sakuna

Agency overview
- Formed: June 11, 1978; 48 years ago
- Preceding agency: National Disaster Coordinating Council (June 11, 1978 – August 2011)
- Type: Strategic Emergency Management
- Jurisdiction: National
- Headquarters: Camp Aguinaldo, EDSA cor. Boni Serrano, Quezon City, Philippines; 14°36′49″N 121°03′54″E
- Agency executives: Usec. Harold N. Cabreros, Executive Director; Defense Sec. Gilberto C. Teodoro Jr., Chairman
- Parent agency: Department of National Defense
- Website: ndrrmc.gov.ph

The National Disaster Risk Reduction and Management Council (NDRRMC), formerly known as the National Disaster Coordinating Council (NDCC) until August 2011, is a working group of various government, non-government, civil sector and private sector organizations of the Government of the Republic of the Philippines established on June 11, 1978, by Presidential Decree 1566. It is administered by the Office of Civil Defense (OCD) under the Department of National Defense (DND). The council is responsible for ensuring the protection and welfare of the people during disasters or emergencies. The NDRRMC plans and leads the guiding activities in the field of communication, warning signals, emergency, transportation, evacuation, rescue, engineering, health and rehabilitation, public education and auxiliary services such as fire fighting and the police in the country. The Council utilizes the UN Cluster Approach in disaster management. It is the country's focal for the ASEAN Agreement on Disaster Management and Emergency Response (AADMER) and many other related international commitments.

== Council membership ==
Situation Briefing of the NDRRMC with President Bongbong Marcos

On May 27, 2010, during the administration of Gloria Macapagal-Arroyo, the Philippine Disaster Risk Reduction and Management Act of 2010 (RA 10121) was signed into law. The agency started to use the National Disaster Risk Reduction and Management Council (NDRRMC) name on October 2010 where it concurrently used with the National Disaster Coordinating Council (NDCC) until the NDCC name was entirely phased out in August 2011 during the administration of Arroyo's successor Benigno Aquino III. The following heads of agencies compose the NDRRMC:

As of June 30, 2022, these are the following members of the council:

Position	Ex-officio Member
Chairperson	Secretary of National Defense
Executive Director of Disaster Risk Reduction and Management	Under Secretary of the National Disaster Risk Reduction and Management Council
Vice Chairperson for Disaster Preparedness	Secretary of the Interior and Local Government
Vice Chairperson for Disaster Prevention and Mitigation	Secretary of Science and Technology
Vice Chairperson for Disaster Response	Secretary of Social Welfare and Development
Vice Chairperson for Rehabilitation and Recovery	Director-General, National Economic and Development Authority
Members	Secretary of Health
Members	Secretary of Environment and Natural Resources
Members	Secretary of Information and Communications Technology
Members	Secretary of Agriculture
Members	Secretary of Education
Members	Secretary of Energy
Members	Secretary of Finance
Members	Secretary of Trade and Industry
Members	Secretary of Transportation
Members	Secretary of Budget and Management
Members	Secretary of Public Works and Highways
Members	Secretary of Foreign Affairs
Members	Secretary of Justice
Members	Secretary of Labor and Employment
Members	Secretary of Tourism
Members	Executive Secretary
Members	Presidential Adviser on the Peace Process
Members	Chairperson, Commission on Higher Education
Members	Chief of Staff of the Armed Forces of the Philippines
Members	Chief of the Philippine National Police
Members	Commandant of the Philippine Coast Guard
Members	Secretary of the Presidential Communications Office
Members	Secretary-General of the Philippine Red Cross
Members	Commissioner of the National Anti-Poverty Commission - Victims of Disasters and Calamities Sector
Members	Chairperson of the Philippine Commission on Women
Members	Secretary of the Human Settlements and Urban Development
Members	Executive-Director of the Climate Change Office of the Climate Change Commission
Members	President of the Government Service Insurance System
Members	President of the Social Security System
Members	President of the Philippine Health Insurance Corporation
Members	President of the Union of Local Authorities of the Philippines
Members	President of the League of Provinces of the Philippines
Members	President of the League of Municipalities of the Philippines
Members	President of the League of Cities of the Philippines
Members	President of the Liga ng Mga Barangay
Members	Four representatives from Civil Society Organizations
Members	One representative from the Private Sector
Members	Administrator of the Office of Civil Defense
Members	Chief of the Presidential Management Staff
Members	Special Assistant to the President
Members	Director-General of the Technical Education and Skills Development Authority

== Local DRRM Offices ==
According of Republic Act 10121, various local governments throughout the country should establish Local DRRM Offices at the regional, provincial, municipal, city and barangay levels. As functional arms of the local governments, these Offices are responsible to create a Local Disaster Risk Reduction and Management Plan according to the Framework of the NDRRMC covering four aspects including disaster preparedness, response, prevention and mitigation, and rehabilitation and recovery.

Local Offices usually have a Chief DRRM Officer supported by Administrative and Training, Research and Planning, Operations and Warning Officers. Some of these Offices have advanced to organizing their own search and rescue and emergency medical services squads and command-control-and-communications centers.

== Pre-disaster ==
The Philippines passed the Declaration of State of Imminent Disaster Act (RA 12287) in September 2025, establishing a framework for early government action and funding release ahead of disasters.

== Disaster response ==
=== Typhoon Haiyan (Yolanda) ===
The NDRRMC was in charge of gathering and reporting data in the wake of Typhoon Haiyan. On November 15, 2014, the agency reported 5,632 deaths, 1,140 people missing and 12,166 injured. The agency has reported the rose of death toll to 6,190 deaths, 1,785 missing and 28, 626 injured. They also estimated that the typhoon cost ₱36.6 billion damage to the infrastructure and agriculture of the Visayan Region. As of April 17, 2015, the National Disaster Risk Reduction and Management Council confirmed total of 6,300 deaths including 5,877 of those taking place in the Eastern Visayas.

=== Mount Pinatubo Eruption ===
When the population was put into a state of alert during the first phases of the Pinatubo crisis, authorities from the NDCC showed indisputable efficiency in managing the people.

==== Precautionary measures before sensing an eruption ====
Prior the eruption, no precautionary measures were taken until signs of activity were observed in 1991. This could be attributed to the absence of any oral or written records of volcanic activity for the past 400 years in the surrounding areas.

==== Precautionary measures after sensing an eruption ====
By April 3, 1991, PHIVOLCS, after having concluded that the volcano was reawakening, decided to evacuate Aetas villages that were lying within a radius of 10 km around the summit. On May 13, 1991, a 5-level warning and evacuation system was constituted. This system included a concentric danger zone surrounding the volcano, continuously fixing four radii of evacuation from 10 to 40 kilometers between June 7 and 18, which mostly depended on the evolution of the threat. On the day of June 26, 1991, orders of evacuation were conveyed to local authorities or Coordination Councils (DCC). During those times, the entire zone located within the 10 km radius around the crater of Pinatubo has been decreed as permanent high risk sector by PHIVOLCS prohibiting all human occupation of the zone.

In the time of Pinatubo’s eruptive phase in June 1991, most of the population reacted favorably to the evacuation orders due to the early preparation and coordination efforts the authorities on the field have demonstrated. However, there were still some Aetas that changed their minds and decided to return to the mountains seeking refuge in caves and spiritual comfort from their God. There were also others that refused to leave, having been convinced that the expected eruption would not be extreme enough to reach their homes, and having been scared at the thought of having to abandon their belongings and crops. By the time the second warning was given out in July 1992, the population, having been more aware of previous events, were much more prepared. Despite the PHIVOLCS frequent pleas and the population's positive response to it though, a total of 300 Aetas families still refused to evacuate.

== Post-disaster recovery ==
Under the DRRM Act, the National Economic and Development Authority (NEDA) is designated as the lead agency for the recovery. NEDA is mandated to coordinate the recovery support functions of national government agencies, local governments, and civil society organizations (CSOs). However, during the recovery from Typhoon Haiyan, NDRRMC was caught unprepared due to the typhoon's overwhelming impacts. It was in this context that the government, through the President's Memorandum Order 62 of December 2013, created the Office of the Presidential Assistant for Rehabilitation and Recovery (OPARR) to focus exclusively on coordinating the recovery process. OPARR aims to unify efforts of the government and other institutions involved in recovery. It has special power to mobilize the full resources of the country and to expedite the decision-making process under the direct authority of the President. OPARR was dissolved after two years.

According to a 2025 report, the Philippines is among the top-ten most climate-risk-prone countries worldwide, ranked 7th overall, due to decades of extreme weather events, heavy storm frequency, floods, and typhoons, causing significant fatalities and economic loss.

== See also ==
- Office of Civil Defense
- Department of National Defense
- Ministry of Public Order and Safety (BARMM)
