= Palanan =

Municipality in Isabela, Philippines

- Municipality
- Municipality of Palanan
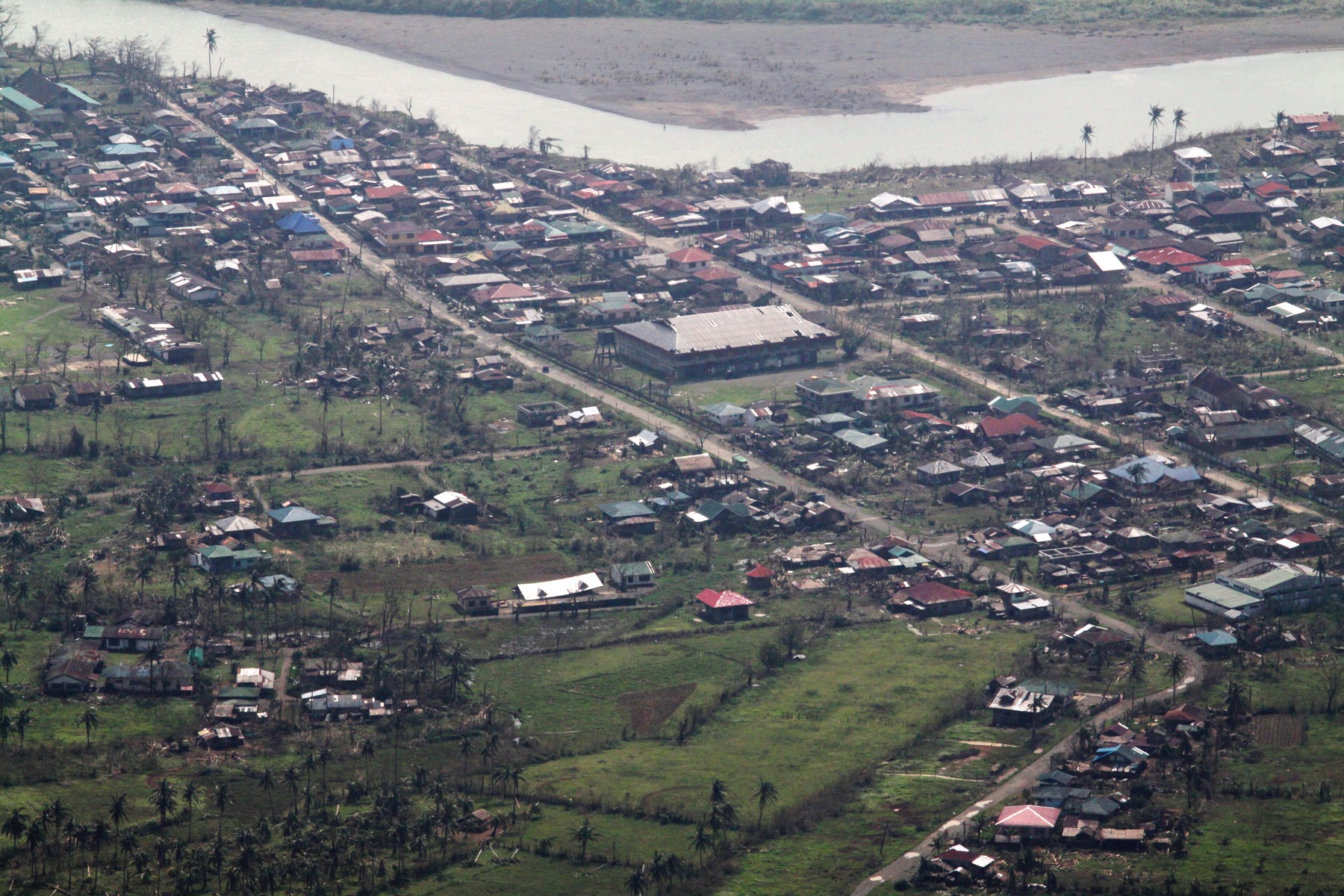
- Aerial view of Palanan after Super Typhoon Megi (PAGASA name:Juan)

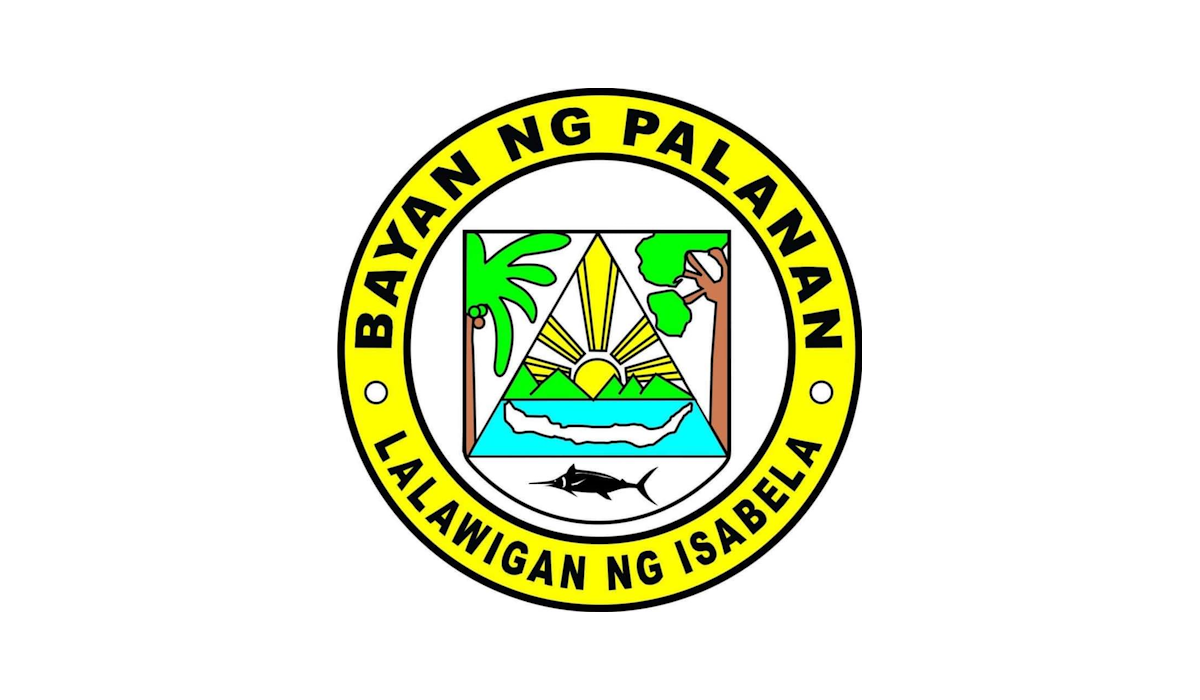
- Flag Seal

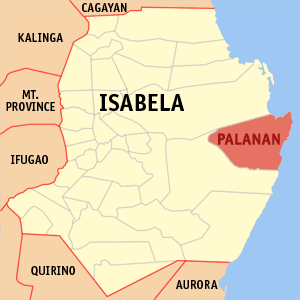
- Map of Isabela with Palanan highlighted
- Interactive map of Palanan
- Location within the Philippines
- Coordinates: 17°03′32″N 122°25′48″E
- Country: Philippines
- Region: Cagayan Valley
- Province: Isabela
- District: 2nd district
- Founded: July 22, 1609
- Barangays: 17 (see Barangays)

Government
  - Type: Sangguniang Bayan
  - Mayor: Angelo A. Bernardo
  - Vice Mayor: Elizabeth B. Ochoa
  - Representative: Ed Christopher S. Go
  - Electorate: 12,460 voters (2025)

Area
  - Total: 880.24 km^{2} (339.86 sq mi)
- Elevation: 52 m (171 ft)
- Highest elevation: 273 m (896 ft)
- Lowest elevation: 0 m (0 ft)

Population (2024 census)
  - Total: 18,091
  - Density: 20.552/km^{2} (53.230/sq mi)
  - Households: 4,537

Economy
  - Income class: 1st municipal income class
  - Poverty incidence: 16.98% (2023)
  - Revenue: ₱ 311.6 million (2024)
  - Assets: ₱ 667.2 million (2024)
  - Expenditure: ₱ 263.6 million (2024)
  - Liabilities: ₱ 91.95 million (2024)

Service provider
  - Electricity: Isabela 2 Electric Cooperative (ISELCO 2)
- Time zone: UTC+8 (PST)
- ZIP code: 3334
- PSGC: 0203121000
- IDD : area code: +63 (0)78
- Native languages: Paranan; Ibanag; Ilocano; Paranan Agta; Tagalog
- Website: www.palanan-isabela.gov.ph

Palanan [pɐˈlanan], officially the Municipality of Palanan (Ibanag: Ili nat Palanan; Ilocano: Ili ti Palanan; Tagalog: Bayan ng Palanan), is a municipality in the province of Isabela, Philippines. According to the 2024 census, it has a population of 18,091 people.

It also served as the final capital of the First Philippine Republic from 1900 until the capture of President Emilio Aguinaldo by the Americans during the Philippine-American War in 1901.

== Etymology ==
Since the location was surrounded by Aetas, the Ibanags from the lowland Isabela would warn their close friends with the term "Palanammu" which indicates uneasiness or caution. Similarly, some vagabond Tagalogs who arrived there either as a sanctuary during difficult sailing or pure adventure, dubbed the site "Palatanan" which is suggestive of the character of the residents. Eventually, the word transformed into its modern name "Palanan".

== History ==
Unlike other towns in the Cagayan Valley, Palanan was established on July 22, 1609 by Spanish forces who arrived by boat from the Pacific coastal town of Baler in Tayabas province (now part of Aurora). As such, Palanan was initially a part of Pampanga before being transferred to Laguna, Tayabas (now Quezon Province; Tayabas became independent from Laguna), Nueva Ecija, Nueva Vizcaya and finally Isabela. Also, unlike the rest of Cagayan Valley, it was served by Franciscan missionaries rather than the Dominicans. The population of the town was natively Paranan, then subsequently augmented by local Negritos, migrants from Baler who are Tagalogs, and outlaws from Cagayan Valley, with the lingua franca of the settlement being Tagalog as opposed to Ilocano or Ibanag.

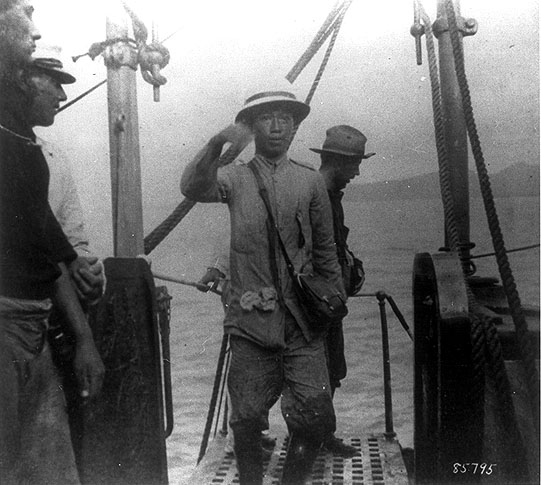
Emilio Aguinaldo boarding USS Vicksburg in Palanan Bay, facing the Philippine Sea

General Emilio Aguinaldo became President of the First Philippine Republic in 1900. He was captured on March 23 when Col. Frederick Funston led the Americans in 1901. It was in Palanan that one of the final chapters of the Philippine–American War was written on March 23, 1901, when General Emilio Aguinaldo was captured by American forces led by General Frederick Funston, who had gained access to Aguinaldo's camp by pretending to surrender to the Filipinos.

In 1978, the area around Palanan was proclaimed by President Ferdinand Marcos to be part of the Palanan Wilderness Area, a protected nature conservation area that was later expanded by President Fidel V. Ramos to become the Northern Sierra Madre Natural Park in 1997.

In the May 9, 2016 elections, Angelito A. Bernardo won a three-way mayoral campaign. However, due to his unexpected death shortly after the polls, Rodolfo M. Bernardo, the Municipal Vice Mayor-elect and first-elected Sangguniang Bayan member, Elizabeth Bernardo- Ochoa took the oath of office as Municipal Mayor & Municipal Vice Mayor respectively. On July 1, 2016, the Municipal Vice Mayor and other winning candidates attended the ceremony in Ilagan City, which serves as the provincial capitol. Mayor Rodolfo M. Bernardo served as the local chief executive for five months and fifteen days before dying in a car accident. According to the rules of succession, his sister, Vice Mayor Elizabeth Bernardo-Ochoa took the oath of office as Municipal Mayor and has remained in charge as the local Chief Executive ever since.

== Geography ==
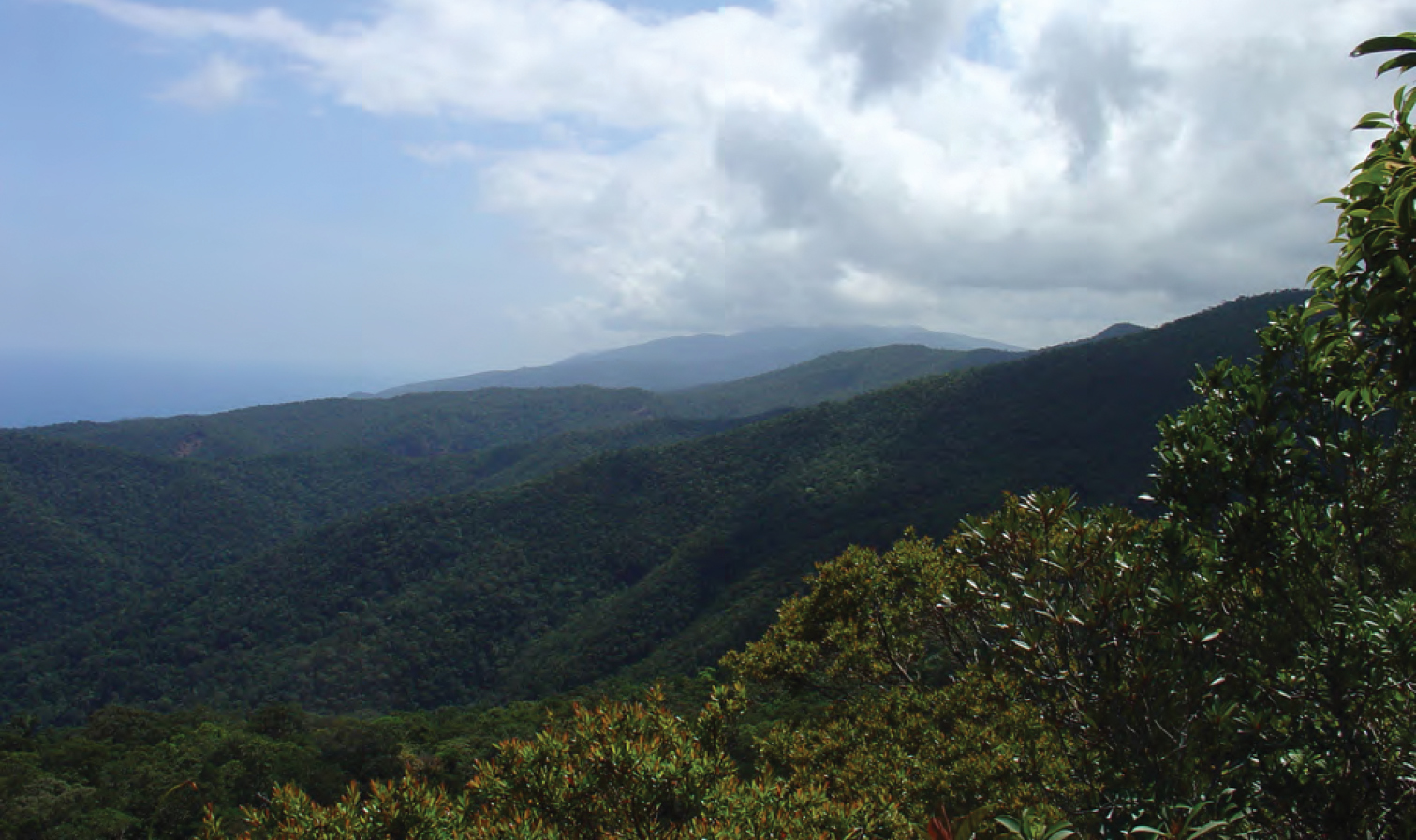
Northern Sierra Madre Mountain Range

Palanan is one of the four remote and isolated coastal towns of Isabela facing the Philippine Sea on the east and separated from the rest of the province by the Sierra Madre Mountains.

=== Barangays ===
Palanan is politically subdivided into 17 barangays. Each barangay consists of puroks while some have sitios.

- Alomanay
- Bisag
- Dicabisagan East (Poblacion)
- Dicabisagan West (Poblacion)
- Culasi
- Dialaoyao
- Dibewan
- Dicadyuan
- Dicotkotan
- Diddadungan
- Didyan
- Dimalicu-licu
- Dimasari
- Dimatican
- Ditambali
- Maligaya
- Marikit

=== Climate ===
Climate data for Palanan, Isabela
Month	Jan	Feb	Mar	Apr	May	Jun	Jul	Aug	Sep	Oct	Nov	Dec	Year
Mean daily maximum °C (°F)	27 (81)	27 (81)	29 (84)	28 (82)	27 (81)	25 (77)	26 (79)	27 (81)	31 (88)	29 (84)	27 (81)	27 (81)	28 (82)
Mean daily minimum °C (°F)	20 (68)	20 (68)	21 (70)	20 (68)	21 (70)	20 (68)	21 (70)	22 (72)	23 (73)	23 (73)	21 (70)	21 (70)	21 (70)
Average precipitation mm (inches)	162 (6.4)	156 (6.1)	90 (3.5)	60 (2.4)	144 (5.7)	201 (7.9)	159 (6.3)	108 (4.3)	111 (4.4)	237 (9.3)	276 (10.9)	171 (6.7)	1,875 (73.9)
Average rainy days	14	12	11	11	16	19	16	14	16	18	18	15	180
Source: World Weather Online (modeled/calculated data, not measured locally)

== Demographics ==
Population census of Palanan
Year	Pop.	±% p.a.
1903	1,080	—
1918	2,410	+5.50%
1939	3,109	+1.22%
1948	4,045	+2.97%
1960	5,599	+2.75%
1970	7,518	+2.99%
1975	8,930	+3.51%
1980	10,295	+2.88%
1990	11,431	+1.05%
1995	13,220	+2.76%
2000	15,317	+3.21%
2007	16,254	+0.82%
2010	16,094	−0.36%
2015	17,260	+1.34%
2020	17,684	+0.51%
2024	18,091	+0.55%
Source: Philippine Statistics Authority

In the 2024 census, the population of Palanan was 18,091 people, with a density of 21 inhabitants per square kilometre or 54 inhabitants per square mile.

== Economy ==
Poverty incidence of Palanan (%)

Source: Philippine Statistics Authority

== Government ==
=== Local government ===
As a municipality in the Province of Isabela, government officials at the provincial and municipal levels are voted by the town. The provincial government has political jurisdiction over most local transactions of the municipal government.

The Municipality of Palanan is governed by a mayor, designated as its Local Chief Executive, and by a municipal council as its legislative body in accordance with the Local Government Code. The mayor, vice mayor, and the municipal councilors are elected directly in elections held every three years.

Barangays are also headed by elected officials: Barangay Captain, Barangay Council, whose members are called Barangay Councilors. The barangays have SK federation which represents the barangay, headed by SK chairperson and whose members are called SK councilors. All officials are also elected every three years.

=== Elected officials ===
Members of the Palanan Municipal Council (2022-2025)
Position	Name
District Representative	Ed Christopher S. Go
Municipal Mayor	Angelo A. Bernardo
Municipal Vice-Mayor	Elizabeth B. Ochoa
Municipal Councilors	Theo Angelo A. Garcia
Municipal Councilors	Justin Kerby S. Bernardo
Municipal Councilors	Eden S. Bernardo
Municipal Councilors	Pacita Q. Atanacio
Municipal Councilors	Ronnie A. Atienza
Municipal Councilors	Michael John D. Bernardo
Municipal Councilors	Ronaldo M. Bernardo
Municipal Councilors	Rhoena O. Corpuz

=== Congress representation ===
Palanan, belonging to the second legislative district of the province of Isabela, currently represented by Hon. Ed Christopher S. Go.

== Education ==
The Schools Division of Isabela governs the town's public education system. The division office is a field office of the DepEd in Cagayan Valley region. The Palanan Schools District Office governs the public elementary and high schools throughout the municipality including schools located in Dinapigue, Divilacan, and Maconacon.

=== Primary and elementary schools ===
- Alomanay Elementary School
- Bisag Elementary School
- Centro West Primary School
- Culasi Elementary School
- Dialawyao Elementary School
- Dibungko Primary School
- Dibutarek Elementary School
- Diddadungan Elementary School
- Didiyan Elementary School
- Dikadyuan Elementary School
- Dimalicu-licu Primary School
- Dimasari Elementary School
- Dimatican Elementary School
- Dipadsanjan Primary School
- Disukad Elementary School
- Ditambali Elementary School
- Marikit Elementary School
- Palanan Central School
- San Isidro Elementary School
- Taknalan Primary School

=== Secondary schools ===
- Isabela School of Fisheries
- Palanan National High School
- Palanan School of Agriculture and Trades
- Dibewan Integrated School

== Infrastructure ==
The most common forms of transportation in Palanan are by horses, motorcycles, tricycles, or an improvised motorcycles called kuligligs. Due to its isolation, the town can be reached quickest by a 23-30 minute flight in a six-seater, single-engine Cyclone Air Cessna commuter plane from Cauayan. Palanan is served by Palanan Airport.

By water, a boat ride from the neighboring town of Divilacan or in the towns of Dingalan and Baler in Aurora in the south usually takes about two to three hours and six to seven hours, respectively.

There are no roads that connect Palanan to the rest of province as the town can only be reached by a plane or boat ride, or a multi-day hike over the Sierra Madre from the neighboring town of San Mariano, which could take about three to five days. However, there is a construction of the 82-kilometer Ilagan–Divilacan Road through the protected Sierra Madre is on-going to open access to the coastal towns of Divilacan, Palanan and Maconacon. The approved budget contract of the project amounting to P1.5B, will pass through the foothills of the 359,486-hectare Northern Sierra Madre mountain ranges. The project will improve an old logging road used by a defunct logging company until the 1990s. It will start in Barangay Sindon Bayabo in Ilagan and will end in Barangay Dicatian in Divilacan. The project was started in March 2016 and was expected to be completed in 2024.
