= List of storms named Megi =

The name Megi (Korean: 메기, [ˈme̞(ː)ɡi]) has been used for four tropical cyclones in the western North Pacific Ocean. The name was contributed by South Korea and means catfish in Korean.

- Typhoon Megi (2004) (T0415, 18W, Lawin) – moved through the Ryūkyū islands before passing between South Korea and Japan
- Typhoon Megi (2010) (T1013, 15W, Juan) – an extremely strong Category 5 typhoon that struck Luzon and China
- Typhoon Megi (2016) (T1617, 20W, Helen) – a large typhoon that made landfall in Taiwan as a Category 3 typhoon
- Tropical Storm Megi (2022) (T2202, 03W, Agaton) – a deadly tropical cyclone that stalled in Leyte Gulf, bringing widespread flooding to the Philippines

The name Megi was retired following the 2022 Pacific typhoon season and was replaced with Gosari (Korean: 고사리, [ko̞sʰa̠ɾi]), which means bracken in Korean.

== See also ==
- Cyclone Megh, a North Indian Ocean cyclone which had a similar spelling to Megi
- Cyclone Megan, an Australian region cyclone which also had a similar spelling to Megi
