= Ilagan–Divilacan Road =

Road in Isabela, Philippines

Route information
- Length: 82.004 km (50.955 mi)
- Status: Ongoing rehabilitation
- Existed: March 18, 2016–present
- Component highways: PH₱1.9 billion

Major junctions
- West end: Sindin Bayabo in Ilagan City, Isabela
- East end: Dicatian in Divilacan, Isabela

Location
- Country: Philippines
- Major cities: Ilagan City, and mainland Isabela
- Towns: Dinapigue, Divilacan, Maconacon, and Palanan

Highway system
- Roads in the Philippines; Highways; Expressways; List

The Ilagan–Divilacan Road is an 82.004-kilometer (50.955 mi) provincial road that connects the city of Ilagan and municipalities of Divilacan, Maconacon, and Palanan, all of the province of Isabela, Philippines.

It stretches through the Sierra Madre mountain range, giving better access to the remote towns in the eastern coast of Luzon in the province of Isabela. The road will enhance the transportation and improve the economic opportunities in the area and with regard to the access of goods and services to otherwise isolated areas. It will also give better access to tourist destinations like the beaches of Divilacan and the Northern Sierra Madre Natural Park.

== History ==
Rehabilitation of the old logging road crossing the Sierra Madre mountain range began around 2010, with attention given to protecting the rights of communities within the project area. Environmental compliance for the project was granted on July 27, 2012.

Construction officially started in December 2014 with an initial budget of PH₱2.28 billion. The road, intended to connect the coastal towns of Maconacon, Divilacan, Palanan, and Dinapigue, was inaugurated on March 18, 2016, in the city of Ilagan.

By July 2017, the road was reported to be approximately half finished. The contractor CM Pancho Construction, employed 654 workers, but the provincial government temporarily closed the road due to safety concerns and vehicular accidents.

In 2018, reports criticized the project for being overpriced, incomplete, environmentally harmful, and full of irregularities. Napoleon Dy asked the Department of Public Works and Highways to summon the contractor CM Pancho Construction, due to failure to complete the project. The report cited that the administration of the governor Bojie Dy, spent PH₱39 million per kilometer.

The Department of the Interior and Local Government allocated additional funds for rehabilitation and upgrading. In 2018, the department allocated PH₱77.43 million for 3.60 kilometer section. In 2019, the department allocated another PH₱113.3 million for a 5.47-kilometer section. In 2020, another PH₱35 million allocation for a 1.15-kilometer section. In 2021, the department allocated for the slope protection worth PH₱5 million in Brgy. Sindon Bayabo.

In the 2022 annual accomplishment report, the province of Isabela allocated PH₱1.38 billion under a loan agreement with Development Bank of the Philippines and awarded to CM Pancho Construction, the Commission on Audit cited the project is impractical to implement which caused the termination of the contract.

By 2023, local officials and residents continued to urge the provincial government to complete the road. In 2024, the Department of Public Works and Highways said in a statement regarding the potential full rehabilitation and opening of the road.

In July 2025, Tonypet Albano filed House Bill No. 2084 in the House of Representatives which seeks to convert the road from provincial into a national road. As of 2025, the rehabilitation project remains unfinished.
