= List of storms named Juan =

The name Juan has been used for five tropical cyclones worldwide: two in Atlantic Ocean and three in the Philippine Area of Responsibility of the Western Pacific Ocean. The name has also been used for one extratropical European windstorm.

In the Atlantic:

- Hurricane Juan (1985) – a Category 1 hurricane that affected the Gulf Coast of the United States, causing 12 deaths and $1.5 billion (1985 USD) in damage
- Hurricane Juan (2003) – a Category 2 hurricane that affected Canada's maritime provinces, causing 8 deaths and $200 million (2003 USD) in damage

Juan was retired from future use in the Atlantic after the 2003 season, and it was replaced with Joaquin for the 2009 season.

In the West Pacific:

- Tropical Depression 13W (2002) (Juan) – moved over the central Philippines, killing 14 people
- Typhoon Saomai (2006) (T0608, 08W, Juan) – a Category 5-equivalent typhoon that made landfall in Taiwan and China, killing 456 people and causing $2.5 billion (2006 USD) in damage
- Typhoon Megi (2010; T1013, 15W, Juan) – a Category 5-equivalent typhoon that made landfall in Luzon and China, causing $709 million (2010 USD) in damage

Juan was retired from future use in the West Pacific after the 2010 season, and it was replaced with Jose for the 2014 season.

In Europe:

- Storm Juan (2024) – affected the portions of Portugal and Spain.

== See also ==
- White Juan (2004) – an unofficial name given to the hurricane-strength nor'easter blizzard of February 2004 that affected most of the Eastern United States and Atlantic Canada
- Typhoon Uwan (2025) – a Pacific typhoon with a similar Philippine name; internationally known as Typhoon Fung-wong.
