= Typhoon Megi (2010) =

Pacific typhoon in 2010

Typhoon Megi (Juan)
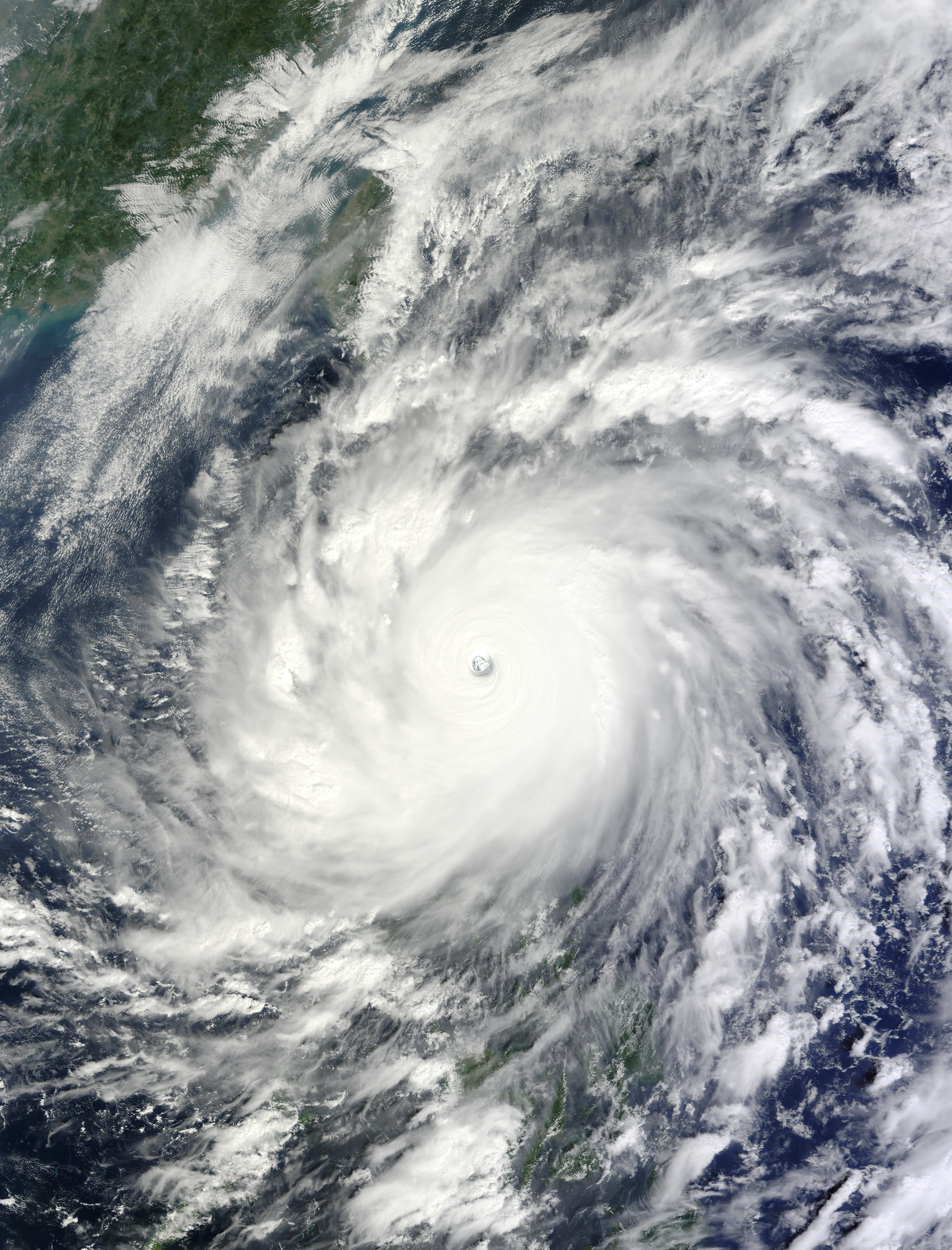
- Megi nearing landfall in the Philippines at peak intensity on October 18

Meteorological history
- Formed: October 12, 2010
- Dissipated: October 24, 2010

Violent typhoon
- 10-minute sustained (JMA)
- Highest winds: 230 km/h (145 mph)
- Lowest pressure: 885 hPa (mbar); 26.13 inHg

Category 5-equivalent super typhoon
- 1-minute sustained (SSHWS/JTWC)
- Highest winds: 295 km/h (185 mph)
- Lowest pressure: 903 hPa (mbar); 26.67 inHg

Overall effects
- Fatalities: 69
- Missing: 4
- Damage: $709 million (2010 USD)
- Areas affected: Philippines; Taiwan; Hong Kong; Macau; China
- IBTrACS
- Part of the 2010 Pacific typhoon season

Typhoon Megi, (Note: The name Megi (Korean: 메기, [ˈme̞(ː)ɡi]) was contributed by South Korea and refers to the Amur catfish (Silurus asotus) in Korean.) known in the Philippines as Typhoon Juan, was the strongest tropical cyclone of 2010 and is considered one of the most intense ever recorded. Megi was the thirteenth named storm, sixth typhoon and only super typhoon of the 2010 Pacific typhoon season. It originated out of a disturbance on October 12 southeast of Guam and slowly consolidated, with the Joint Typhoon Warning Center (JTWC) and Japan Meteorological Agency (JMA) designating it a tropical storm by the following day, giving it the name Megi. Steady intensification continued throughout the next few days, with Megi becoming a typhoon on October 14. Rapid intensification ensued under very favourable conditions, and Megi eventually became a super typhoon on October 17; peaking with a minimum central pressure of 885 millibars (26.1 inHg), one of the lowest on record. Early on October 18, Megi made its first landfall over Luzon at peak intensity. Land interaction caused Megi to weaken but gradually regained strength to a secondary peak in the South China Sea, before unfavourable conditions caused it to gradually deteriorate afterwards as it slowly moved north. Megi weakened to a tropical storm before making landfall over Zhangpu in Fujian, China on October 23; dissipating entirely the next day over China.

Megi killed 31 people and caused $255.1 million (2010 USD) in damage over Luzon, making it top twenty of the costliest typhoons in the Philippines. After moving to the South China Sea, the outflow of Megi and a weather front together brought torrential rainfall, caused $42.2 million (2010 USD) in damage and killed 38 people in Yilan, Taiwan, making Megi the deadliest typhoon of 2010s in Taiwan. Megi also caused US$411.7 million in damage over Fujian, China, although there were no deaths by the storm in the province. Total losses from Megi were estimated at US$709 million, and a total of 69 people killed as a result of the typhoon. Despite the intensity and destruction, the name Megi was not retired, and was used again in 2016 until its retirement in 2022, although the name Juan was retired by PAGASA.

== Meteorological history ==
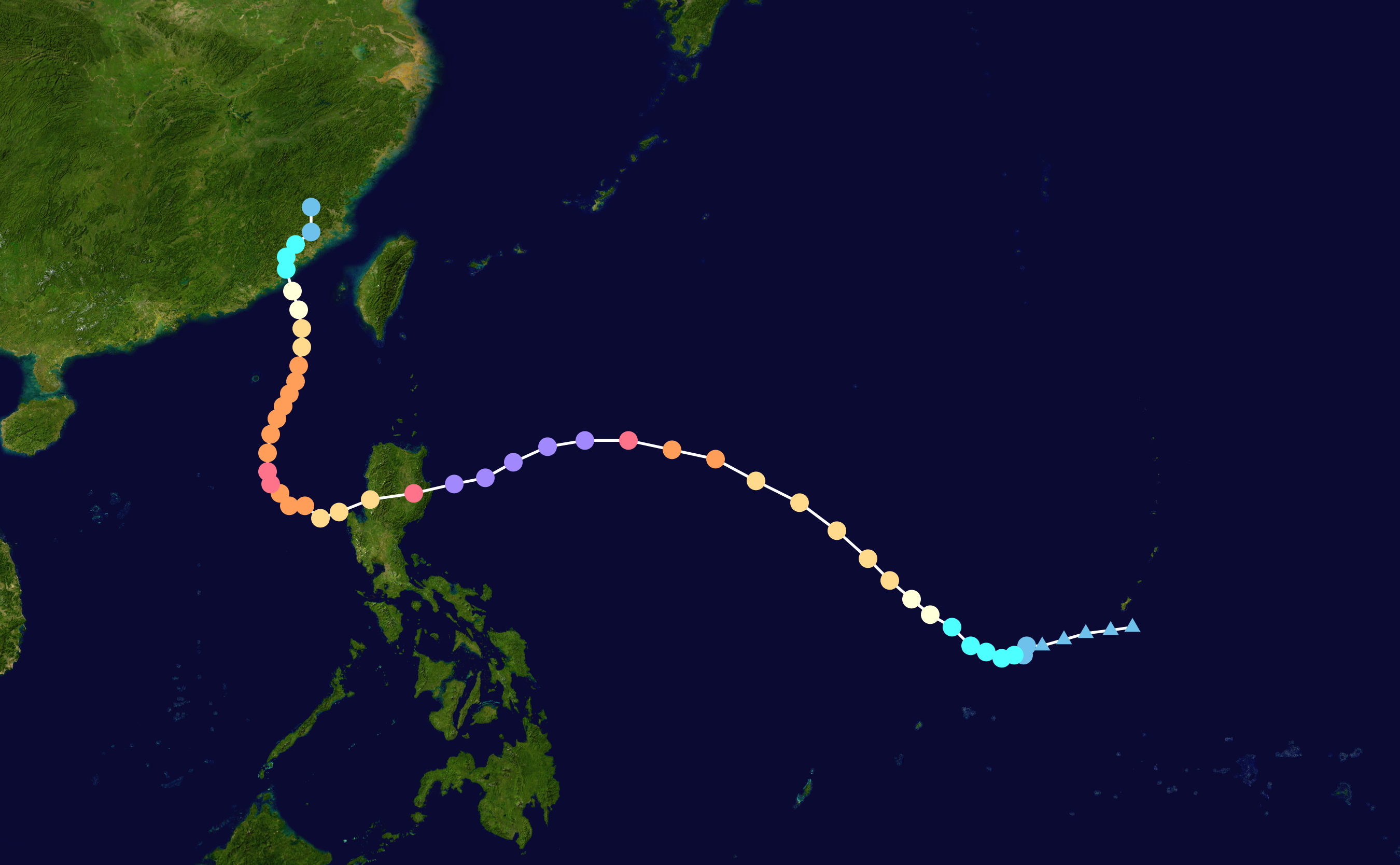
Map plotting the storm's track and intensity, according to the Saffir–Simpson scale Map key Saffir–Simpson scale Tropical depression (≤38 mph, ≤62 km/h) Tropical storm (39–73 mph, 63–118 km/h) Category 1 (74–95 mph, 119–153 km/h) Category 2 (96–110 mph, 154–177 km/h) Category 3 (111–129 mph, 178–208 km/h) Category 4 (130–156 mph, 209–251 km/h) Category 5 (≥157 mph, ≥252 km/h) Unknown Storm type Tropical cyclone Subtropical cyclone Extratropical cyclone, remnant low, tropical disturbance, or monsoon depression

Late on October 10, a tropical disturbance formed east-southeast of Guam. There were favorable environmental conditions, such as low vertical wind shear, good upper-level divergence and poleward outflow. The system began to significantly develop on October 12, prompting the Joint Typhoon Warning Center (JTWC) issuing a Tropical Cyclone Formation Alert at 09:00 UTC. Several hours later, the Japan Meteorological Agency (JMA) began monitoring the system as a tropical depression. Early on October 13, JTWC also classified the system as a tropical depression and designated it 15W. Hours later, well-defined convective banding features developed around the system and thunderstorm activity over the center of circulation increased. Sea surface temperatures above 28 °C (82 °F) and high oceanic heat content allowed for further strengthening. Situated to the southwest of a subtropical ridge, the system slowly tracked west-northwest towards the Philippines. Around 12:00 UTC, the system further intensified into a tropical storm, earning the name Megi from JMA.

Late on October 13, Tropical Storm Megi became quasi-stationary, but a mid-latitude trough moving from the west caused the storm to resume a northwestward track around the periphery of the subtropical ridge. Throughout the morning of October 14, a central dense overcast developed over the center of Megi, allowing for intensification. Later that day, microwave imagery showed a developing mid-level eye feature, resulting in JMA upgrading the system to a severe tropical storm and JTWC upgrading it to a typhoon. Around this time, Megi began to be observed by Hurricane Hunters from the United States Air Force's (USAF) 53rd Weather Reconnaissance Squadron, as part of a field campaign researching typhoon impacts on the ocean. On their first flight, they verified the microwave data of a developing eye within the cyclone. On October 15, JMA upgraded Megi to a typhoon, and the Philippine Atmospheric, Geophysical and Astronomical Services Administration (PAGASA) began to mention the typhoon and named it Juan as it entered the Philippine Area of Responsibility, with improved outflow over the western semi-circle and a well-defined low-level circulation center with tightly curved banding; steady intensification continued thereafter. By the afternoon of October 16, Megi began to undergo rapid intensification with a well-defined eye developing, and enhanced poleward outflow developing due to a transitory mid-latitude trough.

Animated microwave loop of Megi at peak intensity and making landfall on Luzon from October 17–18

Early on October 17, Megi started to moved westward and then west-southwestward because of the subtropical ridge. Based on aircraft data, increased satellite estimates and a circular 20 nautical miles (37 km; 23 mi) diameter eye, JTWC upgraded Megi to a category 5-equivalent super typhoon on the Saffir–Simpson hurricane wind scale, becoming the only super typhoon in 2010. Hurricane Hunters later that morning found Megi to have become extremely intense, measuring near-record-high flight-level winds of 352 km/h (219 mph), while the Stepped-Frequency Microwave Radiometer (SFMR) found surface winds near 305 km/h (190 mph), in addition to the pressure dropping to 890 mb (26 inHg). They also noted that there was frequent lightning within Megi's eyewall. Additionally, a dropsonde recorded a maximum wind gust aloft of 399 km/h (248 mph); this stood as a world record until surpassed by the North Atlantic's Hurricane Melissa in 2025 fifteen years later. Based on the measurements, the JTWC set Megi's maximum intensity at 295 km/h (185 mph), although the pressure was listed in post-analysis as nearly 20 millibars (0.59 inHg) higher than what the Hurricane Hunters actually observed. Six hours later at 18:00 UTC, the JMA assessed that Megi had strengthened slightly afterwards and reached peak intensity with maximum sustained winds at 230 km/h (145 mph) and a minimum pressure of 885 hPa (26.13 inHg), making Megi one of the most intense tropical cyclones on record. An eyewall replacement cycle began to commence later that day, though Megi remained steady in intensity until it made landfall over Isabela, Philippines at 03:25 UTC (11:25 PST) on October 18. When passing the Sierra Madre, the eye filled due to land interaction, but tightly curved banding and excellent radial outflow remained.

The weakened typhoon emerged into the South China Sea late on October 18, and it began to reorganize. On October 19, Megi formed an enlarged but ragged eye. Late on the same day, Megi turned northwestward and moved slowly due to the significantly weakening western subtropical ridge in response to a deepening mid-latitude shortwave trough moving into Southeast China. Megi turned northward then north-northeastward towards a break in the subtropical ridge caused by an approaching mid-latitude trough on October 20. By low vertical wind shear and good radial outflow especially on the poleward channel, the typhoon started to gradually intensify. On October 21, JMA reported that Megi attained its secondary peak intensity by the 10-minute maximum sustained winds reaching 95 knots (175 km/h; 110 mph) and the atmospheric pressure decreasing to 935 hPa (27.61 inHg). On October 22, the eye of Typhoon Megi became cloud-filled and convection begun eroding due to increasing vertical wind shear. Late on the same day, JMA downgraded Megi to a severe tropical storm in the Taiwan Strait because of subsidence induced by a developing upper-level trough west of the storm. On October 23, Megi made landfall over Zhangpu in Fujian, China at 04:55 UTC. Soon, Megi weakened to a tropical storm in mainland China, as the majority of convection associated with the system has dissipated, prompting JTWC issuing a final warning. Megi further weakened to a tropical depression late on October 23. On October 24, the tropical depression dissipated completely around 12:00 UTC, though according to the JTWC Best Track Data analysis, Megi became extratropical at 00:00 UTC on the next day.

=== Records ===
The Japan Meteorological Agency (JMA) analysed that the 10-minute maximum sustained winds of Typhoon Megi in 2010 was 125 knots (232 km/h; 144 mph), making it the second strongest tropical cyclone in the Northwest Pacific Ocean on record along with Bess in 1982 and Haiyan in 2013, only after Tip in 1979. The Hong Kong Observatory analysed that Megi was the strongest tropical cyclone in the Northwest Pacific Ocean since Tip in 1979 by attaining the 10-minute maximum sustained winds at 270 km/h (145 knots, 165 mph). A hurricane hunter aircraft indicated 1-minute maximum sustained surface winds of 165 knots (306 km/h; 190 mph) and minimum pressure was 890 hPa (26.3 inHg) at peak intensity, which was equivalent to Tip in 1979.

Megi's atmospheric pressure estimated by JMA was 885 hPa (26.13 inHg), the lowest since Vanessa in 1984 and the eighth lowest in the Northwest Pacific Ocean on record; in addition, Megi was the first tropical cyclone in the Northwest Pacific Ocean having the atmospheric pressure below 900 hPa (27 inHg) since Yuri in 1991. When reaching peak intensity at 18:00 UTC on October 17 and 00:00 UTC on October 18, Megi's Current Intensity (CI) number of the Dvorak technique was 8.0, the highest number. According to JMA's advisory, Megi still maintained its peak strength at 03:00 UTC on October 18, making it one of the strongest tropical cyclones to make landfall on record at 03:25 UTC. Moreover, Megi was the latest-forming storm to make landfall over Fujian, China since 1949.

In addition, a dropsonde positioned in the eyewall recorded a wind gust of 215.51 knots (399.12 km/h; 248.00 mph), which was the highest wind speed ever measured by dropsonde until the North Atlantic's Hurricane Melissa surpassed it in 2025.

== Preparations ==
=== Highest Public Storm Warning Signal ===
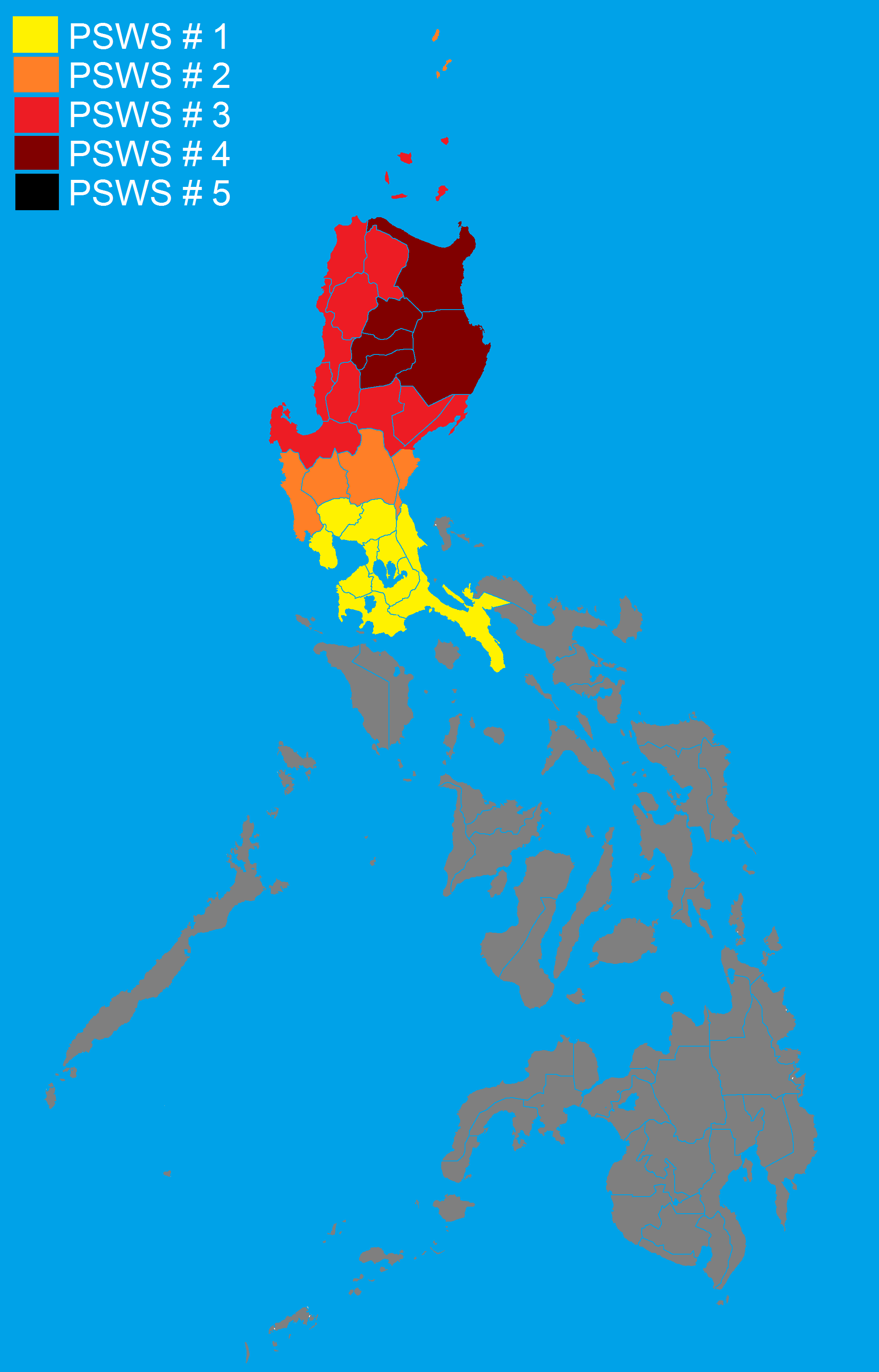
Highest public storm signals raised by PAGASA

PSWS#	Luzon	Visayas	Mindanao
4	Cagayan, Isabela, Ifugao, Mt. Province, Kalinga	None	None
3	Babuyan Islands, Ilocos Norte, Ilocos Sur, Apayao, Abra, La Union, Benguet, Nueva Vizcaya, Quirino, Northern portion of Aurora, Pangasinan	None	None
2	Zambales, Tarlac, Nueva Ecija, Northern portion of Quezon including Polillo Island, Batanes, Southern portion of Aurora	None	None
1	Metro Manila, Bataan, Pampanga, Bulacan, Rizal, Cavite, Laguna, Batangas, Southern portion of Quezon	None	None

The typhoon entered the Philippine Area of Responsibility early on October 16, prompting new and modified warnings for the Luzon coast. There was the expectation that the typhoon would become a super-typhoon and produce as much rain as Typhoon Ketsana in 2009, with the possibility of Magat Dam being filled. As Typhoon Megi neared Luzon, the Philippine National Red Cross established centers for evacuees fleeing the typhoon.

In response to orders from President Benigno Aquino III, PAGASA posted hourly tropical cyclone updates. Inhabitants of the Isabela and Cagayan provinces were advised to bring in their harvests before Megi arrived, while fishermen in the Ilocos region were advised to seek shelter. Late on October 16, PAGASA issued Storm Signal 1 for Cagayan, Isabela, Babuyan and Calayan islands in the northern Philippines, while President Aquino called for cooperation from all concerned government and private sector groups to prevent fatalities.

On October 17, evacuations began with hundreds of people fleeing from Luzon as Megi intensified into a super typhoon and Storm signal number 3 raised. Over 18 provinces had been placed under alert for the typhoon as it approached the Philippines. Later on that day, all state schools and colleges were suspended. PAGASA declared public storm warning number 4 announcing that over 7 million people were liable to be affected. The storm warning was later raised to the highest level over Cagayan and Isabela as tropical storm force winds began blowing throughout Cagayan province.

By October 18, all state schools and colleges in Cagayan, the Ilocos and the Cordilleras were closed for the day in preparation. Isabela province was placed under a state of calamity when the typhoon made landfall and moved further inland.

=== Mainland China ===
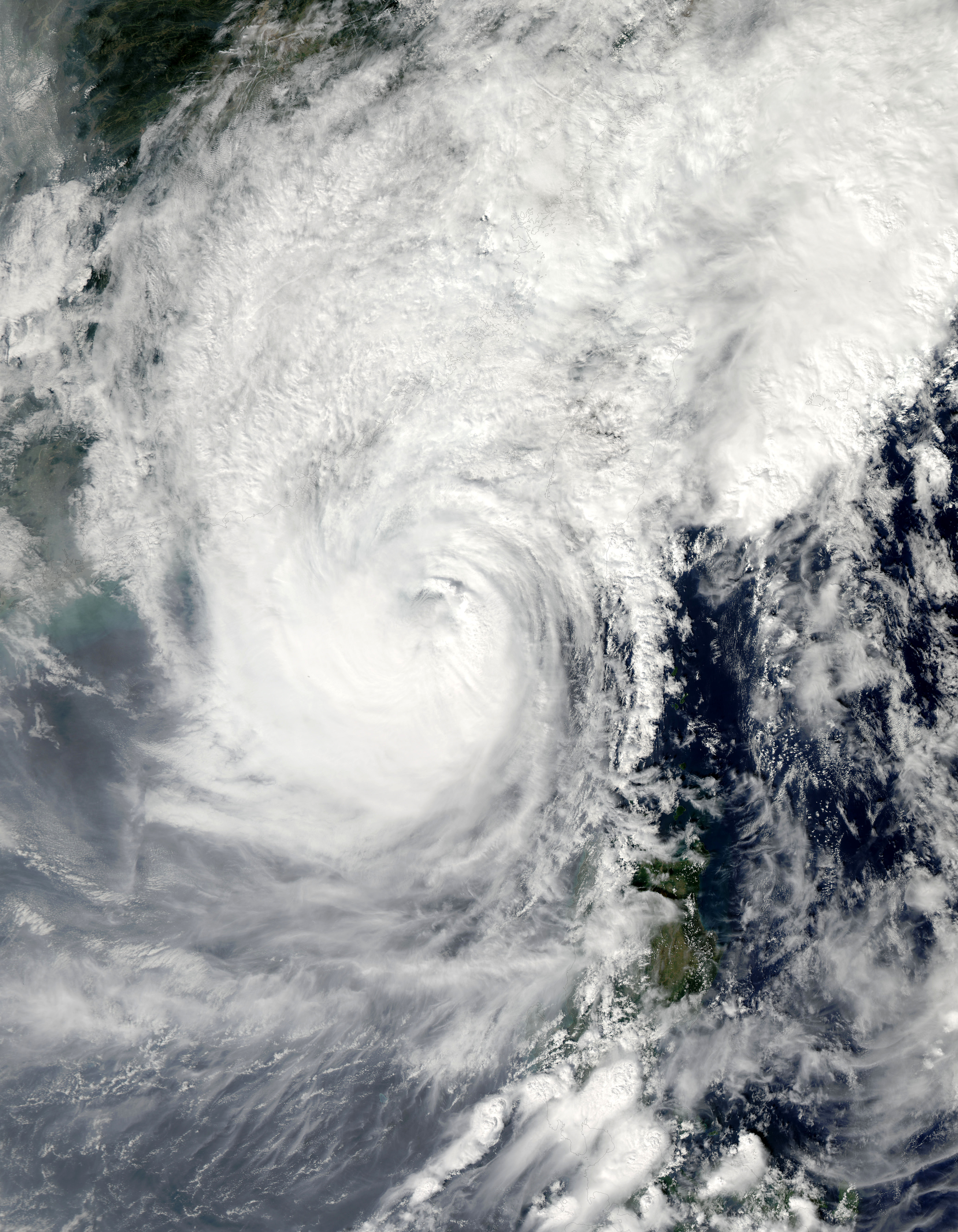
Typhoon Megi approaching China on October 22

China began preparing for Super Typhoon Megi on October 17 by issuing an orange alert to local authorities and advising all vessels to return to port. Evacuation of coastal residents began on October 18 as authorities issued disaster warnings and urgent advice to local officials in Hainan, Guangxi, Guangdong and Fujian provinces to prepare for relief operations. The government ordered all fishing vessels to return to port by midnight on October 19 as Typhoon Megi entered the South China Sea. The following day, China railways suspended all trains in and out of Hainan in preparation for Typhoon Megi. Equipment used in relief operations from heavy rains the previous month were kept in preparation for Typhoon Megi. As the typhoon approached, over 150,000 residents from coastal areas of Fujian province were evacuated and tens of thousands of fishing vessels were ordered to seek shelter in port. Warnings were also issued to prepare for storm surges when the typhoon arrives. Rail services to and from Hainan Island were resumed while tonnes of food and other supplies were brought in for disaster relief.

=== Hong Kong ===
In response to Megi's approach, the Hong Kong Observatory issued Standby Signal No. 1 at 16:35 HKT (08:35 UTC) on October 20. The Government had already informed the Travel Industry council and the Hong Kong International Airport to make plans in case of passengers being stranded at the airport. The Observatory subsequently issued Strong Wind Signal No. 3 at 05:40 HKT (21:40 UTC) on October 21 (October 20 UTC). As of 8:40 pm on October 22 all Signals were cancelled by the Hong Kong Observatory.

=== Macau ===
The Macao Meteorological and Geophysical Bureau (SMG) hoisted the Standby Signal No. 1 at 19:00 HKT(11:00 UTC) on October 19, 2010.

== Impact and aftermath ==
=== Philippines ===
The centre of the storm made landfall near Divalacan Bay, Luzon, at 11:25 am (local time) on October 18 preceded by torrential rain and flash flooding forcing residents of the area to seek shelter. A reported total of 3,687 individuals from the northern Philippines were evacuated to schools, churches, halls and other sturdier structures but over 200,000 people were rendered homeless. Although at little risk of being struck by the departing typhoon, classes throughout Metro Manila were suspended on October 19 as a precaution.

Initial estimates suggested that Philippine rice farmers could lose over 600,000 metric tons of crops as the typhoon swept through some of the biggest agricultural areas, such as Isabela and Cagayan, in the northern Philippines. Official estimates following the passing of the typhoon placed agricultural losses at around US$34 million with tens of thousands of tons of rice and corn lost. Fears of a rice shortage in the next few weeks were allayed by the National Food Authority which announced that sufficient food had been stockpiled.

Megi inflicted substantial damage to much of the infrastructure as it crossed Luzon. Communication infrastructure in Cagayan and Isabela suffered extensive damage during the typhoon with an estimated 90% of regional communications lost. Officials believe that it would take five days to restore them. Electricity in the northern provinces of Cagayan, Kalinga, Apayao, Northern Isabela, the Mountain Province, parts of Benguet, Ilocos Norte, la Union, Nueva Ecija, Aurora, parts of Tuguegarao was disrupted by Megi. The National Grid Corp. announced that eleven towers along one transmission line suffered extensive damage, which also affected power supplies to the capital leading to outages of up to 3 hours.

Many domestic and international flights by carriers such as Cebu Pacific and Philippine Airlines bound for the northern Philippines were cancelled because of the impact of the typhoon, but as the typhoon left the islands, many flights were restored. Many roads in Luzon remained closed through October 18, and bus operators cancelled trips to Cagayan and Isabela due to the poor weather. The departure of Megi left large quantities of debris, as well as unsanitary conditions.

The Philippine Red Cross dispatched a water search and rescue team to Cagayan to aid rescue operations. UNICEF announced that the organisation was monitoring the event and that relief supplies were being prepared should the Philippines Government request aid. The United Nations Office for the Coordination on Humanitarian Affairs have also committed to helping with disaster relief. Reserve military officers, volunteers, and helicopters were on standby in preparation for the storm, with one retired army general describing the operations as "preparing for war". Search and rescue operations for survivors was hampered by winds that were still reaching 210 kilometres (130 mi) throughout the region. According to official reports, the province of Isabela bore the brunt of the storm with the towns of Palanan and Divilacan suffering extensive damage and Maconacon reportedly being completely destroyed.

PAGASA lowered storm signals as the typhoon weakened when it crossed into the mountains in northern Luzon.

Casualties

One person drowned near Tuguegarao, Cagayan during the afternoon of October 18 after being swept away in a river that had overflowed its banks. The body of another man who had drowned in Ilocos Sur province was recovered. Another five people died during the storm: one man after being pinned by a falling tree, a mother and her two children when a tree fell on their house and a fifth when struck by lightning. Three people were killed in Isabela province by a storm surge while another drowned attempting to cross a river in Nueva Ecija province. A further nine people have been injured, some by falling debris. The president made a statement expressing his sympathy and condolences for the bereft families, while also declaring that despite the strength of Megi, the loss of life was significantly less than during Typhoon Basyang and Tropical Storm Ondoy. As of October 20, the death toll stood at 19.

Juan became the second super typhoon to hit the area, 21 years after the first such storm, Super Typhoon Tasing of 1989.

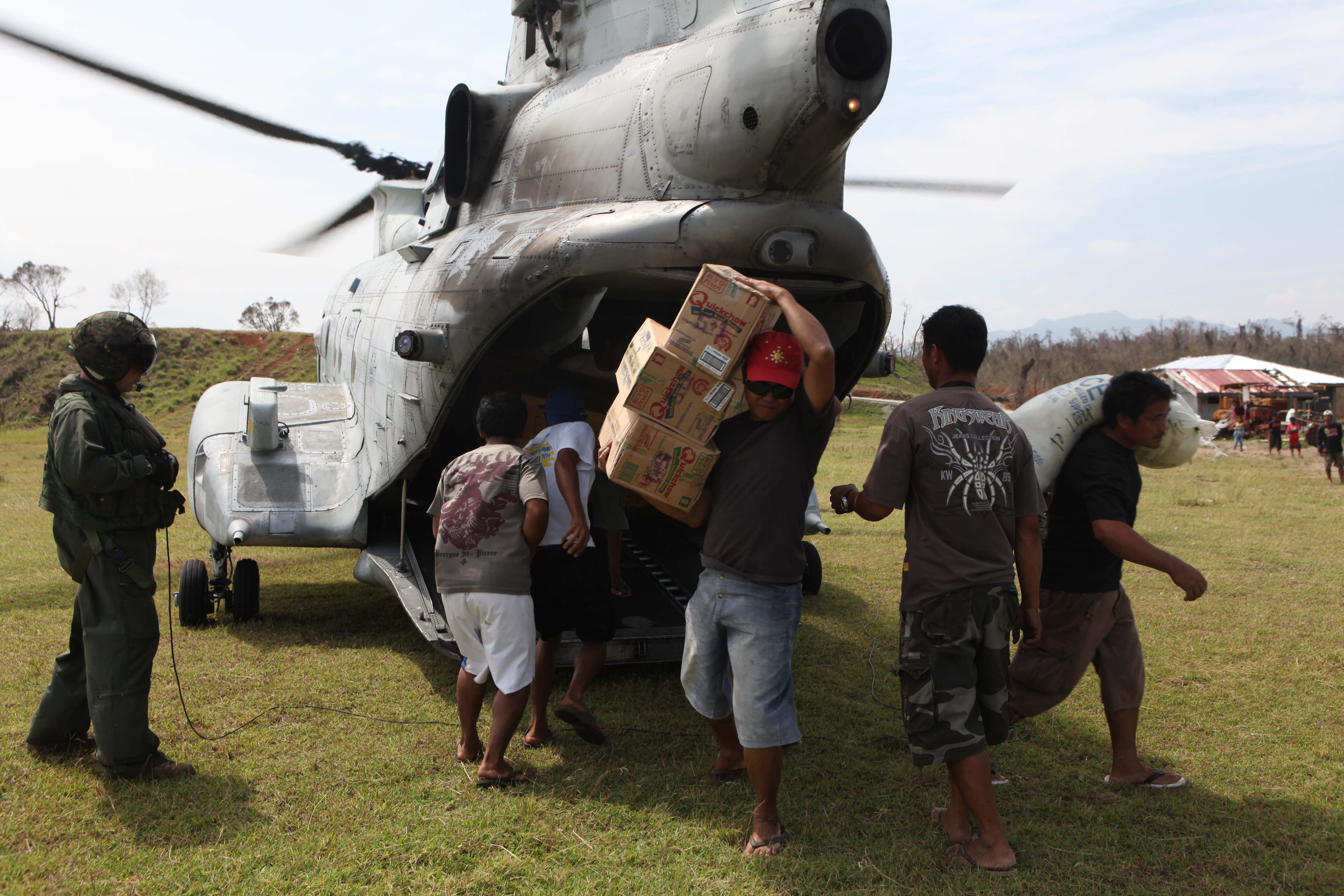
Victims of Typhoon Megi unload humanitarian aid supplies from a U.S. Marine Corps helicopter in Isabela, Philippines.

Relief efforts

Child United, a Seattle-based non-profit which provides disaster relief in Asia, was on standby to provide assistance to families left homeless by the typhoon. Their relief operation began October 18 in the Philippines, with supplies already in-country being prepared for immediate delivery to the disaster site, and additional supplies prepared for shipment from the United States. The organization collected monetary donations to assist in further disaster relief, as well as donations of towels, sheets, toiletries (shampoo, toothpaste, etc.) and canned goods.

The USS Essex Expeditionary Strike Group (ESG) provided disaster relief in the aftermath. The ESG was composed of the USS Essex (LHD 2), USS Denver (LPD 9) and USS Harpers Ferry (LSD 49). Amphibious Squadron 11 and the 31st Marine Expeditionary Unit with Marine Medium Helicopter Squadron 262 (HMM-262) were embarked with the ESG. Marine Medium Helicopter Squadron 265 (HMM-265) also provided disaster relief. The unit was ashore at Clark International Airport participating in an exercise when the typhoon hit. Their mission changed from participation in the exercise to disaster relief.

Juan as a typhoon name was retired by PAGASA, and replaced with Jose, as the typhoon reached the damage cost threshold of ₱1 billion. However, Jose has also been retired and replaced by Josie as it too caused in excess of ₱1 billion worth of damage.

=== Taiwan ===
Throughout Yilan County, torrential rainfall from Typhoon Megi and the northeast monsoon, peaking at 1,182 mm (46.5 in) in Suao, triggered widespread flash flooding and landslides. According to the Central Weather Bureau, a record 939 mm (37.0 in) of rain fell in a 24‑hour span between October 20 and 21. This surpassed the previous record set by Typhoon Morakot in August 2009, just over a year prior. In Suao, a record 181.55 mm (7.148 in) of rain fell within an hour, triggering some of the worst flash flooding in the area in over 20 years. Megi also brought much rainfall in Hualien, Taitung, Pingtung, Taipei, Keelung, and New Taipei. At least 12 people have been confirmed dead and 23 others are missing. Early damage estimates placed losses to agriculture at NT$45 million (US$1.5 million). Later reports on October 22 indicated that seven people were killed when the temple they were sheltering in was buried by a landslide. Near Suao, multiple landslides struck a major highway stranding more than 400 people. Torrential rainfall caused a 500 m (1,600 ft) section of a nearby mountain to collapse, burying a bus carrying 19 people, whom officials fear may have all perished. Air force helicopters have been called in to aid in the search for the bus and any survivors.

By the morning of October 24, 13 fatalities had been confirmed and 25 people were reported missing. After more than ten days of search-and-rescue operations, all missing persons across the island were declared legally deceased.

=== Mainland China ===
After brushing Taiwan, Typhoon Megi struck southern China as a severe tropical storm. Throughout Fujian Province, an estimated 729,800 people were affected by the storm. A total of 36,050 hectares of crops and 530 houses were destroyed by the storm with overall losses incurred in Fujian Province reaching 2.8 billion yuan (US$411.7 million).

== Retirement ==
Owing to the destruction and damages it caused around the Philippines, the name Juan was retired from the Philippine tropical cyclone naming lists by PAGASA. It was replaced by Jose, which was first used (and only once) in the 2014 season. The name Megi, however, was not retired despite making landfall as a powerful typhoon, though would be later retired in 2022 after this storm.

== See also ==
- Other tropical cyclones named Megi
- Other tropical cyclones named Juan
- List of the most intense tropical cyclones
- Typhoons in the Philippines
- Typhoon Angela (Rosing, 1995) — made landfall in the Philippines, most especially Metro Manila, as a powerful typhoon
- Typhoon Haima (Lawin; 2016) — affected the same areas in the same period six years later
- Typhoon Mangkhut (Ompong; 2018) — made landfall in the aforementioned areas as a powerful large typhoon, wrecking extensive damage
