= Typhoon Mangkhut =

Pacific typhoon in 2018

Typhoon Mangkhut (Ompong)
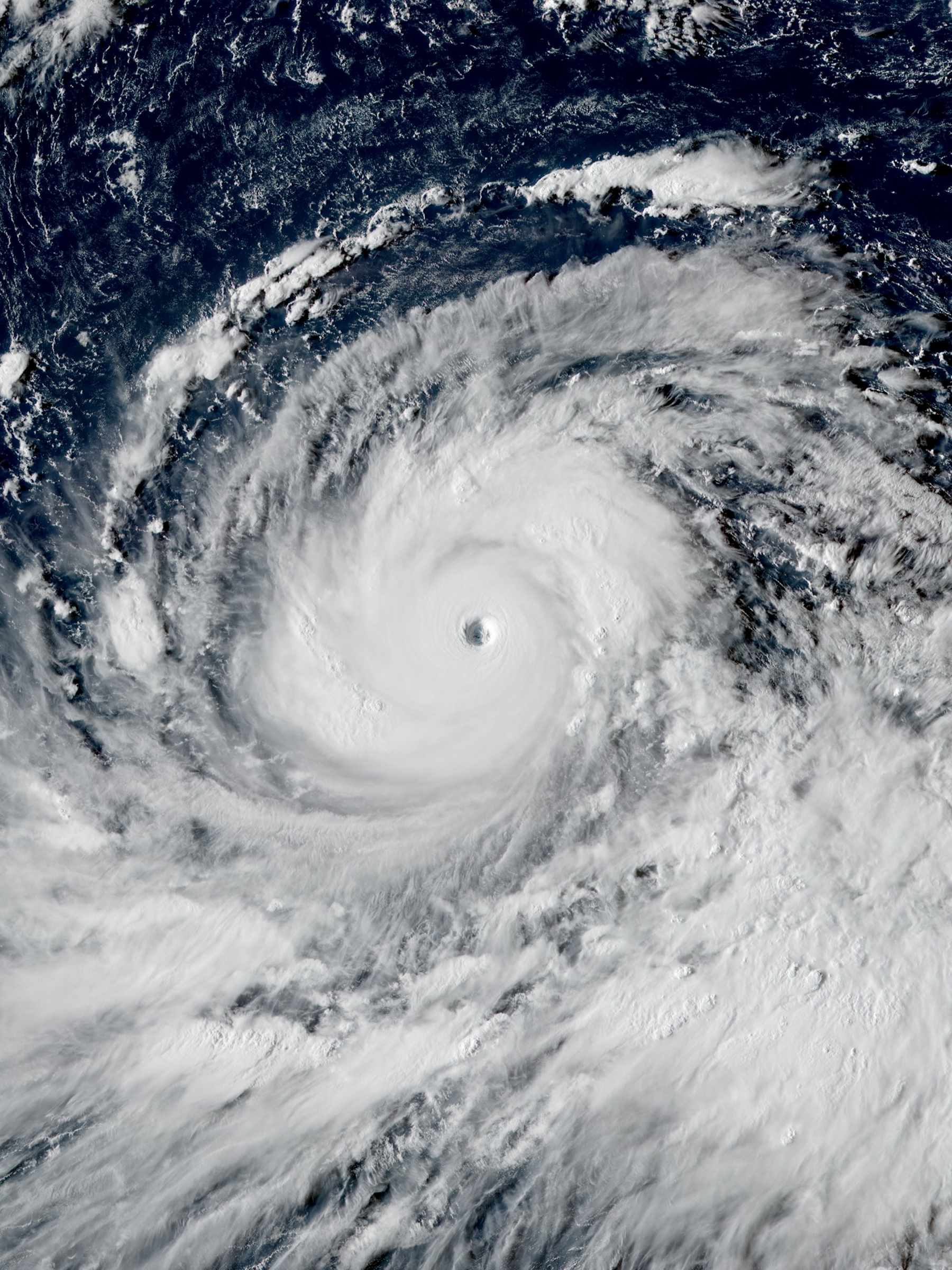
- Typhoon Mangkhut at its peak intensity while approaching the Philippines on September 12

Meteorological history
- Formed: September 6, 2018
- Dissipated: September 17, 2018

Violent typhoon
- 10-minute sustained (JMA)
- Highest winds: 205 km/h (125 mph)
- Lowest pressure: 905 hPa (mbar); 26.72 inHg

Category 5-equivalent super typhoon
- 1-minute sustained (SSHWS/JTWC)
- Highest winds: 285 km/h (180 mph)
- Lowest pressure: 896 hPa (mbar); 26.46 inHg

Overall effects
- Fatalities: 134 total
- Damage: $3.77 billion (2018 USD)
- Areas affected: Mariana Islands; Philippines; Taiwan; South China
- IBTrACS
- Part of the 2018 Pacific typhoon season

Typhoon Mangkhut, (Note: The name Mangkhut (Thai: มังคุด, [maŋ˧ kʰut̚˦˥]) was contributed by Thailand and means mangosteen (Garcinia mangostana) in Thai.) known in the Philippines as Typhoon Ompong, was an extremely powerful and catastrophic tropical cyclone that caused extensive damage in Guam, the Philippines, and South China in mid-September 2018. It was the strongest typhoon to strike Luzon since Megi in 2010, and the strongest to make landfall in the Philippines since Meranti in 2016. Mangkhut was also the strongest typhoon to affect Hong Kong since Ellen in 1983.

Mangkhut was the thirty-second tropical depression, twenty-second tropical storm, ninth typhoon, and fourth super typhoon of the 2018 Pacific typhoon season. It made landfall in Baggao, Cagayan late on September 14, as a Category 5-equivalent super typhoon, and subsequently impacted Hong Kong and southern China. Mangkhut was also the third-strongest tropical cyclone worldwide in 2018.

Over the course of its existence, Mangkhut left behind a trail of severe destruction in its wake. The storm caused a total of $3.77 billion (2018 US) in damage across multiple nations, along with at least 134 fatalities: 127 in the Philippines, six in mainland China, and one in Taiwan. Following the season, both names were retired from their respective naming lists due to the destruction and loss of life it caused. They were replaced with Krathon and Obet.

== Meteorological history ==
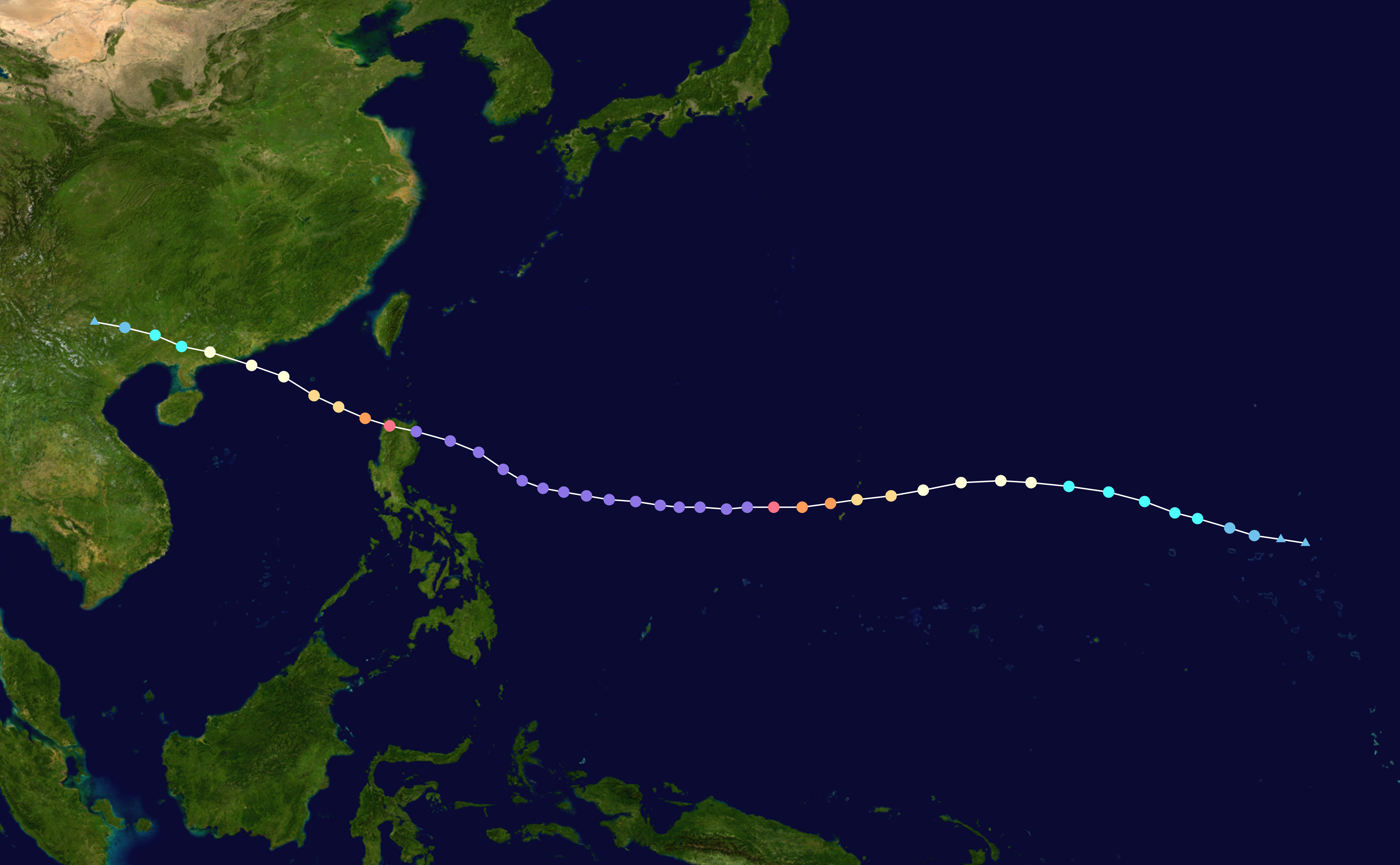
Map plotting the storm's track and intensity, according to the Saffir–Simpson scale Map key Saffir–Simpson scale Tropical depression (≤38 mph, ≤62 km/h) Tropical storm (39–73 mph, 63–118 km/h) Category 1 (74–95 mph, 119–153 km/h) Category 2 (96–110 mph, 154–177 km/h) Category 3 (111–129 mph, 178–208 km/h) Category 4 (130–156 mph, 209–251 km/h) Category 5 (≥157 mph, ≥252 km/h) Unknown Storm type Tropical cyclone Subtropical cyclone Extratropical cyclone, remnant low, tropical disturbance, or monsoon depression

On September 5, 2018, the Joint Typhoon Warning Center (JTWC) began monitoring a tropical disturbance near the International Date Line. Steady development ensued over the following days, and the system organized into a tropical depression on September 6, though operationally, the Japan Meteorological Agency (JMA) did not classify the system as a tropical depression until September 7. The depression soon intensified into a tropical storm, upon which it received the name Mangkhut. Throughout the next two days, the system underwent rapid intensification. Tight banding features wrapped around a developing eye feature. Favorable environmental conditions hastened Mangkhut's development, including low wind shear, ample outflow aloft, high sea surface temperatures, and high ocean heat content. Mangkhut achieved typhoon strength on September 9. A well-defined 18 km (11 mi) eye became evident on satellite imagery as the typhoon approached the Northern Mariana Islands and Guam. The JTWC analyzed Mangkhut as a Category 2-equivalent typhoon with one-minute sustained winds of 165 km/h (103 mph) as it tracked near Rota, around 12:00 UTC on September 10. The JMA assessed the storm's ten-minute sustained winds to be 155 km/h (96 mph) at this time.

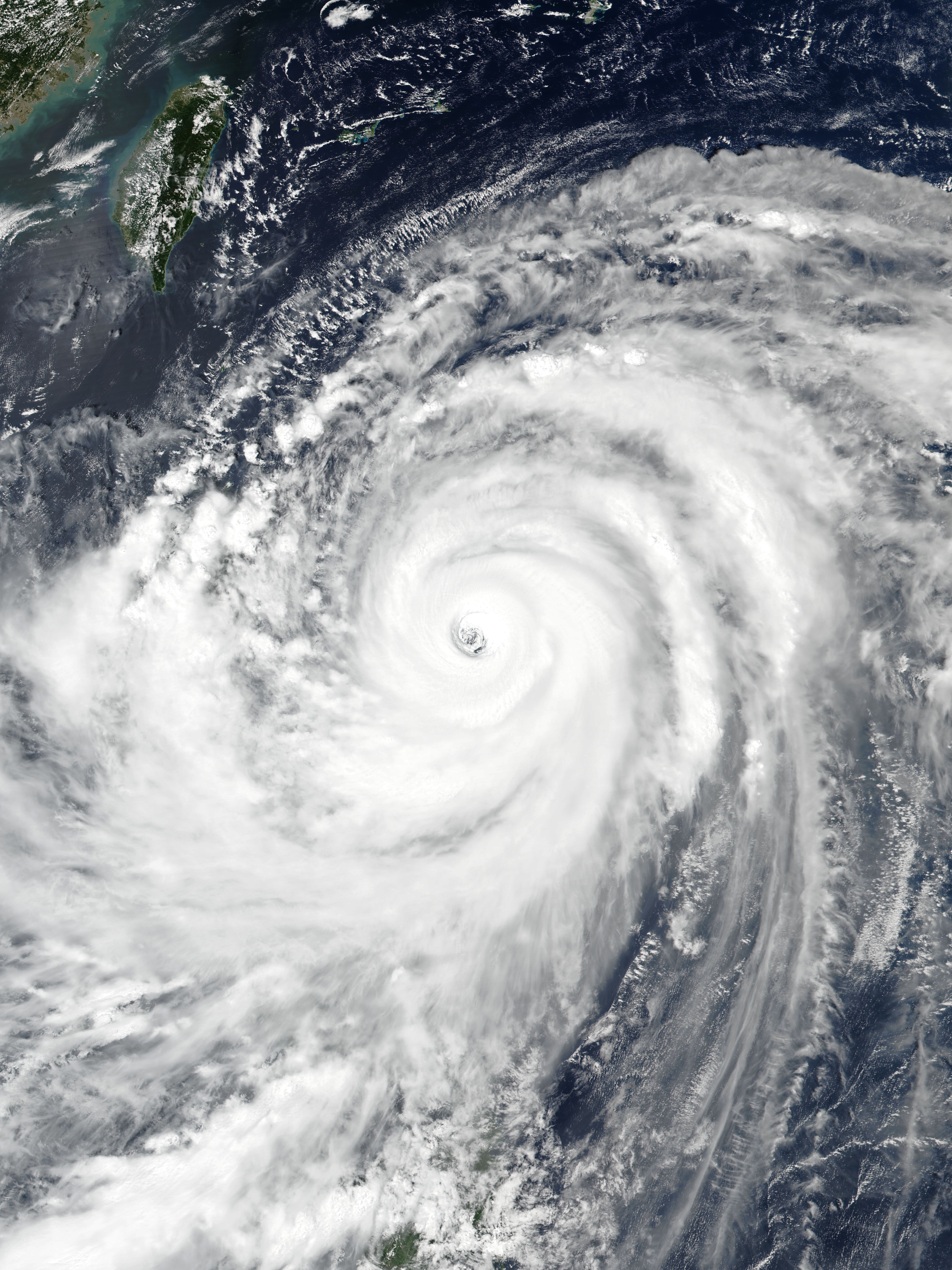
Typhoon Mangkhut approaching Luzon, Philippines on September 14

Substantial intensification ensued on September 11, as Mangkhut traversed the Philippine Sea. A second bout of rapid intensification took place as the storm consolidated significantly; a well-defined 39 km (24 mi) eye became established during this time. The JTWC analyzed Mangkhut to have reached Category 5-equivalent intensity by 06:00 UTC, an intensity it would maintain for nearly four days. The JMA assessed that the typhoon's central pressure bottomed out at 18:00 UTC, with 10-minute sustained winds of 205 km/h (125 mph) and a central minimum pressure of 905 hPa (mbar; 26.73 inHg). The JTWC noted additional strengthening on September 12, and assessed Mangkhut to have reached its peak intensity at 18:00 UTC, with one-minute sustained winds of 285 km/h (175 mph). The typhoon made landfall in Baggao, Cagayan at 2:00 a.m. PST on September 15 (18:00 UTC on September 14), as a Category 5-equivalent super typhoon, with 10-minute sustained winds of 205 km/h (125 mph) and 1-minute sustained winds of 260 km/h (160 mph). This made Mangkhut the strongest storm to strike the island of Luzon since Typhoon Megi in 2010, and the strongest nationwide since Typhoon Haiyan in 2013.

Traversing the mountains of Luzon weakened Mangkhut before it emerged over the South China Sea on September 15. The typhoon subsequently made landfall again on the Taishan coast of Jiangmen, Guangdong, China, at 5 p.m. Beijing Time (09:00 UTC) on September 16, with two-minute sustained winds of 45 m/s (160 km/h) according to China Meteorological Administration. Following landfall, Mangkhut quickly weakened while moving westward. Late on September 17, Mangkhut dissipated over Guangxi, China.

== Preparations ==
=== Philippines ===
==== Highest Tropical Cyclone Warning Signal ====
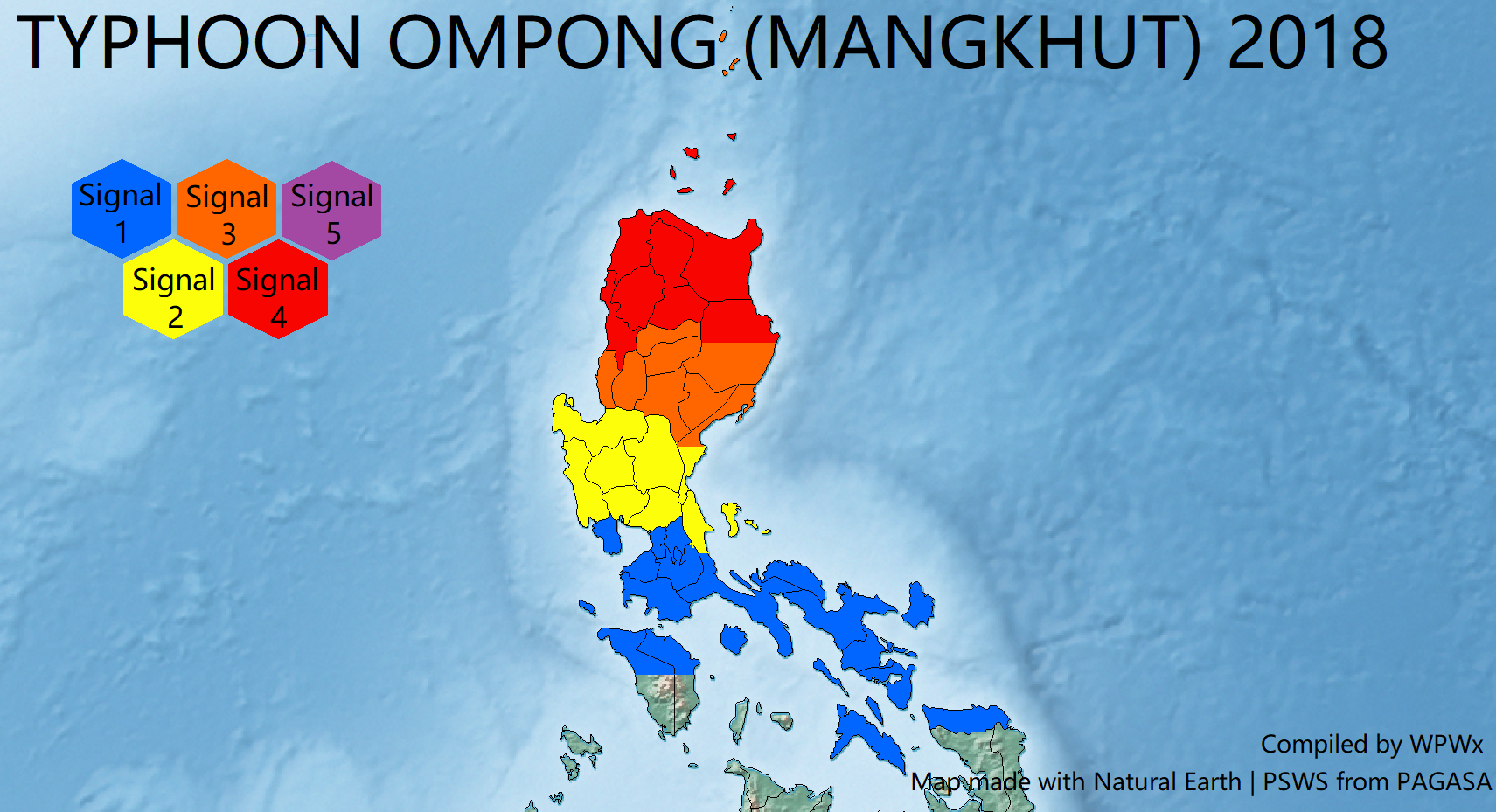
A map of the highest Tropical Cyclone Warning Signals raised throughout the Philippines in relation to Mangkhut's passage

TCWS#	Luzon	Visayas	Mindanao
4	Ilocos Norte, Ilocos Sur, Cagayan, Northern Portion of Isabela, Abra, Apayao, Kalinga, Babuyan Islands	None	None
3	Batanes, Rest of Isabela, La Union, Mountain Province, Benguet, Ifugao, Nueva Vizcaya, Quirino, Northern Portion of Aurora	None	None
2	Pangasinan, Tarlac, Nueva Ecija, Rest of Aurora, Southern Aurora, Zambales, Pampanga, Bulacan, Northern Quezon, Polillo Islands	None	None
1	Bataan, Rizal, Metro Manila, Cavite, Batangas, Laguna, Rest of Quezon, Lubang Island, Marinduque, Northern Portion of Occidental Mindoro, Northern Portion of Oriental Mindoro, Camarines Norte, Camarines Sur, Catanduanes, Albay, Sorsogon, Masbate, Burias Island, Ticao Island	Northern Samar	None

Tropical cyclone warning signals were hoisted by the Philippine Atmospheric, Geophysical and Astronomical Services Administration as early as September 13. Preemptive and forced evacuations were implemented, especially in the Ilocos, Cagayan Valley and Cordillera administrative regions, the three regions widely expected to be severely affected by Mangkhut (Ompong). School class suspensions were announced as early as September 12 in preparation for the approaching typhoon. Medical and emergency response teams were placed on standby, and ₱1,700,000,000 worth of relief goods were prepared by September 13.

=== Hong Kong ===
On September 12, as Mangkhut was forecast to severely threaten Hong Kong, the Hong Kong Government convened an inter-departmental meeting to discuss possible responses to the storm.

On September 14, the Hong Kong Government held a rare cross-department press conference over the preparation for Mangkhut, reminding Hong Kong citizens to "prepare for the worst". That night, the Hong Kong Observatory issued the Standby Signal No. 1 when Mangkhut was 1,110 kilometres (600 nmi) away from Hong Kong, the farthest distance on record.

On September 15, citizens living in Tai O and Lei Yue Mun were evacuated from these low-lying areas that have historically been very prone to storm surge. The Hong Kong Observatory issued the Strong Wind Signal No. 3 in the afternoon.

On September 16, as Mangkhut maintained its course towards the Pearl River Estuary, the Hong Kong Observatory issued the Gale or Storm Signal No. 8 during midnight. After dawn, as local winds rapidly strengthened, Hong Kong Observatory issued the Increasing Gale or Storm Signal No. 9. At 9:40 a.m., the Hong Kong Observatory issued the Hurricane Signal No. 10, the highest level of tropical cyclone warning signals in Hong Kong. This marked only the third time that this warning has been issued for the region since 1999, the others being with Typhoon Hato in 2017 and Typhoon Vicente in 2012. The signal was held for ten hours, the second longest duration ever, only behind the eleven hours during Typhoon York in 1999. The typhoon passed 100 kilometers south of Hong Kong at its closest, the joint second farthest for a Hurricane Signal No. 10, with Typhoon Vicente only behind 2025's Typhoon Ragasa.

=== Mainland China ===
On September 15, the meteorological bureaus of most cities in Guangdong issued red alerts for Typhoon Mangkhut, which is the highest level of alerts in Guangdong. The Guangxi Meteorological Bureau also issued a red alert for the typhoon at 5:00 p.m. Beijing Time. On the next day, the Meteorological Bureau of Shenzhen Municipality issued a red alert for rainstorm, which is the highest level of alerts in Shenzhen.

The Fujian Meteorological Bureau issued an orange alert for the typhoon, the second-highest alert level, on September 15.

On September 16, National Meteorological Center of CMA renewed a red alert for Typhoon Mangkhut, which is the highest level of alerts in China. On the same day, the Hainan Meteorological Bureau issued an orange alert for the typhoon. In Guangdong's provincial capital Guangzhou, schools, public transportation, and businesses were closed across the entire city for the first time since 1978.

== Impact ==
=== Guam and the Northern Mariana Islands ===
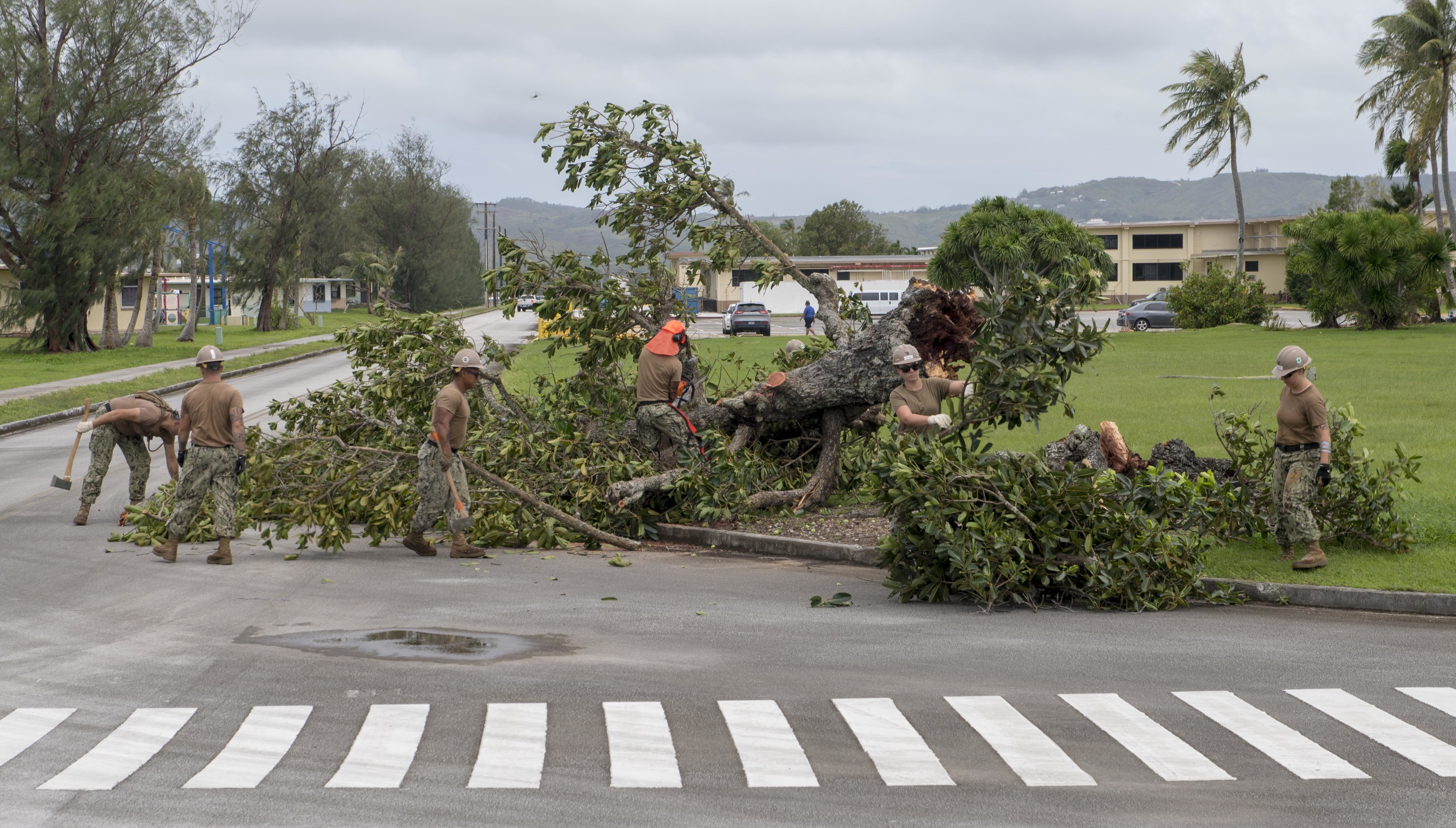
Sailors remove debris in Guam following Typhoon Mangkhut

After the center of Mangkhut passed near Guam, about 80% of the island lost electricity. The typhoon caused $4.3 million in infrastructural damage in Guam.

=== Philippines ===
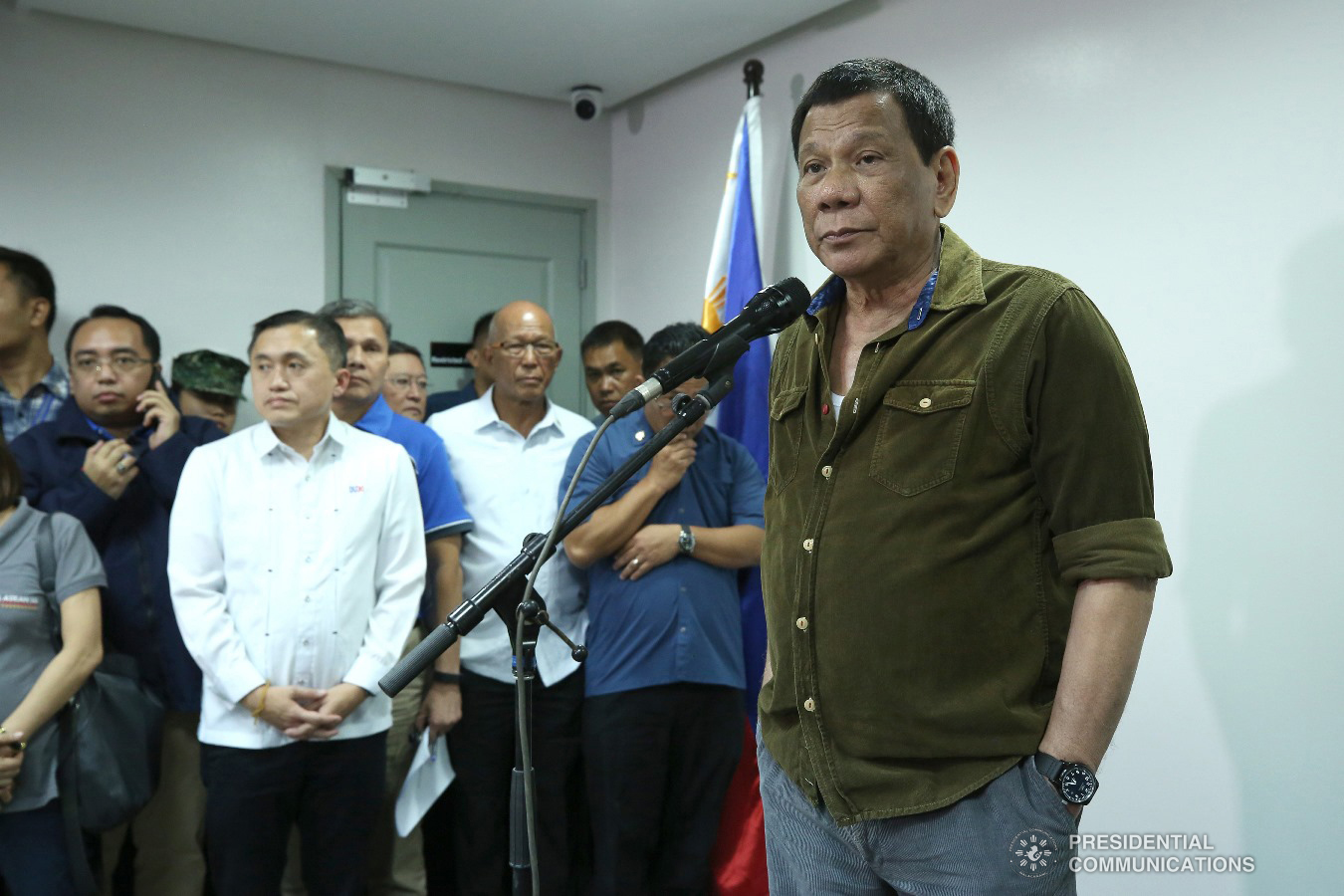
President Rodrigo Duterte presides over a command conference with the members of his cabinet at the NDRRMC office in Camp Aguinaldo, Quezon City on September 13, 2018.

Mangkhut making landfall over Baggao, Cagayan in Luzon on September 14

After sweeping through Luzon, it left a trail of destruction. Almost all buildings in Tuguegarao, Cagayan's provincial capital experienced some sort of damage due to the typhoon. The typhoon blew away roofs, uprooted trees, destroyed buildings, and blocked roads with debris. Shards of glass was blown through the corridors in a hotel in Santa Ana. In Manila, extreme rains caused widespread flooding in urban areas. A tornado was reported in Marikina, eastern Metro Manila, at around 5:30 p.m. Philippine Standard Time on September 14, injuring two people. Over 105,000 families evacuated from their homes, and several airports in northern Luzon closed and airlines cancelled their flights until September 16.

On September 22, police confirmed that the typhoon had caused at least 127 fatalities; eighty deaths occurred in the collapse of a small mine in the town of Itogon, Benguet, where dozens of landslides buried homes. Philippine police also stated that another 111 people remained missing, as of September 22.

Costliest Philippine typhoons
Rank	Storm	Season	Damage		Ref.
Rank	Storm	Season	PHP	USD	Ref.
1	Yolanda (Haiyan)	2013	₱95.5 billion	$2.98 billion	
2	Odette (Rai)	2021	₱51.7 billion	$968 million	
3	Glenda (Rammasun)	2014	₱38.6 billion	$771 million	
4	Pablo (Bopha)	2012	₱36.9 billion	$724 million	
5	Ompong (Mangkhut)	2018	₱33.9 billion	$627 million	
6	Pepeng (Parma)	2009	₱27.3 billion	$591 million	
7	Ulysses (Vamco)	2020	₱20.2 billion	$420 million	
8	Crising (Wipha)	2025	₱18.4 billion	$373 million	
9	Kristine (Trami)	2024	₱18.4 billion	$373 million	
10	Rolly (Goni)	2020	₱17.9 billion	$371 million	

Francis Tolentino, a political adviser of President Rodrigo Duterte, announced that an estimated 5.7 million people nationwide had been affected by the storm. Luzon suffered extensive losses which more than doubled the expected worst-case scenario outlined by Agriculture Secretary Emmanuel Piñol.

As of October 5, the NDRRMC estimated that Mangkhut caused PHP33.9 billion (US$626.8 million) in damages in the Philippines, with assessments continuing.

=== Malaysia ===
The tail winds from Mangkhut also affected some parts of Malaysia (as well as state of Sabah).

=== Taiwan ===
A thirty-year-old female teacher visiting Fenniaolin Beach in Yilan County was swept out to sea by a wave. Her body was recovered two days later.

=== Hong Kong ===
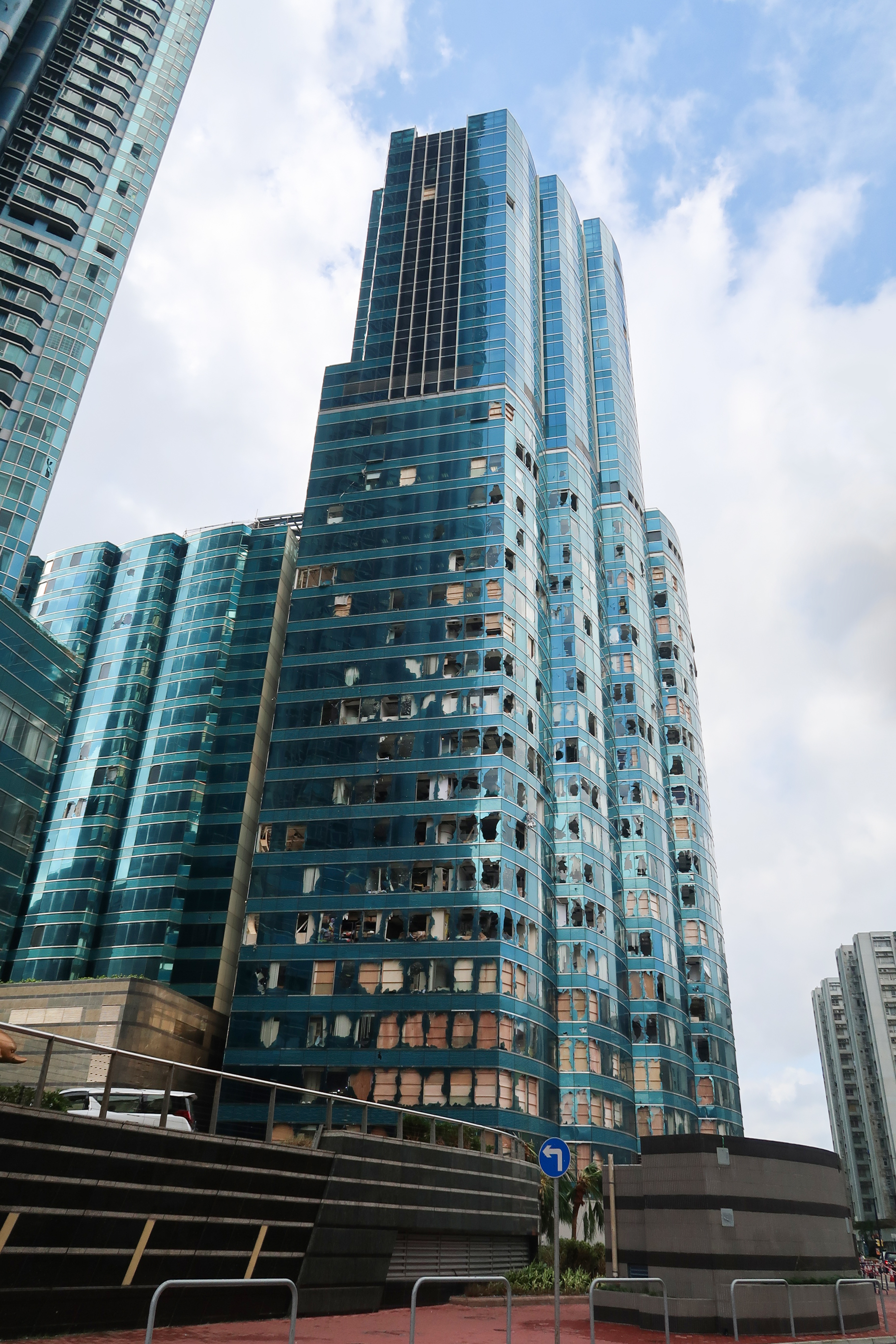
Shattered windows at Two Harbourfront in Hung Hom, Hong Kong

Mangkhut was the most intense typhoon to strike Hong Kong since Typhoon Ellen in 1983; the highest typhoon warning signal No. 10 remained in place for ten hours. An hourly mean wind of 81 km/h (50 mph) and gusts up to 169 km/h (105 mph) were recorded at the Hong Kong Observatory in Tsim Sha Tsui, while on Cheung Chau island these figures reached 157 (98) and 212 km/h (132 mph) respectively. The strongest winds in Hong Kong near sea level were recorded at the remote Waglan Island, with ten-minute sustained winds of 180 km/h (110 mph) gusting up to 220 km/h (137 mph). These winds caused the territory's many skyscrapers to sway and shattered glass windows; notably, the curtain walls of the Harbour Grand Kowloon were blown out by the winds. A construction elevator shaft on a high-rise under construction in Tai Kok Tsui collapsed onto an adjacent building, which had to be evacuated by police. Many roads were blocked by fallen trees and other debris, including major arteries such as Lockhart Road in Wan Chai and Kam Sheung Road, and service on the Mass Transit Railway (MTR) was halted on all above-ground sections of track.

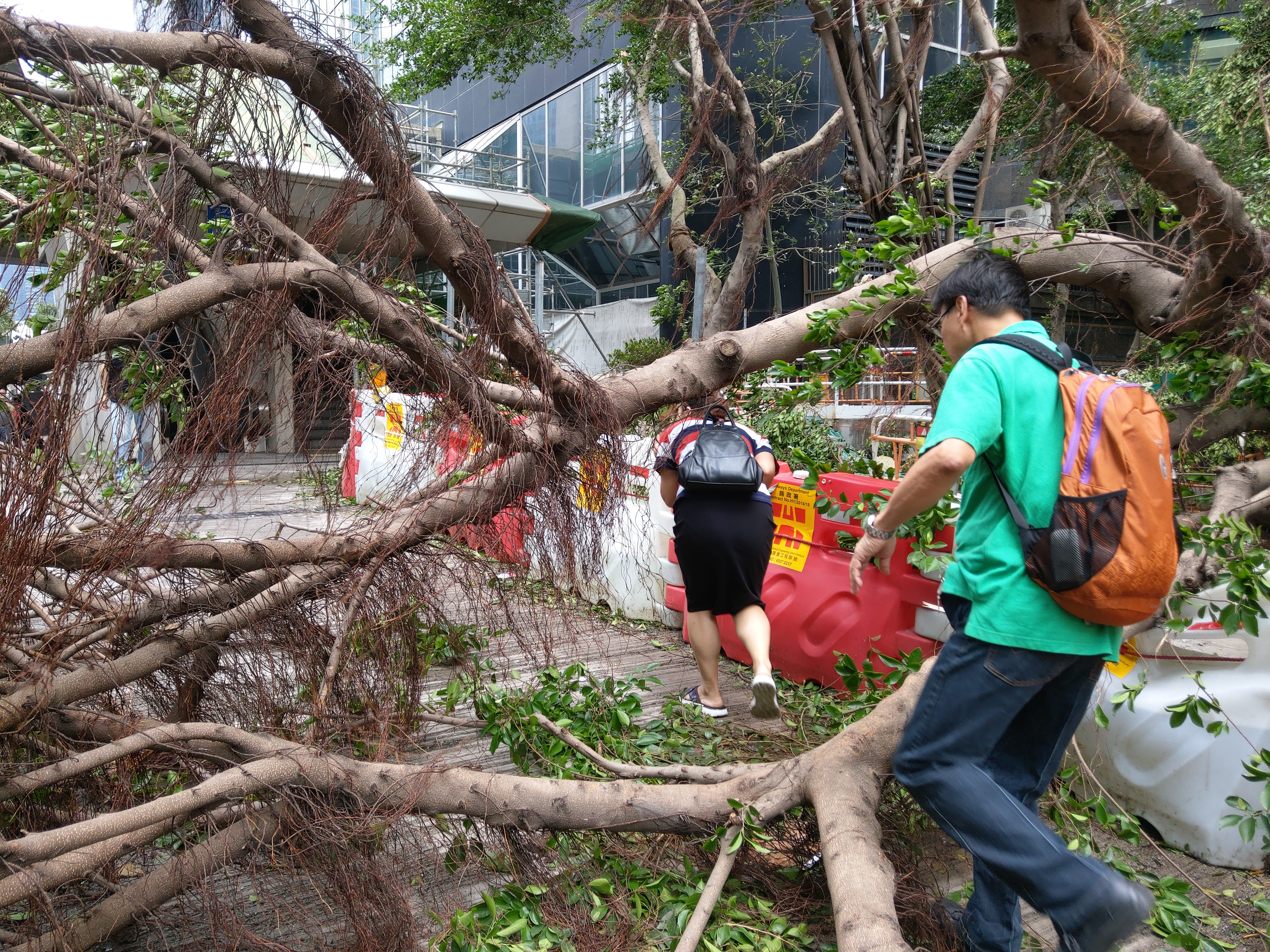
People climb over trees to go to work the morning after Typhoon Mangkhut near Immigration Tower in Wan Chai

Serious flooding was reported in many seaside residential areas, including Heng Fa Chuen, Tseung Kwan O South, Shek O, Lei Yue Mun, villages in Tuen Mun and the fishing village of Tai O, due to a powerful storm surge of up to 3.38 metres (11.1 ft).

In Sai Kung, multiple yachts and boats were sunk with one in particular pushed by the storm and beached next to a pedestrian promenade. Strings of seafront fence blocks were wrecked by the power of the waves. A sewage treatment plant was damaged. Animals were left stranded in the ocean.

About 1,219 people sought refuge in emergency shelters opened by the Home Affairs Department. The Hong Kong International Airport cancelled and delayed a total of 889 international flights. More than 200 people were injured, but no fatalities were reported. Due to the substantial damage and disruption caused by the typhoon, the Education Bureau announced that all schools would be closed on September 17 and 18. Insurance claims in Hong Kong amounted to HK$7.3 billion (US$930 million).

The day after the storm, massive crowds filled the territory's MTR system, which operated at a reduced level of service on some lines as some sections of the tracks had been blocked by debris. Most of the city's 600 bus routes also went out of service due to blocked roads.

=== Macau ===
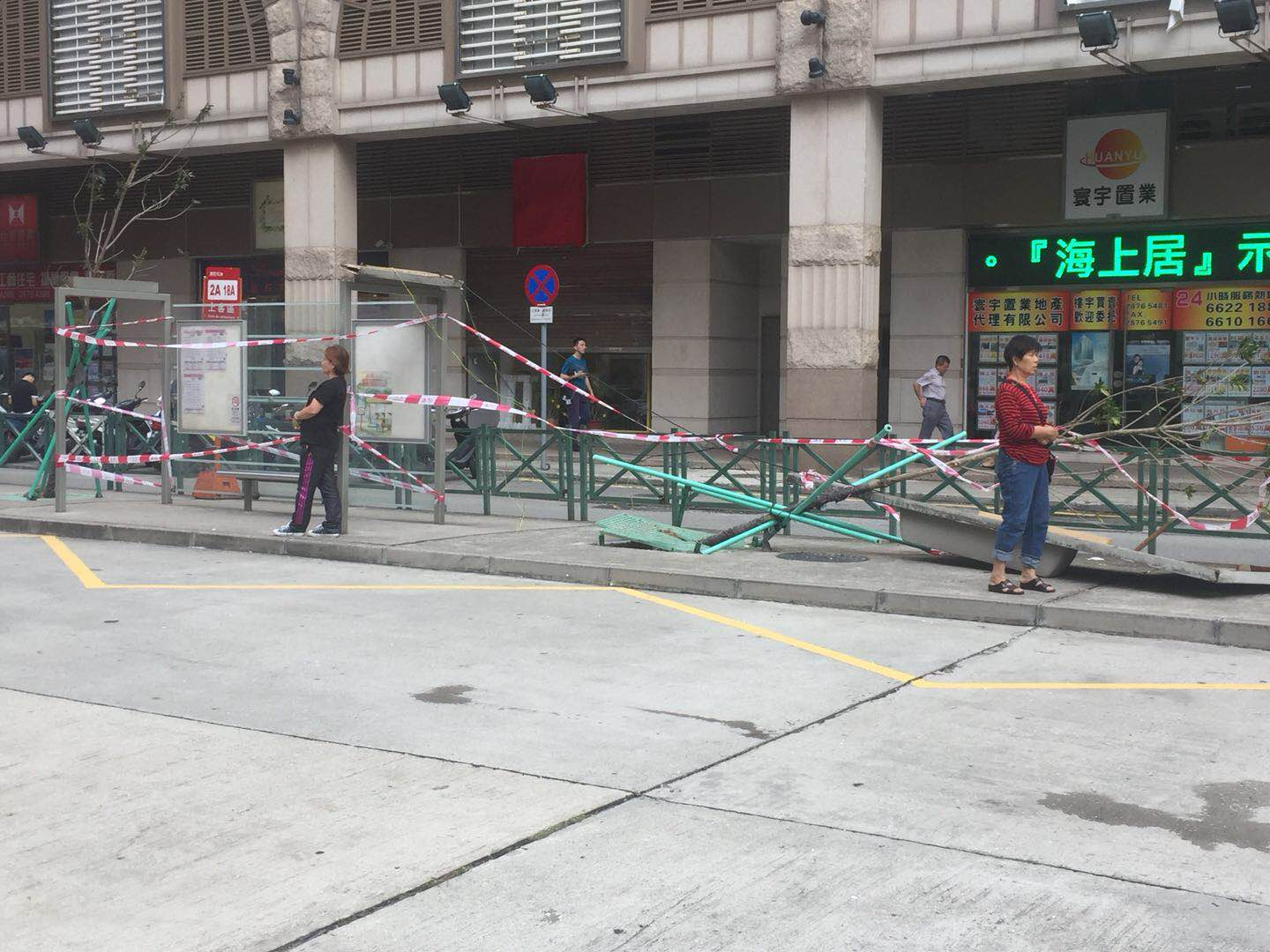
The ceiling of the Oriental Pearl Terminal Station waiting area was blown away by strong winds from Mangkhut.

A storm surge of up to 1.9 metres (6 ft 3 in) affected Macau. About 21,000 homes lost power and 7,000 homes lost internet access, and forty people were injured. For the first time in history, all casinos in Macau were closed. The Macau International Airport cancelled 191 flights on Saturday and Sunday (September 15 and 16). Total damage in Macau was estimated to be 1.74 billion patacas (US$215 million). 40 injuries were reported and more than 5,500 people were evacuated.

=== Mainland China ===
Typhoon Mangkhut in northwestern Shenzhen

Typhoon Mangkhut caused the evacuation of over 2.45 million people. In Shenzhen, the storm caused power failures in thirteen locations, flooded the Seafood Street, and caused 248 tree falls. Transport was shut down in Southern China, and at least four people in Guangdong were killed in the typhoon. In Guangzhou, markets, schools and public transport were closed or limited in the wake of the storm on Monday, September 17, and residents were requested to minimize non-essential travel. Ferry services from Zhuhai's Jiuzhougang Port to Shenzhen and Hong Kong were suspended indefinitely. The Civil Air Defense Office of Guangzhou Municipality (Municipal Civil Air Defense Office) cancelled the annual air-raid drills scheduled for September 15 to avoid causing panic as Typhoon Mangkhut approached. Schools in Beihai, Qinzhou, Fangchenggang, and Nanning were closed on September 17. The trains to Guangxi were also closed on September 17.

In total, the storm killed six people and caused CN¥13.68 billion (US$1.99 billion) in damage.

== Retirement ==
Due to its catastrophic damage and high death toll in Luzon, the PAGASA retired the name Ompong from their tropical cyclone naming lists and will never be used again as a typhoon name within the Philippine Area of Responsibility (PAR). It was replaced with Obet in 2019 and it was first used in 2022 season.

The name Mangkhut was also officially retired during the 51st annual session of the ESCAP/WMO Typhoon Committee from rotating typhoon lists in February 2019. In July 2020, the Typhoon Committee subsequently chose Krathon as its replacement name, but it was first (and only) used in 2024 Season.

== See also ==
- Weather of 2018
- Tropical cyclones in 2018
- Typhoons in the Philippines
- Typhoon Peggy
