= Divilacan =

Municipality in Isabela, Philippines

- Municipality
- Municipality of Divilacan
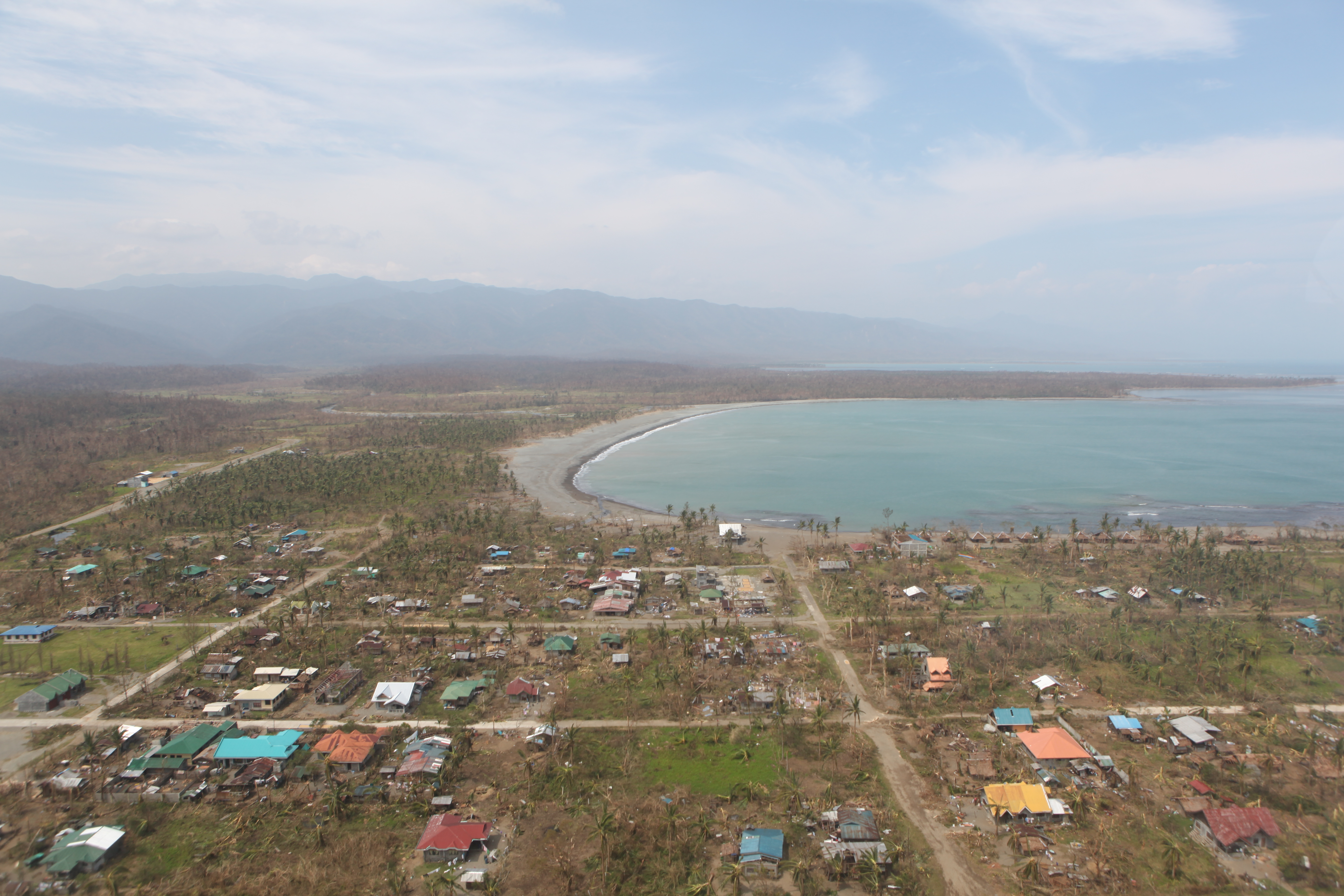
- Aerial view of Divilacan after Typhoon Megi (Juan) in October 2010

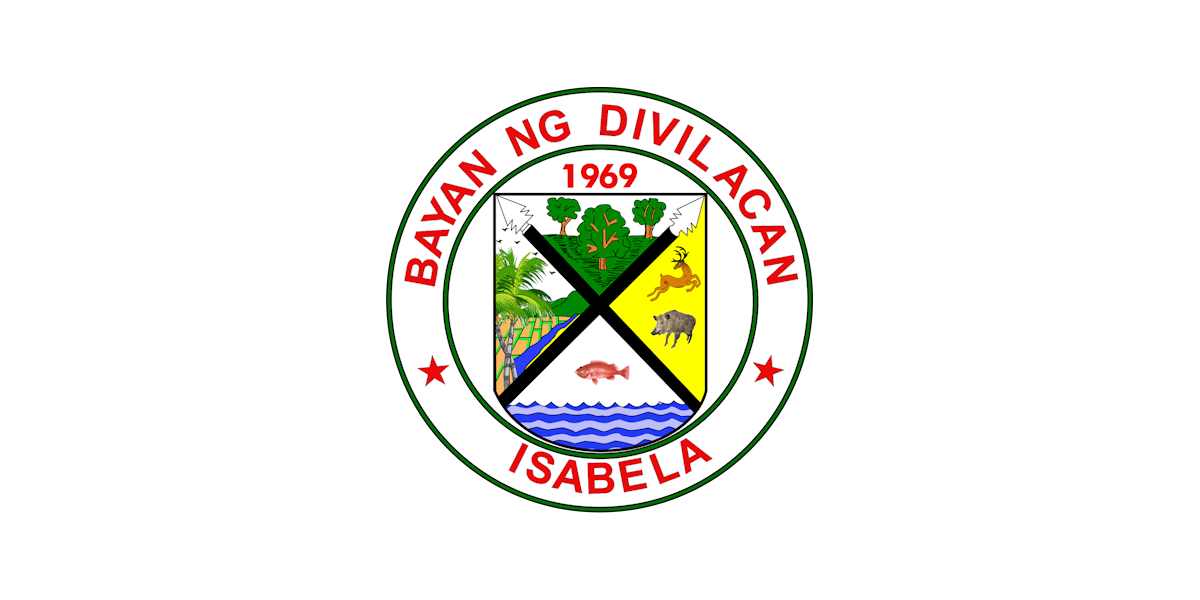
- Flag Seal

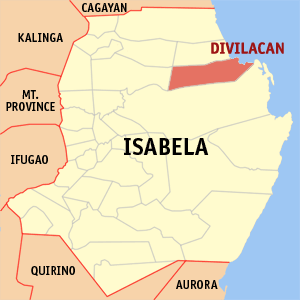
- Map of Isabela with Divilacan highlighted
- Interactive map of Divilacan
- Location within the Philippines
- Coordinates: 17°20′N 122°18′E
- Country: Philippines
- Region: Cagayan Valley
- Province: Isabela
- District: 1st district
- Founded: June 21, 1969
- Barangays: 12 (see Barangays)

Government
  - Type: Sangguniang Bayan
  - Mayor: Venturito C. Bulan
  - Vice Mayor: Alfredo P. Custodio
  - Representative: Antonio T. Albano
  - Electorate: 4,021 voters (2025)

Area
  - Total: 889.49 km^{2} (343.43 sq mi)
- Elevation: 46 m (151 ft)
- Highest elevation: 344 m (1,129 ft)
- Lowest elevation: 0 m (0 ft)

Population (2024 census)
  - Total: 5,871
  - Density: 6.600/km^{2} (17.09/sq mi)
  - Households: 1,449

Economy
  - Income class: 1st municipal income class
  - Poverty incidence: 17.23% (2023)
  - Revenue: ₱ 288.6 million (2024)
  - Assets: ₱ 656 million (2024)
  - Expenditure: ₱ 251.6 million (2024)
  - Liabilities: ₱ 76.32 million (2024)

Service provider
  - Electricity: Isabela 2 Electric Cooperative (ISELCO 2)
- Time zone: UTC+8 (PST)
- ZIP code: 3335
- PSGC: 0203111000
- IDD : area code: +63 (0)78
- Native languages: Ibanag; Ilocano; Kasiguranin; Paranan; Tagalog

Divilacan [ˌdiviˈlakan], officially the Municipality of Divilacan (Ibanag: Ili nat Divilacan; Ilocano: Ili ti Divilacan; Tagalog/Kasiguranin: Bayan ng Divilacan), is a municipality in the province of Isabela, Philippines. According to the 2024 census, it has a population of 5,871 people.

== Etymology ==
Divilacan was derived from the native Casiguran Dumagat Agta compound word vilacan, meaning "fish and shell." The word di implies origin. Therefore, Divilacan literally means “where fish and shells abound.”

== History ==
Divilacan was a former barrio of Tumauini. It became a separate municipality on June 21, 1969, by virtue of Republic Act No. 5776.

On April 12, 2024, the town is declared an insurgency-free municipality from the influence of CPP, NPA, and NDF, along with Maconacon.

On October 24, 2024, Severe Tropical Storm Trami (Kristine) made landfall to this town causing big destruction along with other cities/municipalities.

== Geography ==
The town is one of the four coastal municipalities of the province of Isabela facing the Philippine Sea to the east. The town is bounded to the north by Maconacon, Tumauini to the west, Ilagan to the southwest, Palanan to the south and the Philippine Sea to the east.

Divilacan is situated 101.30 kilometres (62.94 mi) from the provincial capital Ilagan, and 526.89 kilometres (327.39 mi) from the country's capital city of Manila, via Ilagan–Divilacan Road.

=== Barangays ===
Divilacan is politically subdivided into 12 barangays. Each barangay consists of puroks while some have sitios.

- Dicambangan
- Dicaruyan
- Dicatian
- Bicobian
- Dilakit
- Dimapnat
- Dimapula (Poblacion)
- Dimasalansan
- Dipudo
- Dibulos
- Ditarum
- Sapinit

=== Climate ===
Climate data for Divilacan, Isabela
Month	Jan	Feb	Mar	Apr	May	Jun	Jul	Aug	Sep	Oct	Nov	Dec	Year
Mean daily maximum °C (°F)	28.1 (82.6)	29.5 (85.1)	30.7 (87.3)	32.4 (90.3)	33.8 (92.8)	33.8 (92.8)	33.1 (91.6)	32.8 (91.0)	32.3 (90.1)	31.3 (88.3)	29.6 (85.3)	28.3 (82.9)	31.3 (88.3)
Mean daily minimum °C (°F)	19.9 (67.8)	20.0 (68.0)	21.9 (71.4)	23.1 (73.6)	24.1 (75.4)	24.4 (75.9)	24.3 (75.7)	24.2 (75.6)	23.9 (75.0)	23.5 (74.3)	22.1 (71.8)	21.0 (69.8)	22.7 (72.9)
Average precipitation mm (inches)	31.2 (1.23)	23 (0.9)	27.7 (1.09)	28.1 (1.11)	113.5 (4.47)	141.4 (5.57)	176.4 (6.94)	236.6 (9.31)	224.9 (8.85)	247.7 (9.75)	222.9 (8.78)	178 (7.0)	1,651.4 (65)
Average rainy days	10	6	5	5	13	12	15	15	15	17	16	15	144
Source: Climate-Data.org (modeled/calculated data, not measured locally)

== Demographics ==
Population census of Divilacan
Year	Pop.	±% p.a.
1970	563	—
1975	1,207	+16.53%
1980	1,859	+9.02%
1990	2,479	+2.92%
1995	2,593	+0.85%
2000	3,413	+6.07%
2007	4,602	+4.21%
2010	5,034	+3.32%
2015	5,687	+2.35%
2020	5,827	+0.51%
2024	5,871	+0.18%
Source: Philippine Statistics Authority

In the 2024 census, the population of Divilacan was 5,871 people, with a density of 6.6 inhabitants per square kilometre or 17 inhabitants per square mile.

== Economy ==
Poverty incidence of Divilacan (%)

Source: Philippine Statistics Authority

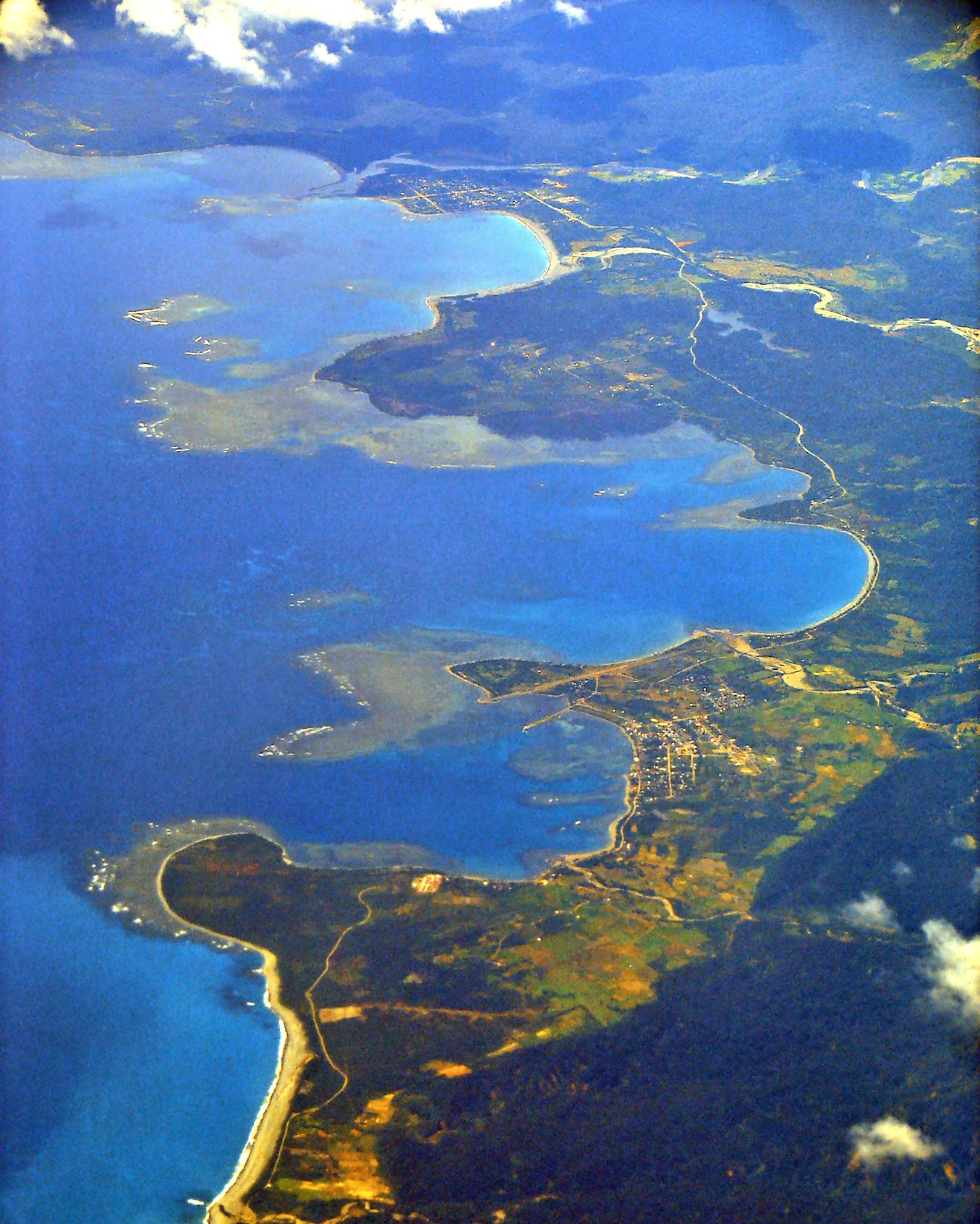
Divilacan Bay with Divilacan in the background and Maconacon in the foreground.

== Government ==
=== Local government ===
As a municipality in the Province of Isabela, government officials at the provincial and municipal levels are voted by the town. The provincial government has political jurisdiction over most local transactions of the municipal government.

The Municipality of Divilacan is governed by a mayor, designated as its local chief executive, and by a municipal council as its legislative body in accordance with the Local Government Code. The mayor, vice mayor, and the municipal councilors are elected directly by the people through an election held every three years.

Barangays are also headed by elected officials: Barangay Captain, Barangay Council, whose members are called Barangay Councilors. The barangays have SK federation which represents the barangay, headed by SK chairperson and whose members are called SK councilors. All officials are also elected every three years.

=== Elected officials ===
Members of the Divilacan Municipal Council (2022-2025)
Position	Name
District Representative	Antonio T. Albano
Municipal Mayor	Venturito C. Bulan
Municipal Vice-Mayor	Alfredo P. Custodio
Municipal Councilors	Melvin Dan C. Bulan
Municipal Councilors	Olegario S. Cortez
Municipal Councilors	Hercleo T. Limboy
Municipal Councilors	Cesar P. Tabbada
Municipal Councilors	Fredirick O. Custodio
Municipal Councilors	Marina G. Equias
Municipal Councilors	Antonio b. Singueo
Municipal Councilors	Erlinda C. Factora

=== Congress representation ===
Divilacan, belonging to the first legislative district of the province of Isabela, is currently represented by Antonio T. Albano.

== Education ==
The Schools Division of Isabela governs the town's public education system. The division office is a field office of the DepEd in Cagayan Valley. The Palanan Schools District Office governs the public and private elementary and public and private high schools throughout the municipality.

=== Primary and elementary schools ===
- Bicobian Elementary School
- Dikaruyan Primary School
- Dimasalansan Elementary School
- Divilacan Central School
- Sapinit Primary School

=== Secondary school ===
- Divilacan National High School

== Infrastructure ==
Divilacan is accessible via sea and air. The town is served by the Maconacon Airport in the neighboring town of Maconacon which connects this isolated town to Cauayan Airport, in Cauayan.

The construction of an 82-kilometer Ilagan–Divilacan Road through the protected Sierra Madre mountains is on-going to open access to the coastal towns of Divilacan, Palanan, and Maconacon. The approved budget contract of the project amounting to P1.5B, will pass through the foothills of the 359,486-hectare Northern Sierra Madre mountain ranges. The project will improve an old logging road used by a defunct logging company until the 1990s. It will start in Barangay Sindon Bayabo in Ilagan City and will end in Barangay Dicatian in this town. The project is started in March 2016 and is expected to be completed in 2024.
