= Maconacon =

Municipality in Isabela, Philippines

- Municipality
- Municipality of Maconacon
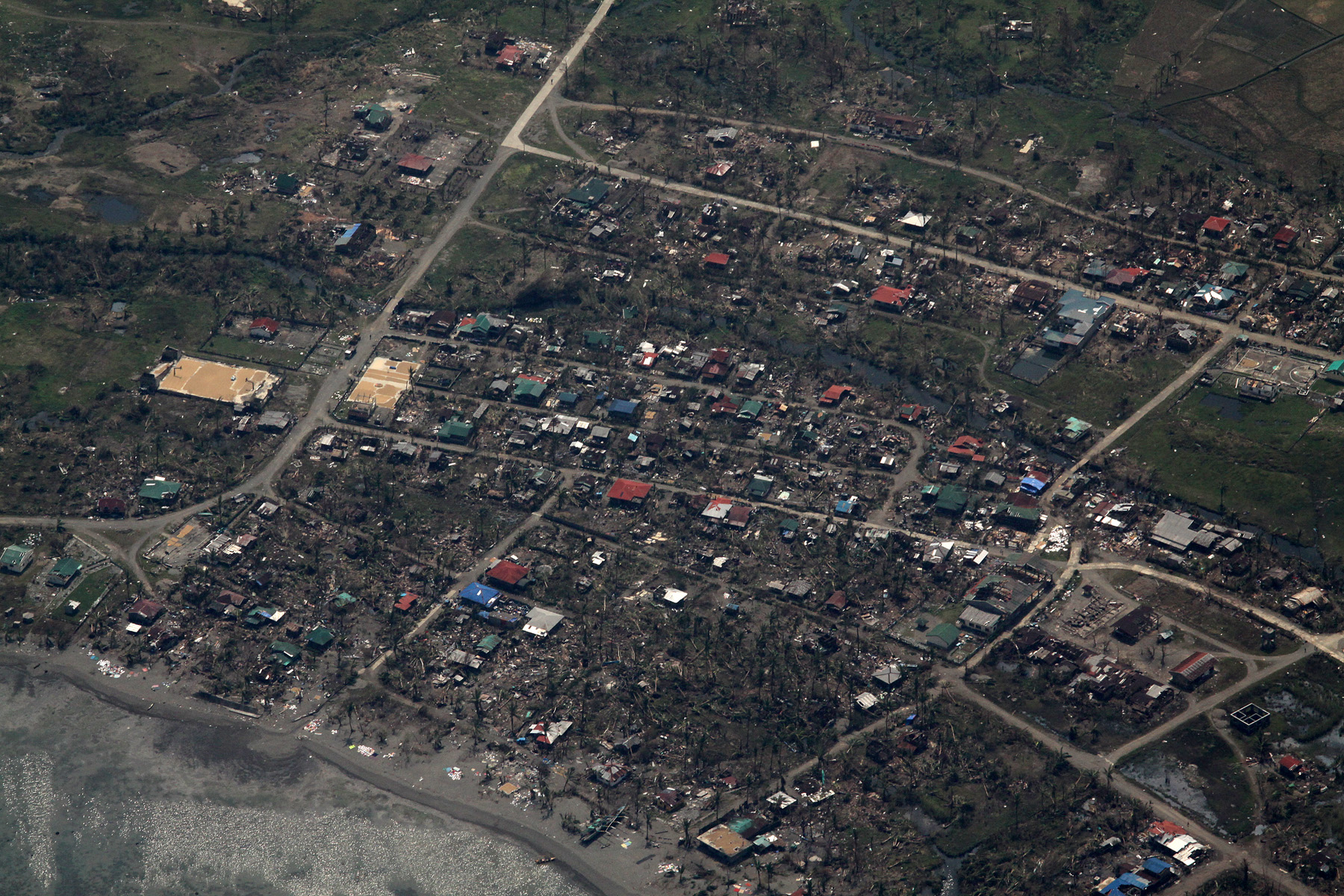
- Aerial view of Maconacon after Typhoon Megi in October 2010

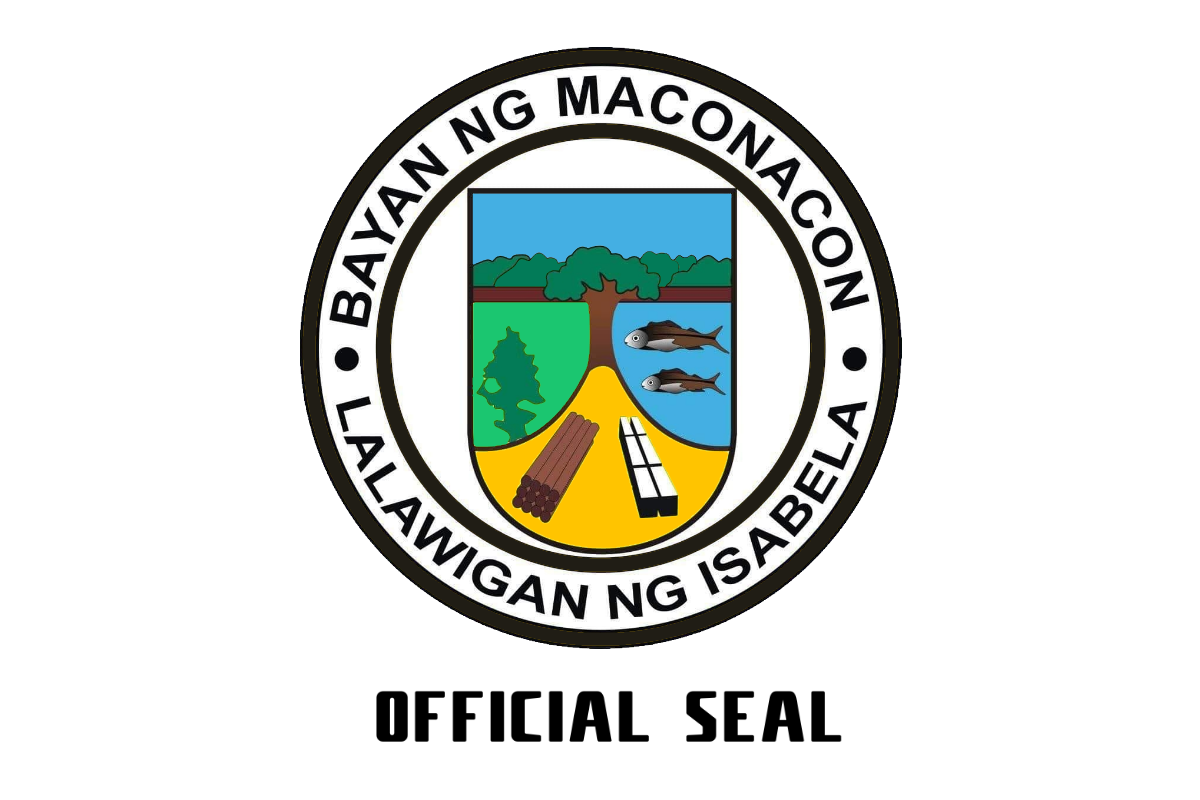
- Flag Seal

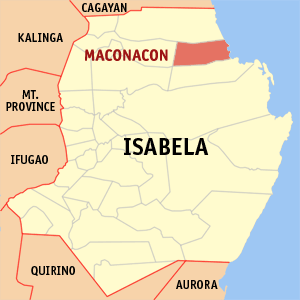
- Map of Isabela with Maconacon highlighted
- Interactive map of Maconacon
- Location within the Philippines
- Coordinates: 17°23′14″N 122°14′17″E
- Country: Philippines
- Region: Cagayan Valley
- Province: Isabela
- District: 1st district
- Founded: June 21, 1969
- Barangays: 10 (see Barangays)

Government
  - Type: Sangguniang Bayan
  - Mayor: Rolly M. Quebral
  - Vice Mayor: Ma. Lycelle Kate D. Vicente
  - Representative: Antonio T. Albano
  - Electorate: 3,702 voters (2025)

Area
  - Total: 538.66 km^{2} (207.98 sq mi)
- Elevation: 113 m (371 ft)
- Highest elevation: 903 m (2,963 ft)
- Lowest elevation: 0 m (0 ft)

Population (2024 census)
  - Total: 4,252
  - Density: 7.894/km^{2} (20.44/sq mi)
  - Households: 967

Economy
  - Income class: 2nd municipal income class
  - Poverty incidence: 16.59% (2023)
  - Revenue: ₱ 195.9 million (2024)
  - Assets: ₱ 407 million (2024)
  - Expenditure: ₱ 141.1 million (2024)
  - Liabilities: ₱ 15.2 million (2024)

Service provider
  - Electricity: Isabela 2 Electric Cooperative (ISELCO 2)
- Time zone: UTC+8 (PST)
- ZIP code: 3333
- PSGC: 0203117000
- IDD : area code: +63 (0)78
- Native languages: Ibanag; Ilocano; Atta; Dupaningan Agta; Kasiguranin; Tagalog

Maconacon, officially the Municipality of Maconacon (Ibanag: Ili nat Maconacon; Ilocano: Ili ti Maconacon; Tagalog/Kasiguranin: Bayan ng Maconacon), is a municipality in the province of Isabela, Philippines. According to the 2024 census, it has a population of 4,252 people making it the least populous municipality in the province.

== History ==
Maconacon was a former barrio of Cabagan. It became a separate municipality on June 21, 1969, by virtue of Republic Act No. 5776.

In June 2009, Municipal Mayor Francisco Talosig was shot in an ambush and died after being in a coma for four months. His successor, Erlinda Domingo, was also assassinated in 2013.

On April 12, 2024, the town is declared an insurgency-free municipality from the influence of CPP, NPA, and NDF, along with Divilacan.

== Geography ==
Maconacon is one of the four coastal municipalities of the province of Isabela facing the Philippine Sea to the east. Separated from the rest of the province by the mighty Sierra Madre mountains, it is considered to be one of the most remote and isolated community in the province.

The town is bounded to the north by Peñablanca in the province of Cagayan, San Pablo and Cabagan to the west, Tumauini to the southwest, Divilacan to the south and the Philippine Sea to the east.

Maconacon is situated 107.90 kilometres (67.05 mi) from the provincial capital Ilagan, and 533.49 kilometres (331.50 mi) from the country's capital city of Manila, via Ilagan–Divilacan Road.

=== Barangays ===
Maconacon is politically subdivided into 10 barangays. Each barangay consists of puroks while some have sitios.

- Diana
- Eleonor (Poblacion)
- Fely (Poblacion)
- Lita (Poblacion)
- Reina Mercedes
- Minanga
- Malasin
- Canadam
- Aplaya
- Santa Marina (Dianggo)

=== Climate ===
Climate data for Maconacon
Month	Jan	Feb	Mar	Apr	May	Jun	Jul	Aug	Sep	Oct	Nov	Dec	Year
Mean daily maximum °C (°F)	28.2 (82.8)	29.7 (85.5)	30.7 (87.3)	32.5 (90.5)	33.8 (92.8)	33.8 (92.8)	33.0 (91.4)	32.7 (90.9)	32.3 (90.1)	31.4 (88.5)	29.7 (85.5)	28.3 (82.9)	31.3 (88.4)
Daily mean °C (°F)	24.0 (75.2)	24.8 (76.6)	26.3 (79.3)	27.9 (82.2)	29.0 (84.2)	29.1 (84.4)	28.6 (83.5)	28.4 (83.1)	28.1 (82.6)	27.5 (81.5)	25.9 (78.6)	24.6 (76.3)	27.0 (80.6)
Mean daily minimum °C (°F)	19.9 (67.8)	20.0 (68.0)	21.9 (71.4)	23.3 (73.9)	24.2 (75.6)	24.5 (76.1)	24.3 (75.7)	24.2 (75.6)	24.0 (75.2)	23.6 (74.5)	22.1 (71.8)	21.0 (69.8)	22.8 (73.0)
Average rainfall mm (inches)	94 (3.7)	55 (2.2)	63 (2.5)	55 (2.2)	112 (4.4)	160 (6.3)	175 (6.9)	208 (8.2)	188 (7.4)	382 (15.0)	467 (18.4)	251 (9.9)	2,210 (87.1)
Source: Climate-Data.org

Maconacon has a tropical monsoon climate (Am) with moderate rainfall from January to May and heavy to very heavy rainfall from June to December.

== Demographics ==
Population census of Maconacon

Year	Pop.	±% p.a.
1970	1,390	—
1975	2,433	+11.88%
1980	4,521	+13.19%
1990	7,259	+4.85%
1995	5,895	−3.82%
2000	3,721	−9.39%

Year	Pop.	±% p.a.
2007	3,991	+0.97%
2010	3,615	−3.54%
2015	4,253	+3.14%
2020	3,977	−1.40%
2024	4,252	+1.62%

Source: Philippine Statistics Authority

In the 2024 census, the population of Maconacon was 4,252 people, with a density of 7.9 inhabitants per square kilometre or 20 inhabitants per square mile.

== Economy ==
Poverty incidence of Maconacon (%)

Source: Philippine Statistics Authority

== Government ==
=== Local government ===
As a municipality in the Province of Isabela, government officials at the provincial and municipal levels are voted by the town. The provincial government has political jurisdiction over most local transactions of the municipal government.

The Municipality of Maconacon is governed by a mayor, designated as its local chief executive, and by a municipal council as its legislative body in accordance with the Local Government Code. The mayor, vice mayor, and the municipal councilors are elected directly by the people in elections held every three years.

Barangays are also headed by elected officials: Barangay Captain, Barangay Council, whose members are called Barangay Councilors. The barangays have SK federation which represents the barangay, headed by SK chairperson and whose members are called SK councilors. All officials are also elected every three years.

=== Elected officials ===
Members of the Maconacon Municipal Council (2022-2025)
Position	Name
District Representative	Antonio T. Albano
Municipal Mayor	Rolly M. Quebral
Municipal Vice-Mayor	Ma. Lycelle Kate D. Vicente
Municipal Councilors	Aida G. Manalay
Municipal Councilors	Chester Vicente
Municipal Councilors	Emmanuel B. Guiñez
Municipal Councilors	Rene C. Baricog, Sr.
Municipal Councilors	Jannet P. Costales
Municipal Councilors	Richard Peralta
Municipal Councilors	Michael P. Perucho
Municipal Councilors	Edilbert M. Rapanut

=== Congress representation ===
Maconacon, belonging to the first legislative district of the province of Isabela, is currently represented by Antonio T. Albano.

== Education ==
The Schools Division of Isabela governs the town's public education system. The division office is a field office of the DepEd in Cagayan Valley. The Palanan Schools District Office governs the public and private elementary and public and private high schools throughout the municipality.

=== Elementary school ===
- Maconacon Central School

=== Secondary schools ===
- Maconacon National High School
- Reina Mercedes Integrated School

== Infrastructure ==
Maconacon is accessible via sea and air. Its primary gateway is the Maconacon Airport which connects this isolated town to the rest of the province through Cauayan Airport, also in Cauayan and Tuguegarao Airport in Tuguegarao.
