= Tropical Storm York =

Pacific severe tropical storm in 1999

Severe Tropical Storm York (Neneng)
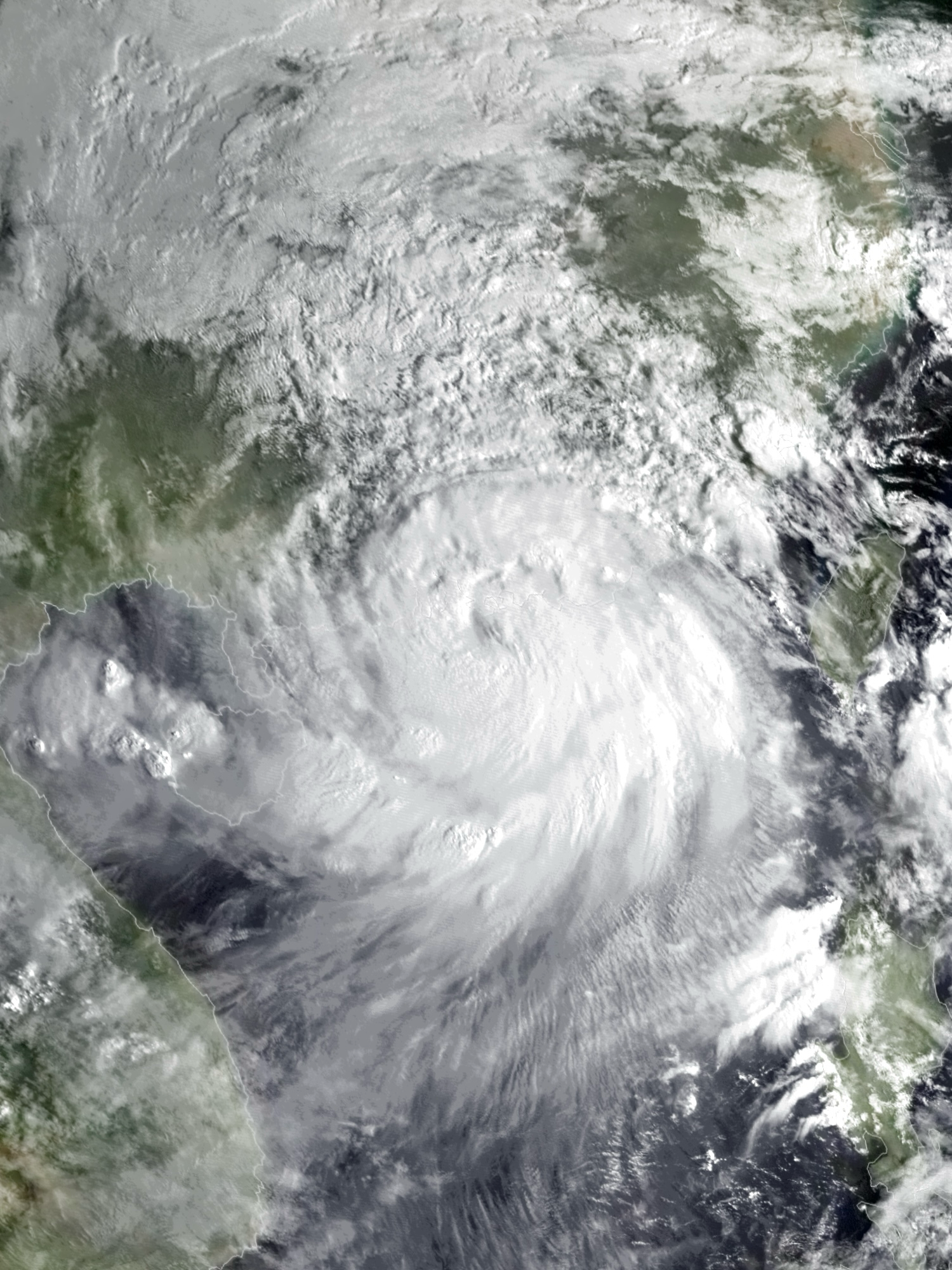
- York at peak intensity making landfall in China on September 15

Meteorological history
- Formed: September 10, 1999
- Dissipated: September 17, 1999

Severe tropical storm
- 10-minute sustained (JMA)
- Highest winds: 100 km/h (65 mph)
- Lowest pressure: 980 hPa (mbar); 28.94 inHg

Category 1-equivalent typhoon
- 1-minute sustained (SSHWS/JTWC)
- Highest winds: 130 km/h (80 mph)

Overall effects
- Fatalities: 35 total
- Damage: $34 million (1999 USD)
- Areas affected: Hong Kong, Portuguese Macau, South China, Philippines
- Part of the 1999 Pacific typhoon season

Severe Tropical Storm York (or Typhoon York), also known in the Philippines as Tropical Depression Neneng, was a tropical cyclone that formed in September 1999. It brought severe impacts to the Philippines and southeastern China, causing 35 deaths. York is considered the worst tropical cyclone to hit Hong Kong since 1983. York was first noted as a tropical disturbance over the Philippine Sea on September 9, 1999, and became a tropical depression three days later on September 12. Initially, the intensity of the system was that of a weak tropical depression; however, it formed a new center while in the northern South China Sea west of Luzon soon after. York intensified into a tropical storm on September 13 and its track was erratic and remained stationary for a while, until it landfalled near Hong Kong as a minimal typhoon on September 16. York then weakened to a tropical storm and quickly degenerated into a remnant area of low pressure soon after on the following day.

York generated heavy rainfall and flooding when it crossed over the Philippines, which claimed the lives of 18 people. York is particularly noted for leading to the Hong Kong Observatory issuing the highest No. 10 warning for the first time since 1983 as well as killing two people in Hong Kong when it passed near the city. A cargo ship reportedly sunk, 18,000 homes lost power in the wake of the storm and 4,000 trees were uprooted in Hong Kong. In Macau, one person was injured and 120 incidents related to the storm were reported. In the Chinese province of Guangdong, fifteen people lost their lives and from the heavy rainfall. Overall, total damages were estimated to be at least $34 million (USD).

== Meteorological history ==
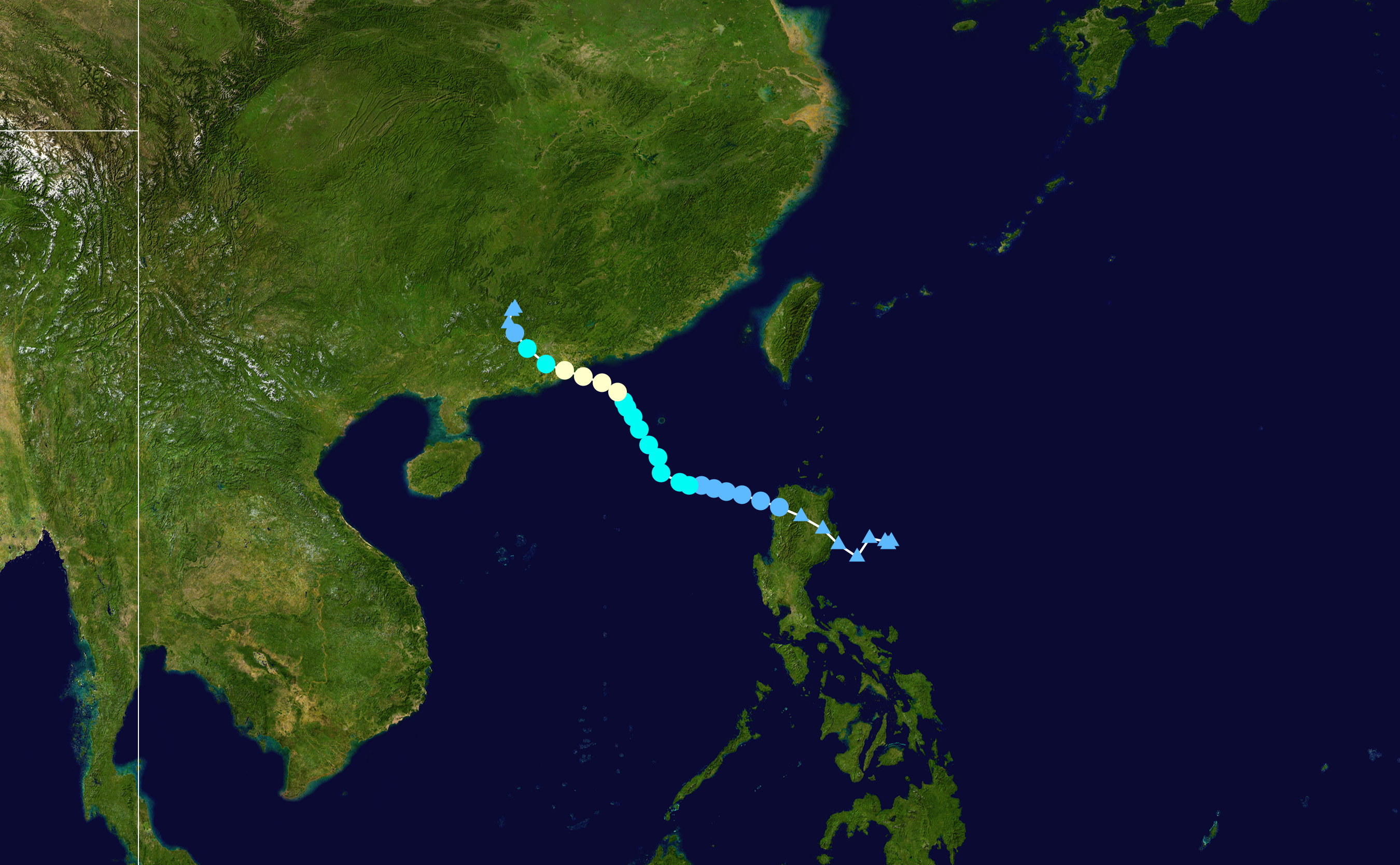
Map plotting the storm's track and intensity, according to the Saffir–Simpson scale Map key Saffir–Simpson scale Tropical depression (≤38 mph, ≤62 km/h) Tropical storm (39–73 mph, 63–118 km/h) Category 1 (74–95 mph, 119–153 km/h) Category 2 (96–110 mph, 154–177 km/h) Category 3 (111–129 mph, 178–208 km/h) Category 4 (130–156 mph, 209–251 km/h) Category 5 (≥157 mph, ≥252 km/h) Unknown Storm type Tropical cyclone Subtropical cyclone Extratropical cyclone, remnant low, tropical disturbance, or monsoon depression

On September 5, 1999, the Joint Typhoon Warning Center (JTWC) began monitoring an area of convection southeast of Guam. Slow development for the low pressure area ensued over the next few days as it steadily headed west. The low pressure area slowly developed, however the organization of the wave was insufficient to be considered a tropical cyclone until September 10, when the JTWC issued a formation alert at 0300 UTC. PAGASA was first to upgrade the invest to a tropical depression and gave the storm the name of Neneng, with JTWC soon following suit and initiating warnings on the tropical depression. The depression did not initially significantly intensify due to land interaction with Luzon. However, good outflow was present in the depression, and deep convection began to wrap around the center.

The depression relocated to the west of Luzon on September 12. The former convection quickly dissipated and was absorbed by the new circulation center. Upper-level outflow, benefited by minimal vertical shear then became favourable. The depression subsequently reconsolidated and intensified into a tropical storm, receiving the name York. York's track was relatively erratic, and it remained nearly stationary on September 13, with the slow movement due to the weakening of a mid-level ridge over southern China. Several circulation centers were present at the time.

York began to move on a northwesterly course guided by a strengthening yet weak subtropical ridge over southern China on September 14. However, the movement of York was slow and once almost stationary due to a weak steering flow. On other hand, conditions were relatively conducive at the time, allowing gradual and steady intensification of York. Both the Japan Meteorological Agency (JMA) and Hong Kong Observatory (HKO) assessed it as a severe tropical storm.

York once again briefly stalled on September 15. However, it continued to strengthen with a broad, ragged eye developing. Consequently, the JTWC upgraded York to a typhoon at noon UTC, with the HKO following suit later with support of ground observations. The JMA, however, never recognized it as a typhoon. The ridge re-strengthened which caused York to move west-northwesterly as it headed near Hong Kong. Pressure at Waglan Island reached 971 hPa (28.7 inHg) around 0000 UTC on September 16. Maximum sustained winds of York peaked at 130 kilometres per hour (81 mph; 70 kn). Ultimately, York passed near Lantau Island of Hong Kong and eventually made landfall in Zhuhai. Once over land, York deteriorated rapidly and dissipated into a low pressure area over China the next day.

== Impact ==
=== Philippines ===
As the developing depression crossed the Philippines, it brought heavy showers of up to 400 mm (16 in), which caused some flooding in the Cagayan Valley. Eighteen people were killed in landslides in northern Luzon.

=== Hong Kong and Macao ===
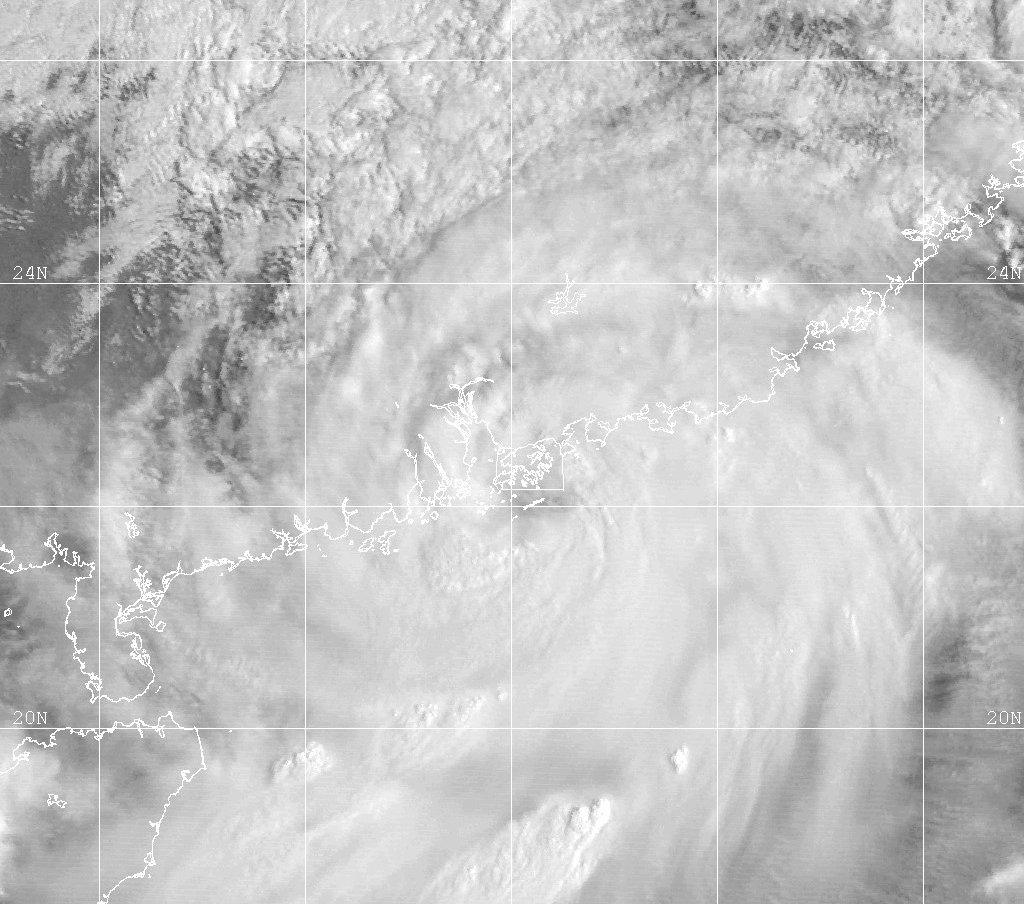
York making landfall in Hong Kong on September 16

Upon making landfall at west of Hong Kong, winds gusted to 234 km/h (145 mph) at Waglan Island with 10-minute sustained winds of 169 km/h (105 mph) recorded. Sustained hurricane-force winds were also recorded in Cheung Chau and Sai Kung, with storm-force sustained winds also recorded in Tsing Yi, North Point and Tsim Sha Tsui Ferry Pier, making York one of the strongest storms to affect Hong Kong after World War II, with impacts rivaling Typhoon Wanda of 1962 and Typhoon Mangkhut of 2018. Overall in Hong Kong, strong storm to hurricane-force winds were recorded. Both the HKO and Macao Meteorological and Geophysical Bureau (SMG) issued the No.10 hurricane signal, which lasted 11 and 8.5 hours respectively, both post-WWII records in terms of length.

In Hong Kong, a man was found dead in Cheung Chau 64 hours after being swept away by waves. Another man was killed by debris blown by high winds in Tseung Kwan O. Injuries reached to 500 in the city in which 11 were severely injured, making York the storm that led to most injuries in the city since World War II. In Wan Chai, more than 400 pieces of glass were blown off from several buildings. A tower crane collapsed and hit a nearby building in the same region, forcing 25 people to evacuate due to a suspected gas leak. 64 reported flooding cases were reported during York, with over 340 hectares of farmland flooded, forcing over 300 people to evacuate. A total of more than 800 signboards and more than 4,000 trees collapsed, with a large number of roads blocked by fallen trees, and tattered signboards seen everywhere on the streets. Electrical shortages were reported in several places in Hong Kong, with water shortages also reported in Sai Kung and Cheung Chau. Transportation came to a halt with at least 470 flights delayed or cancelled due to bad weather, affecting 80 thousand passengers. Damages could total to as high as several billion Hong Kong dollars.

In Macao, York led to violent winds, with sustained winds of 108 km/h (67 mph) and gusts as high as 181 km/h (112 mph) recorded in Taipa Grande. 120 incidents were reported during the storm, with a chimney collapsing in Zona Norte. At least one injury was reported during the storm. Transportation came to a complete halt with schools, shops and most casinos temporarily closed. 30 flights were cancelled or delayed.

=== Mainland China ===
Throughout the affected areas, at least 15 deaths and 700 injuries were reported. Direct economic damages added up to 200 million RMD (US$30 million) in mainland China. Zhuhai was particularly affected due to York landfalling at Xiangzhou District in the city, with a total of 71 people injuries that required hospital treatment reported in Zhuhai. School, work, and transport were suspended. Electricity shortages were recorded, which affected thousands of civilians. Billboards, windows, 900 trees, and 400 scaffolds were blown down by high winds. The direct economic losses in Zhuhai amounted to about 100 million RMD.

== See also ==
- Typhoon Wanda (1962)
- Typhoon Rose (1971)
- Typhoon Hope (1979)
- Typhoon Ellen (1983)
- Typhoon Becky (1993)
- Typhoon Vicente (2012)
- Typhoon Hato (2017)
- Typhoon Mangkhut (2018)
- Typhoon Saola (2023)
- Tropical Storm Wipha (2025)
