= Typhoon Ellen (1983) =

Pacific typhoon in 1983

Typhoon Ellen (Herming)
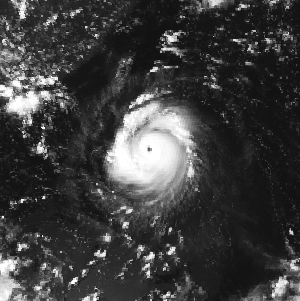
- Typhoon Ellen at peak intensity on September 5, off the northeastern coast of Luzon

Meteorological history
- Formed: August 27, 1983
- Dissipated: September 10, 1983

Violent typhoon
- 10-minute sustained (JMA)
- Highest winds: 205 km/h (125 mph)
- Lowest pressure: 925 hPa (mbar); 27.32 inHg

Category 4-equivalent typhoon
- 1-minute sustained (SSHWS/JTWC)
- Highest winds: 230 km/h (145 mph)
- Lowest pressure: 925 hPa (mbar); 27.32 inHg

Overall effects
- Fatalities: 23
- Missing: 41
- Damage: $79.7 million (1983 USD)
- Areas affected: British Hong Kong; Portuguese Macau; Philippines; People's Republic of China
- IBTrACS
- Part of the 1983 Pacific typhoon season

Typhoon Ellen, known in the Philippines as Typhoon Herming, was considered the worst typhoon to hit China since 1979. Typhoon Ellen was first noted as a tropical disturbance east of the International Date Line on August 26, 1983, and became a tropical storm soon after crossing the dateline on the morning of August 29. Initially, strong wind shear inhibited development over the next five days, and the cyclone began to track south of west. On September 2, conditions aloft finally improved and the cyclone strengthened into a typhoon on September 4 as it tracked west-northwest. Approaching Luzon late on September 5, Ellen intensified rapidly into a strong typhoon with winds of 200 km/h (125 mph) before interaction with Luzon began to weaken the cyclone. Its final landfall was at Portuguese Macau on the morning of September 9 as a minimal typhoon. The next day, Ellen ceased to exist.

Despite passing north of the Philippines, the storm killed three and left 15 persons injured. Damage in the country totaled $680,000 (1983 USD). While passing near British Hong Kong, 50,000 people lost electrical services. Around 200 homes were destroyed; a total 2,000 people lost their homes, 1,600 of whom sought shelter. Throughout the city, eight people perished and 339 were hurt, including 120 seriously. Ellen spawned the second tornado ever recorded in Hong Kong, and the first ever recorded during a typhoon. Elsewhere, in Portuguese Macau, little damage was reported. Offshore, 40 crew members were rescued in a shipwreck. In a separate incident, eight people were lost at sea. Furthermore, ten Taiwan fishing boats capsized in the South China Sea, resulting in 48 fishermen missing, though 103 persons also survived. Overall, damage totaled $79 million and 23 people died.

== Meteorological history ==
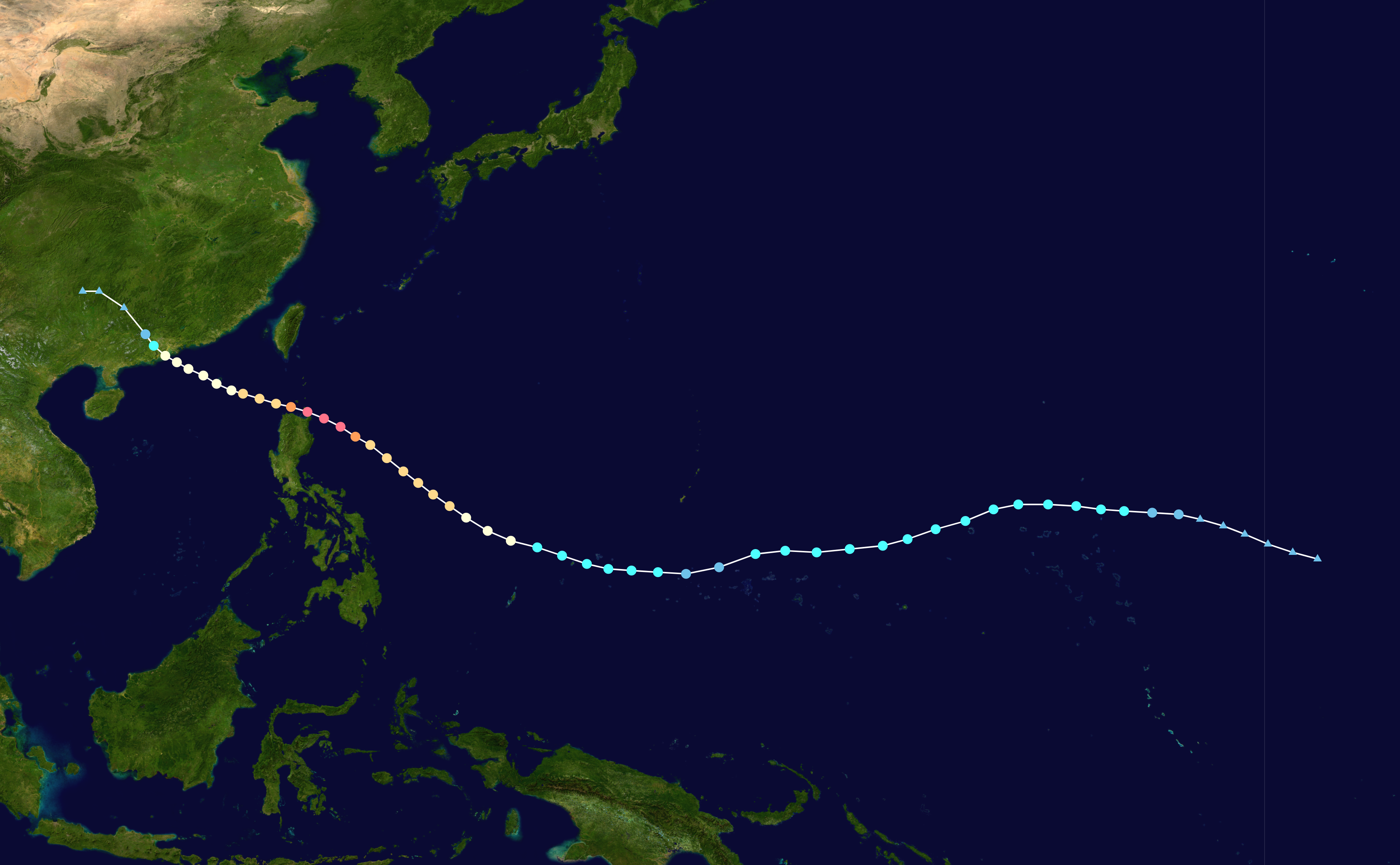
Map plotting the storm's track and intensity, according to the Saffir–Simpson scale Map key Saffir–Simpson scale Tropical depression (≤38 mph, ≤62 km/h) Tropical storm (39–73 mph, 63–118 km/h) Category 1 (74–95 mph, 119–153 km/h) Category 2 (96–110 mph, 154–177 km/h) Category 3 (111–129 mph, 178–208 km/h) Category 4 (130–156 mph, 209–251 km/h) Category 5 (≥157 mph, ≥252 km/h) Unknown Storm type Tropical cyclone Subtropical cyclone Extratropical cyclone, remnant low, tropical disturbance, or monsoon depression

Typhoon Ellen originated from a tropical disturbance located 500 km (310 mi) south-southwest of the Johnston Atoll on August 26. Based on the development of rainbands, satellite intensity estimates via the Dvorak technique indicated winds of 55 km/h (35 mph). The disturbance crossed the dateline two days later and a Tropical Cyclone Formation Alert (TCFA) was subsequently issued. At 0000 UTC on August 29, the Joint Typhoon Warning Center (JTWC) first classified the system. Initially, the storm did not develop significantly due to strong wind shear caused by an intense high pressure area north of the cyclone. This also caused Ellen to turn west-southwest. On August 31, however, the Japan Meteorological Agency (JMA) started warning on the system, declaring it a tropical storm. (Note: The Japan Meteorological Agency is the official Regional Specialized Meteorological Center for the western Pacific Ocean.) The next day, the JTWC briefly downgraded the system into a tropical depression; however, the JMA held the storm's intensity to 65 km/h (40 mph) for several days. On September 2, the storm began to turn west-northwest and environmental conditions became much more favorable for development. The JMA upgraded Ellen into a severe tropical storm early the following morning. Later on September 3, the Philippine Atmospheric, Geophysical and Astronomical Services Administration (PASAGA) started tracking the storm and assigned it with the local name Herming. At 1200 UTC, the JTWC upgraded Ellen into a typhoon, though the JMA did not follow suit until early on September 4.

After maintaining this intensity for 12 hours, Ellen deepened slightly that evening, though the JTWC suggests that the storm intensified into a Category 2 hurricane on the United States Saffir-Simpson Hurricane Wind Scale. By midday on September 5, data from both agencies indicated that Ellen developed winds 110 mph (175 km/h) while located 370 km (230 mi) west of Luzon. Thereafter, Ellen began to rapidly intensify and according to the JTWC, the pressure decreased by 28 mbar (0.83 inHg). At 0600 UTC on September 6, Ellen reached peak intensity, with the JMA estimating winds of 120 mph (195 km/h) and a pressure of 925 mbar (27.3 inHg). Meanwhile, the JTWC suggests that Ellen reached a peak intensity of 125 mph (200 km/h) and a slightly higher pressure of 928 mbar (27.4 inHg).

Ellen's peak intensity was short-lived; Typhoon Ellen soon began to weaken steadily as it moved through the Luzon Straits while interacting with Luzon. After turning northwest, the JMA reported the winds had reduced to 90 mph (145 km/h) at 0000 UTC on September 7. At that time, the JTWC noted that Ellen's winds were equivalent to a Category 2 hurricane. However, the JMA suggests that the weakening trend leveled off late on September 7. The next day, PASAGA ceased monitoring the system as it was no longer a threat to the Philippines. According to the JMA, the system moved ashore near Macao at 0000 UTC on September 9 as an 85 mph (135 km/h) typhoon, though the JTWC estimates that the storm was a little weaker at landfall. Ellen dissipated rapidly overland, and the JTWC downgraded Ellen into a tropical depression 12 hours later. However, the JMA kept watching the system until 0600 UTC on September 10.

== Preparations and impact ==
Mean hourly wind speed in Hong Kong, as recorded by the Royal Hong Kong Observatory.Gale Force Winds
Storm Force Winds
Hurricane Force Winds
Maximum wind gust speed in Hong Kong, as recorded by the Royal Hong Kong Observatory. Wind gust speed reached Hurricane level in all areas.
Estimated speed. Wind gust speed exceeded anemogram's upper limit at this location.

Due to the storm's threat to Hong Kong, a no. 10 hurricane signal was issued. Across Hong Kong, schools and government offices were ordered to be closed and 250 shelters were opened. In addition, most shops and restaurants as well as all financial markets were closed.

Despite passing north of the Philippines, the storm killed three and 15 people sustained injuries. Damage in the country totaled $680,000. A total of 605 dwellings were damaged, excluding 105 that were destroyed. (Note: All currencies are converted to United States Dollars using Philippines Measuring worth and calculator.com with an exchange rate of the year 1983.) Upon making landfall in Hong Kong, winds gusted to 154 km/h (96 mph) at Stanley. Rainfall totaled 231.8 mm (9.13 in) at Hong Kong's Royal Observatory (RO or ROHK, now HKO). Twenty-two ships were wrecked, including a 21,000-ton freighter, forcing the rescue of all 40 crew members. A 185 ft (56 m) yacht Osprey carried nine people, eight of which were lost and presumed dead. Several minor collisions were reported between ships. Along the coastal province Guangdong in southern China, communications and public services were disrupted. Ferry services from Hong Kong to Macao were suspended. On September 8, ten Taiwan fishing boats capsized in the South China Sea; consequently, 48 fishermen were missing, though 103 persons survived and later took refuge at Pratas Island, Taiwan (ROC).

In Hong Kong, 50,000 people lost power. About 200 houses were destroyed. More than 2,000 people were left homeless; 1,600 of the homeless sought emergency shelter. Flights to the Kai Tak Airport were cancelled as the airport was closed for 12 hours. Large areas of farmland were damaged. Throughout the city, eight people perished, including a girl that was crushed by a falling cabinet. Two sisters were killed via a landslide while a fireman died when trying to rescue someone. Additionally, 339 people were injured, including 120 seriously. Forty-five people were injured due to flying glass and failing objects. Typhoon Ellen also spawned the second tornado ever recorded in Hong Kong, and the first ever recorded during the passage of a typhoon. According to the HKO, Ellen was Hong Kong's worst typhoon since Typhoon Hope of 1979.

In nearby Macao, minor property damage was reported and 15 people were initially rendered as missing. However, by October 13, 10 people remained missing and were then presumed dead. In all, damage totaled $79 million (1983 USD) and 20 people were killed due to Typhoon Ellen in mainland China.

== See also ==
- Typhoon Ora (1972)
- Typhoon Vicente (2012) – a typhoon in 2012, that rapidly intensified before striking Guangdong.
- Typhoon Hato (2017) – a typhoon in 2017, that rapidly intensified before striking Guangdong.
- Typhoon Mangkhut (2018) – a typhoon in 2018, that took a similar track and caused widespread damages over Hong Kong.
- Typhoon Saola (2023) – a typhoon in 2023, that made its closest pass over Macau and Hong Kong.
- Typhoon Ragasa (2025) – a typhoon in 2025, that brought destructive winds even though it didn’t directly affect Hong Kong and Macau.
