= Tropical Storm Wipha =

Pacific severe tropical storm in 2025

Severe Tropical Storm Wipha (Crising)
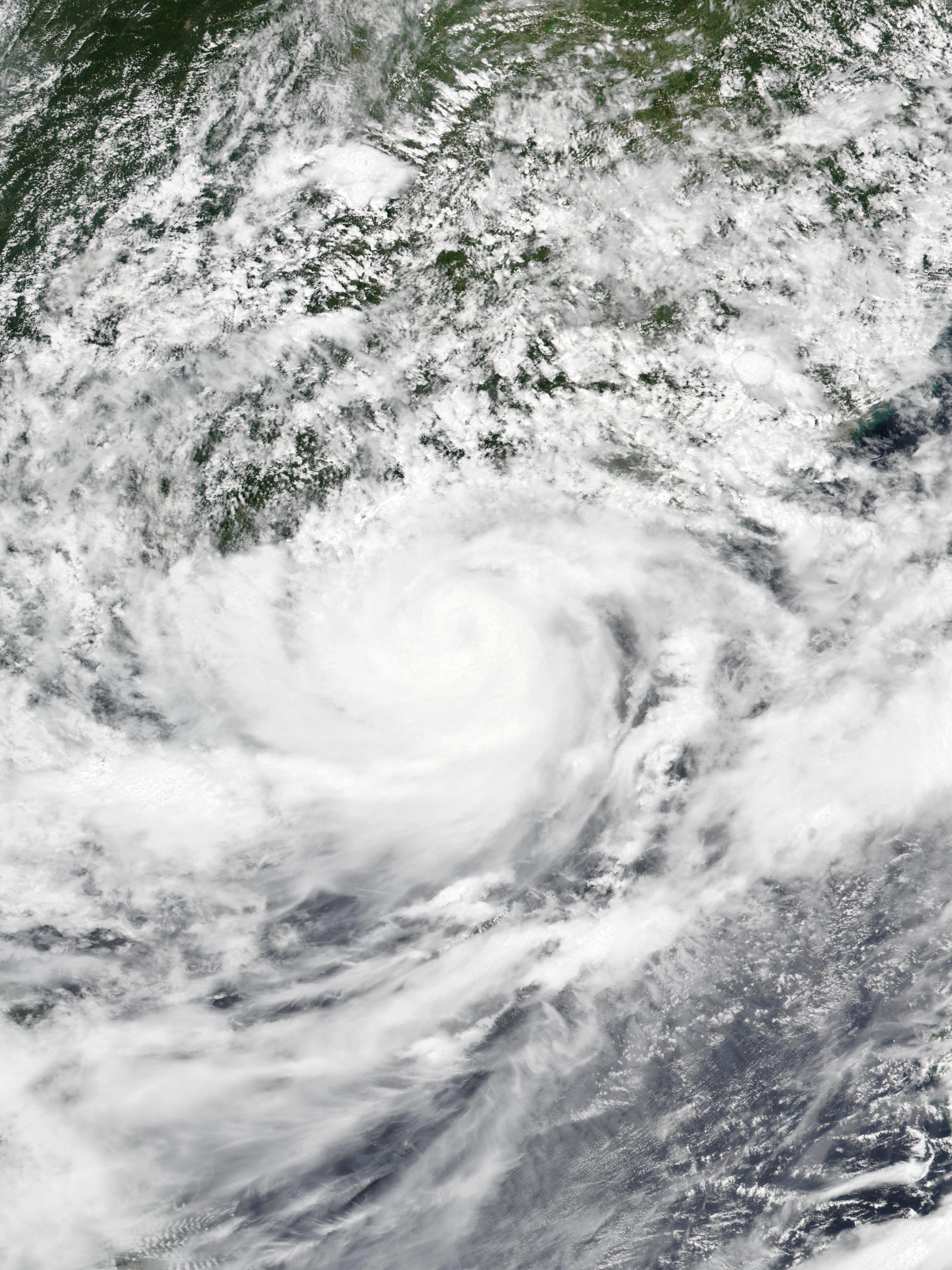
- Wipha at its peak intensity near the Pearl River estuary on July 20

Meteorological history
- Formed: July 16, 2025
- Dissipated: July 23, 2025

Severe tropical storm
- 10-minute sustained (JMA)
- Highest winds: 110 km/h (70 mph)
- Lowest pressure: 970 hPa (mbar); 28.64 inHg

Category 1-equivalent typhoon
- 1-minute sustained (SSHWS/JTWC)
- Highest winds: 120 km/h (75 mph)
- Lowest pressure: 970 hPa (mbar); 28.64 inHg

Overall effects
- Fatalities: 20–54
- Missing: 22
- Damage: >$717 million (2025 USD) (Note: Total damage could reach approximately US$1.08 billion; $364 million was recorded in the Philippines and combined with Co-May and Francisco.)
- Areas affected: Philippines; Taiwan; Hong Kong; Macau; Southern China; Vietnam; Laos; Thailand; Cambodia; Myanmar
- IBTrACS
- Part of the 2025 Pacific typhoon season

Severe Tropical Storm Wipha, (Note: The name Wipha (Thai: วิภา, [wi˦˥(ʔ) pʰaː˧]) was contributed by Thailand and is a feminine given name meaning "luster, brilliance" in Thai.) known in the Philippines as Severe Tropical Storm Crising, was a strong and deadly tropical cyclone that affected South China and Northern Vietnam after crossing Northern Philippines, Hong Kong, and Macau during mid-July 2025. The sixth named storm of the 2025 Pacific typhoon season, Wipha originated from a disturbance in the Philippine Sea on July 16 and then intensified into a tropical storm on July 19.

Wipha then passed through far northern Luzon before gradually intensifying into a severe tropical storm on the same day. The Joint Typhoon Warning Center (JTWC) and the Hong Kong Observatory (HKO) further upgraded Wipha into a typhoon on the following day as it approached the Pearl River estuary, although the Japan Meteorological Agency (JMA) maintained its severe tropical storm status.

Due to its close proximity to Hong Kong, the HKO once again issued the highest signal category in anticipation of the storm, Hurricane Signal No. 10, almost two years after Typhoon Saola battered the territory. Wipha continued to track closely over Hong Kong and Macau, bringing strong winds and heavy rainfall to the territories. The storm made landfall over Taishan in Guangdong Province on July 20 as a minimal typhoon, and it gradually weakened afterwards as it headed west-southwestward towards the Gulf of Tonkin. The storm later made its second landfall between Hưng Yên and Ninh Bình in Northern Vietnam as a weakening tropical storm. It continued moving inland until before eventually dissipating on July 23.

Wipha helped enhance the southwest monsoon and generated flooding and landslides that caused extensive damage in the Philippines, leaving 20 people dead and eight others missing.

== Meteorological history ==
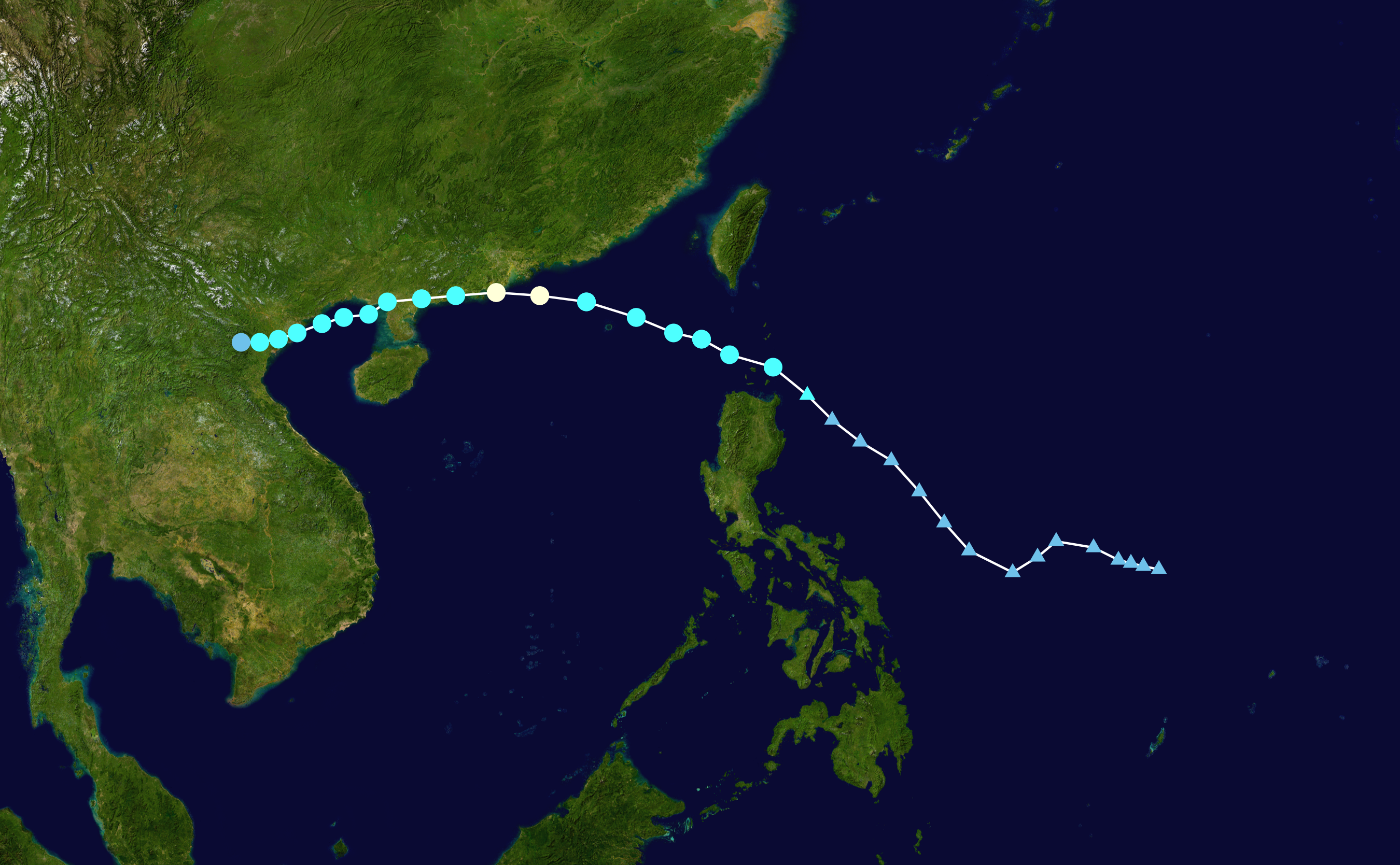
Map plotting the storm's track and intensity, according to the Saffir–Simpson scale Map key Saffir–Simpson scale Tropical depression (≤38 mph, ≤62 km/h) Tropical storm (39–73 mph, 63–118 km/h) Category 1 (74–95 mph, 119–153 km/h) Category 2 (96–110 mph, 154–177 km/h) Category 3 (111–129 mph, 178–208 km/h) Category 4 (130–156 mph, 209–251 km/h) Category 5 (≥157 mph, ≥252 km/h) Unknown Storm type Tropical cyclone Subtropical cyclone Extratropical cyclone, remnant low, tropical disturbance, or monsoon depression

A low-pressure area formed inside the PAR 1,040 km (650 mi) east of the Philippines on July 15. At 08:00 PHT (00:00 UTC) on July 16, the system developed into a tropical depression, which the Philippine Atmospheric, Geophysical and Astronomical Services Administration (PAGASA) named it Crising. The JTWC classified Crising as a monsoon depression due to its large circulation, before issuing a Tropical Cyclone Formation Alert (TCFA) as it continued to build up more cloud tops. At 23:00 PHT (15:00 UTC) that day, the PAGASA began raising Tropical Cyclone Wind Signals in parts of Luzon.

At 02:00 PHT (18:00 UTC) on July 18, Crising was upgraded into a tropical storm and named Wipha by the JMA. The storm later moved northwestward, passing near Santa Ana, Cagayan and then the Babuyan Islands as it continued to intensify. On July 19, the JTWC followed suit, upgrading the monsoon depression into a tropical storm and designated it as 09W. At 08:00 PHT (00:00 UTC) on the same day, Wipha was upgraded to a severe tropical storm.

Later, the JTWC reported that Wipha gradually intensified into a minimal typhoon due to favorable environmental conditions. At 17:50 CST (09:50 UTC) on July 20, the storm made landfall over Taishan, in Guangdong Province, China. After skirting through Guangdong, Wipha slowed down and slightly weakened into a tropical storm over Beihai, Guangxi Province, before entering the Gulf of Tonkin. On July 21, despite the weakening trend, satellite imagery continued to show Wipha as relatively well-organized, with well-defined convective bands wrapping into an obscured low-level circulation center (LLCC), and was reupgraded by the JMA to severe tropical storm status on July 22. At around 10:00 ICT (03:00 UTC), the storm moved through the Gulf of Tonkin, gradually weakening before making another landfall in the provinces of Hưng Yên and Ninh Bình in Vietnam (previously Thái Bình and Nam Định) on July 22. Shortly afterwards, the JTWC issued its final warning as Wipha continued to move inland. On July 23, the JMA also downgraded Wipha to a tropical depression, acknowledging that it had moved over land. Its remnants moved west-southwestward as it tracked on the southern periphery of the subtropical ridge to the north until it dissipated on that day.

The remnants of Wipha then entered the North Indian Ocean basin on July 24 and later intensified, becoming Depression BOB 04 on the next day.

== Preparations ==
=== Philippines ===
==== Highest Tropical Cyclone Wind Signal ====
Highest Tropical Cyclone Wind Signal issued by PAGASA for Wipha (Crising) in each province. The white line represents the best track.

On July 16, the National Disaster Risk Reduction and Management Council (NDRRMC) raised a blue alert for Wipha, while the Department of Health declared a white alert on July 19. When Wipha intensified into a tropical storm on July 18, PAGASA issued Tropical Cyclone Wind Signal No. 2 warnings over the entire provinces of Apayao, Babuyan Islands, Cagayan, Ilocos Norte, Isabela, Kalinga, eastern Ifugao and Mountain Province, northern and central Abra, and northern Ilocos Sur. Meanwhile, Tropical Cyclone Wind Signal No. 1 was hoisted for the entire provinces of Benguet, Camarines Norte, Catanduanes, La Union, Nueva Vizcaya, Polillo Islands, Quirino, northern Aurora, Camarines Sur, and Pangasinan, northeastern Nueva Ecija, and the rest of Abra, Ifugao, Ilocos Sur, and Mountain Province. Classes in some areas of the country were also suspended on July 18 and 19. The Philippine National Police deployed 3,000 personnel for rescue missions and placed 7,000 others on standby.

A yellow warning level was raised on the Chico River in Tabuk, Kalinga due to heavy rains. The Philippine Coast Guard suspended search operations for victims of the 2021–2022 Luzon sabungero disappearances in Taal Lake in Batangas. The Ipo, Ambuklao and Binga Dams opened their floodgates due to increased rainfall. A liquor ban was declared in Tuguegarao and Isabela, while a red alert was declared in Cagayan, with forced evacuations ordered in coastal municipalities.

=== Hong Kong ===
As Wipha continued threatening Hong Kong, the HKO issued a Standby Tropical Cyclone Signal No. 1 on July 18 and forecast that the storm would pass around 50 km (31 mi) south of the territory. As the storm edged closer to the territory, HKO raised to Northeast Gale or Storm Signal No. 8 at 00:20 HKT (16:20 UTC) on July 20. At least 515 flights in Chek Lap Kok International Airport were either canceled or delayed in preparation for the storm.

An Increasing Gale or Storm Signal No. 9 was issued at 07:20 HKT (23:20 UTC) as winds intensified and conditions deteriorated across Hong Kong. The warning was later upgraded to Hurricane Signal No. 10 at 09:20 HKT (01:20 UTC) on July 20, marking the first time the highest-level storm signal had been raised since Typhoon Saola back in September 2023. The highest signal was kept in force for more than six hours. As a result, all schools and non-essential public services were closed, emergency shelters were opened, and residents were advised to stay indoors and keep windows closed. Additionally, an Amber Rainstorm Warning and a Red Rainstorm Warning came successively into force from 15:10 HKT (07:10 UTC) to 18:10 (10:10 UTC), indicating that the intense rainbands associated with Wipha would continue to bring frequent and heavy downpours to the territory. As Wipha gradually moved away from the territory, the agency lowered the signal to the Southeast Gale or Storm Signal No. 8 at 16:10 HKT (08:10 UTC) before further downgrading it back to Strong Wind Signal No. 3 as the winds continued to weaken progressively. Shortly after that, all the warning signals were discontinued.

=== Macau ===
On July 18, the Macao Meteorological and Geophysical Bureau (SMG) warned that Wipha may skirt within 80 km (50 mi) of the territory. On July 20, the SMG hoisted a Signal No. 10 in Macau as it moved close to the territory. It was the first time the highest signal there was raised since Typhoon Saola in 2023. A yellow storm surge warning was also issued, stating that flooding of up to one metre (3 feet 3 inches) above road level may occur in low-lying areas.

=== Thailand ===
The Thai Meteorological Department issued a warning for heavy rainfall from Wipha in 41 provinces, including the capital Bangkok, and cautioned that waves of 2–4 m (6.6–13.1 ft) could affect coastal areas in the country.

== Impact ==
Casualties and damages by country
| Country | Deaths | Missing | Damages (USD) | Source |
|---|---|---|---|---|
| Philippines | (Note: According to the Philippine National Disaster Risk Reduction and Management Council: Tropical Storms Wipha (Crising), Francisco (Dante) and Comay (Emong) caused a total of 34 deaths and PHP21.4 billion (US$363 million) in damage.) | | | |
| Taiwan | 1 | 0 | $488,000 | |
| China | 2 | 10 | $272 million | |
| Hong Kong | | | $257 million | |
| Vietnam | 7 | 2 | $183 million | |
| Laos | 4 | 4 | $5 million | |
| Thailand | 2 | 0 | Unknown | |
| Cambodia | Unknown | Unknown | Unknown | |
| Myanmar | 4 | Unknown | Unknown | |
| Total | >20 | 16 | >$717 million | |

=== Philippines ===
Wipha (known locally as Crising), combined with the subsequent Tropical Storm Francisco (Dante) and Typhoon Co-may (Emong), helped enhance the southwest monsoon, triggered floods in the Philippines and affecting more than 9.5 million people, of which 193,000 were displaced. The storm killed 40 people, including nine in Metro Manila, eight in Calabarzon, six in Western Visayas, three in Ilocos Region, Northern Mindanao, Cordillera Administrative Region and Negros Island Region, two each in Central Luzon, Mimaropa, Bicol and Cagayan Valley, and one each in Bangsamoro, Davao and Caraga Regions, with 33 more injured and eight others missing. Damages from Wipha reached ₱19.66 billion (US$399.28 million), while 161 roads and 17 bridges were rendered impassable. Around 8,466 houses were destroyed, while 64,593 others were damaged. Power outages occurred in 76 cities and municipalities. More than 100 domestic flights were canceled, stranding 8,695 passengers, while 1,280 people and 118 vessels were stranded in 42 ports nationwide. But according to NDRRMC, total damage by Wipha, Francisco and Co-may reached ₱16.51 billion (US$335.15 million) in infrastructure and ₱4.86 billion (US$98.61 million) in agriculture for a total of ₱21.36 billion (US$433.77 million).

A state of calamity was declared in Bataan, Caloocan, Cavite, Dagupan, La Union, Laguna, Las Piñas, Malabon, Marikina, Muntinlupa, Navotas, Negros Occidental, Occidental Mindoro, Oriental Mindoro, Pampanga, Quezon City, Rizal and Valenzuela as well as in parts of Antique, Batangas, Bulacan, Palawan, Pangasinan, and Tarlac due to flooding and landslides caused by the storm. In Umingan, Pangasinan, the flooding was exacerbated by an irrigation gate that had been left open and the diversion of floodwaters to irrigation canals after a riverside floodgate was left closed. In Benguet, a rockslide occurred in Kennon Road, rendering two sections impassable. A large boulder broke free from a mountainside which destroyed a car and crashed into a house in Baguio, killing a pet dog. In Buguey, Cagayan, fish stocks valued at ₱5 million (US$101,522.84) were forcibly harvested and bought by the local government after heavy rains adversely affected the salinity of fish cages, while a dock partially collapsed in San Francisco, Southern Leyte. Three people were injured in a landslide in Antique. Two ships collided in Calbayog, Samar, while a barge ran aground in Virac, Catanduanes. Three barges also ran aground in Calaca, Batangas. Strong winds toppled a billboard and a utility pole along Katipunan Avenue in Quezon City, hitting several vehicles, while a tornado damaged a tricycle and destroyed a shack in Calasiao, Pangasinan. Floodwaters inundated the San Agustin Church, a designated World Heritage Site by UNESCO in Manila.

The United States pledged ₱13.8 million (US$280,203.05) in humanitarian aid to the Philippines to be disbursed through the World Food Programme. The US military sent aircraft to deliver aid.

=== Taiwan ===
The outer bands of Wipha struck Taiwan, producing heavy winds and rain on the island. One pedestrian was killed in a car accident on Provincial Highway 9 in Hualien County, which was partly blamed on the storm's effects. On July 19, 620 mm (24 in) of rain was recorded in Beinan, Taitung and 523 mm (20.6 in) in Yuli, Hualien. Flooding resulted in suspensions at the Taiwan Railway in Luye, and many rockslides blocked parts of the Southern Cross-Island Highway and the South-link line. A massive landslide measuring 6 km (3.7 mi) by 2 km (1.2 mi) struck Wanrong, Hualien on July 21, registering as a M_{s} 4.9 earthquake by the United States Geological Survey (USGS). This landslide formed a barrier lake known as the Matai'an Creek Barrier Lake, which overflowed and collapsed two months later during Typhoon Ragasa in September, killing 17 people and leaving another 17 missing. Total agricultural and infrastructural damage reached NT$15.32 million (US$488,302).

=== Hong Kong ===
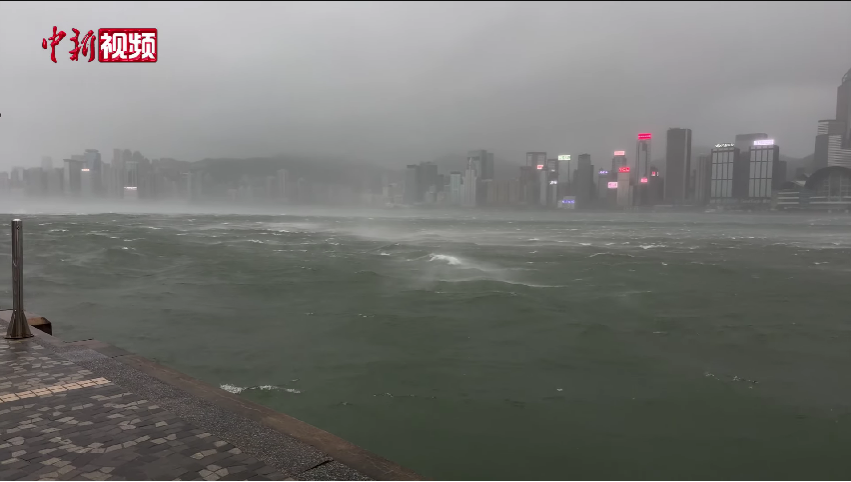
The Victoria Harbour view after the HKO issued Hurricane Signal No. 10 on July 20

At least 33 people sought medical treatment, 711 reports of fallen trees were received and 277 people sought evacuation. Partial flooding was reported at a shopping center as a result of the torrential rains and strong winds brought by the storm. Due to the effects of the storm, on July 20, the Hong Kong Observatory issued a red rainstorm signal at 15:45 HKT (07:45 UTC). On July 22, another amber rainstorm signal was issued at 20:00 HKT (12:00 UTC). Sources said that the estimated nominal damages of the storm in Hong Kong could reach of up to HK$2 billion (US$257.4 million) when it struck the territory on July 20.

=== Macau ===
140 flights were reportedly canceled while 13 other flights were rescheduled in Macau International Airport. Five people were injured by the storm in the territory.

=== China ===
Flooding caused by heavy rains related to Wipha killed two people and left 10 others missing in Shandong Province, where homes were damaged and villages were cut off. In Jinan, 364 mm (14.3 in) of rain was recorded, flooding two villages and damaging 19 homes. Damage in China reached 1.91 billion yuan (US$272 million).

=== Vietnam ===
The province of Nghệ An was severely affected by the storm. In the province, five people died due to flooding, landslides, and fallen trees. The communes of Mỹ Lý, Nhôn Mai, Mường Xén and Tri Lễ were heavily affected. Four others were injured, and 3,654 homes were damaged or flooded. Total economic damages reached 3.767 trillion VND (US$149.3 million) as of August 6. Damage by the storm reported in Ninh Bình Province was estimated at 386.15 billion VND (US$15.3 million) and in Thanh Hóa province reached 382 billion VND (US$15.1 million). The remnants of the storm caused heavy rain in Đồng Tháp Province and damage was estimated at 21.2 billion VND (US$840,000). Total damage reached 4.6 trillion dong (US$183 million). Flood flow at Bản Vẽ Reservoir reached up to 12800 m^{3}/s on the morning of 23 July, exceeding the designed limit by 1.5 times, this was assessed as a "5,000-year event".

In Phú Thọ, strong winds and heavy rains killed one person and damaged 304 homes, nine schools, a health center, and an administrative building. Lạng Sơn recorded one fatality and 165 damaged buildings. One death was also reported in Tân Lạc district, Hòa Bình province. In Hanoi, 941 downed trees and fallen branches were reported, blocking roads and affecting traffic in the city. Four people were also injured in Thanh Hóa and Lâm Đồng province. In Thái Nguyên province, one person died after a wall collapsed, another was injured and 261 homes were damaged, with an additional 40 homes damaged in Cao Bằng province. Two fishermen were left missing, 58 boats sank and 154 homes were damaged in Hà Tĩnh province. The capsizing of the Wonder Sea tourist boat in Ha Long Bay, which occurred shortly before Wipha entered the South China Sea, was eventually deemed to be unrelated to the storm.

=== Thailand ===
Despite being far from the storm, the island of Phuket and the nearby Krabi province were affected by strong winds attributed to Wipha. One woman was killed and another was injured by a falling tree in Phuket, while another man was swept out to sea while swimming and drowned; both fatalities were Chinese tourists. The island of Koh Samui was also battered by heavy rains and strong winds from Wipha.

The remnants of Wipha triggered flooding in the provinces of Chiang Mai, Nan, Chiang Rai, and Udon Thani. At least 130 homes were damaged in Nan Province.

=== Laos ===
Severe flooding reported in Luang Prabang, Phongsaly, Xiangkhouang, Vientiane, Houaphanh and several other regions across northern Laos. Across 34 districts and 262 villages in the country, four people were killed, six suffered injuries, four were left missing, affected 15,000 families and damaged more than 2,200 homes, of which 183 were destroyed. Damage in Khammouane Province reached 108 billion LAK (US$5 million).

=== Myanmar ===
Heavy rains related to Wipha caused severe flooding in Myawaddy, with water levels in the Great Tenasserim River rising by over 1 m (3.3 ft), raising concerns about potential destruction to homes in the area. A dam collapsed due to rising water levels in the Sittaung River, exacerbating flooding in the town of Madauk. Floods killed four people and reportedly caused extensive damage in Mong Pawk.

=== Elsewhere ===
Wipha brought heavy rainfall in Cambodia, with more than 104,0 millimeters of rainfall recorded over the part of Coastal area at Tatai and Koh Kong District on 20 July. The remnants of Wipha reintensified into Depression BOB 04 in the North Indian Ocean. As a result, Kolkata recorded 186 mm (7.3 in) of rain in 15 hours from July 24 to 25, while Alipore recorded 120 mm (4.7 in) in 24 hours. Gusts of 50 km/h (31 mph; 27 kn) and flooding was recorded in the city.

== Retirement ==
Due to the high amount of damage and fatalities, the ESCAP/WMO Typhoon Committee announced that the name Wipha, along with seven others, would be retired from the rotating naming lists for the Western Pacific on the 58th Session in March 2026. Its replacement name will be announced in 2027.

On March 19, 2026, PAGASA retired the name Crising from its rotating naming lists due to the damage and loss of life it caused; and will never be used again as a typhoon name within the PAR. It will be replaced with Chico, a fruit-bearing tree.

== See also ==
- Weather of 2025
- Tropical cyclones in 2025

Other similar typhoons:

- Typhoon Nuri (2008) – a stronger typhoon that passed north of the Philippines, later weakening before striking Hong Kong and Macau
- Tropical Storm Haima (2011) – had a similar track.
- Typhoon Vicente (2012) – a powerful Category 4 typhoon that affected Hong Kong and Macau, then made landfall in Guangdong, China
- Tropical Storm Nida (2016) – a storm with similar strength that occurred at about the same time of year, also affecting Hong Kong and Macau
- Typhoon Hato (2017) – a strong typhoon that also hit Hong Kong and Macau, causing severe damage
- Tropical Storm Wipha (2019) – a tropical storm with the same name and similar track
- Typhoon Cempaka (2021)
- Typhoon Yagi (2024) – had a similar track to Wipha
