= Hong Kong tropical cyclone warning signals =

Weather alerts in Hong Kong

- Traditional Chinese: 熱帶氣旋警告信號
Transcriptions
Standard Mandarin
- Hanyu Pinyin: rèdài qìxuán jǐnggào xìnhào
Yue: Cantonese
- Yale Romanization: Yiht daai hei syùhn gíng gou seun houh
- Jyutping: Jit6 daai3 hei3 syun4 ging2 gou3 seon3 hou6

Typhoon signals
- Traditional Chinese: 風球
- Literal meaning: Typhoon signal
Transcriptions
Standard Mandarin
- Hanyu Pinyin: fēngqiú
Yue: Cantonese
- Yale Romanization: Fūng kàuh
- Jyutping: Fung1 kau4
- Sidney Lau: Fung^{1} kau^{4}

Hong Kong tropical cyclone warning signals are issued by the Hong Kong Observatory to warn of a potential threat or effects of a tropical cyclone in the greater Hong Kong area. The signals are represented with a set of numbers and symbols. Previously, lights were also used at night.

The warning system currently in use in Hong Kong is based on a signal level from the lowest level, Standby Signal No. 1, to the highest level, Hurricane Signal No. 10. The signalled numbers may change in accordance with the conditions. Once any signal that is higher than No. 3 is issued, government agencies, schools, financial markets, and most of the private sector close their operations. When Signal No. 9 or No. 10 is issued, the Mass Transit Railway (MTR) ceases operations in the above ground open-air areas of the heavy rail network, as well as suspending the Light Rail.

During large tropical cyclones such as Typhoon Hato in 2017, Typhoon Mangkhut in 2018 and Typhoon Ragasa in 2025, public transit was suspended and schools and businesses were closed.

== History ==
=== Beginning ===
In May 1884, the Hong Kong Observatory began warning of surrounding tropical cyclones by notifying newspapers and telegraph companies. Later that year, the observatory implemented the first visual warning system in August. It used an arrangement of red drums, cones, and balls to indicate the presence of a tropical cyclone around Hong Kong and its relative position. The signal was hoisted on a mast in front of the Tsim Sha Tsui Police Barracks. Sailors primarily used it to help plot their course. The signal did not indicate any threat of a typhoon directly impacting Hong Kong.

In August 1884, the Hong Kong Observatory began using a typhoon gun to warn residents of hazardous wind conditions. One shot was fired to indicate when strong gales were expected. Two were fired when hurricane-force winds were expected and the gun was fired again each time the wind changed direction. Initially, the same gun was also used to announce mail deliveries from London. This caused confusion for residents, so in 1886, the use of guns for mail deliveries was discontinued.

==== Revised visual signal ====
In 1890, a black colour began to be used with the drum, cone, and ball visual signal to indicate the distance of a storm from Hong Kong. Red continued to be used for storms at least 300 km away, while black was used for storms closer than 300 km.

In February 1897, the storm signals created by Admiral Robert FitzRoy in 1861 were introduced in Hong Kong with a minor modification. The modified storm warning system consisted of storm signals in the form of a cone or drum and night signals. A cone pointing upward was hoisted to warn of gales from the north or east, while a cone pointing downward warned of gales from the south or west. A drum was added to the cone when a strong gale that might reach hurricane force was expected. The night signal consisted of three differently-coloured lanterns hung on a triangular frame, pointing upwards or downwards. No lanterns were hoisted to represent the drum.

=== First Numbered System ===
In 1917, Hong Kong first began using numbered signals. The new system consisted of seven signals (No. 1–7). Signal No. 1 was used as a standby signal, Signals No. 2–5 were respectively used for gales coming from each cardinal direction (north, south, east, and west), Signal No. 6 for gales of increasing force, and Signal No. 7 for hurricane-force winds.

=== Second Numbered System ===
In 1931, the system was revised, increasing the amount of signals from 7 to 10. Signal No. 1 was still used as a standby signal,. Signal No. 2 and 3 were used for strong winds from the Southwest and Southeast respectively, however Signal No. 2 became obsolete in 1935 and No. 3 between 1935-1955 before being adopted as the current Strong Wind Signal No. 3 in 1956. Signal No. 4 was for strong typhoons that did not pose imminent danger locally, however it was not applicable to Hong Kong. Signal No. 5-8 were used for gales from the Northwest, Southwest, Northeast and Southeast respectively. Signal No. 9 replaced the old Signal No. 6 while Signal No. 10 replaced the old Signal No. 7.

=== History ===
In 1917, a numbered signal system was implemented for warning wind conditions in the territory.

Hong Kong island	Kowloon	New Territories East	New Territories West	Outlying islands
Marine Department Signal Station, Connaught Road Central	Hong Kong Observatory	Rennie's Mill Police Station, Junk Bay	Tsuen Wan, Caltex Depot	Waglan Island
	Blackhead Hill	Sha Tin Police Station		Cheung Chau Police Station
Green Island Signal Station		Sai Kung Police Station		Hei Ling Chau Police Station
Lei Yue Mun Fort	Kowloon Wharf and Godown Company Signal Tower^		Castle Peak Police Station	Mui Wo Police Station, Lantau Island
Tamar	Kowloon Railway Station Clock Tower*	Tai Po District Office	Ping Shan Police Station	Shek Pik Police Post, Lantau Island
	Kowloon Hospital, Argyle Street			Tai O Police Station, Lantau Island
Aberdeen Police Station	Kowloon Docks, Big Crane*	Sha Tau Kok, Medical Department Clinic		
Stanley Village Police Station	Kwun Tong, Shell Oil Company Installation		Pat Heung Police Station	
Stanley Fort (near Measured Mile Marks)	Stonecutters Island, W/T mast*		Lok Ma Chau Police Station	
	Lai Chi Kok, Stanvac Installation			

- ^ = day signals only
- * = night signals only

In 1963, a visual signal was completed at Lau Fau Shan Police Station in Deep Bay. Night stations were installed at the San Miguel Brewery in Sham Tseng and the Port Signal Station at North Point. In 1964, a storm signal station established at the Marine Licensing Office, Shau Kei Wan, was brought into operation. In 1965, storm signal stations, displaying both day and night signals were established at the Marine Police Operations Bases at Tai Po Kau and Tai Lam Chung, at the Plover Cove Police Station, and at Divisional Police Headquarters, Yuen Long.

Signal stations at the Mobil Oil Depot Lai Chi Kok and at Hei Ling Chau Police Station ceased operation. In 1967, a signal station was established at Peng Chau Police Station. The number of signal stations in Hong Kong peaked at 42 according to the Observatory's 1968–1969 annual report. Aberdeen Police Station was vacated in October 1969. The station at Marine Department Headquarters was moved to Port Communication Centre in April 1970. The station at Cheung Chau Police Station was moved to the meteorological station in 1971.

=== Closing progressively ===
In 1983, only 15 signal stations were retained to provide visual display of signals, mainly to vessels in or near the harbour.

Hong Kong island	Kowloon	New Territories East	New Territories West	Outlying islands
Marine Department Port Communication Centre				Waglan Island
Shau Kei Wan Marine Licensing Office				Cheung Chau Aeronautical Meteorological Station
Green Island Signal Station	Yau Ma Tei Cargo Working Area Building	Sai Kung Police Station	Tai Lam Chung Marine Police Operations Base	
		Tai Po Kau Marine Police Operations Base		
Tamar				
			Lau Fau Shan Police Station, Deep Bay	Tai O Police Station, Lantau Island
Aberdeen Marine Licensing Office		Sha Tau Kok Police Post		
Stanley Village Police Station				

The signal stations at Waglan Island and Marine Department Port Communication Centre ceased to operate with effect from 30 June 1988. The signal station at Green Island ceased to operate with effect from 15 October 1989.

=== Decommissioning ===
Starting on 1 April 2000, signals would no longer be hoisted at the signal stations at Aberdeen Marine Office, Sha Tau Kok Sewage Treatment Works and Tai Lam Small Boat Unit Headquarters; from 21 April 2001, signals would no longer be hoisted at the signal station at Lau Fau Shan Police Station; and from 1 January 2002, signals would no longer be hoisted at the signal station at Cheung Chau Aeronautical Meteorological Station.

== Current system ==
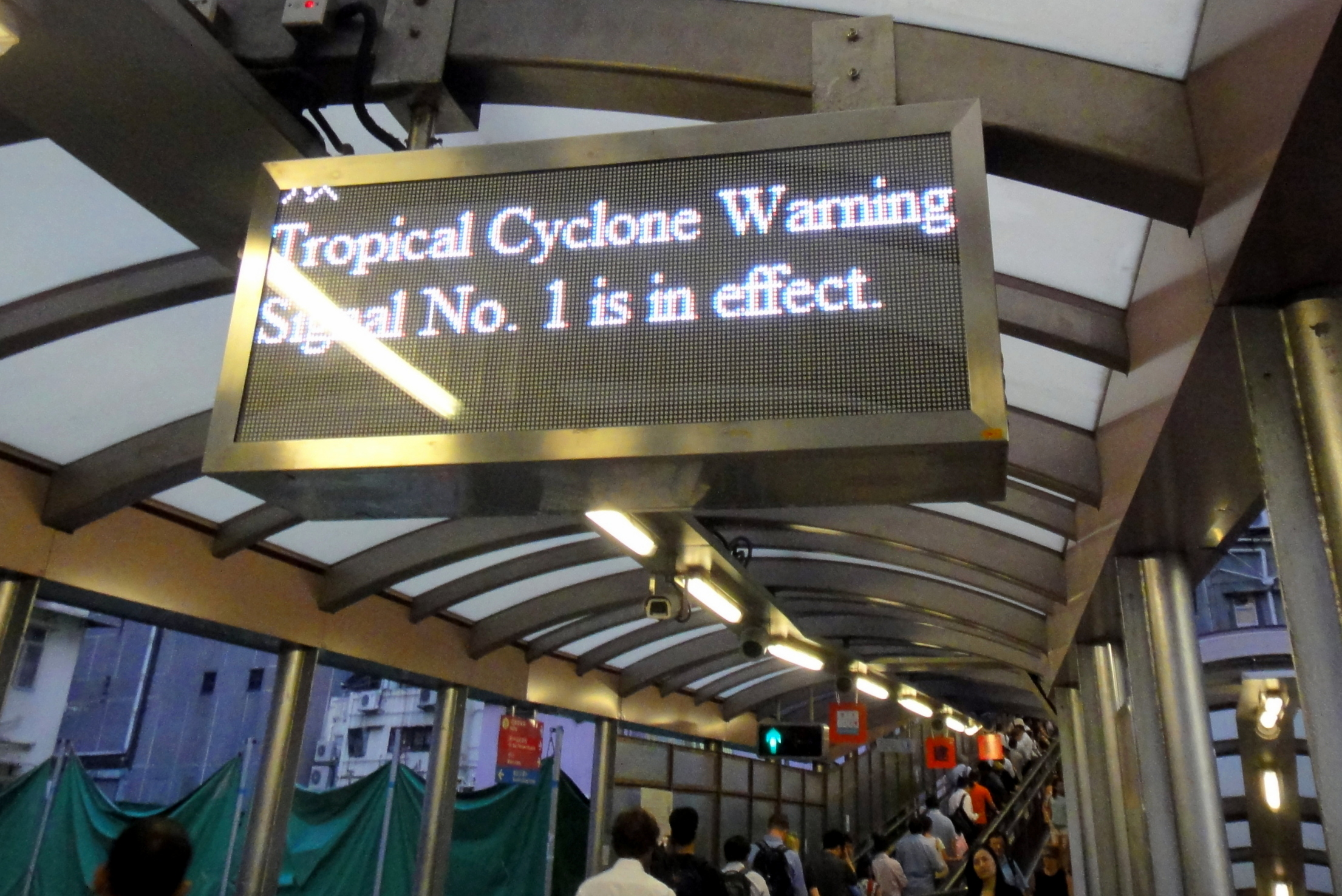
Typhoon warning signal No. 1 shown at the Mid-Level escalators

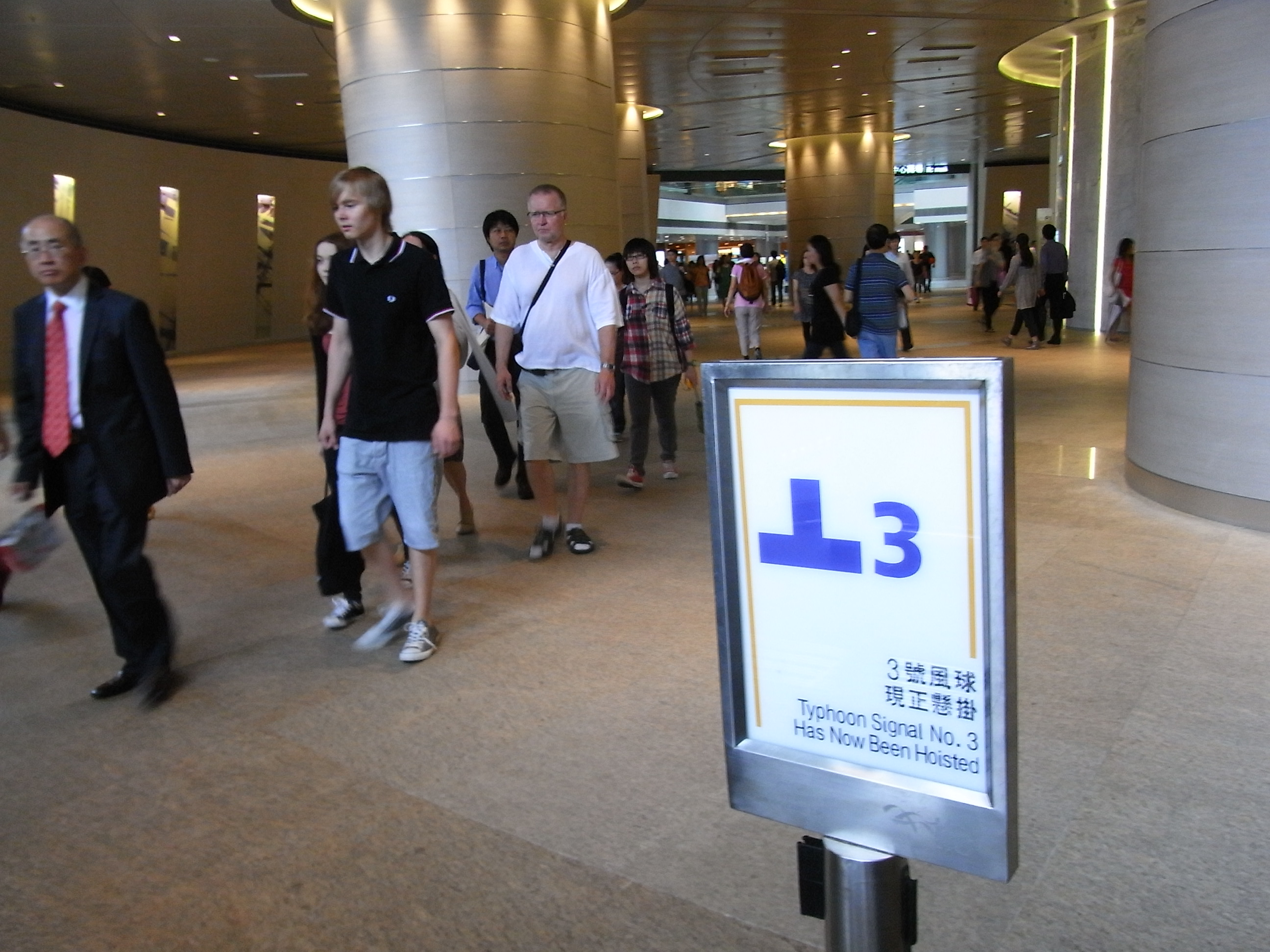
Typhoon warning Signal No. 3 shown at Hong Kong station. This warning was likely issued for Tropical Storm Talim (2012).

In accordance with legal codes and customs in Hong Kong, once any signal higher than No. 3 is issued, all government agencies shut down their operations. Schools, financial markets, and most of the private sector closes. Non-essential workers are released from work in a staggered manner so as to avoid overwhelming public transportation. Public transit agencies generally continue to operate initially but may cease operation at short notice. The Hong Kong Observatory has since 1987 issued warnings two hours in advance of the issuance of the No. 8 warning signal.

=== Criticism ===
In its early days, the system relied upon wind speeds measured around Victoria Harbour. As the emphasis shifted to serving the urbanised populace, such observations were seen as lacking relevance. The Hong Kong Observatory was criticised during Typhoon Prapiroon in 2006, when conditions in urban areas were much more severe than those on the harbour, which had justified only a No. 3 signal being issued. In response, in 2007, the Hong Kong Observatory broadened its network to eight near-sea-level reference anemometers around Hong Kong.

According to the new system, the No. 3 and No. 8 signals will be issued when half or more anemometers in the reference network register sustained winds of 41 to 62 km/h (25 to 39 mph) and 63 to 117 km/h (39 to 73 mph) respectively. In 2013, Lau Fau Shan replaced Wetland Park as a reference anemometer station. The current eight reference anemometer stations include Cheung Chau, Hong Kong International Airport, Sai Kung, Kai Tak, Lau Fau Shan, Tsing Yi Shell Oil Depot, Sha Tin, and Ta Kwu Ling.

=== Signal No. 10 occurrences ===
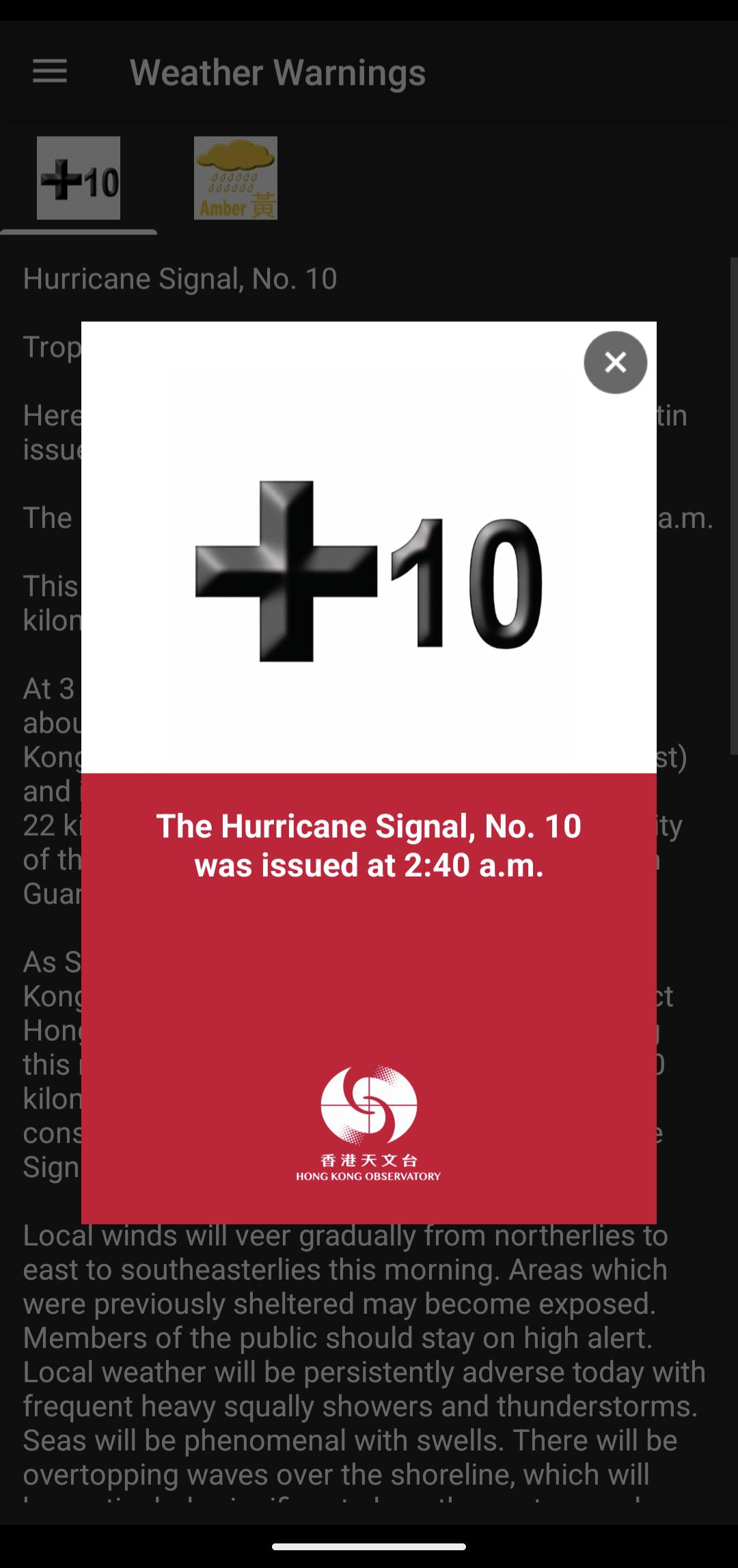
The Hong Kong Observatory App displays Hurricane Signal No. 10 for Typhoon Ragasa.

When Typhoon Hato hit Hong Kong in August 2017, Signal No. 10 was issued, leading to flights being suspended or cancelled. Flights later resumed as soon as it was safe, including throughout the night to make up for lost time. MTR cancelled train services in open sections of the line and maintained a limited service underground on an adjusted schedule. All schools were closed for the day, and the government opened temporary shelters. Trees fell and flooding occurred. The stock market (and other businesses) were suspended for part or a whole day.

When Typhoon Mangkhut hit Hong Kong in September 2018 with Signal No. 10 being issued, all of the aforementioned closure happened. The Hong Kong Observatory and the Hong Kong Government advised people to put masking tape on their windows to try and stop their windows from being blown away.

2025 saw Signal No. 10 issued twice that year, the first time being on July 20 when Tropical Storm Wipha was preparing to make landfall. Over 500 flights were cancelled as a result, along with the MTR limiting services. The second instance occurred on September 24, at 02:40 HKT, when Signal No. 10 was issued for Typhoon Ragasa, while the storm was 120 km (75 mi) from Hong Kong. This made Ragasa the furthest typhoon from Hong Kong to ever trigger the signal and the first time that Signal No. 10 was triggered when a storm was more than 100 km (62 mi) away from Hong Kong, surpassing the old record of 100 km held jointly by Typhoon Mangkhut in 2018 and Typhoon Vicente in 2012. The Signal No. 10 was in force for 10 hours and 40 minutes, second only to the record of 11 hours set during the passage of Tropical Storm York in 1999.

== Meaning of signals ==
The Saffir–Simpson hurricane wind scale is a classification used for some Western Hemisphere tropical cyclones. Hong Kong has similar official five-level definition warning signals, which use descriptions of winds taken from the Beaufort Scale. The Hong Kong levels, however, do not correspond to the Beaufort Scale, which has 12 levels.

The lowest level of the Hong Kong system No. 1 does not correspond to any wind strength. Instead, it is an alert based on the distance of a storm. The highest level, Hurricane Signal No. 10, is issued infrequently. There have been 19 No. 10 warnings since 1946. From the 1980s to 2000s, two No. 10 signals were issued, for Typhoon Ellen in 1983 and Typhoon York in 1999. Six of such signals have occurred since 2010: for Typhoon Vicente in 2012, Typhoon Hato in 2017, Typhoon Mangkhut in 2018, Typhoon Saola in 2023, Severe Tropical Storm Wipha in July 2025, and Typhoon Ragasa in September 2025.

Signal numbers will change in accordance with the conditions. The Hong Kong Observatory website gives live updates of issue and cancel times for signals.

Signal number	Signal name	Symbol	Meaning
1	Standby (戒備)		No. 1 signal is an advisory signal for when there is a tropical cyclone centred within about 800 kilometres of Hong Kong. If strong winds are not expected within 24 hours, the issuance of the signal may be delayed. In very rare cases, the signal may be issued when a tropical cyclone is still beyond 800 km from Hong Kong. This normally occurs when a typhoon with a high moving speed is expected to have a severe impact on Hong Kong even at a distance, such as Typhoon Mangkhut in 2018.
3	Strong Wind (強風)		No. 3 signal is a warning that a tropical cyclone is expected to come near enough to Hong Kong to cause strong winds in Hong Kong. Strong winds range from 41 to 62 kilometres per hour, but gusts may exceed 110 kilometres per hour. The signal normally gives about 12 hours warning of strong winds over Hong Kong at sea level.
8NW	Gale or Storm (烈風或暴風)		No. 8 signals give warning of a gale or storm from one of the four quadrants. A gale ranges from 63 to 87 kilometres per hour and storm from 88 to 117 kilometres per hour. Gusts may exceed 180 kilometres per hour. The timing of the issuance of the first of these signals is aimed to give about 12 hours warning of gales generally over Hong Kong near sea level, but the warning may be shorter for exposed areas and on high ground. Unexpected intensification of the tropical cyclone on accelerated movement closer to Hong Kong may reduce the warning period. When one of these signals is issued, ferries generally stop running and all schools and law courts are closed.
8SW	Gale or Storm (烈風或暴風)		
8NE	Gale or Storm (烈風或暴風)		
8SE	Gale or Storm (烈風或暴風)		
9	Increasing Gale or Storm (烈風或暴風風力增強)		No. 9 signal indicates that the centre of a typhoon will soon pass close to Hong Kong, with the consequent shifting of wind direction. Alternatively, the signal generally implies that the wind speed has already reached gale to storm force (63 to 117 kilometres per hour) and has a chance of increasing to hurricane force in a short period of time. Hence, the signal is not issued for severe tropical storms, but may be maintained after a typhoon weakens into a severe tropical storm.
10	Hurricane (颶風)		No. 10 signal gives warning of a hurricane-force wind. Hurricane-force winds range upwards from 118 kilometres per hour but gusts may exceed 220 kilometres per hour. This signal implies that the centre of a typhoon will hit Hong Kong directly or pass close enough to bring hurricane-force winds anywhere near sea level in Hong Kong within a short time of the issuance of the signal.

=== Hong Kong Observatory public guidance ===
The Hong Kong Observatory has given public guidance when signals are given. This includes:

- When signal 1 is issued, to take into account in planning activities of a tropical cyclone and to be aware that strong winds may occur over offshore waters.
- When signal 3 is issued, secure all loose objects, particularly on balconies and roof tops.
- When signal 8 is issued, complete all precautions (such as secure all loose objects) before gales commence.
- When signal 9 or 10 is issued, stay indoors and away from exposed windows and doors to avoid flying debris.

== Macau counterpart ==
In Macau, the territory's Meteorological and Geophysical Bureau maintains a very similar system. The bureau has maintained the practice of hoisting the warning signals (as well as its nighttime light signals), even as Hong Kong abandoned the practice in 2002. The signals are hoisted at Guia Fortress and the Fortaleza do Monte. In 2017, Typhoon Hato also reached Signal number 10, but Macau raised the signal late, hours after Hong Kong.

== See also ==
- Hong Kong rainstorm warning signals
- Hong Kong Observatory
