= Typhoon Hope (1979) =

Pacific typhoon in 1979

Typhoon Hope (Ising)
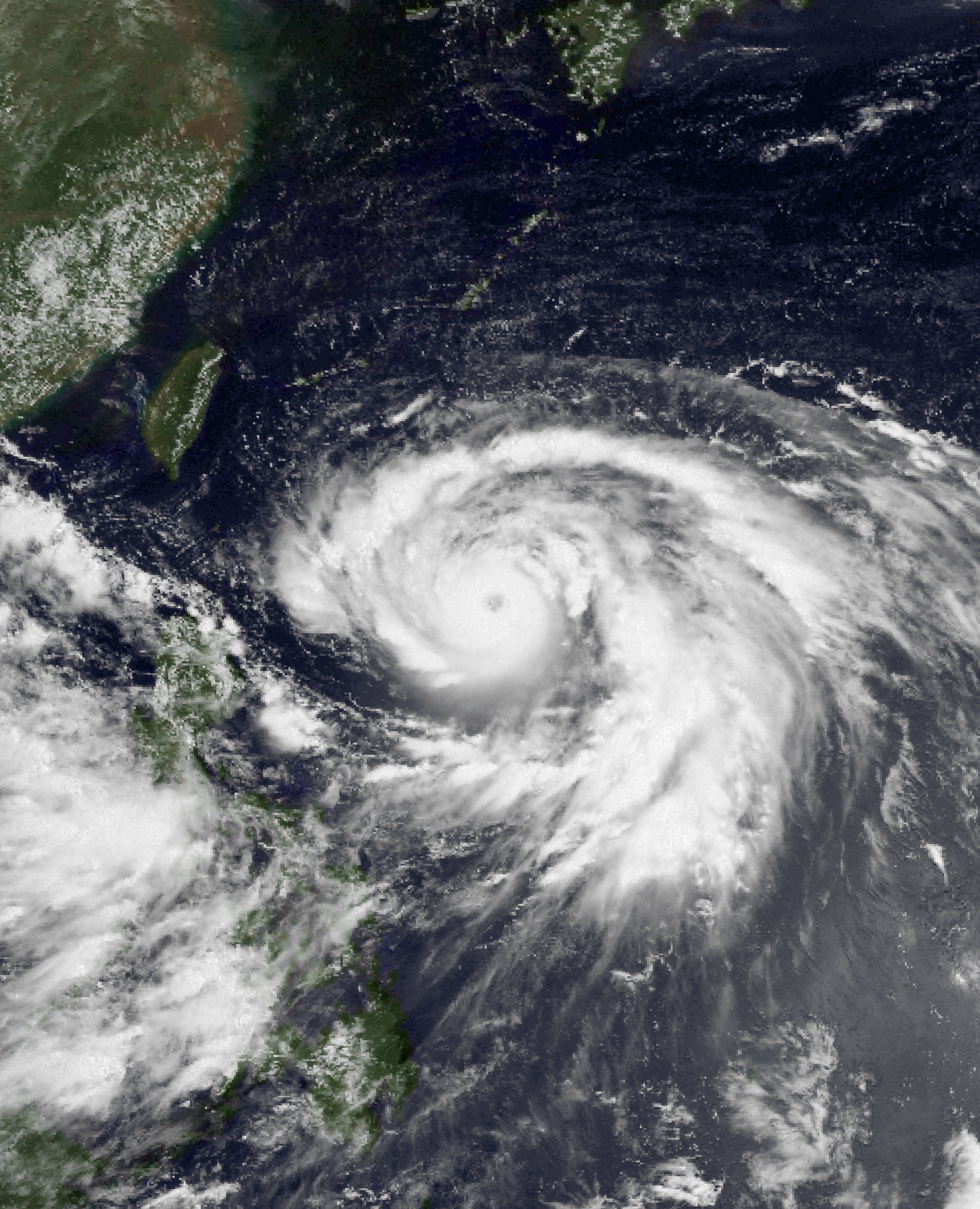
- Typhoon Hope at peak intensity on July 31

Meteorological history
- Formed: July 24, 1979
- Dissipated: August 3, 1979

Violent typhoon
- 10-minute sustained (JMA)
- Highest winds: 205 km/h (125 mph)
- Lowest pressure: 900 hPa (mbar); 26.58 inHg

Category 4-equivalent super typhoon
- 1-minute sustained (SSHWS/JTWC)
- Highest winds: 240 km/h (150 mph)
- Lowest pressure: 898 hPa (mbar); 26.52 inHg

Overall effects
- Fatalities: 112 total
- Damage: Unknown
- Areas affected: Guam, Philippines, Taiwan, China, Hong Kong, Macao, Vietnam, Laos
- Part of the 1979 Pacific typhoon season

Typhoon Hope, known in the Philippines as Typhoon Ising, was a powerful typhoon that killed over 100 people when it struck Hong Kong in 1979. The fifth typhoon and first super typhoon of the 1979 Pacific typhoon season, it formed as a tropical depression southeast of Guam on July 24. It headed to the west-northwest, but upper-level shear from the TUTT caused the depression to dissipate on the 27th. It turned northward then westward, where it regenerated on the 28th. Intensification became more steady, with the depression reaching storm strength on the 28th and typhoon strength on the 29th. On the 31st, Hope reached a peak of 150 mph winds, but land interaction with Taiwan to the north weakened the storm.

On August 2, Typhoon Hope struck southern China, only 10 miles east of Hong Kong. It weakened over the country while moving westward, but retained its satellite signature until dissipating on the 3rd. In Guangdong Province in China, the typhoon was responsible for around 100 deaths or missing people. Twelve people died along with 260 injured in Hong Kong. Typhoon Hope was the most intense typhoon to hit Hong Kong since Typhoon Rose of the 1971 season.

== Meteorological history ==
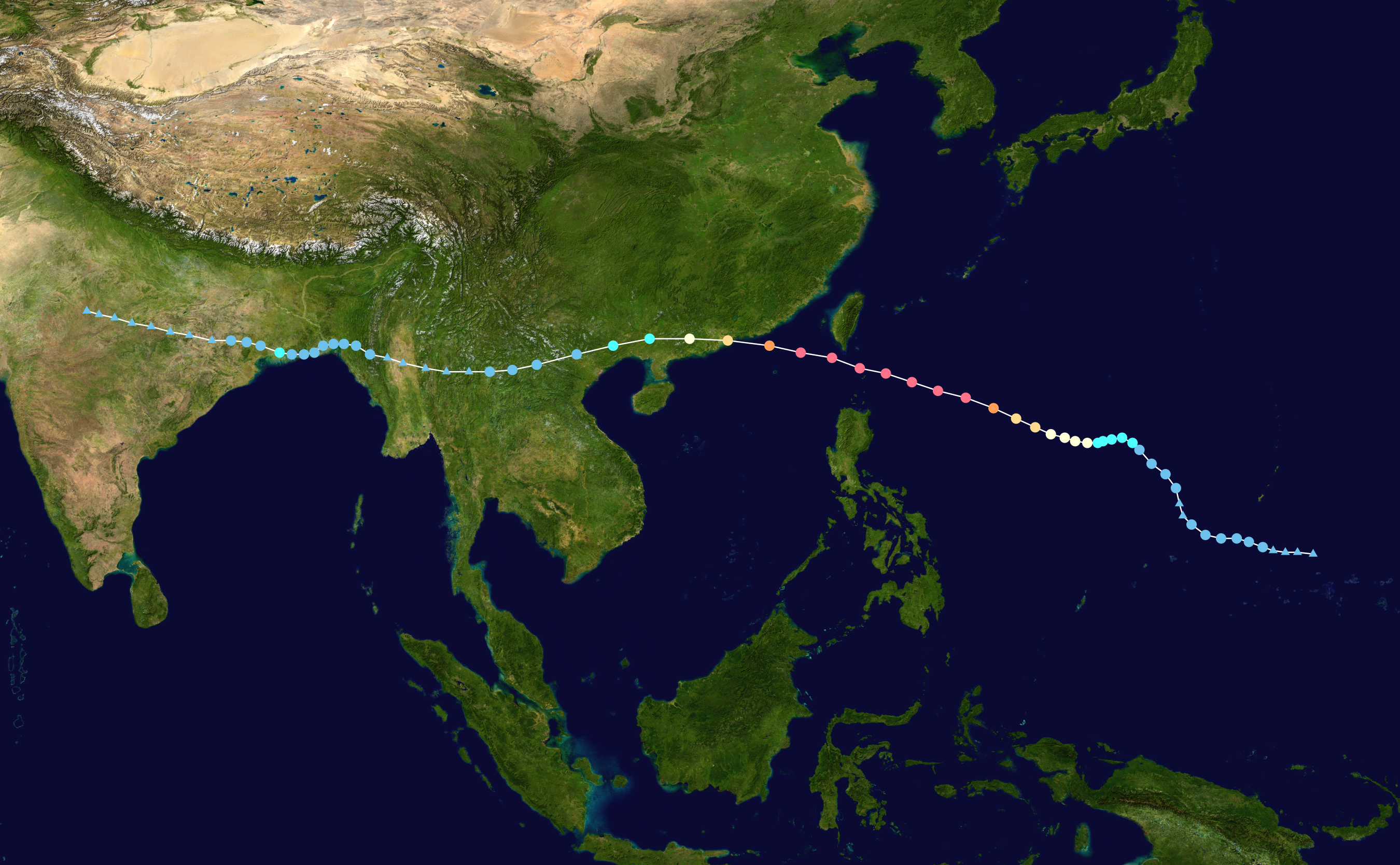
Map plotting the storm's track and intensity, according to the Saffir–Simpson scale Map key Saffir–Simpson scale Tropical depression (≤38 mph, ≤62 km/h) Tropical storm (39–73 mph, 63–118 km/h) Category 1 (74–95 mph, 119–153 km/h) Category 2 (96–110 mph, 154–177 km/h) Category 3 (111–129 mph, 178–208 km/h) Category 4 (130–156 mph, 209–251 km/h) Category 5 (≥157 mph, ≥252 km/h) Unknown Storm type Tropical cyclone Subtropical cyclone Extratropical cyclone, remnant low, tropical disturbance, or monsoon depression

Super Typhoon Hope began as a weak tropical disturbance on July 25 about 180 nautical miles (330 kilometers) south of Guam. It started moving westwards for a day and then moved northwest without much development for the next two days. The maximum sustained winds were only about 25 mph (40 km/h) during that period. On the morning of July 28, it intensified to a tropical depression. While the system slowly moved west, the storm intensified to a tropical storm in the early hours of July 29, and the Joint Typhoon Warning Center (JTWC) assigned the system the name Hope.

At 6:20 in the evening on July 29, a reconnaissance aircraft reported that the minimum central pressure had dropped to 972 millibars (hPa; 28.7 inHg) and maximum sustained winds reached 80 miles per hour (130 km/h). The system continued to rapidly intensify and became a typhoon on the JMA scale. Hope gradually accelerated and by early morning of July 31. On that day the minimum central pressure dropped to 925 millibars. The eye became well-organized and continued to go under explosive deepening. By the evening of July 31, the maximum sustained winds had risen to 150 mph (240 km/h), equivalent to a Category 4 super typhoon.

On August 1, Typhoon Hope reached maximum intensity with maximum sustained winds of 150 mph (240 km/h) and a minimum central pressure reading of 900 millibars by the Joint Typhoon Warning Center (JTWC). (Note: The Joint Typhoon Warning Center is a joint United States Navy – United States Air Force task force that issues tropical cyclone warnings for the western Pacific Ocean and other regions.) At 1:00 pm that day, the system passed within 15 nautical miles of Batan.

Hope was closest to the Republic of China in the afternoon. Gales and heavy rain associated with the typhoon caused much damage there. In the eastern part of the island, numerous houses were destroyed and many houses were completely wiped out. Farmlands and ponds suffered much devastation. In the city of Hengchun, hundreds of houses were flooded with water and one person drowned. Tremendous devastation was caused to vegetation, crops and other goods. Then, Hope passed through the Bashi Channel. While passing there, Hope took a west-northwest course and accelerated to enter the South China Sea.

At 6:06 PM on August 1, the minimum pressure dropped to about 920 millibars. Hope reached the eastern parts of Hong Kong at around 2:00 PM on August 2 and made landfall about a few miles east of Hong Kong. While it moved across the area, it slowed down to an average speed of only 20 mph (32 km/h). Hope then continued to move westward across the Pearl River estuary and swept through Guangdong. Macau survived the storm with only minor damages and minor disruption to public services. No deaths were reported.

Hope gradually weakened to a tropical storm in the midnight of August 3 while turning to move west-southwest. On August 3 that same day, Hope passed over the northern coast of the Gulf of Tonkin and dissipated about 110 nautical miles (200 kilometers) west of Hanoi.

== Impact ==
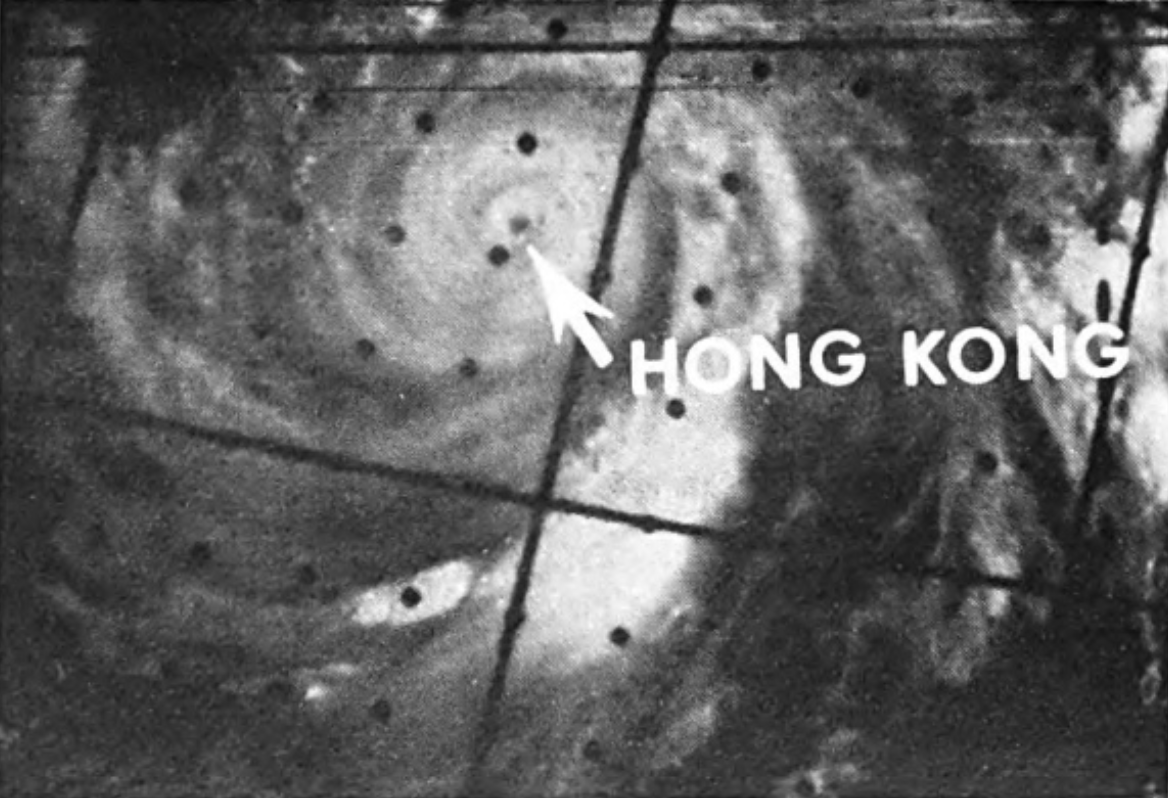
Typhoon Hope nearing landfall in southern China.

Typhoon Hope spared Taiwan, killing at least four men and disrupted many highways and railroads along the island's southeastern coast. Waves of up to 20 feet (6.1 meters) washed out 150 miles (240 kilometers) of railroad track in one incident. The typhoon caused gale-force winds and heavy rains which caused great property damage there. In the eastern part of Taiwan, 38 houses were collapsed and 132 housed were seriously damaged or completely destroyed. Farmland and fish ponds were devastated. A number of bridges were broken. In Hengchun, southern Taiwan, 500 houses were flooded and one person died. Widespread flooding was also reported in other places over southern Taiwan. Tremendous damage was caused to crops and vegetation. Two people also drowned in fishing towns in the Philippines as Hope brushed the northern part of the archipelago.

On August 2, Typhoon Hope slammed into Hong Kong bringing 145 mph (233 km/h) winds, tossing freighters about in the harbour and hurling debris through the streets of one of the world's most populated places. The storm flooded low-lying areas and killed at least one person and injured at least 18 other people. Other debris rocketed through the streets and ricocheted off buildings. Parked cars were crushed by snapped trees. A three-year-old girl died when she was swept off the deck of her family's fishing junk by a wind-whipped wave and drowned. Hope sucked windows away from buildings and flooded the interior of many homes. Flimsy shacks that served as homes from immigrants from China were completely blown away. Several freighters in the Victoria Harbour flew in the air as a result of the high winds. The high winds and giant waves also sent some ships, dragging their anchors and out of control, crashing into one another. The typhoon also triggered mudslides. The typhoon injured at least 260 people. Trees were uprooted, huge glass advertising signs were destroyed, streets flooded and sheet metal from construction sites were scattered. Public transportation, such as domestic flights, were halted. The typhoon also destroyed 200 cylinders of dangerous cyanide.

Several Vietnamese refugees who were crammed into wooden boats were feared lost. Most of the 66,000 Vietnamese refugees had already moved ashore before Typhoon Hope struck Hong Kong. 400 refugees in Macao were forced to move away from city. A few days after Typhoon Hope, public transportation resumed, and Hong Kong's international airport resumed regular flight operations. Typhoon Hope was the worst typhoon to hit Hong Kong since Typhoon Rose in 1971.

== See also ==
- Tropical Storm Dianmu (2016)
- Typhoon Wanda (1962)
- Typhoon Omar
