= Typhoon Saola (2023) =

Pacific typhoon in 2023

Typhoon Saola (Goring)
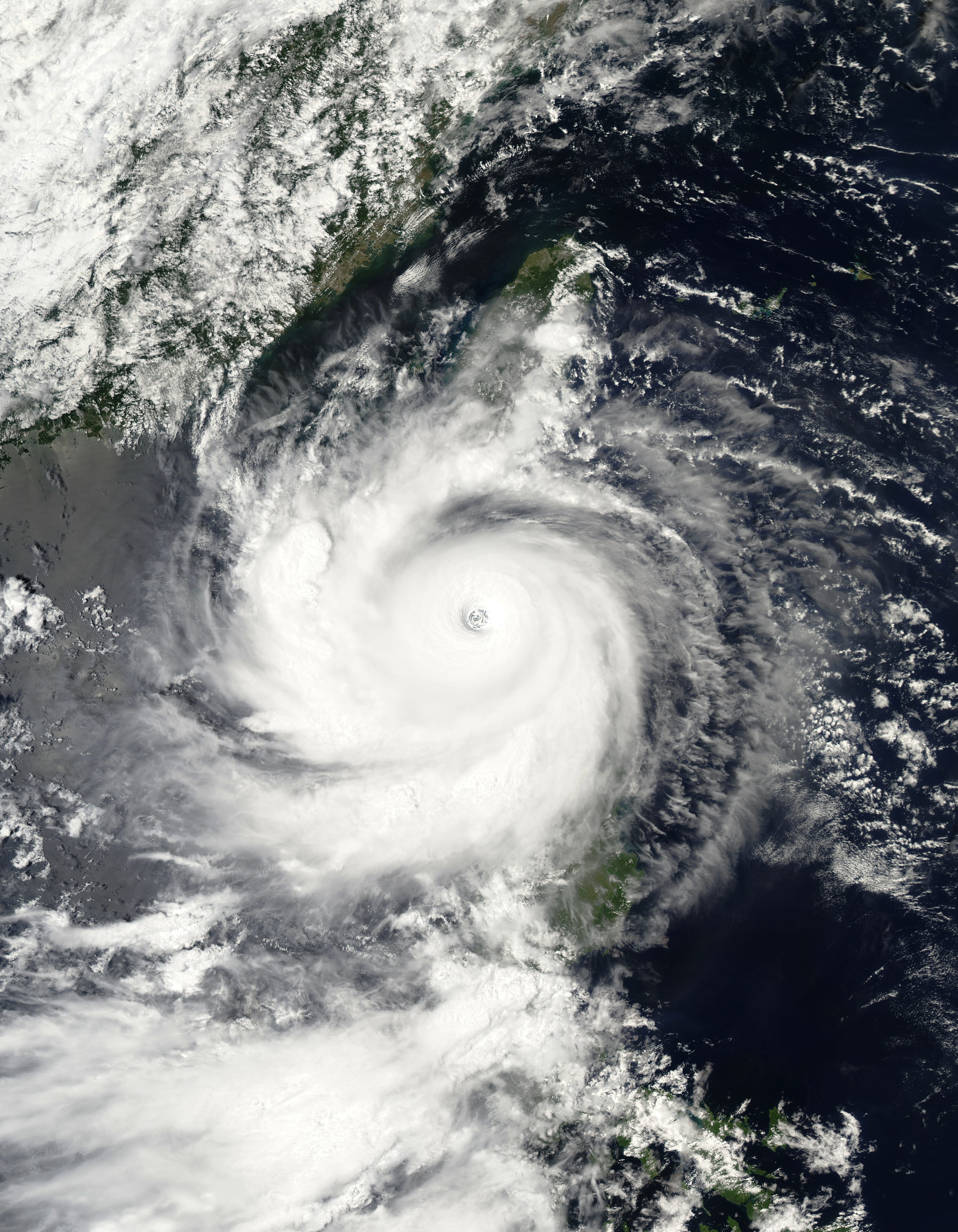
- Typhoon Saola after reaching it peak intensity north of the Babuyan Islands on August 30

Meteorological history
- Formed: August 22, 2023
- Dissipated: September 3, 2023

Violent typhoon
- 10-minute sustained (JMA)
- Highest winds: 195 km/h (120 mph)
- Lowest pressure: 920 hPa (mbar); 27.17 inHg

Category 5-equivalent super typhoon
- 1-minute sustained (SSHWS/JTWC)
- Highest winds: 260 km/h (160 mph)
- Lowest pressure: 917 hPa (mbar); 27.08 inHg

Overall effects
- Fatalities: 3
- Injuries: 87
- Missing: 1
- Damage: $1.35 billion (2023 USD)
- Areas affected: Philippines; South China; Taiwan
- IBTrACS
- Part of the 2023 Pacific typhoon season

Typhoon Saola, (Note: The name Saola (Vietnamese: sao la, [saːw˧˧ laː˧˧]) was contributed by Vietnam and refers to the saola (Pseudoryx nghetinhensis) in Vietnamese.) known in the Philippines as Super Typhoon Goring, was a powerful, erratic and destructive tropical cyclone that affected the Philippines, southern Taiwan, and South China in late August 2023. The ninth named storm, seventh typhoon, and third super typhoon (Note: A super typhoon is an unofficial category used by the Joint Typhoon Warning Center (JTWC) for a typhoon with winds of at least 240 km/h (150 mph).) of the 2023 typhoon season, Saola originated from an area of convection east of Taiwan and headed southwestwards.

The disturbance would later be named locally as Goring on August 24 as it became a tropical depression. The JTWC then followed suit designated it as Tropical Depression 09W. On the same day, the JMA upgraded it into a tropical storm, assigning the name Saola. Due to favorable conditions, Saola became a typhoon and then began a process of rapid intensification while making a looping trend. Although it did not make a direct landfall over Luzon, Saola made a close pass into Central Luzon as a Category 4-equivalent typhoon, bringing gusty winds and heavy rains over the country. It weakened back to a Category 2 typhoon on September 1 due to interaction with mountainous terrain and upwelling cold water due to slow movement despite highly favorable environmental conditions. After it executed a south-southeastward turn, Saola explosively intensified into a Category 5-equivalent super typhoon as it passed over Batanes, by the time it left the Philippine Area of Responsibility on August 31, it was still a super typhoon. Saola slightly weakened into a Category 4-equivalent super typhoon, with a clear and warm eye.

Prior to the approach of Saola, the Hong Kong Observatory (HKO) raised the highest signal category in anticipation of the storm, the first time in five years since Mangkhut in 2018. The storm continued to approach closely over Hong Kong and Macau, battering strong gusty winds and heavy rains over the area before weakening and making landfall over Southern China. Economic losses totaled to US$1.35 billion, particularly from the damages in Philippines, Hong Kong, and China.

== Meteorological history ==
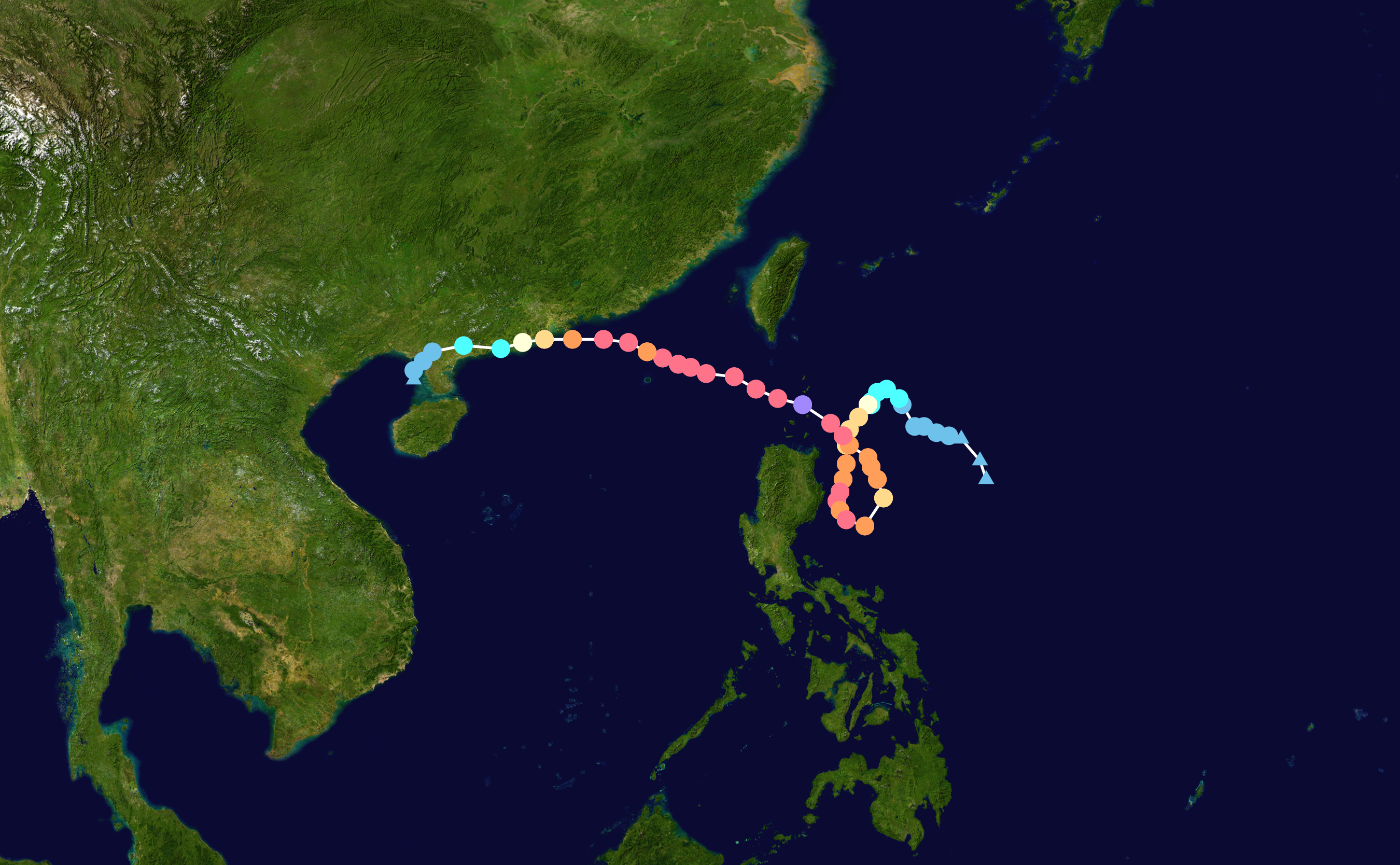
Map plotting the storm's track and intensity, according to the Saffir–Simpson scale Map key Saffir–Simpson scale Tropical depression (≤38 mph, ≤62 km/h) Tropical storm (39–73 mph, 63–118 km/h) Category 1 (74–95 mph, 119–153 km/h) Category 2 (96–110 mph, 154–177 km/h) Category 3 (111–129 mph, 178–208 km/h) Category 4 (130–156 mph, 209–251 km/h) Category 5 (≥157 mph, ≥252 km/h) Unknown Storm type Tropical cyclone Subtropical cyclone Extratropical cyclone, remnant low, tropical disturbance, or monsoon depression

On August 20, an area of convection east of Taiwan began moving southwestwards with little organization over its center. The PAGASA marked the system as a low-pressure area on August 22, and the Japan Meteorological Agency upgraded it to a tropical depression. The PAGASA initially expected the system to not develop into a tropical cyclone, but later upgraded it into a tropical depression the next day, and was given the local name of Goring, it was also given a Tropical Cyclone Formation Alert by the JTWC, designated as Tropical Depression 09W. Goring then moved generally north-northwestwards across the Philippine Sea. On August 24, Goring was upgraded to a tropical storm by the JTWC, with the JMA following suit a few hours later at 06:00 UTC, receiving the name Saola. PAGASA also followed suit in upgrading the system into a tropical storm in their 17:00 PHT (09:00 UTC) update. Saola continued to intensify and began to move southwestwards over the Philippine Sea east of the Batanes Islands. PAGASA then started to issue Tropical Cyclone Wind Signals across the eastern parts of Northern Luzon on Friday morning. A few hours later, the JTWC upgraded Saola into a typhoon, with the JMA upgrading the system to a severe tropical storm shortly thereafter. Saola was then later upgraded into a typhoon moments later by the JMA, with JTWC upgrading it to a Category 2, beginning a process of rapid intensification. PAGASA followed suit by the evening and upgraded Saola into a typhoon as well. Saola was then upgraded to a Category 4 typhoon by the morning of August 27 with an initial peak intensities of 120 kts by the JTWC, 95 kts and minimum pressure was 940 mbar by JMA.

Red visible satellite imagery loop of Typhoon Saola rapidly intensifying off the coast of Philippines on August 26, 2023. Maximum sustained winds of 195 km/h were estimated when the images were acquired.

In the early morning hours of Sunday, PAGASA then upgraded Goring (Saola) into a super typhoon after its winds passed 185 km/h (115 mph), becoming the third storm to enter in their 'super typhoon' category this year. Saola then had some fluctuations in intensity between category 3 and category 4 due to interactions with mountainous terrain and upwelling cold water due to slow movement despite highly favorable environmental conditions. Saola then executed a south-southeastward turn over the Philippine Sea, begin the eyewall replacement cycle and then weakened back into a typhoon per PAGASA, with Tropical Cyclone Wind Signal #2 and #3 being lifted as it moved away from Central Luzon. The Joint Typhoon Warning Center also downgraded Saola into Category 2 typhoon, and PAGASA dropped some tropical cyclone wind signals in Eastern Luzon. It then turned northwest, and PAGASA reissued Signal 4 for parts of the Babuyan Islands and then explosively intensified into a Category 5 super typhoon, per the Joint Typhoon Warning Center. PAGASA then followed suit and upgraded Saola (Goring) into a super typhoon once more as it was passing between the Bashi Channel, and issued Signal #5 in the northeastern portion of the Babuyan Islands, the second time this year since Typhoon Doksuri a month earlier. Later that day, Saola crossed the northwestern boundaries of the Philippine Area of Responsibility, and PAGASA issued their final tropical cyclone advisories on it, with storm signals being dropped moments later. Saola remained a powerful super typhoon as it crossed into the South China Sea southwest of Taiwan, featuring a clear and warm eye as it did so. On the afternoon of August 31 (UTC), the JTWC noted that Saola was struggling to complete an eyewall replacement cycle, resulting in some slight weakening.

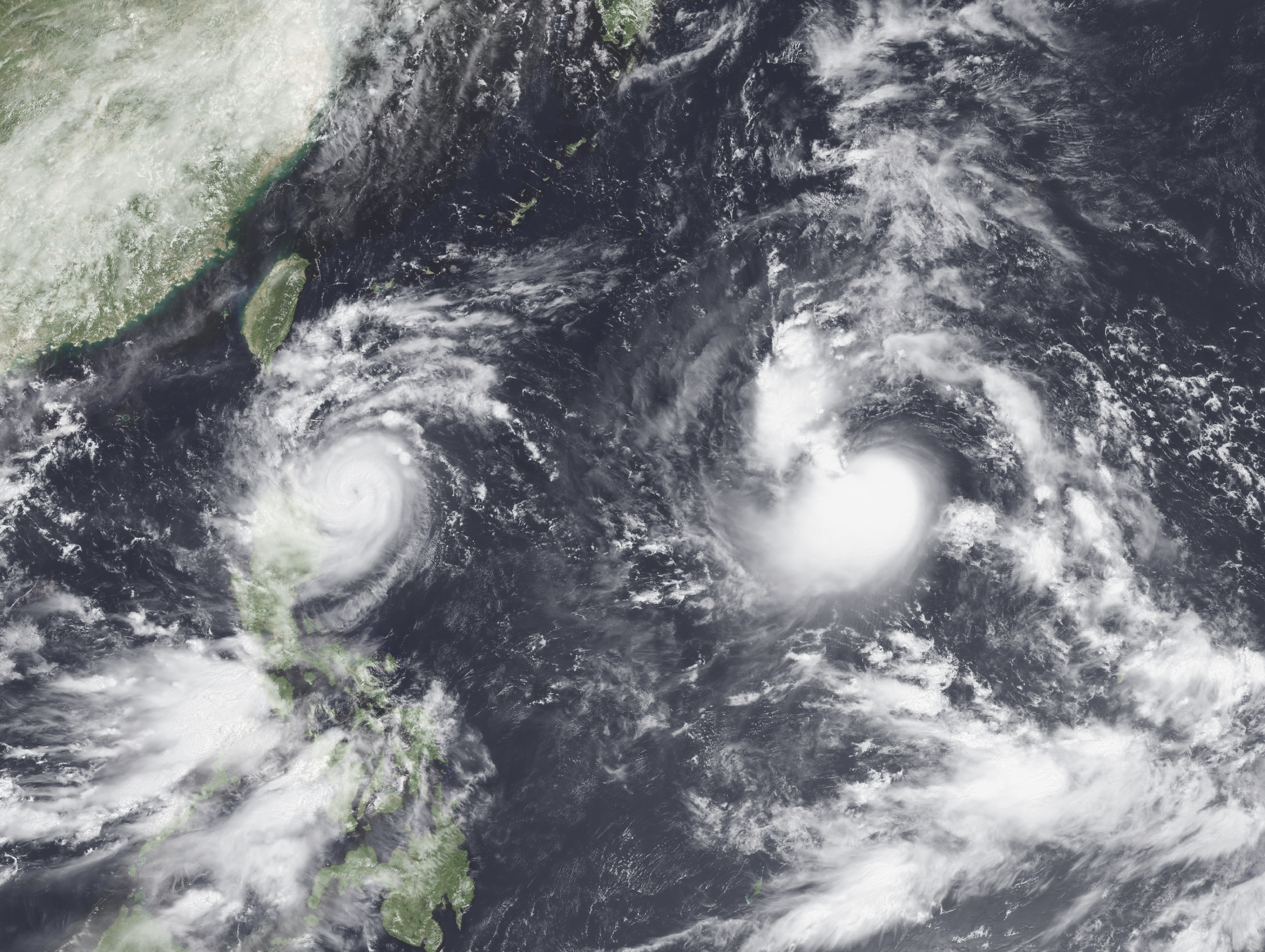
Typhoon Saola [Goring] making a loop east of Luzon (left) and Tropical Storm Haikui [Hanna] (right) developing near the Northern Mariana Islands in the Northwest Pacific Ocean

However, Saola held onto Super Typhoon Status on the JTWC scale. Meanwhile, Saola fell below the threshold for Violent Typhoon on the JMA scale that same afternoon. Around the same time, the Hong Kong Observatory had announced that tropical cyclone warning signal number 8 (Tropical Storm) would be issued at 2:40 a.m local time on Friday, with the potential of this being raised to warning signal number 10 (Hurricane) as Super Typhoon Saola drew closer. It was warned that at some locations' storm surge due to Super Typhoon Saola could reach historic levels, rivaling those of Typhoon Wanda in 1962 and Typhoon Hato in 2017. This has since been upgraded at 6:20pm to an increasing gale or storm signal number 9, and later to the Hurricane Signal number 10 at 8:15pm, becoming the first time in 5 years that the highest warning signal was raised since Typhoon Mangkhut (Ompong) back in 2018. Saola continued approaching near Southern China including Hong Kong with while maintaining Category 4 intensify. Saola then passed south of Hong Kong and Macau with as a Category 3 before it made landfall in Guangdong, China on early Saturday as a Category 2. After its landfall, Saola weakened into a strong Category 1 typhoon. The Japan Meteorological Agency then downgraded Saola into a severe tropical storm a few hours after landfall. The JTWC later followed suit and downgraded Saola into a tropical storm by their next update as it moved further inland Guangdong. As convection waned over its center, the agencies downgraded the once-powerful Saola into a tropical depression by September 2. Saola had dissipated on September 3, with its remnants causing rainfall and stormy conditions across Southern China.

== Preparations ==
=== Philippines ===
==== Highest Tropical Cyclone Wind Signal ====
Highest Tropical Cyclone Wind Signal issued by PAGASA for Saola (Goring) in each province. The white line represents the best track.

Upon Saola's (known locally as Super Typhoon Goring) designation as a tropical storm on August 24, PAGASA has issued Tropical Cyclone Wind Signal No. 1 for the northeastern part of Cagayan. After the storm reached typhoon status on the morning of August 25, the agency raised Signal No. 2 for parts of northern Luzon and Signal No. 3 in the eastern portions of Isabela as Saola made its closest approach to mainland Luzon which was then removed as Saola made a counter-clockwise loop across the Philippine Sea. Telecommunications company Globe Telecom prepared emergency supplies and personnel in areas that may be affected by the storm. Classes were suspended on August 29, the first day of the school year, in areas that had been impacted by typhoons. As a preventative measure for Saola's impacts, the Philippine Coast Guard (PCG) ordered the temporary suspension of all sea traffic for all types of vessels. About 25,000 people evacuated. After the storm reached super typhoon status on the morning of August 29, the agency raised Signal No. 5, its highest warning signal—under the risk of violent, life-threatening winds—for the Babuyan Islands for the second time this year after Super Typhoon Doksuri. Local flights were suspended early the next day as the storm wreaked havoc on Northern Luzon. Flooding in four Cagayan towns forced the evacuation of 388 individuals, and floods rose in two other towns. By August 30, most TCWS signals were lowered by the PAGASA as the storm left the Philippine Area of Responsibility.

=== China ===
The China Meteorological Administration (CMA) issued a red typhoon warning; heavy rainfall is anticipated across the provinces of Guangdong and Guangxi, as well as Hong Kong and Macau; the heaviest rainfall of 10–18 cm (3.9–7.1 in) is likely in the southwest of Guangdong Province.

=== Hong Kong ===
A T8 warning signal, landslide and rain alerts, and a special notice on floods in the northern New Territories have all been issued by the Hong Kong Observatory. This was then upgraded to Storm Signal No. 9 and later to Hurricane Signal No. 10, the highest level of tropical cyclone warning signals in Hong Kong, at 8:15 p.m, becoming the first time in 5 years that the highest warning signal has been raised since Typhoon Mangkhut back in 2018.

=== Taiwan ===
The Central Weather Bureau (CWB) issued a sea warning on August 28. As Saola continued to approach the island, the CWB issued a land warning to the southern part of Taiwan early on the next day, locally. The CWB lifted the land warning late on August 31. Some operators decided to suspended eight domestic flights and 72 ferry services. School and work were canceled in the parts of Kaohsiung and Pingtung County.

== Impact ==
=== Philippines ===
Typhoon Saola and Haikui carried expansive rain bands as it approached the Philippines, further exacerbating the southwest monsoon and causing widespread rains and floods over most of the country. Saola brought torrential rains to parts of Metro Manila. Two fatalities were confirmed in the Philippines, another went missing and three were injured. Almost 1,086,837 people were affected by Saola. At least 7,813 houses were affected, including 334 which were destroyed. Damage from the storm amounted to ₱2.49 billion (US$43.9 million).

Saola was initially expected to strike into Taiwan, but instead went into the Bashi Channel between the Babuyan Islands and Batanes, bringing strong winds and heavy rainfall across the area.

=== South China ===
On the coastal islands of Guangdong, sustained winds were recorded at 118 mph (190 km/h) at Guishan Island, and gusts were recorded at 139 mph (224 km/h) at Miaowan Island. In Guangdong Province, trees and building signs were blown off by the storm, and one person died in Shenzhen after a tree fell and hit their vehicle. Total damages were about ¥930 million (US$128.4 million).

=== Hong Kong ===
At least 86 people were injured due to storm-related effects, two landslides occurred and 1,545 trees were downed in Hong Kong. Estimated damages were about HK$3.92 billion (US$500 million).

== Retirement ==
On January 19, 2024, PAGASA announced that the name Goring was retired from the rotating naming lists due to the damages it caused throughout its onslaught despite not making landfall in the Philippines and it will never be used again as a typhoon name within the Philippine Area of Responsibility (PAR). It will be replaced with Gavino for the 2027 season.

After the season, the Typhoon Committee announced that the name Saola, along with two others, were retired from the naming lists. In the spring of 2025, the name was replaced with Saobien, a common name for echinoderms of the class Asteroidea (starfish).

== See also ==
- Weather of 2023
- Tropical cyclones in 2023
- List of Philippine typhoons (2000–present)
