= Typhoon Hato =

Pacific typhoon in 2017

Typhoon Hato (Isang)
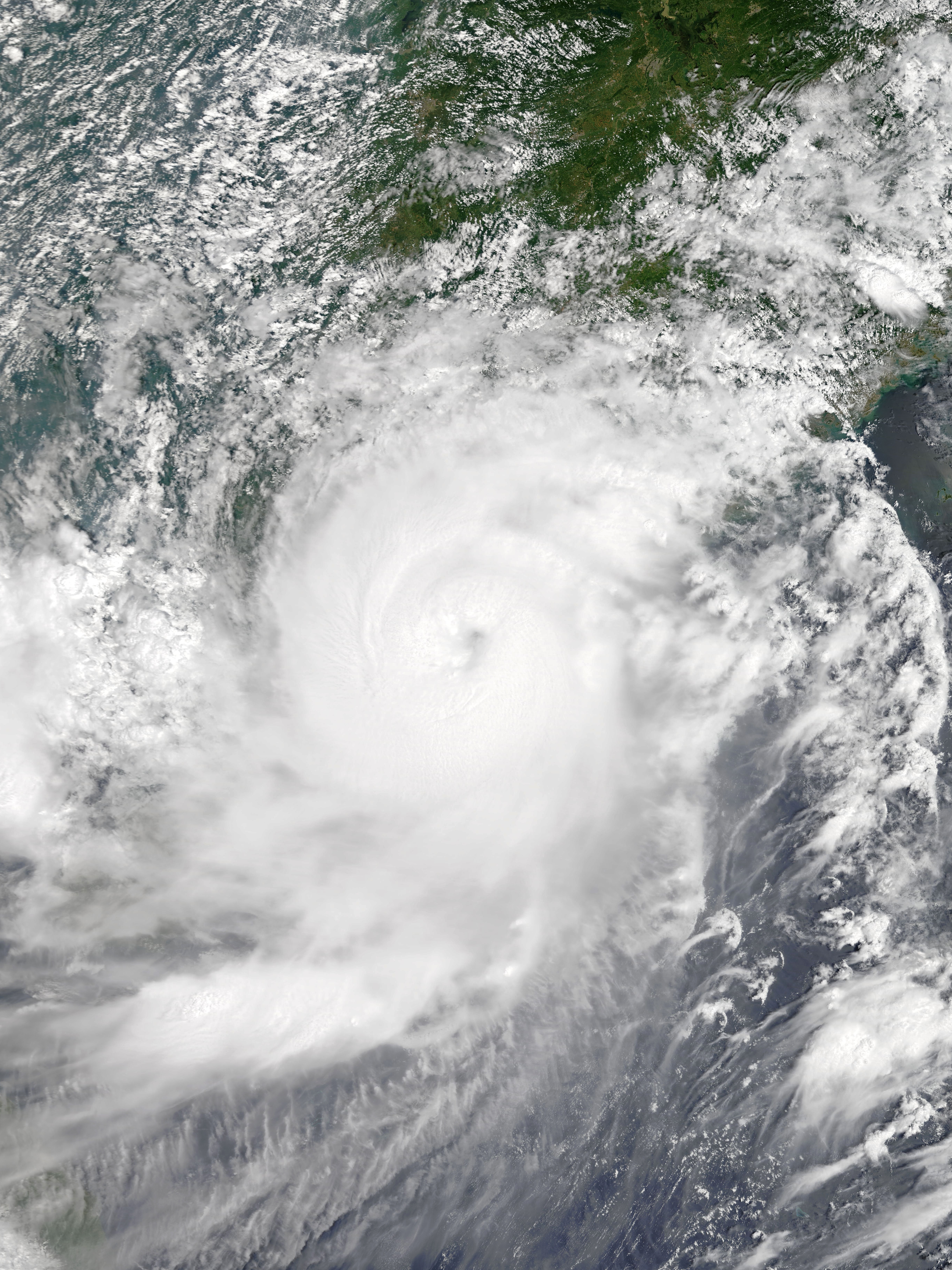
- Typhoon Hato nearing the Pearl River Delta at peak intensity on August 23

Meteorological history
- Formed: August 19, 2017
- Dissipated: August 25, 2017

Typhoon
- 10-minute sustained (JMA)
- Highest winds: 140 km/h (85 mph)
- Lowest pressure: 965 hPa (mbar); 28.50 inHg

Category 3-equivalent typhoon
- 1-minute sustained (SSHWS/JTWC)
- Highest winds: 185 km/h (115 mph)
- Lowest pressure: 948 hPa (mbar); 27.99 inHg

Overall effects
- Fatalities: 24 total
- Damage: $6.41 billion (2017 USD)
- Areas affected: Philippines; South China; Taiwan; Vietnam
- IBTrACS
- Part of the 2017 Pacific typhoon season

Typhoon Hato, (Note: The name Hato (Japanese: ハト, [ha̠to̞]) was contributed by Japan and refers to the constellation Columba, the dove, in Japanese.) known in the Philippines as Severe Tropical Storm Isang, was a powerful tropical cyclone that struck South China in late August 2017. The thirteenth named storm and fourth typhoon of the 2017 Pacific typhoon season, Hato developed as a tropical depression east of Luzon on August 19. It strengthened into a tropical storm the next day and emerged over the northern South China Sea on August 21, where it reached typhoon intensity. Undergoing rapid intensification on August 23, Hato became a Category 3-equivalent typhoon before making landfall in Jinwan, Zhuhai. The storm quickly weakened over land and dissipated on August 24.

One of the strongest typhoons to affect Macau and Hong Kong in the past 50 years, Hato caused extensive damage totaling US$6.82 billion along its path. Most of the destruction occurred in mainland China, where the storm produced a powerful storm surge that triggered severe flooding across several provinces along the Pearl River and generated wind gusts up to 240 km/h (150 mph). Both Hong Kong and Macau raised their highest tropical cyclone signals in anticipation of Hato, which caused more than US$1 billion in damage in each territory. While weakening, the storm also brought heavy rain and a tornado to Vietnam. In total, 24 fatalities were reported.

Hato made landfall along the southern coast of Zhuhai with Category 3-equivalent intensity, featuring both one- and two-minute sustained winds of 185 km/h (115 mph), which is strong, though not as powerful as other major typhoons. Three previous typhoons, Wanda (1962), Ruby (1964), and Vicente (2012), followed similar east-southeast to west-northwest tracks, making landfall on slightly different parts of the coast. Hato's forward speed was the fastest among them, reaching 32.5 km/h (20.2 mph), nearly twice that of Wanda.

== Meteorological history ==
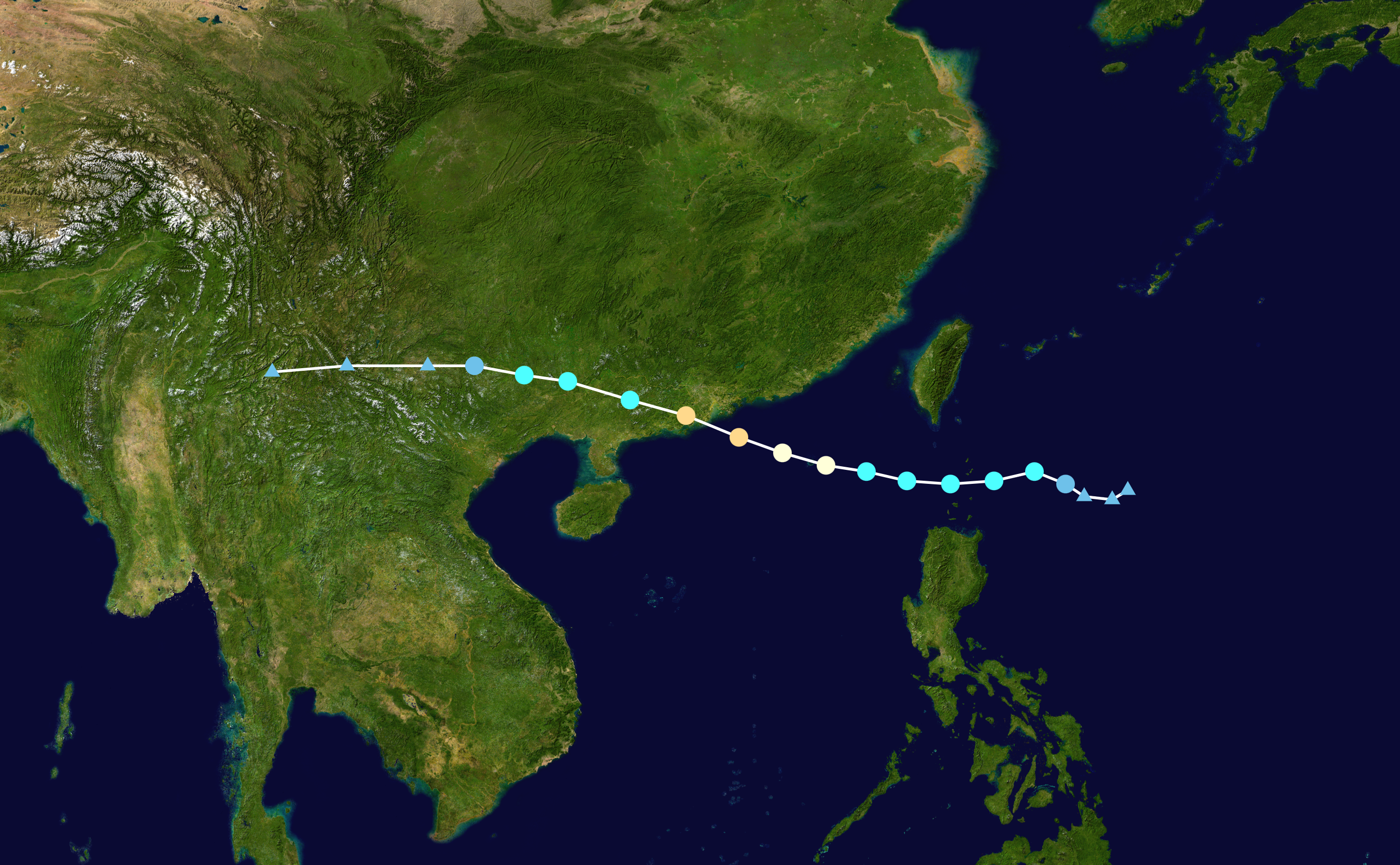
Map plotting the storm's track and intensity, according to the Saffir–Simpson scale (Note: The position of Hato's Category 3 peak is not depicted in this graphic as it is an asynoptic point (i.e. not at the 3-hour intervals of all other points) occurring at 11:00 UTC 23 August.) Map key Saffir–Simpson scale Tropical depression (≤38 mph, ≤62 km/h) Tropical storm (39–73 mph, 63–118 km/h) Category 1 (74–95 mph, 119–153 km/h) Category 2 (96–110 mph, 154–177 km/h) Category 3 (111–129 mph, 178–208 km/h) Category 4 (130–156 mph, 209–251 km/h) Category 5 (≥157 mph, ≥252 km/h) Unknown Storm type Tropical cyclone Subtropical cyclone Extratropical cyclone, remnant low, tropical disturbance, or monsoon depression

During the late hours of August 18, the Joint Typhoon Warning Center (JTWC) began monitoring a tropical disturbance that had developed about 1,495 km (929 mi) southeast of Taipei, Taiwan. By August 19, the Japan Meteorological Agency (JMA) classified the area of low pressure as a tropical depression. Around the same time, the JTWC issued a Tropical Cyclone Formation Alert (TCFA), while the JMA began issuing advisories, reporting that the system had 10-minute sustained winds of 55 km/h (35 mph). By 03:00 UTC on August 20, the JTWC began issuing warnings, classifying the system as a tropical depression and designating it as 15W. The Philippine Atmospheric, Geophysical and Astronomical Services Administration (PAGASA) eventually named the system Isang as it entered the Philippine Area of Responsibility. Six hours later, the JMA upgraded it to a tropical storm and assigned the international name Hato.

At 15:00 UTC on August 20, the Joint Typhoon Warning Center (JTWC) upgraded Hato to a tropical storm after the system became better organized. By this time, Hato was located in a favorable environment with low vertical wind shear and sea surface temperatures of about 30 °C (86 °F). The storm failed to intensify through most of August 21 as its low-level circulation center (LLCC) remained partly exposed and the convection appeared sheared. Several hours later, the LLCC broadened as convection redeveloped near the center. By August 22, the sea surface temperature around Hato had warmed to about 31 °C (88 °F), prompting the Japan Meteorological Agency (JMA) to upgrade the system to a severe tropical storm. The storm rapidly consolidated, forming a well-defined 20-nautical-mile-wide (37 km; 23 mi) eye and developing a much-improved convective structure with tightly curved banding feeding into the LLCC. Both the JMA and JTWC upgraded Hato to a typhoon six hours later, although the system’s eye soon became less organized.

Early on August 23, the JTWC upgraded Hato to a Category 2 typhoon as its eye reformed beneath a growing central dense overcast. Hato reached its peak intensity as a Category 3-equivalent typhoon, with Dvorak estimates peaking at T5.5. The JMA assessed maximum 10-minute sustained winds of 150 km/h (95 mph) and a minimum pressure of 960 hPa (28.35 inHg), later revised in post-analysis to 140 km/h (85 mph) and 965 hPa (28.50 inHg). However, a minimum pressure of 945 hPa (27.91 inHg) was recorded in Macau, while the China Meteorological Administration (CMA) reported 935 hPa (27.61 inHg), suggesting a higher intensity. Hato made landfall along the southern coast of Zhuhai, Guangdong at 12:50 CST (04:50 UTC). About three hours later, the JTWC issued its final advisory as Hato moved inland. The JMA downgraded Hato to a severe tropical storm six hours later, and then to a tropical storm. The agency continued tracking Hato until 06:00 UTC on August 24.

== Impact ==
Deaths and damage from Typhoon Hato
Country/region	Casualties		Damage (2017 USD)	Ref
Country/region	Deaths	Injured	Damage (2017 USD)	
Hong Kong	0	121	$511 million	
Macau	10	244	$1.56 billion	
Mainland China	11	523	$4.34 billion	
Vietnam	1	1	$1.36 million	
Totals:	24	845	$6.41 billion	

=== Hong Kong ===
For the first time in five years, since Typhoon Vicente in 2012, the Hong Kong Observatory issued Hurricane Signal No. 10, the highest level in the tropical cyclone warning system. The HKO recorded a record-high temperature of 36.6 °C (97.9 °F) during the typhoon. The Air Quality Health Index also reached level 8 at several monitoring stations. In response, businesses, government offices, schools, courts, and the stock market were closed. At least 121 injuries were reported as the storm swept through the city. Widespread property damage occurred, including shattered windows, collapsed scaffolding, and more than 690 reports of fallen trees, debris, and broken glass scattered across streets and major roads. Severe flooding was reported in low-lying areas such as Heng Fa Chuen, Lei Yue Mun, and Tai O due to storm surge. More than 450 flights were canceled or delayed at Hong Kong International Airport, and public transport was brought to a standstill. The estimated economic loss was around HK$4 billion (US$511 million).

=== Macau ===
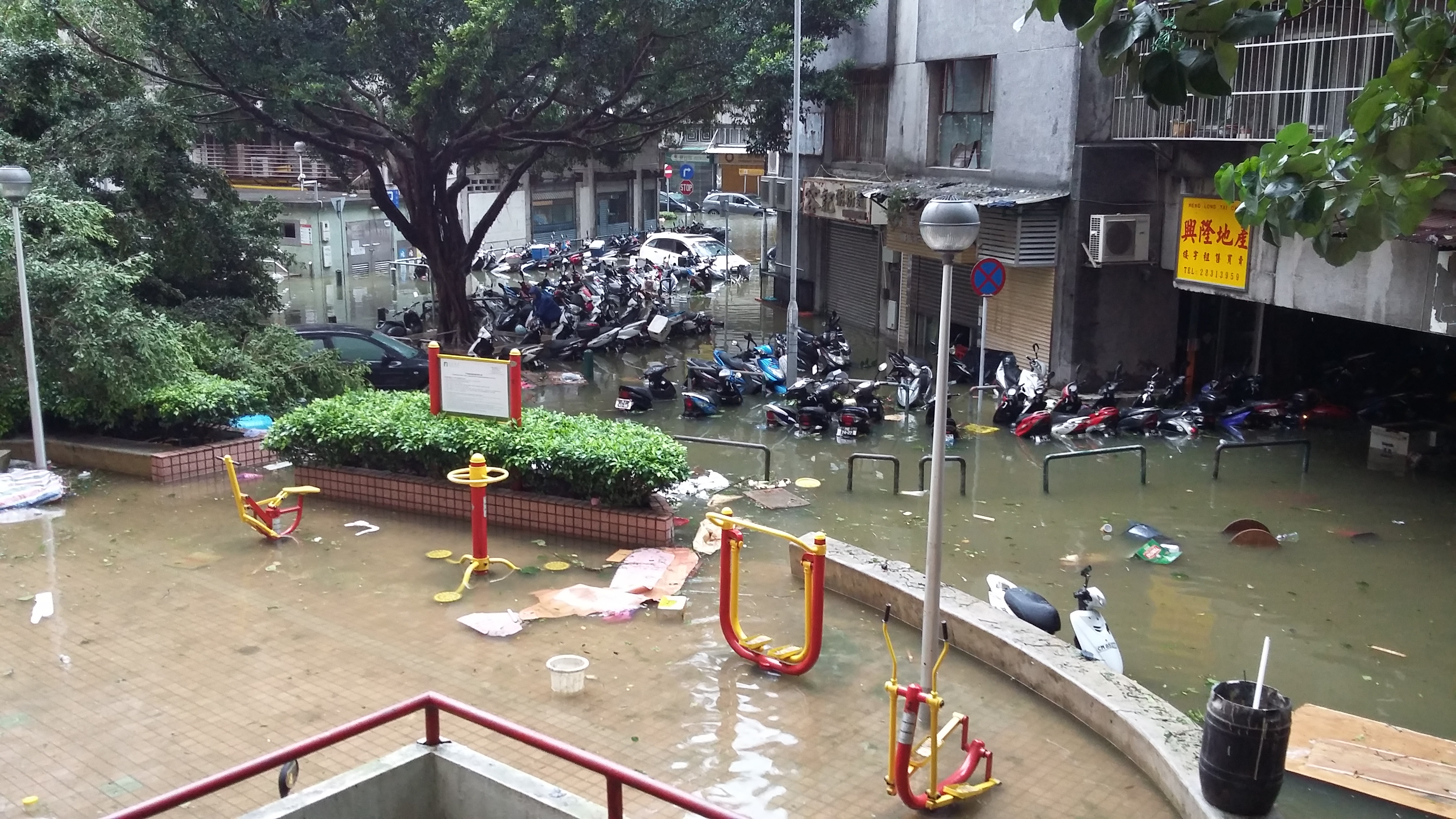
Street flooding in Macau

The storm was the strongest to have hit Macau in 53 years, according to Macau's Chief Executive Fernando Chui, and it was the first time in 18 years that the Macao Meteorological and Geophysical Bureau hoisted a No. 10 tropical cyclone signal. Maximum hourly mean winds of 132 km/h (82 mph) and gusts of 217 km/h (135 mph) were the highest on record in Macau. Most areas of the territory was hit by major flooding and property damages, with citywide power and water outage lasting for at least 24 hours after the passage of the storm. Overall, 10 deaths and at least 200 injuries were reported. The head of the Macao Meteorological and Geophysical Bureau resigned due to criticisms by the Macanese public that officials failed to predict the ferocity of the storm. The Corruption Agency is investigating The Meteorology Bureau's forecasting procedures and management, including the former director Fong Soi-Kun. The Macau SAR Government also announced 1.3 billion Macanese patacas would be set aside for those affected by the typhoon, with families of victims to get up to 300,000 patacas (US$37 thousand) each. In total, Macau suffered an economic loss of 12.55 billion patacas (US$1.56 billion).

There were shortages of basic supplies locally due to residents buying up remaining stocks in response to the utilities shortages and flooding. At the request of the local government, the Chinese People's Liberation Army Macau Garrison was deployed to assist in disaster relief and cleaning up for the first time in Macau history. About 1,000 troops were called in to help remove debris and clear roads. Macau police arrested two people for using phones to spread unverified information alleging that the authorities had sought to cover up the discovery of bodies in a car park during Typhoon Hato.

A typhoon and storm surge coupling model demonstrated that the maximum storm surge height reached nearly 2.5 m (8.2 ft) along the coast of Macau, while that in Hong Kong was slightly below 2 m (6.6 ft). Furthermore, a field survey of urban flooding revealed evidence of a 2.25-m inundation in downtown Macau and a 0.55-m inundation on Lantau Island, Hong Kong, which were likely exacerbated by a combination of storm surge, heavy rainfall, and surface water runoff over a complex hilly terrain.

=== China ===
Hato making landfall over Jinwan, Zhuhai on August 23

A storm surge ranging from 500 to 1,300 mm (20 to 51 in) along the Pearl River inundated parts of Guangdong, Guangxi, Yunnan, Fujian, and Guizhou provinces. Peak winds of 66.9 m/s (241 km/h) were recorded in Guishan Island, Zhuhai, the strongest winds ever observed in the city. A total of 267 people were injured, including 10 who sustained serious injuries. Another 256 residents were stranded and required rescue operations. Overall, 32 people were killed, and total economic losses across mainland China reached CN¥28.91 billion (US$4.34 billion).

=== Vietnam ===
Despite passing well to the north of Vietnam, the storm triggered heavy rainfall and a tornado in Lào Cai, Vietnam on August 23. More than 754 houses were damaged in Sa Pa, which injured one person. Strong winds damaged about 40 ha (99 acres) of rice crops which included 37 ha (91 acres) of corn. The storm injured one person and total damage reached 7 billion₫ (US$308 thousand). Total damage in Vietnam from the remnants of Hato reached 30 billion₫ (US$1.20 million).

== Retirement ==
Due to the extensive damage and high death toll in South China, the name Hato was officially retired during the 50th annual session of the ESCAP/WMO Typhoon Committee in February 2018. In February 2019, the Typhoon Committee subsequently chose Yamaneko as its replacement name.

== See also ==
- Weather of 2017
- Tropical cyclones in 2017
- Other tropical cyclones named Isang
