= List of storms named Nanmadol =

The name Nanmadol (Pohnpeian: Nan Madol, [nɐn mɐtol]) has been used for four tropical cyclones in the western North Pacific Ocean. The name was contributed by the Federated States of Micronesia and refers to Nan Madol, an archaeological site on Pohnpei.

- Typhoon Nanmadol (2004) (T0427, 30W, Yoyong) – a Category 4 Super Typhoon that struck the Philippines and Taiwan.
- Typhoon Nanmadol (2011) (T1111, 14W, Mina) – a Category 5 Super Typhoon that struck the Philippines, Taiwan and China.
- Severe Tropical Storm Nanmadol (2017) (T1703, 05W, Emong) – struck Japan and caused moderate damage.
- Typhoon Nanmadol (2022) (T2214, 16W, Josie) – Category 4 super typhoon that brushed Japan.

Preceded by Merbok	Pacific typhoon season names Nanmadol	Succeeded by Talas
