= List of retired Philippine typhoon names =

This is a cumulative list of typhoon names that were previously used to name storms that enter or develop within the Philippine Area of Responsibility (PAR), but later removed from use.

Since 1963, the Philippine Atmospheric, Geophysical and Astronomical Services Administration (PAGASA) has assigned local names to a tropical cyclone that enters or forms within their area of responsibility, located between 135°E and 115°E and between 5°N-25°N, even if the cyclone already has an international name assigned to it.

Currently, PAGASA use four alphabetic sets of twenty-five names that rotate each year. However, in the case of a particularly damaging or deadly storm, that specific name is removed and replaced with another name. PAGASA removes a name from the list if the storm it is attributed to caused at least ₱1 billion (~US$20 million) in damage or 300 deaths within the Philippines.

Within this list, all information with regard to intensity is taken from while the system was in the Philippine Area of Responsibility, and is thus taken from the PAGASA's archives, rather than the Joint Typhoon Warning Center (JTWC) or Japan Meteorological Agency (JMA)'s archives.

== Background ==
The Philippine Area of Responsibility (PAR) for tropical cyclone warnings

The practice of using names to identify tropical cyclones goes back several centuries, with tropical cyclones being named after affected places, saints or things they hit before the formal start of naming in the Western Pacific. These included the Kamikaze, 1906 Hong Kong typhoon, 1922 Swatow typhoon and the 1934 Muroto typhoon.

Since 1963, the Philippine Atmospheric, Geophysical and Astronomical Services Administration (PAGASA) has assigned local names to a tropical cyclone should it move into or form as a tropical depression in their area of responsibility located between 135°E and 115°E and between 5°N-25°N, even if the cyclone has had an international name assigned to it. All three agencies that have assigned names to tropical cyclones within the Western Pacific have retired the names of significant tropical cyclones, with the PAGASA retiring names if a cyclone has caused at least ₱1 billion (~US$20 million) in damage and/or have caused at least 300 deaths within the Philippines.

The naming lists have been revised in 1979, 1985, 2001 (after a contest called the "Name a Bagyo Contest", conducted by the PAGASA in 1998, where 140 entries were submitted in 1998 to revise the naming system for typhoons within their area of responsibility starting that season), 2005 (for various reasons, including to help minimize confusion in the historical records and to remove the names that might have negative associations with real persons), and 2021 (where the "Reserved List" was introduced).

In November 1999, PAGASA announced its intention to retire its old typhoon naming scheme because the names were sometimes perceived as odd, outdated and sexist. As a result, it launched the “Name a Bagyo Contest,” which was designed to find 210 names that PAGASA could assign to tropical cyclones in its self-defined area of responsibility. Submitted names had to be easily pronounced and could not start with the letters Ñ, NG, or X. Additionally, names could not exceed nine letters or three syllables, nor could they have meanings that were negative or offensive.

PAGASA retires a name it has assigned after the season if the system has either killed at least 300 people or caused at least PHP1 billion in damage to infrastructure and agriculture, based on reports from the Office of the Civil Defense.

Several names have also been removed for reasons other than causing a significant amount of death/destruction, such as Gloria in 2005, (due to then-president Gloria Macapagal Arroyo's disputed win in the 2004 Philippine presidential election and her subsequent involvement in the Hello Garci scandal) and Nonoy in 2015 (due to similarities to the term "Noynoy", then-president Benigno Aquino III's nickname).

As of 2026, 92 tropical cyclone names have been retired, with the most recent being Crising, Emong, Mirasol, Nando, Opong, Tino, and Uwan from the 2025 season.

== Retired names ==
=== Names retired before 2000 ===
| Name | Replacement | Dates active | Category | Sustained wind speeds | Pressure | Provinces affected | Damage (PHP) | Deaths | Missing | Refs |
|---|---|---|---|---|---|---|---|---|---|---|
| Dading (Winnie) | Didang | 26 June – 3 July 1964 | Typhoon | Not specified | Not specified | Luzon | ₱31 million | 56 | None | |
| Welming (Emma) | Warling | 31 October – 8 November 1967 | Typhoon | Not specified | Not specified | Visayas, Luzon | ₱97 million | 107 | None | |
| Pitang (Georgia) | Pasing | 8 – 12 September 1970 | Typhoon | Not specified | Not specified | Luzon | ₱4 million | 175 | 80 | |
| Sening (Joan) | Susang | 11 – 15 October 1970 | Typhoon | Not specified | Not specified | Luzon, Visayas | ₱790 million | 575 | 193 | |
| Titang (Kate) | Tering | 16 – 22 October 1970 | Typhoon | Not specified | Not specified | Mindanao, Visayas | ₱305 million | 631 | 284 | |
| Yoling (Patsy) | Yaning | 17 – 20 November 1970 | Typhoon | Not specified | Not specified | Luzon | ₱810 million | 80 | 17 | |
| Wening (Elaine) | Weling | 23 October – 1 November 1974 | Typhoon | Not specified | Not specified | Luzon | ₱117 million | 23 | None | |
| Didang (Olga) | Ditang | 12 – 26 May 1976 | Typhoon | Not specified | Not specified | Luzon | ₱624 million | 200 | 147 | |
| Unding (Kim) | Unsing | 6 – 17 November 1977 | Typhoon | Not specified | Not specified | Luzon | ₱301 million | 40 | None | |
| Atang (Olive) | Akang | 15 – 26 April 1978 | Typhoon | Not specified | Not specified | Visayas, Luzon | ₱246 million | 66 | 45 | |
| Kading (Rita) | Katring | 15 – 29 October 1978 | Typhoon | Not specified | Not specified | Luzon | ₱1.02 billion | 444 | 280 | |
| Nitang (Ike) | Ningning | 26 August – 6 September 1984 | Typhoon | Not specified | Not specified | Visayas, Luzon | ₱3.91 billion | 900 | 443 | |
| Undang (Agnes) | Unsang | 3 – 6 November 1984 | Typhoon | Not specified | Not specified | Visayas, Luzon | ₱1.54 billion | 895 | 272 | |
| Katring (Thelma) | Karing | 18 – 21 October 1987 | Super Typhoon | Not specified | Not specified | Luzon | | | | |
| Herming (Betty) | Helming | 8 – 14 August 1987 | Typhoon | Not specified | Not specified | Luzon, Visayas | ₱2.07 billion | 85 | 9 | |
| Sisang (Nina) | Sendang | 16 – 30 November 1987 | Typhoon | Not specified | Not specified | Luzon | ₱1.12 billion | 808 | 171 | |
| Unsang (Ruby) | Ulpiang | 21 – 26 October 1988 | Typhoon | Not specified | Not specified | Luzon | ₱5.64 billion | 157 | 60 | |
| Yoning (Skip) | Yerling | 3 – 12 November 1988 | Typhoon | Not specified | Not specified | Visayas, Luzon | ₱2.77 billion | 217 | 133 | |
| Ruping (Mike) | Ritang | 5 – 18 November 1990 | Super Typhoon | Not specified | Not specified | Visayas | ₱10.8 billion | 508 | 246 | |
| Uring (Thelma) | Ulding | 1 – 8 November 1991 | Tropical storm | Not specified | Not specified | Visayas | ₱1.05 billion | 5,101 | 1,256 | |
| Monang (Lola) | Miling | 1 – 9 December 1993 | Typhoon | Not specified | Not specified | Visayas | | | | |
| Rosing (Angela) | Rening | 25 October – 7 November 1995 | Super Typhoon | 240 km/h (150 mph) | 910 hPa (26.87 inHg) | Luzon | ₱10.8 billion | 936 | 316 | |
| Iliang (Zeb) | Not Replaced | 11 – 14 October 1998 | Super Typhoon | 240 km/h (150 mph) | 900 hPa (26.58 inHg) | Southern Luzon | ₱5.38 billion | 46 | 29 | |
| Loleng (Babs) | Not Replaced | 15 – 24 October 1998 | Super Typhoon | 190 km/h (115 mph) | 940 hPa (27.76 inHg) | Visayas, Luzon | ₱6.79 billion | 303 | 29 | |
| 24 names | (Note: Reference for the retired names and the names that replaced them between 1963 and 2000.) | | | | | | | | | |

=== Names retired in the 2000s ===
| Name | Replacement | Dates active | Category | Sustained wind speeds | Pressure | Provinces affected | Damage (PHP) | Deaths | Missing | Refs |
|---|---|---|---|---|---|---|---|---|---|---|
| Nanang (Lingling) | Nando | 6 – 10 November 2001 | Typhoon | 120 km/h (75 mph) | Not Specified | Luzon | ₱3.25 billion | 236 | 88 | |
| Harurot (Imbudo) | Hanna | 19 – 23 July 2003 | Super Typhoon | 185 km/h (115 mph) | 941 hPa (27.79 inHg) | Luzon | ₱4.73 billion | 64 | 2 | |
| Unding (Muifa) | Ulysses | 14 – 21 November 2004 | Typhoon | 120 km/h (75 mph) | 976 hPa (28.82 inHg) | Luzon | ₱1.01 billion | 68 | 69 | |
| Violeta (Merbok) | Vicky | 22 – 23 November 2004 | Tropical Depression | 55 km/h (35 mph) | 1000 hPa (29.53 inHg) | Luzon | ₱2.1 billion | 29 | 17 | |
| Winnie | Warren (unused) | 27 – 30 November 2004 | Tropical Depression | 55 km/h (35 mph) | 1000 hPa (29.53 inHg) | Luzon | ₱679 million | 1,593 | 751 | |
| Milenyo (Xangsane) | Mario | 25 – 29 September 2006 | Typhoon | 140 km/h (85 mph) | 967 hPa (28.56 inHg) | Luzon, Visayas | ₱6.61 billion | 110 | 79 | |
| Reming (Durian) | Ruby | 28 November – 2 December 2006 | Super Typhoon | 195 km/h (120 mph) | 938 hPa (27.70 inHg) | Luzon, Visayas | ₱3.48 billion | 734 | 762 | |
| Cosme (Halong) | Carina | 14 – 19 May 2008 | Severe Tropical Storm | 105 km/h (65 mph) | 982 hPa (29.00 inHg) | Luzon | ₱4.71 billion | 61 | 3 | |
| Frank (Fengshen) | Ferdie | 18 – 23 June 2008 | Typhoon | 160 km/h (100 mph) | 958 hPa (28.29 inHg) | Luzon, Visayas | ₱13.5 billion | 557 | 87 | |
| Feria (Nangka) | Fabian | 23 – 27 June 2009 | Tropical Storm | 75 km/h (45 mph) | 996 hPa (29.41 inHg) | Luzon | ₱205 million | 12 | 4 | |
| Ondoy (Ketsana) | Odette | 24 – 27 September 2009 | Severe Tropical Storm | 110 km/h (70 mph) | 980 hPa (28.94 inHg) | Luzon | ₱11 billion | 464 | 37 | |
| Pepeng (Parma) | Paolo | 30 September – 10 October 2009 | Super Typhoon | 195 km/h (120 mph) | 938 hPa (27.70 inHg) | Visayas, Luzon | ₱27.3 billion | 465 | 47 | |
| 12 names | References for names retired: (Note: Reference for the retired names and the names that replaced them between 2001 and 2020.) | | | | | | ₱81.8 billion | 3,575 | 1,904 | |

=== Names retired in the 2010s ===
| Name | Replacement | Dates active | Category | Sustained wind speeds | Pressure | Provinces affected | Damage (PHP) | Deaths | Missing | Refs |
|---|---|---|---|---|---|---|---|---|---|---|
| Juan (Megi) | Jose | 15 – 20 October 2010 | Super Typhoon | 225 km/h (140 mph) | 922 hPa (27.23 inHg) | Luzon | ₱12 billion | 31 | 4 | |
| Katring (Chaba) | Karding (Note: The name Kanor was meant to replace Katring, but was changed to Karding due to negative feedback from the public, and the involvement of a sexist personality named Mang Kanor.) | 23 – 26 October 2010 | Typhoon | 150 km/h (95 mph) | 963 hPa (28.44 inHg) | None | None | None | None | |
| Bebeng (Aere) | Betty | 6 – 10 May 2011 | Tropical Storm | 85 km/h (55 mph) | 991 hPa (29.26 inHg) | Luzon, Visayas | ₱2.25 billion | 35 | 2 | |
| Juaning (Nock-ten) | Jenny | 24 – 28 July 2011 | Severe Tropical Storm | 95 km/h (60 mph) | 987 hPa (29.15 inHg) | Visayas, Luzon | ₱4.44 billion | 77 | 9 | |
| Mina (Nanmadol) | Marilyn | 21 – 29 August 2011 | Super Typhoon | 195 km/h (120 mph) | 938 hPa (27.70 inHg) | Luzon | ₱2.09 billion | 36 | 8 | |
| Pedring (Nesat) | Perla | 24 – 28 September 2011 | Typhoon | 140 km/h (85 mph) | 967 hPa (28.56 inHg) | Luzon | ₱14.6 billion | 85 | None | |
| Sendong (Washi) | Sarah | 14 – 18 December 2011 | Tropical Storm | 75 km/h (45 mph) | 994 hPa (29.35 inHg) | Visayas, Mindanao | ₱2.07 billion | 1,268 | 181 | |
| Pablo (Bopha) | Pepito | 2 – 9 December 2012 | Super Typhoon | 185 km/h (115 mph) | 943 hPa (27.85 inHg) | Mindanao, Visayas, Luzon | ₱36.9 billion | 1,067 | 834 | |
| Labuyo (Utor) | Lannie | 9 – 12 August 2013 | Super Typhoon | 175 km/h (110 mph) | 948 hPa (27.99 inHg) | Luzon | ₱1.58 billion | 11 | 2 | |
| Santi (Nari) | Salome | 8 – 13 October 2013 | Typhoon | 150 km/h (95 mph) | 963 hPa (28.44 inHg) | Luzon | ₱3.33 billion | 15 | 5 | |
| Yolanda (Haiyan) | Yasmin (unused) | 6 – 9 November 2013 | Super Typhoon | 235 km/h (145 mph) | 914 hPa (26.99 inHg) | Visayas, Mindanao, Palawan | ₱95.5 billion | 6,300 | 1,061 | |
| Glenda (Rammasun) | Gardo | 13 – 17 July 2014 | Typhoon | 150 km/h (95 mph) | 963 hPa (28.44 inHg) | Luzon | ₱38.6 billion | 106 | 5 | |
| Jose (Halong) | Josie | 2 – 7 August 2014 | Super Typhoon | 150 km/h (95 mph) | 920 hPa (27.17 inHg) | Luzon | ₱1.6 billion | 2 | None | |
| Mario (Fung-wong) | Maymay | 17 – 21 September 2014 | Tropical Storm | 85 km/h (50 mph) | 985 hPa (29.09 inHg) | Luzon | ₱3.75 billion | 18 | 4 | |
| Ruby (Hagupit) | Rosita | 3 – 10 December 2014 | Super Typhoon | 215 km/h (130 mph) | 905 hPa (26.72 inHg) | Visayas, Luzon | ₱5.09 billion | 24 | None | |
| Seniang (Jangmi) | Samuel | 28 – 31, December 2014 | Tropical Storm | 75 km/h (45 mph) | 996 hPa (29.41 inHg) | Visayas, Mindanao | ₱1.27 billion | 66 | 6 | |
| Lando (Koppu) | Liwayway | 14 – 21 October 2015 | Super Typhoon | 185 km/h (115 mph) | 920 hPa (27.17 inHg) | Luzon | ₱14.4 billion | 58 | 4 | |
| Nona (Melor) | Nimfa | 9 – 17 December 2015 | Typhoon | 175 km/h (110 mph) | 935 hPa (27.61 inHg) | Luzon, Visayas | ₱7.04 billion | 51 | 4 | |
| Karen (Sarika) | Kristine | 11 – 16 October 2016 | Typhoon | 175 km/h (110 mph) | 935 hPa (27.61 inHg) | Luzon | ₱3.66 billion | None | None | |
| Lawin (Haima) | Leon | 16 – 21 October 2016 | Super Typhoon | 215 km/h (130 mph) | 900 hPa (26.58 inHg) | Luzon | ₱3.74 billion | 14 | None | |
| Nina (Nock-ten) | Nika | 22 – 28 December 2016 | Super Typhoon | 195 km/h (120 mph) | 915 hPa (27.02 inHg) | Luzon | ₱5.92 billion | 13 | 21 | |
| Urduja (Kai-tak) | Uwan | 11 – 19 December 2017 | Tropical storm | 80 km/h (50 mph) | 993 hPa (29.32 inHg) | Visayas | ₱3.94 billion | 47 | 44 | |
| Vinta (Tembin) | Verbena | 20 – 24 December 2017 | Typhoon | 120 km/h (75 mph) | 973 hPa (28.73 inHg) | Visayas, Mindanao | ₱2.1 billion | 173 | 169 | |
| Ompong (Mangkhut) | Obet | 12 – 15 September 2018 | Super Typhoon | 205 km/h (125 mph) | 905 hPa (26.72 inHg) | Luzon | ₱33.9 billion | 82 | 2 | |
| Rosita (Yutu) | Rosal | 27 – 31 October 2018 | Super Typhoon | 215 km/h (130 mph) | 900 hPa (26.58 inHg) | Luzon | ₱2.9 billion | 20 | None | |
| Usman | Umberto (unused) | 25 – 30 December 2018 | Tropical depression | 55 km/h (35 mph) | 998 hPa (29.47 inHg) | Visayas, Luzon | ₱5.41 billion | 158 | 26 | |
| Tisoy (Kammuri) | Tamaraw (unused) | 30 November – 4 December 2019 | Typhoon | 175 km/h (110 mph) | 945 hPa (27.91 inHg) | Luzon, Visayas | ₱6.65 billion | 17 | None | |
| Ursula (Phanfone) | Ugong (unused) | 22 – 28 December 2019 | Typhoon | 150 km/h (90 mph) | 970 hPa (28.64 inHg) | Luzon, Visayas | ₱4.38 billion | 57 | 6 | |
| 28 names | References for names retired: | | | | | | ₱275 billion | 9,831 | 2,398 | |

=== Names retired in the 2020s ===
| Name | Replacement | Dates active | Category | Sustained wind speeds | Pressure | Provinces affected | Damage (PHP) | Deaths | Missing | Refs |
|---|---|---|---|---|---|---|---|---|---|---|
| Ambo (Vongfong) | Aghon | 9 – 18 May 2020 | Typhoon | 155 km/h (100 mph) | 960 hPa (28.35 inHg) | Luzon, Visayas | ₱1.57 billion | None | None | |
| Quinta (Molave) | Querubin | 23 – 29 October 2020 | Typhoon | 165 km/h (105 mph) | 945 hPa (27.91 inHg) | Luzon | ₱4.22 billion | 27 | 4 | |
| Rolly (Goni) | Romina | 31 October – 2 November 2020 | Super Typhoon | 220 km/h (140 mph) | 905 hPa (26.72 inHg) | Luzon | ₱17.9 billion | 25 | 6 | |
| Ulysses (Vamco) | Upang (unused) | 9 – 12 November 2020 | Typhoon | 155 km/h (100 mph) | 955 hPa (28.20 inHg) | Luzon | ₱20.2 billion | 51 | None | |
| Jolina (Conson) | Jacinto | 5 – 13 September 2021 | Typhoon | 120 km/h (75 mph) | 985 hPa (29.09 inHg) | Luzon, Visayas | ₱1.41 billion | 20 | 4 | |
| Maring (Kompasu) | Mirasol | 7 – 14 October 2021 | Severe tropical storm | 100 km/h (65 mph) | 975 hPa (28.79 inHg) | Luzon | ₱7.39 billion | 43 | 16 | |
| Odette (Rai) | Opong | 11 – 21 December 2021 | Super Typhoon | 195 km/h (120 mph) | 915 hPa (27.02 inHg) | Visayas, Mindanao, Palawan | ₱51.7 billion | 405 | 52 | |
| Agaton (Megi) | Ada | 8 – 12 April 2022 | Tropical storm | 75 km/h (45 mph) | 996 hPa (29.41 inHg) | Visayas, Mindanao | ₱2.27 billion | 214 | 132 | |
| Florita (Ma-on) | Francisco | 20 – 26 August 2022 | Severe tropical storm | 110 km/h (70 mph) | 985 hPa (29.09 inHg) | Luzon | ₱2.43 billion | 3 | None | |
| Karding (Noru) | Kiyapo | 21 September – 1 October 2022 | Super Typhoon | 195 km/h (120 mph) | 920 hPa (27.17 inHg) | Luzon | ₱3.3 billion | 12 | 5 | |
| Paeng (Nalgae) | Pilandok | 26 October – 3 November 2022 | Severe tropical storm | 100 km/h (65 mph) | 980 hPa (28.94 inHg) | Luzon, Visayas, Mindanao | ₱9.43 billion | 168 | 27 | |
| Egay (Doksuri) | Emil (unused) | 20 – 27 July 2023 | Super typhoon | 185 km/h (115 mph) | 925 hPa (27.32 inHg) | Luzon, Visayas | ₱15.1 billion | 30 | 9 | |
| Goring (Saola) | Gavino (unused) | 22 August – 3 September 2023 | Super typhoon | 195 km/h (120 mph) | 920 hPa (27.17 inHg) | Luzon | ₱2.42 billion | 2 | 2 | |
| Aghon (Ewiniar) | Amuyao (unused) | 23 – 29 May 2024 | Typhoon | 140 km/h (85 mph) | 965 hPa (28.50 inHg) | Luzon, Visayas | ₱1.03 billion | 6 | None | |
| Enteng (Yagi) | Edring (unused) | 1 – 3 September 2024 | Severe tropical storm | 110 km/h (70 mph) | 975 hPa (28.79 inHg) | Luzon | ₱2.61 billion | 21 | 26 | |
| Julian (Krathon) | Josefa (unused) | 26 September – 1 October 2024 | Super typhoon | 195 km/h (120 mph) | 920 hPa (27.17 inHg) | Luzon | ₱1.57 billion | 5 | 1 | |
| Kristine (Trami) | Kidul (unused) | 20 – 25 October 2024 | Severe tropical storm | 100 km/h (65 mph) | 980 hPa (28.94 inHg) | Luzon, Visayas, Mindanao | ₱18.4 billion | 159 | 22 | |
| Leon (Kong-rey) | Lekep (unused) | 26 – 31 October 2024 | Super Typhoon | 185 km/h (115 mph) | 925 hPa (27.32 inHg) | Luzon | ₱18.4 billion | 159 | 22 | |
| Nika (Toraji) | Nanolay (unused) | 8 – 12 November 2024 | Typhoon | 130 km/h (80 mph) | 975 hPa (28.79 inHg) | Luzon | ₱3.75 billion | 14 | 2 | |
| Ofel (Usagi) | Onos (unused) | 11 – 16 November 2024 | Super Typhoon | 185 km/h (115 mph) | 940 hPa (27.76 inHg) | Luzon | ₱3.75 billion | 14 | 2 | |
| Pepito (Man-yi) | Puwok (unused) | 14 – 18 November 2024 | Super Typhoon | 195 km/h (120 mph) | 925 hPa (27.32 inHg) | Luzon, Visayas, Mindanao | ₱3.75 billion | 14 | 2 | |
| Crising (Wipha) | Chico (unused) | 16 – 23 July 2025 | Severe tropical storm | 100 km/h (65 mph) | 980 hPa (28.94 inHg) | Luzon | ₱21.4 billion | 34 | 7 | |
| Emong (Co-May) | Elias (unused) | 22 July – 1 August 2025 | Typhoon | 120 km/h (75 mph) | 975 hPa (28.79 inHg) | Luzon | ₱21.4 billion | 34 | 7 | |
| Mirasol (Mitag) | Magyawan (unused) | 16 – 20 September 2025 | Tropical storm | 95 km/h (60 mph) | 998 hPa (29.47 inHg) | Luzon | ₱4.97 billion | None | 1 | |
| Nando (Ragasa) | Nilad (unused) | 17 – 23 September 2025 | Super typhoon | 205 km/h (125 mph) | 905 hPa (26.72 inHg) | Luzon | ₱4.97 billion | 4 | 11 | |
| Opong (Bualoi) | Omar (unused) | 23 – 29 September 2025 | Typhoon | 130 km/h (80 mph) | 980 hPa (28.94 inHg) | Luzon, Visayas | ₱4.97 billion | 42 | 14 | |
| Tino (Kalmaegi) | Tala (unused) | 31 October – 7 November 2025 | Typhoon | 150 km/h (90 mph) | 968 hPa (28.59 inHg) | Visayas, Mindanao, Palawan | ₱3.26 billion | 269 | 119 | |
| Uwan (Fung-wong) | Urbano (unused) (Note: The name Upang was meant to replace Uwan, but was later changed to Urbano as the former name was already used as the replacement name for Ulysses.) | 3 – 13 November 2025 | Super Typhoon | 185 km/h (115 mph) | 935 hPa (27.61 inHg) | Luzon, Visayas, Mindanao | ₱4.92 billion | 33 | 3 | |
| 28 names | References for names retired: (Note: Reference for the retired names and the names that replaced them in 2021.) (Note: Reference for the retired names and the names that replaced them in 2022.) (Note: Reference for the retired names and the names that replaced them in 2023.) (Note: Reference for the retired names and the names that replaced them in 2024.) (Note: Reference for the retired names and the names that replaced them in 2025.) | | | | | | ₱197 billion | 1,603 | 626 | |

== See also ==
- Typhoons in the Philippines
- List of retired Atlantic hurricane names
- List of retired Pacific hurricane names
- List of retired Pacific typhoon names
- List of retired Australian cyclone names
- List of retired South Pacific tropical cyclone names
