= List of storms named Merbok =

The name Merbok (Malay: merbok, [mər.bok]) has been used for four tropical cyclones in the western North Pacific Ocean. The name was contributed by Malaysia and refers to the zebra dove (Geopelia striata) in Malay.

- Tropical Storm Merbok (2004) (T0426, Violeta) – brought heavy flooding to Luzon during mid-November 2004, was not recognized by the Joint Typhoon Warning Center.
- Tropical Storm Merbok (2011) (T1110, 12W) – not a threat to land.
- Tropical Storm Merbok (2017) (T1702, 04W) – made landfall just east of Hong Kong.
- Typhoon Merbok (2022) (T2213, 15W) – a Category 1 typhoon which later affected Alaska as a strong extratropical storm.

Preceded by Muifa	Pacific typhoon season names Merbok	Succeeded by Nanmadol
