= Typhoon Nanmadol (2011) =

Pacific typhoon in 2011

Typhoon Nanmadol (Mina)
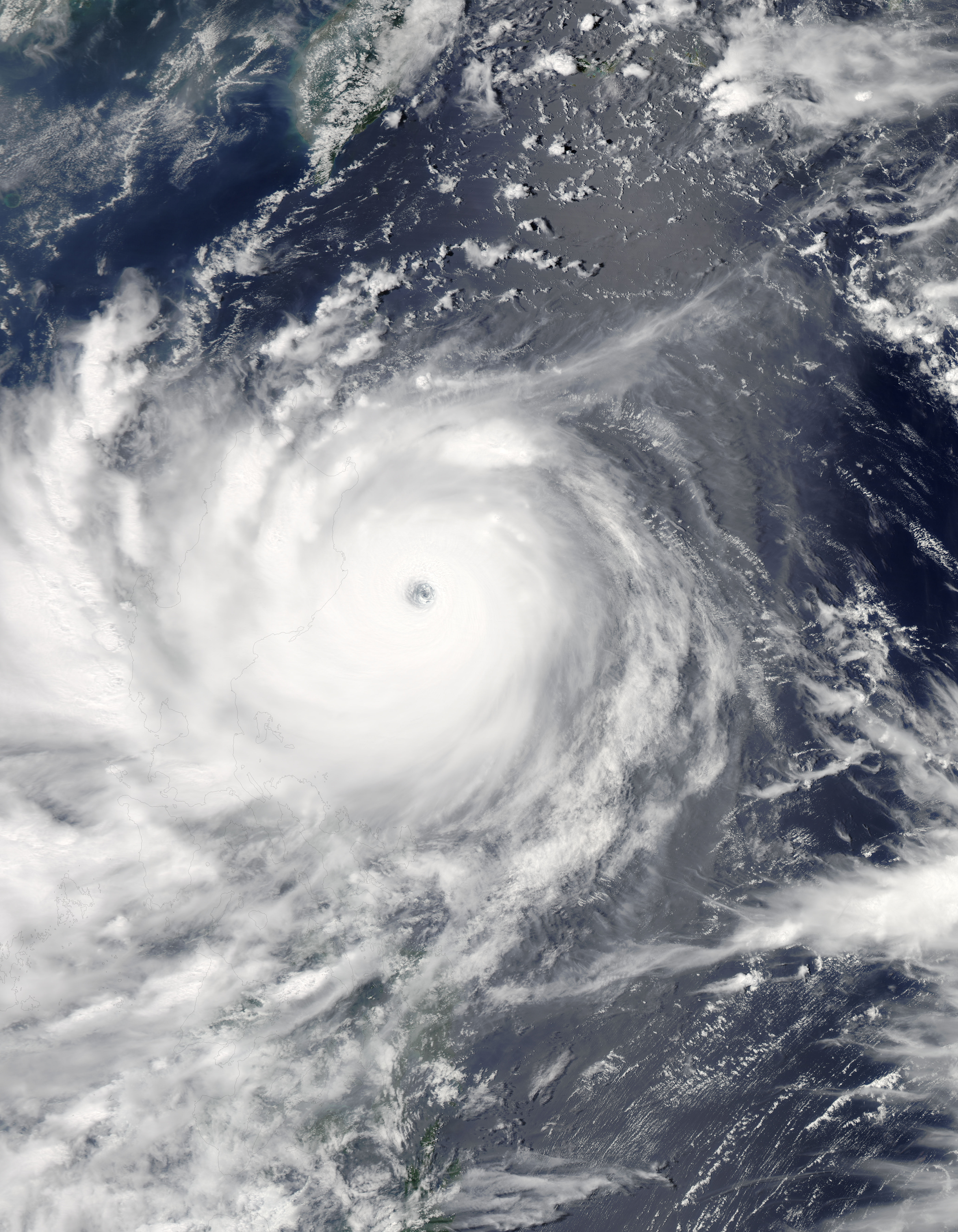
- Nanmadol at peak intensity approaching the Philippines on August 26

Meteorological history
- Formed: August 21, 2011
- Dissipated: August 31, 2011

Very strong typhoon
- 10-minute sustained (JMA)
- Highest winds: 185 km/h (115 mph)
- Lowest pressure: 925 hPa (mbar); 27.32 inHg

Category 5-equivalent super typhoon
- 1-minute sustained (SSHWS/JTWC)
- Highest winds: 260 km/h (160 mph)
- Lowest pressure: 918 hPa (mbar); 27.11 inHg

Overall effects
- Fatalities: 38 confirmed
- Damage: $1.49 billion (2011 USD)
- Areas affected: Philippines, Taiwan, China
- IBTrACS
- Part of the 2011 Pacific typhoon season

Typhoon Nanmadol, (Note: The name Nanmadol (Pohnpeian: Nan Madol, [nɐn mɐtol]) was contributed by the Federated States of Micronesia and refers to Nan Madol, an archaelogical site in Pohnpeian.) known in the Philippines as Typhoon Mina, was the strongest tropical cyclone in 2011 to hit the Philippines and also the second most intense tropical cyclone worldwide in 2011, and the first of the year to directly impact Taiwan and the rest of the Republic of China (ROC). Becoming the eleventh named storm, the seventh severe tropical storm and the fourth typhoon of the 2011 Pacific typhoon season, Nanmadol made a total of three landfalls killing 26, and causing widespread damage worth US$26,464,591. The area of low pressure that was about to become Nanmadol formed on August 19. It drifted north and became a tropical depression on August 21, a tropical storm on August 23 and a typhoon on the same night. Nanmadol reached peak strength with winds of 100 knots (185 km/h; 115 mph) (10-minute sustained) and 140 knots (260 km/h; 160 mph) (1-minute sustained) threatening the Philippines with heavy rain and flash flooding.

The Filipinos were warned about high waves, strong winds and very heavy rains over the weekend with storm signal 4 raised in parts of the Nation. There, strong winds toppled trees, power and communication lines triggering power outages in the provinces of Cagayan and Isabela. Rivers swelled up on receiving tons on rainwater, overflowing at least six bridges across the two provinces. The typhoon hardly moved in 24 hours bringing relentless rains to the archipelago causing the retaining wall of Baguio's dump facility to collapse. Also, major power lines in the nation were pulled down causing total power failures in Benguet, Cagayan, Apayao, Kalinga and mountain provinces.

The 2011 Typhoon Nanmadol is not to be confused with other typhoons of the same name that also happened in the northwestern Pacific Ocean in 2004, 2017, and 2022.

== Meteorological history ==
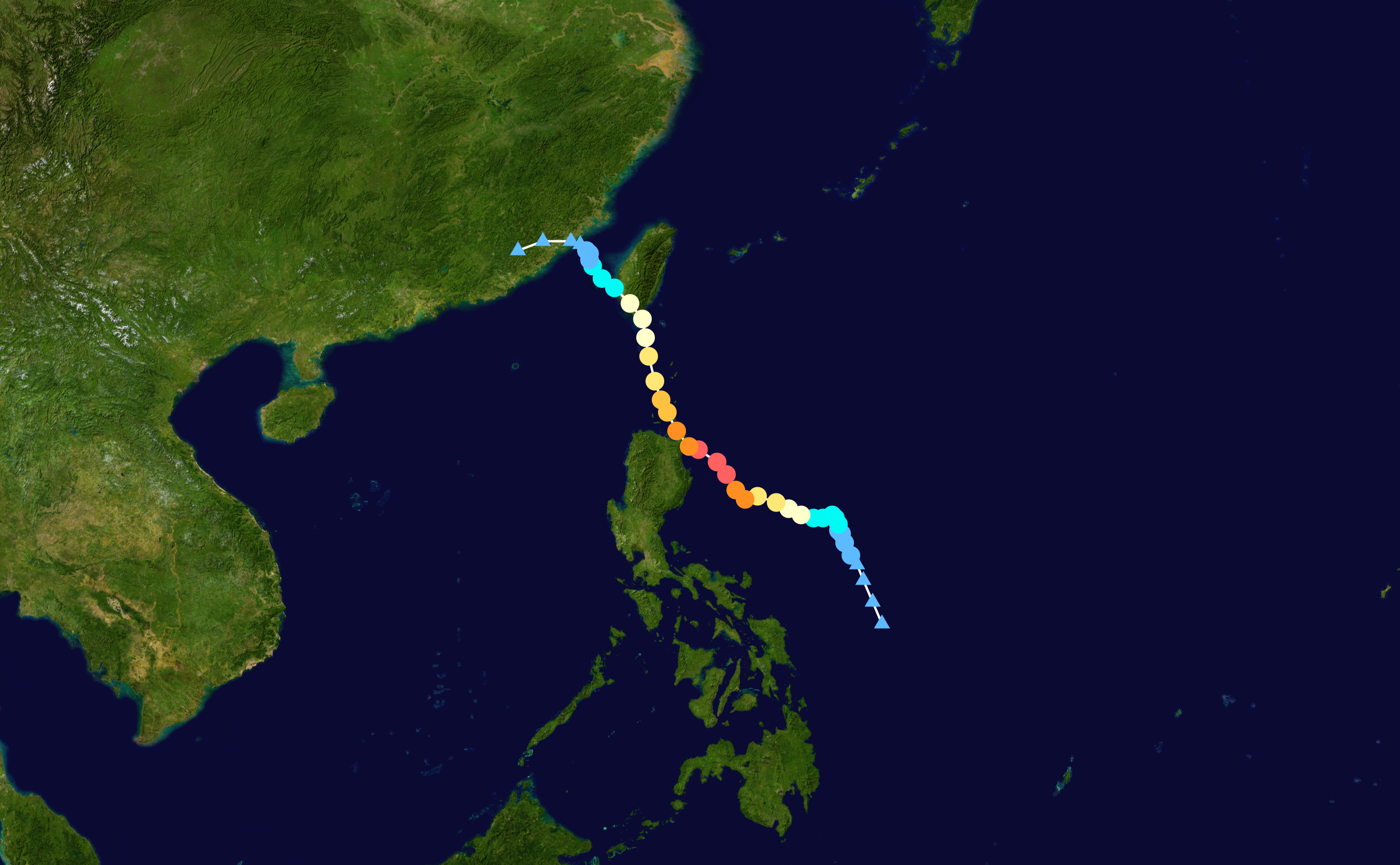
Map plotting the storm's track and intensity, according to the Saffir–Simpson scale Map key Saffir–Simpson scale Tropical depression (≤38 mph, ≤62 km/h) Tropical storm (39–73 mph, 63–118 km/h) Category 1 (74–95 mph, 119–153 km/h) Category 2 (96–110 mph, 154–177 km/h) Category 3 (111–129 mph, 178–208 km/h) Category 4 (130–156 mph, 209–251 km/h) Category 5 (≥157 mph, ≥252 km/h) Unknown Storm type Tropical cyclone Subtropical cyclone Extratropical cyclone, remnant low, tropical disturbance, or monsoon depression

Late on August 19, an area of low pressure developed to the north of Palau. Early on August 20, the system became more organized and developed a low-level circulation center. The system then turned north and continued to drift north until on August 21, when the Japan Meteorological Agency (JMA) upgraded the low-pressure area to a tropical depression east of Philippines. The Joint Typhoon Warning Center (JTWC) also issued a Tropical Cyclone Formation Alert (TCFA) on the system reporting that the system was becoming more well organized. Later that day, the Philippine Atmospheric, Geophysical and Astronomical Services Administration (PAGASA) started monitoring the system as a tropical depression and named it Mina. Late on August 22, the system became more well organized prompting the JTWC to initiate advisories on the system, designating it 14W.

On August 23, the JMA upgraded 14W to a tropical storm, naming it Nanmadol. Overnight, the system continued to intensify and early on August 24, the JMA upgraded Nanmadol to a severe tropical storm. Later that day, convective banding improved and Nanmadol developed an eye-like feature. As a result, Nanmadol continued to intensify rapidly and became a typhoon, by midnight, that day. The JTWC originally anticipated a fujiwhara effect of Nanmadol on Talas, a weaker tropical cyclone to the east of Nanmadol. However, the two cyclones moved far away from each other with at least a 1,000 nautical miles (1,900 km; 1,200 mi) of distance between them. This prompted the JTWC to change its forecast on the system, from turning east and interacting with Talas, to move west and hit the Philippines. On August 26, Nanmadol reached peak strength with winds of 100 knots (190 km/h; 120 mph) (10-minute sustained) and 140 knots (260 km/h; 160 mph) (1-minute sustained) reaching category 5 status on the SSHS. The typhoon developed a large eye with a diameter of 18 nautical miles (33 km; 21 mi) with highly symmetric deep convective bands wrapped into it.

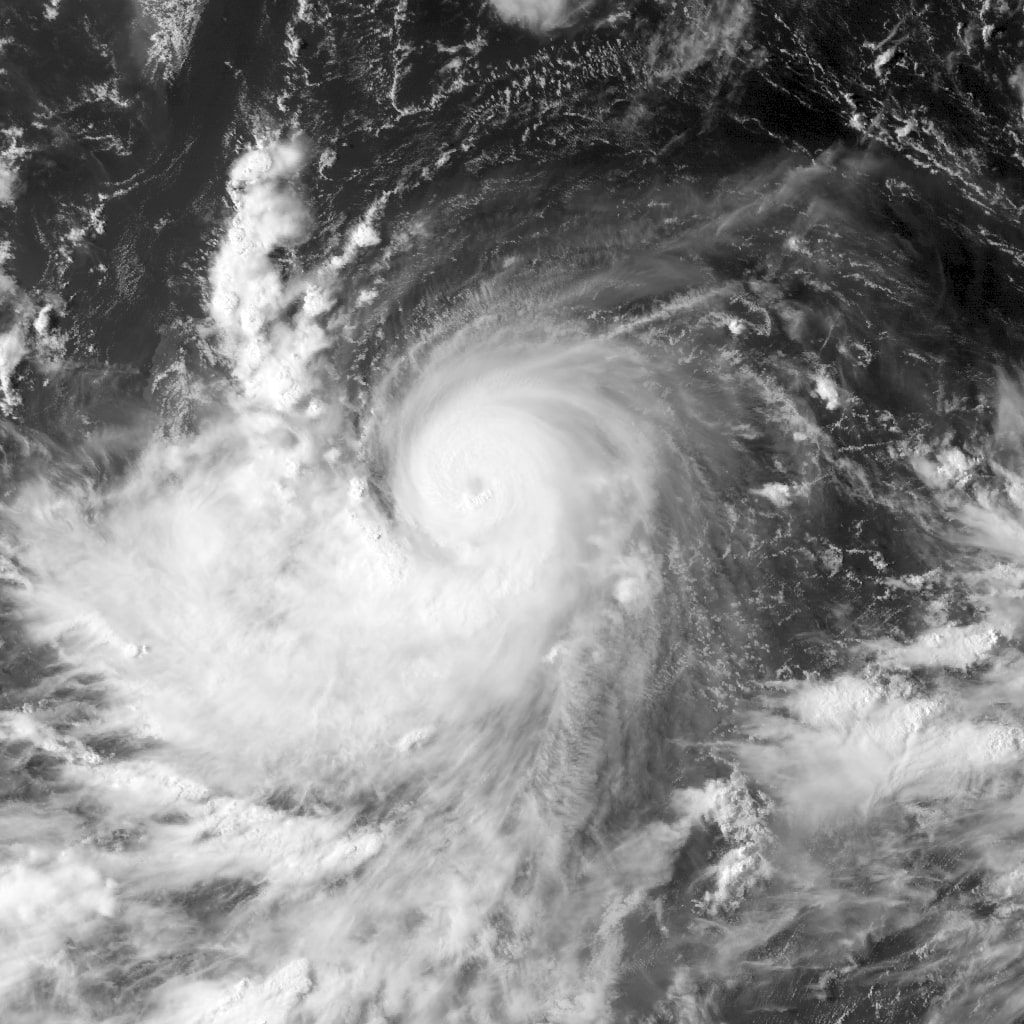
Typhoon Nanmadol rapidly intensifying off the Philippine coast on August 25

Nanmadol continued to drift north west and made landfall over Gonzaga, Cagayan, Philippines with strong winds of over 95 knots (176 km/h; 109 mph). After interacting with land, the eye of Nanmadol became cloud filled and the eyewall in the northern semicircle became eroded causing the system to weaken. However, the typhoon maintained tightly curved convective banding and central convection for long time after the landfall. The typhoon maintained a favorable upper level outflow, though located in a mid-level subtropical ridge. As Nanmadol started moving away from Luzon, the eye became more evident and central convection became re-consolidated with curved banding. However, the typhoon did not maintain this for long. Nanmadol could not recover very well from interacting with land and started weakening as the cloud tops were warming up and the eye was being filled with clouds again. During the early hours of August 28, Nanmadol struggled to strengthen after passing over the Babuyan Islands. The eye became completely cloud-filled and the outermost rainbands crossed over Taiwan. This prompted the JMA to downgrade Nanmadol to a severe tropical storm. Later that day, the central convection started depleting as the system approached southern Taiwan. At that time, it was located approximately 245 nautical miles (454 km; 282 mi) south of Taipei in the periphery of a mid-level subtropical ridge. Nanmadol continued to weaken as it approached Taiwan and the winds rapidly decreased to under 75 knots (139 km/h; 86 mph) (1-minute sustained), making Nanmadol a minimal typhoon on the SSHS. It maintained a poorly defined eyewall to its south with convective banding wrapped into the cloud filled center.

Late on August 28, Nanmadol made its second landfall over Dawu Township in Taitung County, Taiwan and started weakening. After a tremendous burst of convection over southern Taiwan, land interaction severely weakened the system. A strong subtropical ridge towards the north-east of the storm started pushing Nanmadol towards the northwest at an increasingly fast pace. Soon, Nanmadol accelerated towards the northwest and entered the Taiwan Strait, with fragmented convective bands wrapped into an adequately defined center. Landfall weakened the system rapidly prompting the JTWC to downgrade Nanmadol to a tropical storm with winds of under 50 knots (93 km/h; 58 mph). Eventually, the JMA too downgraded Nanmadol to a tropical storm with winds of under 45 knots (83 km/h; 52 mph). At that time, it was located to the west of Tainan, Taiwan with 30 knots (56 km/h; 35 mph) winds spreading 220 nautical miles (410 km; 250 mi) towards the north-east and 140 nautical miles (260 km; 160 mi) towards the south-west.

On August 30, Nanmadol slowed moving and became almost stationary. The low level circulation center became exposed and the curved convective banding moved to the south of the system. Soon it started experiencing strong wind shear and continued weakening. The shear pushed convection approximately 70 knots (130 km/h; 81 mph) south of the LLCC. The system also accelerated towards China at 08 knots (15 km/h; 9.2 mph) and weakened to a minimal tropical storm. After its third landfall over Fujian, China, Nanmadol weakened rapidly prompting both the JTWC and the JMA to issue their final warnings on the system.

== Preparations ==
=== Philippines ===
==== Highest Public Storm Warning Signal ====
PSWS#	Luzon	Visayas	Mindanao
4	Northern Cagayan, Babuyan Group of Islands	None	None
3	Isabela, Apayao, Rest of Cagayan, Batanes Group of Islands	None	None
2	Northern Aurora, Quirino, Ifugao, Mt. Province, Kalinga, Ilocos Norte, Ilocos Sur, Abra, Benguet, La Union	None	None
1	Rest of Aurora, Nueva Vizcaya, Nueva Ecija, Pangasinan, Tarlac, Zambales	None	None

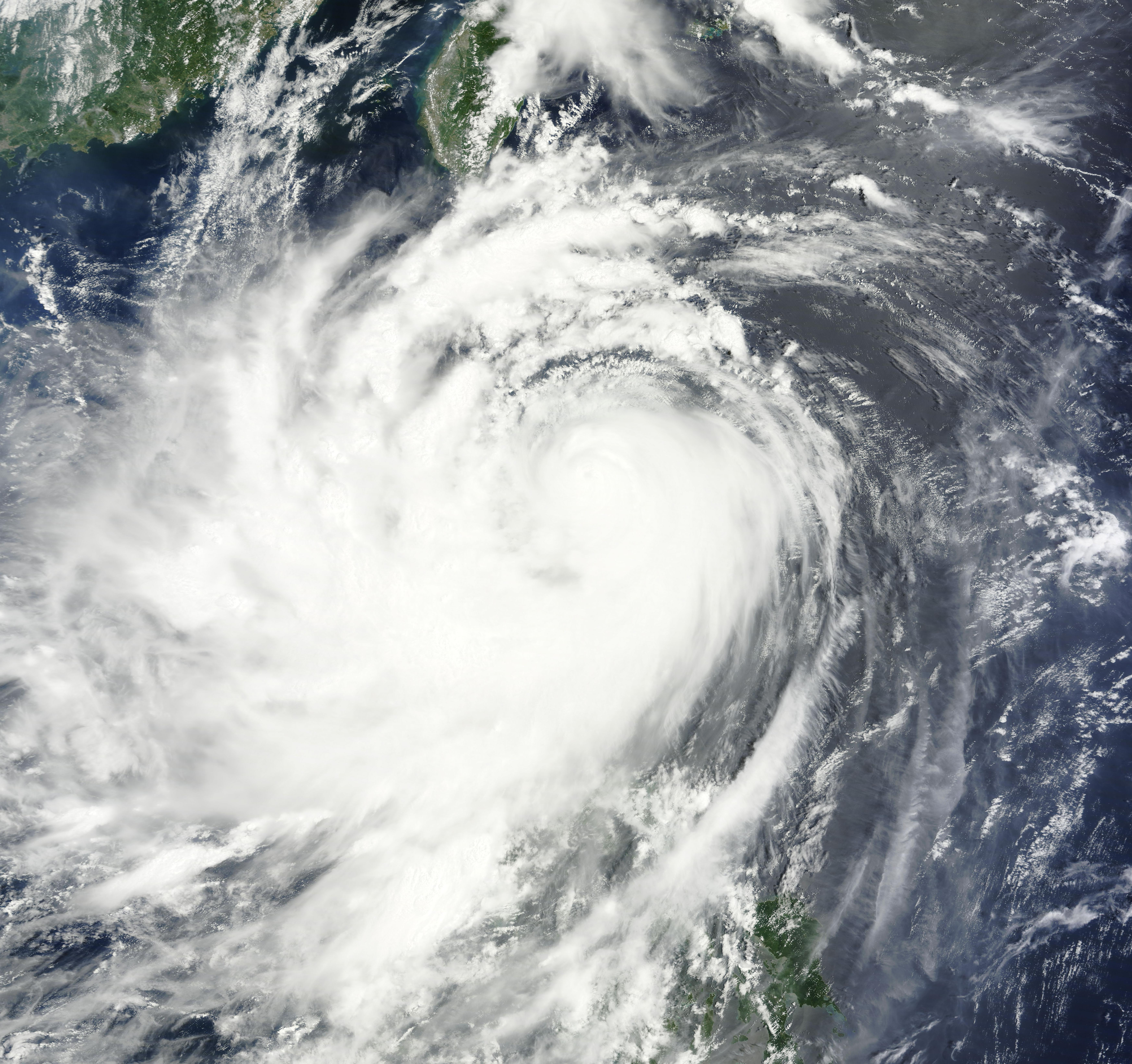
Typhoon Nanmadol making landfall in the Philippines on August 27

On August 25, the residents of northern Philippines started preparing for Nanmadol, as the Philippine government advised them about heavy rain and flash flooding after the slow moving typhoon brushes the coasts. On the next day, as the Nanmadol became dangerously strong, storm warning signal 3 was raised over the provinces of Isabela and Cagayan, including the Babuyan Islands. Residents were warned about high waves, strong winds and very heavy rains over the weekend. Also, people living in low-lying areas were instructed to prepare for flash flooding and landslides. The Philippine Department of Health issued a white alert to its subordinates all along Nanmadol's path, ordering them to stock up on medicines and supplies so that the victims need not purchase them at the time of need.

As Nanmadol continued to intensify rapidly, storm signal was upgraded to 4 in some parts of Cagayan. Quickly, the Philippine National Police were fully activated as Nanmadol intensified on nearing the north east Philippine coasts. The PNP were ordered to be in close coordination with the Armed Forces of the Philippines and the Office of Civil Defense. Also, the Philippine Atmospheric, Geophysical and Astronomical Services Administration reported that though Nanmadol was intensifying rapidly, heavy rains were no longer expected. The PAGASA said that unlike Ketsana in 2009, Nanmadol carried less rainwater and would dump less rain when compared to Ketsana. On August 27, several flights were cancelled as the typhoon drifted closer to Philippines unexpectedly. Several sea vessels were also warned about very rough sea conditions over the weekend.

=== Taiwan ===
On August 26, the Central Weather Bureau issued a sea warning as they were no longer expecting a Fujiwhara effect, which could possibly pull Nanmadol away from Taiwan. Nanmadol was anticipated to brush Taiwan's eastern coast. All ships passing through the Bashi Channel were warned to stay updated about the typhoon. Also, Taiwanese residents were warned about possible heavy rains and strong winds from Monday, August 29.

On August 27, the Central Emergency Operation Center of Taiwan announced that they were completely prepared for any kind of contingencies triggered by the typhoon. Also, the police in Hualien set up a blockade to prevent people from approaching the seashore where high waves have been detected. Also, the residents of the Pingtung and Taitung counties were asked to prepare for torrential downpour and strong winds. The Opposition Democratic Progressive Party postponed their national congress meeting for the safety of party members and to allow its workers to focus on typhoon relief work.

On August 28, Ma Ying-jeou, the President of the Republic of China ordered evacuations of thousands of people from vulnerable areas, saying that a slow moving typhoon could result in more damages and casualties than normal. The Defense Ministry of Taiwan mobilized some 35,000 soldiers to be ready to help out as many people as possible when the typhoon strikes. The soldiers were in possession of portable power generators, water pumps and amphibious assault vehicles.

On August 29, offices and schools were shut and a yellow alert, the second lowest in the nation's four-level rainstorm alert system was issued by the National Marine Environmental Forecasting Center. Also, the Taiwan Railway Administration halted services on the South-Link Line in fear that heavy rain could trigger landslides and cause rail-accidents. The Directorate General of Highways closed the Suhua Highway saying that the area through which the highway was built is more prone to landslides during typhoons.

=== China ===
After Nanmadol left the island nation of Taiwan and entered the Taiwan Strait, Local authorities started calling back several thousands of ships informing them about the heavy rain the typhoon was pouring. The Maritime affairs bureaus of Fuzhou, Putian, Quanzhou, Xiamen and Zhangzhou cities activated the red warning, the highest level on the Chinese scale, ordering all ships to return to the harbor as soon as possible. The storm was expected to bring heavy torrential rains and flash flooding as is makes landfall on the southern part of Fujian province. For safety insurance, bullet trains along the Wenzhou-Fuzhou and Fuzhou-Xiamen high-speed rail lines were ordered to either operate slowly or suspend services completely if the surveillance system detects any hazards. Also, the shipping route linking Xiamen, in east China's Fujian Province, and Kinmen (Quemoy), in Taiwan was closed at 14:00 local time as the storm entered the strait. The seawalls originally built to resist Nanmadol's strong storm surge were discovered with several cracks, each measuring two meters in length along Jinjiang's coast in the village of Weitou.

== Impact ==
Impact by country or region
Country	Casualties			Damage (USD)
Country	Deaths	Injuries	Missing	Damage (USD)
Philippines	35	37	8	$907.9 million
Taiwan	1	0	0	$502.6 million
China	2	20	6	$83.13 million
Total	38	57	14	$1.49 billion

=== Philippines ===
On August 23, the system's rainbands caused heavy rains in the Philippines's Zamboanga del Sur province triggering a landslide. No one was reported to be dead or injured however. On August 26, the National Disaster Risk Reduction and Management Council (NDRRMC) reported that one fisherman went missing after local residents reported that they found his banca empty. On that day, the typhoon spawned a tornado in the Biliran Province blowing out three school buildings. No children were reported to be dead or injured although.

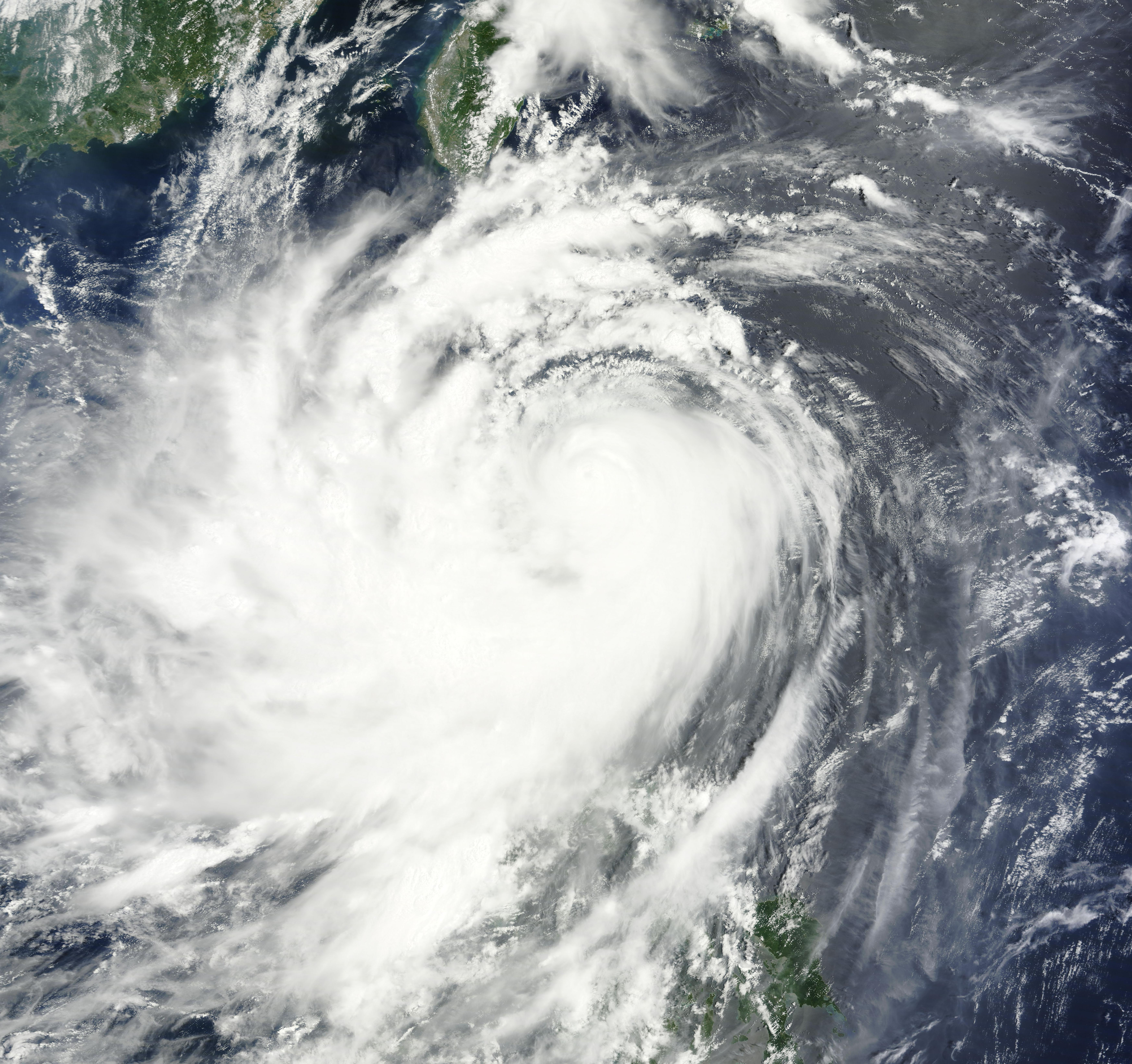
Typhoon Nanmadol over northern Luzon, Philippines on August 27

On August 27, Nanmadol lashed into the northern tip of the nation bringing heavy rains, causing landslides. Nanmadol, the strongest typhoon to affect the Philippines in 2011, killed two children in a landslide and left two fishermen missing. Later, the NDRRMC started forced evacuations in some areas of the Cagayan province after storm warning signal 4 has been raised. The typhoon's eye passed over the city of Santa Ana with the 24-hour rainfall accumulation over 400 millimetres (16 in). The typhoon also enhanced the Southwest Monsoonal Flow across the Philippines bringing heavy rains and squalls. Another big issue was that the typhoon slowed down after landfall and did not move much in six hours, leaving the northern half of the nation in danger for a longer period of time. Some thirteen families were evacuated from the Isabela province which was earlier hit by the typhoon as the governed ordered dam officials to release water if conditions worsen at the Magat Dam. Nanmadol's strong winds toppled trees, power and communication lines triggering power outages in the provinces of Cagayan and Isabela. Also, the system spawned another tornado which blew out some 18 houses in the Ilocos Norte province. Rivers swelled up on receiving tons on rainwater, overflowing at least six bridges across the two provinces. Another landslide in the Cordillera region blocked zig-zag shaped roads lying between mountains. Late on the day, the NDRRMC reported that by then, Nanmadol killed 6, injured 7 and left 6 more missing. They also added that several towns in Ilocos Norte were completely submerged by floodwater. Several roads in the provinces of Ilocos Sur, La Union and Pangasinan. The typhoon hardly moved in 24 hours bringing relentless rains to the archipelago causing the retaining wall of Baguio's dump facility to collapse. Also, major power lines in the nation were pulled down causing total power failures in Benguet, Cagayan, Apayao, Kalinga and Mountain Provinces.

On August 28, the NDRRMC reported that the typhoon displaced a total of 108,788 people, killing 7, injuring 10 and leaving 6 more missing. A Total of 93 houses were damaged including 16 totally destroyed. A total of 9 bridges and 28 roads remained impassable as floodwater rushed on top of them. Power was restored to many provinces including Isabela communication lines were functional. The only province left without power was Aurora. On August 29, the NDRRMC further upgraded the death toll to 12, the number of injured to 21 and the number of missing to 9. They added that two people from Baguio and Benguet were killed in landslides attributed to Nanmadol. In their report, they also mentioned that the total damage to infrastructure and agriculture caused by Nanmadol was at US$22,475,672. Later the same day, the NDRRMC reported that power was fine restored in Isabela province. Also, the continued to rise the death toll, putting it at 16, and the number of missing at 8. The total damage to agriculture and infrastructure was also upgraded to US$23,748,522.

On August 30, continuing the sequential reports after the typhoon, the NDRRMC pushed up the death toll to 22; the number of injured to 23 and the number of missing to 12. Also, they reported that the total number of houses damaged was 1,316 with 32 totally destroyed. The total damage to agriculture and infrastructure was also increased to US$26,119,801. Later the same day, the NDRRMC further upgraded the death toll to 25; the number of injured to 32 and downgraded the number of missing to 7 reporting that 5 Pangasinan fishermen were rescued. Also, they included that in the wake of Nanmadol, a total of 47 incidents including 14 flashfloods, 12 landslides, 8 tornadoes, 6 sea mishaps, 1 vehicular accident, 4 collapsed structures, 1 lightning strike and 1 soil erosion were monitored. Continuing the daily situational reports, the NDRRMC on September 1, upgraded the death toll to 29, the number of injured to 37 and downgraded the number of missing to 5. They also increased the total damage from Nanmadol to agriculture and infrastructure to US$33,158,317.

On September 2, Benguet and Baguio were declared under State of Calamity by the NDRRMC. Also, the City Health Office Dagupan conducted a survey in their area of responsibility to check if there was any increase in flood-borne diseases. The NDRRMC confirmed more deaths, increasing the toll to 33, and the number of missing to 8 and the total cost of damage to agriculture and infrastructure to US$33,711,271. After thorough reanalysis, the death toll was last raised to 35 and the damage was put at US$34,521,216. Total economic losses in the Philippines were counted to be Php 40.9 billion (US$907.9 million).

=== Taiwan ===
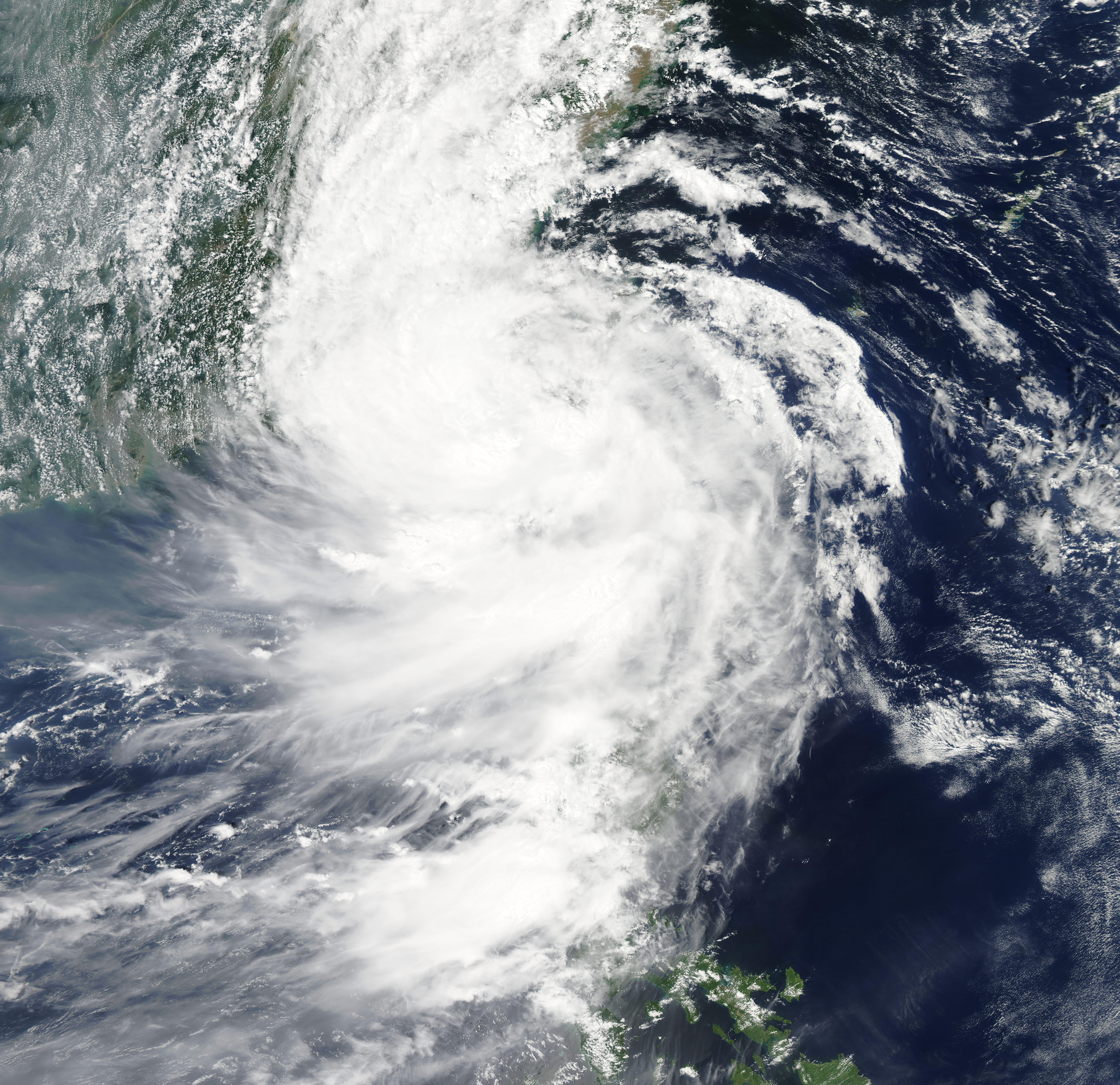
Severe Tropical Storm Nanmadol over Taiwan on August 29

As Nanmadol made landfall over Taiwan, it dumped very heavy rainfall over the nation. Some 528 millimetres (20.8 in) of rain was dumped in Hualien County; 517 millimetres (20.4 in) in Hengchun, Pingtung County; 449 millimetres (17.7 in) in Taitung County; 292 millimetres (11.5 in) in Pinglin, New Taipei; 275 millimetres (10.8 in) in Kaohsiung; and 265 millimetres (10.4 in) in Taiping Mountain, Yilan County. The heavy torrential rains soon triggered knee-high flooding across several locations in the nation. Several thousands of people were evacuated as a precaution, when Nanmadol, the first typhoon to directly impact Taiwan since Typhoon Fanapi in 2010 made landfall. The Council of Agriculture soon issued a red-alert for six riverside areas advising people that are at a high risk of mudslides after heavy torrential rains dumped by the typhoon. The early damage estimates to agriculture was reported to be at US$344,790 with bananas hit the hardest sustaining losses of more than NT$3 million. The storm started claiming lives later that day, when debris attributed to the storm hit a motorcyclist killing him almost instantly. Some 30,000 households in southern and eastern Taiwan did not have electricity, 8,000 people were evacuated and several roads and bridges were closed due to the heavy rain.

Even long after Nanmadol left Taiwan, heavy rain continued to batter the nation. Several parts of the nation saw rains of more than on meter and 1.5 meters with Pingtung County was the hardest hit of all. The total economic losses to the nation were put at NT$75.5 million (US$2.6 million). The Hengchun Township was completely inundated by the floodwaters after heavy torrential rain from Nanmadol. The rain was so heavy that a local said, "I never saw so much water in all my 60 years". On August 30, Eqecat reported that the total insured economic losses caused by Nanmadol in Taiwan could exceed US$500 million.

=== China ===
Nanmadol made landfall in China as a weak tropical cyclone bringing heavy rains, prompting local authorities to issue flood and landslide warnings. Also, a female news reporter in China literally escaped death after an unusually large version of the Qiantang River tidal bore (known locally as the "Silver Dragon") amplified by Nanmadol's storm surge rose behind her during a live report. Thousands of fishermen's livelihoods were at risks of being washed away. Evacuations were being carried out with local residents being taken to higher grounds. On August 31, authorities in China reported that the total economic losses caused by Nanmadol in China were more than 44 million yuan (6.9 million U.S. dollars) as the storm destroyed 110 houses having more than 138,000 people evacuated. In Putian City, Nanmadol claimed two lives, leaving four missing after very heavy torrential rains attributed to the storm. Bullet trains were slowed or stopped after the heavy damaged caused by Nanmadol's remnants to Fujian Province. Also, the astronomical high tide coincided with Nanmadol's storm surge bringing unusually high tides which resulted in the increase of the likelihood of coastal flooding.

On September 1, Chinese state owned news agency Xinhua reported that The storm has caused direct economic loss of 130 million yuan or US$20,354,807 with two deaths, twenty injuries and six missing in the Fujian Province. In Zhejiang Province, the torrential rains disrupted the lives of 65,600 people, with 160 houses were toppled and 4,600 hectares of crops destroyed, causing a direct economic loss of 532 million yuan (US$83.13 million).

== Aftermath ==
=== Taiwan ===
On August 31, President Ma Ying-jeou visited Pingtung County, the worst hit county to check up on evacuated victims. Unlike Morakot in 2009, Nanmadol was very well forecasted and thousands of lives were saved.

== Retirement ==
Due to the extremely high amount of damage that the storm has caused in the Philippines, PAGASA announced that the name Mina would be stricken off their tropical cyclone Naming lists. In June 2012, PAGASA chose the name Marilyn to replace Mina for the 2015 season.

In contrast, despite the damage in the Philippines and Taiwan, the international name Nanmadol was not retired; it would later be reused in the 2017 and 2022 seasons.

== See also ==
- Weather of 2011
- Tropical cyclones in 2011
- List of Philippine typhoons (2000–present)
