= Tropical Storm Merbok (2004) =

Pacific tropical cyclone

Tropical Storm Merbok (Violeta)
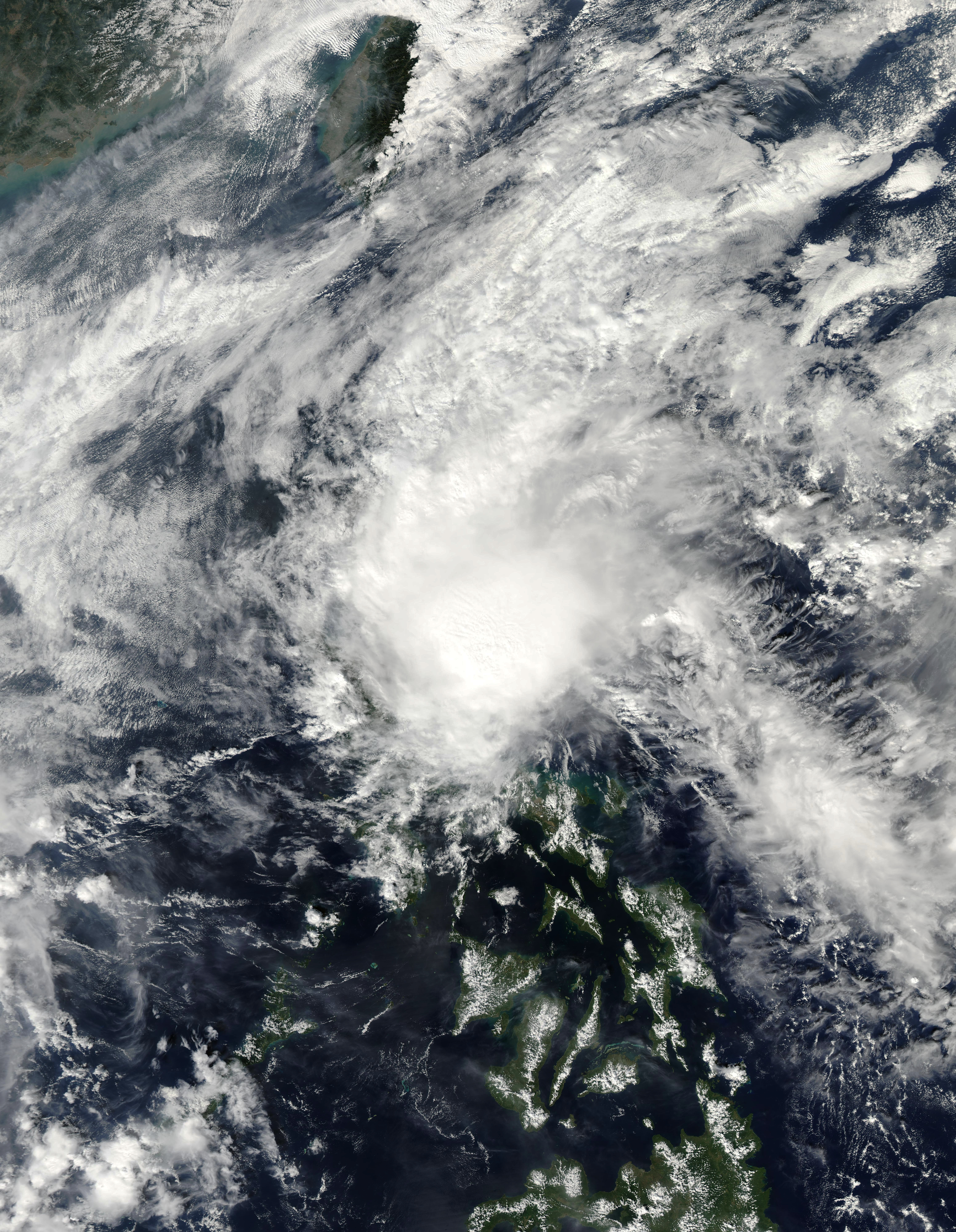
- Tropical Depression Violeta prior to strengthening to a tropical storm on November 22

Meteorological history
- Formed: November 21, 2004
- Dissipated: November 23, 2004

Tropical storm
- 10-minute sustained (JMA)
- Highest winds: 65 km/h (40 mph)
- Lowest pressure: 1000 hPa (mbar); 29.53 inHg

Overall effects
- Fatalities: 31 total
- Missing: 17
- Damage: $253 million (2004 USD)
- Areas affected: Philippines
- IBTrACS
- Part of the 2004 Pacific typhoon season

Tropical Storm Merbok, (Note: The name Merbok (Malay: merbok, [mərbok]) was contributed by Malaysia and refers to the zebra dove (Geopelia striata) in Malay.) known in the Philippines as Tropical Depression Violeta, was a weak, but destructive tropical storm which worsened the conditions in the Philippines, previously affected by Typhoon Muifa, just 2 days after that storm. This is also the first tropical cyclone recognized by the Japan Meteorological Agency, but not Joint Typhoon Warning Center, since Changmi in 2002. The fortieth tropical cyclone and twenty-ninth named storm of the very active 2004 Pacific typhoon season, the origins of Merbok can be traced from a disturbance in the Philippine Sea early on November 22, with the PAGASA first issuing advisories as Tropical Depression Violeta, to the east of Baler, Aurora. The JMA followed suit, assigning the name Merbok as it strengthened to a tropical storm; however, the PAGASA held the system as a tropical depression. The storm soon made landfall on the night of the same day, while gradually weakening over the high terrains of Luzon. The weakened system emerged off the northwest coast of the country before the last advisory was issued by the two agencies. The remnants moved to the northwest, before dissipating, southwest of Taiwan.

Throughout its passage, Merbok was blamed for 31 individuals killed and causing over ₱12.368 billion ($254 million) worth of damages across Luzon. Because of the damages exceeding billions, the Philippine name Violeta was retired and replaced with Vicky.

== Meteorological history ==
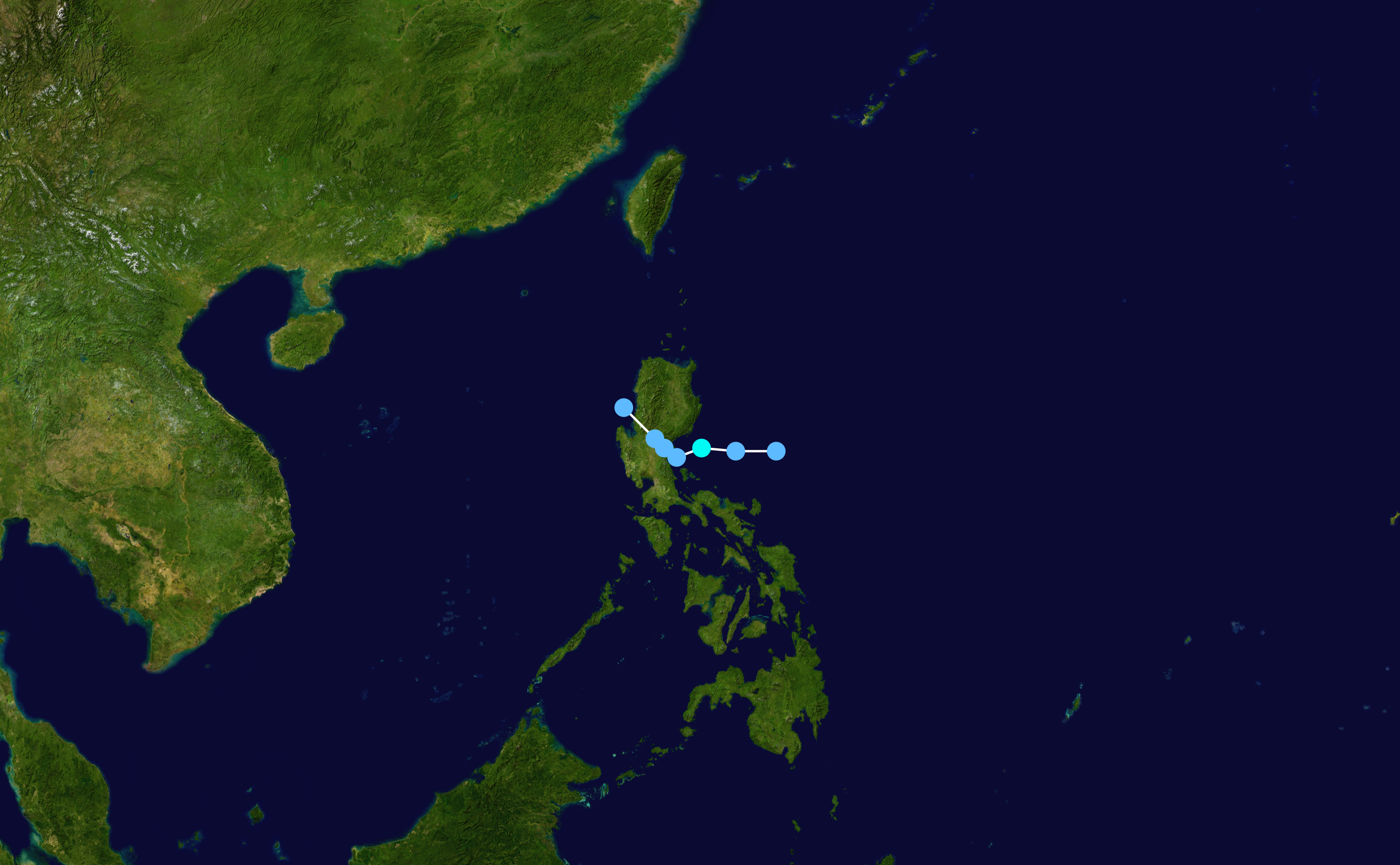
Map plotting the storm's track and intensity, according to the Saffir–Simpson scale Map key Saffir–Simpson scale Tropical depression (≤38 mph, ≤62 km/h) Tropical storm (39–73 mph, 63–118 km/h) Category 1 (74–95 mph, 119–153 km/h) Category 2 (96–110 mph, 154–177 km/h) Category 3 (111–129 mph, 178–208 km/h) Category 4 (130–156 mph, 209–251 km/h) Category 5 (≥157 mph, ≥252 km/h) Unknown Storm type Tropical cyclone Subtropical cyclone Extratropical cyclone, remnant low, tropical disturbance, or monsoon depression

== Preparations and impact ==
Merbok affected the Philippines after Typhoon Muifa (2004) stalled near Luzon before hitting the area as a Category 1 typhoon. Violeta caused landslides across Northern and Central Luzon that destroyed over 330 houses across the region. There were also reports of heavy flooding. The heaviest rainfall recorded was in Baler, peaking with 185.2 mm as the storm passed. Over 31 people died, and 187 were injured as a result of the storm.

== Aftermath and retirement ==
Less than a week after, Tropical Depression Winnie further devastated the area, with the storm becoming the 6th deadliest tropical cyclone in the country.

Due to the extensive damage caused by the storm, the Philippine name Violeta was retired and was replaced by Vicky; however, its international name, Merbok was not retired and was reused in subsequent seasons.

== See also ==
- Other tropical cyclones named Merbok
