= List of storms named Muifa =

The name Muifa (Cantonese: 梅花, [muːi˨˩ faː˥]) has been used for four tropical cyclones in the western north Pacific Ocean. The name was contributed by Macau and means plum blossom (Prunus mume) in Cantonese.

- Typhoon Muifa (2004) (T0425, 29W, Unding) – struck the Philippines, Vietnam and Thailand.
- Typhoon Muifa (2011) (T1109, 11W, Kabayan) – a Category 5 Super Typhoon which approached Japan, China and Korea.
- Tropical Storm Muifa (2017) (T1701, 03W, Dante) – a weak storm that never made landfall.
- Typhoon Muifa (2022) (T2212, 14W, Inday) – a Category 3 typhoon which hit Shanghai, China.

Preceded by Ong-mang	Pacific typhoon season names Muifa	Succeeded by Merbok
