= Typhoon Nanmadol (2004) =

Pacific typhoon in 2004

Typhoon Nanmadol (Yoyong)
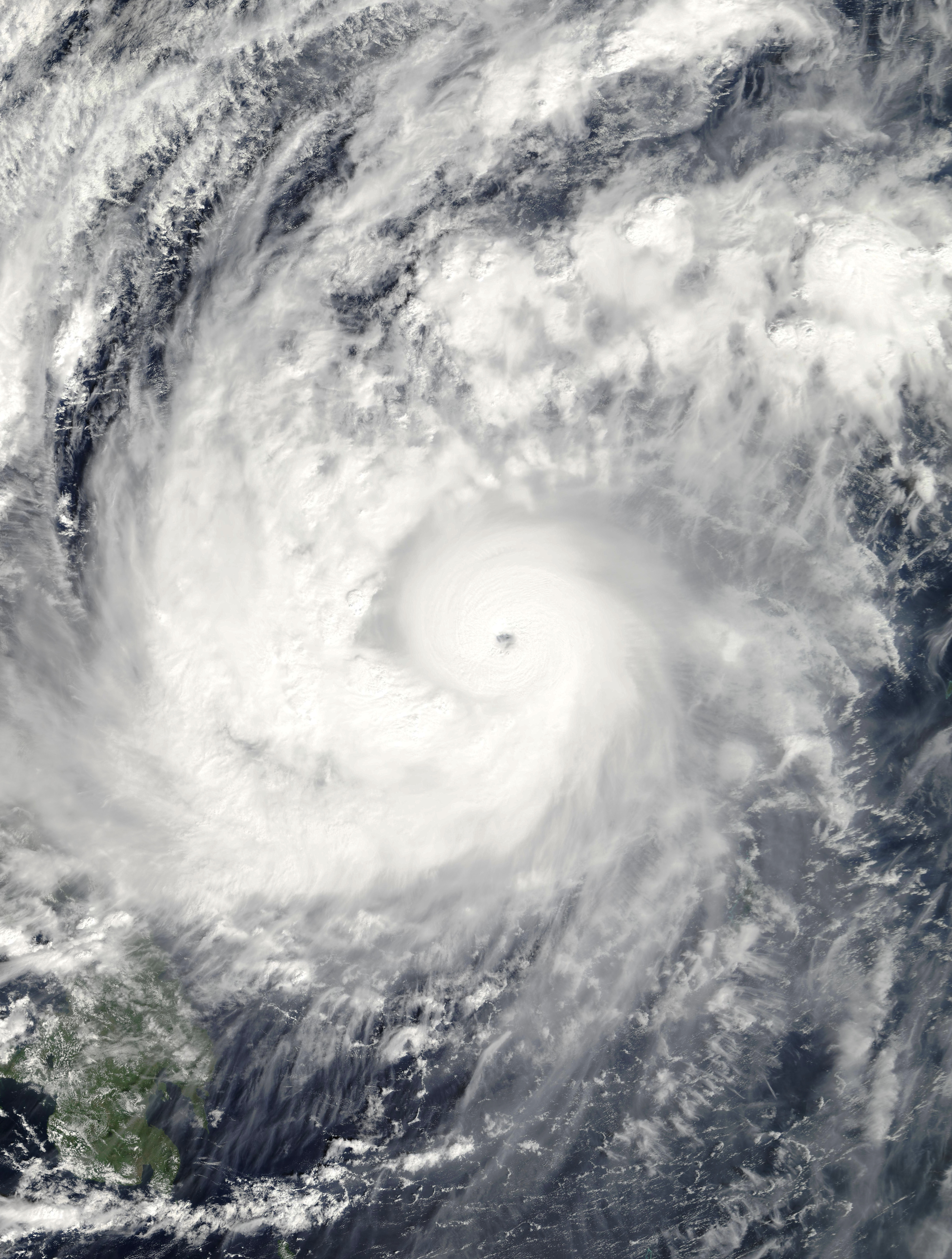
- Nanmadol near peak intensity on December 1

Meteorological history
- Formed: November 28, 2004
- Extratropical: December 4, 2004
- Dissipated: December 4, 2004

Very strong typhoon
- 10-minute sustained (JMA)
- Highest winds: 165 km/h (105 mph)
- Lowest pressure: 935 hPa (mbar); 27.61 inHg

Category 4-equivalent super typhoon
- 1-minute sustained (SSHWS/JTWC)
- Highest winds: 240 km/h (150 mph)
- Lowest pressure: 910 hPa (mbar); 26.87 inHg

Overall effects
- Fatalities: 77
- Damage: $60.8 million (2004 USD)
- Areas affected: Philippines, Taiwan, China
- IBTrACS
- Part of the 2004 Pacific typhoon season

Typhoon Nanmadol, (Note: The name Nanmadol (Pohnpeian: Nan Madol, [nɐn mɐtol]) was contributed by the Federated States of Micronesia and refers to Nan Madol, an archaelogical site in Pohnpeian.) known in the Philippines as Typhoon Yoyong, was the last of four consecutive tropical cyclones to strike the Philippines in 2004. A quickly moving system, Nanmadol brought heavy rainfall and strong winds over the same regions impacted by the previous storms, exacerbating flood conditions in Luzon and surrounding regions. Together Nanmadol and these systems accounted for around 1,000 deaths in the Philippines. The typhoon later became the first December tropical cyclone to strike Taiwan since record keeping began, bringing along with it heavy rain, which also affected nearby regions of eastern China. As an extratropical storm, Nanmadol brought gusty winds and rain to Japan.

Nanmadol developed from an isolated area of convection south-southwest of Pohnpei that became classified as a tropical depression on November 28. Within highly conducive conditions for development, the system reached tropical storm intensity the following day, followed by typhoon intensity on November 30. Quickly pacing towards the north-northwest about the periphery of a nearby subtropical ridge, Nanmadol reached its peak intensity on December 1 with winds of 165 km/h (103 mph) and a minimum barometric pressure of 935 mbar (hPa; 27.61 inHg). (Note: All maximum sustained wind values are sustained for ten minutes and rounded to the nearest five unless otherwise noted, following the standard set by the World Meteorological Organization.) Shortly after, the typhoon made landfall at a similar intensity on Casiguran, Aurora, quickly moving over Luzon before reaching the South China Sea, where it recurved northward into hostile atmospheric conditions. Over the next few days, Nanmadol weakened and later transitioned into an extratropical cyclone near Taiwan on December 4, whereafter it merged with another extratropical system.

With the typhoon approaching landfall in an area still recovering from previous storms, relief agencies already servicing the region were forced to allocate additional resources to prepare for Nanmadol. Evacuation efforts assisted in moving almost 100,000 people into shelters. Effects from Nanmadol were most severe in Cagayan Valley, where 14 people were killed. Power outages were widespread across several islands. Overall, damage from the typhoon in the Philippines totaled ₱2.23 billion (US$39.3 million). (Note: All damage totals were originally reported in 2004 United States dollars unless otherwise noted.) (Note: All currencies are converted to United States dollars using Oanada with the exchange rate on December 2, 2004.) Heavy rainfall, peaking at 1,090 mm (43 in), was documented in Taiwan. Agricultural damage in Taiwan alone reached NT$670 million (US$20.8 million). Similar effects were felt in Japan, where the remnants of Nanmadol produced record-breaking rainfall and wind. Damage was particularly significant in Aichi Prefecture, totaling JP¥69.8 million (US$680,000). Overall, Nanmadol resulted in 77 fatalities and US$60.8 million in damage across three countries.

== Meteorological history ==
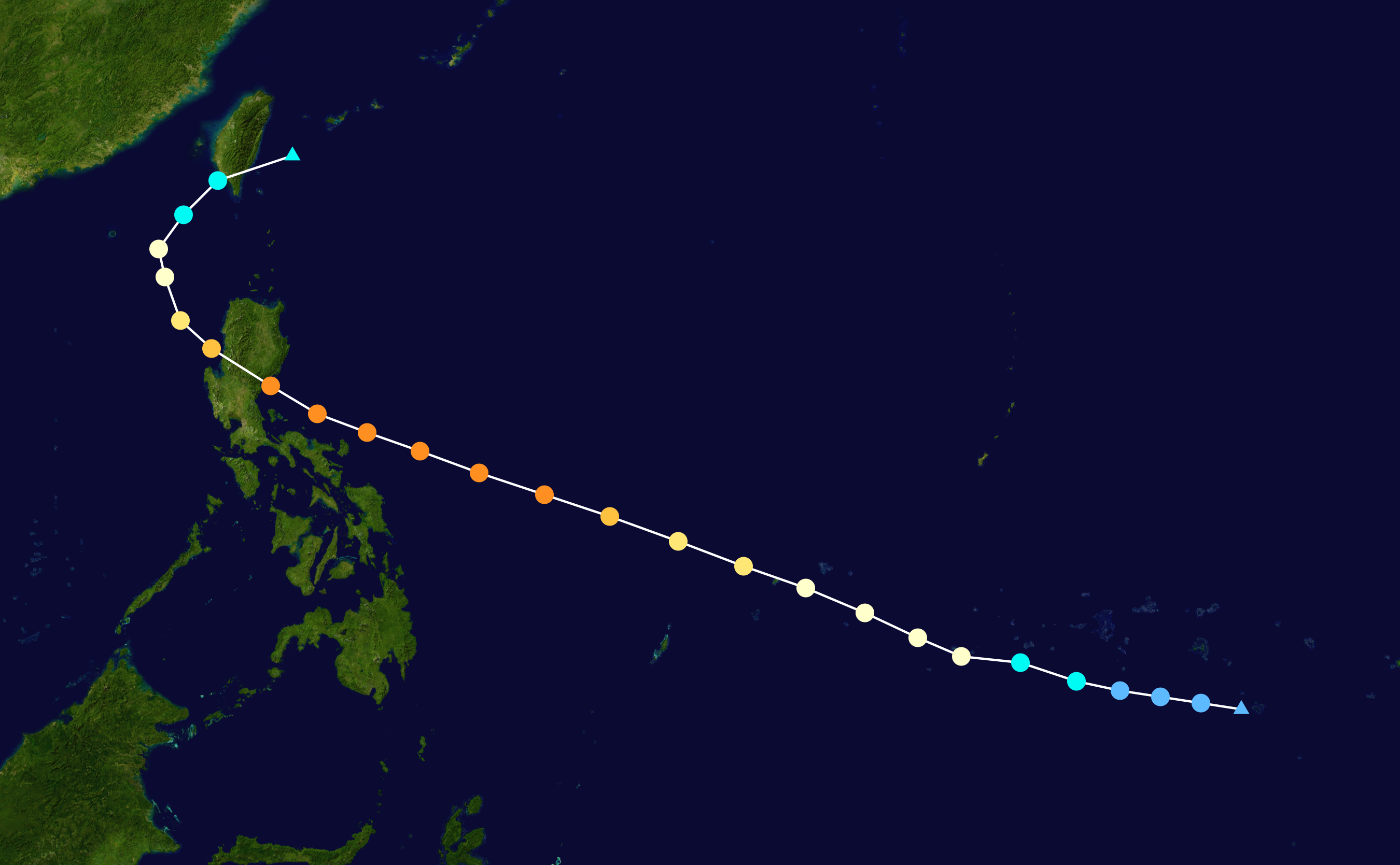
Map plotting the storm's track and intensity, according to the Saffir–Simpson scale Map key Saffir–Simpson scale Tropical depression (≤38 mph, ≤62 km/h) Tropical storm (39–73 mph, 63–118 km/h) Category 1 (74–95 mph, 119–153 km/h) Category 2 (96–110 mph, 154–177 km/h) Category 3 (111–129 mph, 178–208 km/h) Category 4 (130–156 mph, 209–251 km/h) Category 5 (≥157 mph, ≥252 km/h) Unknown Storm type Tropical cyclone Subtropical cyclone Extratropical cyclone, remnant low, tropical disturbance, or monsoon depression

The progenitor to Typhoon Nanmadol was first noted by the Joint Typhoon Warning Center (JTWC) as an isolated cluster of thunderstorms roughly 290 km (180 mi) south-southwest of Pohnpei at 2200 UTC on November 27, 2004. With convection consolidating about a potential center of circulation, the Japan Meteorological Agency (JMA) classified the broad system as a tropical depression the following day. Rapid development of storms and organization ensued following classification, spurred by favorable conditions. Tracking northwestward due to the presence of a nearby subtropical ridge to its north, the depression continued to strengthen, reaching tropical storm intensity on November 29 while 860 km (530 mi) south-southeast of Guam. At this point the tropical cyclone was assigned the name Nanmadol.

Conducive atmospheric conditions around Nanmadol on November 29 led to the development of a central dense overcast, followed shortly thereafter by the formation of an eye. Nanmadol was upgraded to severe tropical storm intensity at 0000 UTC on November 30 and became a typhoon twelve hours later, tracking near Satawal, Woleai, and Yap State during this intensification phase. Following the upgrade to typhoon status, intensification briefly slowed but continued soon thereafter. At 0600 UTC on December 1, Nanmadol reached peak intensity with maximum sustained winds of 165 km/h (103 mph) and a minimum barometric pressure of 935 mbar (hPa; 27.61 inHg), still east of the Philippines. The typhoon maintained this strength for roughly twelve hours before slightly weakening as it neared Luzon. At approximately 1200 UTC on December 2, Nanmadol made landfall near Casiguran, Aurora with winds of 140 km/h (87 mph).

Due to the rapid motion of Nanmadol, the typhoon crossed Luzon in under six hours, emerging into the South China Sea before 1800 UTC on December 2. Though land interaction with the Philippines did not significantly affect the cyclone, a shortwave trough forced Nanmadol to sharply curve northward, bringing it into hostile atmospheric conditions within the Luzon Strait. At 0000 UTC on December 3, the JMA downgraded Nanmadol to severe tropical storm status. Increased wind shear and the advection of dry air further weakened the tropical cyclone, and by midday on December 3, the storm's center of circulation became decoupled from the rest of the convection. At 2340 UTC that day, Nanmadol made landfall near Fangliao, Pingtung in Taiwan, becoming the first December tropical cyclone to strike the island in 108 years of record-keeping. Roughly six hours later on December 4, the JMA determined that Nanmadol had transitioned into an extratropical cyclone. These remnants soon merged with another low-pressure area, creating a more powerful system that later tracked over Japan.

== Preparations ==
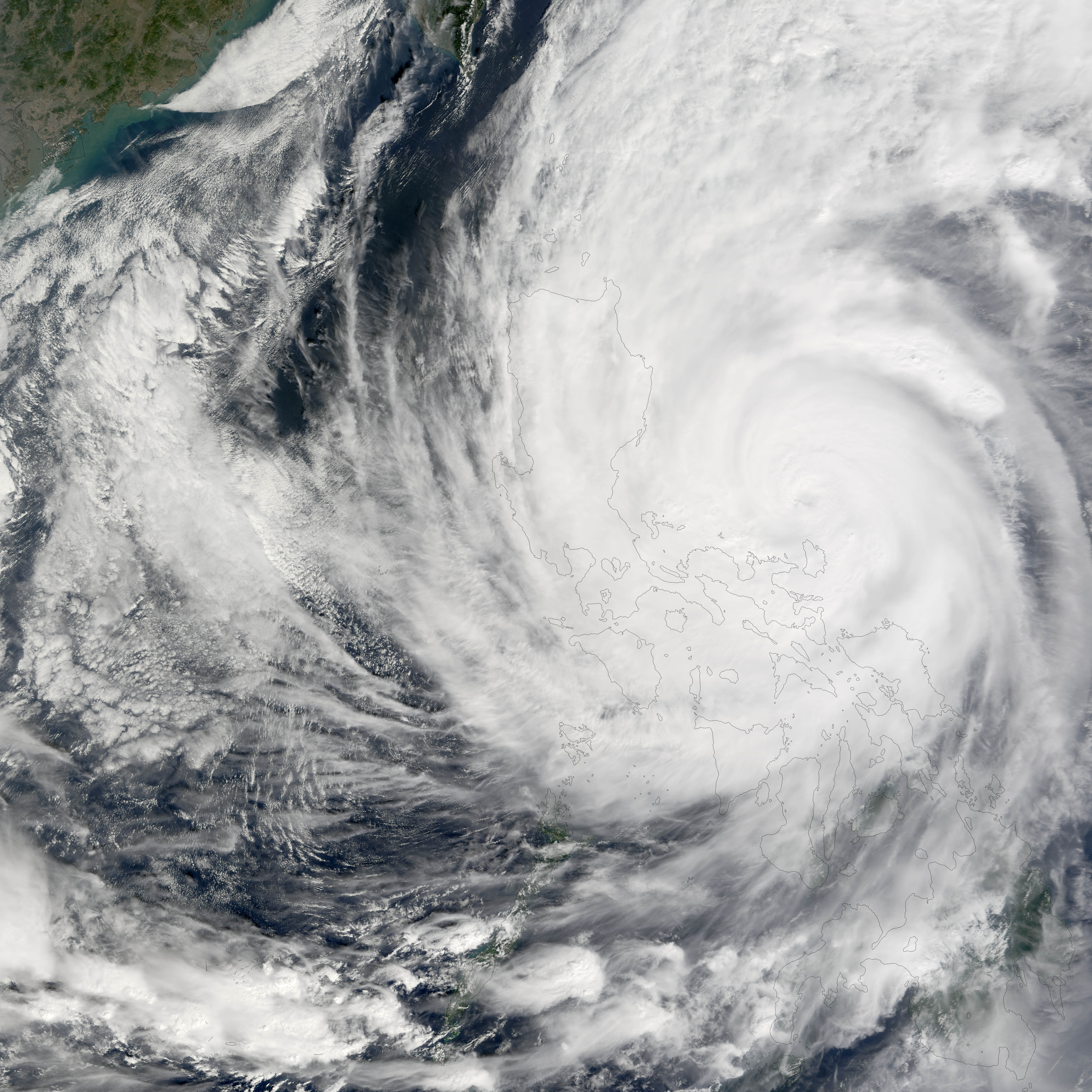
Typhoon Nanmadol approaching the Philippines on December 2

Initial forecasts following the formation of Nanmadol over open waters anticipated the typhoon to track directly into Luzon. On December 1, government sessions in Manila were temporarily suspended. Some commercial flights traversing to and from Luzon were cancelled in addition to ferry service between the eastern Bicol Region and Manila, stranding hundreds of passengers. Flight cancellations were primarily targeted at propeller aircraft as they were more susceptible to typhoon conditions. This impacted ongoing relief efforts, as the Philippine Air Force's fleet of rescue planes were also grounded. The impending storm also delayed the reopening of financial markets in Manila until December 3.

Animation of PSWS History throughout the passage of TY Yoyong (Nanmadol)

President Gloria Macapagal Arroyo ordered for precautionary measures to be undertaken by agencies under the purview of the National Disaster Coordinating Council (NDCC). In response, the German Foreign Office allocated €50,000 (US$67,000) to assist in preparations for Nanmadol. The Spanish Red Cross were forced to maintain relief supplies in the provinces of Aurora and Quezon in addition to managing ongoing relief efforts for regions impacted by Tropical Depression Winnie. Individual Red Cross chapters were tasked with closely monitoring the movement of relief stockpiles during these preparatory measures.

The NDCC also called for the evacuation of persons in potentially affected areas. Large-scale evacuations took place in Real, Quezon ahead of the approaching typhoon. According to the NDCC, 97,238 persons were evacuated in the lead-up to Nanmadol's Luzon landfall, with nearly 40,000 evacuating from the Bicol Region. However, the Office of Civil Defense documented the evacuation of approximately 168,000 civilians. Government shelters initially made to house displaced residents due to previous storms were adjusted to accommodate additional refugees evacuating due to the typhoon. In Catanduanes, 1,500 persons evacuated to these shelters. Other evacuees sought refuge in well-constructed buildings, as was the case in Mercedes, Eastern Samar, where 2,000 civilians stayed inside a school.

In Taiwan, the Central Weather Bureau issued a land warning for the island in advance of the typhoon. Potential impacts, which would likely be enhanced by the East Asian Monsoon, prompted Taiwanese president Chen Shui-bian to postpone political marches and campaign rallies intended for the upcoming presidential elections. In anticipation for the typhoon, schools and businesses in southern and eastern Taiwan were closed, along with the delaying of rail and air traffic. Kaohsiung International Airport was closed during the morning of December 4.

== Impact and aftermath ==
=== Philippines ===
Effects in the Philippines by region
Region	Fatalities	Injuries	Damage (USD)
Ilocos	0	3	$2.7 million
Cagayan Valley	14	35	$25 million
Central Luzon	9	24	$8.6 million
Calabarzon and Mimaropa	—N/a	—N/a	$710,000
Bicol	12	5	$490,000
Eastern Visayas	0	5	—N/a
Metro Manila	1	0	—N/a
Cordillera	6	5	$1.8 million
Totals:	70	77	$39.3 million
Because of differing sources, totals may not match.

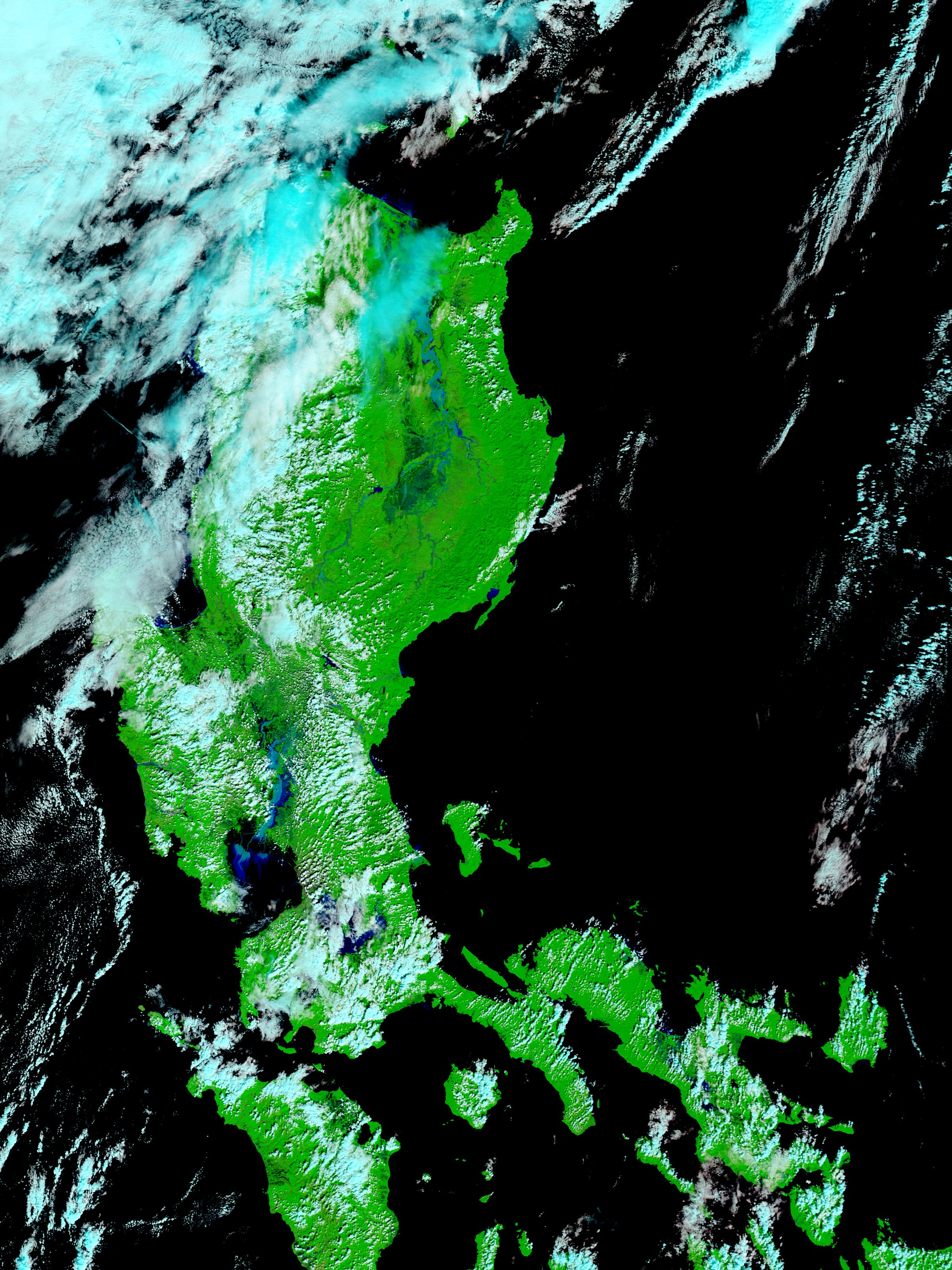
Satellite image showing flooding in the Philippines after Nanmadol on December 4

Damage assessments of Nanmadol's impacts in the Philippines found difficulty in distinguishing the storm's impacts from those of Typhoon Muifa, Tropical Storm Merbok, and Tropical Depression Winnie due to their rapid succession of effects. The NDCC, however, noted 70 fatalities as a result of Nanmadol alone, coupled with 157 injuries. The majority of deaths were associated with electrocutions or drownings. Approximately 160,000 people were displaced as well. Overall, the typhoon destroyed 10,457 households and damaged another 57,435. Damage was estimated at ₱2.23 billion (US$39.3 million). Precipitation peaked at 228 mm (9.0 in) in Daet, Camarines Norte, observed over a 24-hour period.

Even prior to the Philippine landfall of Nanmadol, ongoing relief operations were hampered by the storm's overreaching effects. Search and rescue helicopters failed to reach planned destinations, which was also due in part to the country's small helicopter fleet. A navy gunboat refitted as a relief ship headed for Real, Quezon was forced to turn back due to high waves onset by the approaching typhoon which swept potentially hazardous logs into sea.

The first Philippine provinces to be impacted by the typhoon were Albay and Catanduanes, which suffered power outages after strong winds tore down power lines. One person was killed in Virac, Catanduanes after being electrocuted by a felled power line. In order to prevent more widespread outages, electrical service in some locations was deliberately shut down. Landslides triggered by Nanmadol in Aurora killed 25 people. On the Bicol Peninsula, eight fatalities occurred due to drowning, electrocution, or hypothermia.

In the aftermath of the typhoon, the Philippine Red Cross made a full emergency appeal for funding to assist in recovery from Nanmadol and preceding storms. The Philippines government declared a state of calamity for fifteen provinces, cities, and municipalities. Medical personnel were deployed to mitigate potential outbreaks of disease and transport injured persons to hospitals. The NDCC distributed 14,065 sacks of rice worth roughly ₱11 million (US$200,000).

=== Elsewhere ===
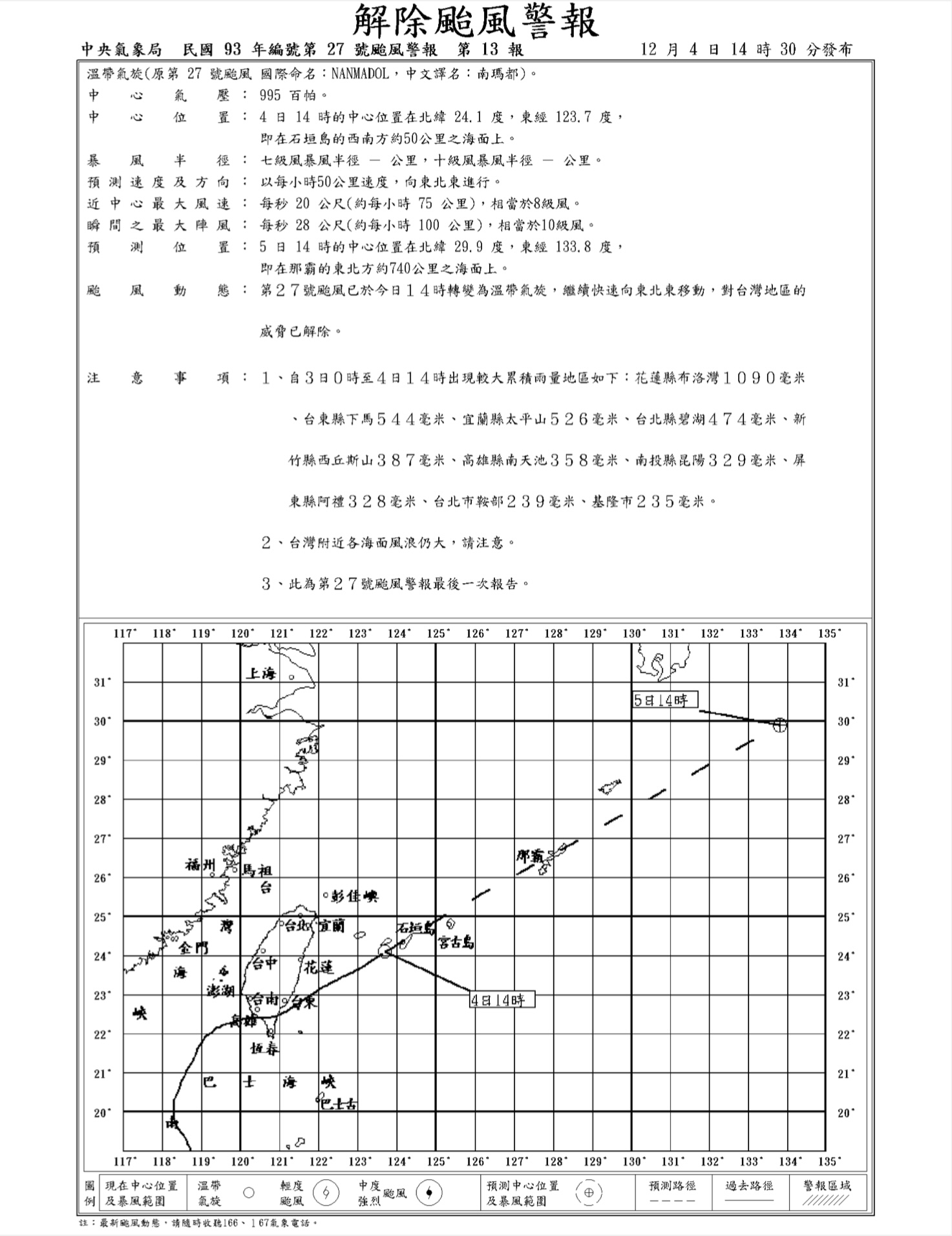
On 4 December 2004, the Nanmadol turned into an extratropical cyclone, and the Central Weather Bureau, Taiwan lifted the typhoon warning

Shortly before transitioning into an extratropical cyclone, Nanmadol made landfall in Fangliao, Taiwan as a tropical storm. This made Nanmadol the first recorded tropical cyclone to strike Taiwan in the month of December since records began in 1896. Heavy precipitation associated with the typhoon was reported, peaking at 1,090 mm (43 in) in Pulowan. The highest documented 24-hour rainfall total was at a station in Hualien County, which recorded 907 mm (35.7 in) in that timeframe. Power outages disrupted electrical supply to 26,588 households, and agricultural losses in Taiwan as a result of Nanmadol equated to NT$670 million (US$20.8 million). Two people were killed on the island. The typhoon's swath of rainfall also extended to East China, which was also climatologically abnormal. Rainfall in Fuzhou peaked at 52.3 mm (2.06 in), almost double the average for the month of December. In Zhejiang, rainfall peaked at 106 mm (4.2 in).

The extratropical remnants of Nanmadol brought record breaking rainfall and winds to Japan. A station in Shishikui, Tokushima received 269 mm (10.6 in) of rain, the highest amount documented in the country. Several other stations recorded rainfall totals in excess of 200 mm (7.9 in). Maximum sustained winds clocked at 88 km/h (55 mph) in Chiba, Chiba and Ojima, Tokyo, were the strongest ever recorded in December for those locations. The same station in Chiba clocked a wind gust at 176 km/h (109 mph), another record for the month of December and the highest reported wind gust in Japan from Nanmadol's remnants. A 145 km/h (90 mph) wind gust was recorded in Tokyo; this gust broke the record for the strongest gust recorded in the city since record-keeping began. Offshore Kagoshima Prefecture, a ferry capsized in rough waters, killing five. The captain of the ferry was later charged with professional negligence. In Aomori Prefecture, widespread power outages resulted from the strong winds. Heavy rains in Aichi Prefecture flooded several roads and damaged fisheries and agricultural land. One person was injured there, and damage totaled JP¥69.8 million (US$680,000).

== See also ==
- Other tropical cyclones named Nanmadol
- Weather of 2004
- Tropical cyclones in 2004
- List of Philippine typhoons (2000–present)
