= Tropical Storm Nanmadol (2017) =

Pacific severe tropical storm in 2017

Severe Tropical Storm Nanmadol (Emong)
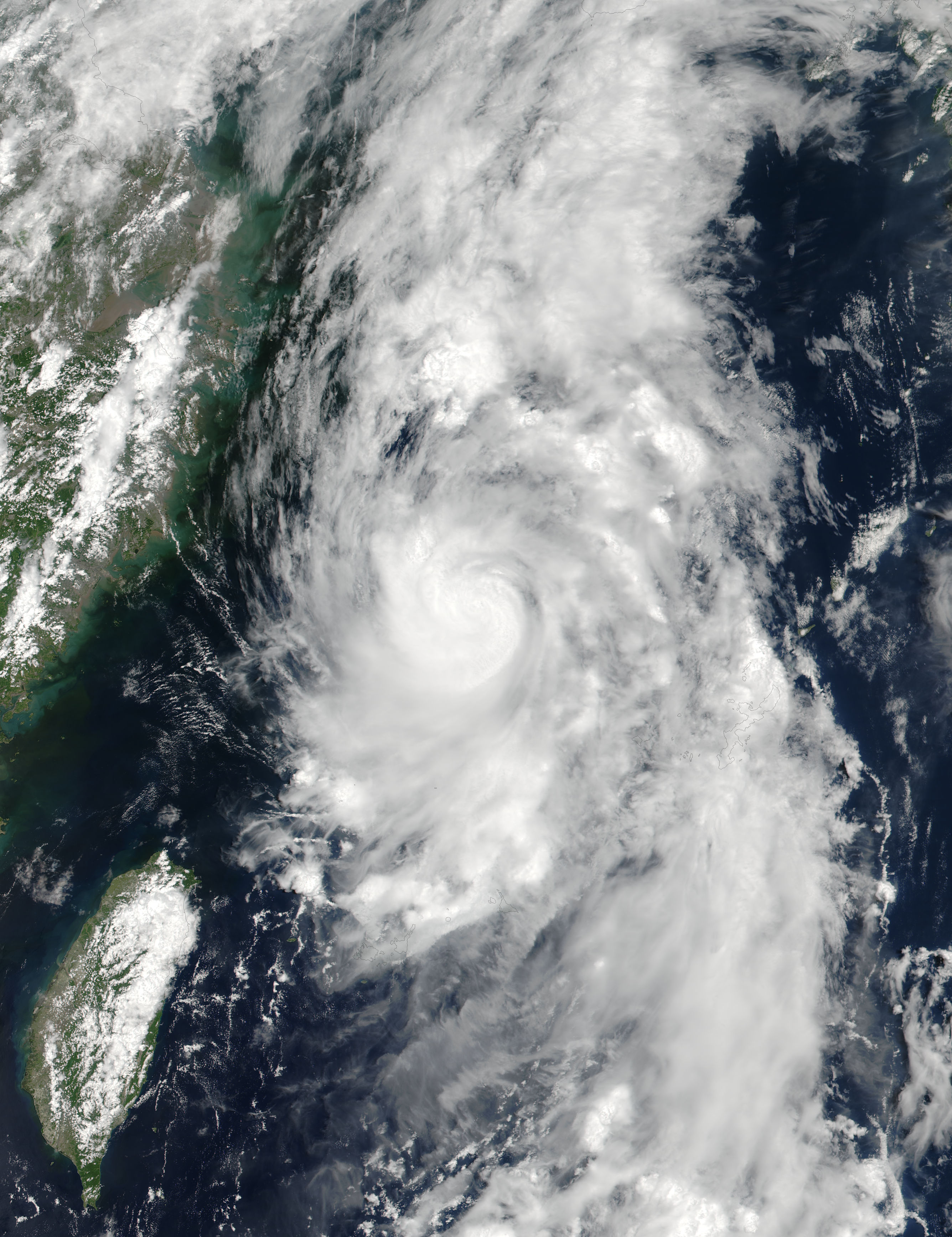
- Nanmadol near peak intensity on July 3

Meteorological history
- Formed: July 1, 2017
- Extratropical: July 4, 2017
- Dissipated: July 8, 2017

Severe tropical storm
- 10-minute sustained (JMA)
- Highest winds: 100 km/h (65 mph)
- Lowest pressure: 985 hPa (mbar); 29.09 inHg

Category 1-equivalent typhoon
- 1-minute sustained (SSHWS/JTWC)
- Highest winds: 120 km/h (75 mph)
- Lowest pressure: 974 hPa (mbar); 28.76 inHg

Overall effects
- Fatalities: 42 total
- Damage: $1.68 billion (2017 USD)
- Areas affected: Japan
- IBTrACS
- Part of the 2017 Pacific typhoon season

Severe Tropical Storm Nanmadol, (Note: The name Nanmadol (Pohnpeian: Nan Madol, [nɐn mɐtol]) was contributed by the Federated States of Micronesia and refers to Nan Madol, an archaelogical site in Pohnpeian.) known in the Philippines as Severe Tropical Storm Emong, was a tropical cyclone that impacted southern Japan in early July 2017. The third named storm of the annual typhoon season, Nanmadol developed over in the Philippine Sea as a tropical depression on July 1 before strengthening into a tropical storm on July 3. After gaining organization, the system rapidly developed and intensified into a severe tropical storm and reached its peak intensity with 10-minute maximum sustained winds of 100 km/h (60 mph) and a minimum barometric pressure of 985 hPa (29.1 inHg). On July 4, Nanmadol turned eastward and made landfall near Nagasaki, Kyushu, just before it transitioned into an extratropical cyclone.

Nanmadol dropped torrential rainfall across Kyushu, resulting in landslides, although the Fukuoka and Ōita Prefectures were the hardest hit. The city of Asakura, Fukuoka experienced a one-day rainfall surpassing the city's average total for July by 50%, with a rainfall of 500 mm (20 in) recorded within a 12-hour period on July 5. Landslides were recorded in 44 different locations and flooding in 38 locations, and from this, more than 2,600 homes were destroyed. In total, 42 people died from Nanmadol due to drowning from flash flooding or due to landslides. Total damages was estimated at ¥190 billion (US$1.68 billion).

== Meteorological history ==
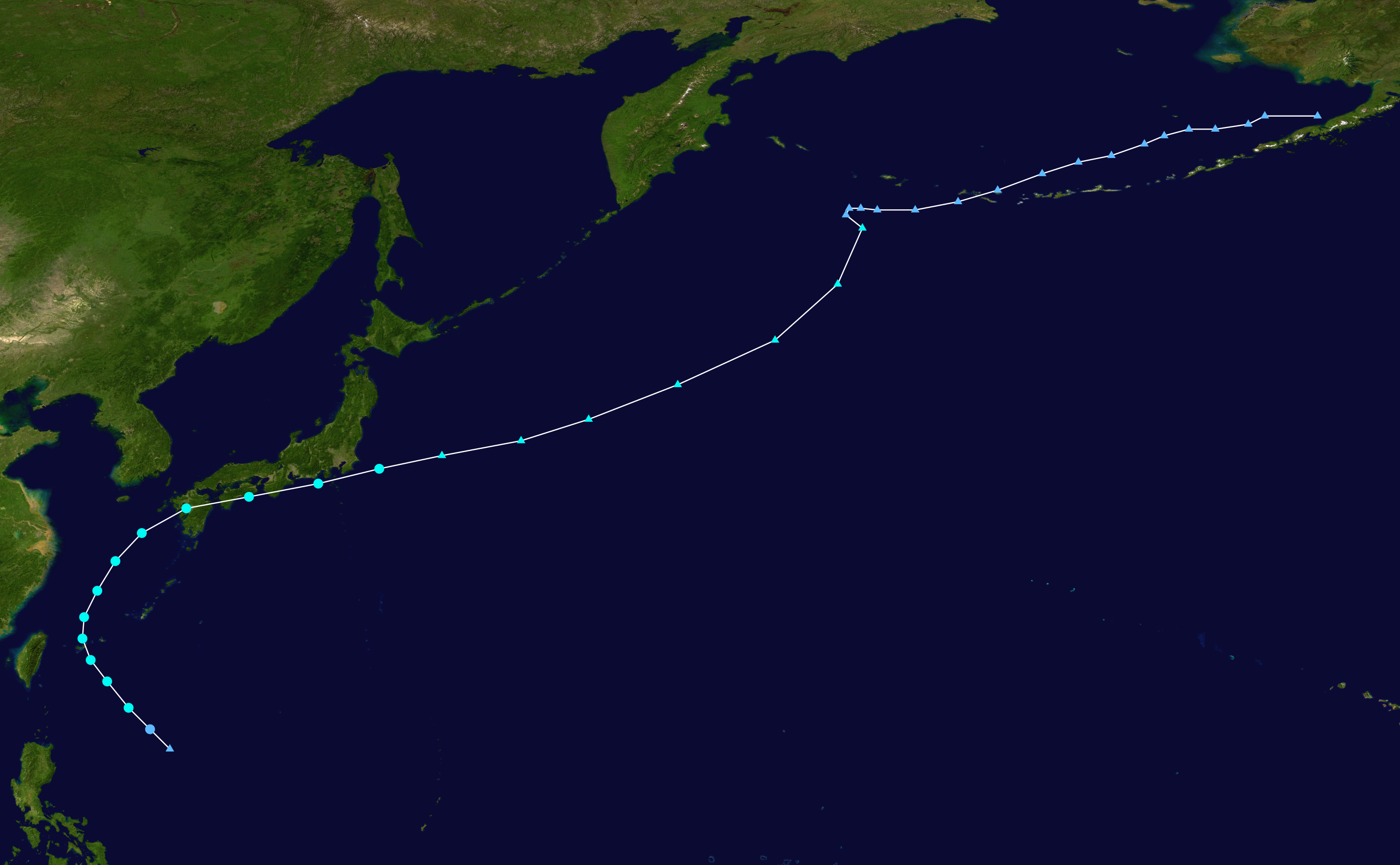
Map plotting the storm's track and intensity, according to the Saffir–Simpson scale (Note: The position of Nanmadol's Category 1 peak is not depicted in this graphic as it is an asynoptic point (i.e. not at the 3-hour intervals of all other points) occurring at 17:00 UTC July 3.) Map key Saffir–Simpson scale Tropical depression (≤38 mph, ≤62 km/h) Tropical storm (39–73 mph, 63–118 km/h) Category 1 (74–95 mph, 119–153 km/h) Category 2 (96–110 mph, 154–177 km/h) Category 3 (111–129 mph, 178–208 km/h) Category 4 (130–156 mph, 209–251 km/h) Category 5 (≥157 mph, ≥252 km/h) Unknown Storm type Tropical cyclone Subtropical cyclone Extratropical cyclone, remnant low, tropical disturbance, or monsoon depression

During June 30, a tropical disturbance developed about 463 km (288 mi) to the north-northeast of Palau. Noting some organization within the system, the Joint Typhoon Warning Center (JTWC) issued a Tropical Cyclone Formation Alert (TCFA) early on July 1. Six hours later, the Japan Meteorological Agency (JMA) classified it as a tropical depression. Later that day, the JMA began to issue advisories, predicting that the system could intensify into a tropical storm within the next 24 hours. Shortly after, the Philippine Atmospheric, Geophysical and Astronomical Services Administration (PAGASA) upgraded the system to a tropical depression, assigning the local name Emong.

Early on July 2, the JMA upgraded the system to a tropical storm, and assigned the official name Nanmadol. The PAGASA also upgraded the system to a tropical storm. Soon after, the JTWC gave the system the internal designation of 05W. Satellite imagery depicted convective banding wrapping tightly into Nanmadol's low-level circulation center (LLCC), prompting the JTWC to upgrade it to a tropical storm in their next advisory. Nanmadol later entered a favorable environment with low vertical wind shear and high sea surface temperatures (SSTs) of 30–31 °C (86–88 °F), allowing it to develop a deep and symmetric core surrounded by deep convection. At this time, the JMA stated that Nanmadol had intensified into a severe tropical storm. The PAGASA also upgraded Nanmadol to a severe tropical storm in their final advisory on the system as it exited the Philippine Area of Responsibility.

Nanmadol continued to intensify while moving northward just to the east of Taiwan, with satellite imagery capturing a small, developing eye. At 06:00 UTC on July 3, Nanmadol reached its peak intensity with the JTWC assessing the cyclone to have 1-minute sustained winds of 110 km/h (68 mph); the JMA estimated 10-minute sustained winds of 100 km/h (62 mph) and a minimum barometric pressure of 985 hPa (29.09 inHg). However, the JTWC assessed that Nanmadol reached its peak intensity as a Category 1-equivalent typhoon with one-minute sustained winds of 120 km/h (75 mph) six hours later in a post-analysis report. Nanmadol maintained its peak intensity for several hours until July 4, when the system began curving eastward and its satellite presentation deteriorated. Around that time, Nanmadol made landfall approximately 40 km (25 mi) to the east of Nagasaki in Kyushu. Despite the system still displaying a well-defined center, cloud tops began to warm, in line with the rapid weakening trend of the system. After several hours, Nanmadol began to interact with the mid-latitude westerlies; the JTWC downgraded the system further to a low-end of tropical storm intensity, though the JMA still maintained it at severe tropical storm intensity. By 21:00 UTC on the same day, the JTWC issued its final advisory on Nanmadol, mentioning that the system was embedded within the cold baroclinic zone, and had thus lost its tropical characteristics and transitioned into a cold-core low. The JMA soon followed suit with their final warning, declaring that Nanmadol had fully become an extratropical cyclone at 00:00 UTC on July 5. Its extratropical remnants later left the basin on July 8.

== Preparations, impact, and aftermath ==
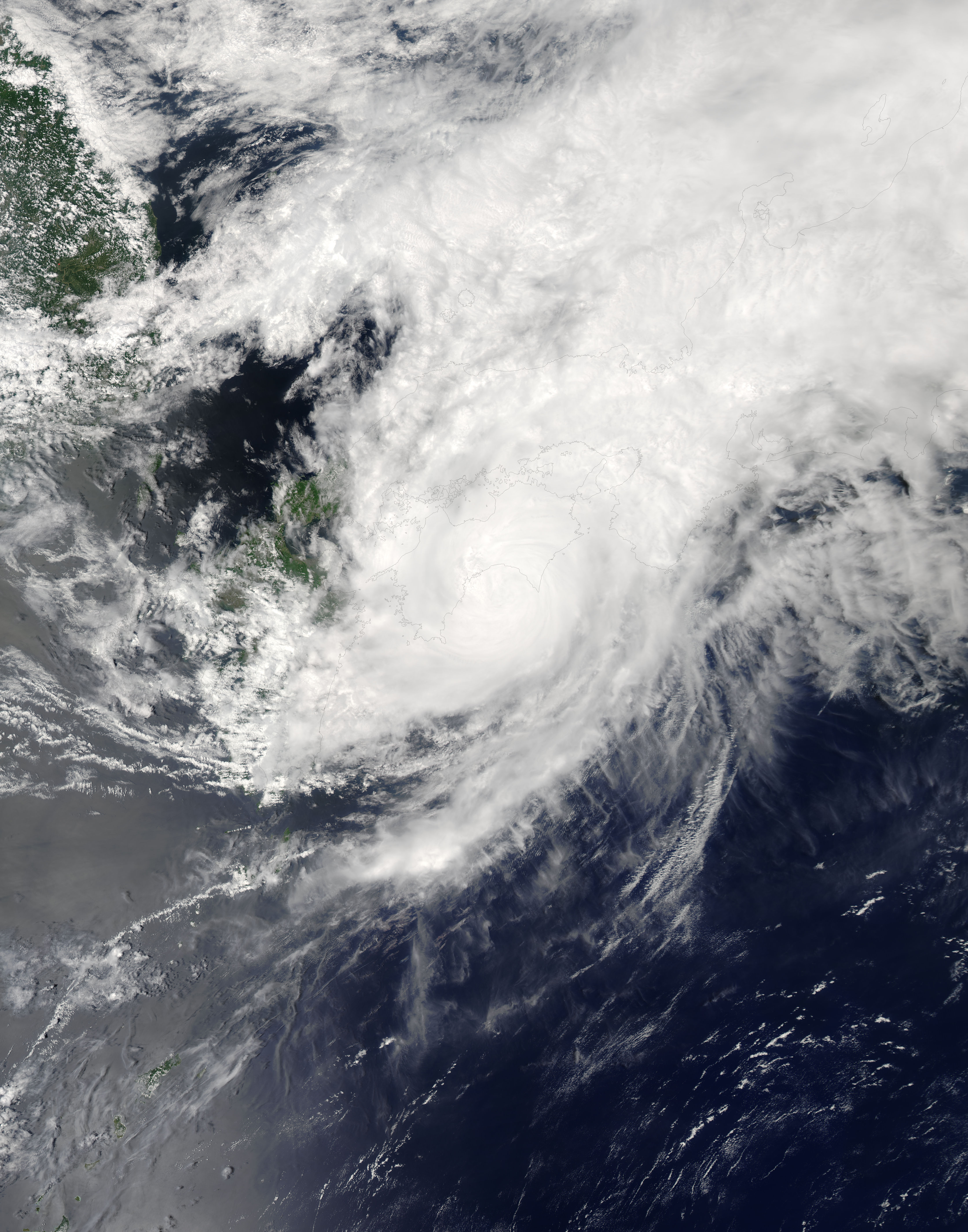
Nanmadol affecting southern Japan on July 4

The JMA issued a heavy rain warning for Shimane Prefecture and neighboring areas, in which the government had urged 20,000 residents to evacuate. On July 3, the Sasebo City Emergency Management Bureau activated a total of 30 emergency shelters. The government dispatched a total of 12,000 rescuers, including police officers, firefighters and the Self-Defense Forces troops, in preparation for post-storm relief. On July 10, the Kyushu Railway Company began a bus service to aid residents trapped in some areas along the currently suspended Kyudai Main Line; this included areas between Ukiha Station in Fukuoka Prefecture and Hita Station, Ōita Prefecture, where an iron bridge spanning a river was washed away by floodwaters. Due to the threat of further landslides, the West Nippon Expressway Company extended a closure of the Ōita Expressway. Trees with trunks of 50–60 cm (19.5–23.5 in) were washed away, blocking the water stream further and exacerbating floods. Therefore, on July 11, Forestry Minister Yuji Yamamoto pledged to set up a task force to remove driftwood. Meanwhile, an official at the University of Hyogo warned other municipalities of potential damage caused by fallen trees.

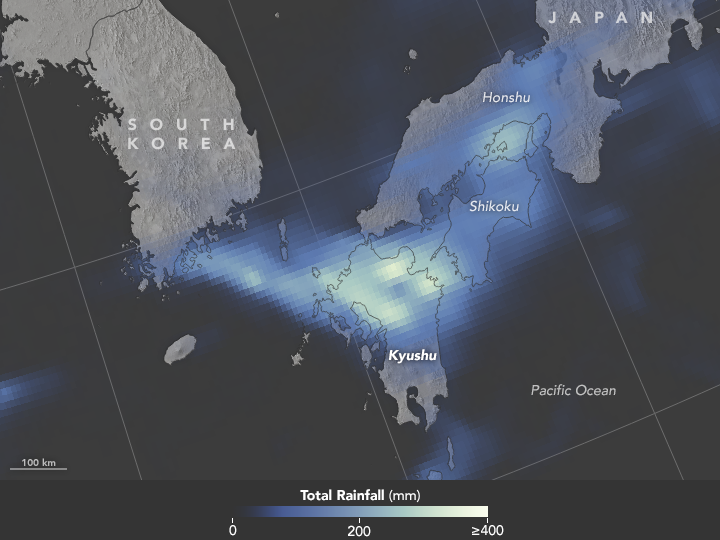
Map of satellite-estimated rains across Japan after the passage of Nanmadol

Peak windspeeds of 150 km/h (93 mph) were recorded in Nagasaki upon landfall, including a 162 km/h (101 mph) wind gust in the Shikoku town of Muroto just after 05:30 UTC. Strong winds overturned vehicles, collapsed scaffolding, and left 68,500 homes without power in Nagasaki and Kumamoto prefectures; other blackouts occurred in the prefectures of Ōita, Miyazaki and Kagoshima. Around 3,000 airline passengers were affected by the grounding and cancellation of at least 47 flights. Heavy rains and strong winds disrupted numerous train services including the iconic Shinkansen, between Hakata and Kagoshima-Chuo in Kyushu. Evacuation advisories were issued to at least 20,000 residents due to fears of possible flooding and landslides, especially in the Niigata, Toyama and Nagano prefectures that had experienced rainfall accumulations of up to 300 mm (12 in) in the preceding hours. In Hamada, Shimane, over 80 mm (3.1 in) fell in an hour.

At least three people were injured during the storm—a young boy's hand was injured when a school window broke in the city of Kumamoto, and two adults in Ōita prefecture sustained injuries from falls as a result of the strong winds. About 180 people took shelter at a junior high school gymnasium in Asakura. Within the prefecture, 130 mm (5.1 in) of rain fell in an hour, greatly contributing to a 24-hour rainfall total of 545 mm (21.5 in). A later report showed that the prefecture experienced a total accumulated rainfall of 632.5 mm (24.90 in). The city of Hita, Ōita also experienced extreme rainfall, with accumulations of 400 mm (16 in). However the prefecture of Fukuoka experienced an incredible amount of 774 mm (30.5 in) of rain within the course of nine hours on July 5. Due to the risk of landslides, an evacuation order which covered 316 people from 115 households was issued in the Haki District of Asakura, due to high risk of landslides. Throughout the Fukuoka and Ōita Prefectures, 1,724 people evacuated. More than 2,600 homes were destroyed by Nanmadol around the Fukuoka, Oita, and the Hiroshima prefectures, but a later report showed a total of 4,458 buildings damaged. Nearly a week after the flooding had begun, some roads were already reopened over in some communities in the Fukuoka Prefecture. During July 12, the Japanese prime minister Shinzō Abe canceled a trip to Estonia for a European tour and instead visited devastated places over in the Kyushu region to view the damage and console residents. He also stated that the government would take all possible measures to assist with reconstruction efforts.

A total of 42 people have been confirmed dead due to torrential rains which caused landslides and flooding, particularly in Kyushu, where two still remained missing and leaving 39 people injured. Total damages in Japan were amounted to be ¥190 billion (US$1.68 billion).

== See also ==
- Weather of 2017
- Tropical cyclones in 2017
- Other tropical cyclones named Nanmadol
- Other tropical cyclones named Emong
- Tropical Storm Etau (2009)
- Typhoon Neoguri (2014)
- Tropical Storm Etau (2015)
- Typhoon Chaba (2016)
- Typhoon Talim (2017)
