= Mallig Plains =

Mallig Plains Region
- Economic alliance
- Location (shaded area) of Mallig Plains in Isabela.
- Country: Philippines
- Region: Region II
- Island: Luzon
- Province: Isabela
- Municipalities: Roxas; Mallig; Quezon; Aurora; Burgos; Quirino; San Manuel
- Legislative Districts: 5th District of Isabela

Government
  - Type: Economic Alliance

Area
  - Total: 1,199 km^{2} (463 sq mi)

Population (August 1, 2015)
  - Total: 233,290
- Time zone: UTC+8 (Philippine Standard Time)

Mallig Plains Region is a region in the western part of the province of Isabela in the Philippines. Its name was acquired from the rolling terrains in western Isabela. The municipality of Roxas serves as the region's business hub.

== Component local government units ==
Mallig Plains Region is not an administrative political unit but an agglomeration of independent local government units (LGUs), the third level government in the Philippine political system.

Municipality	Population (2015)	Area	Income Classification
Roxas	61,773	184.80	1st Class
Mallig	30,459	133.40	4th Class
Quirino	24,501	126.20	4th Class
Quezon	25,860	268.26	4th Class
Burgos	23,784	73.10	5th Class
Aurora	35,017	300.56	3rd Class
San Manuel	31,896	112.77	4th Class
Mallig Plains	233,290	1,199 km^{2}	-

Based on data from the 2015 census

== History ==
In 1929, the late President Manuel L. Quezon declared the westernmost part of Isabela as a resettlement area, historically known as the Mallig Plains Resettlement Area. The area was named after the Mallig River that traverses it. It includes the municipalities of Gamu, Quezon and some parts of past day Tumauini and Ilagan City. Quezon have long been seats of rich and colorful historical events that influenced the lives of the people of Isabela since its creation on May 1, 1856 through a Royal Decree issued in honor of Queen Isabella II of Spain (reigned 1843 to 1868). A Barrio Dalig of Gamu was created as an independent municipality named Aurora on 1927 and is referred as the Gateway to Mallig Plains. On 1948 President Elpidio Quirino signed Executive Order 136 creating the "Barrio Vira" of Gamu as an independent municipality named Roxas. In 1957, some baranggays of Roxas were separated to form the newly created municipality of Callang (now San Manuel).

From then on, the influx of settlers from the Central Luzon and the Ilocos Region encouraged more other settlers to migrate westward in these Kalinga-dominated plains.

On 1970s, the municipality of Mallig serves as the most progressive among the municipalities of Mallig Plains. But on 1980s, the municipality of Aurora overcame Mallig and became the business center. However, on 1990s to present, Roxas officially overcame the two municipalities and is now the business center of the Mallig Plains.

== Geographical location ==
The Mallig Plains Region is composed of 1,199 km^{2} with a total population of 205, 813 with Roxas as the most populated and the only 1st class municipality among seven. It is a lowland area with rolling terrain and kilometers of straight National Highway. The region is bordered by Paracelis, Mountain Province and Tabuk on the west, Cabagan and Santo Tomas, Isabela on the north, Tumauini, Delfin Albano and Gamu, Isabela on the east, and Cabatuan, San Mateo and Reina Mercedes, Isabela on the south.

== Government ==
Mallig Plains is a geographical region and does not have a government that directly administers it, with each municipality still retaining their own independent governance.
