= Roxas, Isabela =

Municipality in Isabela, Philippines

Roxas
- Municipality
- Municipality of Roxas
- Pres. Manuel A. Roxas Monument Roxas Municipal Hall Our Lady of La Salette Parish Church Don Mariano Marcos Avenue Pres. Manuel A. Roxas Memorial Museum & Library

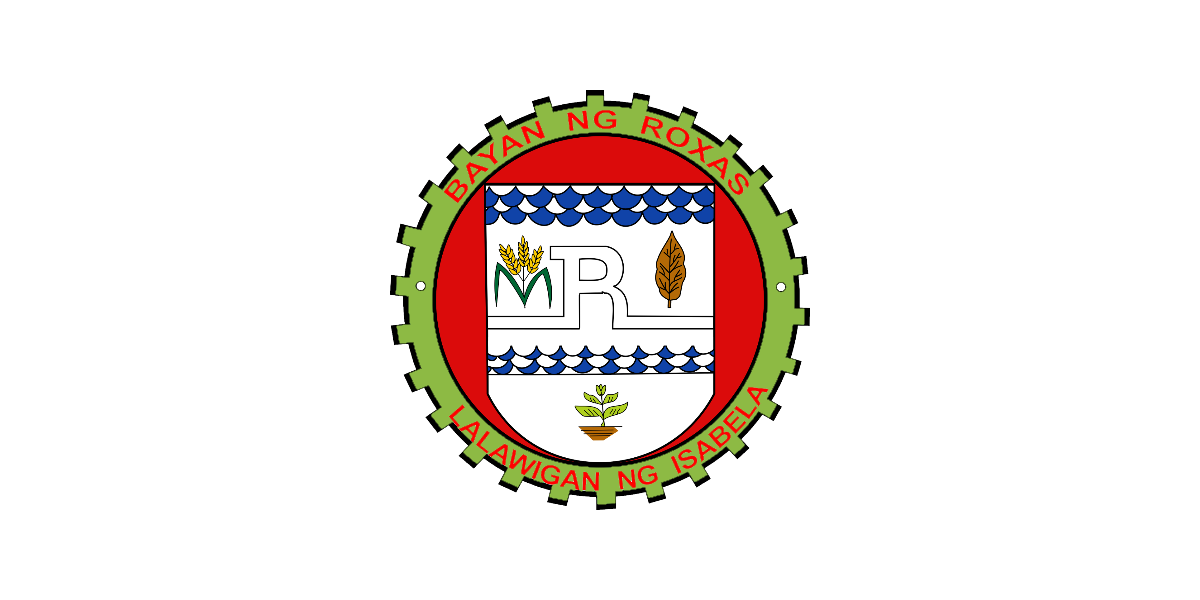
- Flag Seal
- Nickname: Commercial Center of the Mallig Plains Region
- Motto: Roxas
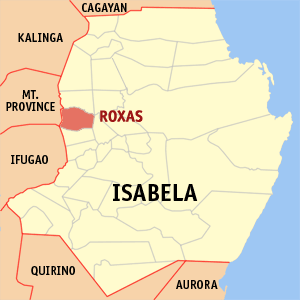
- Map of Isabela with Roxas highlighted

- Location within the Philippines
- Coordinates: 17°07′N 121°37′E
- Country: Philippines
- Region: Cagayan Valley
- Province: Isabela
- District: 5th district
- Founded: July 4, 1948
- Named for: Manuel Roxas
- Barangays: 26 (see Barangays)

Government
  - Type: Sangguniang Bayan
  - Mayor: Benidict C. Calderon
  - Vice Mayor: Susana U. Magno
  - Representative: Faustino Michael Carlos T. Dy III
  - Electorate: 41,442 voters (2025)

Area
  - Total: 184.80 km^{2} (71.35 sq mi)
- Elevation: 61 m (200 ft)
- Highest elevation: 97 m (318 ft)
- Lowest elevation: 45 m (148 ft)

Population (2024 census)
  - Total: 66,593
  - Density: 360.35/km^{2} (933.31/sq mi)
  - Households: 16,094

Economy
  - Income class: 1st municipal income class
  - Poverty incidence: 11.74% (2023)
  - Revenue: ₱ 649.2 million (2024)
  - Assets: ₱ 1,318 million (2024)
  - Expenditure: ₱ 363.5 million (2024)
  - Liabilities: ₱ 293.3 million (2024)

Service provider
  - Electricity: Isabela 2 Electric Cooperative (ISELCO 2)
- Time zone: UTC+8 (PST)
- ZIP code: 3320
- PSGC: 0203126000
- IDD : area code: +63 (0)78
- Native languages: Ibanag; Ilocano; Tagalog
- Website: roxasisabela.gov.ph

Roxas, officially the Municipality of Roxas (Ilocano: Ili ti Roxas; Tagalog: Bayan ng Roxas), is a municipality in the province of Isabela, Philippines. According to the 2024 census, it has a population of 66,593 people.

The municipality is the center of business and commerce in the Mallig Plains Region. In 1839, two new provinces were created by the Spanish conquistadors, dividing the La Provincia del Valle de Cagayan into two. One retained the name Cagayan, while a new province of Nueva Vizcaya was created. Bindang was dissolved as Barrio Vira under the Municipality of Gamu, Isabela.

== Etymology ==
The place used to be called Bindang (Bayani), and was part of La Provincia del Valle de Cagayan (the present-day area of Cagayan to Nueva Vizcaya). On July 1, 1948, President Elpidio Quirino issued Executive Order 136, which established Barrio Vira as an independent municipality named Roxas in honor of his predecessor, Manuel Roxas.

== History ==
Early settlers were the Kalingas who originated from adjacent places in Mountain Province and parts of Kalinga. Despite occasional clashes with Kalingas, Ilocano people settled in the area, and increased their number with an influx from Ilocanos from Central Plains of Luzon and Ilocos.

In 1839, two new provinces were created by the Spanish conquistadors dividing the La Provincia del Valle de Cagayan into two. One retained the name Cagayan, while a new province of Nueva Vizcaya was created. Bindang was dissolved as Barrio Vira under the municipality of Gamu, Isabela.

In 1938, the Mallig Plains was set aside by the National Land Settlement Administration (NLSA) under Settlement No. 2 due to the construction of another National Highway project of President Manuel L. Quezon that passed through the area. But World War II interrupted the implementation of the highway, leaving it uncemented for many years. After the war, provincial leaders saw the potential of Barrio Vira as an independent town.

On July 1, 1948, President Elpidio Quirino established Executive Order 136 creating Barrio Vira as an independent municipality named "Roxas" to honor his predecessor Manuel A. Roxas who just died a few months back. It was then inaugurated on July 4, 1948, and Rafael Lintao became its first mayor.

In 1952, the barrios of Holy Friday, San Jose (East), and San Jose (West) were transferred to the newly created town of Mallig. In 1957, the barrios of Callang, Eden, Babanuang, Cabaritan, Santa Cruz, Malalinta, Mararigue, Calaocan, and Caraniogan were separated to form the municipality of Callang, now San Manuel. In the same year, the barrio of Basilio was renamed to San Jose.

== Geography ==
Roxas is one of the 34 municipalities comprising the wide province of Isabela. It is exactly located on the central-western part of the province, bounded in the north by Mallig, on the north-east by Quirino, on the east by Burgos, on the south by San Manuel, and on the west by Paracelis in Mountain Province.

The road traversing Roxas is the Maharlika Highway or better known as Cagayan Valley Road, connecting to other towns in Isabela particularly the adjacent towns of Gamu, Quirino, Mallig, and San Manuel. Roxas lie on a flat fertile land between the two valleys of Cagayan. It occupies an area of 184.80 square kilometres (71.35 sq mi) or 2.01% of the total land area of Isabela. The town is partly urban, and partly rural. The urban area is expanding rapidly throughout the years making it a future city. The rural part of the town compose mainly of rice fields.

Roxas is situated 38.80 kilometres (24.11 mi) from the provincial capital Ilagan, 415.53 kilometres (258.20 mi) from the country's capital city of Manila.

Google map coordinates (17°07'19.2"N 121°36'17.7"E)

=== Barangays ===
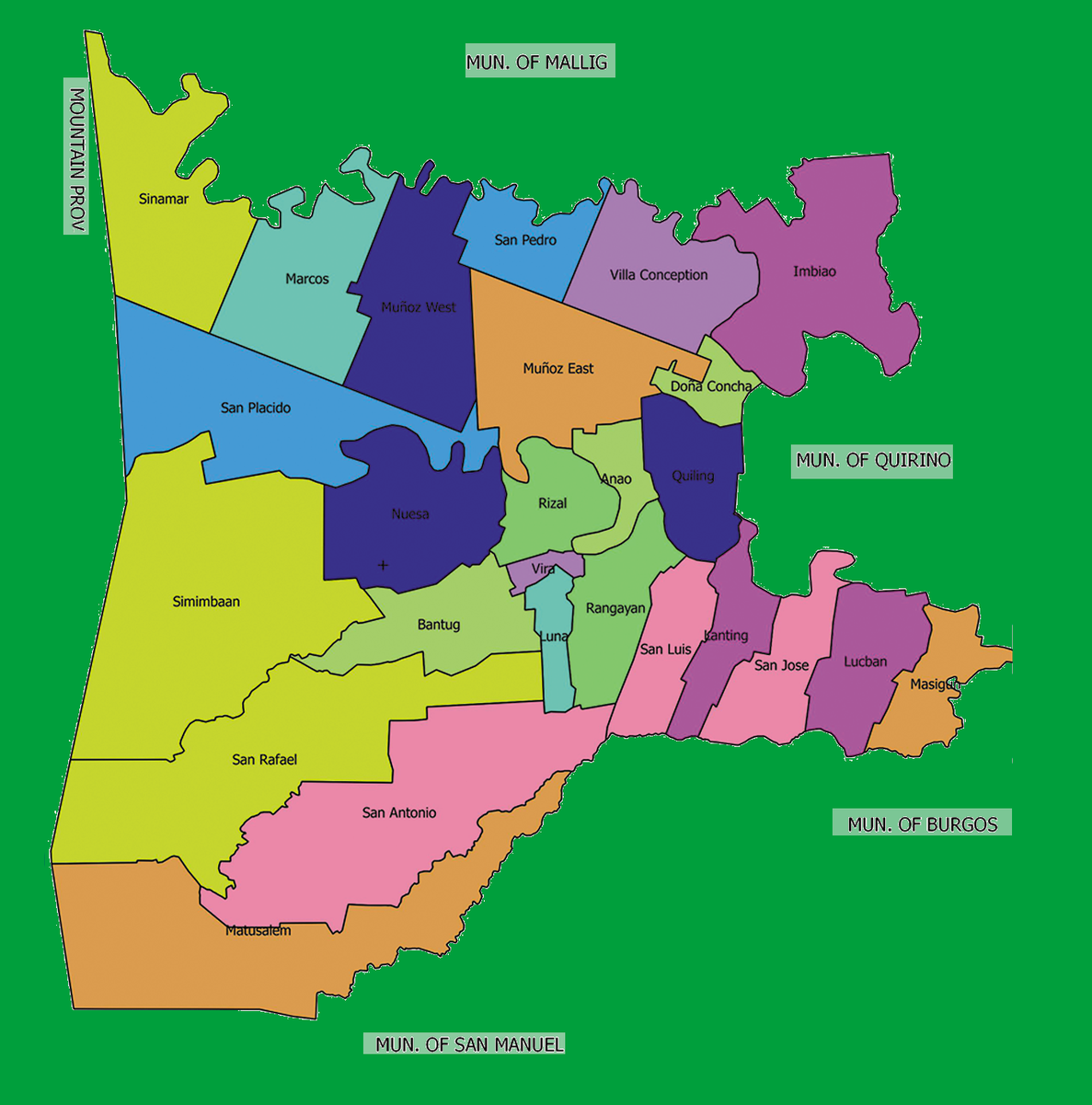
Barangays of Roxas, Isabela

Roxas is politically subdivided into 26 barangays. Each barangay consists of puroks while some have sitios.

Barangay	PSGC	Urban/Rural
Anao	23126001	Rural
Bantug (Poblacion)	23126013	Urban
Doña Concha	23126031	Rural
Imbiao	23126004	Rural
Lanting	23126005	Rural
Lucban	23126006	Rural
Luna (Poblacion)	23126014	Urban
Marcos	23126007	Rural
Masigun	23126008	Rural
Matusalem	23126028	Rural
Muñoz East	23126029	Rural
Muñoz West	23126030	Rural
Quiling	23126015	Rural
Rang-ayan	23126016	Rural
Rizal (Poblacion)	23126011	Urban
San Antonio	23126017	Rural
San Jose	23126018	Rural
San Luis	23126032	Rural
San Pedro	23126019	Rural
San Placido	23126020	Rural
San Rafael	23126021	Rural
Simimbaan	23126023	Rural
Sinamar	23126024	Rural
Sotero Nuesa	23126025	Urban
Villa Concepcion	23126026	Rural
Vira (Poblacion)	23126012	Urban

=== Topography ===
The landscape of Roxas is relatively compose of flatlands with minimal rise at certain point with base mountain elevations on the eastern part, on the parts of Sinamar, Simimbaan and San Placido. It is approximately 90% of the land area comprising the town can be described as low-lying hills with rolling terrain and an elevation of 200 feet or 61 meters above sea level. The town is dissected by creeks, river and waterways acting as natural drainage from waters coming from the uplands. The Siffu River, a connection from Ilog ng Cagayan(Cagayan River) traverse west ward from its diversion from Paracelis to Tuguegarao City supplying the rice fields with irrigation.

The center of the town is relatively low relief of flatlands, while the south-western and north-western part having moderately sloping areas comprising the foothills of Mountain Province.

=== Climate ===
Climate data for Roxas, Isabela
Month	Jan	Feb	Mar	Apr	May	Jun	Jul	Aug	Sep	Oct	Nov	Dec	Year
Mean daily maximum °C (°F)	29 (84)	30 (86)	32 (90)	35 (95)	35 (95)	35 (95)	34 (93)	33 (91)	32 (90)	31 (88)	30 (86)	28 (82)	32 (90)
Mean daily minimum °C (°F)	19 (66)	20 (68)	21 (70)	23 (73)	23 (73)	24 (75)	23 (73)	23 (73)	23 (73)	22 (72)	21 (70)	20 (68)	22 (71)
Average precipitation mm (inches)	31.2 (1.23)	23 (0.9)	27.7 (1.09)	28.1 (1.11)	113.5 (4.47)	141.4 (5.57)	176.4 (6.94)	236.6 (9.31)	224.9 (8.85)	247.7 (9.75)	222.9 (8.78)	178 (7.0)	1,651.4 (65)
Average rainy days	10	6	5	5	13	12	15	15	15	17	16	15	144
Source: World Weather Online

Using the corona classification scheme, the Philippine Atmospheric, Geophysical and Astronomical Services Administration (PAGASA) classified Roxas' climatic type as to Type III category. Type III Climate is characterized by no pronounced seasons, but often drier from November to April and wet season from May to October like any other parts of the country. Roxas is described as Cloudy especially during summer time with an average wind of 1 mph to 3 mph.

The temperature of Roxas is very rare to change but it varies minimally with an average temperature ranging from 23.4 °C to 23.9 °C. The hottest months of the year are April and May with an average of 27 °C. Weather extremes vary from 16 °C nights during January and 38 °C during the hot, dry season. People can describe the temperature as hot weather, due to its close proximity to the hottest points of the Philippines, like Quezon in Isabela and Tuguegarao City in Cagayan. The data was gathered using weather station RPLC, 310 feet (94 m) above Roxas, Isabela.

== Demographics ==
Population census of Roxas
Year	Pop.	±% p.a.
1948	14,864	—
1960	17,959	+1.59%
1970	22,997	+2.50%
1975	28,696	+4.54%
1980	33,045	+2.86%
1990	40,230	+1.99%
1995	45,187	+2.20%
2000	48,929	+1.72%
2007	53,461	+1.23%
2010	57,699	+2.82%
2015	61,773	+1.31%
2020	65,839	+1.35%
2024	66,593	+0.27%
Source: Philippine Statistics Authority

In the 2024 census, the population of Roxas was 66,593 people, with a density of 360 inhabitants per square kilometre or 930 inhabitants per square mile.

== Economy ==
Poverty incidence of Roxas (%)

Source: Philippine Statistics Authority

=== Agriculture ===
Rice field in Barangay San Rafael, depicts the municipalities agricultural abundance.

The existence of the National Irrigation Administration (NIA) System in the municipality that provides water supply services in irrigating farmlands makes the locality a prime agricultural community. The presence of these services makes the agricultural workers the highest in number. The agricultural productivity of Roxas is high, reaching as much as 95 percent cultivation rates in rice and corn. Surplus production of rice and corn are being exported to other places. Other crops are vegetables, tobacco and root crops in which production is just sufficient for local consumption. Likewise, the production of meat including pork and poultry is just sufficient but the supply of fish of other kinds aside from the harvest of inland fishpond owners within the locality is dependent on the arrival of supply coming from other places.

In the area, rice is the predominant crop, planted twice a year. The livelihood opportunity is very limited thus, a year-round planting of vegetables is practiced to sustain additional income for the settlers. Farm labor is highly utilized and low productivity was experienced because of manual farming. As such, during peak of drying, farmers are compelled to sell their produce freshly threshed which commands lower price. In 2009, the government provided P3 million financial assistance for the Mestizo 1 hybrid seeds planting and for the establishment of needed agricultural components for Farming improvements. With the Local Government Unit's strong support, cooperative members embarked on hybrid rice production starting as early as 2007-2008 wet season cropping and followed through the next dry season using 40-percent organic fertilizer.

Roxas municipality prides itself as the "pioneer" in hybrid rice production in the province of Isabela with the farmers now producing their own M1 hybrid seeds. The farmers who belong to three irrigators associations in barangays Simimbaan, Casilbagan and Tanap Progreso, have organized themselves into a cooperative called Simca Model Cluster MPC under the auspices of the Department of Agriculture. The rice cluster operation is an extension strategy in reaching farmers and extending assistance to achieve increased productivity, food sufficiency and job generation. This is initiated in support to the Ginintuang Masaganang Ani (GMA) Rice Program of then President Gloria Macapagal Arroyo.

Aside from hybrid rice enterprise, they also venture on fishery. Through the Bureau of Fishery and Aquatic Resources (BFAR), the cluster coop had dispersed fingerlings to initial 23 fishery cooperators who have backyard fishpond and rice-fish integrated farming.

=== Trades and business ===
Roxas Public Market

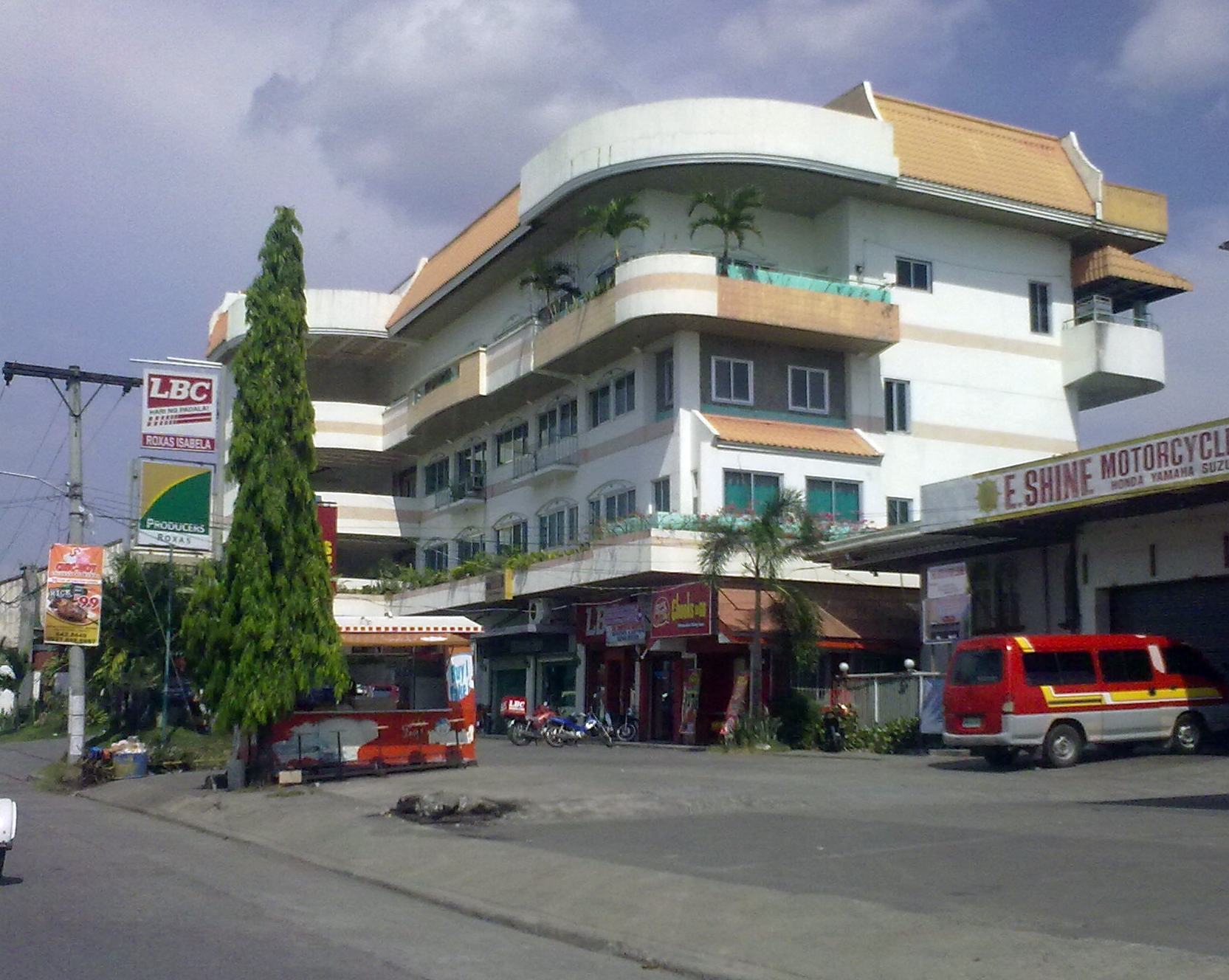
Bethany Garden Hotel

Since 2007, Roxas is notable for being most progressive town in Mallig Plains Region.

Roxas has the largest market in the Mallig Plains Region due to its continuous expansion after its 1987 construction. The market place is an organized area by which dry goods, wet market, toy stores and commercial stores are separated from each other. It offers a variety of products that is enough to provide the needs of the residents. Also, settlers from nearby municipalities of San Manuel, Quirino, Burgos, Mallig, Quezon and as far as Paracelis in Mountain Province are able to purchase their commodities from Roxas.

== Culture ==
A yearly celebration of Pagay Festival(Palay Festival) held every July 4. The Festival was popularly known as the Araw ng Roxas Celebration but it was declared formally as Pagay Festival during the reign of Mayor Benedict Calderon. It is celebrated because of the rich agricultural bounty of Roxas, being one of the town that produces large stocks of rice. The festival features a Parade comprises mostly by Politicians and participating schools from different parts of Roxas, kuliglig contest and cooking of the biggest rice cake that was also featured in the national television. Major events include a Street Dance Competition from different schools and Palarong Bayan.

Due to a conflict in the name of the festival, by which the town of Alicia, Isabela, celebrates the same. It was changed to Binnadangan Festival by former Mayor Harry Soller. The Binnadangan comes from an Ilocano word meaning Bayanihan and was also derived from the former name of the town during the 1600s. The festival ends with a long Pyromusical.

== Tourism ==
Roxas Children's Park

Destination	Location	Year of Completion	Description
Roxas Freedom Park	Centro, Roxas, Isabela	2010	Memorial Park of Manuel A. Roxas, Freedom Stage, Pasalubong Center and Fountain
Children's Park	Vira, Roxas, Isabela	2000	Themed Park
Borubor Falls	Sinamar, Roxas, Isabela	Nature	Falls
Our Lady of La Salette Church	Vira, Roxas, Isabela	1970(Renovated 2011)	Church
Hadassah Resort	Munoz, Roxas, Isabela	2001	Resort
Lado Del Rio Resort	Riverside, San Placido, Roxas, Isabela	2011	Resort
Bambusa Farm	Simimbaan, Roxas, Isabela	2011	Bamboo Farm
Mountain Province-Isabela Boundary	Simimbaan, Roxas, Isabela	2017	Shared viewdeck in Simmacbot, part of Paracelis, Mountain Province

== Government ==
=== Local government ===
Roxas Municipal Hall with a view of Roxas Astrodome at the back.

As a municipality in the Province of Isabela, government officials at the provincial and municipal levels are voted by the town. The provincial government has political jurisdiction over most local transactions of the municipal government.

The Municipality of Roxas is governed by a mayor, designated as its Local Chief Executive, and by a municipal council as its legislative body in accordance with the Local Government Code. The mayor, vice mayor, and the municipal councilors are elected directly in elections held every three years.

Barangays are also headed by elected officials: Barangay Captain, Barangay Council, whose members are called Barangay Councilors. The barangays have SK federation which represents the barangay, headed by SK chairperson and whose members are called SK councilors. All officials are also elected every three years.

=== Municipal seal ===
The seal, a symbolic devise in the form of circle which symbolizes cohesive interactions of the town's people. United as one group professing common tie and pursuing a common goal. This circular figure is circumscribed by a gear-like figure in bright green with black shadings which symbolizes 26 barangays and the unprecedented economic advancement of the municipality; a vital factor in the attainment of its economic status as the trading center of the Mallig Plains Region. Inscribed on the upper half of the narrow space formed by the outer and the inner circles in red are words "BAYAN NG ROXAS" punctuated by a period on the left and other period on the right; and the lower portion of the narrow space are inscribed the words "LALAWIGAN NG ISABELA" all in words red, this narrow space has a green as background.

Inscribed in the smaller circle is the shield derived from the provincial seal of Isabela, where the municipality is located and in the middle of the shield is a bold letter "R" in white with black shadings for Roxas, the name of the municipality. Other inscriptions are on the upper most portions and on halfway below represents the irrigation canal, which are represented by a bold wave lines in sky blue. On the left side of the bold letter "R" is rice plant and on the right is a tobacco plant bold in green, the primary product of the municipality; and on the lower portion, a Vira plant in green after which the former barrio of the municipality of Gamu, now "ROXAS" got its name.

=== Elected officials ===
Members of the Roxas Municipal Council (2025–2028)
Position	Name
District Representative	Faustino Michael Carlos T. Dy III
Municipal Mayor	Benedict Calderon
Municipal Vice-Mayor	Susan Magno
Municipal Councilors	Kristin Uy
Municipal Councilors	Jonathan Navalta
Municipal Councilors	Rhenier De Leon
Municipal Councilors	Mark Hatol
Municipal Councilors	Antonio Hui
Municipal Councilors	Bong Deray
Municipal Councilors	Ave Navalta
Municipal Councilors	Clint Lanuza

Politics has been one of the local prominent issues. Benedict C. Calderon became the mayor of Roxas, defeating Dr. Harry G. Soller who had been the mayor of Roxas for three years. In the 2010 election, first automated election in Philippine History, incumbent Mayor Harry Soller lost to former Mayor Benedict Calderon with about 2000 votes. The incumbent Mayor of the town is Dok Totep Calderon who ran unopposed during the 2016 Philippine National Election.

List of Mayors:

- Rafael Lintao (1948-1955)
- David Matusalem (1956-1967)
- Teofilo Bailon (1968-1970)
- Epifanio Abad (1970-1971)
- Inocencio Uy (1972-1986)
- Benito Calderon (1986-1998)
- Harry Soller (2007-2010)
- Jonathan Jose Calderon (2016-2025)
- Benedict Calderon (1998-2007, 2011–2016 and 2025-present)

=== Congress representation ===
Roxas, belonging to the fifth legislative district of the province of Isabela, currently represented by Hon. Faustino Michael Carlos T. Dy III.

== Infrastructure ==
Roxas Freedom Park

The town of Roxas flourished by infrastructure developments during the term of former Mayor Benito Calderon particularly from 1996 wherein the roads were cemented from Barangay Bantug to San Antonio connecting the municipality to next town of San Manuel. The construction of the Roxas Public Market lead the local government to divert the national highway from Bantug-Luna-Rang Ayan to Barangays Bantug-San Rafael-San Antonio area. When Dr. Harry G. Soller took the helms of government as its Municipal Mayor, Roxas has seen an unprecedented pace in its infrastructure development too. The local government, in cooperation with then Governor Grace Padaca and Congressman Edwin Uy, has concreted 20 kilometers of roads, more or less, in the town proper as well as in the barangays. At least 10 kilometers of roads were programmed to be concreted.

Moreover, Roxas' public places, and parks have been greatly improved. New parks include the Barangay Park, which features 26 nipa huts put up by each of the barangays of Roxas which was later on closed and reopened as Al Fresco Food Court in 2016; the Roxas Freedom Park, which features a public comfort room, a Pasalubong Center, a Center Gazeebo with a fountain, and the statue of former President Manuel A. Roxas; the Forest Park in front of the municipal hall which was later on closed and re-opened as Roxas Children's Park; the now-closed Binibining Roxas Park and the Rizal Park.

Other infrastructure projects include the renovation of the municipal hall, the construction of a new module in the public market, the new vegetable trading post (Bagsakan Center), numerous flood control projects, road widening projects, and many others. Also, a Grand Terminal for jeepneys and public utility vans opened alongside Xentro Mall Roxas.

In January 2011, Department of Social Welfare and Development (DSWD) Field Office 02 Regional Director Arnel B. Garcia personally handed a check amounting to P7 million pesos on January 4, 2011, to the LGU-Roxas for the construction of 100 core shelter units. On December 28, 2011, the Local Government Unit of Roxas avails 1,000,000.00 thru the Local Government Support Fund, wherein the said amount was used to purchase lot in Barangay San Placido. The said lot was utilized for the Core Shelter and Resettlement Program for the 100 less privilege families and those affected by typhoon Juan. In 2013, incumbent Mayor Benedict Calderon launched the Core Shelter Assistance Program in the area now called, "Sitio Benito" wherein the awarding of certificate of acceptance to the indigent families was held. The Local Government Unit in partnership with the Department of Agriculture also launched the Green House Project in the CSAP area wherein beneficiaries were tasked to plant high value crops.

Core Shelter Development Program area in Sitio Benito, San Placido

=== Roxas Astrodome ===
For over six years of construction, the Sports and Entertainment Recreation building of Roxas has been completed but is still subject for future furnishing and renovation. The Roxas Astrodome is located at the back of Roxas Municipal Hall. It consists of three-level seating with capacity of 5,000 to 6,000 people. This houses different entertainment and local events.

=== Road ===
Roxas is composed of mainly municipal and barangay roads. A 22 kilometer National Road known as the Maharlika Road(Cagayan Valley Road) extends northward to the adjacent municipality of Mallig and to the province of Cagayan. The southern par extends to the adjacent municipality of San Manuel and provides the link to the cities of Santiago City and Manila. Roxas also has one provincial road from the center of the town extending eastward to the adjacent municipalities of Burgos, Gamu and Ilagan City. Municipal road extend to westward linking the town to Paracelis in Mountain Province.

The national road of Roxas is characterized by four columns of concrete asphalt road. The Municipal roads are characterized by two columns of road with Side roads made up from bricks colored in maroon. It also has street lights specially on the part of the Poblacion, while the National Road have orange-colored street lights. Access roads to all the 26 barangays connects to the national highway.

=== Protective Services ===
The Philippine National Police (PNP), 2nd District Mobile Force Company, and the Bureau of Jail Management and Penology (BJMP) maintain the peace and order situation in the municipality. They are being augmented by the barangay tanods of the 26 barangays. The Roxas Philippine National Police (PNP) is composed of 30 policemen. The ratio is one policeman is to 1,381 persons, which is better than the national standard of 1:1,000. In terms of facilities and equipment, the police station is equipped with 14 radio transceivers and three service vehicles. The municipality has two fire trucks with complete accessories being staffed by fifteen fire fighters.

=== Water and electricity ===
The municipality of Roxas is powered by the Isabela Electric Cooperative (ISELCO) District II. There are two separate power lines that divide the town. The other one connected to Aurora comprises the Barangays of San Rafael and San Antonio, while the remaining Barangays are connected to the central power facility of Roxas or the so-called Ilagan Connection. ISELCO II has its office at the center of the town. Out of the total 9,896 households, there are around 8,392 households or 84.05% have actual electrical connections. The remaining households uses kerosene, oil lamps and battery to light houses.

On the water supply, Roxas has one of the richest. Residents mostly use shallow and deep wells for reservoir, and usually pumps water through a pump-well system. Some also use electrical-power faucets and Level III water systems (large towers). The main irrigation system for the farmlands are dependent to the Siffu River and other Irrigation System managed by the National Irrigation Administration. The un-irrigated areas greatly depend on rainwater and pumped wells for its water supply.

=== Telephone and multimedia services ===
The telephone communication system of Roxas is located in Barangay Vira. There are telephone units intends for commercial use offering domestic and international services. The leading telephone line of the municipality is PLDT. Roxas receives regular broadcasting from AM and FM radio stations from other towns like Tuguegarao City and Cauayan (through relay stations). Several AM stations such as DZCV, Bombo Radyo, and DZRH are being aired in the town. Roxas has two FM Stations named WIN FM 107.5 "Nagimas sen" located in Rizal and WER 104.10 FM "Radyo104", located in the uppermost floor of Forrest Hotel. Several cellphone receptors and towers can also be located within the vicinity of the town. Smart Communications Tower is located in Barangay Vira, same as to Globe Telecom while the Sun Cellular Tower is located in Barangay Munoz. Internet services is also prominent in the town with wireless broadband internet now servicing 4G and LTE in the area.

=== Transportation ===
In terms of transportation, Roxas has the most number of bus and jeepney terminals compared to any other town in the region. Bus companies such as Victory Liner, Northern Luzon Bus Line (formerly NELBUSCO), AJA Transport, & GV Florida Transport have services bound to other parts of the provinces, Ilocos, Cagayan, Nueva Vizcaya, Pangasinan and Manila. Transportation within the town is mainly by "tricycles", a type of auto rickshaw that uses a motorcycle with an attached cab. There are also many vans which are used as a means of transportation from Roxas to other parts of the province. Many buses also pass through via Roxas routing from Cagayan to Manila and Baguio. Some of these buses are Victory Liner, Ballesteros Bus Line Corporation (BBLC), DALIN, Lizardo Trans (GL), GMW Trans (a sister company of GV Florida Transport), Maribel (a sister company of BBLC), Rosalinda and DOLBO Transportation.

Means of Transportation		Route
Bus	Victory Liner	Roxas to Manila; Tuguegarao City to Manila via Roxas; Roxas to Dagupan
Bus	AJA Transport	Roxas to Manila
Bus	GV Florida Transport	Roxas to Manila; Tuguegarao City to Manila via Roxas; Roxas to Santiago City
Bus	Ballesteros Bus Lines	Tuguegarao City to Manila via Roxas
Bus	Nelbusco (Northern Luzon Bus Line)	Roxas to Manila; Roxas to Santiago City
Bus	Public Utility Jeepney	Roxas to Ilagan City via Gamu, Roxas to Quezon; Roxas to Cauayan; Roxas to Santiago City; Roxas to Tabuk
Bus	Passenger Van	Roxas to Tuguegarao City; Roxas to Santiago City

== Healthcare ==
Roxas is primarily considered as the center of health services in Mallig Region. It has numerous primary, secondary, and tertiary hospitals. Major hospitals are usually located inside the town proper while the Manuel A. Roxas District Hospital, the only government hospital is located in Barangay San Antonio. It also houses some specialization clinics like dental clinics and skin clinics. Moreover, health centers are also available in each barangays outside the town proper.

=== Hospital/clinic ===
- Major Hospitals
  - Manuel A. Roxas District Hospital (MARDH)
  - Soller General Hospital Incorporated
  - Dumlao Hospital
  - A.M. Yumena General Hospital
  - Dayos Medical Center
  - Health City Medical Center of Isabela, Inc

== Education ==
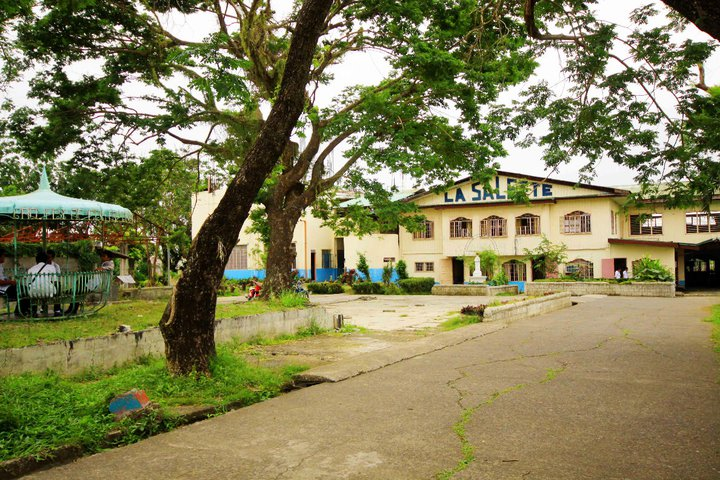
Oldest building inside the La Salette of Roxas

Public and private schools serve the people of Roxas and other neighboring towns. It has a number of public elementary schools, three public high schools, namely Roxas National High School, Lanting National High School and Muñoz National High School, the same through with the Monico Rarama National High School. A Marian institution, La Salette of Roxas, provide the private school education. It has a primary school, a high school, and a college. La Salette of Roxas is considered as the highest standard of Education in the municipality. Roxas Central School is the largest elementary school in the town.

There are also Day Care Centers each barangay and various specialized learning centers namely Roxas United Methodist Church Kindergarten School and Isabela Christian Learning Center for nursery education. There are four private elementary schools, the Casa Del Niño Montessori School, Marlbury Bush Montessori School, Shalom Learning and La Salette of Roxas-Elementary Department. There are also Colleges and Universities in the town namely University of La Salette - Roxas Campus a branch of University of La Salette - Santiago City and Isabela State University.

The Schools Division of Isabela governs the town's public education system. The division office is a field office of the DepEd in Cagayan Valley region. There are two schools district offices that govern the public and private elementary and high schools throughout the municipality, namely: Roxas East, and Roxas West.

Here are the complete list of schools within the vicinity of Roxas.

Primary and elementary schools
School	Location	Type
Roxas Central School	Rizal	Public
Roxas West Central School	Muñoz West	Public
Marcos Elementary School	Marcos	Public
Sinamar Elementary School	Sinamar	Public
San Francisco Elementary School	San Placido	Public
Nuesa Elementary School	Sotero Nuesa	Public
Bantug-Lintao Elementary School	Bantug	Public
Simimbaan Integrated School	Simimbaan	Public
San Rafael Elementary School	San Rafael	Public
San Antonio Elementary School	San Antonio	Public
Matusalem Elementary School	Matusalem	Public
San Pedro-Villa Concepcion Elementary School	Villa Concepcion	Public
Doña Concha Elementary School	Doña Concha	Public
Imbiao Elementary School	Imbiao	Public
Anao Elementary School	Anao	Public
Quiling Elementary School	Quiling	Public
Luna-Rang-Ayan Elementary School	Luna	Public
San Jose Elementary School	San Jose	Public
Lanting Elementary School	Lanting	Public
Lucban Elementary School	Lucban	Public
Marlbury Bush Montessori School	Rizal	Private
La Salette of Roxas	Vira	Private
Casa Del Nino Montessori School	San Rafael	Private
Shalom Learning Center	Munoz	Private
Little Angels Learning Center Inc.	Munoz	Private
Image Maker Learning Center	Bantug	

Secondary schools
School	Location	Type
ISU Laboratory High School	Rang-Ayan	Public (University)
Roxas National High School	Bantug	Public
Roxas National High School	Matusalem	Public
Lanting National High School	Lanting	Public
Monico Rarama National High School	San Pedro	Public
Muñoz National High School	Muñoz	Public
Casa del Niño Montessori School	San Rafael	Private
La Salette of Roxas	Vira	Private
Top Achievers Private School (TAPS)	San Manuel	Private

Higher educational institutions
School	Location	Type
Isabela Colleges of Science & Technology	Rizal	College
Isabela State University	Rang-Ayan	Public University
Isabela State University	Matusalem	Public University
University of La Salette-Roxas Campus	Vira	Private University

== Notable personalities ==
- 4th Impact – Filipino girl group
