= La Salette =

La Salette can refer to:

- La Salette, Ontario, a hamlet in Norfolk County, Ontario, Canada
- La Salette-Fallavaux, a commune in the Isère department, France
  - La Salette, Isère, a village in the commune La Salette-Fallavaux
  - Our Lady of La Salette, a pilgrimage location in La Salette, France
- Notre-Dame-de-la-Salette, Quebec, a village and municipality in Outaouais region, Quebec, Canada
- La Salette of Roxas, a private marian institution in Roxas, Isabela, Philippines.
- University of La Salette, a private Catholic university in Santiago City, Philippines.
- The National Shrine of Our Lady of La Salette, in Attleboro, Massachusetts.
