= Quirino, Isabela =

Municipality in Isabela, Philippines

Quirino
- Municipality
- Municipality of Quirino
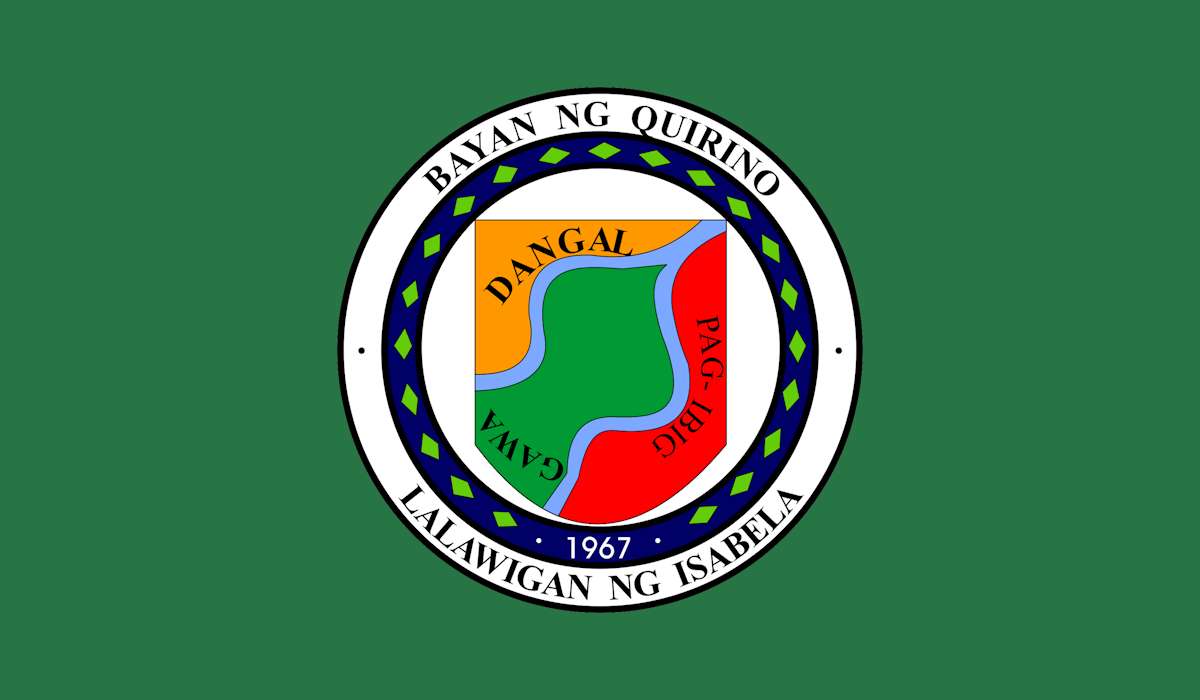
- Flag Seal
- Motto: Abante! Quirino! Tuloy-tuloy ti progreso (Abante! Quirino! Continue to make progress)
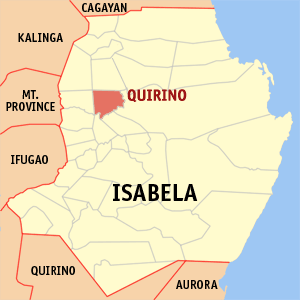
- Map of Isabela with Quirino highlighted
- Interactive map of Quirino
- Location within the Philippines
- Coordinates: 17°08′08″N 121°44′06″E
- Country: Philippines
- Region: Cagayan Valley
- Province: Isabela
- District: 5th district
- Founded: June 17, 1967
- Named for: Elpidio Quirino
- Barangays: 21 (see Barangays)

Government
  - Type: Sangguniang Bayan
  - Mayor: Edward D. Juan
  - Vice Mayor: Victor Emmanuel G. Callangan
  - Representative: Faustino Michael Carlos T. Dy III
  - Electorate: 16,742 voters (2025)

Area
  - Total: 126.20 km^{2} (48.73 sq mi)
- Elevation: 50 m (160 ft)
- Lowest elevation: 12 m (39 ft)

Population (2024 census)
  - Total: 25,205
  - Density: 199.72/km^{2} (517.28/sq mi)
  - Households: 6,632

Economy
  - Income class: 1st municipal income class
  - Poverty incidence: 10.07% (2023)
  - Revenue: ₱ 462 million (2024)
  - Assets: ₱ 2,161 million (2024)
  - Expenditure: ₱ 241.9 million (2024)
  - Liabilities: ₱ 326.4 million (2024)

Service provider
  - Electricity: Isabela 2 Electric Cooperative (ISELCO 2)
- Time zone: UTC+8 (PST)
- ZIP code: 3321
- PSGC: 0203123000
- IDD : area code: +63 (0)78
- Native languages: Ibanag; Ilocano; Tagalog
- Website: www.quirino-isabela.gov.ph

Quirino, officially the Municipality of Quirino (Ilocano: Ili ti Quirino; Tagalog: Bayan ng Quirino), is a municipality in the province of Isabela, Philippines. According to the 2024 census, it has a population of 25,205 people.

== Etymology ==
Quirino was named in honor of President Elpidio Quirino.

== History ==
Quirino was established by virtue of Republic Act No. 4901 dated June 17, 1967. It is located in the Mallig Plains in Western Isabela and has a total land area of 126.20 square kilometers. Agriculture is the primary industry for the local inhabitants.

== Geography ==
Quirino is a primarily agricultural town situated in the Mallig Plains region. The town is known for its sprawling flat lands used for growing crops such as palay or rice, peanut, corn, tobacco, and vegetables.

It is bounded to the north by Delfin Albano, Mallig to the northwest, Roxas to the southwest, Burgos and Gamu to the south and Ilagan City to the east.

Quirino is 19.65 kilometres (12.21 mi) east of Ilagan (provincial capital), and 428.18 kilometres (266.06 mi) north of capital Manila.

=== Barangays ===
Quirino is politically subdivided into 21 barangays. Each barangay consists of puroks while some have sitios.

- Binarzang
- Cabaruan
- Camaal
- Dolores
- Luna (Poblacion)
- Manaoag
- Rizal
- San Isidro
- San Jose
- San Juan
- San Mateo
- San Vicente
- Santa Catalina
- Santa Lucia
- Santiago (Villa Cacho)
- Santo Domingo
- Sinait
- Suerte
- Villa Bulusan
- Villa Miguel (Tabok)
- Vintar

=== Climate ===
Climate data for Quirino, Isabela
Month	Jan	Feb	Mar	Apr	May	Jun	Jul	Aug	Sep	Oct	Nov	Dec	Year
Mean daily maximum °C (°F)	29 (84)	30 (86)	32 (90)	35 (95)	35 (95)	35 (95)	34 (93)	33 (91)	32 (90)	31 (88)	30 (86)	28 (82)	32 (90)
Mean daily minimum °C (°F)	19 (66)	20 (68)	21 (70)	23 (73)	23 (73)	24 (75)	23 (73)	23 (73)	23 (73)	22 (72)	21 (70)	20 (68)	22 (71)
Average precipitation mm (inches)	31.2 (1.23)	23 (0.9)	27.7 (1.09)	28.1 (1.11)	113.5 (4.47)	141.4 (5.57)	176.4 (6.94)	236.6 (9.31)	224.9 (8.85)	247.7 (9.75)	222.9 (8.78)	178 (7.0)	1,651.4 (65)
Average rainy days	10	6	5	5	13	12	15	15	15	17	16	15	144
Source: World Weather Online

== Demographics ==
Population census of Quirino
Year	Pop.	±% p.a.
1970	10,415	—
1975	12,571	+3.85%
1980	14,372	+2.71%
1990	17,070	+1.74%
1995	18,320	+1.33%
2000	19,986	+1.88%
2007	21,192	+0.81%
2010	22,285	+1.85%
2015	24,501	+1.82%
2020	25,023	+0.44%
2024	25,205	+0.17%
Source: Philippine Statistics Authority

In the 2024 census, the population of Quirino was 25,205 people, with a density of 200 inhabitants per square kilometre or 520 inhabitants per square mile.

== Economy ==
As of December 31, 2024, there are 21 barangays in the municipality. In terms of economic classification, all barangays are considered rural.

Poverty incidence of Quirino (%)

Source: Philippine Statistics Authority

=== Cabaruan Solar-Powered Pump Irrigation Project ===
On June 10, 2024, President Bongbong Marcos inaugurated the largest solar-powered pump irrigation project (SPIP) in the Philippines located in Barangay Cabaruan. The event was attended by National Irrigation Administration (NIA) Administrator Eduardo G. Guillen, Speaker Martin Romualdez, Representative Tonypet Albano, Governor Rodolfo Albano III, and Quirino Mayor Edward D. Juan.

The project, implemented by the National Irrigation Administration (NIA) with a budget of ₱65.77 million, aims to provide free irrigation to 350 hectares of rice fields, benefitting approximately 237 farmers in Isabela, often referred to as the Rice Granary of the North.

The system operates under the Magat River Integrated Irrigation System (NIA MARIIS) in Ramon, Isabela. It utilizes 1,056 solar panels to power two submersible pumps, capable of discharging 12,800 gallons of water per minute.

== Government ==
=== Local government ===
As a municipality in the province of Isabela, government officials at the provincial and municipal levels are voted by the town. The provincial government has political jurisdiction over most local transactions of the municipal government.

The municipality of Quirino is governed by a mayor being designated as its local chief executive, and by a municipal council as its legislative body in accordance with the Local Government Code. The mayor, vice mayor, and the municipal councilors are elected directly in elections held every three years.

Currently, there are 21 barangays which are also headed by elected officials: Barangay Captain, as the chief executive, and Barangay Council, whose members are called Barangay Councilors act as legislators. These barangays also have SK federation which represents the barangay, headed by SK chairperson and whose members are called SK councilors. All officials are also elected every three years.

=== Elected officials ===
Members of the Quirino Municipal Council (2022-2025)
Position	Name
District Representative	Faustino Michael Carlos T. Dy III
Municipal Mayor	Edward D. Juan
Municipal Vice-Mayor	Victor Emmanuel G. Callangan
Municipal Councilors	Adela B. Corpuz
Municipal Councilors	Jayson Anthony G. Callangan
Municipal Councilors	Earl N. Diampoc
Municipal Councilors	Rosalino P. Buguina
Municipal Councilors	Emelito S. Espiritu
Municipal Councilors	Willy R. Lucas
Municipal Councilors	Ricarte D. Ginez
Municipal Councilors	Mercelita M. Aquino

=== Congress representation ===
Quirino, belonging to the fifth legislative district of the province of Isabela, currently represented by Hon. Faustino Michael Carlos T. Dy III.

== Education ==
The Schools Division of Isabela governs the town's public education system. The division office is a field office of the DepEd in Cagayan Valley region. The Quirino Schools District office governs the public elementary and high schools throughout the municipality with the following schools.

=== Primary and elementary schools ===
- Binarzang Elementary School
- Cabaruan Elementary School
- Camaal Elementary School
- Luna Suerte Elementary School
- Manaoag Elementary School
- Quirino Central School
- Rizal Elementary School
- San Jose Elementary School
- San Juan Elementary School
- San Mateo Elementary School
- San Vicente Elementary School
- Santiago Elementary School
- Sinait Elementary School
- Sta. Catalina Elementary School
- Suerte Elementary School
- Villa Miguel Elementary School
- Vintar Elementary School

=== Secondary schools ===
- Quirino National High School
- Rizal Comprehensive National High School
- Sto. Domingo Integrated School
