= Mallig =

Municipality in Isabela, Philippines

- Municipality
- Municipality of Mallig
- Mallig Town Proper

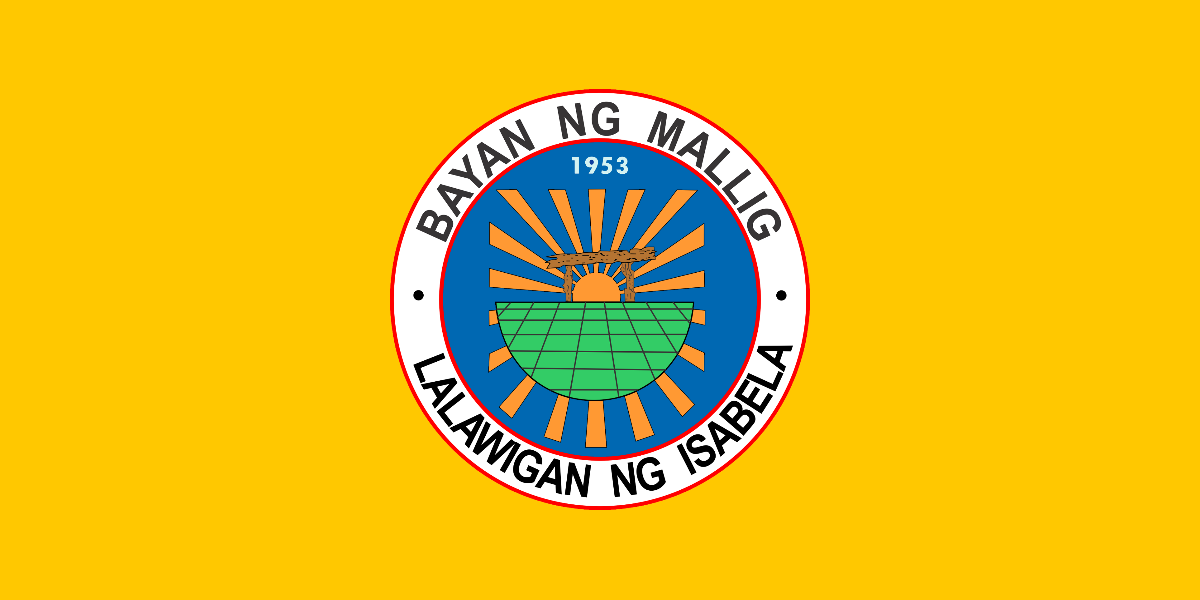
- Flag Seal
- Nickname: Great Plains of Isabela
- Anthem: Mallig kong mahal.
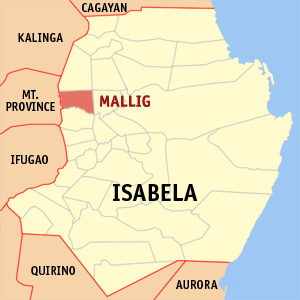
- Map of Isabela with Mallig highlighted
- Interactive map of Mallig
- Location within the Philippines
- Coordinates: 17°12′31″N 121°36′38″E
- Country: Philippines
- Region: Cagayan Valley
- Province: Isabela
- District: 5th district
- Founded: April 8, 1952
- Barangays: 18 (see Barangays)

Government
  - Type: Sangguniang Bayan
  - Mayor: Jose Philip F. Calderon
  - Vice Mayor: Deo Elefante
  - Representative: Faustino Michael Carlos T. Dy III
  - Electorate: 20,355 voters (2025)

Area
  - Total: 133.40 km^{2} (51.51 sq mi)
- Elevation: 95 m (312 ft)
- Highest elevation: 368 m (1,207 ft)
- Lowest elevation: 44 m (144 ft)

Population (2024 census)
  - Total: 32,509
  - Density: 243.70/km^{2} (631.17/sq mi)
  - Households: 7,814

Economy
  - Income class: 1st municipal income class
  - Poverty incidence: 15.64% (2023)
  - Revenue: ₱ 343.7 million (2024)
  - Assets: ₱ 1,410 million (2024)
  - Expenditure: ₱ 224.7 million (2024)
  - Liabilities: ₱ 184.3 million (2024)

Service provider
  - Electricity: Isabela 2 Electric Cooperative (ISELCO 2)
- Time zone: UTC+8 (PST)
- ZIP code: 3323
- PSGC: 0203119000
- IDD : area code: +63 (0)78
- Native languages: Ibanag; Ilocano; Tagalog
- Website: www.malligisabela.com

Mallig, officially the Municipality of Mallig (Ilocano: Ili ti Mallig; Tagalog: Bayan ng Mallig), is a landlocked municipality in the province of Isabela, Philippines. According to the 2024 census, it has a population of 32,509 people.

== Etymology ==
The municipality was named after the Mallig River that runs through it.

== History ==
The area was first mentioned by Fray Pedro de Santo Tomas as the area to which the Irraya/Gaddang fled after the revolt of Dayag and Catabay in 1621 in what is now Ilagan City.

In 1939, then President Manuel L. Quezon declared the westernmost part of the province as a resettlement area, historically known as the Mallig Plains Resettlement Area. From then on, the influx of settlers from the Central Plains and the Ilocos Region encouraged more other settlers to migrate westward in these Kalinga-dominated plains.

Mallig was created by virtue of Republic Act No. 678 authored in 1952 by then-Congressman Samuel F. Reyes. The act was approved on April 8, 1952, with the former barrio of Olango as the seat of government. The territory comprising Mallig was taken from several neighboring towns:

- from Roxas: barangay of Holy Friday, San Jose (East), and San Jose (West)
- from Ilagan: barangay of Casili, Olango Primero, Olango Segundo, San Jose Nuevo, and Manano
- from Tumauini: barangay of Barucbuc, Siempre Viva Norte, Siempre Viva Sur Bimmonton, Pasurgong, Manga, and Settlement No. 1
- from Santo Tomas: barangay of Abut and Minagbag

ON June 21, 1959, the barrios and sitios of Abut, Barucboc Norte, Cauayan, Estrada, Lepanto, Malalao, Manga, Maragato, Minagbag, Pasurgong, PODCO, Settlement No. I, and Turod were separated from Mallig to form the new municipality of Quezon, by virtue of Republic Act No. 2418.

Mallig was a harsh abode for the migrants at the beginning, particularly because of the hostile natives who dominated the area, and also because of the occurrence of endemic malaria. It took the settlers gradual adaptation and acclimatization before they finally convinced their relatives and other migrants to settle permanently.

== Geography ==
Mallig is bounded by the towns of Paracelis on its western limits, Quezon on its northern limits, Roxas on its southern limits and by both Delfin Albano and Quirino on its eastern limits. The municipality has a land area of 133.40 square kilometers or 51.51 square miles which constitutes 1.07% of Isabela's total area.

Its main gateway is the Santiago–Tuguegarao Road which is a part of the national highway. The Ilagan–Delfin Albano–Mallig Road, a provincial road, also serves as an important point of entry to Mallig. It is also an agricultural town mainly composed of agricultural farms such as rice fields and corn fields which makes its rural landscape.

Mallig is situated 37.33 kilometres (23.20 mi) from the provincial capital Ilagan, and 425.19 kilometres (264.20 mi) from the country's capital city of Manila.

=== Barangays ===
Mallig is politically subdivided into 18 barangays. Each barangay consists of puroks while some have sitios.

- San Pedro (Barucbuc Sur)
- Bimonton
- Casili
- Centro I
- Holy Friday
- Jacinto Baniqued (Centro II pob)
- Maligaya
- Manano
- Olango
- Rang-ayan
- San Jose Norte I
- San Jose Sur
- Siempre Viva Norte
- Trinidad
- Victoria
- San Jose Norte II
- San Ramon
- Siempre Viva Sur

=== Climate ===
Climate data for Mallig, Isabela
Month	Jan	Feb	Mar	Apr	May	Jun	Jul	Aug	Sep	Oct	Nov	Dec	Year
Mean daily maximum °C (°F)	29 (84)	30 (86)	32 (90)	35 (95)	35 (95)	35 (95)	34 (93)	33 (91)	32 (90)	31 (88)	30 (86)	28 (82)	32 (90)
Mean daily minimum °C (°F)	19 (66)	20 (68)	21 (70)	23 (73)	23 (73)	24 (75)	23 (73)	23 (73)	23 (73)	22 (72)	21 (70)	20 (68)	22 (71)
Average precipitation mm (inches)	31.2 (1.23)	23 (0.9)	27.7 (1.09)	28.1 (1.11)	113.5 (4.47)	141.4 (5.57)	176.4 (6.94)	236.6 (9.31)	224.9 (8.85)	247.7 (9.75)	222.9 (8.78)	178 (7.0)	1,651.4 (65)
Average rainy days	10	6	5	5	13	12	15	15	15	17	16	15	144
Source: World Weather Online

The climate in Mallig is tropical. Mallig has significant rainfall most months, with a short dry season. This location is classified as Am by Köppen and Geiger. The temperature here averages 27.0 °C. The average annual rainfall is 1784 mm.

== Demographics ==
Population census of Mallig

Year	Pop.	±% p.a.
1960	8,837	—
1970	11,920	+3.03%
1975	14,389	+3.85%
1980	17,181	+3.61%
1990	22,060	+2.53%
1995	23,344	+1.07%

Year	Pop.	±% p.a.
2000	25,918	+2.27%
2007	27,245	+0.69%
2010	28,345	+1.45%
2015	30,459	+1.38%
2020	32,208	+1.18%
2024	32,509	+0.22%

Source: Philippine Statistics Authority

In the 2024 census, the population of Mallig was 32,509 people, with a density of 240 inhabitants per square kilometre or 620 inhabitants per square mile.

== Economy ==
Poverty incidence of Mallig (%)

Source: Philippine Statistics Authority

Mallig Public Market

Mallig is considered as one of the largest exporters of rice, corn, and tobacco in the Mallig Plains Region.

=== Major industries ===
Mallig is one of the top producers of agricultural products in the province. Its principal crops is mainly rice but corn and tobacco are produced in quantity. The municipality is often referred to as the "rice and nateng capital of the province." Other major crops are mango, calamansi (calamondin orange), banana, peanut, and vegetables.

== Government ==
=== Local government ===
As a municipality in the province of Isabela, government officials at the provincial and municipal levels are voted by the town. The provincial government has political jurisdiction over most local transactions of the municipal government.

The Municipality of Mallig is governed by a mayor, designated as its Local Chief Executive, and by a municipal council as its legislative body in accordance with the Local Government Code. The mayor, vice mayor, and the municipal councilors are elected directly by the people in elections held every three years.

Barangays are also headed by elected officials: Barangay Captain, Barangay Council, whose members are called Barangay Councilors. The barangays have SK federation which represents the barangay, headed by SK chairperson and whose members are called SK councilors. All officials are also elected every three years.

=== Elected officials ===
Members of the Mallig Municipal Council (2022–2025)
Position	Name
District Representative	Faustino Michael Carlos T. Dy III
Municipal Mayor	Jose Philip F. Calderon
Municipal Vice-Mayor	Diosdado B. Felipe
Municipal Councilors	Deo Angelo G. Elefante
Municipal Councilors	Carlos V. Balagan
Municipal Councilors	Ronaldo V. Baniqued
Municipal Councilors	Angelito O. Ramiscal Jr.
Municipal Councilors	Marjorie P. Isidro
Municipal Councilors	Samuel A. Baniqued
Municipal Councilors	Petra R. Pascual
Municipal Councilors	Princess Jamille L. Carasig

=== Congress representation ===
Mallig, belonging to the fifth legislative district of the province of Isabela, currently represented by Hon. Faustino Michael Carlos T. Dy III.

== Education ==
The Schools Division of Isabela governs the town's public education system. The division office is a field office of the DepEd in Cagayan Valley. The XXXX Schools District Office governs all educational institutions within the municipality. It oversees the management and operations of all private and public, from primary to secondary schools.

=== Primary and elementary schools ===
- Casili United Methodist Christian School
- Holy Friday Elementary School
- Home Sweet School
- Maligaya Elementary School
- Mallig Baptist School
- Mallig Central School (Main)
- Mallig Central School - Casili Primary School (Annex)
- Manano Elementary School (Main)
- Manano Elementary School - Sitio Villa Corazon Primary School (Annex)
- Olango Elementary School
- Rang-ayan Elementary School
- San Jose Norte Elementary School
- San Jose Sur Elementary School
- San Pedro Elementary School
- San Ramon Elementary School
- Siempre Viva Elementary School
- Trinidad Elementary School
- Victoria Elementary School

=== Secondary schools ===
- Mallig National High School-Main
- Mallig Plains National High School
- San Jose National High School
- Bimonton Integrated School

=== Higher educational institution ===
- Mallig Plains Colleges
