= Isabela's 5th congressional district =

Legislative district of the Philippines

- Constituency for the House of Representatives of the Philippines
- Boundary of Isabela's 5th congressional district in Isabela

- Location of Isabela within the Philippines
- Province: Isabela
- Region: Cagayan Valley
- Population: 267,550 (2020)
- Electorate: 172,212 (2025)
- Major settlements: 8 LGUs: Municipalities; Aurora; Burgos; Luna; Mallig; Quezon; Quirino; Roxas; San Manuel
- Area: 981.43 km^{2} (378.93 sq mi)

Current constituency
- Created: 2018
- Representative: Faustino Michael Carlos T. Dy III
- Political party: Lakas–CMD
- Congressional bloc: Majority

Isabela's 5th congressional district is one of the six congressional districts of the Philippines in the province of Isabela. It has been represented in the House of Representatives of the Philippines since 2019. The district consists of the municipalities of Aurora, Burgos, Luna, Mallig, Quezon, Quirino, Roxas, and San Manuel. It is currently represented in the 20th Congress by Faustino Michael Carlos T. Dy III of the Lakas–CMD, who has represented the district since its creation.

== Representation history ==
#	Image	Member	Term of office		Congress	Party	Electoral history	Constituent LGUs
#	Image	Member	Start	End	Congress	Party	Electoral history	Constituent LGUs
=== Isabela's 5th district for the House of Representatives of the Philippines ===
District created September 27, 2018.
1		Faustino Michael Carlos T. Dy III	June 30, 2019	Incumbent	18th	PFP	Elected in 2019.	2019–present: Aurora, Burgos, Luna, Mallig, Quezon, Quirino, Roxas, San Manuel
1		Faustino Michael Carlos T. Dy III	June 30, 2019	Incumbent	19th	NPC	Re-elected in 2022.	2019–present: Aurora, Burgos, Luna, Mallig, Quezon, Quirino, Roxas, San Manuel
1		Faustino Michael Carlos T. Dy III	June 30, 2019	Incumbent	19th	Lakas	Re-elected in 2022.	2019–present: Aurora, Burgos, Luna, Mallig, Quezon, Quirino, Roxas, San Manuel
1		Faustino Michael Carlos T. Dy III	June 30, 2019	Incumbent	20th	Lakas	Re-elected in 2025.	2019–present: Aurora, Burgos, Luna, Mallig, Quezon, Quirino, Roxas, San Manuel

== Electoral history ==
=== 2025 ===
Candidate	Party	Votes	%
Mike Dy III (incumbent)	Lakas–CMD	98,151	100.00
Total		98,151	100.00
Valid votes		98,151	66.79
Invalid/blank votes		48,808	33.21
Total votes		146,959	100.00
Registered voters/turnout		172,212	85.34
Lakas–CMD hold			
Source: Commission on Elections

=== 2022 ===
Candidate	Party	Votes	%
Mike Dy III (incumbent)	Nationalist People's Coalition	82,062	66.47
Kristin Uy	PDP–Laban	39,038	31.62
Gilbert San Pedro	PDP–Laban	2,353	1.91
Total		123,453	100.00
Total votes		146,019	–
Registered voters/turnout		174,976	83.45
Nationalist People's Coalition hold			
Source: Commission on Elections

== See also ==
- Legislative districts of Isabela
