= La Salette of Roxas College =

Roman Catholic college in Isabela, Philippines

La Salette of Roxas College, Inc.
- Former names: Mallig Academy (1957–present)
- Motto: Plenitudo Vitae
- Motto in English: Fullness of Life
- Type: Private Catholic non-profit coeducational basic and higher education institution
- Established: June 1957; 69 years ago
- Founders: Missionaries of Our Lady of La Salette
- Accreditation: PAASCU
- Religious affiliation: Roman Catholic (La Salettes)
- President: Rev. Fr. Constante Dannug, MS
- Principal: Sr. Myrna I. Pinera, SFIC (Basic Education Principal)
- Dean: Sr. Myrna I. Pinera, SFIC
- Director: Rev. Fr. Constante Dannug, MS
- Location: Magsaysay St. Vira, Roxas, Isabela, Philippines; 17°06′59″N 121°37′11″E
- Campus: 3.335 hectares (8.24 acres)
- Colors: Royal blue & white
- Sporting affiliations: LASSAA
- Mascot: Blue Lions

La Salette of Roxas College, is a private Catholic, coeducational basic and higher education institution run by the Missionaries of Our Lady of La Salette in Vira, Roxas, Isabela, Philippines. It was founded by the La Salettes on September 17, 1958. It is the only Catholic school in the municipality and is one of the leading educational institution in Isabela.

It has seven sister schools also all named La Salette and are also all located in the province of Isabela. They are as follows: La Salette of Aurora, La Salette of Quezon, La Salette of Ramon, La Salette of San Mateo, La Salette of Cabatuan, La Salette of Cordon and University of La Salette- Santiago City. It is a Catholic school which provides the youth of the town of Roxas an education on the Catholic Faiith. The Blessed Virgin Mary under the title Our Lady of La Salette is the patroness of La Salette of Roxas.

== History ==
Fr. Conrad H. Blanchet, MS in 1949.

The first of the La Salette missionaries who went to Roxas was Fr. Blanchet on February 28, 1949. In June 1957, the La Salette Fathers from United States of America went to the town of Roxas to fulfill their mission in educating the youth. The school was formerly known as Mallig Academy.

It was in May 1964, when the vice-provincial of the La Salette Missionaries entered into an agreement with the Superior General of the congregation of the Franciscans of the Immaculate Conception of the Holy Mother of God for the sisters to take charge of the principalship, religion classes, and guidance services of the school.

In 1979, the principalship for the school was turned over to the lay people. However, the Sisters up to the present time retained the Christian formation program and guidance services.

Before, the school originally was on a 20,000 square meter lot. Later, the campus expanded to an adjacent lot of 3,358 square meters in July 1960 and another lot of 10,000 square meters in November 1964.

The school year 1988-89 ushered in an era of uncertainty for the school. With the passage and implementation of the free Secondary Education Bill, the DECS limitation on tuition fee increases, and the teachers clamor for higher wages, the school was beset with survival problems. There were fears and apprehensions of mass transfer of students and teachers to the public schools. However, in contrary to expectations, the school experienced a considerable increase in its student population especially due to the increase of numbers of transferees from the public schools and due to the Education Service Contracting Scheme being provided by the government. Luckily, the school kept 99% of its employees with only two teachers leaving the school for greener pastures.

In 2008, La Salette of Roxas celebrated its 50th anniversary. La Salette has been serving the Mallig Region the highest quality of education. In 2013, the school changed its name from La Salette of Roxas to La Salette of Roxas College.

== Our Lady of La Salette ==
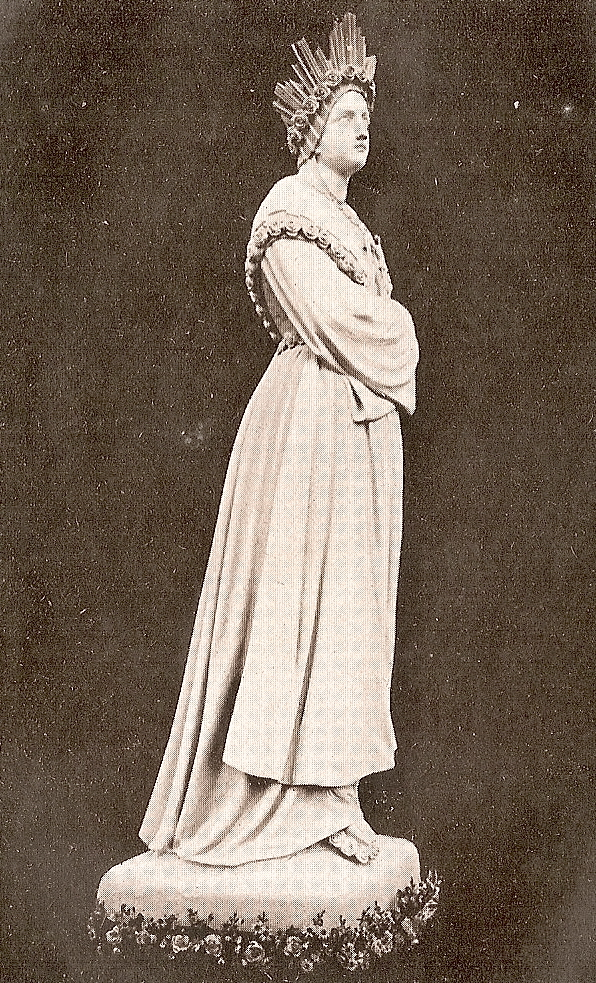
Statue of Our Lady of La Salette, ascending into heaven (third stage of the apparition)

Our Lady of La Salette is the official patron and the carrier name for the school. The parish church beside the campus was also named after La Salette since the school originally owned the parish.

It was on September 19, 1846, when the Virgin Mary appeared to two French children named Mélanie Calvat and Maximin Giraud in the mountain of La Salette in France. It was said that the Virgin Mary is speaking with tears, and told the two children that unless people repented she would be forced to let go the arm of her son because it had become so heavy. The Virgin Mary went on to complain that she had to pray ceaselessly to her son for them, but the people still worked during Sundays and blasphemed. Mary also spoke of coming punishments for these sins, including crop blights and famine. She confided a secret to each of the children, which they were not to divulge, although eventually these secrets were made known to Pope Pius IX. Finally she asked the children to spread her message before disappearing. The famous phrase from the Virgin Mary goes "Come near my Children, do not be afraid...".

After the apparition, only few people believed what the children saw and heard. The farmers who came into contact with the children where amazed at them. They were so ignorant, and yet they were able to transmit and communicate, in French, a complicated message which they did not understand well. As well, they were able to do this clearly and with precise descriptions. Mélanie Calvat and Maximin Giraud were constantly interrogated by curious people as well as their devoted ones. They simply said the same story, repeating it over and over. To those interested in going up the mountain, they take them to the place where Our Lady appeared. On several occasions, they were threatened with jail if they did not deny the alleged apparitions and if they continued to speak about them. Without fear or hesitation, they continued to report all the messages that Our Lady gave them.

The apparition was approved by the name Our Lady of La Salette by Pope Pius IX and verified the apparition of the Virgin Mary.

In 2007, the Statue of Our Lady of La Salette from France was placed in La Salette of Roxas and in other La Salette Schools in Isabela.

== Departments ==
=== Grade school ===
La Salette of Roxas Elementary Department is a Catholic elementary school offering education for students from the kindergarten level to the sixth grade. Its facilities and classrooms are located in one building. The Grade School shares the athletic facilities with the high school.

The curriculum for the grade school focuses on basic elementary education, by which Filipino, Christian Living, Language(English), Science, Art, Music, Computer, and Arithmetic are introduced in Kindergarten 1 and 2. Language Arts, Science, Music, Mathematics, Computer and Physical Education are taught in Grades 1–6.

=== High school ===
La Salette of Roxas High School Department is a Catholic secondary school. Its department is located within the New Building built in 2003.

The high school curriculum focuses mainly on college preparatory education in which English (Grammar, Literature, Rhetoric and Reading), Mathematics, Science, Social Science, Christian Living, and Filipino make up the academic subjects while Arts and Technology (includes Music and Integrated Arts), Computer, and Physical Education and Health make up the co-curricular subjects which are all taught through first to fourth Year High School.

=== College ===
The La Salette of Roxas houses the branch for University of La Salette. It offers courses such as Bachelor of Science in Nursing, Education, Information Technology and Accountancy.

== Campus ==
La Salette of Roxas campus map (including Our Lady of La Salette Parish Church)

The school is located on an almost 40,000 square meters campus along Magsaysay St in Vira, Roxas, Isabela.

=== St. Francis Hall ===
The St. Francis Hall is said to be one of the oldest buildings in the campus and houses classrooms for First year Students. In 2007, it was renovated and converted into offices. It is a one-level building which houses the Balay ti Alumni (Office of the Alumni) which also serves as room for other school services such as storage for offerings from Belen every December and as a Debate Room for English classes. The Guidance and Counselor's Office is also located here as with the Prefect of Discipline Office which used to be a comfort room, serves as the Disciplinary Office for students not abiding the rules and regulations for school such as incomplete uniform and late comers. The Office of the Informer is also located here and exits through the Red Bench which acts as the Informer(school publication)'s meeting place.

=== St. Alphonse Hall ===
The first floor houses the Director's Office and Cashier. The Cashier is responsible for the Tuition Fees and Miscellaneous Fees of the students. Before examinations, students who are not paid in Cash are required to pay Tuition Fees at the Cashier's Office. The Hall also houses the Chemistry and Physics Laboratory for science class experiments. The room is complete with basic apparatus for experiments.

The second floor is occupied by the school Library. The Library houses books separated by each category, and study tables for review and assignments.

=== New Building ===
The New Building is the newest and the largest building in the campus built in 2003. It serves as the High School Department and houses some offices. It is a three-level elongated building with 9 rooms each level.

The first floor houses the Office of the Registrar who handles all students records and the Principal's Office. The principal is usually a nun and a member of CFIC. The Faculty Room occupied by almost 50 Staffs is also located here. Classrooms for Fourth Year High Schools and Grades 5-6 is situated in the New Building.

The second floor houses the Dental Clinic which regularly check the dental health of the students and the Sound Room that is responsible for the school sound system. Computer Laboratories with 70 Computer units and Classrooms for Third year high school. One section for Second-year high school is also here.

The third floor houses Classrooms for First Year and Second year high school. Each level, Comfort Rooms are very apparent. Male CR are located on the right-most of each level, while Female CR are on the opposite wing.

=== Elementary Building ===
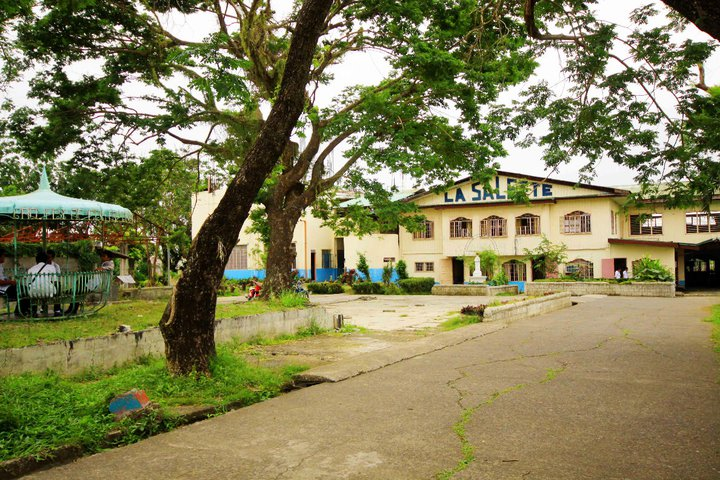
Building I - The oldest building of La Salette of Roxas

The Elementary Building is situated on the left-most part of the campus housing the classrooms for Pre-School and Grade School except for Grades 5 and 6. On the left-most part, the Stage for Elementary Department can be located. It showcases different activities and programs for Elementary students.

=== Building I/Building II ===
The Building 1 is the oldest building in the campus housing classrooms for College students. On the second floor, a dormitory can be located but later changed into few more classrooms. The Building II, a two-level modern building houses the offices and computer laboratories for College students. At the back of the Building II, an old Narra tree with a kiosko and the Sisters' Convent and Garden can be found. The pathway connecting the two exits into the Our Lady of La Salette Parish.

The Building I and II also houses the School Auditorium which is a big indoor arena that serves as the main venue for all school events especially during rainy season. It also serves as a practice room for the students participating in competitions in and out of the school. Also, every Thursday Eucharistic celebration is celebrated here whenever the Parish Church is unavailable.

=== TLE Building ===
The TLE or Technology and Livelihood Education Building is a one-level building housing the school kitchen for the subject, TLE. It offers complete utensils for students engaging in the culinary and livelihood education and catering area. This building served as the Director's residence before.

=== Gymnasium ===
The Gymnasium is located beside the Building I and II and remains uncompleted to date. It is situated in the former area of the Old Convent. However, this will serve as the Physical Education Area in the future.

=== School ground ===
Charism, Vision, Mission and School Directory of La Salette of Roxas in the Rosary Garden.

The school provides certain courts for each sport for Physical Education and for Intramurals and Foundation Day. The school has two Basketball Courts and a Volleyball Court located in front of the Building I. The campus also has Tennis Court and Sepak Takraw Court beside the Biology Garden and Rosary Garden. Also, Softball Game can be done on the Softball ground with a carpet grass landscape.

Eight yellow benches for student waiting area for dismissal and bunch break are located along the school fence. The playground for elementary students is located between the Elementary Building and parking lot. There are also covered pathways and cemented pathways leading to different school buildings.

A Grotto built in 2008 is situated in front of New Building and features a Giant Virgin Mary. The Grotto depicts the Apparition of the Virgin Mary to Mélanie Calvat and Maximin Giraud in the Mountain of La Salette in France in 1846.

In the College Department, there used to be a giant map of the Philippines made from cement that can be seen but during the renovation process, it was replaced by a building that houses offices for the university. A gymnasium is located beside the former Auditorium (now Building I) after being completed in 2011.

The school has three gates- Main Gate, Elementary Gate and the University Gate

=== Chapel, canteen and garden ===
The school also has a newly constructed chapel built in 2008. It is located between the TLE Building and St. Alphonse Hall. The Chapel has a mini pond and a small bridge connecting into the main hallway. The chapel was designed in a modern way with the Our Lady of La Salette in the altar. It serves as Prayer room for students and is open any time.

The campus has two canteens. The Main Canteen is located beside the New Building and Elementary building and serves as Canteen for High School and Elementary Students. The second canteen is located inside the Building I and serves as canteen for College students.

The Rosary Garden is located in front of St. Alphonse Hall. A giant rosary with beads made up of cement is situated here, and a shrine for Our Lady of La Salette in a center of a gazeebo. It is being lightened every night with different colored-lights and by candles during the Rosary Month. The Biology Garden is situated between the Basketball Court and Tennis Court. The garden houses various types of plants taken care by students taking Biology Class. It also houses a Nipa Hut and a pond.

== Extra-curricular ==
Extra-curricular is one of the three main factors that contribute in the computation of grades for Salettinians. Competitions and other activities including club participations are counted with corresponding points.

Participation	Activities
Choir	Sings every Thursday for weekly Eucharistic Celebration inside the Our Lady of La Salette Parish
Journalism	Contributes to the Informer(official school publication) articles such as Editorial, Poems, Feature and Special Reports every three months.
Performing Arts	Performs for special events inside the school, also members lead the school in competitions outside of the school. Members usually perform in the Auditorium and Quadrangle for special performances. This include Cheer Dancers, Folk Dancers, Pop Dancers and many more.
Savio	Joins and Assist the priest every Thursday for Eucharistic Celebration.
Sports Team	Members of the club lead the school for every sports competition like Volleyball, Basketball, Sepak Takraw, Softball and Tennis.
Drum and Lyre Corps	Members of the corps lead the school in Parade and special events. The official color is Silk Royal Blue with a Major Captain and Two Assisting Captain. Girls can be Majorette, play the xylophone or as flag bearer. Boys carry the Bass Drum or the Snare Drum.
Various Clubs	The clubs represents various subjects that interest the Salettinians. They also have destined bulletin for announcements and assigned rooms for meetings. Each club also has coordinators, usually teachers. Various clubs include Filipino Club, Recess Club, English Club, Math Club, Science Club and more.

=== Supreme Student Council ===
The Supreme Student Council is the student government inside the campus. A student must meet the requirements prescribed by Comelec in filing a candidacy for a desired position. The candidates are allowed to campaign but were given limited time. Campaign paraphernalia have to be located in the designated areas. The Student Council is determined by an election with voters comprising all students. Positions include president, vice president, treasurer and more.

=== Classroom officers ===
Each class are required to have their own officers to represent the class for school meetings organized by the President of the Supreme Student Council. The classroom officers are responsible for the wellness and peacefulness of the class. Officers also include president, vice president, secretary, treasurer and more.

== Prayers ==
There are many prayers done inside the school campus. Before a start of the daily Flag Ceremony, the Consecration to Our Lady of La Salette is prayed. The Prayer of Angelus is prayed on the school sound system which is a sign of the dismissal for the Morning class. The Memorare of Our Lady of La Salette is also played on school sound system as a mark for afternoon dismissal.

The La Salette Invocation

Our Lady of La Salette, Reconciler of sinners, pray without ceasing for us who have recourse to you

The prayer for the Consecration to Our lady of La Salette is as follows:

Most holy Mother, I consecrate myself to you without reserve. From this day, I will be your obedient child. May I so live as to dry your tears and console your afflicted heart. Beloved Mother, today and every day, and for the hour of my death, I consecrate myself to you, body and soul, every hope and every joy, every trouble and every sorrow, my life and my life's end. 0 dearest Mother, enlighten my understanding, that I may avoid all errors and sins, that I may walk with courage in the paths traced out for me by you and your Son. Amen.

The Memorare of Our Lady of La Salette is as follows:

Remember, Our Lady of La Salette, true Mother of Sorrows, the tears you shed for us on Calvary. Remember also the care you have taken to keep us faithful to Christ, your Son. Having done so much for your children, you will not now abandon us. Comforted by this consoling thought, we come to you pleading, despite our infidelities and ingratitude. Virgin of Reconciliation, do not reject our prayers, but intercede for us, obtain for us the grace to love Jesus above all else. May we console you by living a holy life and so come to share the eternal life Christ gained by his cross. Amen.

== School emblem ==
The school emblem is a round logo with the name of the school, La Salette of Roxas across the circumference. Below is the city address, Roxas, Isabela.

At the center of the school emblem lies the La Salette Cross. The La Salette cross is worn by the Blessed Virgin Mary, was unusual because it has a hammer and pincer. The hammer symbolizes the sinner nailing Jesus on the cross by human sins and the pincer represents the humanity trying to remove the nails from the cross by our virtuous life and fidelity to Jesus. This cross was seen hanging on a chain around the neck of the Blessed Virgin.

Below the cross lies the motto of the school, Pro deo et Patria, an Italian phrase meaning For God and Country.

== Celebrations ==
La Salette of Roxas celebrates many occasions within a school year. Some of these are:

=== Intamurals ===
The intramurals or sports intramurals are usually celebrated every July. It is a one-day celebration starting with a Celebration of the Holy Eucharist and a parade around the town led by the school drum and lyre corps. The celebration starts in the morning and ends in the afternoon. Sports is the center of this celebration with the opposing teams compete with each other on different sport events such as basketball, volleyball, softball, sepak takraw and badminton.

The intramural sports programs are often organized on the campus to promote competition and fun among the students. In the afternoon, unfinished games and categories are continued on the celebration of the Foundation Day.

=== Foundation Day ===
The celebration of the foundation starts every September 16 and ends on September 19 marking the anniversary of the apparition of Our Lady of La Salette. Foundation Day is the most awaited event in a school year.

There are always four teams competing each other, the name of the teams always start with a representing color followed by a representing mascot depending on the yearly theme. Some of themes are gemstones, animals and more. Each team consists of one section from each year level.

The celebration starts with a Holy Mass and a parade led by the flag bearers and drum and lyre corps of the Elementary Department, in the middle, the drum and lyre corps of High School Department. It is participated by all students classified on teams. All are wearing their official colors. The parade also has floats from Elementary Department, and the float of the Blessed Virgin Mary. The parade also consists of the faculty and staff, and College Department usually at the end of the long parade.

The competitions are scheduled accordingly so all students have to watch every event. Some of the major competitions are folk dance, cheering competition, pop dancing competition and dancesport are always held in the school quadrangle. There are also singing competitions for solo and duo in the school auditorium.

In the literary competition, there is always a declamation, oration and extemporaneous speaking held in the auditorium.

There are also different booths during the Foundation Day Celebration, they are as follows:

- Jail Booth
- Dedication Booth
- Cinema Booth
- Videoke Booth
- Beer Booth
- Photo Booth

Sports competition is usually in the afternoon and are held in different parts of the school field. Winners of the final round are considered the champion for the said event. Awardings of trophies and medals are usually on the afternoon of September 19. The next day after the Foundation Day is considered a school holiday where some students are assigned for cleaning.

=== Buwan ng Wika ===
The Buwan ng Wika is always celebrated in schools in the Philippines every August. The school promotes the usage of Filipino in the school campus during this month. At the last week of August, competitions are always held. Some of these are slogan making contest, poster making contest, Paglikha ng Tula at Mga Awitin.

The yearly Sabayang Pagbigkas Competition is also held. Participants are Section A Classes from each year level.

=== Nutrition Month ===
Every July, La Salette of Roxas celebrates Nutrition Month. During the last week of celebration, there are also slogan and poster making contests with a theme about nutrition. There is also a cooking competition held at the TLE Building, same as to catering competition and flower arranging competition.

=== Others ===
- English Week

This promotes usage of English language. Students caught speaking in Tagalog will be given corresponding punishments. Competitions are also held same as to Buwan ng Wika. This is being celebrated last week of January.

- Rosary Month

This is celebrated every October. Students are required to light candles on the Rosary Garden. Programs such as Prayer offering are held.

- Belen

During the month of December, students have to donate goods like used underwear, toys and basic commodities. Each section must earn their goods and they are being counted weekly with corresponding points. The section with the highest value of donations every week are announced during the Flag ceremony and earn extra rice. The earned goods are donated on Christmas Day to people of remote areas in the town.

== Class ==
=== High school ===
Year Level	Sections	Specific Subject Matter
First Year	St. Mark; St. Matthew; St. Luke; St. John; St. Paul	Algebra, Integrated Science, Earth Science, Basic Computer, Physical Education I, English I, Filipino I, MAPEH, Ibong Adarna, Philippine History and Civilization, Religion
Second Year	St. Justine; St. Ambrose; St. Augustine; St. John; St. Jerome	College Algebra, Advanced Computer, Physical Education II, Filipino II, English II, TLE, MAPEH II, Florante at Laura, Asian History and Civilization, Religion
Third Year	St. Thomas Aquinas; St. Anthony of Padua; St. Bonaventure	Geometry, Chemistry, Computer, TLE, MAPEH III, English III, Filipino III with Noli Me Tangere, World History and Civilization, Religion
Fourth Year	St. Francis of Assisi; St. Ignatius of Loyola; St. Lorenzo Ruiz	Calculus, Physics, TLE, MAPEH IV, Speech, Filipino IV with El Filibusterismo, Economics, Religion

== Christian Formation ==
La Salette of Roxas offers education not only in academics but also in yearning the youth to Christian Values that is why an added subject "Religion" is in the curriculum from pre-school to college. The person teaching the subject can only be either a priest or a nun. However, most of the time, the Sisters or Brothers from the congregation (Missionaries of Our Lady Of La Salette) get the position in teaching and leading Christian Formation Program.

Before, religion classes take part on sending Salettinians to Elementary Schools in Roxas, Isabela to teach the word of God once a week. This is often referred to as catechism and students teaching the word of God is called a catechist. But in 2005, the catechism was stopped by the school due to public demand.

=== Recollection and Retreat ===
Students enrolled in La Salette of Roxas are required to attend the scheduled Recollection. Various activities are done by the students and the attending priest or a brother. There is also a celebration of Holy Mass and Confession by the Sacrament of Penance. The Recollection is usually done in the school chapel or inside the Building II. The Retreat, on the other hand can only be done by the fourth year students. Retreat is usually on the months of January or February where fourth-year students stay in the National Shrine of Our Lady of La Salette in Silang, Cavite which is a 16-hour trip from Roxas, Isabela. The students engage in spiritual exercises for one week, and connect themselves to God. The purpose of this is for the students to reconnect with God through prayer and meditation. However, the students can tour the whole compound of the shrine which is considered the largest Shrine of Our Lady of La Salette.

== See also ==
- La Salette of Quezon
- University of La Salette
