= Legislative districts of Isabela =

Legislative district of the Philippines

The legislative districts of Isabela are the representations of the province of Isabela and the independent component city of Santiago in the various national legislatures of the Philippines. The province and the city are currently represented in the lower house of the Congress of the Philippines through their first, second, third, fourth, fifth, and sixth congressional districts.

== History ==
The province was represented as a lone legislative district until 1972. It was part of the representation of Region II from 1978 to 1984, and from 1984 to 1986, it elected 3 assemblymen at-large. In 1986, it was redistricted into four legislative districts.

On September 27, 2018, President Rodrigo Duterte signed Republic Act No. 11080, increasing the legislative districts from four to six and reapportioned the district assignments of cities and municipalities.

== Current districts ==
The province was last redistricted on September 27, 2018, where the fifth and sixth districts were apportioned. All six representatives are part of the majority bloc in the 20th Congress.

Political parties

PFP (4)
Lakas–CMD (2)

Legislative districts and representatives of Isabela
District	Current Representative		Party	Constituent LGUs	Population (2020)	Area	Map
District	Image	Name	Party	Constituent LGUs	Population (2020)	Area	Map
1st		Antonio T. Albano (since 2019); Cabagan	PFP	List: Cabagan; Delfin Albano; Divilacan; Ilagan; Maconacon; San Pablo; Santa Maria; Santo Tomas; Tumauini	399,196	4519.71 km²	
2nd		Ed Christopher S. Go (since 2019); San Mariano	PFP	List: Benito Soliven; Gamu; Naguilian; Palanan; Reina Mercedes; San Mariano	199,903	2890.49 km²	
3rd		Ian Paul L. Dy (since 2019); Alicia	Lakas	List: Alicia; Angadanan; Cabatuan; Ramon; San Mateo	282,027	686.27 km²	
4th		Joseph S. Tan (since 2022); Santiago	PFP	List: Cordon; Dinapigue; Jones; San Agustin; Santiago (Note: Independent component city since July 4, 1994. Independent from the province and does not vote for provincial officials by virtue of Republic Act No. 7720. Only votes with Isabela for congressional representation.)	268,602	1922.44 km²	
5th		Faustino Michael Carlos T. Dy III (since 2019); San Manuel	Lakas	List: Aurora; Burgos; Luna; Mallig; Quezon; Quirino; Roxas; San Manuel	267,550	981.43 km²	
6th		Faustino D. Dy III (since 2025); Cauayan	PFP	List: Cauayan; Echague; San Guillermo; San Isidro	279,772	1414.59 km²	

== Historical districts ==
=== Four districts (1987–2019) ===
==== 1st district ====
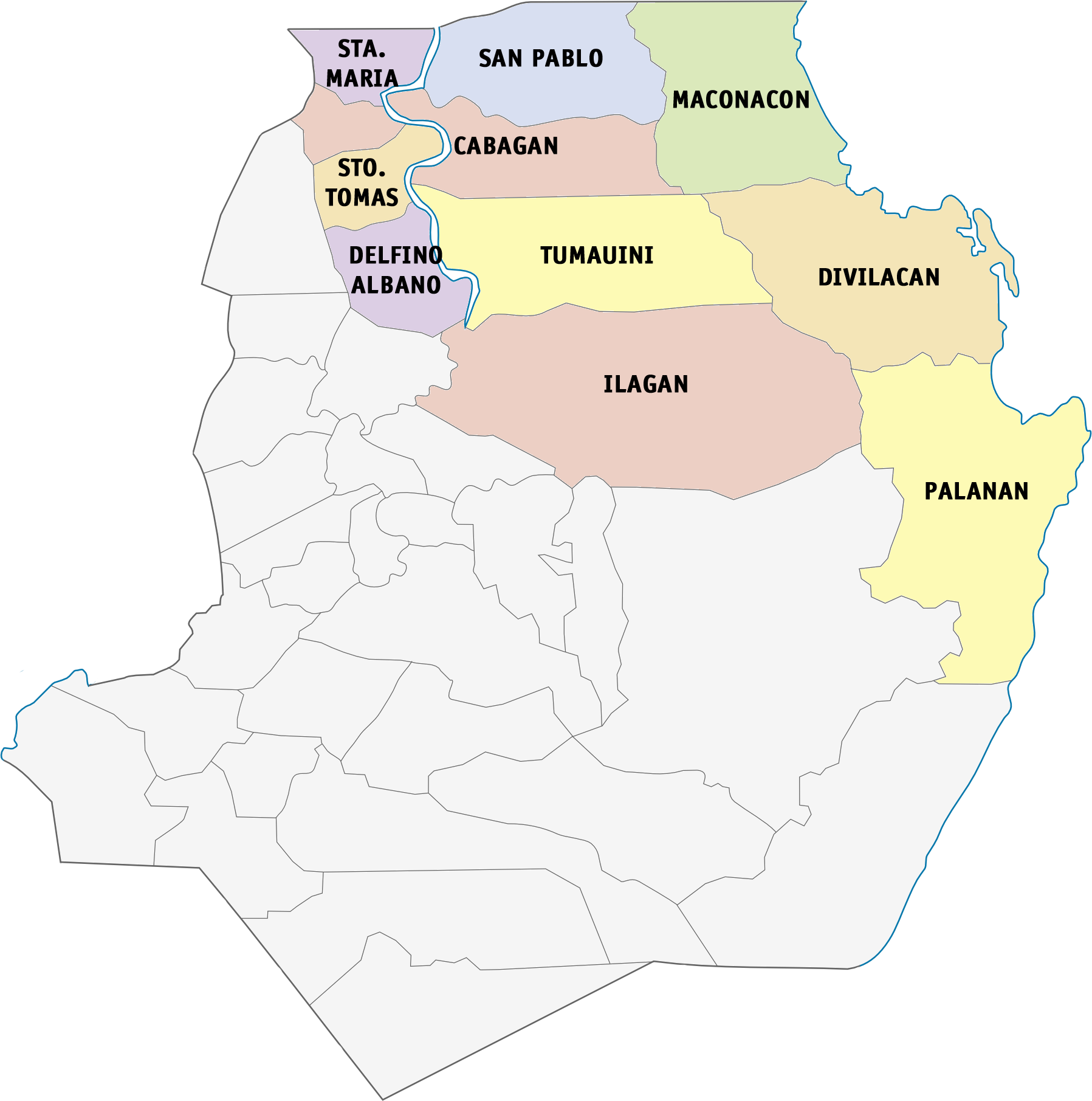
Map of Isabela's First District (1987-2019)

- City: Ilagan (became a city in 2012)
- Municipalities: Cabagan, Delfin Albano, Divilacan, Maconacon, Palanan, San Pablo, Santa Maria, Santo Tomas, Tumauini

Period	Representative
8th Congress; 1987–1992	Rodolfo B. Albano, Jr.
9th Congress; 1992–1995	Rodolfo B. Albano, Jr.
10th Congress; 1995–1998	Rodolfo B. Albano, Jr.
11th Congress; 1998–2001	Rodolfo T. Albano III
12th Congress; 2001–2004	Rodolfo B. Albano, Jr.
13th Congress; 2004–2007	Rodolfo T. Albano III
14th Congress; 2007–2010	Rodolfo T. Albano III
15th Congress; 2010–2013	Rodolfo B. Albano, Jr.
16th Congress; 2013–2016	Rodolfo T. Albano III
17th Congress; 2016–2019	Rodolfo T. Albano III

==== 2nd district ====
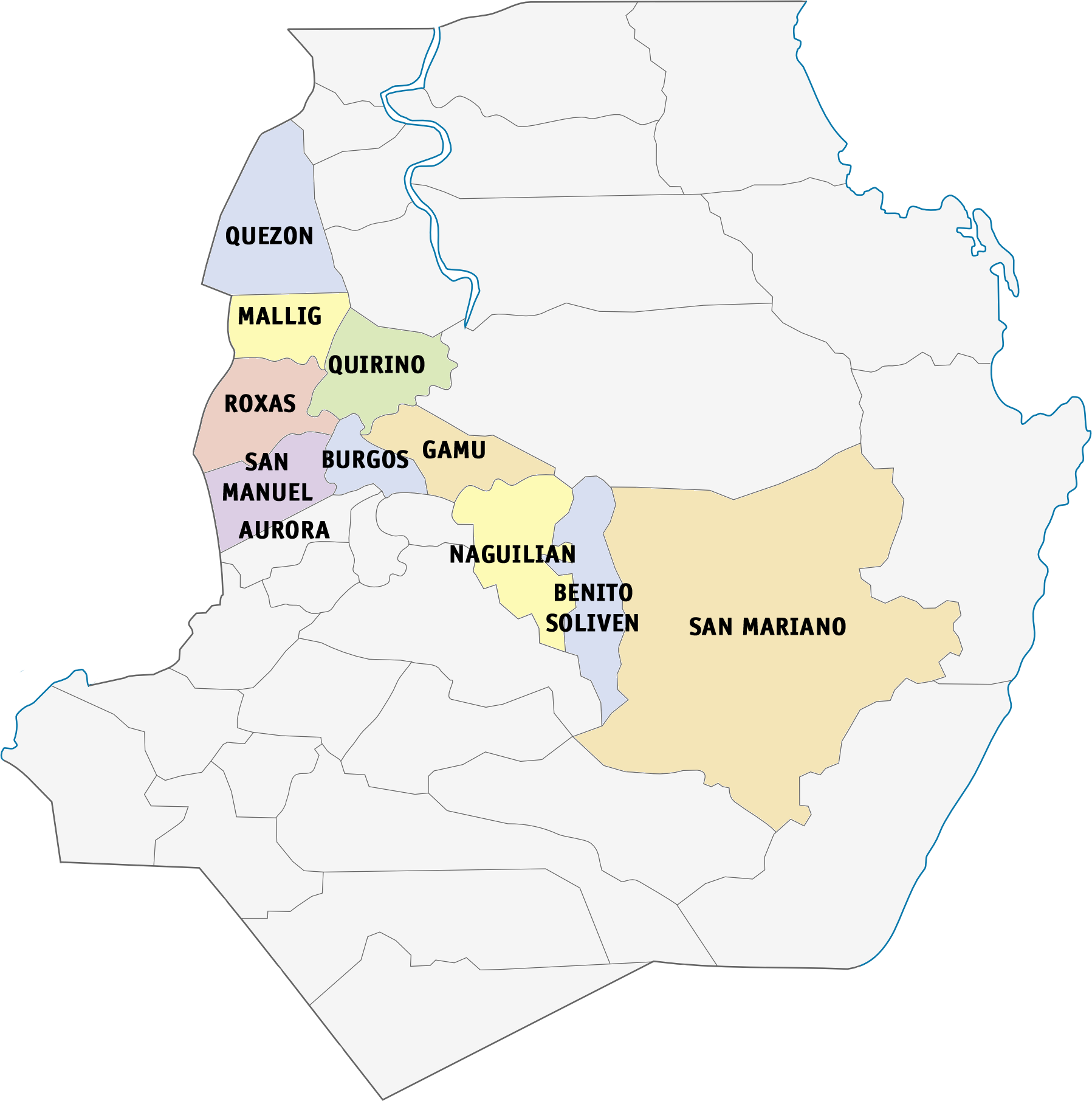
Map of Isabela's Second District (1987-2019)

- Municipalities: Aurora, Benito Soliven, Burgos, Gamu, Mallig, Naguilian, Quezon, Quirino, Roxas, San Manuel, San Mariano

Period	Representative
8th Congress; 1987–1992	Simplicio B. Domingo, Jr.
9th Congress; 1992–1995	Faustino S. Dy, Jr.
10th Congress; 1995–1998	Faustino S. Dy, Jr.
11th Congress; 1998–2001	Faustino S. Dy, Jr.
12th Congress; 2001–2004	Edwin C. Uy
13th Congress; 2004–2007	Edwin C. Uy
14th Congress; 2007–2010	Edwin C. Uy
15th Congress; 2010–2013	Ana Cristina S. Go
16th Congress; 2013–2016	Ana Cristina S. Go
17th Congress; 2016–2019	Ana Cristina S. Go

==== 3rd district ====
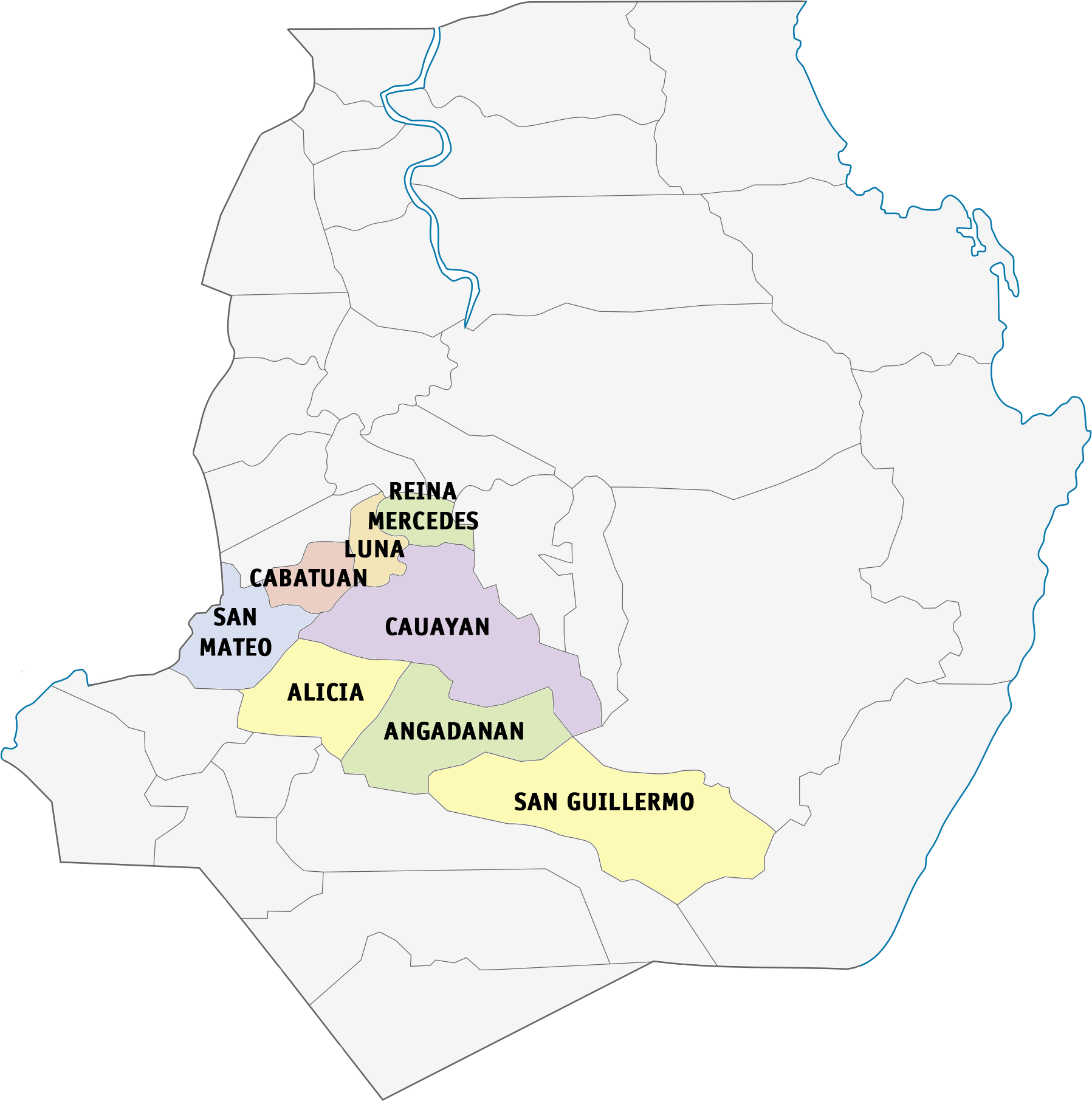
Map of Isabela's Third District (1987-2019)

- City: Cauayan (became a city in 2001)
- Municipalities: Alicia, Angadanan, Cabatuan, Luna, Reina Mercedes, San Guillermo, San Mateo

Period	Representative
8th Congress; 1987–1992	Santiago P. Respicio
9th Congress; 1992–1995	Santiago P. Respicio
10th Congress; 1995–1998	Santiago P. Respicio
11th Congress; 1998–2001	Ramon M. Reyes
12th Congress; 2001–2004	Faustino G. Dy III
13th Congress; 2004–2007	Faustino G. Dy III
14th Congress; 2007–2010	Faustino G. Dy III
15th Congress; 2010–2013	Napoleon S. Dy
16th Congress; 2013–2016	Napoleon S. Dy
17th Congress; 2016–2019	Napoleon S. Dy

==== 4th district ====
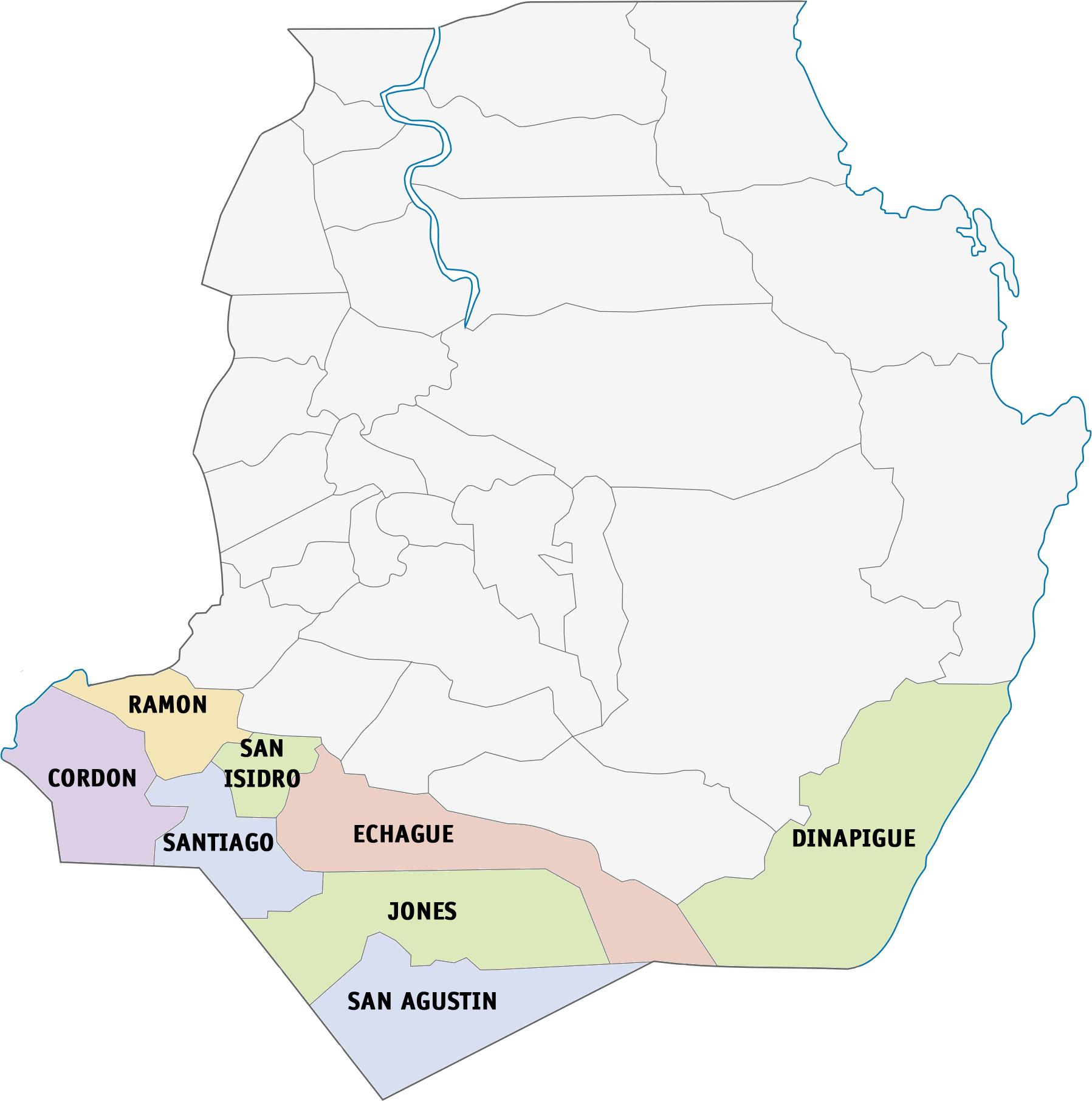
Map of Isabela's Fourth District (1987-2019)

- City: Santiago (became a city in 1994)
- Municipalities: Cordon, Dinapigue, Echague, Jones, Ramon, San Agustin, San Isidro

Period	Representative
8th Congress; 1987–1992	Antonio M. Abaya
9th Congress; 1992–1995	Antonio M. Abaya
10th Congress; 1995–1998	Antonio M. Abaya
11th Congress; 1998–2001	Heherson Alvarez
12th Congress; 2001–2004	Antonio M. Abaya (Note: Died on February 26, 2003.)
12th Congress; 2001–2004	Giorgidi Aggabao (Note: Elected to complete the unexpired term of predecessor, assumed office on May 19, 2003.)
13th Congress; 2004–2007	Anthony Miranda
14th Congress; 2007–2010	Giorgidi Aggabao
15th Congress; 2010–2013	Giorgidi Aggabao
16th Congress; 2013–2016	Giorgidi Aggabao
17th Congress; 2016–2019	Ma. Lourdes R. Aggabao

=== Lone district (defunct) ===
Period	Representative
1st Philippine Legislature; 1907–1909	Nicasio Claravall (Note: Unseated by the Assembly.)
1st Philippine Legislature; 1907–1909	Dimas Guzman
2nd Philippine Legislature; 1909–1912	Eliseo Claravall
3rd Philippine Legislature; 1912–1916	Eliseo Claravall
4th Philippine Legislature; 1916–1919	Mauro Verzosa
5th Philippine Legislature; 1919–1922	Miguel Binag
6th Philippine Legislature; 1922–1925	Tolentino Verzosa
7th Philippine Legislature; 1925–1928	Manuel Nieto
8th Philippine Legislature; 1928–1931	Pascual Paguirigan
9th Philippine Legislature; 1931–1934	Silvestre Macutay
10th Philippine Legislature; 1934–1935	Silvino Gumpal
1st National Assembly; 1935–1938	Mauro Verzosa
2nd National Assembly; 1938–1941	Mauro Verzosa
1st Commonwealth Congress; 1945	Lino J. Castillejos
1st Congress; 1946–1949	Domingo Paguirigan
2nd Congress; 1949–1953	Samuel Reyes
3rd Congress; 1953–1957	Samuel Reyes
4th Congress; 1957–1961	Delfin B. Albano
5th Congress; 1961–1965	Delfin B. Albano
6th Congress; 1965–1969	Melanio Singson
7th Congress; 1969–1972	Rodolfo B. Albano, Jr.

=== At-Large (defunct) ===
==== 1943–1944 ====
Period	Representative
National Assembly; 1943–1944	Lino J. Castillejos
National Assembly; 1943–1944	Gregorio P. Formoso

==== 1984–1986 ====
Period	Representative
Regular Batasang Pambansa; 1984–1986	Rodolfo B. Albano, Jr.
Regular Batasang Pambansa; 1984–1986	Prospero G. Bello
Regular Batasang Pambansa; 1984–1986	Simplicio B. Domingo, Jr.
