= San Manuel, Isabela =

Municipality in Isabela, Philippines

San Manuel Callang
- Municipality
- Municipality of San Manuel
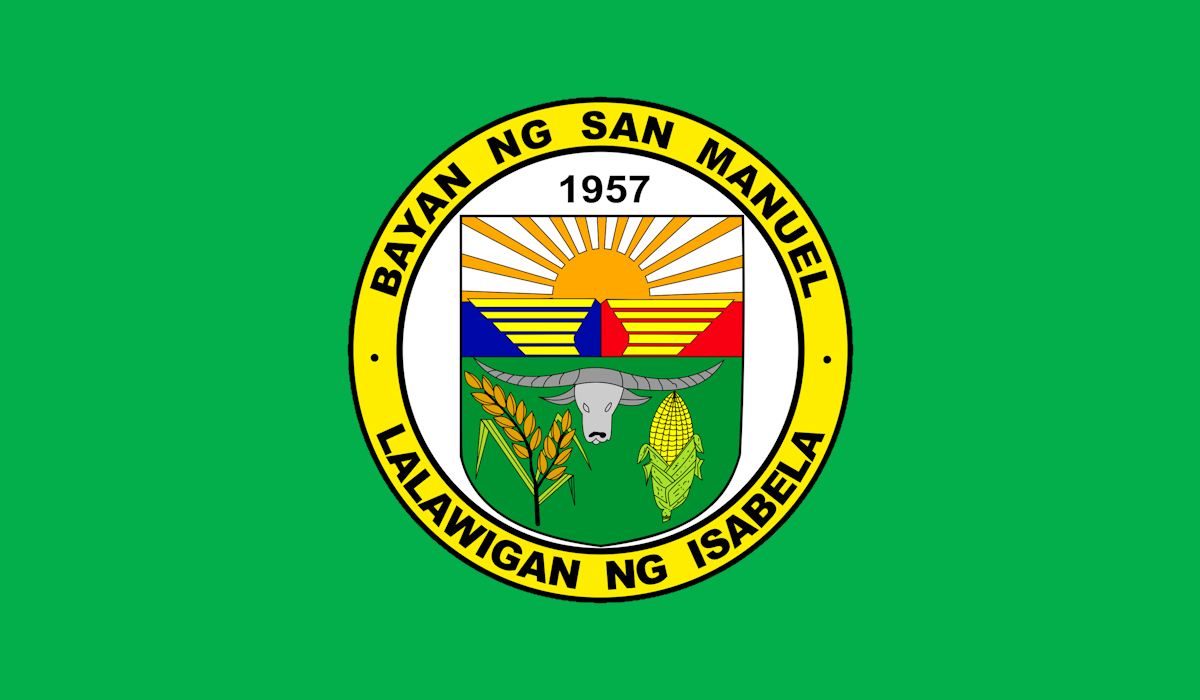
- Flag Seal

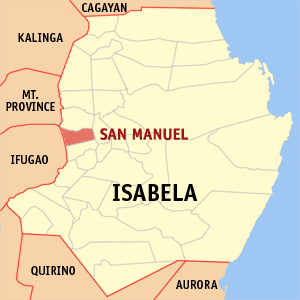
- Map of Isabela with San Manuel highlighted
- Interactive map of San Manuel
- Location within the Philippines
- Coordinates: 17°01′N 121°38′E
- Country: Philippines
- Region: Cagayan Valley
- Province: Isabela
- District: 5th district
- Founded: June 23, 1957 (as Callang)
- Renamed: June 19, 1965 (as San Manuel)
- Barangays: 19 (see Barangays)

Government
  - Type: Sangguniang Bayan
  - Mayor: Faustino "Dondon" Dy IV
  - Vice Mayor: Temestocles A. Santos Jr.
  - Representative: Faustino Michael Carlos T. Dy III
  - Electorate: 21,089 voters (2025)

Area
  - Total: 112.77 km^{2} (43.54 sq mi)
- Elevation: 65 m (213 ft)
- Highest elevation: 97 m (318 ft)
- Lowest elevation: 49 m (161 ft)

Population (2024 census)
  - Total: 34,740
  - Density: 308.1/km^{2} (797.9/sq mi)
  - Households: 8,714

Economy
  - Income class: 2nd municipal income class
  - Poverty incidence: 11.63% (2023)
  - Revenue: ₱ 185.9 million (2024)
  - Assets: ₱ 688.3 million (2024)
  - Expenditure: ₱ 191.8 million (2024)
  - Liabilities: ₱ 208.7 million (2024)

Service provider
  - Electricity: Isabela 2 Electric Cooperative (ISELCO 2)
- Time zone: UTC+8 (PST)
- ZIP code: 3317
- PSGC: 0203130000
- IDD : area code: +63 (0)78
- Native languages: Ilocano; Tagalog
- Website: sanmanuelisabela.gov.ph

San Manuel (formerly Callang), officially the Municipality of San Manuel (Ilocano: Ili ti San Manuel; Tagalog: Bayan ng San Manuel), is a municipality in the province of Isabela, Philippines. According to the 2024 census, it has a population of 34,740 people.

== Etymology ==
The name of the town is believed to have come from “Callang,” a native Kalinga word for the hardwood molave tree, a material long used by the Kalingas.

== History ==
In the early 1920s, the initial groups of settlers from Central Luzon came and founded communities in the area. At that time, Callang was a barrio of the municipality of Gamu. After gaining independence from Gamu in 1948, Roxas (formerly Barrio Vera) became a municipality. One of the barrios of this recently established municipality was Callang. Before 1957, Callang's leaders petitioned for the barrio to become a municipality because of the town's rapid progress. Congressman Delfin B. Albano's bill was approved by Congress. The area had 14,650 residents and earned ₱65,000 annually at the time.

In June 23, 1957, the barrios of Callang, Eden, Babanuang, Cabaritan, Santa Cruz, Malalinta, Mararigue, Calaocan, and Caraniogan of Roxas were separated to form Callang. The municipality was inaugurated on October 12, 1957 with the barangay of Callang as the government seat. In June 19, 1965, the town was renamed as San Manuel by virtue of Republic Act No. 4600. By virtue of Republic Act No. 5869, the barrios of Villanueva and Sandiat in the Municipality of Roxas were made part of San Manuel.

== Geography ==
San Manuel is situated 40.25 kilometres (25.01 mi) from the provincial capital Ilagan, and 404.17 kilometres (251.14 mi) from the country's capital city of Manila.

=== Barangays ===
San Manuel is politically subdivided into 19 barangays. Each barangay consists of puroks while some have sitios.

- Agliam
- Babanuang
- Cabaritan
- Caraniogan
- Eden
- Malalinta
- Mararigue
- Nueva Era
- Pisang
- District 1 (Poblacion)
- District 2 (Poblacion)
- District 3 (Poblacion)
- District 4 (Poblacion)
- San Francisco
- Sandiat Centro
- Sandiat East
- Sandiat West
- Santa Cruz
- Villanueva

=== Climate ===
Climate data for San Manuel, Isabela
Month	Jan	Feb	Mar	Apr	May	Jun	Jul	Aug	Sep	Oct	Nov	Dec	Year
Mean daily maximum °C (°F)	25 (77)	27 (81)	29 (84)	32 (90)	33 (91)	33 (91)	32 (90)	31 (88)	31 (88)	29 (84)	28 (82)	26 (79)	30 (85)
Mean daily minimum °C (°F)	19 (66)	19 (66)	20 (68)	22 (72)	24 (75)	24 (75)	23 (73)	23 (73)	23 (73)	22 (72)	22 (72)	21 (70)	22 (71)
Average precipitation mm (inches)	97.5 (3.84)	75.6 (2.98)	84 (3.3)	114.7 (4.52)	226.6 (8.92)	185.4 (7.30)	294 (11.6)	266.6 (10.50)	279.2 (10.99)	307.6 (12.11)	205 (8.1)	211.9 (8.34)	2,348.1 (92.5)
Average rainy days	6	6	7	10	14	15	20	21	19	14	12	11	155
Source: World Weather Online

== Demographics ==
Population census of San Manuel
Year	Pop.	±% p.a.
1960	6,525	—
1970	11,309	+5.65%
1975	14,535	+5.16%
1980	17,968	+4.33%
1990	24,620	+3.20%
1995	25,527	+0.68%
2000	27,059	+1.26%
2007	28,420	+0.68%
2010	30,407	+2.49%
2015	31,896	+0.91%
2020	34,085	+1.41%
2024	34,740	+0.46%
Source: Philippine Statistics Authority

In the 2024 census, the population of San Manuel was 34,740 people, with a density of 310 inhabitants per square kilometre or 800 inhabitants per square mile.

== Economy ==
Poverty incidence of San Manuel (%)

Source: Philippine Statistics Authority

The town's primary economic activity is farming.

== Government ==
=== Local government ===
As a municipality in the Province of Isabela, government officials at the provincial and municipal levels are voted by the town. The provincial government has political jurisdiction over most local transactions of the municipal government.

The Municipality of San Manuel is governed by a mayor, designated as its local chief executive, and by a municipal council as its legislative body in accordance with the Local Government Code. The mayor, vice mayor, and the municipal councilors are elected directly through polls held every three years.

Barangays are also headed by elected officials: Barangay Captain, Barangay Council, whose members are called Barangay Councilors. The barangays have SK federation which represents the barangay, headed by SK chairperson and whose members are called SK councilors. All officials are also elected every three years.

List of Municipal Mayors (1965–present)
Year	Name	Remarks
1965–1967	Mariano Bala Garcia	First Appointed Mayor
1967	Agaton Julian Salvador	First Elected Mayor
1968–1971	Paulino Apostol Domingo	First term
1971	Fermin A. Santiago	
1972–1980	Paulino Apostol Domingo	Second term
1980–1986	Paulino Apostol Domingo	Third term
1986–1987	Fermin A. Santiago	
1987–1988	Potenciano Custodio Marasigan	
1988–1992	Paulino Apostol Domingo	Fourth and final term
1992–1993	Jaime Halili Domingo	First term
1993–1995	Reynaldo Padolina Abesamis	First term
1995–1998	Jaime Halili Domingo	Second term
1998–2001	Jaime Halili Domingo	Third term
2001–2004	Reynaldo Padolina Abesamis	Second term
2004–2007	Jaime Halili Domingo	Fourth and final term
2007–2010	Reynaldo Padolina Abesamis	Third and final term
2010–2013	Faustino Michael Carlos "Mike" T. Dy III	First term
2013–2016	Faustino Michael Carlos "Mike" T. Dy III	Second term
2016–2019	Faustino Michael Carlos "Mike" T. Dy III	Third and final term
2019–2022	Manuel Faustino "King" U. Dy	
2022–2025	Faustino "Dondon" U. Dy IV	First term
2025–present	Faustino "Dondon" U. Dy IV	Second term

=== Elected officials ===
Members of the San Manuel Municipal Council (2022-2025)
Position	Name
District Representative	Faustino Michael Carlos T. Dy III
Municipal Mayor	Faustino U. Dy, IV.
Municipal Vice-Mayor	Temestocles A. Santos, Jr.
Municipal Councilors	Richmond C. Ventura
Municipal Councilors	Rosevel Cabrera
Municipal Councilors	Raphil Ignacio
Municipal Councilors	Emelito B. Velasco
Municipal Councilors	Eufemio S. Ramos, Jr.
Municipal Councilors	Leslie Abad
Municipal Councilors	Cristopher A. Balbas
Municipal Councilors	Jo-Mark D. Mateo

=== Congress representation ===
San Manuel, belonging to the fifth legislative district of the province of Isabela, currently represented by Faustino Michael Carlos T. Dy III.

== Education ==
The Schools Division of Isabela governs the town's public education system. The division office is a field office of the DepEd in Cagayan Valley region. The San Manuel Schools District Office governs all public and private elementary and high schools throughout the municipality.

=== Primary and elementary schools ===
- Agliam Primary School
- Asinan Elementary School
- Babanuang Elementary School
- Cabaritan Elementary School
- Caraniogan Elementary School
- Eden Integrated School
- Malalinta Elementary School
- Mananao Elementary School
- Mararigue Elementary School
- Nueva Era Elementary School
- Pisang Elementary School
- San Francisco Elementary School
- San Manuel Central School
- San Manuel United Methodist Nursery - Kindergarten School
- Sandiat Elementary School
- Sandiat West Elementary School
- Villa Cayaban Elementary School
- Villanueva Elementary School

=== Secondary schools ===
- Callang National High School
- Malalinta National High School
- Nueva Era National High School
- Sandiat National High School
- Sta. Cruz Integrated School
- Our Lady of the Pillar College - San Manuel

== See also ==
- List of renamed cities and municipalities in the Philippines
