= Aurora, Isabela =

Municipality in Isabela, Philippines

Aurora
- Municipality
- Municipality of Aurora
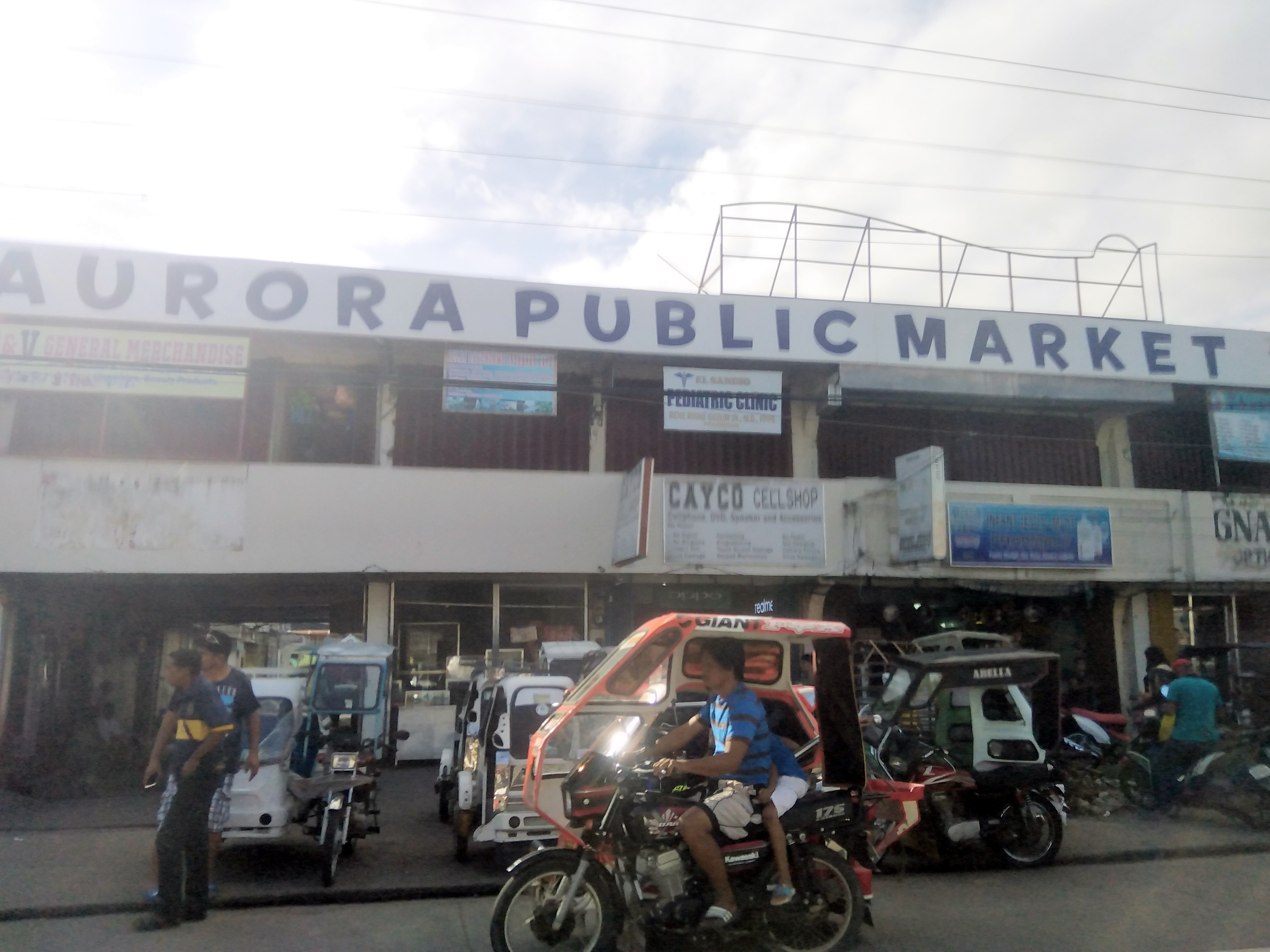
- Aurora, Isabela Public Market

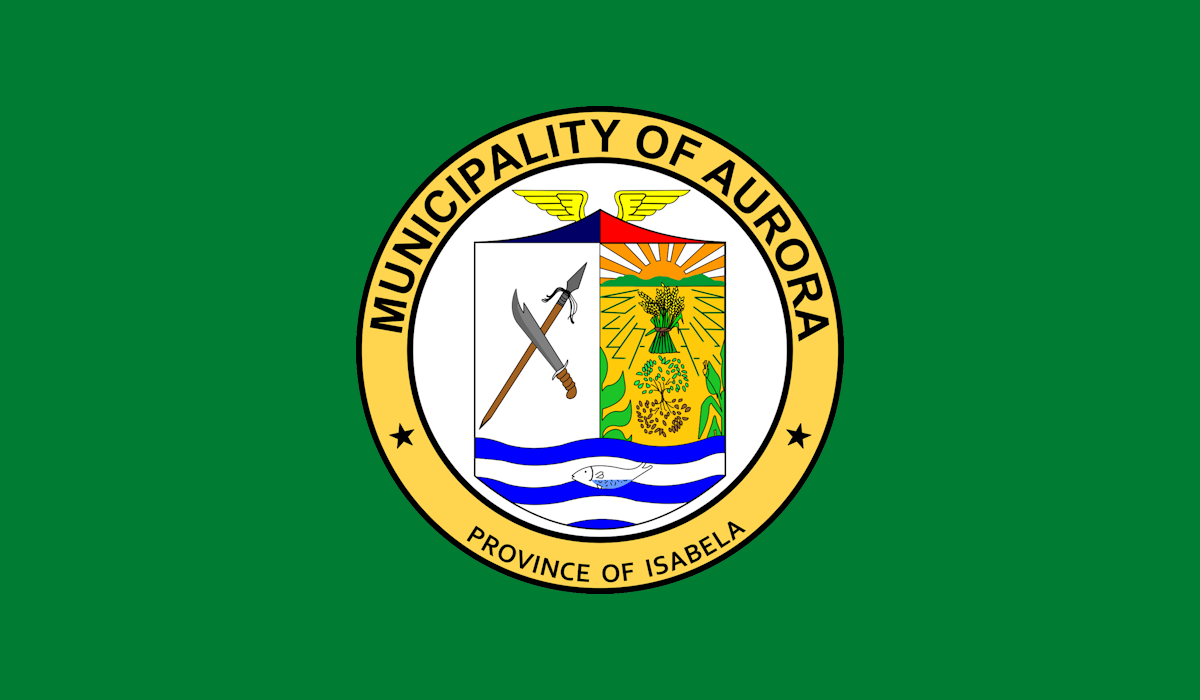
- Flag
- Nickname: Former Commercial Center of the Mallig Plains Region
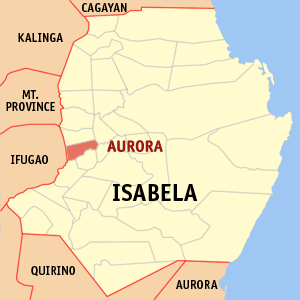
- Map of Isabela with Aurora highlighted
- Interactive map of Aurora
- Location within the Philippines
- Coordinates: 16°59′31″N 121°38′08″E
- Country: Philippines
- Region: Cagayan Valley
- Province: Isabela
- District: 5th district
- Founded: July 3, 1948
- Named for: Aurora Quezon
- Barangays: 33 (see Barangays)

Government
  - Type: Sangguniang Bayan
  - Mayor: Joseph Christian G. Uy
  - Vice Mayor: Melvin S. Martin
  - Representative: Faustino Michael Carlos T. Dy III
  - Electorate: 24,521 voters (2025)

Area
  - Total: 115.56 km^{2} (44.62 sq mi)
- Elevation: 62 m (203 ft)
- Highest elevation: 90 m (300 ft)
- Lowest elevation: 47 m (154 ft)

Population (2024 census)
  - Total: 37,191
  - Density: 321.83/km^{2} (833.54/sq mi)
  - Households: 9,471

Economy
  - Income class: 1st municipal income class
  - Poverty incidence: 10.22% (2023)
  - Revenue: ₱ 53.67 million (2024)
  - Assets: ₱ 1,556 million (2024)
  - Expenditure: ₱ 249.6 million (2024)
  - Liabilities: ₱ 442.6 million (2024)

Service provider
  - Electricity: Isabela 2 Electric Cooperative (ISELCO 2)
- Time zone: UTC+8 (PST)
- ZIP code: 3316
- PSGC: 0203103000
- IDD : area code: +63 (0)78
- Native languages: Ilocano; Tagalog
- Website: www.aurora-isabela.gov.ph

Aurora, officially the Municipality of Aurora (Ilocano: Ili ti Aurora; Tagalog: Bayan ng Aurora), is a municipality in the province of Isabela, Philippines. According to the 2024 census, it has a population of 37,191 people.

== History ==
On July 3, 1948, President Elpidio Quirino issued Executive Order No. 139, establishing Aurora as a municipality.

== Geography ==
Aurora is 40 kilometres (25 mi) south of the provincial capital Ilagan, and 400 kilometres (250 mi) north of capital Manila.

=== Barangays ===
Aurora is politically subdivided into 33 barangays. Each barangay consists of puroks while some have sitios.

It became a municipal district on August 27, 1927. Only one barangay is considered urban (highlighted in bold).

- Apiat
- Bagnos
- Bagong Tanza
- Ballesteros
- Bannagao
- Bannawag
- Bolinao
- Santo Niño (Caipilan)
- Camarunggayan
- Dalig-Kalinga
- Diamantina (Palacol)
- Divisoria
- Esperanza East
- Esperanza West
- Kalabaza
- Rizalina (Lapuz)
- Macatal
- Malasin
- Nampicuan
- Villa Nuesa
- Panecien
- San Andres
- San Jose (Poblacion)
- San Rafael
- San Ramon
- Santa Rita
- Santa Rosa (Poblacion)
- Saranay
- Sili
- Victoria
- Villa Fugu
- San Juan (Poblacion)
- **San Pedro-San Pablo (Poblacion)**

=== Climate ===
Climate data for Aurora, Isabela
Month	Jan	Feb	Mar	Apr	May	Jun	Jul	Aug	Sep	Oct	Nov	Dec	Year
Mean daily maximum °C (°F)	31 (88)	31 (88)	32 (90)	34 (93)	35 (95)	34 (93)	32 (90)	32 (90)	32 (90)	32 (90)	32 (90)	31 (88)	32 (90)
Mean daily minimum °C (°F)	22 (72)	22 (72)	22 (72)	24 (75)	24 (75)	24 (75)	24 (75)	24 (75)	24 (75)	23 (73)	23 (73)	22 (72)	23 (74)
Average precipitation mm (inches)	13.6 (0.54)	10.4 (0.41)	18.2 (0.72)	15.7 (0.62)	178.4 (7.02)	227.9 (8.97)	368 (14.5)	306.6 (12.07)	310.6 (12.23)	215.7 (8.49)	70.3 (2.77)	31.1 (1.22)	1,766.5 (69.56)
Average rainy days	3	2	2	4	14	16	23	21	24	15	10	6	140
Source: World Weather Online

== Demographics ==
Population census of Aurora
Year	Pop.	±% p.a.
1939	3,185	—
1948	7,797	+10.46%
1960	13,797	+4.87%
1970	16,035	+1.51%
1975	18,337	+2.73%
1980	20,322	+2.08%
1990	24,903	+2.05%
1995	26,385	+1.09%
2000	28,836	+1.92%
2007	31,547	+1.25%
2010	33,045	+1.70%
2015	35,017	+1.11%
2020	36,621	+0.95%
2024	37,191	+0.37%
Source: Philippine Statistics Authority

In the 2024 census, the population of Aurora was 37,191 people, with a density of 320 inhabitants per square kilometre or 830 inhabitants per square mile.

== Economy ==
Poverty incidence of Aurora

Source: Philippine Statistics Authority

== Government ==
=== Local government ===
As a municipality in the Province of Isabela, government officials in the provincial and municipal levels are voted by the town. The provincial government has political jurisdiction over most local transactions of the municipal government.

The municipality of Aurora is governed by a mayor, designated as its local chief executive, and by a municipal council as its legislative body in accordance with the Local Government Code. The mayor, vice mayor, and the municipal councilors are elected directly by the people through an election held every three years.

Barangays are also headed by elected officials: Barangay Captain, Barangay Council, whose members are called Barangay Councilors. The barangays have SK federation which represents the barangay, headed by SK chairperson and whose members are called SK councilors. All officials are also elected every three years.

=== Elected officials ===
2025-2028 Aurora, Isabela Officials
Position	Name	Party
Municipal Mayor	Joseph Christian G. Uy	PFP
Municipal Vice Mayor	Romeo R. Torio	PFP
Municipal Councilors	Norman C. Alivia	PFP
Municipal Councilors	Manuel S. Rivera Jr.	Lakas
Municipal Councilors	Ana Paulina U. Casiano	PFP
Municipal Councilors	Melvin Rey A. Galingana	PFP
Municipal Councilors	Venelo L. Taguinod	Lakas
Municipal Councilors	Melvin S. Martin	PFP
Municipal Councilors	Giovanni M. Quiambao	PFP
Municipal Councilors	Reynaldo B. Dela Cruz	WPP
Ex Officio Municipal Council Members
ABC President	TBD	Nonpartisan
SK Federation President	TBD	Nonpartisan

=== Congress representation ===
Aurora, belonging to the fifth legislative district of the province of Isabela, currently represented by Hon. Faustino Michael Carlos T. Dy III.

== Education ==
The Schools Division of Isabela governs the town's public education system. The division office is a field office of the DepEd in Cagayan Valley region. The Aurora Schools District Office governs all educational institutions within the municipality. It oversees the management and operations of all private and public, from primary to secondary schools.

=== Primary and elementary schools ===
- Apiat Elementary School
- Aurora Central School
- Aurora Early Achievers Christian School
- Aurora United Methodist Church Learning Center
- Bagong Tanza Elementary School
- Ballesteros Elementary School
- Bannagao Elementary School
- Bannawag Elementary School
- Bolinao Elementary School
- Camarunggayan Elementary School
- Camarunggayan ES - Saranay PS
- Dalig Kalinga Elementary School
- Diamantina Elementary School
- Divisoria Elementary School
- Esperanza Elementary School (Main)
- Esperanza West PS (Annex)
- Kalabaza Elementary School
- La Salette of Aurora
- Loving Christ Smart School
- Macatal Elementary School
- Malasin Elementary School
- Nampicuan Elementary School
- Panecien Elementary School
- Rizalina Elementary School
- San Andres-Ramon Elementary School
- San Rafael Elementary School
- St. John + James Kiddie School
- Sta Rita Elementary School
- Sto. Niño Elementary School
- Victoria Elementary School
- Villa Nuesa Primary School

=== Secondary schools ===
- Aurora Senior High School
- Bagnos Integrated School
- Doña Aurora National High School
- Villa Fugu Integrated School
