= University of La Salette =

Roman Catholic university in Isabela, Philippines

- Former names: La Salette of Santiago (1951–1952); La Salette of Santiago College (1952–1998)
- Motto: Reconciliare (Latin)
- Motto in English: Reconciliation
- Type: Private Catholic Non-profit Coeducational Basic and Higher education institution
- Established: 1951; 75 years ago
- Founder: Missionaries of Our Lady of La Salette
- Religious affiliation: Roman Catholic (La Salettes)
- Academic affiliations: NCEA PAASCU PACUCOA
- President: Rev. Fr. Franklin G. Picio, MS, Ph.D.
- Vice-president: Rev. Fr. Pedro Q. Dolar, MS (VP for Administration); Madeilyn B. Estacio, Ph.D. (VP for Academics)
- Location: Santiago City, Isabela, Philippines; 16°41′31″N 121°32′24″E
- Campus: Urban
- Alma Mater Song: Reconciliare
- Colors: Blue and White
- Nickname: Salettinian
- Website: www.uls.edu.ph
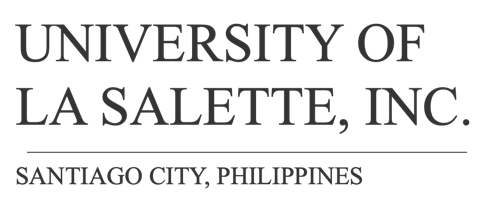

- Location in Luzon Location in the Philippines

The University of La Salette is a private Catholic, coeducational basic and higher education institution founded in 1951 and run by the Missionaries of Our Lady of La Salette in Santiago, Isabela, Philippines.

== History ==
The school was established in 1951 as a high school, with its college department being established in 1953. In 1970, the college department was moved from the high school campus to its present site. The college was upgraded into a university in 1998.

== Academic Programs ==
=== Graduate Programs ===
- Doctor in Business Administration
- Doctor in Public Administration
- Doctor of Philosophy in Educational Management
- Doctor of Philosophy in Education
  - Major in Science Education
- Master in Business Management
- Master of Arts in Education
  - Major in: English, Educational Management, Filipino, Mathematics, Guidance and Counseling, Science, Physical Education, Peace and Reconciliation Studies
- Master of Arts in Nursing
  - Major in: Nursing Service Administration
- Master of Science in Nursing
  - Major in: Community Health Nursing, Medical-Surgical Nursing, and Maternal & Child Nursing
- Master of Arts in Criminology
- Master of Science in Engineering Management
- Master of Science in Library and Information Science
- Master of Science in Public Health
- Master of Science in Social Work
- Master of Information Technology

=== College of Law ===
- Juris Doctor (Bachelor of Laws)

=== Undergraduate Programs ===
College of Accountancy

- Bachelor of Science in Accountancy
- Bachelor of Science in Accounting Information System

College of Arts and Sciences

- Bachelor of Arts in Political Science
- Bachelor of Arts in Journalism
- Bachelor of Arts in Philosophy
- Bachelor of Science in Psychology
- Bachelor of Science in Social Work

College of Business Education

- Bachelor of Science in Business Administration
  - Major in: Human Resources Management, Financial Management, Marketing Management
- Bachelor of Science in Office Administration
- Bachelor of Science in Hospitality Management
- Bachelor of Science in Tourism Management

College of Criminology

- Bachelor of Science in Criminology

College of Education

- Bachelor of Elementary Education
- Bachelor of Secondary Early Childhood Education
- Bachelor of Physical Education
- Bachelor of Secondary Education
  - Major in: English, Filipino, Mathematics, Sciences, and Social Studies

College of Engineering and Architecture

- Bachelor of Science in Civil Engineering
- Bachelor of Science in Electronics Engineering
- Bachelor of Science in Computer Engineering
- Bachelor of Science in Architecture
- Bachelor of Science in Geodetic Engineering

College of Information Technology

- Bachelor of Science in Information Technology
- Bachelor of Library and Information Science

College of Medicine and Allied Medical Programs

- Bachelor of Science in Medical Laboratory Science
- Bachelor of Science in Radiologic Technology
- Bachelor of Science in Pharmacy
- Bachelor of Science in Physical Therapy

College of Nursing, Public Health, and Midwifery

- Bachelor of Science in Nursing
- Bachelor of Science in Midwifery
- Bachelor of Science in Public Health

=== Basic Education ===
- Senior High
  - Grade 11
  - Grade 12
- Junior High
- Grade 1–6
- Kinder
- Nursery (Preschool)
