= Mike Dy III =

Filipino politician (born 1979)

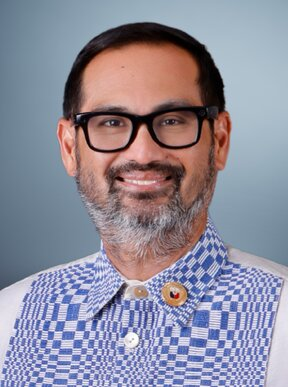
- Official portrait, 2025

Member of the House of Representatives from Isabela’s 5th District
- Incumbent
- Assumed office June 30, 2019
- Preceded by: District established

Mayor of San Manuel, Isabela
- In office June 30, 2010 – June 30, 2019
- Vice Mayor: Mario Napicog Sr. (2010–2016); Gloria Velasco (2016–2019)
- Preceded by: Reynaldo Abesamis
- Succeeded by: Manuel Faustino Dy

Personal details
- Born: Faustino Michael Carlos Tillmann Dy III; September 17, 1979 (age 46) Manila, Philippines
- Party: Lakas (2022–present)
- Other party: NPC (2009–2018; 2021–2022); PFP (2018–2021)
- Relatives: Bojie Dy (uncle); Inno Dy (first cousin); Ian Paul Dy (first cousin)
- Occupation: Politician

Faustino Michael Carlos "Mike" Tillmann Dy III (born September 17, 1979) is a Filipino politician. He is currently serving as representative of the 5th District of Isabela in the House of Representatives of the Philippines since 2019. He served as mayor of San Manuel, Isabela from 2010 to 2019.

== Early life ==
Dy was born on September 17, 1979 in Manila, to a prominent political family in Isabela. He is the son of Faustino Dy Jr. and Christine Tillmann.

== Political career ==
=== Mayor of San Manuel, Isabela (2010–2019) ===
In 2010, Dy became a mayor of San Manuel, Isabela where he served for three consecutive terms.

=== House of Representatives (2019–present) ===
In 2019, Dy was elected as representative of the newly established fifth district of Isabela.

In 2020, Dy was one of the 70 representatives who voted to permanently deny the renewal of broadcasting franchise of television network ABS-CBN.

== Personal life ==
Dy is married to Kristine Arnaldo-Dy and has four children.

His father, Faustino Dy Jr., was served as governor of Isabela from 2001 to 2004.

== Electoral history ==
Electoral history of Mike Dy III
Year	Office	Party	Votes received				Result
Year	Office	Party	Total	%	P.	Swing	Result
2010	Mayor of San Manuel, Isabela	NPC	8,317	—N/a	1st	—N/a	Won
2013	Mayor of San Manuel, Isabela	NPC	10,380	—N/a	1st	—N/a	Won
2016	Mayor of San Manuel, Isabela	NPC	9,690	—N/a	1st	—N/a	Won
2019	Representative (Isabela–5th)	PFP	80,031	—N/a	1st	—N/a	Won
2022	Representative (Isabela–5th)	NPC	82,062	66.47%	1st	—N/a	Won
2025	Representative (Isabela–5th)	Lakas	98,151	100.00%	1st	—N/a	Unopposed
