= List of barangays in Isabela =

The province of Isabela has 1,055 barangays comprising its 34 municipalities and 3 cities.

== Barangays ==
Most populous in its respective city/municipality (as of 2010)

Barangay	Population					City or municipality
Barangay	2010	2007	2000	1995	1990	City or municipality
Abra	1,580	1,421	1,183	1,029	929	Santiago
Abulan	810	949	888	714	685	Jones
Abut	2,525	2,027	2,197	1,950	1,816	Quezon
Addalam	517	592	596	586	547	Jones
Aga	744	706	671	748	657	Delfin Albano (Magsaysay)
Aggasian	3,436	3,263	2,889	2,537	2,318	Ilagan
Aggub	1,672	1,546	1,418	1,397	1,357	Cabagan
Agliam	391	381	344	316	320	San Manuel
Aguinaldo	335	299	228	198	250	Naguilian
Aguinaldo (Rizaluna Este)	1,081	1,016	1,023	934	850	Cordon
Alibadabad	1,764	1,412	1,287	1,102	1,101	San Mariano
Alibagu	6,524	5,521	4,092	2,061	1,623	Ilagan
Alicaocao	1,438	1,382	1,170	1,035	865	Cauayan
Alinam	1,148	706	851	786	876	Cauayan
Allangigan	645	580	573	454	500	Angadanan
Allinguigan 1st	1,796	1,831	1,763	1,579	1,376	Ilagan
Allinguigan 2nd	3,050	3,086	2,943	2,597	2,327	Ilagan
Allinguigan 3rd	1,181	1,135	1,090	914	701	Ilagan
Alomanay	596	645	548	477	515	Palanan
Alunan (Poblacion)	1,297	1,186	1,047	900	866	Quezon
Ambalatungan	1,376	1,299	971	779	836	Santiago
Ambatali	3,452	2,982	2,883	2,361	2,540	Ramon
Amistad	1,573	1,525	1,444	1,293	1,318	Alicia
Ammugauan	553	511	539	559	480	Santo Tomas
Amobocan	1,131	1,015	977	892	810	Cauayan
Anao	3,114	2,860	2,539	2,407	2,159	Cabagan
Anao	747	680	673	623	625	Roxas
Andabuen	2,292	2,120	1,745	1,600	1,701	Benito Soliven
Andarayan	406	374	400	357	337	Cauayan
Andarayan	1,164	1,208	1,208	1,011	908	Delfin Albano (Magsaysay)
Aneg	1,481	1,474	1,396	1,340	1,236	Delfin Albano (Magsaysay)
Angancasilian	1,084	953	890	744	697	Cabagan
Angoluan	715	647	569	502	418	Echague
Aniog	981	982	1,007	855	858	Angadanan
Annafunan	2,395	2,360	1,915	2,110	1,897	Echague
Annafunan	1,421	1,284	1,044	853	771	Tumauini
Annanuman	976	837	726	631	567	San Pablo
Anonang	416	494	392	370	290	San Guillermo
Anonang (Balitoc)	1,427	1,210	1,191	1,145	781	Cordon
Antagan	479	513	525	459	444	Santo Tomas
Antagan I	2,814	2,714	2,375	2,210	1,717	Tumauini
Antagan II	1,417	1,384	1,367	1,221	1,011	Tumauini
Antonino (Poblacion)	3,997	3,774	3,919	3,888	3,865	Alicia
Apanay	1,146	1,227	1,141	1,061	1,089	Alicia
Apiat	489	446	366	422	406	Aurora
Aplaya	171	175	194	215	179	Maconacon
Ara	551	477	348	357	355	Benito Soliven
Arabiat	1,219	1,085	1,019	872	842	Echague
Arcon	1,913	1,826	1,408	1,113	957	Tumauini
Arellano (Poblacion)	2,779	2,485	2,171	1,879	1,981	Quezon
Aringay	437	392	333	288	257	San Guillermo
Aromin	937	796	741	701	552	Echague
Arubub	469	490	447	430	409	Jones
Arusip	786	747	665	580	434	Ilagan
Auitan	1,120	1,083	995	980	1,039	San Pablo
Aurora	3,460	3,267	2,832	2,926	1,925	Alicia
Aurora	419	393	303	206	155	Quezon
Ayod	312	244	198	118	154	Dinapigue
Babanuang	2,482	2,374	2,294	2,188	2,042	San Manuel
Babaran	1,321	1,225	774	597	446	Echague
Bacareña	955	912	932	860	860	San Mateo
Bacnor East	927	770	797	788	664	Burgos
Bacnor West	1,366	1,269	1,243	1,268	1,199	Burgos
Bacradal	330	315	292	275	280	Echague
Baculod	1,593	1,533	1,494	1,335	1,256	Cauayan
Baculod (Poblacion)	4,348	4,497	4,346	4,371	4,269	Ilagan
Bagabag	727	706	678	582	541	Santo Tomas
Bagnos	2,250	2,011	1,652	1,550	1,628	Alicia
Bagnos	1,455	1,412	1,351	1,264	1,259	Aurora
Bagong Sikat	821	768	640	581	530	Alicia
Bagong Sikat	662	630	539	624	546	Naguilian
Bagong Sikat	2,092	1,981	1,743	1,664	1,693	San Mateo
Bagong Silang	542	530	564	565	488	Ilagan
Bagong Tanza	2,515	2,525	2,213	2,069	2,034	Aurora
Bagumbayan (Poblacion)	2,274	2,536	2,534	2,502	2,571	Ilagan
Bagutari	1,109	1,165	1,058	923	737	Santo Tomas
Balagan	1,139	1,024	953	899	803	San Mariano
Balasig	2,062	1,541	1,768	1,336	1,258	Cabagan
Balelleng	1,736	1,581	1,439	1,148	996	Santo Tomas
Baligatan	2,016	1,869	1,763	1,607	1,167	Ilagan
Balintocatoc	3,598	2,891	2,323	1,744	1,783	Santiago
Ballacayu	1,829	1,593	1,575	1,299	1,219	San Pablo
Ballacong	763	752	744	644	633	Ilagan
Ballesteros	1,146	964	760	671	613	Aurora
Balliao	588	501	335	370	421	Benito Soliven
Baluarte	4,282	3,866	3,324	2,499	2,230	Santiago
Balug	1,269	1,139	1,049	897	680	Tumauini
Bangad	2,386	2,274	2,040	1,920	1,701	Santa Maria
Bangag	1,221	1,145	1,116	1,146	1,060	Ilagan
Banig	831	699	537	421	346	Tumauini
Baniket	428	435	446	405	332	Angadanan
Bannagao	1,087	998	805	722	688	Aurora
Bannawag	488	440	334	349	296	Angadanan
Bannawag	320	268	208	198	208	Aurora
Bannawag	581	621	579	564	594	Jones
Bannawag Norte	1,177	1,113	865	763	600	Santiago
Banquero	1,984	1,958	2,000	1,750	1,641	Reina Mercedes
Bantay	277	267	275	244	166	Jones
Bantug	469	466	449	387	391	Angadanan
Bantug	1,004	949	932	824	735	Ramon
Bantug	956	840	681	584	546	Tumauini
Bantug-Petines	2,019	1,896	1,773	1,606	1,545	Alicia
Bantug (Poblacion)	5,811	5,969	5,497	5,414	4,667	Roxas
Barangay District 1 (Poblacion)	914	838	944	939	833	Tumauini
Barangay District 2 (Poblacion)	766	676	727	819	574	Tumauini
Barangay District 3 (Poblacion)	1,020	928	860	575	439	Tumauini
Barangay District 4 (Poblacion)	832	829	758	671	623	Tumauini
Barangay I (Poblacion)	2,201	2,066	2,084	2,044	1,919	Jones
Barangay I (Poblacion)	1,808	1,285	1,550	1,516	1,550	San Mateo
Barangay II (Poblacion)	3,185	2,993	2,727	2,611	2,388	Jones
Barangay II (Poblacion)	1,736	1,782	1,945	1,676	1,539	San Mateo
Barangay III (Poblacion)	2,186	2,124	2,008	2,179	2,190	San Mateo
Barangay IV (Poblacion)	2,998	2,849	2,918	2,772	2,633	San Mateo
Barangcuag	702	647	619	472	404	Angadanan
Barangcuag	547	522	540	451	459	Jones
Barcolan	929	924	942	650	584	Gamu
Baringin Norte	237	209	185	163	152	Cauayan
Baringin Sur	1,082	1,043	977	819	717	Cauayan
Barucboc Norte	3,215	2,821	2,780	2,579	2,607	Quezon
Barumbong	1,148	1,211	1,119	1,000	915	Santo Tomas
Batal	7,994	7,027	6,695	4,928	4,086	Santiago
Batong-Labang	2,259	2,379	1,637	1,493	2,357	Ilagan
Baui	389	394	395	340	443	Angadanan
Bautista	1,170	1,088	922	809	575	San Agustin
Bayabo	1,032	951	918	869	1,141	Delfin Albano (Magsaysay)
Bayabo East	1,323	1,084	1,185	1,015	990	Tumauini
Bella Luz	1,193	894	850	770	757	San Mateo
Benguet	408	341	232	310	205	Echague
Bicobian	674	627	461	378	236	Divilacan
Biga Occidental	636	634	611	590	523	Santo Tomas
Biga Oriental	593	650	639	600	572	Santo Tomas
Bigao	1,387	1,412	1,363	1,002	1,193	Ilagan
Binarsang	378	335	300	280	326	Reina Mercedes
Binarzang	846	874	815	722	744	Quirino
Binatug	1,822	1,581	1,367	1,149	968	San Mariano
Binguang	2,121	1,941	1,916	1,683	1,782	San Pablo
Binmonton	1,583	1,645	1,421	1,320	1,294	Mallig
Binogtungan	311	283	223	151	158	Benito Soliven
Bisag	780	743	643	508	459	Palanan
Bitabian	1,846	1,697	1,528	1,424	1,405	San Mariano
Bolinao	1,351	1,254	1,125	974	911	Aurora
Bolinao-Culalabo	1,474	1,536	1,442	1,238	1,151	Santo Tomas
Bonifacio	878	857	738	708	656	Alicia
Bonifacio	381	394	260	239	205	Angadanan
Bubug	1,088	1,160	1,083	1,018	850	Santo Tomas
Bucal Norte	268	238	275	235	328	Dinapigue
Bucal Sur	774	664	470	459	361	Dinapigue
Buena Suerte	1,105	1,069	895	772	795	Cauayan
Buenavista	929	876	620	527	547	Angadanan
Buenavista	872	765	703	651	567	Gamu
Buenavista	738	564	547	586	562	Santa Maria
Buenavista	3,776	3,682	3,227	2,816	2,659	Santiago
Bugallon	492	449	454	382	441	Cauayan
Bugallon Norte	5,184	4,747	4,014	3,811	3,624	Ramon
Bugallon Proper (Poblacion)	6,791	6,609	6,292	5,802	5,776	Ramon
Buneg	1,261	1,190	1,120	994	1,055	Echague
Bungad	1,781	1,660	1,558	1,349	1,146	San Pablo
Bunnay	570	603	598	577	508	Angadanan
Burgos	2,041	1,986	1,969	1,675	1,598	Alicia
Burgos	1,758	1,614	1,594	1,566	1,500	Naguilian
Burgos	2,652	2,501	1,916	1,552	972	Ramon
Burgos	762	639	632	648	505	San Guillermo
Busilelao	934	718	771	704	748	Echague
Bustamante	815	719	685	584	509	Luna
Buyasan	781	705	568	456	435	San Mariano
Buyon	1,158	1,042	883	797	620	Cauayan
Cabannungan 1st	749	706	603	524	572	Ilagan
Cabannungan 2nd	1,486	1,506	1,373	1,166	1,072	Ilagan
Cabaritan	726	594	518	512	459	San Manuel
Cabaruan	5,386	4,623	3,471	3,404	2,385	Cauayan
Cabaruan	1,397	1,315	1,144	1,040	1,085	Naguilian
Cabaruan	463	453	443	422	419	Quirino
Cabeseria 10 (Lapigui)	1,751	1,759	1,681	1,423	1,374	Ilagan
Cabeseria 14 and 16 (Casilagan)	2,303	2,337	2,101	1,978	1,837	Ilagan
Cabeseria 17 and 21 (San Rafael)	1,188	1,131	1,062	1,043	968	Ilagan
Cabeseria 19 (Villa Suerte)	826	784	786	755	661	Ilagan
Cabeseria 2 (Dappat)	1,115	1,048	1,020	980	900	Ilagan
Cabeseria 22 (Sablang)	875	799	837	830	742	Ilagan
Cabeseria 23 (San Francisco)	887	889	811	739	747	Ilagan
Cabeseria 25 (Sta. Lucia)	788	814	739	674	555	Ilagan
Cabeseria 27 (Abuan)	857	856	809	699	577	Ilagan
Cabeseria 3 (San Fernando)	785	768	694	619	561	Ilagan
Cabeseria 4 (San Manuel)	545	514	446	471	444	Ilagan
Cabeseria 5 (Baribad)	808	753	707	343	307	Ilagan
Cabeseria 6 & 24 (Villa Marcos)	1,166	1,087	1,077	1,078	954	Ilagan
Cabeseria 7 (Nangalisan)	802	744	715	682	498	Ilagan
Cabeseria 9 and 11 (Capogotan)	1,464	1,433	1,375	1,217	1,181	Ilagan
Cabugao	675	642	585	536	551	Cauayan
Cabugao (Poblacion)	1,622	1,576	1,343	1,150	1,305	Echague
Cabulay	3,452	3,230	2,604	2,373	2,187	Santiago
Caddangan/Limbauan	1,316	1,079	965	825	698	San Pablo
Cadsalan	1,254	1,138	1,000	825	725	San Mariano
Cadu	576	524	510	455	458	Ilagan
Caipilan	660	626	587	540	544	Aurora
Calabayan-Minanga	1,751	1,562	1,501	1,459	1,201	Angadanan
Calaccab	1,221	1,055	1,033	926	893	Angadanan
Calamagui	1,251	1,221	1,156	1,205	1,300	San Pablo
Calamagui 1st	3,450	3,224	3,057	2,811	2,237	Ilagan
Calamagui 2nd	2,944	2,805	2,713	2,907	2,482	Ilagan
Calamagui East	854	860	771	829	741	Santa Maria
Calamagui North	1,192	1,107	976	969	812	Santa Maria
Calamagui West	781	765	711	727	584	Santa Maria
Calangigan (Calamagui)	719	614	606	516	513	Quezon
Calanigan Norte	409	426	438	412	399	Santo Tomas
Calanigan Sur	591	596	552	478	544	Santo Tomas
Calao East (Poblacion)	4,111	4,753	4,649	4,706	4,977	Santiago
Calao West (Poblacion)	1,024	1,314	1,315	1,872	2,324	Santiago
Calaoagan	334	279	178	198	102	San Guillermo
Calaocan	632	643	498	446	261	Angadanan
Calaocan	1,285	1,210	994	965	851	Cabatuan
Calaocan	422	348	415	379	279	San Agustin
Calaocan	6,176	5,900	5,610	4,879	4,326	Santiago
Calaocan (Poblacion)	3,325	2,979	2,832	2,758	2,524	Alicia
Caligayan	1,477	1,437	1,047	922	828	Tumauini
Caliguian (Poblacion)	6,093	6,356	6,057	5,783	5,506	Burgos
Calimaturod	381	389	356	331	291	Cordon
Calinaoan Centro	831	926	867	796	844	Santo Tomas
Calinaoan Malasin	463	483	485	502	434	Santo Tomas
Calinaoan Norte	634	638	565	587	609	Santo Tomas
Calinaoan Sur	506	451	443	404	422	Delfin Albano (Magsaysay)
Callao	1,884	1,876	1,761	1,722	1,735	Alicia
Caloocan	525	557	373	277	–	Delfin Albano (Magsaysay)
Camaal	1,230	1,236	1,134	1,005	1,045	Quirino
Camarag	1,581	1,380	1,277	918	898	San Isidro
Camarao	954	789	728	612	569	Cordon
Camarunggayan	851	794	778	699	653	Aurora
Camasi	1,938	1,817	1,404	1,498	1,249	Tumauini
Campanario	282	243	225	238	251	Angadanan
Camunatan	927	927	848	757	647	Ilagan
Canadam	162	257	206	225	81	Maconacon
Canan	1,709	1,539	1,390	1,209	1,051	Cabatuan
Canangan	715	630	587	498	503	Angadanan
Caniguing	615	579	393	400	261	Echague
Cañogan Abajo Norte	545	590	553	510	358	Santo Tomas
Cañogan Abajo Sur	589	504	504	541	440	Santo Tomas
Cañogan Alto	736	790	700	607	553	Santo Tomas
Cansan	1,283	1,150	1,063	760	831	Cabagan
Capellan	2,771	2,553	2,227	1,926	1,558	Ilagan
Capirpiriwan	3,437	2,891	2,787	2,726	2,416	Cordon
Capitol	662	688	641	522	541	Delfin Albano (Magsaysay)
Capo	836	857	757	642	564	Ilagan
Capuseran (Capurocan)	803	730	680	602	532	Benito Soliven
Caquilingan (San Luis)	2,417	2,403	2,200	1,695	1,301	Cordon
Carabatan Bacareno	220	201	213	197	206	Cauayan
Carabatan Chica	545	543	500	406	410	Cauayan
Carabatan Grande	302	284	270	201	358	Cauayan
Carabatan Punta	418	457	439	381	386	Cauayan
Caralucud	565	533	474	446	456	San Pablo
Caraniogan	877	873	796	744	676	San Manuel
Carikkikan Norte	424	326	322	301	229	Ilagan
Carikkikan Sur	170	126	139	131	103	Ilagan
Carmencita	1,268	1,192	1,131	980	912	Delfin Albano (Magsaysay)
Carpentero	941	889	836	760	678	Tumauini
Carulay	1,084	944	876	789	742	Echague
Casala	1,199	1,033	1,001	941	1,005	San Mariano
Casalatan	564	576	469	429	408	Cauayan
Casibarag Norte	2,945	3,050	2,839	2,458	2,510	Cabagan
Casibarag Sur	2,826	2,894	2,721	2,354	2,249	Cabagan
Casili	1,272	1,233	1,227	1,100	1,218	Mallig
Cassap Fuera	138	67	95	78	72	Cauayan
Castillo	903	707	631	546	500	Echague
Catabayungan	4,539	4,668	4,365	4,055	3,831	Cabagan
Catabban	1,463	1,298	1,282	1,111	902	Burgos
Cataguing	1,705	1,436	1,385	1,385	1,199	San Mariano
Catalina	104	105	79	123	49	Cauayan
Cebu	2,613	2,413	2,069	1,975	1,861	San Isidro
Centro	2,257	2,510	2,551	2,442	2,149	Santo Tomas
Centro - San Antonio	3,739	3,745	3,340	3,330	3,189	Ilagan
Centro (Poblacion)	1,196	1,015	1,297	1,354	1,539	Cabagan
Centro (Poblacion)	1,280	1,203	1,399	1,367	1,359	Cabatuan
Centro 1 (Poblacion)	660	602	618	607	644	Luna
Centro 1 (Poblacion)	2,346	2,129	1,713	1,645	1,509	San Guillermo
Centro 2 (Poblacion)	1,444	1,378	1,248	1,200	1,105	Luna
Centro 2 (Poblacion)	2,202	2,165	1,901	1,836	1,632	San Guillermo
Centro 3 (Poblacion)	629	535	542	549	585	Luna
Centro East (Poblacion)	1,823	2,805	2,772	3,516	3,050	Santiago
Centro I (Poblacion)	1,230	1,388	1,374	1,233	1,394	Angadanan
Centro I (Poblacion)	1,955	1,936	1,923	1,751	1,828	Mallig
Centro II (Poblacion)	1,810	1,878	1,761	1,679	1,751	Angadanan
Centro II (Poblacion)	1,288	1,239	1,544	1,591	1,599	Mallig
Centro III (Poblacion)	988	1,081	995	949	1,152	Angadanan
Centro Poblacion	663	646	706	711	894	Ilagan
Centro West (Poblacion)	2,375	2,697	2,627	2,780	2,773	Santiago
Colorado	968	1,013	829	757	711	San Guillermo
Colunguan	1,134	1,197	1,078	993	957	Santo Tomas
Compania	1,098	984	989	763	635	Tumauini
Concepcion	360	361	340	290	276	Delfin Albano (Magsaysay)
Concepcion	616	554	551	417	377	Luna
Consular	594	551	545	406	413	Angadanan
Cubag	2,499	2,469	2,137	1,732	1,721	Cabagan
Culalabat	852	766	661	503	459	Cauayan
Culasi	1,101	1,051	962	875	821	Palanan
Culing Centro	530	499	435	368	360	Cabatuan
Culing East	394	400	392	333	335	Cabatuan
Culing West	952	909	791	692	647	Cabatuan
Cullalabo Del Norte	1,494	1,526	1,455	1,472	1,360	Burgos
Cullalabo Del Sur	1,123	1,043	1,029	890	866	Burgos
Cullalabo San Antonio	2,826	2,776	2,032	1,962	1,675	Burgos
Cumabao	1,933	1,698	1,484	1,122	1,061	Tumauini
Cumu	906	953	944	698	757	Angadanan
Cutog Grande	426	699	691	517	436	Reina Mercedes
Cutog Pequeño	462	396	312	261	238	Reina Mercedes
Dabburab	1,101	966	1,057	910	794	Cauayan
Dabubu Grande	1,348	1,222	1,180	970	798	San Agustin
Dabubu Pequeño	584	591	548	504	432	San Agustin
Dadap	1,068	848	773	691	698	Luna
Dagupan	1,167	1,104	981	864	722	Alicia
Dagupan	269	269	249	263	215	Benito Soliven
Dagupan	1,446	1,381	1,273	959	928	San Mateo
Dalakip	792	763	747	697	729	Angadanan
Dalena	1,847	1,663	1,488	1,351	1,191	San Pablo
Dalenat	1,444	1,504	1,309	1,306	1,270	Angadanan
Dalibubon	972	776	751	650	648	Jones
Dalig	1,106	1,010	1,117	1,081	981	Burgos
Dalig-Kalinga	894	785	700	599	463	Aurora
Daligan	869	810	858	841	890	Jones
Dallao	1,787	1,754	1,482	1,389	1,063	Cordon
Dammang East	1,216	1,204	1,072	990	929	Echague
Dammang West	1,262	1,133	1,007	877	912	Echague
Dammao	599	525	509	359	286	Gamu
Dangan	2,520	2,380	2,034	1,824	1,552	Reina Mercedes
Danipa	459	399	338	308	245	Benito Soliven
Dappig	453	532	573	502	550	San Agustin
Daragutan East	1,148	1,042	919	872	765	San Mariano
Daragutan West	1,575	1,420	1,231	1,053	986	San Mariano
Daramuangan Norte	2,024	1,758	1,602	1,321	1,366	San Mateo
Daramuangan Sur	1,455	1,342	1,167	1,144	1,135	San Mateo
De Vera	832	727	596	559	466	Cauayan
Del Corpuz	656	578	532	468	474	Cabatuan
Del Pilar	1,780	1,770	1,592	1,256	1,246	Cabatuan
Del Pilar	1,249	1,374	1,019	578	623	San Mariano
Dialaoyao	1,055	978	997	911	867	Palanan
Diamantina	819	720	712	662	588	Aurora
Diamantina	2,573	2,397	2,179	1,981	1,842	Cabatuan
Diana	300	328	331	257	301	Maconacon
Dianao	657	581	527	420	366	Cauayan
Diarao	1,703	1,488	1,295	1,309	1,384	Jones
Diasan	613	288	332	195	188	Echague
Dibulo	1,349	1,148	776	616	514	Dinapigue
Dibulos	179	158	135	178	188	Divilacan
Dibuluan	2,367	2,320	2,194	1,933	2,208	Jones
Dibuluan	1,449	1,248	1,158	979	718	San Mariano
Dicabisagan East (Poblacion)	1,050	1,011	942	814	706	Palanan
Dicabisagan West (Poblacion)	2,317	2,255	2,282	1,878	1,509	Palanan
Dicadyuan	700	803	824	656	658	Palanan
Dicamay	1,524	1,328	1,097	828	963	San Mariano
Dicamay I	1,258	1,067	1,000	840	697	Jones
Dicamay II	1,402	1,315	1,181	950	779	Jones
Dicambangan	270	265	165	150	103	Divilacan
Dicaraoyan	385	325	250	220	189	Echague
Dicaroyan	313	311	170	156	415	Divilacan
Dicatian	344	338	247	146	152	Divilacan
Diddadungan	665	895	724	604	448	Palanan
Didiyan	1,145	1,254	1,112	924	730	Palanan
Dietban	719	648	422	390	285	San Guillermo
Digumased (Poblacion)	2,529	2,332	1,281	1,506	662	Dinapigue
Dilakit	406	397	115	147	121	Divilacan
Dimalicu-licu	354	325	292	252	223	Palanan
Dimaluade	252	181	171	112	86	Dinapigue
Dimapnat	965	748	741	449	277	Divilacan
Dimapula (Poblacion)	759	727	459	351	339	Divilacan
Dimasalansan	286	249	212	163	160	Divilacan
Dimasari	742	738	694	641	570	Palanan
Dimatican	895	832	817	710	683	Palanan
Dingading	904	876	632	621	544	San Guillermo
Dipacamo	793	756	555	575	522	San Guillermo
Dipaluda	550	535	507	510	447	Angadanan
Dipangit	535	511	515	448	471	Jones
Dipudo	243	235	185	142	186	Divilacan
Dipusu	911	636	687	687	653	San Mariano
Disimpit	498	526	597	478	502	Jones
Disimuray	893	934	903	828	706	Cauayan
District 1 (Poblacion)	2,831	2,169	2,215	2,137	2,374	San Manuel
District 2 (Poblacion)	2,322	2,159	2,009	1,844	1,885	San Manuel
District 3 (Poblacion)	2,651	2,610	2,599	2,519	2,398	San Manuel
District 4 (Poblacion)	2,241	2,130	2,257	2,153	2,073	San Manuel
District I (Poblacion)	3,407	3,072	2,901	2,886	2,801	Benito Soliven
District I (Poblacion)	11,439	11,964	10,387	8,851	8,012	Cauayan
District I (Poblacion)	1,033	1,046	1,061	1,012	1,005	Gamu
District I (Poblacion)	1,241	1,060	1,006	880	1,011	Reina Mercedes
District II (Poblacion)	1,966	1,840	1,633	1,529	1,555	Benito Soliven
District II (Poblacion)	2,622	3,063	3,105	3,582	4,076	Cauayan
District II (Poblacion)	1,924	1,911	1,839	1,818	1,784	Gamu
District II (Poblacion)	1,800	1,711	1,567	1,379	1,352	Reina Mercedes
District III (Poblacion)	5,091	5,562	5,341	4,799	4,598	Cauayan
District III (Poblacion)	2,603	2,375	2,204	2,111	1,836	Gamu
Disulap	2,420	1,866	1,811	1,843	1,640	San Mariano
Disusuan	544	522	474	427	425	San Mariano
Ditarum	315	306	286	216	197	Divilacan
Divinan	795	713	592	562	539	Jones
Divisoria	530	474	414	348	325	Aurora
Divisoria	869	748	803	707	614	Santa Maria
Divisoria	4,372	4,497	3,940	3,333	3,205	Santiago
Dolores	1,268	1,218	1,152	1,029	962	Quirino
Doña Concha	583	479	413	350	322	Roxas
Dubinan East	2,485	2,780	2,847	2,848	2,660	Santiago
Dubinan West	3,312	3,437	3,289	2,820	2,748	Santiago
Dugayong	618	590	523	573	543	Echague
Dumawing	1,054	1,052	980	838	822	Jones
Duminit	1,305	1,186	1,075	947	868	Cauayan
Dunmon	511	520	341	259	203	Quezon
Duroc	602	606	600	504	496	Angadanan
Eden	2,068	1,981	1,966	1,830	1,748	San Manuel
Eleonor (Poblacion)	242	284	264	587	970	Maconacon
Esperanza	283	278	293	282	290	Angadanan
Esperanza East	1,132	1,106	1,085	972	896	Aurora
Esperanza West	984	1,008	922	932	883	Aurora
Estrada	703	588	508	459	452	Quezon
Estrella	429	467	419	394	347	San Guillermo
Estrella	1,624	1,505	1,515	1,236	1,198	San Mateo
Faustino (Sipay)	1,221	1,130	990	899	842	Cauayan
Fely (Poblacion)	752	836	697	–	1,011	Maconacon
Fermeldy (Hcda. San Francisco)	1,592	1,674	1,395	1,438	1,242	Tumauini
Flores	848	765	676	667	605	Naguilian
Fugaru	832	925	922	887	804	Angadanan
Fugu	957	855	854	708	791	Echague
Fugu	1,557	1,462	1,408	1,290	1,023	Ilagan
Fugu	1,292	1,225	1,115	1,045	985	Jones
Fugu Abajo	986	831	814	755	612	Tumauini
Fugu Norte	731	683	697	603	580	Tumauini
Fugu Sur	146	122	130	130	137	Tumauini
Furao	2,267	2,185	2,157	1,771	1,860	Gamu
Fuyo	929	805	839	703	675	Ilagan
Gaddanan	2,141	1,900	1,879	1,702	1,630	San Mateo
Gagabutan	412	406	368	357	297	Cauayan
Gangalan	1,537	1,248	1,011	873	797	San Mariano
Gappal	2,519	2,419	2,296	1,914	1,900	Cauayan
Garit Norte	1,309	1,140	1,069	949	841	Echague
Garit Sur	588	556	556	512	402	Echague
Garita	714	741	700	545	481	Cabagan
Gayong	2,239	2,065	1,839	1,576	1,359	Cordon
Gayong-Gayong Norte	721	654	550	502	473	Ilagan
Gayong-Gayong Sur	1,006	1,025	864	926	717	Ilagan
General Aguinaldo	4,328	3,980	3,496	3,010	2,590	Ramon
Gomez	575	497	360	322	308	Benito Soliven
Gomez	2,060	2,071	1,870	1,768	1,644	San Isidro
Guam	1,036	965	672	665	560	San Guillermo
Guayabal	1,323	1,253	1,216	1,050	1,007	Cauayan
Gucab	2,423	2,196	1,909	1,589	1,470	Echague
Gud	1,550	1,393	1,208	1,230	1,121	San Isidro
Guibang	2,644	2,282	1,882	1,434	946	Gamu
Guilingan	418	320	177	134	86	Benito Soliven
Guinatan	1,654	1,546	1,503	1,315	1,402	Ilagan
Gumbauan	1,851	1,759	1,297	1,217	1,191	Echague
Guminga	435	451	408	394	374	San Pablo
Harana	1,499	1,288	1,221	1,054	937	Luna
Holy Friday	1,717	1,497	1,476	1,332	1,262	Mallig
Ibujan	817	688	527	490	449	San Mariano
Imbiao	1,517	1,348	1,341	1,162	1,062	Roxas
Imelda Bliss Village	5,130	5,121	4,440	3,241	1,847	Ilagan
Inanama	1,104	1,019	965	855	777	Alicia
Ingud Norte	677	687	654	627	589	Angadanan
Ingud Sur	396	422	347	339	315	Angadanan
Ipil	2,088	2,087	1,912	1,840	1,695	Echague
Kalabaza	1,785	1,854	1,675	1,219	1,107	Aurora
Kalusutan	267	259	280	211	258	Angadanan
La Paz	5,106	3,711	3,697	3,258	3,158	Cabatuan
La Salette	498	384	376	378	329	Benito Soliven
La Suerte	1,843	1,798	1,679	1,555	1,356	Angadanan
La Union	776	663	641	600	698	Naguilian
Labinab	1,830	1,779	1,639	1,379	1,236	Cauayan
Labinab Grande (Poblacion)	921	631	548	533	560	Reina Mercedes
Labinab Pequeño (Poblacion)	1,051	1,007	995	854	938	Reina Mercedes
Lacab	612	591	525	487	510	Jones
Lalauanan	759	627	620	577	608	Tumauini
Lalog 1	1,163	1,163	977	852	754	Luna
Lalog 2	731	659	594	574	544	Luna
Lanna	2,477	2,273	2,141	1,879	1,827	Tumauini
Lanting	1,121	1,033	986	932	862	Roxas
Laoag	1,097	912	886	748	689	San Agustin
Lapogan	1,954	2,239	1,889	1,741	1,470	Tumauini
Laurel (Centro Norte)	1,068	1,067	1,055	914	1,025	Cordon
Lenzon	900	802	759	708	609	Gamu
Lepanto	1,580	1,408	1,319	1,139	982	Quezon
Libertad	1,691	1,442	1,337	1,453	1,259	Echague
Libertad	1,036	755	693	591	753	San Mariano
Linamanan	733	682	522	489	457	Jones
Lingaling	1,050	934	1,049	990	966	Santa Maria
Lingaling	1,364	1,302	1,382	1,245	1,239	Tumauini
Linglingay	2,286	2,228	2,058	1,926	1,541	Alicia
Linglingay	688	723	576	541	471	Cauayan
Linglingay	1,237	1,114	1,073	858	761	Gamu
Linomot	2,129	2,100	1,970	1,615	1,681	Jones
Lita (Poblacion)	282	297	316	625	1,163	Maconacon
Liwanag	1,517	1,539	1,210	1,089	1,056	Tumauini
Liwliwa	251	258	185	153	124	Angadanan
Lomboy	477	468	470	338	370	Angadanan
Loria	1,224	1,235	1,140	1,042	1,002	Angadanan
Lourdes (El Escaño)	720	713	582	443	470	Angadanan
Lucban	412	363	318	321	390	Benito Soliven
Lucban	836	808	737	702	672	Roxas
Lullutan	1,665	1,798	1,686	1,536	1,373	Ilagan
Luna	1,935	1,850	1,818	1,552	1,371	Quirino
Luna	1,003	863	745	681	533	Santiago
Luna (Poblacion)	1,632	1,444	1,168	1,252	1,024	Roxas
Luquilu	1,779	1,684	1,700	1,645	1,612	Cabagan
Luyao	590	580	595	504	487	Luna
Luzon	1,672	1,647	1,399	1,451	1,378	Cabatuan
M. H. del Pilar	3,749	3,487	3,079	2,709	1,720	Alicia
Mabangug	336	305	300	227	147	Cabagan
Mabantad	1,135	934	1,009	821	752	Cauayan
Mabbayad	724	576	433	442	322	Echague
Mabini	1,439	1,353	1,313	1,218	1,021	Alicia
Mabini	4,601	4,211	4,103	3,620	3,152	Gamu
Mabini	7,724	7,744	7,048	6,600	6,142	Santiago
Mabuhay	457	478	404	438	397	Angadanan
Mabuhay	707	605	595	568	530	Echague
Macalaoat	1,028	984	989	815	835	Cabatuan
Macalauat	557	565	558	519	512	Angadanan
Macañao	934	807	838	738	621	Luna
Macaniao	530	544	401	361	305	Angadanan
Macatal	793	837	699	607	530	Aurora
Macayucayu	1,260	603	520	441	400	San Mariano
Macugay	320	236	218	191	144	Luna
Madadamian	795	712	540	463	345	Echague
Magassi	2,202	2,053	1,663	1,431	1,426	Cabagan
Magdalena	2,129	2,121	1,975	1,826	1,798	Cabatuan
Magleticia	601	577	352	397	305	Echague
Magsaysay	681	629	589	489	502	Cabatuan
Magsaysay (Centro Sur Oeste)	577	546	564	530	491	Cordon
Magsaysay (Poblacion)	1,332	1,391	1,499	1,353	1,802	Alicia
Magsaysay (Poblacion)	2,800	2,347	2,372	1,822	1,976	Naguilian
Makindol	494	465	391	373	299	Benito Soliven
Malalam	1,697	1,698	1,490	1,304	1,305	Ilagan
Malalinta	1,726	1,594	1,389	1,402	1,396	San Manuel
Malamag East	695	674	693	654	596	Tumauini
Malamag West	1,206	714	731	735	608	Tumauini
Malannao	238	220	217	184	221	Angadanan
Malannit	929	842	796	732	763	Jones
Malapagay	350	416	476	442	466	Santo Tomas
Malapat	2,005	1,988	1,840	1,545	1,439	Cordon
Malasin	273	279	296	297	310	Angadanan
Malasin	1,648	1,554	1,533	1,366	1,338	Aurora
Malasin	1,194	1,099	1,113	1,071	1,093	Burgos
Malasin	520	530	534	1,283	1,903	Maconacon
Malasin	2,128	2,212	2,190	1,820	1,892	San Mateo
Malasin (Angeles)	1,058	887	955	851	736	Ilagan
Malibago	1,382	1,278	1,136	987	963	Echague
Maligaya	2,177	2,144	1,861	1,500	1,348	Cauayan
Maligaya	1,966	1,815	1,744	1,523	1,481	Echague
Maligaya	2,163	2,132	1,990	1,770	1,714	Mallig
Maligaya	1,663	1,604	1,634	1,509	1,186	Palanan
Maligaya	2,195	2,133	1,905	1,868	1,935	Tumauini
Malitao	1,389	1,060	1,358	1,333	1,269	Echague
Mallabo	721	551	600	594	663	San Mariano
Mallalatang Grande	609	557	529	454	448	Reina Mercedes
Mallalatang Tunggui	710	700	672	594	586	Reina Mercedes
Maluno Norte	1,148	1,103	1,088	1,123	1,121	Benito Soliven
Maluno Sur	1,185	1,134	1,207	887	1,018	Benito Soliven
Malvar	3,305	3,129	3,040	2,689	2,878	Santiago
Mambabanga	2,151	1,740	1,208	1,152	992	Luna
Manano	1,780	1,622	1,362	1,325	907	Mallig
Manaoag	2,114	1,385	1,268	1,206	1,036	Cauayan
Manaoag	830	747	693	640	617	Quirino
Manaring	1,868	2,022	1,946	1,700	1,647	Ilagan
Manaring	310	284	248	230	250	Naguilian
Mangandingay	308	315	265	247	245	Angadanan
Mangcuram	820	767	789	651	698	Ilagan
Mangga	798	707	702	636	534	Quezon
Mansibang	638	590	487	498	500	Naguilian
Mapalad	1,481	1,366	1,267	932	1,020	San Agustin
Mapuroc	640	623	537	522	475	San Mateo
Marabulig I	3,108	2,491	1,958	1,586	1,417	Cauayan
Marabulig II	1,457	1,536	1,333	1,170	1,053	Cauayan
Marana I	1,408	1,324	1,175	811	873	Ilagan
Marana II	571	532	558	405	433	Ilagan
Marana III	650	562	550	477	484	Ilagan
Marannao	970	905	877	857	828	San Mariano
Mararigue	1,316	1,273	1,263	1,099	940	San Manuel
Marasat Grande	1,269	1,216	1,075	835	808	San Mateo
Marasat Pequeño	1,874	1,969	1,883	1,620	1,711	San Mateo
Marcos	1,253	1,135	976	846	751	Roxas
Marikit	650	869	892	811	797	Palanan
Masaya Centro (Poblacion)	1,375	1,615	1,544	1,522	1,401	San Agustin
Masaya Norte	1,298	1,157	1,157	1,140	1,011	San Agustin
Masaya Sur	2,412	2,376	2,383	2,078	1,751	San Agustin
Masigun	396	452	417	379	392	Burgos
Masigun	731	789	731	627	581	Roxas
Masipi East	1,902	1,620	1,512	1,116	831	Cabagan
Masipi West	1,581	1,226	1,328	977	1,153	Cabagan
Mataas na Kahoy	650	641	648	614	471	Alicia
Matusalem	2,021	1,834	1,846	1,502	1,107	Roxas
Maui	860	839	816	756	674	Delfin Albano (Magsaysay)
Minabang	1,403	1,348	1,144	948	813	Ilagan
Minagbag	3,070	2,949	2,541	2,265	2,152	Quezon
Minallo	2,426	2,434	2,292	2,130	2,341	Naguilian
Minanga	490	591	458	816	1,338	Maconacon
Minanga	1,382	1,366	1,359	1,196	1,233	Naguilian
Minanga	3,280	2,588	2,464	2,290	1,938	San Mariano
Minanga	1,185	1,131	967	864	724	Tumauini
Minanga Norte	1,043	1,061	1,032	989	955	San Pablo
Minanga Proper	732	726	652	597	466	Angadanan
Minanga Sur	1,207	1,125	985	926	940	San Pablo
Minante I	5,767	5,644	4,407	3,937	3,054	Cauayan
Minante II	2,405	1,842	1,757	1,512	1,302	Cauayan
Minuri	2,495	1,652	2,343	1,843	1,961	Jones
Moldero	1,430	1,423	1,310	1,342	1,140	Tumauini
Morado	829	771	776	981	711	Ilagan
Mozzozzin North	1,171	1,119	1,049	961	777	Santa Maria
Mozzozzin Sur	1,922	1,462	1,306	1,159	896	Santa Maria
Muñoz East	1,973	1,926	1,919	1,781	1,847	Roxas
Muñoz West	3,463	3,104	2,865	2,923	2,775	Roxas
Nabbuan	3,040	2,737	2,148	1,782	1,580	Santiago
Nacalma	828	772	533	504	498	Benito Soliven
Naganacan	1,319	1,116	1,011	907	774	Cauayan
Naganacan	1,660	1,643	1,206	1,307	806	Santa Maria
Nagbacalan	1,246	1,163	1,121	1,019	1,043	Ramon
Nagbukel	1,516	1,453	1,198	1,094	996	San Isidro
Nagcampegan	345	297	306	255	257	Cauayan
Naggasican	5,379	4,554	1,968	667	589	Santiago
Nagrumbuan	3,589	3,453	3,265	3,048	2,714	Cauayan
Naguilian Norte	2,604	2,988	2,463	2,231	2,019	Ilagan
Naguilian Sur	1,103	1,105	997	866	952	Ilagan
Nakar	663	552	504	464	389	San Guillermo
Namnama	1,656	1,431	1,505	1,404	1,349	Cabatuan
Namnama	943	911	778	656	874	Ilagan
Namnama	792	746	700	600	461	Jones
Namnama	1,307	1,057	1,000	962	982	Tumauini
Nampicuan	812	822	721	588	546	Aurora
Nanaguan	482	486	385	281	264	Ilagan
Napaccu Grande	1,006	1,078	951	817	749	Reina Mercedes
Napaccu Pequeño	1,236	949	893	777	721	Reina Mercedes
Napaliong	1,613	1,673	1,565	1,242	1,396	Jones
Narra	1,889	1,618	1,296	1,178	1,034	Echague
Nemmatan	631	574	567	557	563	San Agustin
New Magsaysay	845	827	698	664	617	Benito Soliven
Ngarag	944	872	875	692	834	Cabagan
Nilumisu	1,063	553	623	548	421	Echague
Nueva Era	1,535	1,420	1,330	1,135	1,100	Cabatuan
Nueva Era	1,826	1,641	1,414	1,285	1,316	San Manuel
Nungnungan I	1,791	1,562	1,501	1,427	1,123	Cauayan
Nungnungan II	1,179	870	815	775	651	Cauayan
Olango	2,068	1,987	1,677	1,387	1,273	Mallig
Old Centro I	1,914	1,690	1,561	1,438	1,347	San Mateo
Old Centro II	889	837	827	722	727	San Mateo
Old San Mariano	1,935	1,900	1,742	1,618	1,605	San Mariano
Oscariz	3,247	3,133	2,950	2,797	2,650	Ramon
Osmeña (Centro Sur Este)	952	939	946	798	963	Cordon
Osmeña (Sinippil)	2,762	2,173	2,205	2,190	1,934	Ilagan
Pabil	703	653	628	581	538	Ramon
Paddad	5,033	4,303	3,569	2,875	2,466	Alicia
Pag-asa	1,561	1,438	1,119	1,087	1,001	Echague
Pagrang-ayan	2,010	1,867	2,051	1,512	1,586	Ramon
Palacian	1,371	1,228	1,230	1,119	1,124	San Agustin
Palagao	528	461	453	413	396	Jones
Palattao	2,295	2,221	2,090	1,825	1,852	Naguilian
Palawan	456	437	411	335	364	San Guillermo
Paliueg	1,380	1,212	1,106	933	839	Ilagan
Palutan	968	860	875	848	747	San Mariano
Panang	747	729	684	596	623	San Agustin
Panecien	395	415	299	299	319	Aurora
Pangal Norte	1,428	1,370	1,465	1,266	1,233	Echague
Pangal Sur	1,285	1,250	1,029	972	1,042	Echague
Panninan	597	569	586	457	420	San Mariano
Papan Este	723	693	668	555	576	Jones
Papan Weste	339	330	309	287	267	Jones
Pappat	488	470	473	387	394	Angadanan
Paragu	1,145	1,112	1,099	974	916	Tumauini
Paraiso	1,008	863	703	634	519	Cabatuan
Pasa	845	807	725	588	539	Ilagan
Patanad	665	645	541	553	531	San Isidro
Patul	4,621	3,218	2,805	2,404	1,619	Santiago
Payac	1,276	1,207	1,143	920	1,007	Jones
Pilar	794	730	637	537	516	Ilagan
Pilig Abajo	820	797	800	694	648	Cabagan
Pilig Alto	1,223	1,341	1,350	1,105	1,200	Cabagan
Pilitan	1,393	1,417	1,305	1,171	1,016	Tumauini
Pinoma	3,430	3,153	3,042	2,931	2,826	Cauayan
Pintor	1,333	1,301	1,292	1,063	1,123	Gamu
Pisang	609	564	415	413	400	San Manuel
Pissay	448	499	568	521	551	Angadanan
Placer	476	455	396	351	228	Benito Soliven
Planas	2,749	2,364	2,236	1,629	1,619	Ramon
Plaridel	6,531	4,799	4,184	4,361	3,895	Santiago
Poblacion	731	700	624	585	713	San Pablo
Poblacion 1	1,504	1,360	1,506	1,404	1,496	Santa Maria
Poblacion 2	653	562	612	776	582	Santa Maria
Poblacion 3	1,421	1,275	1,321	1,153	1,044	Santa Maria
Pongpongan	449	448	457	381	401	Jones
Progreso	540	373	354	371	297	San Guillermo
Pulay	1,007	966	960	821	822	Luna
Punit	771	738	676	651	570	Benito Soliven
Puroc	1,420	1,156	1,126	1,108	1,107	Luna
Purok ni Bulan	577	531	513	444	386	Ramon
Quezon	3,179	2,889	2,333	1,604	994	San Isidro
Quezon (Centro Norte Este)	940	872	820	646	712	Cordon
Quezon (Poblacion)	1,503	1,604	1,748	1,525	1,608	Naguilian
Quibal	455	396	431	441	406	Delfin Albano (Magsaysay)
Quiling	1,356	1,302	1,103	1,126	1,065	Roxas
Quimalabasa	315	297	272	230	175	Ilagan
Quimalabasa Norte	703	699	679	646	616	San Agustin
Quimalabasa Sur	452	445	441	453	463	San Agustin
Quinagabian	1,421	1,128	1,250	1,172	993	Santa Maria
Quinalabasa	561	525	449	534	486	Naguilian
Quirino (Manasin)	2,364	1,976	1,621	904	921	Cordon
Quirino (Poblacion)	2,065	2,138	2,044	1,926	1,664	Naguilian
Ragan Almacen	358	354	366	352	336	Delfin Albano (Magsaysay)
Ragan Norte	709	643	612	568	542	Delfin Albano (Magsaysay)
Ragan Sur (Poblacion)	1,657	1,754	1,636	1,439	1,471	Delfin Albano (Magsaysay)
Ramona	590	567	527	431	444	Angadanan
Ramos East	1,471	1,393	1,158	1,047	980	San Isidro
Ramos West	1,720	1,681	1,642	1,319	1,283	San Isidro
Rancho Bassit	435	481	428	370	375	Angadanan
Rang-ay	383	402	393	373	377	San Agustin
Rang-ay (Caggong)	1,786	1,491	1,262	1,100	875	Cabatuan
Rang-ayan	946	917	725	647	680	Angadanan
Rang-ayan	1,515	1,447	1,361	1,269	1,020	Mallig
Rang-ayan	1,125	966	905	751	751	Roxas
Rang-ayan (Bintacan)	1,266	1,211	935	818	741	Ilagan
Rangayan	724	646	607	530	593	Naguilian
Raniag	637	581	449	271	242	Burgos
Raniag	5,093	4,622	3,966	3,283	2,990	Ramon
Reina Mercedes	448	408	457	361	208	Maconacon
Rizal	3,760	3,690	3,678	3,336	3,358	Alicia
Rizal	579	587	651	541	546	Cauayan
Rizal	271	260	213	291	149	Gamu
Rizal	360	357	292	288	119	Naguilian
Rizal	770	712	657	575	565	Quirino
Rizal	1,297	890	711	598	638	San Guillermo
Rizal	12,709	11,736	10,369	8,289	7,482	Santiago
Rizal (Poblacion)	5,502	5,368	5,133	4,888	3,849	Roxas
Rizal (Ragan Almacen Alto)	1,264	1,303	1,267	1,181	1,121	Delfin Albano (Magsaysay)
Rizal East (Poblacion)	1,911	1,938	1,658	1,448	1,278	San Isidro
Rizal West (Poblacion)	909	830	933	736	802	San Isidro
Rizaluna	1,568	1,393	1,222	1,105	763	Alicia
Rizaluna (Lapuz)	865	873	803	735	709	Aurora
Rizaluna (Rizaluna Oeste)	2,792	2,571	2,384	1,952	1,842	Cordon
Rogus	1,575	1,294	1,016	870	817	Cauayan
Rosario	11,364	10,199	8,745	7,507	5,685	Santiago
Roxas (Poblacion)	1,792	1,663	1,715	1,636	1,670	Naguilian
Roxas Poblacion (Centro Sur)	960	996	770	788	933	Cordon
Rugao	1,067	1,153	–	934	974	Ilagan
Rumang-ay	527	526	511	461	394	Echague
Sagana	3,667	2,958	1,726	1,289	962	Santiago
Sagat	1,474	1,555	1,423	1,239	1,092	Cordon
Salay	653	670	693	682	633	Angadanan
Salay	826	775	651	532	515	Echague
Salay	1,104	1,053	960	902	809	San Agustin
Salindingan	1,119	1,043	880	831	780	Ilagan
Salinungan East	2,550	2,352	2,203	2,097	2,072	San Mateo
Salinungan West	5,266	5,474	5,262	4,492	4,274	San Mateo
Salucong	440	381	355	288	320	Reina Mercedes
Salvacion	1,542	1,528	1,385	1,186	1,049	Alicia
Salvacion	702	617	473	439	432	Echague
Salvador	1,687	1,792	1,361	1,244	1,155	Santiago
Samonte (Poblacion)	1,732	1,664	1,414	1,266	1,224	Quezon
Sampaloc	2,810	2,675	2,534	2,412	1,988	Cabatuan
San Ambrocio	400	387	340	269	283	Angadanan
San Andres	565	550	569	498	461	Aurora
San Andres	610	571	539	572	583	Delfin Albano (Magsaysay)
San Andres	879	974	789	577	657	San Mateo
San Andres	1,371	1,290	1,102	1,005	688	Santiago
San Andres (Angarilla)	966	873	729	644	673	Ilagan
San Andres (Teodoro Abad)	1,618	1,731	1,626	1,385	1,361	Cabatuan
San Antonio	1,488	1,268	1,182	967	697	Cabagan
San Antonio	2,563	2,321	2,049	2,013	1,851	Cauayan
San Antonio	2,895	2,853	2,586	2,489	2,390	Delfin Albano (Magsaysay)
San Antonio	690	690	641	559	614	Jones
San Antonio	1,703	1,489	1,171	1,000	825	Ramon
San Antonio	3,542	3,086	2,818	2,240	2,244	Roxas
San Antonio	469	527	494	442	350	San Agustin
San Antonio	1,102	1,090	869	841	784	San Mateo
San Antonio	1,327	1,206	1,258	1,140	1,056	Santa Maria
San Antonio (Poblacion)	2,058	2,150	2,130	1,917	1,919	Alicia
San Antonio Minit	976	1,036	834	828	751	Echague
San Antonio Ugad	558	496	382	561	235	Echague
San Bernardo	2,232	2,211	2,178	1,888	1,941	Cabagan
San Bonifacio	1,079	1,090	946	799	716	Burgos
San Carlos	578	366	296	278	183	Benito Soliven
San Carlos	1,010	944	730	575	523	Echague
San Fabian	3,149	2,955	2,602	2,112	1,997	Echague
San Felipe	1,225	1,110	920	814	613	Echague
San Felipe	991	924	835	812	767	Ilagan
San Fermin	10,070	9,121	8,733	7,833	6,110	Cauayan
San Fernando	1,373	1,372	1,276	1,140	1,131	Alicia
San Francisco	1,224	1,047	1,055	954	842	Alicia
San Francisco	528	515	424	435	378	Benito Soliven
San Francisco	2,267	2,180	1,866	1,467	1,532	Cauayan
San Francisco	558	543	501	487	430	San Manuel
San Francisco Norte	460	413	240	210	107	San Guillermo
San Francisco Sur	350	252	208	114	101	San Guillermo
San Guillermo	192	168	162	158	167	Angadanan
San Ignacio	1,028	963	873	735	696	San Mateo
San Ignacio (Canapi)	2,496	2,702	2,591	2,260	1,884	Ilagan
San Isidro	504	468	418	440	402	Angadanan
San Isidro	1,086	916	834	769	680	Cauayan
San Isidro	513	520	525	482	417	Delfin Albano (Magsaysay)
San Isidro	1,312	1,149	1,097	995	1,032	Ilagan
San Isidro	1,190	1,035	1,004	896	831	Jones
San Isidro	334	341	311	333	341	Luna
San Isidro	754	698	569	436	214	Palanan
San Isidro	397	378	340	254	224	Quirino
San Isidro	848	762	592	538	483	Santiago
San Isidro East	1,010	898	872	903	769	Santa Maria
San Isidro West	984	996	1,010	1,046	856	Santa Maria
San Jose	1,082	1,101	1,110	1,132	1,112	Delfin Albano (Magsaysay)
San Jose	431	413	343	281	313	Jones
San Jose	786	785	791	727	687	Quirino
San Jose	1,396	1,241	1,174	1,072	867	Roxas
San Jose	2,235	1,708	1,551	1,528	1,426	San Mariano
San Jose	1,385	1,300	1,397	1,151	1,167	San Pablo
San Jose	1,032	795	676	592	525	Santiago
San Jose (Poblacion)	496	697	571	601	645	Aurora
San Jose Norte I	2,141	2,126	1,987	1,700	1,673	Mallig
San Jose Norte II	2,094	2,051	2,046	1,779	1,705	Mallig
San Jose Sur	1,659	1,570	1,402	1,460	1,443	Mallig
San Juan	1,704	1,611	1,516	1,391	1,168	Alicia
San Juan	2,137	2,310	2,317	1,717	1,984	Cabagan
San Juan	1,735	1,794	1,565	1,490	1,259	Delfin Albano (Magsaysay)
San Juan	1,094	869	930	845	798	Echague
San Juan	1,669	1,569	1,508	1,276	1,199	Ilagan
San Juan	1,322	1,110	994	658	447	Quezon
San Juan	2,024	1,873	1,801	1,749	1,678	Quirino
San Juan (Poblacion)	1,647	1,613	1,611	1,631	1,419	Aurora
San Juan (San Juan Este)	662	727	815	719	628	Cordon
San Lorenzo	1,043	1,045	906	799	690	Ilagan
San Luis	2,201	2,096	2,003	1,895	1,935	Cauayan
San Luis	1,351	1,281	1,091	961	909	Roxas
San Macario	485	420	389	320	354	Delfin Albano (Magsaysay)
San Manuel	1,294	1,330	1,150	1,128	1,038	Echague
San Manuel	2,120	1,915	1,787	1,483	1,309	Naguilian
San Manuel	1,708	1,577	1,443	1,299	1,164	San Mateo
San Marcelo	448	451	398	343	386	Angadanan
San Marcos	1,469	1,388	1,230	1,151	1,096	San Mateo
San Mariano Norte	244	224	157	146	130	San Guillermo
San Mariano Sur	552	532	463	347	269	San Guillermo
San Mateo	1,380	1,304	1,317	1,131	1,122	Quirino
San Mateo	1,993	2,105	1,924	1,676	1,712	Tumauini
San Miguel	1,378	1,225	1,209	950	853	Burgos
San Miguel	601	555	506	530	411	Echague
San Miguel	1,076	948	832	710	583	Luna
San Miguel	4,535	3,815	3,613	3,242	2,643	Ramon
San Nicolas (Fusi)	703	646	603	497	405	Delfin Albano (Magsaysay)
San Pablo	994	928	837	858	752	Alicia
San Pablo	322	306	258	235	203	Ilagan
San Pablo	823	740	699	605	658	San Mariano
San Pablo (Casap Hacienda)	1,650	1,488	1,396	1,254	1,162	Cauayan
San Patricio	525	516	570	545	554	Delfin Albano (Magsaysay)
San Pedro	2,000	1,920	1,900	1,709	1,667	Alicia
San Pedro	1,223	1,146	1,048	870	835	Roxas
San Pedro	555	492	475	468	467	San Mariano
San Pedro	2,700	2,807	2,786	2,487	2,263	Tumauini
San Pedro-San Pablo (Poblacion)	2,322	1,994	1,960	1,854	1,765	Aurora
San Pedro (Barucbuc Sur)	1,325	1,199	1,153	1,105	1,061	Mallig
San Placido	2,295	2,142	1,731	1,460	1,505	Roxas
San Rafael	533	456	411	379	372	Aurora
San Rafael	3,261	2,772	2,289	2,023	1,995	Roxas
San Rafael	176	169	102	195	81	San Guillermo
San Rafael Abajo	596	555	515	668	529	Santo Tomas
San Rafael Alto	650	665	636	612	485	Santo Tomas
San Rafael East	564	600	545	554	502	Santa Maria
San Rafael West	644	627	620	589	573	Santa Maria
San Ramon	1,027	953	961	840	835	Aurora
San Ramon	658	624	517	523	303	Mallig
San Rodrigo	1,105	1,029	804	687	655	Ilagan
San Roque	524	474	373	364	358	Angadanan
San Roque	1,439	1,403	1,276	1,227	1,036	Burgos
San Roque	366	324	311	318	298	Delfin Albano (Magsaysay)
San Roque	230	216	252	218	227	Jones
San Roque	1,123	1,044	932	815	798	San Mateo
San Roque	1,007	956	845	839	697	Santo Tomas
San Salvador	506	484	435	354	278	Echague
San Sebastian	818	750	536	458	307	Jones
San Sebastian	1,298	1,176	1,217	1,007	1,080	Ramon
San Vicente	408	450	333	315	261	Angadanan
San Vicente	2,222	2,100	1,685	1,614	1,618	Jones
San Vicente	681	642	601	529	498	Quirino
San Vicente	1,227	1,129	1,197	1,107	1,002	Santo Tomas
San Vicente	867	638	610	700	576	Tumauini
San Vicente (Poblacion)	2,509	2,743	2,527	2,695	3,028	Ilagan
Sandiat Centro	1,678	1,544	1,499	1,426	1,324	San Manuel
Sandiat East	1,265	1,287	1,197	1,095	1,156	San Manuel
Sandiat West	2,010	1,965	1,823	1,804	1,643	San Manuel
Santa	990	990	879	783	688	Tumauini
Santa Ana	858	687	637	537	600	Echague
Santa Barbara (Poblacion)	1,357	1,382	1,263	1,643	1,657	Ilagan
Santa Catalina	880	777	721	597	501	Ilagan
Santa Catalina	825	721	618	536	493	Quirino
Santa Catalina	639	572	577	423	268	Tumauini
Santa Cruz	1,993	1,813	1,634	1,581	1,357	Alicia
Santa Cruz	1,064	984	840	725	728	Benito Soliven
Santa Cruz	560	451	461	483	310	Echague
Santa Cruz	1,333	1,265	1,100	920	639	San Manuel
Santa Filomena	2,210	2,094	1,921	1,813	1,581	San Mariano
Santa Isabel	528	396	378	327	324	Jones
Santa Isabel Norte	2,203	2,328	2,175	1,925	1,840	Ilagan
Santa Isabel Sur	4,331	4,364	4,163	3,866	3,528	Ilagan
Santa Jacinta	847	802	681	657	556	Palanan
Santa Lucia (Poblacion)	1,903	1,760	1,600	1,578	1,387	Quirino
Santa Luciana (Daburab 2)	1,736	1,760	1,674	1,214	1,095	Cauayan
Santa Maria	573	588	490	465	378	Alicia
Santa Maria	1,001	834	783	807	730	Cauayan
Santa Maria	1,079	849	827	760	687	Echague
Santa Maria (Cabeseria 8)	1,159	1,015	899	733	841	Ilagan
Santa Marina (Dianggo)	248	285	264	286	105	Maconacon
Santa Monica	913	849	819	750	714	Echague
Santa Rita	1,960	1,876	1,620	1,521	1,259	Aurora
Santa Rosa	961	777	893	964	1,008	Aurora
Santa Rosa	605	564	431	422	355	Santiago
Santa Victoria	1,265	1,219	1,034	919	794	Ilagan
Santa Victoria (Villa Capuchino)	521	448	340	398	352	Naguilian
Santa Visitacion (Maggayu)	909	872	895	1,234	910	Tumauini
Santiago	438	415	363	354	372	Benito Soliven
Santiago	1,539	1,451	1,274	1,151	907	Quirino
Santiago	906	836	840	754	718	Reina Mercedes
Santo Domingo	1,398	1,394	1,383	1,257	1,198	Alicia
Santo Domingo	1,319	1,236	1,094	932	935	Echague
Santo Domingo	1,431	1,486	1,209	1,083	844	Jones
Santo Domingo	1,257	991	977	892	866	Luna
Santo Domingo	2,490	2,454	2,430	2,264	2,155	Quirino
Santo Niño	679	687	655	625	626	Angadanan
Santo Niño	1,442	1,385	1,198	1,037	918	San Agustin
Santo Niño	1,254	1,113	1,097	921	919	Tumauini
Santo Rosario	716	684	685	579	483	Delfin Albano (Magsaysay)
Santo Tomas	1,890	1,826	1,778	1,731	1,586	Alicia
Santo Tomas	884	806	788	721	632	Ilagan
Santo Tomas	677	647	539	552	580	Naguilian
Santor	649	657	631	586	502	Delfin Albano (Magsaysay)
Santor	1,260	1,142	1,054	940	876	Reina Mercedes
Santos	825	483	431	388	381	San Agustin
Santos (Poblacion)	3,002	2,818	2,498	2,284	1,867	Quezon
Sapinit	280	241	237	117	105	Divilacan
Saranay	207	208	159	191	174	Angadanan
Saranay	514	497	456	366	346	Aurora
Saranay	3,309	3,088	2,691	2,391	1,994	Cabatuan
Saui	487	596	559	476	552	Cabagan
Sevillana	304	308	263	235	176	Benito Soliven
Siempre Viva Norte	1,784	1,808	2,018	1,072	1,211	Mallig
Siempre Viva Sur	1,964	1,864	1,575	1,666	1,525	Mallig
Siffu	1,317	1,319	1,259	1,079	1,181	Ilagan
Silauan Norte (Poblacion)	1,690	1,602	1,580	1,528	1,336	Echague
Silauan Sur (Poblacion)	1,842	1,740	1,892	1,656	1,806	Echague
Sili	778	752	592	520	493	Aurora
Sillawit	2,889	2,718	2,839	2,492	2,109	Cauayan
Simanu Norte	1,870	1,860	1,726	1,445	1,412	San Pablo
Simanu Sur	737	713	683	585	540	San Pablo
Simimbaan	2,951	2,576	2,627	2,423	2,207	Roxas
Sinabbaran	348	377	356	326	238	Angadanan
Sinabbaran	1,156	1,093	1,006	882	820	Echague
Sinait	394	377	370	369	355	Quirino
Sinalugan	557	585	424	362	270	San Guillermo
Sinamar	1,702	1,520	1,530	1,368	1,201	Roxas
Sinamar Norte	3,998	4,088	3,711	3,258	3,398	San Mateo
Sinamar Sur	1,955	1,694	1,823	1,529	1,469	San Mateo
Sinaoangan Norte	566	493	496	462	495	San Agustin
Sinaoangan Sur	525	560	614	484	485	San Agustin
Sindon Bayabo	2,010	1,810	1,601	1,210	1,219	Ilagan
Sindon Maride	635	578	625	460	531	Ilagan
Sinili	1,335	1,288	1,005	857	780	Santiago
Sinipit	383	333	325	280	325	Benito Soliven
Sinippil	275	255	291	231	226	Cauayan
Sinippil	1,152	1,084	964	740	848	Reina Mercedes
Sinippil	233	222	177	160	62	Tumauini
Sinsayon	3,246	3,142	2,759	2,273	1,843	Santiago
Sipay	517	494	431	396	357	Ilagan
Sisim Abajo	158	117	131	112	123	Tumauini
Sisim Alto	797	847	662	566	574	Tumauini
Songsong	1,271	1,229	920	860	482	Gamu
Sotero Nuesa	5,340	5,012	3,836	3,485	2,422	Roxas
Soyung	2,926	2,808	2,908	2,708	2,534	Echague
Suerte	644	585	587	510	489	Quirino
Sunlife	533	513	443	422	400	Naguilian
Surcoc	1,365	1,368	1,233	1,156	1,170	Naguilian
Tagaran	4,015	2,967	2,534	1,860	1,426	Cauayan
Taggappan	1,713	1,739	1,927	1,886	1,906	Echague
Taliktik	1,526	1,378	1,291	1,007	755	Cordon
Tallag	1,911	1,757	1,773	1,042	1,580	Cabagan
Tallungan (Poblacion)	1,662	1,599	1,616	1,432	1,339	Reina Mercedes
Tandul	1,802	1,783	1,655	1,510	1,358	Cabatuan
Tangcul	1,120	1,053	995	911	816	Ilagan
Tanggal	799	795	783	657	507	Cordon
Tappa	861	742	705	582	486	San Mariano
Tarinsing	1,381	1,262	1,179	994	1,012	Cordon
Tomines	283	289	238	303	308	Naguilian
Trinidad	309	256	220	229	125	Mallig
Tuguegarao	2,122	2,160	1,644	1,421	1,370	Echague
Tunggui	634	573	541	482	441	Tumauini
Tupa (San Vicente)	1,826	1,741	1,382	1,278	1,181	San Pablo
Tupax	533	513	534	515	522	Jones
Turayong	3,041	2,921	2,532	2,181	1,976	Cauayan
Turod	850	760	669	621	481	Quezon
Turod	2,719	2,413	2,200	1,971	1,752	Reina Mercedes
Turod Norte	1,219	1,042	1,146	983	1,054	Cordon
Turod Sur	3,697	3,274	3,244	2,783	2,407	Cordon
Uauang-Galicia	–	–	74	64	44	Santo Tomas
Uauang-Tuliao	126	124	211	372	344	Santo Tomas
Ueg	1,774	1,465	1,176	1,126	989	San Mariano
Ugad	2,092	2,067	1,770	1,532	1,417	Cabagan
Ugad	2,344	2,168	1,994	1,597	1,502	Tumauini
Union	664	568	492	403	344	Cabagan
Union	1,262	1,130	1,045	1,006	963	Cauayan
Union	1,069	1,037	1,046	903	936	Gamu
Union Kalinga	377	373	307	278	219	Luna
Upi	5,104	5,512	5,198	4,656	3,061	Gamu
Usol	1,663	1,444	1,382	1,383	1,635	Jones
Victoria	1,550	1,603	1,345	1,148	1,092	Alicia
Victoria	506	472	428	414	411	Aurora
Victoria	1,070	1,009	1,019	965	899	Mallig
Victoria	1,637	1,490	1,147	932	756	San Isidro
Victoria	4,640	4,470	4,132	3,500	3,824	San Mateo
Victory	339	340	244	189	196	Angadanan
Victory Norte	5,055	6,180	5,925	5,892	6,579	Santiago
Victory Sur	2,166	2,279	2,409	2,416	2,472	Santiago
Viga	1,697	1,613	1,596	1,397	1,462	Angadanan
Villa Bello	532	466	372	233	170	Jones
Villa Beltran	804	713	737	682	598	Ramon
Villa Bulusan	295	281	221	245	221	Quirino
Villa Campo	806	451	496	507	298	Echague
Villa Carmen	1,279	1,267	1,215	849	806	Ramon
Villa Concepcion	3,244	3,349	3,239	2,938	2,873	Cauayan
Villa Concepcion	1,112	1,060	995	901	867	Roxas
Villa Cruz	1,356	1,117	1,191	955	946	San Mateo
Villa Domingo	1,273	1,137	1,068	816	882	Angadanan
Villa Fermin	879	779	674	524	498	Echague
Villa Fugu	902	865	697	633	578	Aurora
Villa Gamiao (Buyon)	697	684	602	555	554	San Mateo
Villa Gonzaga	1,619	1,410	1,193	952	835	Santiago
Villa Imelda (Maplas)	959	956	642	523	447	Ilagan
Villa Luna	1,720	1,736	1,470	1,340	1,257	Cauayan
Villa Luz	981	914	846	709	573	Delfin Albano (Magsaysay)
Villa Magat	822	812	763	626	575	San Mateo
Villa Marcos	1,157	697	490	480	443	Ramon
Villa Miguel (Ugak)	711	683	546	577	500	Quirino
Villa Nuesa	303	310	311	278	291	Aurora
Villa Paz	1,360	1,336	1,180	1,119	1,036	Naguilian
Villa Pereda	622	545	492	456	388	Delfin Albano (Magsaysay)
Villa Remedios	260	223	174	170	115	San Guillermo
Villa Rey	411	223	224	270	254	Echague
Villa Robles	780	751	704	557	489	Palanan
Villa Rose	689	576	358	330	249	San Guillermo
Villa Sanchez	493	461	345	294	250	San Guillermo
Villa Teresita	340	355	209	183	176	San Guillermo
Villa Victoria	403	279	304	259	256	Echague
Villabuena	788	567	663	570	437	Santa Maria
Villador	1,014	958	826	771	728	Reina Mercedes
Villaflor	418	375	320	259	204	Cauayan
Villaflor	1,946	1,811	1,569	1,419	1,300	San Isidro
Villafuerte	1,827	1,898	1,790	1,675	1,715	San Mateo
Villaluz	2,019	1,965	1,735	1,625	1,626	Benito Soliven
Villamarzo	1,768	1,641	1,494	1,361	1,209	Cordon
Villamiemban	731	721	566	519	406	Cordon
Villanueva	1,497	1,473	1,460	1,353	1,401	San Manuel
Villasis	1,584	2,093	2,059	2,397	2,334	Santiago
Vintar	874	808	778	755	631	Quirino
Vira (Poblacion)	3,855	3,440	3,497	3,505	3,218	Roxas
Virgoneza	939	896	865	818	867	San Agustin
Visitacion	495	477	518	458	449	Delfin Albano (Magsaysay)
Wigan	2,239	2,272	1,972	1,714	1,518	Cordon
Yeban Norte	2,190	2,114	1,966	1,823	1,896	Benito Soliven
Yeban Sur	1,537	1,402	1,308	1,156	1,105	Benito Soliven
Zamora	906	892	736	706	481	Alicia
Zamora	397	358	336	312	283	San Mariano
Zone I (Poblacion)	1,566	1,633	1,526	1,410	1,690	San Mariano
Zone II (Poblacion)	2,133	1,919	2,199	2,213	2,267	San Mariano
Zone III (Poblacion)	3,433	3,438	3,341	3,297	3,434	San Mariano
Barangay	2010	2007	2000	1995	1990	City or municipality
*Italicized names are former names.; *Dashes (–) in cells indicate unavailable census data.

[top]
