= San Guillermo =

Municipality in Isabela, Philippines

- Municipality
- Municipality of San Guillermo
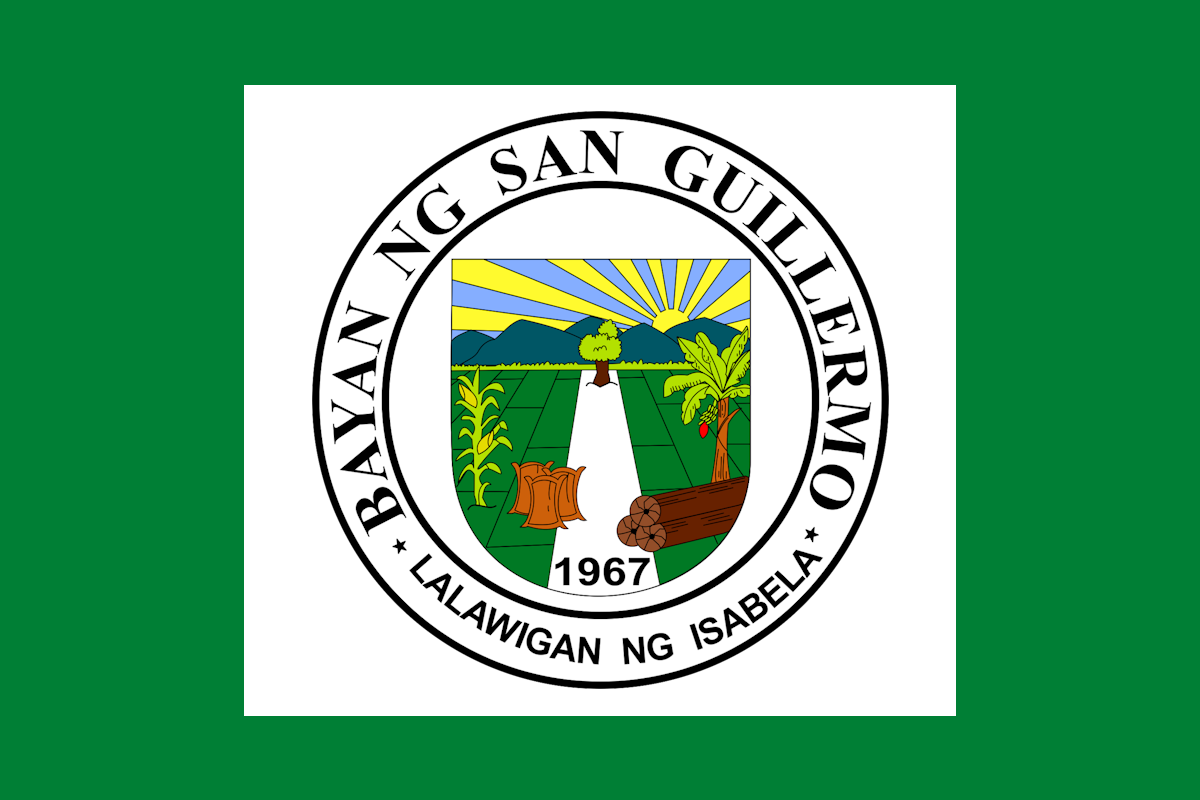
- Flag Seal

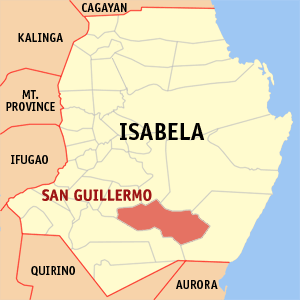
- Map of Isabela with San Guillermo highlighted
- Interactive map of San Guillermo
- Location within the Philippines
- Coordinates: 16°43′28″N 121°48′36″E
- Country: Philippines
- Region: Cagayan Valley
- Province: Isabela
- District: 6th district
- Founded: June 17, 1967
- Named for: Eugenio Guillermo and Saint William of Maleval
- Barangays: 26 (see Barangays)

Government
  - Type: Sangguniang Bayan
  - Mayor: Felipe N. Guyud, Jr.
  - Vice Mayor: Bernadine M. Lucas
  - Representative: Faustino Dy III
  - Electorate: 13,806 voters (2025)

Area
  - Total: 325.49 km^{2} (125.67 sq mi)
- Elevation: 88 m (289 ft)
- Highest elevation: 128 m (420 ft)
- Lowest elevation: 43 m (141 ft)

Population (2024 census)
  - Total: 21,043
  - Density: 64.650/km^{2} (167.44/sq mi)
  - Households: 4,989

Economy
  - Income class: 2nd municipal income class
  - Poverty incidence: 19.02% (2023)
  - Revenue: ₱ 203 million (2024)
  - Assets: ₱ 587.8 million (2024)
  - Expenditure: ₱ 141.8 million (2024)
  - Liabilities: ₱ 90.51 million (2024)

Service provider
  - Electricity: Isabela 1 Electric Cooperative (ISELCO 1)
- Time zone: UTC+8 (PST)
- ZIP code: 3308
- PSGC: 0203128000
- IDD : area code: +63 (0)78
- Native languages: Ilocano; Tagalog
- Website: www.sanguillermo-isabela.gov.ph

San Guillermo (Spanish for Saint William), officially the Municipality of San Guillermo, is a municipality in the province of Isabela, Philippines. According to the 2024 census, it has a population of 21,043 people.

== Etymology ==
The town was named after Eugenio Guillermo, former mayor of Angadanan.

== History ==
On June 17, 1967, the municipality of San Guillermo was created by virtue of Republic Act No. 4906, sponsored by Melanio Singson, the then-representative of Isabela's lone district. It used to consist of 15 barangays from Angadanan (i.e. Anonang, Colorado, Calaoagan, Dipacamo, Peredo Edcor, Guam, Nakar, Palawan, Progreso, San Francisco Norte, San Mariano Norte, San Mariano Sur, Villa Rose, Villa Sanchez, and Villa Teresita) and four from Echague (i.e. Aringay, Dingading, San Francisco Sur and Sinalugan).

Due to a noticeable increase in the rate of population migration and potential economic growth, additional barangays were created during the term of Mayor Alvaro Filart, such as barangays Burgos, Dietban, Estrella, Rizal, San Rafael and Villa Remedios. Subsequently, barangay Peredo Edcor was split into two barangays, namely: Centro 1 and Centro 2, which is now the poblacion and the municipality's official seat.

== Geography ==
San Guillermo is situated 69.94 kilometres (43.46 mi) from the provincial capital Ilagan, and 399.93 kilometres (248.50 mi) from the country's capital city of Manila.

=== Barangays ===
San Guillermo is politically subdivided into 26 barangays. Each barangay consists of puroks while some have sitios.

- Anonang
- Aringay
- Burgos
- Calaoagan
- Centro 1 (Poblacion)
- Centro 2 (Poblacion)
- Colorado
- Dietban
- Dingading
- Dipacamo
- Estrella
- Guam
- Nakar
- Palawan
- Progreso
- Rizal
- San Francisco Norte
- San Francisco Sur
- San Mariano Norte
- San Mariano Sur
- San Rafael
- Sinalugan
- Villa Remedios
- Villa Rose
- Villa Sanchez
- Villa Teresita

=== Climate ===
Climate data for San Guillermo, Isabela
Month	Jan	Feb	Mar	Apr	May	Jun	Jul	Aug	Sep	Oct	Nov	Dec	Year
Mean daily maximum °C (°F)	29 (84)	30 (86)	32 (90)	35 (95)	35 (95)	35 (95)	34 (93)	33 (91)	32 (90)	31 (88)	30 (86)	28 (82)	32 (90)
Mean daily minimum °C (°F)	19 (66)	20 (68)	21 (70)	23 (73)	23 (73)	24 (75)	23 (73)	23 (73)	23 (73)	22 (72)	21 (70)	20 (68)	22 (71)
Average precipitation mm (inches)	31.2 (1.23)	23 (0.9)	27.7 (1.09)	28.1 (1.11)	113.5 (4.47)	141.4 (5.57)	176.4 (6.94)	236.6 (9.31)	224.9 (8.85)	247.7 (9.75)	222.9 (8.78)	178 (7.0)	1,651.4 (65)
Average rainy days	10	6	5	5	13	12	15	15	15	17	16	15	144
Source: World Weather Online

== Demographics ==
Population census of San Guillermo
Year	Pop.	±% p.a.
1970	9,970	—
1975	5,573	−11.01%
1980	6,985	+4.62%
1990	10,700	+4.36%
1995	12,506	+2.97%
2000	13,338	+1.39%
2007	16,865	+3.29%
2010	18,423	+3.27%
2015	20,200	+1.77%
2020	20,915	+0.73%
2024	21,043	+0.15%
Source: Philippine Statistics Authority

In the 2024 census, the population of San Guillermo was 21,043 people, with a density of 65 inhabitants per square kilometre or 170 inhabitants per square mile.

== Economy ==
Poverty incidence of San Guillermo (%)

Source: Philippine Statistics Authority

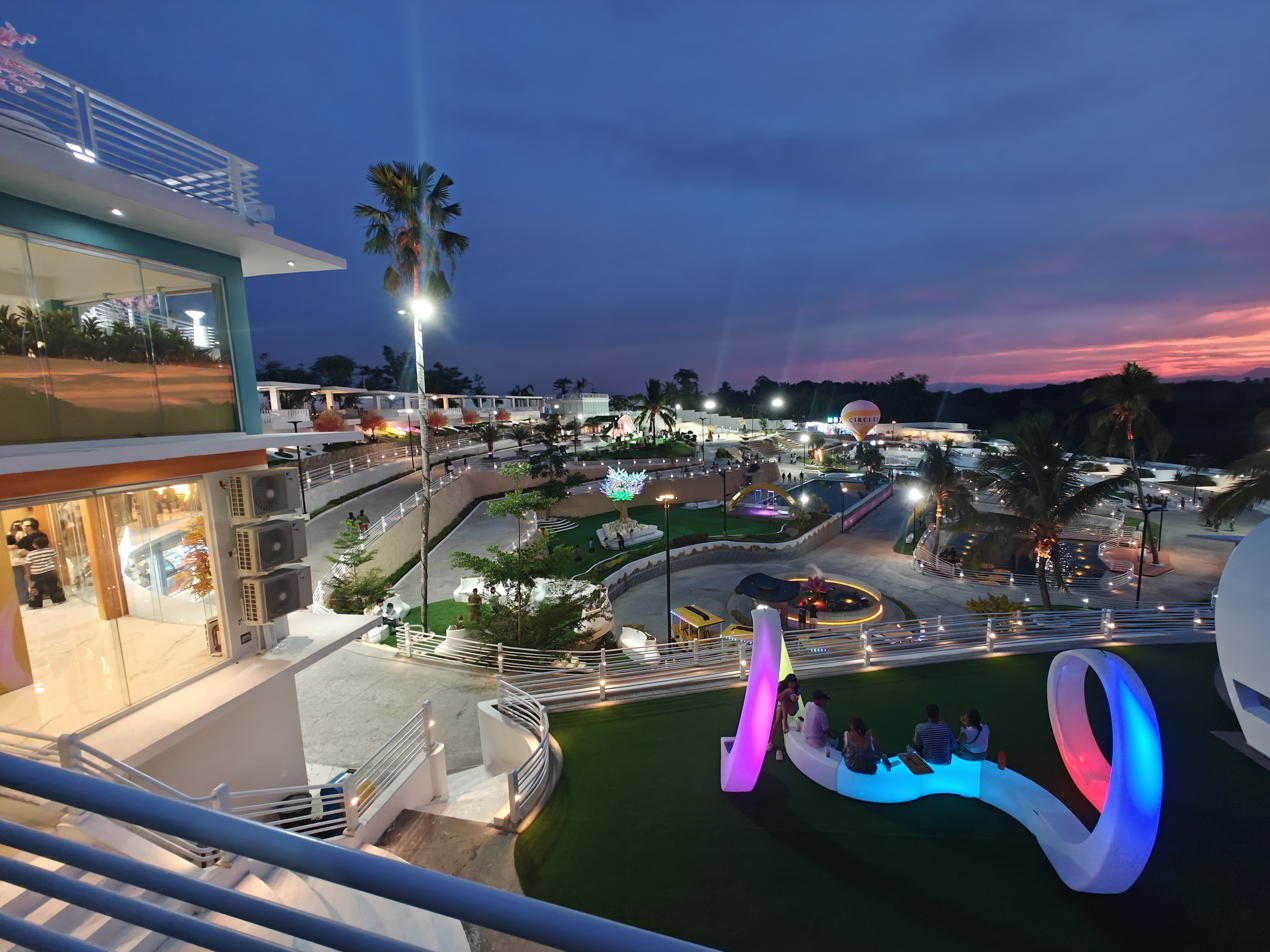
Circles Resort, a tourism enterprise zone in San Guillermo

Socioeconomic metrics indicate that San Guillermo operates formally as a fourth-income-class municipality within the Philippines. According to the Philippine Statistics Authority, the municipality recorded a poverty incidence rate of 22.09 percent in 2021 among its registered population. A measurable portion of the community experiences persistent food insecurity, prompting the direct intervention of national social welfare initiatives. The Department of Social Welfare and Development included San Guillermo in its Walang Gutom program, which distributes food credits to targeted households to mitigate hunger and malnutrition. Local economic planning aims to address these poverty metrics by promoting domestic investments in poultry production, commercial crop cultivation, and regulated forest management. The municipal government generates revenue from local business taxes, agricultural trade, and national tax allotments to fund administrative and social services aimed at supporting the local workforce. Financial records for the municipality show reliance on these combined revenue streams to sustain public works and poverty alleviation programs across its twenty-six constituent barangays.

The local economy relies heavily on agricultural production and forestry as its primary sources of livelihood. Data from the municipal government indicates that the local agricultural sector focuses on the cultivation of corn, bananas, and pineapples. These crops are harvested and subsequently distributed to neighboring municipalities and regional market centers. Local farming operations vary, ranging from small subsistence agriculture to larger organized commercial crop production. To improve farm efficiency and output, national government agencies provide structural support and technical training to local agricultural workers. The Department of Agrarian Reform established a Farm Business School in the municipality to train groups such as the Estrella Danggayan Agrarian Reform Beneficiaries Cooperative. This educational program teaches farmers resource allocation, systematic farm planning, and business management techniques to transition their operations into financially viable agro-industrial enterprises. Livestock and poultry raising also contribute to the local agricultural output, providing secondary income streams for rural households. The integration of modern farming techniques seeks to establish food security and steady revenue for the local agrarian workforce.

The topography of San Guillermo dictates its specific economic activities and structural land use patterns. The local government reports that the municipality covers a total land area of 45,370 hectares characterized largely by a mountainous, hilly, and rugged landscape. This specific slope classification supports the planting of various fruit-bearing trees and facilitates organized ranching activities across the terrain. The municipal administration identifies the local forested areas as accessible sources of timber, rattan, and bamboo. Commercial timber production and agro-forestry form a core component of the local livelihood, generating revenue for both the municipality and individual laborers. Geographic constraints and inadequate infrastructure routinely affect economic movement within the territory. The presence of underdeveloped roads and bridges complicates the ability of farmers in rural barangays to transport their harvested goods to centralized market centers. Improving these farm-to-market road networks remains a target for local government development in order to facilitate the steady trade of agricultural and forest products. The terrain, while providing natural resources, necessitates continued infrastructure funding to maintain economic stability.

== Government ==
=== Local government ===
As a municipality in the Province of Isabela, government officials at the provincial and municipal levels are voted by the town. The provincial government has political jurisdiction over most local transactions of the municipal government.

The Municipality of San Guillermo is governed by a mayor, designated as its local chief executive, and by a municipal council as its legislative body in accordance with the Local Government Code. The mayor, vice mayor, and the municipal councilors are elected directly through elections held every three years.

Barangays are also headed by elected officials: Barangay Captain, Barangay Council, whose members are called Barangay Councilors. The barangays have SK federation which represents the barangay, headed by SK chairperson and whose members are called SK councilors. All officials are also elected every three years.

=== Elected officials ===
Members of the San Guillermo Municipal Council (2022-2025)
Position	Name
District Representative	Faustino Dy III
Municipal Mayor	Felipe N. Guyud, Jr.
Municipal Vice-Mayor	Bernardine M. Lucas
Municipal Councilors	Marilou N. Sanchez
Municipal Councilors	John N. Sanchez
Municipal Councilors	Harrison S. Guyud
Municipal Councilors	Jolly A. De Guzman
Municipal Councilors	Florido N. Marcos
Municipal Councilors	Ricardo G. Castañeda
Municipal Councilors	Marcelina L. Cabaero
Municipal Councilors	Emmanuel N. Guyud

=== Congress representation ===
San Guillermo, belonging to the sixth legislative district of the province of Isabela, currently represented by Hon. Faustino A. Dy V.

== Education ==
The Schools Division of Isabela governs the town's public education system. The division office is a field office of the DepEd in Cagayan Valley region. The San Guillermo Schools District Office oversees all public and private elementary and high schools within the municipality.

=== Primary and elementary schools ===
- Anonang Primary School
- Aringay Primary School
- Burgos East Elementary School
- Burgos West Elementary School
- Calaoagan Primary School
- Dilucot Primary School
- Dipacamo Elementary School
- Dipugo Primary School
- Estrella Primary School
- Guam Elementary School
- Nakar Primary School
- Progreso Elementary School
- San Francisco Norte Elementary School
- San Francisco Sur Primary School
- San Guillermo Central School
- San Mariano Norte Primary School
- San Mariano Sur Primary School
- San Rafael Primary School
- Sinag Tala Learning Center of San Guillermo
- Sinalugan Primary School
- Southern Isabela Academy (Preparatory and Elementary Department)
- Villa Remedios Primary School
- Villa Rose Elementary School
- Villa Sanchez Primary Schoo
- Villa Teresita Primary School

=== Secondary schools ===
- Colorado Integrated School
- Dietban Integrated School
- Dingading Integrated School
- Palawan Integrated School
- San Guillermo Vocational & Industrial High School
- Southern Isabela Academy (JHS and SHS)
