= Naguilian, Isabela =

Municipality in Isabela, Philippines

Naguilian
- Municipality
- Municipality of Naguilian
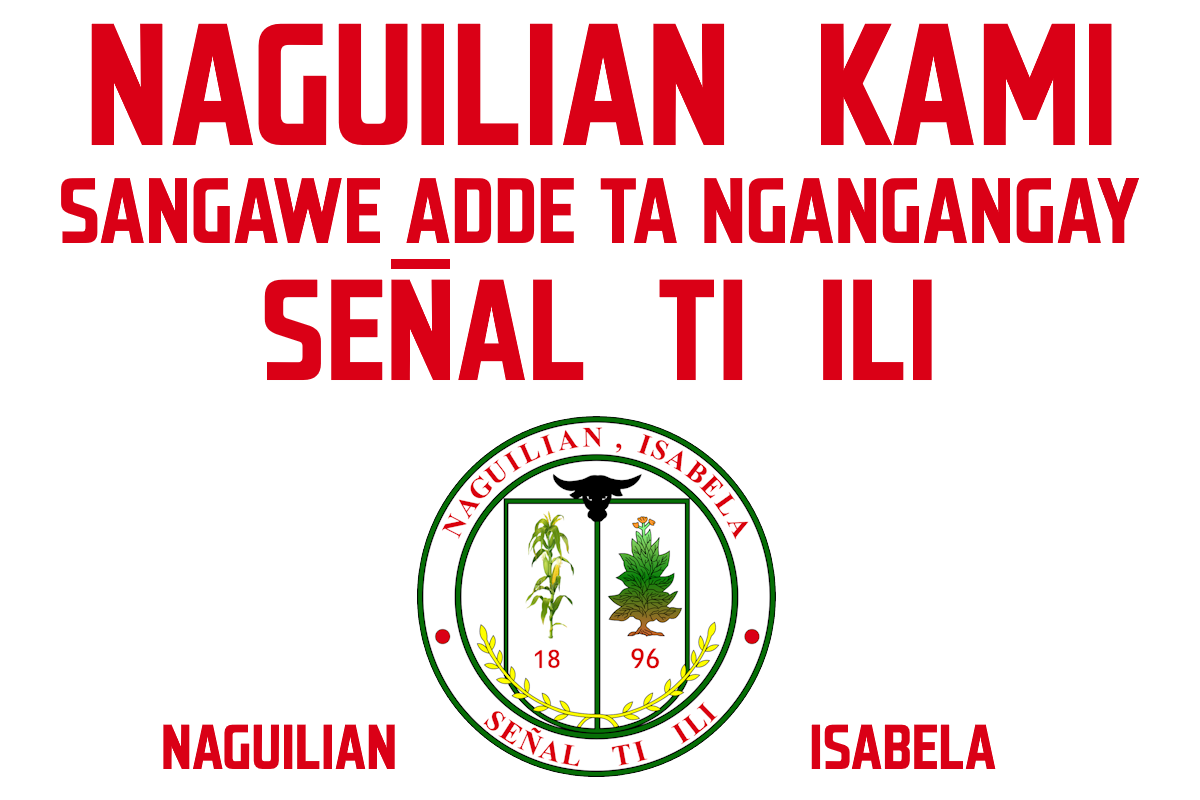
- Flag Seal

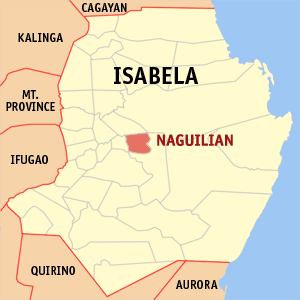
- Map of Isabela with Naguilian highlighted
- Interactive map of Naguilian
- Location within the Philippines
- Coordinates: 17°01′N 121°51′E
- Country: Philippines
- Region: Cagayan Valley
- Province: Isabela
- District: 2nd district
- Founded: 1896
- Barangays: 25 (see Barangays)

Government
  - Type: Sangguniang Bayan
  - Mayor: Juan R. Capuchino
  - Vice Mayor: Isidro D. Acosta, Jr.
  - Representative: Ed Christopher S. Go
  - Electorate: 21,382 voters (2025)

Area
  - Total: 169.81 km^{2} (65.56 sq mi)
- Elevation: 50 m (160 ft)
- Highest elevation: 96 m (315 ft)
- Lowest elevation: 29 m (95 ft)

Population (2024 census)
  - Total: 34,520
  - Density: 203.3/km^{2} (526.5/sq mi)
  - Households: 8,363

Economy
  - Income class: 1st municipal income class
  - Poverty incidence: 13.03% (2023)
  - Revenue: ₱ 221 million (2024)
  - Assets: ₱ 1,120 million (2024)
  - Expenditure: ₱ 222.9 million (2024)
  - Liabilities: ₱ 86.24 million (2024)

Service provider
  - Electricity: Isabela 2 Electric Cooperative (ISELCO 2)
- Time zone: UTC+8 (PST)
- ZIP code: 3302
- PSGC: 0203120000
- IDD : area code: +63 (0)78
- Native languages: Ilocano; Tagalog
- Website: alagaw.dict.gov.ph/~s2govnaguilliph/

Naguilian, officially the Municipality of Naguilian (Ilocano: Ili ti Naguilian; Tagalog: Bayan ng Naguilian), is a municipality in the province of Isabela, Philippines. According to the 2024 census, it has a population of 34,520 people.

== History ==
Naguilian was formerly a part of the town of Gamu before it was made a separate town by virtue of a Spanish Royal decree dated November 27, 1896.

== Geography ==
Naguilian is situated 20.36 kilometres (12.65 mi) from the provincial capital Ilagan, and 419.55 kilometres (260.70 mi) from the country's capital city of Manila.

=== Barangays ===
Naguilian is politically subdivided into 25 barangays. Each barangay consists of puroks while some have sitios.

- Aguinaldo
- Bagong Sikat
- Burgos
- Cabaruan
- Flores
- La Union
- Magsaysay (Poblacion)
- Manaring
- Mansibang
- Minallo
- Minanga
- Palattao
- Quezon (Poblacion)
- Quinalabasa
- Quirino (Poblacion)
- Rang-Ayan
- Rizal
- Roxas (Poblacion)
- San Manuel
- Santo Tomas
- Sunlife
- Surcoc
- Tomines
- Villapaz
- Villa Capuchino

=== Climate ===
Climate data for Naguilian, Isabela
Month	Jan	Feb	Mar	Apr	May	Jun	Jul	Aug	Sep	Oct	Nov	Dec	Year
Mean daily maximum °C (°F)	29 (84)	30 (86)	32 (90)	35 (95)	35 (95)	35 (95)	34 (93)	33 (91)	32 (90)	31 (88)	30 (86)	28 (82)	32 (90)
Mean daily minimum °C (°F)	19 (66)	20 (68)	21 (70)	23 (73)	23 (73)	24 (75)	23 (73)	23 (73)	23 (73)	22 (72)	21 (70)	20 (68)	22 (71)
Average precipitation mm (inches)	31.2 (1.23)	23 (0.9)	27.7 (1.09)	28.1 (1.11)	113.5 (4.47)	141.4 (5.57)	176.4 (6.94)	236.6 (9.31)	224.9 (8.85)	247.7 (9.75)	222.9 (8.78)	178 (7.0)	1,651.4 (65)
Average rainy days	10	6	5	5	13	12	15	15	15	17	16	15	144
Source: World Weather Online

== Demographics ==
Population census of Naguilian

Year	Pop.	±% p.a.
1903	3,502	—
1918	4,516	+1.71%
1939	6,871	+2.02%
1948	7,359	+0.77%
1960	13,454	+5.16%
1970	18,425	+3.19%
1975	17,897	−0.58%
1980	20,122	+2.37%

Year	Pop.	±% p.a.
1990	24,131	+1.83%
1995	24,268	+0.11%
2000	26,285	+1.73%
2007	27,977	+0.86%
2010	29,491	+1.94%
2015	31,902	+1.51%
2020	33,788	+1.22%
2024	34,520	+0.52%

Source: Philippine Statistics Authority

In the 2024 census, the population of Naguilian was 34,520 people, with a density of 200 inhabitants per square kilometre or 520 inhabitants per square mile.

== Economy ==
Poverty incidence of Naguilian (%)

Source: Philippine Statistics Authority

== Government ==
=== Local government ===
As a municipality in the province of Isabela, government officials at the provincial and municipal levels are voted by the town. The provincial government has political jurisdiction over most local transactions of the municipal government.

The Municipality of Naguilian is governed by a mayor, designated as its Local Chief Executive, and by a municipal council as its legislative body in accordance with the Local Government Code. The mayor, vice mayor, and the municipal councilors are elected directly in elections held every three years.

Barangays are also headed by elected officials: Barangay Captain, Barangay Council, whose members are called Barangay Councilors. The barangays have SK federation which represents the barangay, headed by SK chairperson and whose members are called SK councilors. All officials are also elected every three years.

List of former Municipal Mayors (1895–present)

No.	Name of Mayor	Start of Term and End of Term
1st Gobernadorcillo	Don Vicente Mondano Ramirez	1895-1898
2nd Gobernadorcillo	Don Alejandro Mondano Ramirez	1898-1899
1st Municipal President	Don Mariano Taccad Ramirez	1899-1902
2nd Municipal President	Don Martin Molinar	1903-1905
3rd Municipal President	Don Juan Carticiano Cauilan	1905-1908
4th Municipal President	Don Romualdo Guzman Mina	January 1, 1908- August 1911
5th Municipal President	Don Rufino Bumanglag	1911- 1914
6th Municipal President	Don Jacinto Montevirgen	1914-1917
7th Municipal President	Don Ramon Barcena	1917-1920
8th Municipal President	Don Wenceslao Dumaua	1920-1925
9th Municipal President	Don Nicolas Dela Cruz Borromeo	October 16, 1925- October 15, 1927
10th Municipal President	Don Domingo Montevirgen Capellan	October 16, 1927- October 15, 1928
11th Municipal President	Don Mauricio Barcelo	October 16, 1928- October 15, 1931
12th Municipal President	Don Paulino Marfil Paredes	October 16, 1931- October 15, 1934
13th Municipal President	Don Antolin Bayabos	October 16, 1934- December 31, 1936
1st Municipal Mayor	Emilio Aggari Ramirez	January 1937 – 1938 (Municipal President) January 1, 1938- December 31, 1941 January 1, 1942- December 31, 1945
2nd Municipal Mayor	Don Jose Capellan	January 1, 1946- December 31, 1947
3rd Municipal Mayor	Dionisio Guzman Mina	January 1, 1948- December 31, 1951 (elected) January 1, 1952- December 31, 1955 (re-elected)
4th Municipal Mayor	Serafin Mina Garcia	January 1, 1956- December 31, 1959 (elected) January 1, 1960- December 31, 1963 (re-elected) January 1, 1964- December 31, 1967 (re-elected)
5th Municipal Mayor	Maximo Arenas Diaz	January 1, 1968- December 31, 1971 (elected) January 1, 1972- 1977 (re-elected)
6th Municipal Mayor	Dr. Sabas Bueno Capuchino Jr.	1977- January 31, 1980 (appointed) February 1, 1980- May 1986 (elected)
7th Municipal Mayor	Francisco Bassig Ramirez Jr.	May 1986- December 1987 (appointed) February 3, 1988- June 30, 1992 (elected) July 1, 1992- June 30, 1995 (re-elected) July 1, 1995- June 30, 1998 (re-elected)
8th Municipal Mayor	Jose Antonio Rodriguez	December 1987- February 2, 1988 (appointed)
9th Municipal Mayor	Francisco Ignacio Capuchino Ramirez, III	July 1, 1998- June 30, 2001 (elected) July 1, 2001- June 30- 2004 (re-elected) July 1, 2004- June 30, 2007 (re-elected)
10th Municipal Mayor	Edgar Ramirez Capuchino	July 1, 2007- June 30, 2010 (elected) July 1, 2010- June 30, 2013 (re-elected) July 1, 2013- June 30, 2016 (re-elected)
11th Municipal Mayor	Juan Ramirez Capuchino	July 1, 2016- June 30, 2019 July 1, 2019- June 30, 2022 July 1, 2022- June 20, 2025
12th Municipal Mayor	Edgar Ramirez Capuchino	July 1, 2025- Present

=== Elected officials ===
Members of the Naguilian Municipal Council (2025–2028)
District Representative	Ed Christopher S. Go
Municipal Mayor	Edgar R. Capuchino
Municipal Vice-Mayor	Juan R. Capuchino
Municipal Councilors	Rafael Raffy M. Ramirez
Municipal Councilors	Roman Amadeo Y. Capuchino
Municipal Councilors	Bernardo P. Dela Peña
Municipal Councilors	Rommel U. Caro
Municipal Councilors	Amie Clarita M. Samonte
Municipal Councilors	Domingo G. Pablo
Municipal Councilors	Isidro D. Acosta Jr.
Municipal Councilors	Jaypee M. Rosete
Position	Name

=== Congress representation ===
Naguilian, belonging to the second legislative district of the province of Isabela, currently represented by Hon. Ed Christopher S. Go.

== Education ==
The Schools Division of Isabela governs the town's public education system. The division office is a field office of the DepEd in Cagayan Valley region. The Naguilian Schools District Office governs the public and private elementary and public and private high schools throughout the municipality.

=== Primary and elementary schools ===
- Aguinaldo Elementary School
- Bagong Sikat Elementary School
- Burgos Elementary School
- Flores Elementary School
- La Union Elementary School
- Magsaysay Primary School
- Manaring Elementary School
- Mansibang Elementary School
- Minallo Elementary School
- Minanga Elementary School
- Naguilian Adventist Elementary School
- Naguilian Central School
- Nam-ay Elementary School
- Palattao Elementary School
- Quinalabasa Elementary School
- Rang-ayan Elementary School
- Rizal Elementary School
- San Manuel Elementary School
- San Roque Elementary School
- Sta. Victoria Elementary School
- Sunlife Elementary School
- Tomines Elementary School
- Villapaz Elementary School

=== Secondary schools ===
- Cabaruan Integrated School
- Naguillian National High School
- School of Saint Joseph
- Sto. Tomas Integrated School
- Surcoc Integrated School
