= Burgos, Isabela =

Municipality in Isabela, Philippines

Burgos
- Municipality
- Municipality of Burgos
- Burgos Town Proper

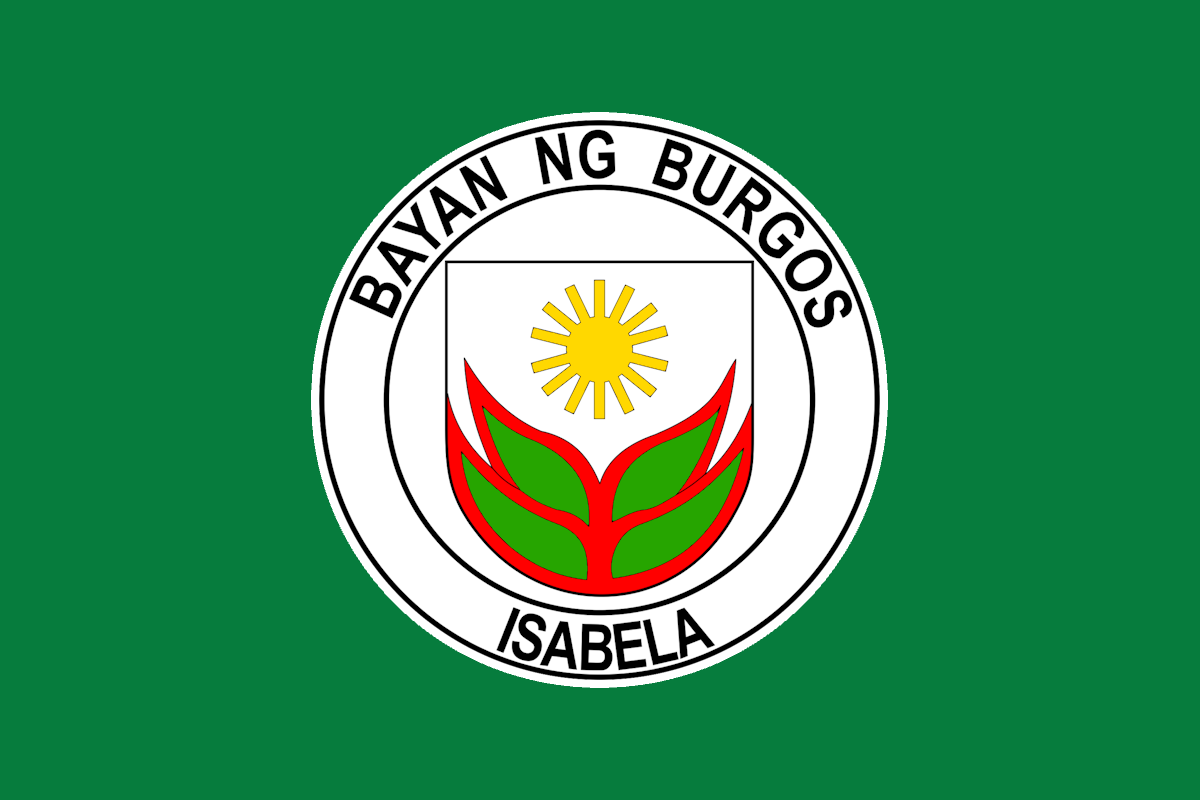
- Flag Seal

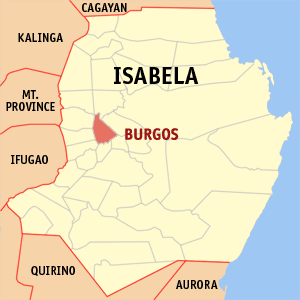
- Map of Isabela with Burgos highlighted
- Interactive map of Burgos
- Location within the Philippines
- Coordinates: 17°04′N 121°42′E
- Country: Philippines
- Region: Cagayan Valley
- Province: Isabela
- District: 5th district
- Founded: May 18, 1967
- Named for: José Burgos
- Barangays: 14 (see Barangays)

Government
  - Type: Sangguniang Bayan
  - Mayor: Isis Dominique T. Uy
  - Vice Mayor: Ruben A. Gragasin
  - Representative: Faustino Michael Carlos T. Dy III
  - Electorate: 17,190 voters (2025)

Area
  - Total: 73.10 km^{2} (28.22 sq mi)
- Elevation: 523 m (1,716 ft)
- Highest elevation: 1,498 m (4,915 ft)
- Lowest elevation: 122 m (400 ft)

Population (2024 census)
  - Total: 26,729
  - Density: 365.6/km^{2} (947.0/sq mi)
  - Households: 6,410

Economy
  - Income class: 3rd municipal income class
  - Poverty incidence: 16.38% (2023)
  - Revenue: ₱ 193.3 million (2024)
  - Assets: ₱ 896.6 million (2024)
  - Expenditure: ₱ 153 million (2024)
  - Liabilities: ₱ 234.9 million (2024)

Service provider
  - Electricity: Isabela 2 Electric Cooperative (ISELCO 2)
- Time zone: UTC+8 (PST)
- ZIP code: 3322
- PSGC: 0203105000
- IDD : area code: +63 (0)78
- Native languages: Ilocano; Tagalog
- Website: www.burgos-isabela.gov.ph

Burgos, officially the Municipality of Burgos (Ilocano: Ili ti Burgos; Tagalog: Bayan ng Burgos), is a municipality in the province of Isabela, Philippines. According to the 2024 census, it has a population of 26,729 people.

== Etymology ==
The town derived its name from the Ilocano martyr Fr. José Burgos who noted that the majority of the population is composed of Ilocanos.

== History ==
The Burgos town was established on May 18, 1967 pursuant to Republic Act No. 4877. The law sought to detach specific barrios from the municipalities of Gamu, and Aurora becoming a new municipality with its own set of officials.

== Geography ==
Burgos is 32 kilometres (20 mi) southwest of the provincial capital Ilagan, and 413.54 kilometres (256.96 mi) north of capital Manila.

=== Barangays ===
Burgos is politically subdivided into 14 barangays.. Each barangay consists of puroks while some have sitios.

Only one barangay is considered urban (highlighted in bold).

- Bacnor East
- Bacnor West
- Caliguian
- Catabban
- Cullalabo del Norte
- Cullalabo del Sur
- Dalig
- Malasin
- Masigun East
- Raniag
- **San Antonino (Poblacion)**
- San Bonifacio
- San Miguel
- San Roque

=== Climate ===
Climate data for Burgos, Isabela
| Month | Jan | Feb | Mar | Apr | May | Jun | Jul | Aug | Sep | Oct | Nov | Dec | Year |
|---|---|---|---|---|---|---|---|---|---|---|---|---|---|
| Mean daily maximum °C (°F) | 29 (84) | 30 (86) | 32 (90) | 35 (95) | 35 (95) | 35 (95) | 34 (93) | 33 (91) | 32 (90) | 31 (88) | 30 (86) | 28 (82) | 32 (90) |
| Mean daily minimum °C (°F) | 19 (66) | 20 (68) | 21 (70) | 23 (73) | 23 (73) | 24 (75) | 23 (73) | 23 (73) | 23 (73) | 22 (72) | 21 (70) | 20 (68) | 22 (71) |
| Average precipitation mm (inches) | 31.2 (1.23) | 23 (0.9) | 27.7 (1.09) | 28.1 (1.11) | 113.5 (4.47) | 141.4 (5.57) | 176.4 (6.94) | 236.6 (9.31) | 224.9 (8.85) | 247.7 (9.75) | 222.9 (8.78) | 178 (7.0) | 1,651.4 (65) |
| Average rainy days | 10 | 6 | 5 | 5 | 13 | 12 | 15 | 15 | 15 | 17 | 16 | 15 | 144 |
Source: World Weather Online

== Demographics ==
Population census of Burgos
| Year | Pop. | ±% p.a. |
|---|---|---|
| 1970 | 10,704 | — |
| 1975 | 13,259 | +4.39% |
| 1980 | 15,138 | +2.69% |
| 1990 | 17,485 | +1.45% |
| 1995 | 19,052 | +1.62% |
| 2000 | 20,422 | +1.50% |
| 2007 | 21,898 | +0.97% |
| 2010 | 22,521 | +1.03% |
| 2015 | 23,784 | +1.04% |
| 2020 | 26,040 | +1.93% |
| 2024 | 26,729 | +0.63% |
Source: Philippine Statistics Authority

In the 2024 census, the population of Burgos was 26,729 people, with a density of 370 inhabitants per square kilometre or 960 inhabitants per square mile.

== Economy ==
Poverty incidence of Burgos (%)

Source: Philippine Statistics Authority

Burgos Trade Center

Economic activities mainly consists of farming. It is one of the highest rice and corn producer among towns of Isabela province.

== Government ==
=== Local government ===
As a municipality in the Province of Isabela, government officials at the provincial and municipal levels are voted by the town. The provincial government has political jurisdiction over most local transactions of the municipal government.

The municipality of Burgos is governed by a mayor, designated as its local chief executive, and by a municipal council as its legislative body in accordance with the Local Government Code. The mayor, vice mayor, and the municipal councilors are elected directly by the people through an election held every three years.

Barangays are also headed by elected officials: Barangay Captain, Barangay Council, whose members are called Barangay Councilors. The barangays have SK federation which represents the barangay, headed by SK chairperson and whose members are called SK councilors. All officials are also elected every three years.

=== Elected officials ===
Members of the Municipal Council (2022-2025)
| Position | Name |
|---|---|
| Congressman | Faustino Michael Carlos T. Dy III |
| Mayor | Isis Dominique T. Uy |
| Vice-Mayor | Ruben A. Gragasin |
| Councilors | Elmer L. Abaya |
| Councilors | Ruben A. Tegui |
| Councilors | Matvee U. Espejo |
| Councilors | Martin S. Agtarap |
| Councilors | Emmanuel Lopez |
| Councilors | Myrna P. Reglos |
| Councilors | Edgardo Guillermo |
| Councilors | Alexander F. Agliam |

=== Congress representation ===
Burgos, belonging to the fifth legislative district of the province of Isabela, currently represented by Hon. Faustino Michael Carlos T. Dy III.

=== List of former chief executives ===
The following are the list of mayors who served the Municipality of Burgos:

- Kervin Francis G. Uy - July 2016 to June 2022
- Ruben A. Tegui - July 2007 to June 2016
- Felixnaldo B. Alabon, Sr. - July 2004 - June 2007
- Evelyn P. Alabon - July 2001 to June 2004
- Felixnaldo B. Alabon, Sr. - July 1992 - June 2001
- Liborio G. Garcia - July 1988 - June 1992
- Procopio C. Mangabo, Sr. - January 11 to February 11, 1988 (Appointed)
- Claro F. Aglibut - August 1986 - January 1988
- Liborio G. Garcia - 1971 to July 1986
- Perfecto Dela Cruz - 1968 to 1971.

== Education ==
The Schools Division of Isabela governs the town's public education system. The division office is a field office of the DepEd in Cagayan Valley region. The office governs the public and private elementary and public and private high schools throughout the municipality.

=== Primary and elementary schools ===
- Burgos Central School
- Bacnor Elementary School
- Catabban Elementary School
- Cullalabo Elementary School
- Dalig Elementary School
- Malasin Elementary School
- Masigun Elementary School
- Raniag Primary School
- San Antonino Elementary School
- San Miguel Elementary School
- San Roque Elementary School
- San Bonifacio Elementary School

=== Secondary ===
- Bacnor National High School
- Burgos National High School
- Saint Peter's Academy
- San Antonino National High School
