= Benito Soliven =

Municipality in Isabela, Philippines

- Municipality
- Municipality of Benito Soliven
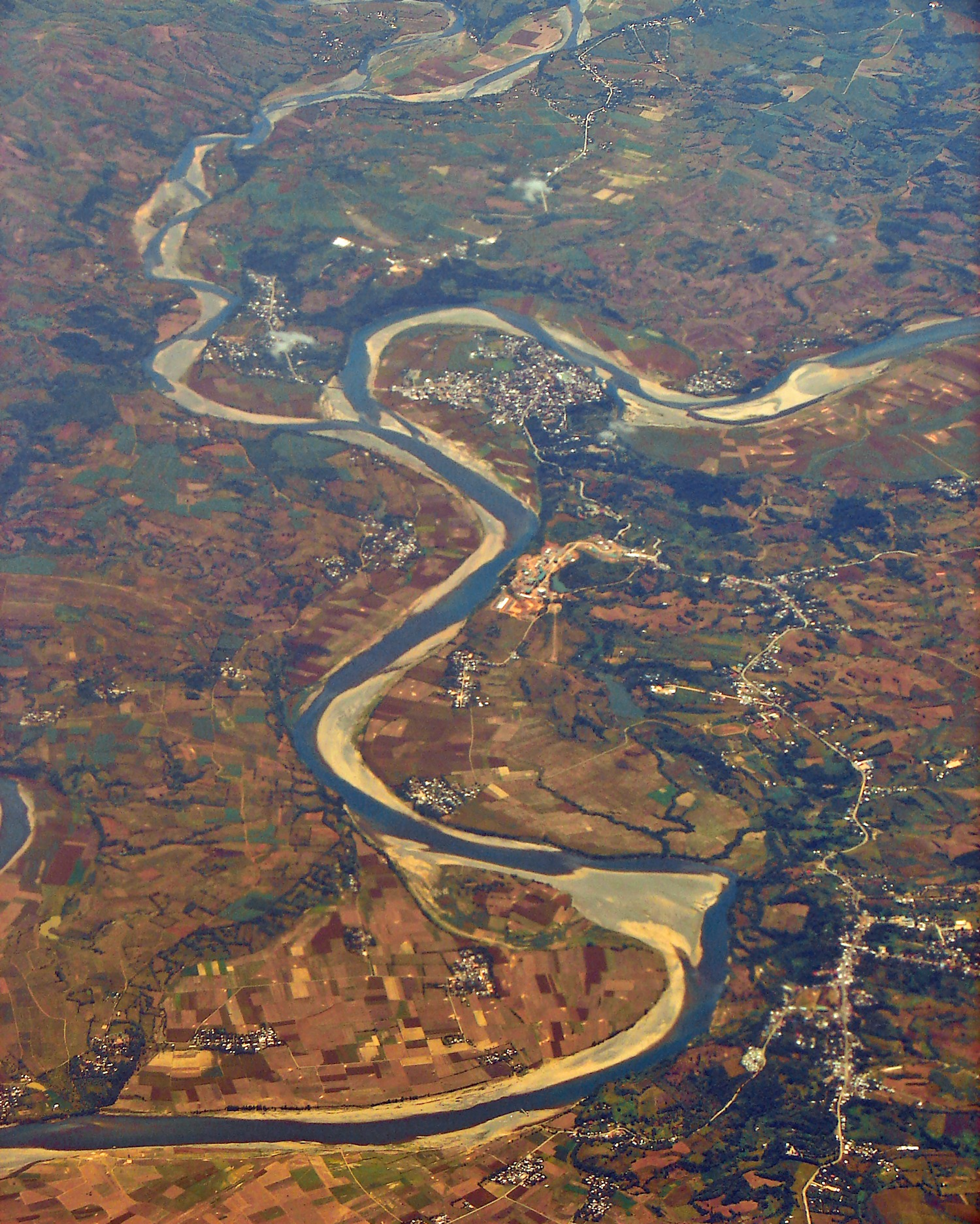
- Aerial view from San Mariano

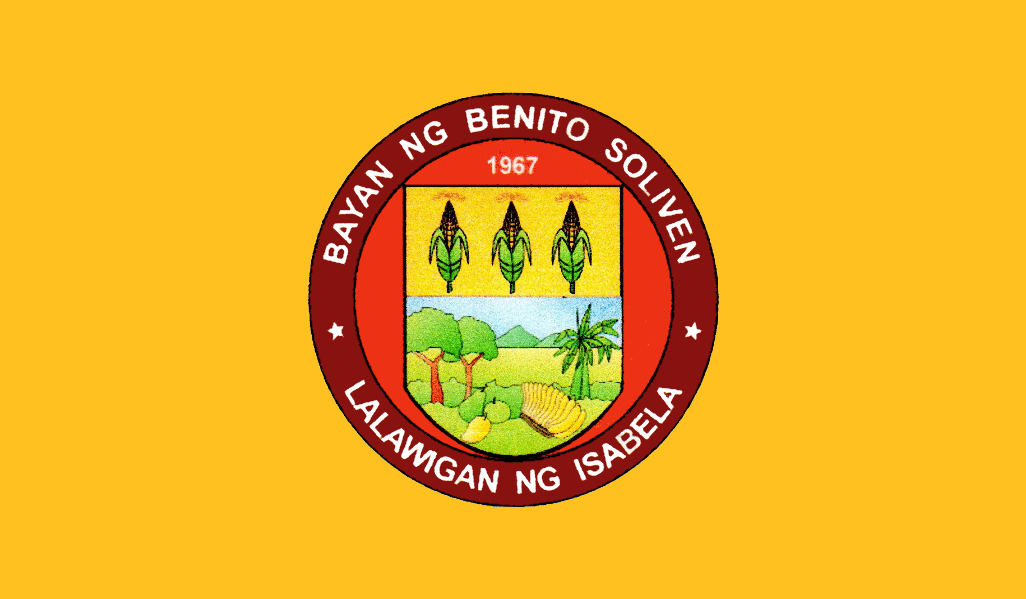
- Flag Seal

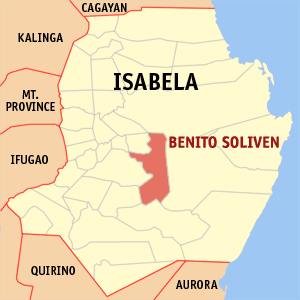
- Map of Isabela with Benito Soliven highlighted
- Interactive map of Benito Soliven
- Location within the Philippines
- Coordinates: 16°59′N 121°57′E
- Country: Philippines
- Region: Cagayan Valley
- Province: Isabela
- District: 2nd district
- Founded: May 18, 1967
- Barangays: 29 (see Barangays)

Government
  - Type: Sangguniang Bayan
  - Mayor: Roberto T. Lungan
  - Vice Mayor: John Paul S. Azur
  - Representative: Ed Christopher S. Go
  - Electorate: 19,914 voters (2025)

Area
  - Total: 184.40 km^{2} (71.20 sq mi)
- Elevation: 79 m (259 ft)
- Highest elevation: 144 m (472 ft)
- Lowest elevation: 40 m (130 ft)

Population (2024 census)
  - Total: 30,682
  - Density: 166.39/km^{2} (430.94/sq mi)
  - Households: 7,373

Economy
  - Income class: 2nd municipal income class
  - Poverty incidence: 12.59% (2023)
  - Revenue: ₱ 185.7 million (2024)
  - Assets: ₱ 685 million (2024)
  - Expenditure: ₱ 184.8 million (2024)
  - Liabilities: ₱ 125.5 million (2024)

Service provider
  - Electricity: Isabela 2 Electric Cooperative (ISELCO 2)
- Time zone: UTC+8 (PST)
- ZIP code: 3331
- PSGC: 0203104000
- IDD : area code: +63 (0)78
- Native languages: Ilocano; Tagalog
- Website: www.benitosoliven-isabela.gov.ph

Benito Soliven, officially the Municipality of Benito Soliven, is a municipality in the province of Isabela, Philippines. According to the 2024 census, it has a population of 30,682 people.

== Etymology ==
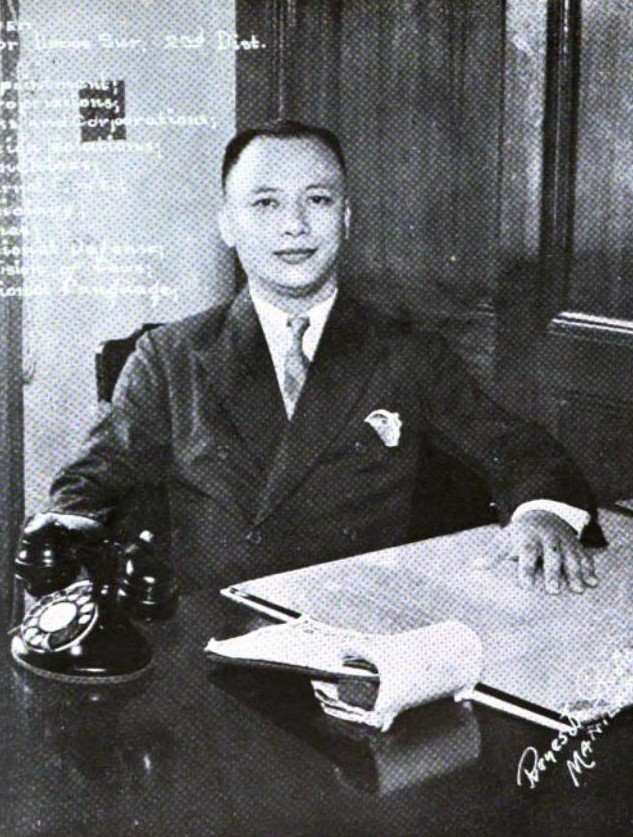
Benito T. Soliven

The town is named after Benito Tagorda Soliven, Congressman of Ilocos Sur's 1st district from 1935 to 1941.

== History ==
Benito Soliven was once known as Melappia of the Municipality of San Mariano. The municipality came to existence with the passage of Republic Act No. 4873 on May 18, 1967. The first elected municipal officials were proclaimed following the November 1967 elections, and the new town's administration began on January 1, 1968. It is now a fourth-class municipality with 29 barangays.

== Geography ==
Benito Soliven is 30.31 kilometres (18.83 mi) from the provincial capital Ilagan, and 400 kilometres (250 mi) from the capital Manila.

=== Barangays ===
Benito Soliven is politically subdivided into 29 barangays. Each barangay consists of puroks while some have sitios.

- Andabuen
- Ara
- Binogtungan
- Capuseran (Capurocan)
- Dagupan
- Danipa
- District II (Poblacion)
- Gomez
- Guilingan
- La Salette
- Makindol
- Maluno Norte
- Maluno Sur
- Nacalma
- New Magsaysay
- Punit
- San Carlos
- San Francisco
- Santa Cruz
- Sevillana
- Sinipit
- Lucban
- Villaluz
- Yeban Norte
- Yeban Sur
- Santiago
- Placer
- Balliao

=== Climate ===
Climate data for Benito Soliven, Isabela
Month	Jan	Feb	Mar	Apr	May	Jun	Jul	Aug	Sep	Oct	Nov	Dec	Year
Mean daily maximum °C (°F)	29 (84)	30 (86)	32 (90)	35 (95)	35 (95)	35 (95)	34 (93)	33 (91)	32 (90)	31 (88)	30 (86)	28 (82)	32 (90)
Mean daily minimum °C (°F)	19 (66)	20 (68)	21 (70)	23 (73)	23 (73)	24 (75)	23 (73)	23 (73)	23 (73)	22 (72)	21 (70)	20 (68)	22 (71)
Average precipitation mm (inches)	31.2 (1.23)	23 (0.9)	27.7 (1.09)	28.1 (1.11)	113.5 (4.47)	141.4 (5.57)	176.4 (6.94)	236.6 (9.31)	224.9 (8.85)	247.7 (9.75)	222.9 (8.78)	178 (7.0)	1,651.4 (65)
Average rainy days	10	6	5	5	13	12	15	15	15	17	16	15	144
Source: World Weather Online

== Demographics ==
Population census of Benito Soliven
Year	Pop.	±% p.a.
1970	14,850	—
1975	13,475	−1.93%
1980	16,710	+4.40%
1990	20,236	+1.93%
1995	20,685	+0.41%
2000	22,192	+1.52%
2007	25,151	+1.74%
2010	27,337	+3.08%
2015	29,624	+1.54%
2020	29,752	+0.09%
2024	30,682	+0.74%
Source: Philippine Statistics Authority

In the 2024 census, the population of Benito Soliven was 30,682 people, with a density of 170 inhabitants per square kilometre or 440 inhabitants per square mile.

== Economy ==
Poverty incidence of Benito Soliven (%)

Source: Philippine Statistics Authority

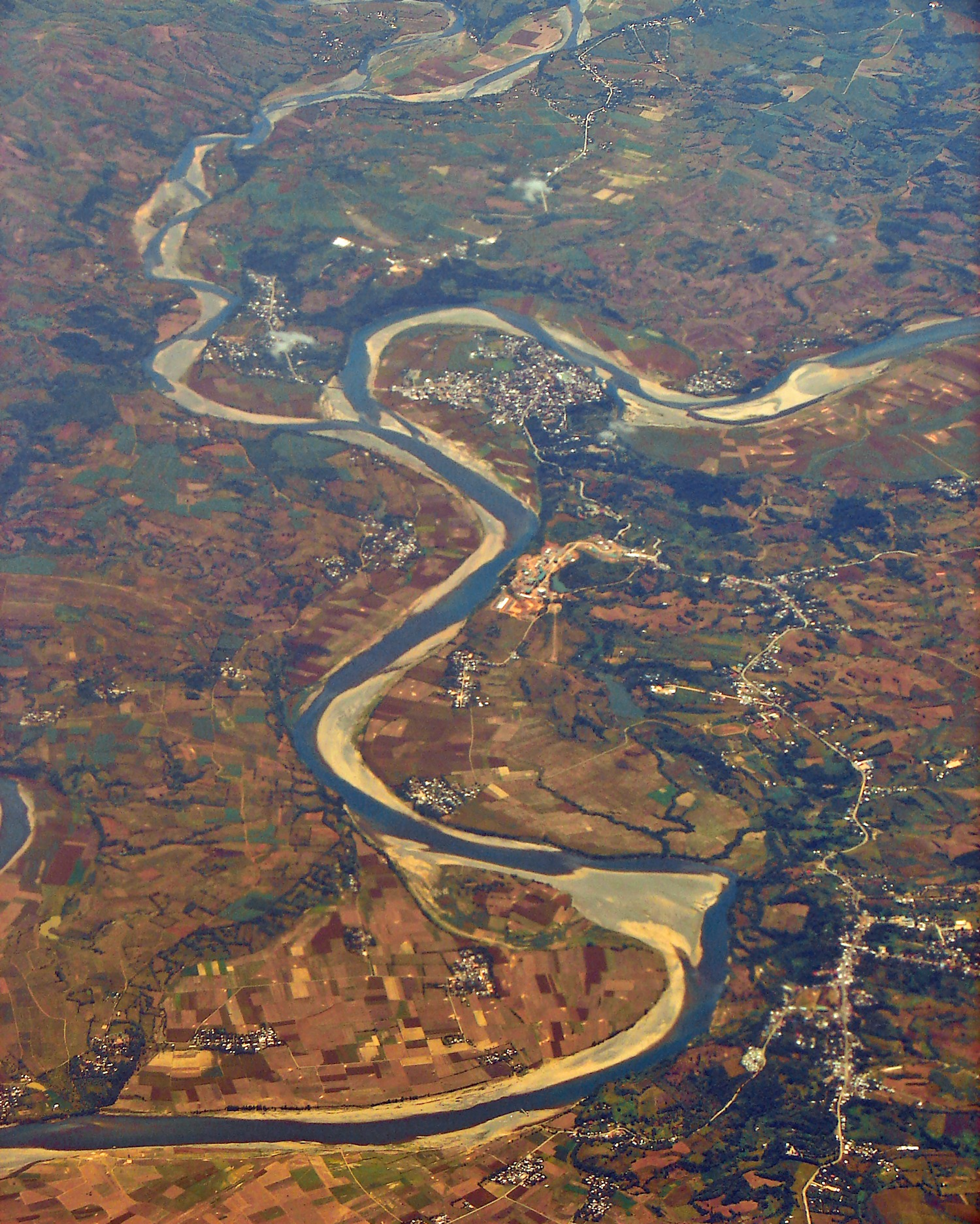
Aerial view of Benito Soliven, with San Mariano in the background

== Government ==
=== Local government ===
As a municipality in the Province of Isabela, government officials at the provincial and municipal levels are voted by the town. The provincial government has political jurisdiction over most local transactions of the municipal government.

The municipality of Benito Soliven is governed by a mayor, designated as its local chief executive, and by a municipal council as its legislative body in accordance with the Local Government Code. The mayor, vice mayor, and the municipal councilors are elected directly by the people through an election held every three years.

Barangays are also headed by elected officials: Barangay Captain, Barangay Council, whose members are called Barangay Councilors. The barangays have SK federation which represents the barangay, headed by SK chairperson and whose members are called SK councilors. All officials are also elected every three years.

=== Elected officials ===
Members of the Municipal Council (2022-2025)
Position	Name
Congressman	Ed Christopher S. Go
Mayor	Roberto T. Lungan
Vice-Mayor	John Paul S. Azur
Councilors	Rose Jane S. Azur
Councilors	Roxan V. Lungan
Councilors	Ernie John B. Abu
Councilors	Rommel L. Rinion
Councilors	Amado G. Viernes
Councilors	Marshal Ancheta
Councilors	Jade Carreon
Councilors	Ferdinand Dela Cruz
SKF President	Isidro Carmelo L. Siquian

=== Congress representation ===
Benito Soliven, belonging to the second legislative district of the province of Isabela, is currently represented by Ed Christopher S. Go.

== Education ==
The Schools Division of Isabela governs the town's public education system. The division office is a field office of the DepEd in Cagayan Valley region. The Benito Soliven Schools District Office governs all educational institutions within the municipality. It oversees the management and operations of all private and public, from primary to secondary schools.

=== Primary and elementary schools ===
- Andabuen Elementary School (Purok 3 Main)
- Andabuen Elementary School (Purok 2 Annex)
- Ara Elementary School
- Benito Soliven Central School
- Binogtungan Elementary School
- Calaocan Elementary School
- Capuseran Elementary School
- Dagupan Elementary School
- Danipa Elementary School
- Gomez Elementary School
- Guilingan Elementary School
- Isabela King of Glory Care School
- La Salette ES
- Makindol Elementary School
- Nacalma Elementary School
- Placer-Dagupan Elementary School
- Punit Elementary School
- San Carlos Primary School
- San Francisco Elementary School
- Santiago Elementary School
- Sevillana Elementary School
- Sinipit Elementary School
- Sta. Cruz Elementary School
- Villa Lucban Primary School
- Yeban Sur Elementary School

=== Secondary schools ===
- Andabuen National High School
- Balliao Integrated School
- Benito Soliven National High School
- Maluno Integrated School (Purok 4 Annex A)
- Maluno Integrated School (Purok 2 Annex B)
- New Magsaysay Integrated School
- St. Clare College
- Yeban Integrated School
