= Luna, Isabela =

Municipality in Isabela, Philippines

Luna
- Municipality
- Municipality of Luna
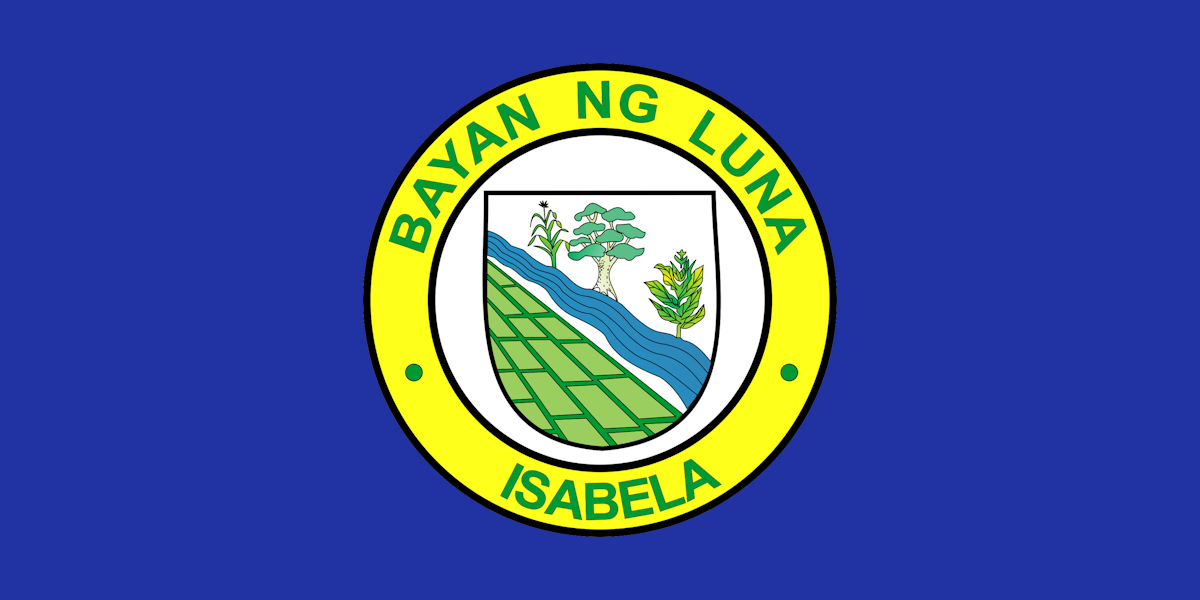
- Flag Seal

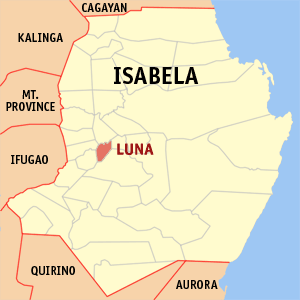
- Map of Isabela with Luna highlighted
- Interactive map of Luna
- Location within the Philippines
- Coordinates: 16°58′N 121°44′E
- Country: Philippines
- Region: Cagayan Valley
- Province: Isabela
- District: 5th district
- Founded: June 8, 1951
- Named for: Antonio Luna
- Barangays: 19 (see Barangays)

Government
  - Type: Sangguniang Bayan
  - Mayor: Adrian Leandro P. Tio
  - Vice Mayor: Lelamen R. Soingco
  - Representative: Faustino Michael Carlos T. Dy III
  - Electorate: 14,869 voters (2025)

Area
  - Total: 45.70 km^{2} (17.64 sq mi)
- Elevation: 54 m (177 ft)
- Highest elevation: 77 m (253 ft)
- Lowest elevation: 39 m (128 ft)

Population (2024 census)
  - Total: 21,015
  - Density: 459.8/km^{2} (1,191/sq mi)
  - Households: 5,253

Economy
  - Income class: 1st municipal income class
  - Poverty incidence: 9.02% (2023)
  - Revenue: ₱ 258.5 million (2024)
  - Assets: ₱ 933.4 million (2024)
  - Expenditure: ₱ 154.2 million (2024)
  - Liabilities: ₱ 255.7 million (2024)

Service provider
  - Electricity: Isabela 1 Electric Cooperative (ISELCO 1)
- Time zone: UTC+8 (PST)
- ZIP code: 3304
- PSGC: 0203116000
- IDD : area code: +63 (0)78
- Native languages: Ilocano; Tagalog
- Website: www.luna-isabela.gov.ph

Luna, officially the Municipality of Luna (Ilocano: Ili ti Luna; Tagalog: Bayan ng Luna), is a municipality in the province of Isabela, Philippines. According to the 2024 census, it has a population of 21,015 people.

== History ==
Luna was formerly known as Antatet. The town's name was changed to Luna on June 8, 1951 by virtue of Republic Act No. 633.

== Geography ==
Luna is situated 37.68 kilometres (23.41 mi) from the provincial capital Ilagan, and 403.53 kilometres (250.74 mi) from the country's capital city of Manila.

=== Barangays ===
Luna is politically subdivided into 19 barangays. Each barangay consists of puroks while some have sitios.

- Bustamante
- Centro 1 (Poblacion)
- Centro 2 (Poblacion)
- Centro 3 (Bataraza)
- Concepcion
- Dadap
- Harana
- Lalog 1
- Lalog 2
- Luyao
- Macañao
- Macugay
- Mambabanga
- Pulay
- Puroc
- San Isidro (River Side)
- San Miguel
- Santo Domingo (Dammang)
- Union Kalinga

=== Climate ===
Climate data for Luna, Isabela
Month	Jan	Feb	Mar	Apr	May	Jun	Jul	Aug	Sep	Oct	Nov	Dec	Year
Mean daily maximum °C (°F)	29 (84)	30 (86)	32 (90)	35 (95)	35 (95)	35 (95)	34 (93)	33 (91)	32 (90)	31 (88)	30 (86)	28 (82)	32 (90)
Mean daily minimum °C (°F)	19 (66)	20 (68)	21 (70)	23 (73)	23 (73)	24 (75)	23 (73)	23 (73)	23 (73)	22 (72)	21 (70)	20 (68)	22 (71)
Average precipitation mm (inches)	31.2 (1.23)	23 (0.9)	27.7 (1.09)	28.1 (1.11)	113.5 (4.47)	141.4 (5.57)	176.4 (6.94)	236.6 (9.31)	224.9 (8.85)	247.7 (9.75)	222.9 (8.78)	178 (7.0)	1,651.4 (65)
Average rainy days	10	6	5	5	13	12	15	15	15	17	16	15	144
Source: World Weather Online

== Demographics ==
Population census of Luna
Year	Pop.	±% p.a.
1939	2,009	—
1948	3,075	+4.84%
1960	5,209	+4.49%
1970	7,008	+3.01%
1975	8,404	+3.71%
1980	9,745	+3.00%
1990	12,335	+2.39%
1995	13,255	+1.36%
2000	14,581	+2.06%
2007	15,884	+1.19%
2010	18,091	+4.85%
2015	19,326	+1.27%
2020	20,697	+1.45%
2024	21,015	+0.37%
Source: Philippine Statistics Authority

In the 2024 census, the population of Luna, was 21,015 people, with a density of 460 inhabitants per square kilometre or 1,200 inhabitants per square mile.

== Economy ==
Poverty incidence of Luna (%)

Source: Philippine Statistics Authority

== Government ==
=== Local government ===
As a municipality in the Province of Isabela, government officials at the provincial and municipal levels are voted by the town. The provincial government has political jurisdiction over most local transactions of the municipal government.

The Municipality of Luna is governed by a mayor, designated as its local chief executive, and by a municipal council as its legislative body in accordance with the Local Government Code. The mayor, vice mayor, and the municipal councilors are elected directly by the people in elections held every three years.

Barangays are also headed by elected officials: Barangay Captain, Barangay Council, whose members are called Barangay Councilors. The barangays have SK federation which represents the barangay, headed by SK chairperson and whose members are called SK councilors. All officials are also elected every three years.

=== Elected officials ===
Members of the Luna Municipal Council (2022-2025)
Position	Name
District Representative	Faustino Michael Carlos T. Dy III
Municipal Mayor	Adrian Leandro P. Tio
Municipal Vice-Mayor	Lelamen R. Soingco
Municipal Councilors	Leslie G. Tan
Municipal Councilors	Vicente T. Perez III
Municipal Councilors	Allan John A. Perez
Municipal Councilors	Panchito M. Pua
Municipal Councilors	Pilar M. Cabacungan
Municipal Councilors	Jerry J. Rivera
Municipal Councilors	Bayani L. Agustin
Municipal Councilors	Eisenhower U. Baysac

=== Congress representation ===
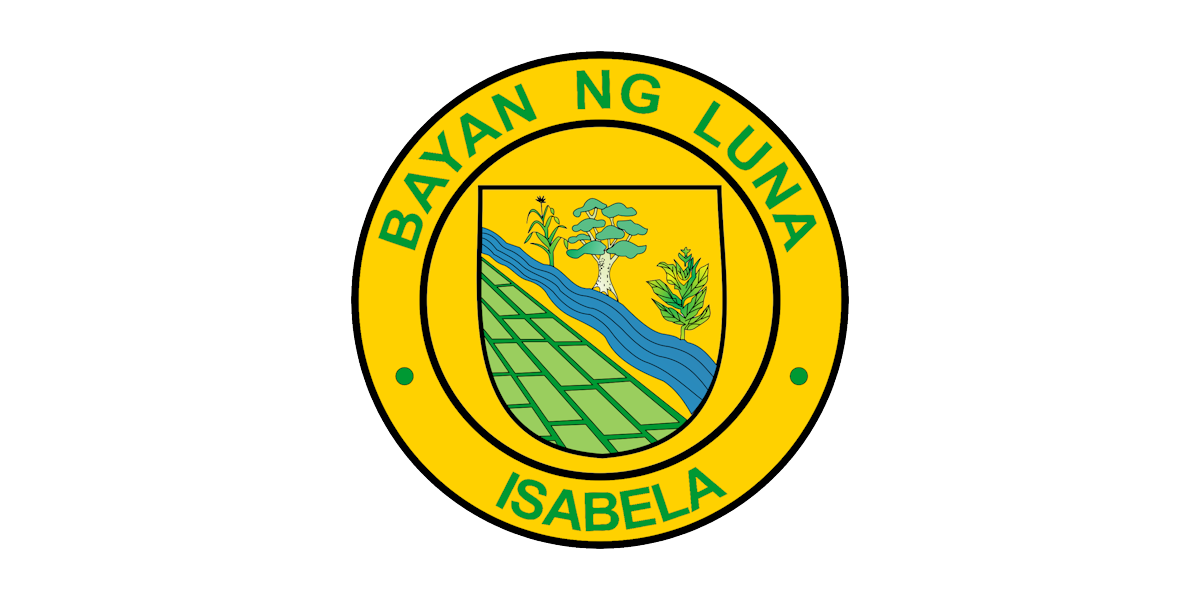
Former flag of Luna

Luna, belonging to the fifth legislative district of the province of Isabela, currently represented by Hon. Faustino Michael Carlos T. Dy III.

== Education ==
The Schools Division of Isabela governs the town's public education system. The division office is a field office of the DepEd in Cagayan Valley region. Luna Schools District office governs the public elementary and high schools throughout the municipality.

=== Primary and elementary schools ===
- Bustamante Elementary School
- Dadap Elementary School
- Harana Elementary School
- Lalog Elementary School
- Luna Central School
- Mambabanga Elementary School
- Macugay Elementary School
- Pulay-Union Kalinga Elementary School
- Puroc-Concepcion Elementary School

=== Secondary schools ===
- Luna General Comprehensive High School
- Luna National High School
- Sto. Domingo-San Isidro Integrated School

== See also ==
- List of renamed cities and municipalities in the Philippines
