= Ramon, Isabela =

Municipality in Isabela, Philippines

Ramon
- Municipality
- Municipality of Ramon
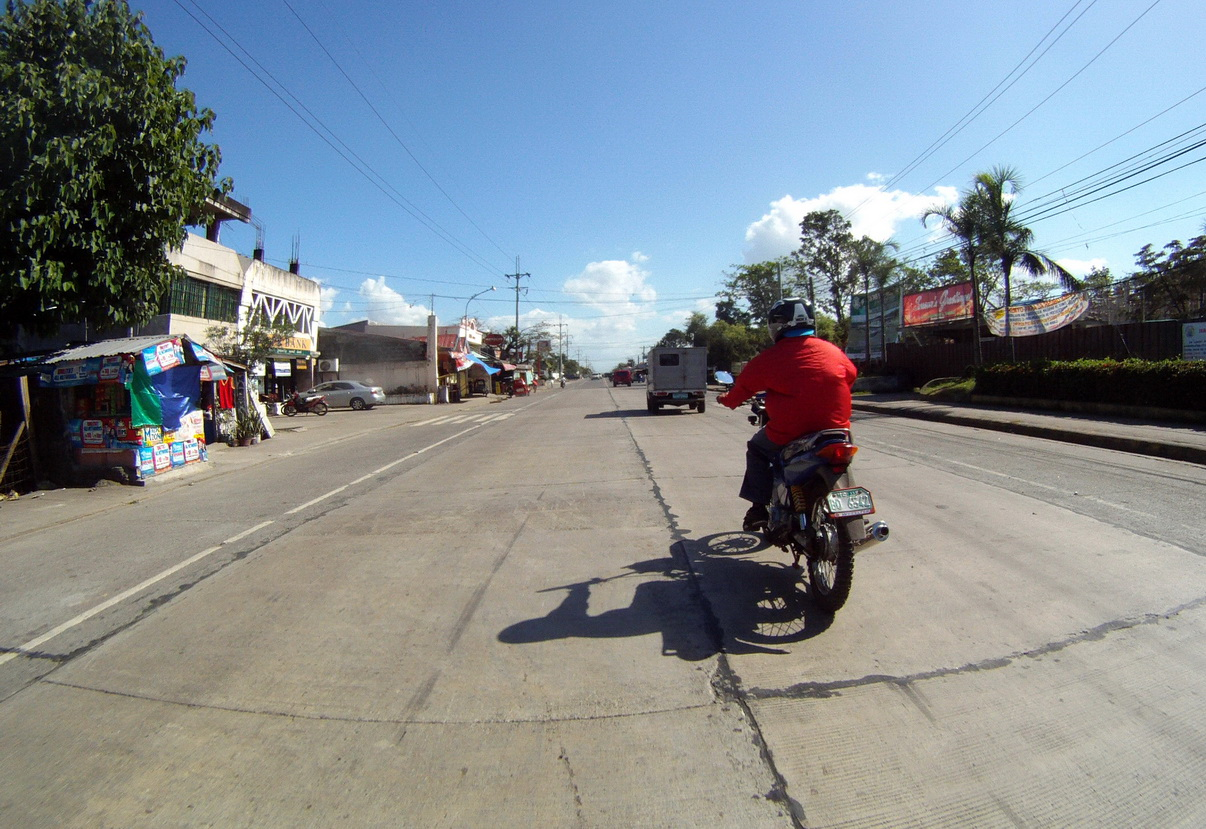
- Street of Ramon

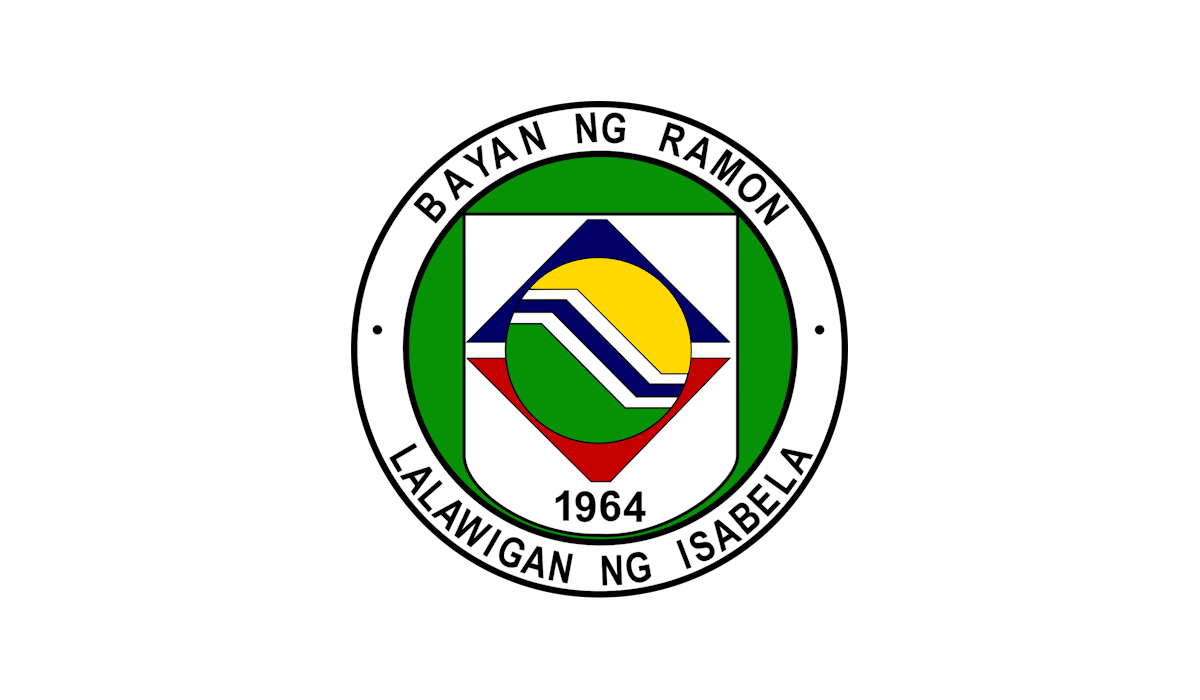
- Flag Seal
- Nicknames: Tilapia Capital of Isabela; Hub of Magat Dam
- Motto: Aramid ti pakakitaan
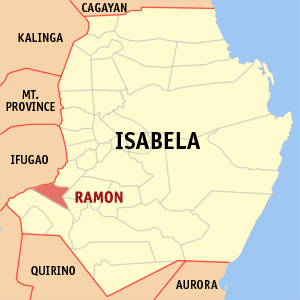
- Map of Isabela with Ramon highlighted
- Interactive map of Ramon
- Location within the Philippines
- Coordinates: 16°47′N 121°32′E
- Country: Philippines
- Region: Cagayan Valley
- Province: Isabela
- District: 3rd district
- Founded: June 18, 1961
- Named for: Ramon Magsaysay
- Barangays: 19 (see Barangays)

Government
  - Type: Sangguniang Bayan
  - Mayor: Giovanni Vizcarra
  - Vice Mayor: Dennis Jon A. Dela Cruz
  - Representative: Ian Paul L. Dy
  - Electorate: 32,769 voters (2025)

Area
  - Total: 135.17 km^{2} (52.19 sq mi)
- Elevation: 101 m (331 ft)
- Highest elevation: 154 m (505 ft)
- Lowest elevation: 79 m (259 ft)

Population (2024 census)
  - Total: 57,412
  - Density: 424.74/km^{2} (1,100.1/sq mi)
  - Households: 14,823

Economy
  - Income class: 1st municipal income class
  - Poverty incidence: 12.94% (2023)
  - Revenue: ₱ 302.2 million (2024)
  - Assets: ₱ 1,360 million (2024)
  - Expenditure: ₱ 324.5 million (2024)
  - Liabilities: ₱ 473.5 million (2024)

Service provider
  - Electricity: Isabela 1 Electric Cooperative (ISELCO 1)
- Time zone: UTC+8 (PST)
- ZIP code: 3319
- PSGC: 0203124000
- IDD : area code: +63 (0)78
- Native languages: Ilocano; Gaddang; Tagalog
- Website: www.ramon-isabela.gov.ph

Ramon, officially the Municipality of Ramon (Ilocano: Ili ti Ramon; Tagalog: Bayan ng Ramon), is a municipality in the province of Isabela, Philippines. According to the 2024 census, it has a population of 57,412 people.

== Etymology ==
The municipality was named in honor of the late President Ramon Magsaysay.

== History ==
The site of Ramon was previously inhabited by Gaddangs. In 1846, the Spanish put up a fortress named Begonia in the area to defend the neighboring Christian settlements from attacks by Ifugaos and as a stepping stone for the conquest of Ifugao. In 1882, settlement that grew around the fort was officially founded and renamed Oscariz after Don Mariano Oscariz, a former Military Governor of Nueva Vizcaya, to which the town belonged to until the creation of the province of Isabela in 1856. Oscariz was officially recognized as a town by virtue of a Royal Decree dated September 12, 1896.

From January to February 1900, President Emilio Aguinaldo stayed in Oscariz while fleeing from American forces during the Philippine-American War. After the establishment of American rule, Oscariz was abolished as a town and became a barrio of Santiago.

In the middle of the 1920s when the San Jose–Santa Fe national road opened, Ilocano migrants from the Central Plain of Luzon, particularly Tarlac, Pangasinan, and Nueva Ecija, arrived in bull carts to settle on this vast area covered with weeds called “samon” as homesteaders. As required by statutes, these people stayed right on their 24 hectares (59 acres) farms to clear the lot in order call it their own. The place was a part of Buenavista, the oldest barrio of Santiago, Isabela. For more than ten years amidst hardships and sufferings due to malaria and unfavorable weather conditions, the pioneers labored to convert their homestead into a productive farm with palay as their main crop.

In 1937, the Santiago–Tuguegarao Road via the Mallig Plains was opened and more immigrants came to farm in the place. This area which is 10 kilometres (6.2 mi) away from the town proper of Santiago later emerged to become barrio Bugallon, eventually becoming the biggest barrio of Santiago.

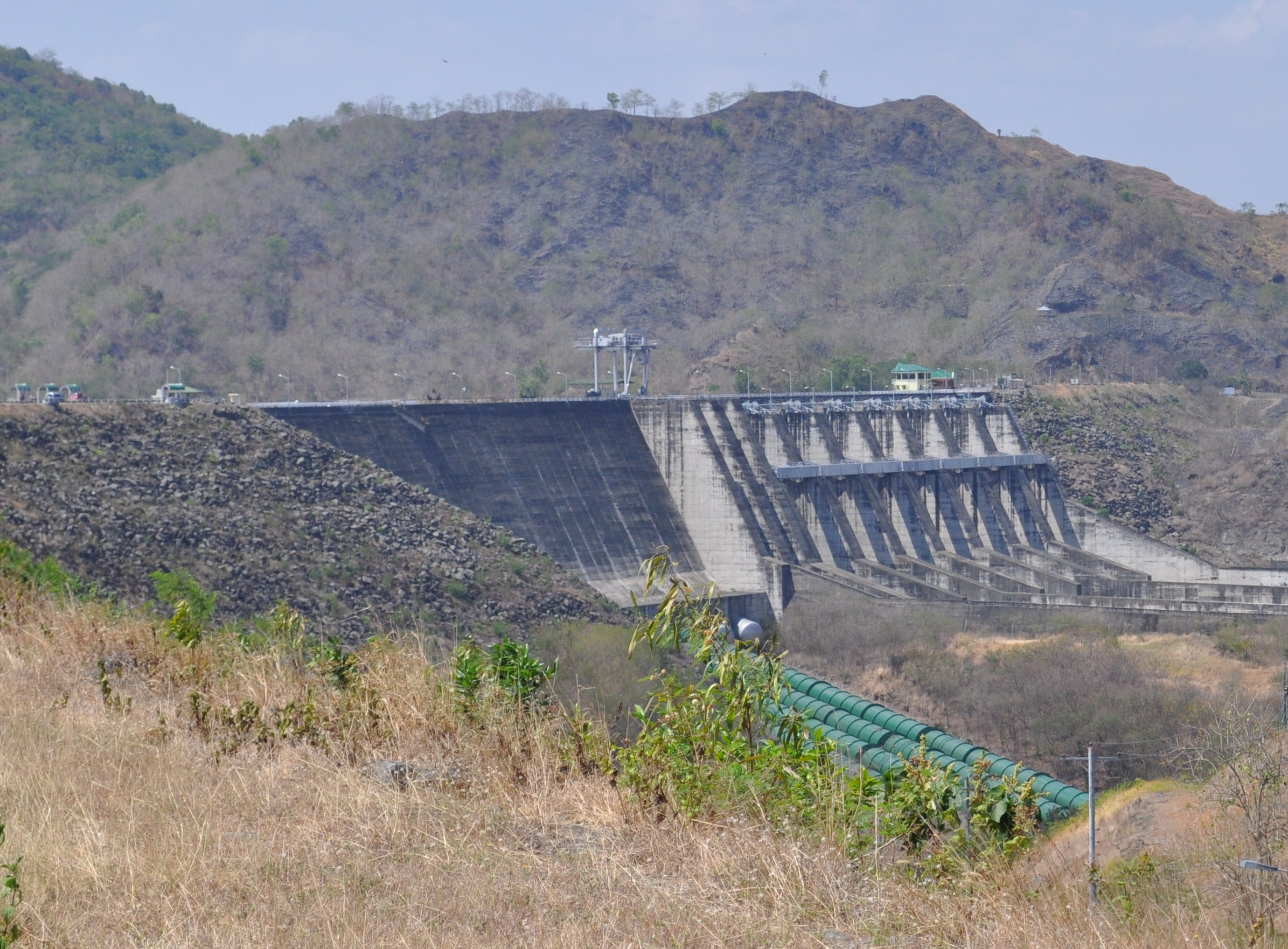
Magat Dam

The completion of the Maris Dam at Ambatali in 1957 attracted more migrants to farm at the irrigated areas of Bugallon. Along with the Ilocano arrivals were a few Tagalogs, Pangasinenses, and many others.

The municipality of Ramon was created on June 18, 1961, by virtue of Republic Act No. 3320 sponsored by then Congressman Delfin Albano of the then lone district of Isabela. On November 12, 1963, the first set of local officials were elected with Angelino F. Vizcarra as Municipal Mayor.

The original seat of government was first conceived to be established 500 meters north of Barangay Burgos. However, the local officials decided to temporarily locate the site at Bugallon which eventually became the permanent site by virtue of Republic Act No. 11354, upon which a two-storey Municipal Hall was built on December 8, 1968.

The municipality was originally classified as a seventh class municipality at the time of its inauguration on January 1, 1964. Ramon had 12 original barangays carved out from the municipalities of San Mateo and Santiago. In 1966, another barangay was annexed from the municipality of Echague. Later, by virtue of the revised Barangay Charter or Republic Act. No. 3590, six additional barangays were created.

The rural Electrification Program of ISELCO I was completed in the latter part of the 1970s.

With the completion of the Magat Dam in 1983, more areas were converted into irrigated rice lands which attracted further migration to the municipality, including Igorots and Ifugaos from the Cordilleras.

== Geography ==
Ramon has a semi-radial but more defined linear development along the national road from Santiago City in the south to San Mateo towards the north. With the completion of the Magat River Multi-purpose high dam near the Isabela-Ifugao provincial boundary, the trend of expansion has deviated westward.

Ramon is situated 69.66 kilometres (43.28 mi) from the provincial capital Ilagan, and 367.80 kilometres (228.54 mi) from the country's capital city of Manila.

=== Barangays ===
Ramon is politically subdivided into 19 barangays. Each barangay consists of puroks while some have sitios.

- Ambatali
- Bantug
- Bugallon Norte
- Bugallon Proper (Centro)
- Burgos
- General Aguinaldo
- Nagbacalan
- Oscariz
- Pabil
- Pagrang-ayan
- Planas
- Purok ni Bulan
- Raniag
- San Miguel
- San Antonio
- San Sebastian
- Villa Beltran
- Villa Carmen
- Villa Marcos

=== Climate ===
Climate data for Ramon, Isabela
Month	Jan	Feb	Mar	Apr	May	Jun	Jul	Aug	Sep	Oct	Nov	Dec	Year
Mean daily maximum °C (°F)	31 (88)	31 (88)	32 (90)	34 (93)	35 (95)	34 (93)	32 (90)	32 (90)	32 (90)	32 (90)	32 (90)	31 (88)	32 (90)
Mean daily minimum °C (°F)	22 (72)	22 (72)	22 (72)	24 (75)	24 (75)	24 (75)	24 (75)	24 (75)	24 (75)	23 (73)	23 (73)	22 (72)	23 (74)
Average precipitation mm (inches)	13.6 (0.54)	10.4 (0.41)	18.2 (0.72)	15.7 (0.62)	178.4 (7.02)	227.9 (8.97)	368 (14.5)	306.6 (12.07)	310.6 (12.23)	215.7 (8.49)	70.3 (2.77)	31.1 (1.22)	1,766.5 (69.56)
Average rainy days	3	2	2	4	14	16	23	21	24	15	10	6	140
Source: World Weather Online

== Demographics ==
Population census of Ramon
Year	Pop.	±% p.a.
1970	15,211	—
1975	17,841	+3.25%
1980	30,815	+11.55%
1990	33,444	+0.82%
1995	35,885	+1.33%
2000	41,441	+3.13%
2007	45,258	+1.22%
2010	49,812	+3.55%
2015	52,707	+1.08%
2020	56,523	+1.48%
2024	57,412	+0.38%
Source: Philippine Statistics Authority

In the 2024 census, the population of Ramon was 57,412 people, with a density of 420 inhabitants per square kilometre or 1,100 inhabitants per square mile.

== Economy ==
Multi-Purpose Drying Pavement & Onion Cold Storage Facility

Poverty incidence of Ramon (%)

Source: Philippine Statistics Authority

Endowed with prime agricultural lands, the majority of its inhabitants derive their income from agriculture. Ramon ranks among the top rice-producing towns of Isabela alongside the towns of Alicia and San Mateo.

The northern border of Ramon is the Magat River that provides power to national grid though the Magat Dam. The dam is a major employer in Barangay General Aguinaldo and has the works buildings and staff compounds situated there also. An undeveloped airport is in the area next to the river.

Ramon functions as a satellite town of Santiago City, a major growth center in southern Isabela. The Magat River Multi-purpose project, likewise, provides the municipality economic and social gains brought about by the influx of technological advancements like irrigation and electric power.

== Government ==
=== Local government ===
As a municipality in the Province of Isabela, government officials at the provincial and municipal levels are voted by the town. The provincial government has political jurisdiction over most local transactions of the municipal government.

The Municipality of Ramon is governed by a mayor, designated as its Local Chief Executive, and by a municipal council as its legislative body in accordance with the Local Government Code. The mayor, vice mayor, and the municipal councilors are elected directly in elections held every three years.

Barangays are also headed by elected officials: Barangay Captain, Barangay Council, whose members are called Barangay Councilors. The barangays have SK federation which represents the barangay, headed by SK chairperson and whose members are called SK councilors. All officials are also elected every three years.

=== Elected officials ===
Members of the Ramon Municipal Council (2022-2025)
Position	Name
District Representative	Ian Paul L. Dy
Municipal Mayor	Jesus D. Laddaran
Municipal Vice-Mayor	Dennis Jon A. Dela Cruz
Municipal Councilors	Giovanni M. Vizcarra
Municipal Councilors	Melvin Cristobal
Municipal Councilors	Myrna Navarro
Municipal Councilors	Rita T. Banhan
Municipal Councilors	Arlyn Keith Alethea L. Esteban
Municipal Councilors	Rodrigo D. Terte
Municipal Councilors	Candido C. Natividad, Jr.
Municipal Councilors	Felisa C. Dalupang
ABC President	Jesse Leonard V. Laddaran
SK Federation President	Nemerson T. Manuel

=== Congress representation ===
Ramon, belonging to the third legislative district of the province of Isabela, currently represented by Hon. Ian Paul L. Dy.

== Education ==
The Schools Division of Isabela governs the town's public education system. The division office is a field office of the DepEd in Cagayan Valley region. The Ramon Schools District Office governs the public and private elementary and high schools throughout the municipality.

=== Primary and elementary schools ===
- Ambatali Elementary School
- Bantug Elementary School
- Bugallon Norte Elementary School
- Burgos Elementary School
- Gen. Aguinaldo Elementary School (Main)
- Gen. Aguinaldo Elementary School - Villa Verde Primary School (Annex)
- Nagbacalan Elementary School
- Oscariz Elementary School
- Pabil Elementary School
- Pagrang-ayan Elementary School
- Planas Elementary School
- Purok ni Bulan Elementary School
- Ramon Central School
- Raniag Elementary School
- San Antonio Elementary School
- Villa Beltran Elementary School
- Villa Carmen Elementary School
- Villa Marcos Elementary School

=== Secondary schools ===
- General Emilio Aguinaldo National High School
- JET Montessori School of Ramon
- La Salette of Ramon
- Oscariz United Methodist Church Christian School
- Ramon National High School
- Ramon United Methodist School
- Raniag High School
- San Miguel Integrated School - Main
- San Miguel Integrated School - Annex
- San Sebastian Integrated School
- Zacariah Learning Center
