= San Mateo, Isabela =

Municipality in Isabela, Philippines

San Mateo
- Municipality
- Municipality of San Mateo
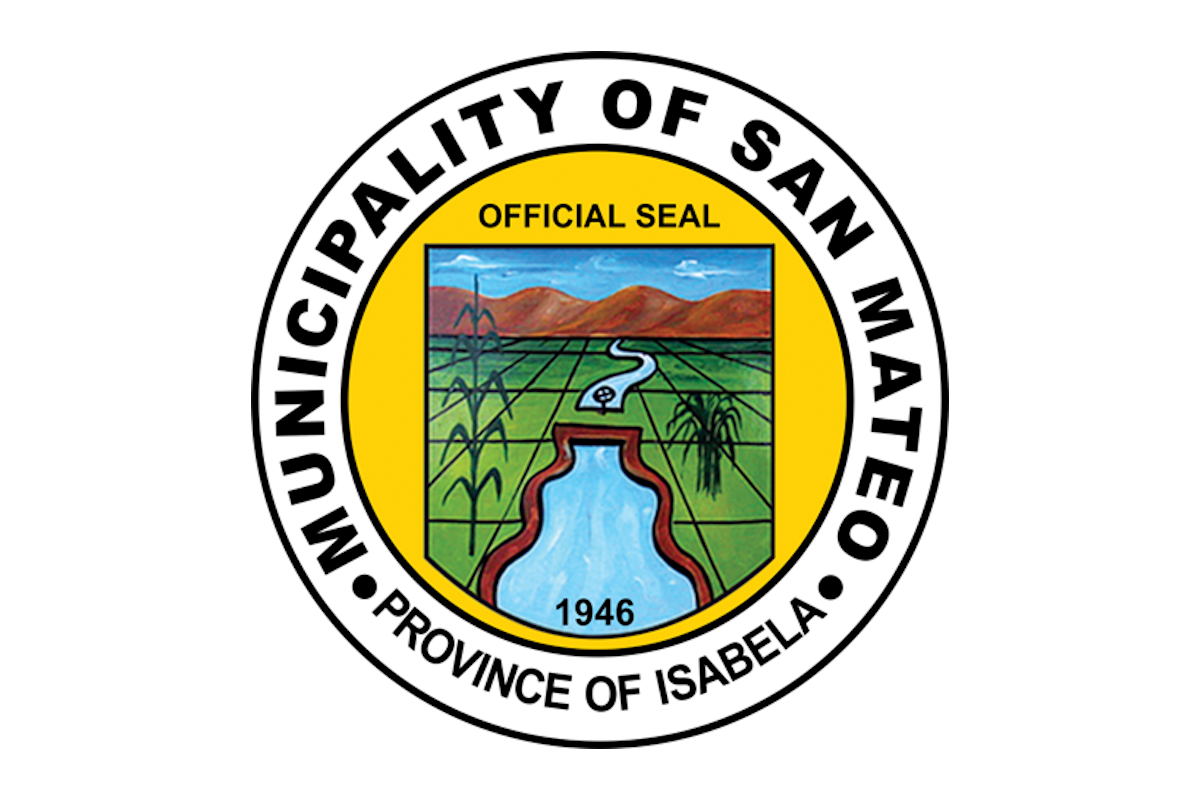
- Flag Seal
- Nicknames: Munggo Capital of the Philippines; Agro Ecological Destination in Cagayan Valley
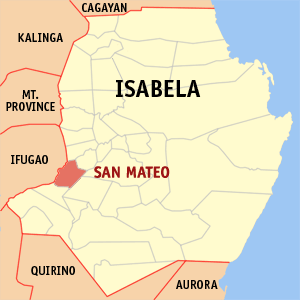
- Map of Isabela with San Mateo highlighted
- Interactive map of San Mateo
- Location within the Philippines
- Coordinates: 16°53′N 121°35′E
- Country: Philippines
- Region: Cagayan Valley
- Province: Isabela
- District: 3rd district
- Founded: March 17, 1946
- Named for: Don Mateo Cadeliña
- Barangays: 33 (see Barangays)

Government
  - Type: Sangguniang Bayan
  - Mayor: Atty. Gregorio A. Pua
  - Vice Mayor: Alan L. Cabacungan
  - Representative: Ian Paul L. Dy

Area
  - Total: 120.60 km^{2} (46.56 sq mi)
- Elevation: 82 m (269 ft)
- Highest elevation: 145 m (476 ft)
- Lowest elevation: 68 m (223 ft)

Population (66,663)
  - Total: 66,663
  - Rank: 7th out of 37 (in Isabela)
  - Density: 552.76/km^{2} (1,431.6/sq mi)
  - Households: 16,743

Economy
  - Income class: 1st municipal income class
  - Poverty incidence: 10.46% (2023)
  - Revenue: ₱ 175.2 million (2024)
  - Assets: ₱ 538.6 million (2024)
  - Expenditure: ₱ 179.4 million (2024)
  - Liabilities: ₱ 192 million (2024)

Service provider
  - Electricity: Isabela 1 Electric Cooperative (ISELCO 1)
- Time zone: UTC+8 (PST)
- ZIP code: 3318
- PSGC: 0203132000
- IDD : area code: +63 (0)78
- Native languages: Ilocano; Tagalog
- Website: www.sanmateo-isabela.gov.ph

San Mateo (pronounced locally as /sænˈmäCHō/ not /sæn mə-tay-oh/, Spanish for St. Matthew), officially the Municipality of San Mateo (Ilocano: Ili ti San Mateo; Tagalog: Bayan ng San Mateo), is a municipality in the province of Isabela, Philippines. According to the 2024 census, it has a population of 67,433 people.

The town is one of the cleanest town in the region. The administrators encourage the people of the municipality to use paper bags instead of plastic bags in line with its claim as an "Agro-Ecological Town".

== Etymology ==
The town was first named as Marasat. It was a former barangay of Cauayan, then Santiago. It was called the Municipality of Yoshisawa under the government of the Japanese Imperial Army during the Second World War. After the liberation, it was finally created and named San Mateo by virtue of Presidential Executive Order No. 97 on March 17, 1946, by then President Sergio Osmeña. It was named for its founder, the late Don Mateo A. Cadeliña.

== History ==
On March 17, 1946, President Sergio Osmeña issued Executive Order No. 97, which established San Mateo as a formal municipality. According to the provisions of Executive Order No. 249 of the Office of the President of the Philippines, and based on the municipality's annual average income for CY 2004–2007 as certified by the Commission on Audit, and as implemented by Department of Finance Order No. 23–08 dated July 29, 2008, the municipality was reclassified from a second class municipality to first class municipality.

On December 1, 2008, President Gloria Macapagal Arroyo designated the Municipality as an Agro-Ecological Destination in Cagayan Valley Region as recommended by the Department of Agriculture due to its vast ecological and agricultural production areas, as well as being the recipient of the Galing Pook Award 2007 for the best local governance programs. On January 27, 2012, Agriculture Secretary Proceso Alcala designated the municipality as the Munggo Capital of the Philippines. This is in acknowledgment of local leaders' valuable efforts to promote munggo production, which is a high-value commercial commodity.'

According to Republic Act No. 7160, also known as the Local Government Code of 1991, the municipality is responsible for coordinating and providing basic, regular, and direct services to its residents in order to promote social and economic development. As proof, the municipality of San Mateo received the Seal of Good Local Governance from 2015 to 2019 and again in 2022, the Department of the Interior and Local Government's highest accreditation for performing local governments.

== Geography ==
San Mateo is situated in the southwestern part of Isabela. It is bounded on the north by Aurora, on the northeast by Cabatuan, on the east by Cauayan, on the east-southeast by Alicia, on the south by Ramon and on the west Alfonso Lista in the Province of Ifugao.

San Mateo is situated 54.67 kilometres (33.97 mi) from the provincial capital Ilagan, and 382.79 kilometres (237.85 mi) from the country's capital city of Manila.

=== Barangays ===
San Mateo is politically subdivided into 33 barangays. Each barangay consists of puroks while some have sitios.

- Bacarreña
- Bagong Sikat
- Daramuangan Norte
- Daramuangan Sur
- Estrella
- Gaddanan
- Malasin
- Mapuroc
- Marasat Grande
- Marasat Pequeño
- Old Centro I
- Old Centro Proper
- Barangay I (Poblacion)
- Barangay II (Poblacion)
- Barangay III (Poblacion)
- Barangay IV (Poblacion)
- Salinungan East
- Salinungan West
- San Andres
- San Antonio
- San Ignacio
- San Manuel
- San Marcos
- San Roque
- Sinamar Norte
- Sinamar Sur
- Victoria
- Villafuerte
- Villa Cruz
- Villa Magat
- Villa Gamiao (Buyon)

=== Climate ===
Climate data for San Mateo, Isabela
Month	Jan	Feb	Mar	Apr	May	Jun	Jul	Aug	Sep	Oct	Nov	Dec	Year
Mean daily maximum °C (°F)	29 (84)	30 (86)	32 (90)	35 (95)	35 (95)	35 (95)	34 (93)	33 (91)	32 (90)	31 (88)	30 (86)	28 (82)	32 (90)
Mean daily minimum °C (°F)	15 (59)	17 (63)	18 (64)	19 (66)	23 (73)	24 (75)	23 (73)	23 (73)	23 (73)	22 (72)	19 (66)	17 (63)	20 (68)
Average precipitation mm (inches)	31.2 (1.23)	23 (0.9)	27.7 (1.09)	28.1 (1.11)	113.5 (4.47)	141.4 (5.57)	176.4 (6.94)	236.6 (9.31)	224.9 (8.85)	247.7 (9.75)	222.9 (8.78)	178 (7.0)	1,651.4 (65)
Average rainy days	10	6	5	5	13	12	15	15	15	17	16	15	144
Source: World Weather Online

The climate of San Mateo falls under third type. This type of climate is characterized by no pronounced maximum rain period with a short dry season lasting from one to three months. Rainfall starts in July and continues through December with either October or November as the peak of the rainy season.

Per data gathered from the ISU PAG-ASA PCARRD AGROMET Station, Echague, Isabela, the average monthly rainfall for 2011 was 238.20mm with the highest recorded at 558.20mm in September and at least in March with 32.6mm. The highest recorded temperature was its peak in May at 34.40C during the summer season and the lowest at 26.10C in January. However the average temperature for the same period was 30.70C.

=== Land Classification and Uses ===
The soil type of San Mateo is 49.89% Santa Rita Clay Loam which is suited for lowland crops like rice, tobacco and mungo. Other soil types are Bago Series (26.04%), San Manuel Series (9.87%), Peñaranda (2.31%), Agustin Series (7.95%) and River Wash Gravel (3.95%).

The existing land uses of the municipality are as follows:

The long and mighty Magat River, the biggest tributary of the Cagayan River lies in the vast plains devoted to agriculture in the area.

The Tao-Tao River and the four (4) creeks found in the municipality named Porvida, Gaddanan, Macañao and Balaobao are likewise tapped to supply water to elevated portions of agricultural lands through the use of water pumps.

=== Topography ===
The terrain of the municipality is basically plain with 98% of the total land area under 0-2 percent slope category and only 2% of the total area is under the 2.3-5 percent slope category. The excellent topography of the municipality has made irrigation by gravity method applicable in flooding of rice paddies.

== Demographics ==
Population census of San Mateo
Year	Pop.	±% p.a.
1948	13,622	—
1960	24,402	+4.98%
1970	29,604	+1.95%
1975	34,546	+3.14%
1980	41,152	+3.56%
1990	48,461	+1.65%
1995	48,861	+0.15%
2000	55,068	+2.60%
2007	57,885	+0.69%
2010	60,792	+1.80%
2015	64,505	+1.14%
2020	66,663	+0.70%
2024	67,433	+0.28%
Source: Philippine Statistics Authority

In the 2024 census, the population of San Mateo was 67,433 people, with a density of 560 inhabitants per square kilometre or 1,500 inhabitants per square mile.

=== Language ===
The population is a combination of different ethnic group dominated by Ilocano speaking people which make Ilocano the common language used in the municipality.

== Economy ==
Poverty incidence of San Mateo (%)

Source: Philippine Statistics Authority

According to the 2020 Cities and Municipalities Competitiveness Index conducted by the National Competitiveness Council, San Mateo took the 141st spot among the first class and second class municipalities in the Philippines.

- 2015 44th
- 2016 99th
- 2017 123rd
- 2018 92nd
- 2019 72nd
- 2020 141st
- 2021 292nd
- 2022 242nd
- 2023 160th

== Culture ==
The San Mateo Town Fiesta is an annual cultural and civic celebration held every March 17 in the municipality of San Mateo. The event commemorates the town's founding anniversary and serves as a major highlight in the local calendar, attracting residents, visitors, and dignitaries from neighboring areas.

The Munggo Festival, also locally known as the Balatong Festival, is an annual cultural celebration held in the first week of May in the town. The festival is dedicated to honoring and giving thanks to God for the abundance and blessings of the munggo (mung bean) harvest—one of the municipality's primary agricultural products.

== Government ==
=== Local government ===
As a municipality in the Province of Isabela, government officials at the provincial and municipal levels are voted by the town. The provincial government has political jurisdiction over most local transactions of the municipal government.

The municipality of San Mateo is governed by a mayor, designated as its local chief executive, and by a municipal council as its legislative body in accordance with the Local Government Code. The mayor, vice mayor, and the municipal councilors are elected directly in polls held every three years.

Barangays are also headed by elected officials: Barangay Captain, Barangay Council, whose members are called Barangay Councilors. The barangays have SK federation which represents the barangay, headed by SK chairperson and whose members are called SK councilors. All officials are also elected every three years.

=== Elected Officials ===
Members of the San Mateo Municipal Council (2025–2028)
Position	Name
District Representative	Ian Paul L. Dy
Municipal Mayor	Gregorio A. Pua
Municipal Vice-Mayor	Alan L. Cabacungan
Municipal Councilors	Jennifer G. Ramones
Municipal Councilors	Lailo Paulo R. Palomares
Municipal Councilors	Atty. Eric P. Subia
Municipal Councilors	Sherwin R. Cadeliña
Municipal Councilors	Geo Niko R. Villarta
Municipal Councilors	Roberto C. Agcaoili
Municipal Councilors	Aristoteles M. Visaya
Municipal Councilors	Jonathan M. Barangan
IPMR	Valerie P. Galamay
LMB President	Edilberto B. De Leon
SK Federation President	Angelo A. Corpuz

=== Punong Barangay ===
Members of the Liga ng mga Barangay (2022–2025)
Barangay	Name
Bacarreña	Ronaldo P. Cabacungan, Sr.
Bagong Sikat	Wilson Salvador
Barangay 1	Aristoteles Visaya
Barangay 2	Arnelyn Daynos
Barangay 3	Rogelio Dumgca
Barangay 4	Leo Umipig
Bella Luz	Julie Pua
Dagupan	Rizalito Manglal-lan
Daramuangan Norte	Marcelo Lamog
Daramuangan Sur	George Saguibo
Estrella	Ronnie Constantino
Gaddanan	Robert Barboza
Malasin	Edilberto De Leon
Marasat Grande	Jomar Antonio
Marasat Pequeño	Manuelito Baris
Old Centro Proper	Elizabeth Trinidad
Old Centro 1	Noel Visitacion
Salinungan West	Genaro Reyno
Salinungan East	Ranny Fabros
San Andres	Juan Baniaga Jr.
San Antonio	Andres Cristobal
San Ignacio	Deogracias Cabiles
San Manuel	Ferdinand Valdez
San Marcos	Ruperto De Guzman
San Roque	Marino Yahin
Sinamar Norte	Ysmael Sable
Sinamar Sur	Mamer Antonio
Victoria	Joseph Lorenzo
Villa Cruz	Quirino Cardenas
Villa Gamiao	Sonny Baysa
Villa Magat	Edrey Matias
Villa Fuerte	Rolando Tamayo

=== Sangguniang Kabataan Chairpersons ===
Members of the Pambayang Pederasyon ng mga Sangguniang Kabataan (2023–2025)
Barangay	Name
Bacarreña	Alexis Galiza
Bagong Sikat	Jayrald Subia
Barangay 1	Eliza Mina
Barangay 2	Mike Porillo
Barangay 3	Liwelyn Patricio
Barangay 4	AJ Laderas
Bella Luz	Lovelie Tomas
Dagupan	Jhan Jhan Ilarde
Daramuangan Norte	Mariella Calingasan
Daramuangan Sur	Jau Walter Baniaga
Estrella	Klein Robert Ariete
Gaddanan	Ma. Arabella Himoldang
Malasin	Menci Mamaspas III
Marasat Grande	Katreena Daño
Marasat Pequeño	Eian Sinuto
Old Centro I	Darel Castillo
Old Centro II	Kyla Ucol
Salinungan East	Joe Ana Marie Cadiz
Salinungan West	Paul Angelo Castroverde
San Andres	John Mark Donato
San Antonio	Angelo Corpuz
San Ignacio	Edward Salvador
San Manuel	Marlyn Valenzuela
San Marcos	Christian Remigio
San Roque	Mike Mariano
Sinamar Norte	Rollie Aguinaldo
Sinamar Sur	Jhonny Domingo
Victoria	Ernesto Astrero Jr.
Villa Cruz	William Talvo
Villa Gamiao	Reymon Patricio
Villa Magat	Aristotle Bombarda
Villafuerte	Celes Joy Llavore

=== Congress representation ===
San Mateo, belonging to the third legislative district of the province of Isabela, currently represented by Hon. Ian Paul L. Dy.

=== MAYORS OF SAN MATEO, ISABELA ===
Barangay	Name
1942	Doroteo Barbero
1943	Estanislao Bueno
1946	Don Mateo Cadeliña
1947 - 1951	Cornelio Alipio
1951 - 1955	Don Mateo Cadeliña
1955 - 1959	Marcelo Santiago
1959 - 1962	Hermogenes Ramil
1962 - 1963	Braulio Lucas
1963 - 1986	Severo Lachica
1986 - 1998	Dr. Venancio O. Villarta
1998 - 2001	Feliciano Palomares
2001 - 2010	Roberto C. Agcaoili
2010 - 2019	Dra. Crispina R. Agcaoili
2019–Present	Atty. Gregorio A. Pua (Ret. Col.)

=== Provincial Leaders from San Mateo ===
San Mateo also produced provincial leaders which include Governor Gabriel Visaya, Third District Board Members which include Severo Lachica and Dr. Venancio O. Villarta, and appointed Agricultural Representative to the Sangguniang Panlalawigan Napoleon Hernandez II.

== Healthcare ==
- BBCSS Pediatric Medical And Surgical Clinic
- Bumagat Maternity and Medical Clinic
- Juvelo Family Clinic
- New Samaritan Medical And Pediatric Clinic
- Piedad Medical Clinic
- Ricafort's Medical and Surgical Clinic
- San Mateo Integrated Community Hospital
- San Mateo Kidney Care and Dialysis Center
- San Mateo Multicare Hospital
- San Mateo Rural Health Unit
- Sevilleja Medical Clinic

== Education ==
The Schools Division of Isabela governs the town's public education system. The division office is a field office of the DepEd in Cagayan Valley region. There are two schools district offices that govern the public and private elementary and high schools throughout the municipality, namely: San Mateo North District, and San Mateo South District.

=== Primary and elementary schools ===
- Bagong Sikat Elementary School - Main
- Bagong Sikat Elementary School - Unit 1
- Bagong Sikat Elementary School - Annex 2
- Bacarreña Adventist Elementary School
- Dagupan Elementary School
- Daramuangan Norte Elementary School
- Daramuangan Sur Elementary School
- Diamond Christian School
- Estrella-Bella Luz Elementary School
- Estrella Elementary School
- Gaddanan Elementary School
- Grace Christian School
- La Salette of San Mateo
- Malasin Elementary School
- Mapuroc Elementary School
- Marasat Pequeño Elementary School
- Mary Shine School of Saint Matthew
- Salinungan East Elementary School
- San Antonio Elementary School
- San Ignacio Elementary School
- San Manuel Elementary School
- San Marcos Elementary School
- San Mateo East Central School
- San Mateo North Central School
- San Mateo West Central School
- San Roque Elementary School
- Sinamar Norte Elementary School
- Sinamar Sur Dumag Elementary School
- The Rainbow Learning Center
- Victoria Integrated School
- Villa Cruz Elementary School
- Villa Fuerte Elementary School
- Villa Gamiao Elementary School
- Villa Magat Elementary School
- Wonder Years Montessori Center

=== Secondary schools ===
- Eveland Christian College
- La Salette of San Mateo
- Salinungan National High School
- Salinungan Stand Alone Senior High School
- San Mateo General Comprehensive High School
- San Mateo National High School
- San Mateo Vocational Industrial High School
- The Rainbow learning Center
- Victoria Integrated School

=== Higher educational institutions ===
- Isabela State University
