= Angadanan =

Municipality in Isabela, Philippines

Angadanan Angadanan Nuevo
- Municipality
- Municipality of Angadanan
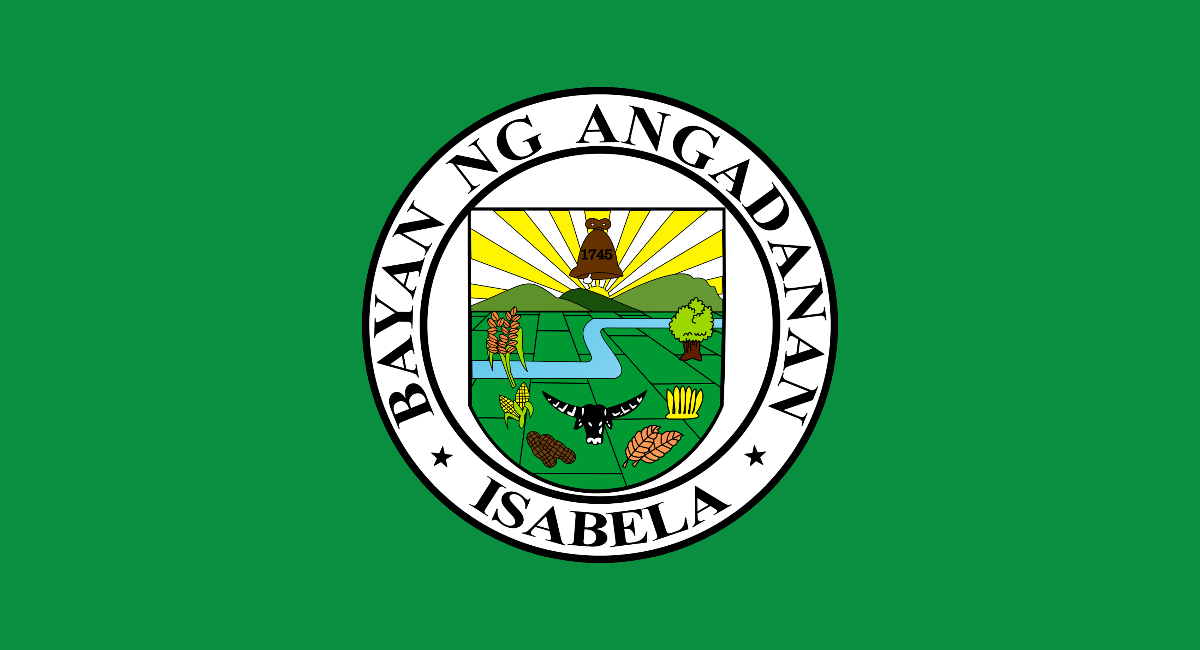
- Flag Seal

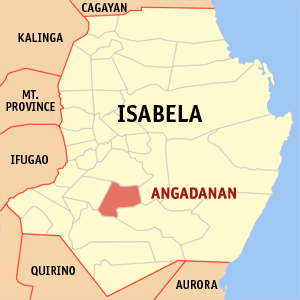
- Map of Isabela with Angadanan highlighted
- Interactive map of Angadanan
- Location within the Philippines
- Coordinates: 16°45′26″N 121°44′53″E
- Country: Philippines
- Region: Cagayan Valley
- Province: Isabela
- District: 3rd district
- Founded: 1745
- Barangays: 59 (see Barangays)

Government
  - Type: Sangguniang Bayan
  - Mayor: Joelle Mathea S. Panganiban
  - Vice Mayor: Lourdes S. Panganiban
  - Representative: Ian Paul L. Dy
  - Electorate: 28,877 voters (2025)

Area
  - Total: 204.40 km^{2} (78.92 sq mi)
- Elevation: 64 m (210 ft)
- Highest elevation: 106 m (348 ft)
- Lowest elevation: 41 m (135 ft)

Population (2024 census)
  - Total: 45,970
  - Density: 224.9/km^{2} (582.5/sq mi)
  - Households: 11,130

Economy
  - Income class: 1st municipal income class
  - Poverty incidence: 15.2% (2023)
  - Revenue: ₱ 236 million (2024)
  - Assets: ₱ 876.9 million (2024)
  - Expenditure: ₱ 220.7 million (2024)
  - Liabilities: ₱ 118 million (2024)

Service provider
  - Electricity: Isabela 1 Electric Cooperative (ISELCO 1)
- Time zone: UTC+8 (PST)
- ZIP code: 3307
- PSGC: 0203102000
- IDD : area code: +63 (0)78
- Native languages: Ilocano; Gaddang; Tagalog
- Website: www.angadanan.gov.ph

Angadanan, officially the Municipality of Angadanan (Ilocano: Ili ti Angadanan; Tagalog: Bayan ng Angadanan; or Angadanan Nuevo), is a municipality in the province of Isabela, Philippines. According to the 2024 census, it has a population of 45,970 people.

== Etymology ==
The town derived its name from the nearby Angaranan Creek, a notable geographical feature of the area. The creek serves a significant role in the early development and identity of the settlement. The creek's presence influenced the local ecosystem by providing a source of potable water for both people and livestock. It also likely served as a critical landmark for the town's first inhabitants. The decision to name the town after Angaranan Creek reflects the community's connection to the natural landscape and highlights the importance of the creek in the town's history and daily life.

== History ==
The town of Angadanan was initially founded in the mid-18th century on the site of a Gaddang settlement in what is present-day Nueva Vizcaya, between the towns of Bagabag and Bayombong. It took its name from Gaddanan, the local chief. In 1776, Spaniards decided to move the settlement further north in present-day Isabela province along the Ganano river, a tributary of the Cagayan River. In the 19th century, the Spaniards decided to move the town again six kilometers further east to its present location along the Cagayan River to facilitate better transportation links and to secure the town from repeated raids by the Igorots and Gaddangs. The second site was subsequently known as Angadanan Viejo (Old Angadanan) and the current site called Angadanan Nuevo (New Angadanan) until the former was converted into a separate municipality in 1949 named Alicia and the Nuevo was dropped from its official name.

== Geography ==
Angadanan is 58.56 kilometres (36.39 mi) from the provincial capital Ilagan, and 388.54 kilometres (241.43 mi) from the capital Manila.

=== Barangays ===
Angadanan is politically subdivided into 59 barangays. Each barangay consists of puroks while some have sitios. Each is governed by a Barangay Captain with Kagawad of each purok and Tanod to protect their respective Barangays

- Allangigan
- Aniog
- Baniket
- Bannawag
- Bantug
- Barangcuag
- Baui
- Bonifacio
- Buenavista
- Bunnay
- Calabayan-Minanga
- Calaccab
- Calaocan
- Kalusutan
- Campanario
- Canangan
- Centro I (Poblacion)
- Centro II (Poblacion)
- Centro III (Poblacion)
- Consular
- Cumu
- Dalakip
- Dalenat
- Dipaluda
- Duroc
- Lourdes (El Escaño)
- Esperanza
- Fugaru
- Liwliwa
- Ingud Norte
- Ingud Sur
- La Suerte
- Lomboy
- Loria
- Mabuhay
- Macalauat
- Macaniao
- Malannao
- Malasin
- Mangandingay
- Minanga Proper
- Pappat
- Pissay
- Ramona
- Rancho Bassit
- Rang-ayan
- Salay
- San Ambrocio
- San Guillermo
- San Isidro
- San Marcelo
- San Roque
- San Vicente
- Santo Niño
- Saranay
- Sinabbaran
- Victory
- Viga
- Villa Domingo

=== Climate ===
Climate data for Angadanan, Isabela
Month	Jan	Feb	Mar	Apr	May	Jun	Jul	Aug	Sep	Oct	Nov	Dec	Year
Mean daily maximum °C (°F)	29 (84)	30 (86)	32 (90)	35 (95)	35 (95)	35 (95)	34 (93)	33 (91)	32 (90)	31 (88)	30 (86)	28 (82)	32 (90)
Mean daily minimum °C (°F)	19 (66)	20 (68)	21 (70)	23 (73)	23 (73)	24 (75)	23 (73)	23 (73)	23 (73)	22 (72)	21 (70)	20 (68)	22 (71)
Average precipitation mm (inches)	31.2 (1.23)	23 (0.9)	27.7 (1.09)	28.1 (1.11)	113.5 (4.47)	141.4 (5.57)	176.4 (6.94)	236.6 (9.31)	224.9 (8.85)	247.7 (9.75)	222.9 (8.78)	178 (7.0)	1,651.4 (65)
Average rainy days	10	6	5	5	13	12	15	15	15	17	16	15	144
Source: World Weather Online

== Demographics ==
Population census of Angadanan
Year	Pop.	±% p.a.
1903	5,249	—
1918	9,487	+4.02%
1939	16,047	+2.53%
1948	17,011	+0.65%
1960	19,600	+1.19%
1970	22,820	+1.53%
1975	23,623	+0.70%
1980	27,706	+3.24%
1990	32,548	+1.62%
1995	33,145	+0.34%
2000	36,788	+2.26%
2007	39,743	+1.07%
2010	40,143	+0.37%
2015	43,061	+1.35%
2020	44,977	+0.92%
2024	45,970	+0.53%
Source: Philippine Statistics Authority

In the 2024 census, the population of Angadanan was 45,970 people, with a density of 220 inhabitants per square kilometre or 570 inhabitants per square mile.

Ethnic groups include the Ilocanos, Gaddang, Ibanags, Yogads, and the Tagalogs.

== Economy ==
Poverty incidence of Angadanan

Source: Philippine Statistics Authority

== Government ==
=== Local government ===
As a municipality in the Province of Isabela, government officials in the provincial and municipal levels are voted by the town. The provincial government has political jurisdiction over most local transactions of the municipal government.

The municipality of Angadanan is governed by a mayor, designated as its local chief executive, and by a municipal council as its legislative body in accordance with the Local Government Code. The mayor, vice mayor, and the municipal councilors are elected directly by the people through an election held every three years.

Barangays are also headed by elected officials: Barangay Captain, Barangay Council, whose members are called Barangay Councilors. The barangays have SK federation which represents the barangay, headed by SK chairperson and whose members are called SK councilors. All officials are also elected every three years.

=== Elected officials ===
Members of the Municipal Council (2025–2028)
Position	Name
Congressman	Ian Paul L. Dy
Mayor	Joelle Mathea S. Panganiban
Vice-Mayor	Lourdes S. Panganiban
Councilors	Diosdado S. Siquian
Councilors	Yolanda B. Alog
Councilors	Jimmy A. Rivera
Councilors	Reynaldo P. Panganiban, Jr.
Councilors	Joy Lopez
Councilors	Porfirio U. Gomez
Councilors	Marcelo Valdez
Councilors	Rolando D. Cabasag

=== Congress representation ===
Angadanan, belonging to the third legislative district of the province of Isabela, currently represented by Hon. Ian Paul L. Dy.

== Education ==
The Schools Division of Isabela governs the town's public education system. The division office is a field office of the DepEd in Cagayan Valley region. The office governs the public and private elementary and public and private high schools throughout the municipality. Angadanan schools are grouped into two districts: Angadanan East, and Angadanan West.

=== Primary and elementary schools ===
- Allangigan Elementary School
- Angadanan Central School
- Angadanan East Central School
- Aniog Primary School
- Bannawag Primary School
- Bantug Primary School
- Barangcuag Elementary School
- Boni-Ban Elementary School
- Buenavista Primary School
- Bunnay Elementary School
- Calabayan Elementary School
- Calaccab Elementary School
- Calaocan Elementary School
- Campanario Primary School
- Canangan Primary School
- Consular Elementary School
- Dalakip Elementary School
- Dalenat Elementary School
- Dipaluda Primary School
- Duroc Integrated School
- La Suerte Elementary School
- Liw-liwa Primary School
- Lourdes Elementary School
- Lunac Primary School
- Macalauat Elementary School
- Malasin Elementary School
- Mangandingay Primary School
- Minanga Elementary School
- Minanga-Baniket Elementary School
- Pisbakal Elementary School
- Rancho Primary School
- Salay Elementary School
- San Ambrocio Elementary School
- San Isidro Elementary School
- San Marcelo Elementary School
- San Roque Elementary School
- San Vicente Elementary School
- Saranay Primary School
- Sinabbaran Elementary School
- Victory Elementary School
- Viga Elementary School
- Villa Domingo Elementary School

=== Secondary schools ===
- Angadanan High School
- Angadanan Living Hope Learning School
- Cadaloria High School
- Cumu Integrated School
- Duroc Integrated School
- Fugaru Integrated School
- Ingud-Ramona Integrated School
- La Suerte High School
- Lomboy Integrated School
- Rang- Ayan Integrated School
- School of St. Vincent
- Villa Domingo National High School
