= Cabatuan =

Cabatuan is the name of three places in the Philippines:

- Cabatuan, Iloilo
- Cabatuan, Isabela
- Cabatuan, Palapag, Northern Samar
- Cabatuan, Botolan, Zambales

== See also ==
- Cabanatuan
