= Cabatuan, Isabela =

Municipality in Isabela, Philippines

Cabatuan
- Municipality
- Municipality of Cabatuan
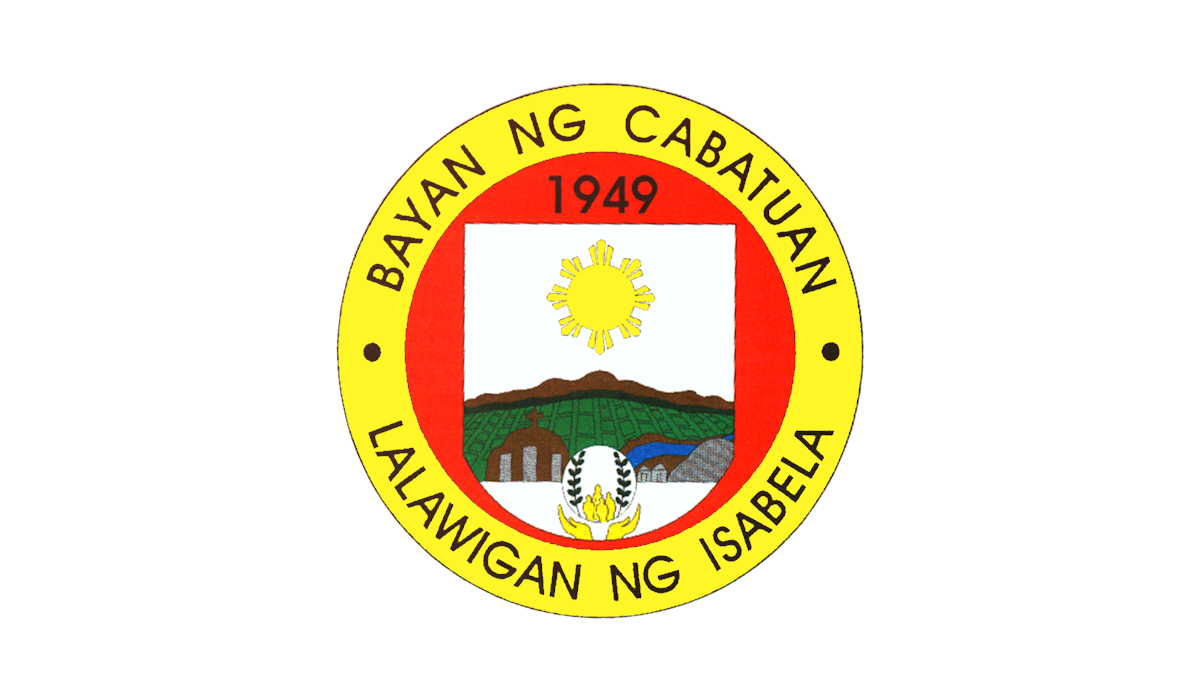
- Flag Seal
- Nickname: Land of the Golden Grains
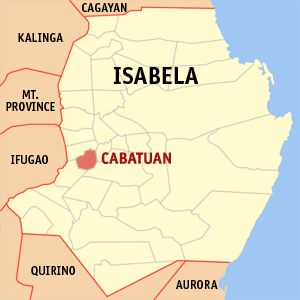
- Map of Isabela with Cabatuan highlighted
- Interactive map of Cabatuan
- Location within the Philippines
- Coordinates: 16°57′32″N 121°40′09″E
- Country: Philippines
- Region: Cagayan Valley
- Province: Isabela
- District: 3rd district
- Founded: November 5, 1949
- Barangays: 22 (see Barangays)

Government
  - Type: Sangguniang Bayan
  - Mayor: Charlton “Tonton” L. Uy
  - Vice Mayor: Dr. Mario I. Acosta
  - Representative: Ian Paul L. Dy
  - Electorate: 26,018 voters (2025)

Area
  - Total: 72.00 km^{2} (27.80 sq mi)
- Elevation: 59 m (194 ft)
- Highest elevation: 76 m (249 ft)
- Lowest elevation: 44 m (144 ft)

Population (2024 census)
  - Total: 40,223
  - Density: 558.7/km^{2} (1,447/sq mi)
  - Households: 9,843

Economy
  - Income class: 1st municipal income class
  - Poverty incidence: 9.74% (2023)
  - Revenue: ₱ 250.2 million (2024)
  - Assets: ₱ 757.4 million (2024)
  - Expenditure: ₱ 196.8 million (2024)
  - Liabilities: ₱ 151.3 million (2024)

Service provider
  - Electricity: Isabela 1 Electric Cooperative (ISELCO 1)
- Time zone: UTC+8 (PST)
- ZIP code: 3315
- PSGC: 0203107000
- IDD : area code: +63 (0)78
- Native languages: Ilocano; Tagalog
- Website: cabatuan-isabela.gov.ph

Cabatuan, officially the Municipality of Cabatuan (Ilocano: Ili ti Cabatuan; Tagalog: Bayan ng Cabatuan), is a municipality in the province of Isabela, Philippines. According to the 2024 census, it has a population of 40,223 people.

Being a major rice producing town dubbed as the Land of the Golden Grains, it is home to several rice mills and rice traders.

== Etymology ==
The act of throwing stones is called "ambatuan". This then evolved to "cabatuan" when Ilocano people who settled in the area used stones to drive away Kalingas.

== History ==
=== Indigenous settlements ===
The early inhabitants of the vast forest land were the Kalingas who are indigenous to the mountain provinces. These settlers lived on tree houses which they built along the banks of Magat River. These sturdy, dark complexioned, G-stringed, soldier-like people depended on hunting, fishing and a little agriculture and poultry.

The land where Cabatuan now nestles was once teeming with vegetation, wildlife and fish, nurtured by the Magat River. Its history started when one of the indigenous people of the mountain provinces settled down in the Cagayan Valley where the Apayaos, Dumagats, Gaddangs, Ibanags, Ifugaos, Igorots, Itawes, Palananons and the Yogads were living. This tribe is known as the Kalingas, the name believed to have come from the Ibanag and Gaddang word, which means "headhunters". The Kalinga villages were strategically located along the banks of the Magat River in south-western Isabela near the boundary of Ifugao province, surrounding the locality now known as Sili, Bolinao, Dalig Kalinga (these places are now barangays of Aurora town) and Subasta (now a sitio of Barangay Saranay in Cabatuan). The early Cabatuanenses were generally known to be medium in height, with dark complexion and lissome with high nose bridges. Physically, they were very sturdy and well-built so that their war-like bearing feature made them more like soldiers. They lived on tree-houses and depended on hunting, fishing and a little of poultry and agriculture. The Kalingas were believed to be the descendants of the second wave of Malay who came to the Islands from Borneo. These pagans were headed by several able leaders like: Ronsan and Ngolan (both from Sili in Aurora town), Balindan, Melad and Gombi (from Bolinao, also in Aurora), Tullayao Bayudoc (from Subasta, Saranay in Cabatuan) and the grand old chieftain Materig (also from Sili in Aurora).

The Kalingas preferred to stay in the Cabatuan area of jurisdiction rather than in Aurora because the town proper of Aurora then was located in Dalig, now a barangay of Burgos town.

When the Christians arrived, the Kalingas attached the word "Infiel" before their native name to fulfill their yearning for a second name like those of Christians. The name "Infiel" was derived from "ynfieles", a Spanish friar's term for non-believers of the Christian faith.

=== Ilocano migration ===
In 1912, the Ilocanos started arriving with their families, relatives and friends. The Ilocanos settled away from the river but the Kalingas considered it an intrusion which later led to encounters where the Ilocanos used piles of stones to drive away the Kalingas. The act of throwing stones was called “ambatuan” which later evolved to “cabatuan”. The warring groups eventually became friends through a peace pact led by their respective leaders and the place became known as Cabatuan.

There are Ilocano migrants that also came from Central Luzon. Some of those Ilocano pioneers from Central Luzon are: Anselmo S. Esmino (Licab, Nueva Ecija), Andres Alivia (Rizal, Nueva Ecija) and Antonio V. Altoveros (Rizal, Nueva Ecija).

After the Ilocano migrants, several waves of settlers particularly locals from Pangasinan and Central Luzon came to Isabela as merchants. Some of the Pangasinan pioneers were: Nicolas T. Almirol (originally surnamed Lagasca), Benito Monte, Hermogenes B. Soriben and Zacarias P. Munoz.

The Kapampangan migrants are: Atanasio H. Dayrit (San Fernando, Pampanga) and a certain Pamintuan (Pampanga).

The Tagalog migrants are: Carlino O. Munsayac (Nueva Ecija) and Atty. Rafael M. Tomacruz (then Mayor of Hagonoy, Bulacan and Provincial Board Member).

The Chinese also migrated to Cabatuan and opted to reside there and marry young Ilocano women. The bulk of the Chinese migrants came from Amoy in the 1930s. The Chinese migrants were: Clemente Paggabao (married Andrea Labasan), Eusebio Uy (married Lourdes Visaya), Juan Uy (married Felisa Acio), Mariano Uy (married Lourdes dela Cruz), Kaya Uy (married Carmen Rambac), Inocencio Uy (married Mercedes Domingcil), Francisco Uy (married Mercedes Llamelo), Guillermo Uy (married Tomasa Padron), Lorenzo Uy (married Teodora Visaya), Venancio Tio (married Monica Acorda), Vicente Pua (married Sabina Ventura), Joaquin Pua (married Entonia Labayog), Pedro Pua (married Isabela Guerrero), Kiana Uy (married Claudia Manuel), Pascual Pua (married Carmen Uy), Densoy Ty (married Maxima Uy), Tomas Uy, Miguel Dy, Mariano Tio, Julian Pua (married Felicitas Bagcal), Eusebio Tan (married Eusenia Lomotan), Jose Uy (married Adelina Ventura), Ben Chong (married Gue Eng Tio), Alfonso Uy (married Engracia Uy), Sytong Uy, Uwa Uy (married Avelina Gervacio), Ben Co (married Maria Vea), Pedro Ong (married Salud Bacallan), Pedro Tan (married Maria Aczon), Tio Nga Luy (married Pelagia Acosta), Alfredo Uy (married Ruperta V. Pancho)

=== As a barrio of Cauayan ===
In 1914, during the American Regime, Cabatuan was incorporated with the Municipality of Cauayan, Isabela with Agapito A. Pilar as the first Barrio Teniente. Others who assumed the post were: Florencio Abad, Leocadio Acio, Pedro Acob, Felipe Aczon, Tomas Camungao, T. Damunglo, Jose Castillo, Cirilo Guerrero, Platon Guillermo, Ignacio Juan, Antonio S. Medina, Felipe Pascual, Feliciano A. Ramos, Roman Rivera, Inigo Sales, Francisco Salvador, Tirso Santos, B. Sumawang and Juan Ventura. Bernardo C. Dacuycuy, the acknowledged founder of Cabatuan, was appointed by Governor-General Leonard Wood as President of the Confederate Districts of Antatet (now Luna), Dalig, Bolinao and Sili. Later on, Cabatuan was sub-divided into four districts. District 1, comprises what is now the barangays of Sampaloc and Saranay. District 2, the barrio proper, comprises what is now the barangays of Centro and San Andres. District 3, comprises what is now the barangays of Del Pilar, Magdalena and portions of Paraiso. And District 4, comprises all populated areas upstream the Magat River like Macalaoat, Culing and Diamantina.

=== Early politics ===
The desire to have a representation for the Magat region prompted the Cabatuanenses to support the candidacy of several of their barrio folks. Thus, the administrations of Cauayan Mayors Guillermo Blas (1938) and Zoilo Cuntapay (1938-1940), three of their Municipal Councilors hailed from Cabatuan. They were: Paz Sales-Cruz, Francisco Razon and Atanasio H. Dayrit. Realizing their strong political power in Cauayan, the Cabatuanenses supported Federico P. Acio as mayor. Acio won and assumed office in 1941 but his term was cut short when the Japanese Imperial Army occupied the town. Acio was replaced by Jose Canciller.

=== Second World War ===
When the Second World War erupted, several residents of Cabatuan were involved in various encounters in the countryside. Some Cabatuanenses who fought in the Battle of Bataan were: Norberto V. Abad (suffered the Death March), Dominador Acob (suffered the Death March), Victorino R. Agustin, Leopoldo Cadeliria (suffered the Death March), Alejandro A. Cadiente (suffered the Death March), Ventura D. Frogoso, Elpidio A. Galiza, Domingo J. Marcelo, Juan B. Molina (suffered the Death March), Ranulfo Navarro, Andres N. Palado, Cenon B. Ramos, Jose M. Rivera, Florencio B. Sacaben (suffered the Death March), Simeon B. Santos, Victorino O. Santos (missing in action), Lorenzo T. Sunga, Manuel T. Talimada, Damian S. Tomacruz and Hermogenes S. Tomas. Some Cabatuanenses who fought outside Bataan were: Benedicto A. Acosta (Ilocos), Teodoro P. Asuncion (died in action in Tuguegarao, Cagayan), Sebastian M. Ballesteros (Ilocos), Rizalino M. Camungao (died in action in Batangas), Florencia M. Dacuycuy (Women's Auxiliary Service in Ilocos) and Enrique Padron (died in action in Tuguegarao).

As the Japanese Imperial Army occupied the town after the Fall of Bataan, strong resistance continued. Many Cabatuanenses joined the underground "guerilla" movement, locally known as the Bolo Unit. Some Guerillas from Cabatuan were: Federico P. Acio, Damaso A. Acosta, Mariano P. Alejo, Antonio V. Altoveros, Nestor R. Altoveros, Alvaro C. Antolin, Rufino D. Apostol, Benito G. Bauzon, Osmundo S. Bungay, Pacifico S. Cabantac, Felix G. Cadelina, Norberto Cadiz, Demetrio dela Cruz, Leonides R. Dacuycuy, Gavino K. Enerlan, Fernando A. Ferrer, Apolonio R. Galicano, Patrocinio Gamiao, Venancio Galingana, Santos D. Gonatise, Iluminado Grande, Lino P. Gumaru, Jose G. Hermogela, Nicolas Labayog, Juan R. Labuguen, Celestino G. Lomboy, Cenon S. Manibog, Venancio G. Manibog, Juan G. Manuel, Isaac I. Martinez, Cipriano D. Mercado, Nicolas Meria, Miguel O. Monte, Sixta C. Juan, Dionisio B. Juan, Andres E. Nomina, Domingo Pedro, Nemesio N. Ramil, Antonio B. Rodriguez, Cayetano K. Rosario, Teodulfo D. Rumbaoa, Maura A. Sales, Domingo D. Salgado, Severino Tarapia, Juanito S. Topinio, Juan P. Valeroso, Avelino A. Villanueva, Vicente Villar and Juan G. Visaya.

Mayor Acio was one of the remaining mayors of northern Luzon who refused to surrender to the Japanese, who tried to make him surrender by torturing his wife, Josefa Ventura-Acio, through "water treatment". In reality, Mrs. Acio never knew the whereabouts of her husband and her suffering continued until before Liberation.

The tabacalera (almasin), now owned by Bernardo Bulosan Garcia Sr, in District (now Barangay San Andres) became the chief garrison (Center of Command) of the Japanese. Other prominent Japanese garrisons were the residences of Federico Acio, Francisco Acob and Daniel Crisologo. The guerillas continued their underground activities and were fully supported by the barrio people. The Japanese troops made plans to liquidate the resistance. The Japanese soldiers hired Filipinos to serve as "magic eyes" (Makapili) to pinpoint supporters and members of the movement. The civilians who were tagged and assassinated were: Catalino Pascual, Ireneo Acedo, Severino Tarampi and a certain Mr. Gomez. There was also an incident where the Japanese kidnapped a woman by the name of Genoveva A. Agsalda (residing in what is now Barangay San Andres) while reaping tobacco in her field (in Sili) and was not seen again.

When the American warplanes arrived, a house in District Dos (now San Andres) where at least two families were residing was mistakenly identified as a Japanese camp. The house was heavily bombarded killing all its inhabitants. The fatalities were: Agustin Duldulao and wife Josefa Mercado with sister Teodorica M. Visaya. The Duldulao children were: Aprecion, Emeteria, Severo, Angel, Teofilo and the eldest, Demetrio and wife Demetria Aczon with their three-months old baby girl, Angeles.

=== Separation as a town ===
The Municipal Council of Cauayan in 1948 agreed and endorsed the segregation of Cabatuan from the mother town. Through the initiative of the delegation formed by leaders who hailed from Barrio Cabatuan, Executive Order 293 creating the Municipality of Cabatuan was finally signed by President Elpidio R. Quirino in Malacañang on November 5, 1949.

On November 30, 1949, the set of municipal officials appointed by President Quirino took their oath of office.

== Geography ==
Cabatuan occupies a land area of 7,200 hectares. It lies in the south-western part of Isabela bounded on the north by Aurora, on the east by Luna, on the west by San Mateo, and on the south by Cauayan City. Its territorial boundaries are more specifically delineated under Executive Order 293 issued by President Elpidio Quirino on November 5, 1949.

Cabatuan is situated 42.89 kilometres (26.65 mi) from the provincial capital Ilagan, and 394.61 kilometres (245.20 mi) from the country's capital Manila.

=== Barangays ===
Upon the creation of Cabatuan in 1949, twelve barrios were extracted from the mother-town of Cauayan. They were: Cabatuan (as the seat of government), Buenavista, Caggong, Canan, Culing, Diamantina, Luzon, Macalaoat, Magdalena, Namnama, Tandul Viejo and Villa Visaya. The three sitios were: Nueva Era, Sampaloc and Saranay.

In 1951, a major re-organization was made creating the new barrios of: Calaocan (from Culing), Centro East (from the old Barrio of Cabatuan-poblacion), Centro West (from the old Barrio of Cabatuan-poblacion), La Paz (from Canan and Namnama), Nueva Era 1 (from Culing), Nueva Era 2 (from Culing), Sampaloc and Saranay. Barrio Buenavista, on the other hand, was joined with Barrio Caggong while Barrio Villa Visaya was also incorporated with Barrio Diamantina.

In 1956, two additional barrios were formed. Barrio Del Pilar was created from Magdalena while Barrio Del Corpuz was extracted from Nueva Era 1.

In 1964, Barrio Centro West was renamed to T. Abad honoring one of the founders of Cabatuan, Senor Teodoro Abad while Barrio Centro East was simply called Barrio Centro. Also the same year, Barrio Caggong was re-christened to Rang-ay while Barrio Tandul Viejo was simply called Tandul. Barrio Nueva Era 1 was renamed to Culing West while the remaining fraction of old Culing was called Culing East. Barrio Nueva Era 2 was plainly called Nueva Era.

In 1969, Barrios Culing East and West were chopped to accommodate a new barrio and was named Culing Centro.

The continuous re-organization of the barangay administrative and political set-up divided Barrio Macalaoat and in 1972, the Barrios of Magsaysay and Paraiso were created. The territory of Barrio Magsaysay was derived from the western portion while Barrio Paraiso got its land area at the eastern side of Macalaoat. Also in the same year, Barrio T. Abad was again renamed to San Andres to honor Cabatuan's patron, Saint Andrew the Apostle.

Today the Municipality of Cabatuan has 22 barangays. Each barangay consists of puroks while some have sitios.

- Calaocan
- Canan
- Centro (Poblacion)
- Del Pilar
- Culing Centro
- Culing East
- Culing West
- Del Corpuz
- Diamantina
- La Paz
- Luzon
- Macalaoat
- Magdalena
- Magsaysay
- Namnama
- Nueva Era
- Paraiso
- Rang-ay
- Sampaloc
- San Andres
- Saranay
- Tandul

=== Climate ===
Climate data for Cabatuan, Isabela
Month	Jan	Feb	Mar	Apr	May	Jun	Jul	Aug	Sep	Oct	Nov	Dec	Year
Mean daily maximum °C (°F)	31 (88)	31 (88)	32 (90)	34 (93)	35 (95)	34 (93)	32 (90)	32 (90)	32 (90)	32 (90)	32 (90)	31 (88)	32 (90)
Mean daily minimum °C (°F)	22 (72)	22 (72)	22 (72)	24 (75)	24 (75)	24 (75)	24 (75)	24 (75)	24 (75)	23 (73)	23 (73)	22 (72)	23 (74)
Average precipitation mm (inches)	13.6 (0.54)	10.4 (0.41)	18.2 (0.72)	15.7 (0.62)	178.4 (7.02)	227.9 (8.97)	368 (14.5)	306.6 (12.07)	310.6 (12.23)	215.7 (8.49)	70.3 (2.77)	31.1 (1.22)	1,766.5 (69.56)
Average rainy days	3	2	2	4	14	16	23	21	24	15	10	6	140
Source: World Weather Online

== Demographics ==
Population census of Cabatuan

Year	Pop.	±% p.a.
1960	11,121	—
1970	16,331	+3.91%
1975	18,778	+2.84%
1980	21,399	+2.65%
1990	26,380	+2.12%
1995	28,449	+1.42%

Year	Pop.	±% p.a.
2000	31,659	+2.32%
2007	34,079	+1.02%
2010	37,299	+3.34%
2015	39,413	+1.06%
2020	39,990	+0.31%
2024	40,223	+0.14%

Source: Philippine Statistics Authority

In the 2024 census, the population of Cabatuan was 40,223 people, with a density of 560 inhabitants per square kilometre or 1,500 inhabitants per square mile.

== Economy ==
According to the Bureau of Local Government Finance, the annual regular revenue of Cabatuan for the fiscal year of 2016 was ₱106,631,260.21.

Poverty incidence of Cabatuan (%)

Source: Philippine Statistics Authority

=== Banks ===
- Mallig Plains Rural Bank
- FICO Bank
- Rural Bank of Cauayan
- Producers Bank
- BDO Cabatuan

=== Major establishments ===
- Puregold
- BDO
- 7-Eleven

== Government ==
=== Local government ===
As a municipality in the Province of Isabela, government officials at the provincial and municipal levels are voted by the town. The provincial government has political jurisdiction over most local transactions of the municipal government.

The municipality of Cabatuan is governed by a mayor, designated as its local chief executive, and by a municipal council as its legislative body in accordance with the Local Government Code. The mayor, vice mayor, and the municipal councilors are elected directly by the people through an election held every three years.

Barangays are also headed by elected officials: Barangay Captain, Barangay Council, whose members are called Barangay Councilors. The barangays have SK federation which represents the barangay, headed by SK chairperson and whose members are called SK councilors. All officials are also elected every three years.

=== Elected officials ===
Members of the Cabatuan Municipal Council (2025-2028)
Position	Name
District Representative (3rd Legislative District of the Province of Isabela)	Ian Paul L. Dy
Municipal Mayor	Charlton L. Uy
Municipal Vice Mayor	Dr. Mario I. Acosta
Municipal Councilors
Municipal Councilors	Wilfredo Britanico
Municipal Councilors	Andres “Andy” Alivia III
Municipal Councilors	Eugene I. Acosta
Municipal Councilors	Krischan Laurado
Municipal Councilors	Mark Lester Cadeliña
Municipal Councilors	Jomar D. Jarvinia
Municipal Councilors	Willie Martin Jr.

=== Congress representation ===
Cabatuan, belonging to the third legislative district of the province of Isabela, is currently represented by Ian Paul L. Dy.

== Infrastructure ==
=== Telecommunication ===
This town has excellent telecommunications facilities. The PLDT provides fixed line services. Wireless mobile communications services are provided by Smart Communications and Globe Telecommunications. Dito Telecommunity is now available offering connectivity service.

== Education ==
The Schools Division of Isabela governs the town's public education system. The division office is a field office of the DepEd in Cagayan Valley region. The schools district offices govern the public and private elementary and public and private high schools throughout the municipality. There are two school districts, namely: Cabatuan East, and Cabatuan West.

=== Primary and elementary schools ===
- Cabatuan East Central School
- Cabatuan West Central School
- Calaocan Elementary School
- Canan Elementary School
- Culing Elementary School
- Diamantina Elementary School
- La Paz Elementary School
- La Salette of Cabatuan
- Luzon Elementary School
- Macalaoat Elementary School
- Namnama Elementary School
- Nazarette Elementary School
- Nueva Era Elementary School
- Ortiz-Saranay Elementary School
- Paraiso Elementary School
- Philippine Yuh Chiau School
- Rang-ay Elementary School
- Tandul Elementary School

=== Secondary schools ===
- Cabatuan National High School
- Diamantina National High School
- La Paz National High School
- La Salette of Cabatuan
- Philippine Yuh Chiau School
