= School of Our Lady of Atocha =

Roman Catholic school in Isabela, Philippines

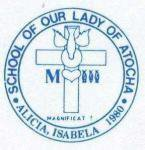

Location
- Magsaysay; Alicia, Isabela; Philippines
- Coordinates: 16°46′41″N 121°41′54″E

Information
- Type: Non-profit Private school
- Motto: Pro-God, Pro-people, Nation-spirited, Pro-life, and Pro-environment (Maka-Diyos, maka-tao, maka-bayan, maka-buhay, and maka-kalikasan)
- Religious affiliation: Roman Catholic
- Established: 1980
- Director: Rev. Fr. Carlito G. Sarte
- Principal: Claire Ysibido
- Enrollment: approx. 1,500
- Language: English, Filipino
- Campus: 6,348 m^{2} (68,330 sq ft)
- Colors: Powder Blue and White
- Nickname: SOLA
- Newspaper: The Magnificat (Latin for 'The Canticle of Mary')
- Affiliations: Catholic Educational Association of the Philippines (CEAP)

The School of Our Lady of Atocha (Filipino: Paaralan ng Birhen ng Atocha) commonly known as SOLA, is a non-stock and non-profit Catholic school located in Magsaysay, Alicia, Isabela, Philippines. It was founded in 1980 and is under the direction of the Diocesan School System of the Diocese of Ilagan, Isabela. There are over 1,500 students enrolled annually.

== History ==
The School of Our Lady of Atocha was founded on February 18, 1980. It was conceptualized and established by the Catholic community of the Municipality of Alicia to address the need for Christian education. On May 7, 1980, the school started to function when the permit to operate in accordance with the provisions of the laws was approved by the Philippine Ministry of Education and Culture.

The school is centrally located in the Poblacion of Alicia. It is occupying a 6,348 sq. meters lot lying adjacent with the 17th Century old Catholic church in Alicia, Our Lady of Atocha Church where the name of the school was derived from in honor of the town's patroness.

The school celebrates its Foundation Day every 18th day of February of every year, with 8 September as the Patroness' Day. It offers instruction in Kindergarten, Elementary and Secondary Education Curriculum.

In 1984, the Sisters of Our Lady of La Salette finally took over the Administration of the School. The Sisters assumed responsibility of managing the school with a mission to evolve a Christian Community that proclaims and witnesses Gospel Values.

The school is managed by the Diocesan School System of the Diocese of Ilagan and a member of the Catholic Educational Association of the Philippines (CEAP) which upholds quality education according to Gospel values. The school is under the jurisdiction of the Cagayan Valley Regional Office of the Philippine Department of Education.

== See also ==
- Philippine Department of Education
