= Isabela's 3rd congressional district =

Legislative district of the Philippines

- Constituency for the House of Representatives of the Philippines
- Boundary of Isabela's 3rd congressional district in Isabela

- Location of Isabela within the Philippines
- Province: Isabela
- Region: Cagayan Valley
- Population: 282,027 (2020)
- Electorate: 180,353 (2025)
- Major settlements: 5 LGUs: Municipalities; Alicia; Angadanan; Cabatuan; Ramon; San Mateo
- Area: 686.27 km^{2} (264.97 sq mi)

Current constituency
- Created: 1987
- Representative: Ian Paul L. Dy
- Political party: Lakas–CMD
- Congressional bloc: Majority

Isabela's 3rd congressional district is one of the six congressional districts of the Philippines in the province of Isabela. It has been represented in the House of Representatives since 1987. The district consists of the west-central municipalities of Alicia, Angadanan, Cabatuan, Ramon and San Mateo. It is currently represented in the 20th Congress by Ian Paul L. Dy of the Lakas–CMD.

Prior to its redistricting effective 2019, which increased the province's districts to six, it consisted of the municipalities of Alicia, Angadanan, Cabatuan, Cauayan, Luna, Reina Mercedes, San Guillermo, and San Mateo.

== Representation history ==
#	Image	Member	Term of office		Congress	Party	Electoral history	Constituent LGUs
#	Image	Member	Start	End	Congress	Party	Electoral history	Constituent LGUs
=== Isabela's 3rd district for the House of Representatives of the Philippines ===
District created February 2, 1987 from Isabela's at-large district.
1		Santiago P. Respicio	June 30, 1987	June 30, 1998	8th	KBL	Elected in 1987.	1987–2019; Alicia, Angadanan, Cabatuan, Cauayan, Luna, Reina Mercedes, San Guillermo, San Mateo
1		Santiago P. Respicio	June 30, 1987	June 30, 1998	9th	NPC	Re-elected in 1992.	1987–2019; Alicia, Angadanan, Cabatuan, Cauayan, Luna, Reina Mercedes, San Guillermo, San Mateo
1		Santiago P. Respicio	June 30, 1987	June 30, 1998	10th	Lakas	Re-elected in 1995.	1987–2019; Alicia, Angadanan, Cabatuan, Cauayan, Luna, Reina Mercedes, San Guillermo, San Mateo
2		Ramon M. Reyes	June 30, 1998	June 30, 2001	11th	LAMMP	Elected in 1998.	1987–2019; Alicia, Angadanan, Cabatuan, Cauayan, Luna, Reina Mercedes, San Guillermo, San Mateo
3		Faustino G. Dy III	June 30, 2001	June 30, 2010	12th	Lakas	Elected in 2001.	1987–2019; Alicia, Angadanan, Cabatuan, Cauayan, Luna, Reina Mercedes, San Guillermo, San Mateo
3		Faustino G. Dy III	June 30, 2001	June 30, 2010	13th	NPC	Re-elected in 2004.	1987–2019; Alicia, Angadanan, Cabatuan, Cauayan, Luna, Reina Mercedes, San Guillermo, San Mateo
3		Faustino G. Dy III	June 30, 2001	June 30, 2010	14th	NPC	Re-elected in 2007.	1987–2019; Alicia, Angadanan, Cabatuan, Cauayan, Luna, Reina Mercedes, San Guillermo, San Mateo
4		Napoleon S. Dy	June 30, 2010	June 30, 2019	15th	NPC	Elected in 2010.	1987–2019; Alicia, Angadanan, Cabatuan, Cauayan, Luna, Reina Mercedes, San Guillermo, San Mateo
4		Napoleon S. Dy	June 30, 2010	June 30, 2019	16th	NPC	Re-elected in 2013.	1987–2019; Alicia, Angadanan, Cabatuan, Cauayan, Luna, Reina Mercedes, San Guillermo, San Mateo
4		Napoleon S. Dy	June 30, 2010	June 30, 2019	17th	NPC	Re-elected in 2016.	1987–2019; Alicia, Angadanan, Cabatuan, Cauayan, Luna, Reina Mercedes, San Guillermo, San Mateo
5		Ian Paul L. Dy	June 30, 2019	Incumbent	18th	NPC	Elected in 2019.	2019–present Alicia, Angadanan, Cabatuan, Ramon, San Mateo
5		Ian Paul L. Dy	June 30, 2019	Incumbent	19th	Lakas	Re-elected in 2022.	2019–present Alicia, Angadanan, Cabatuan, Ramon, San Mateo
5		Ian Paul L. Dy	June 30, 2019	Incumbent	20th	Lakas	Re-elected in 2025.	2019–present Alicia, Angadanan, Cabatuan, Ramon, San Mateo

== Election results ==
=== 2025 ===
Candidate	Party	Votes	%
Ian Paul Dy (incumbent)	Lakas–CMD	118,333	100.00
Total		118,333	100.00
Valid votes		118,333	77.39
Invalid/blank votes		34,570	22.61
Total votes		152,903	100.00
Registered voters/turnout		180,353	84.78
Lakas–CMD hold			
Source: Commission on Elections

=== 2022 ===
2022 Philippine House of Representatives election in Isabela's 3rd District
Party	Candidate	Votes	%
NPC	Ian Paul Dy	113,838	100.00%
Total votes		113,838	100.00%

=== 2019 ===
2019 Philippine House of Representatives election in Isabela's 3rd District
Party	Candidate	Votes	%
NPC	Ian Paul Dy	78,477	
PDP–Laban	Bong Siquian	28,471	
Independent	Cali Abuan	4,512	
Independent	Mailyn Siquian	1,570	
Total votes			
NPC hold			

== See also ==
- Legislative districts of Isabela
