= Magat Dam =

Dam in Luzon, Philippines

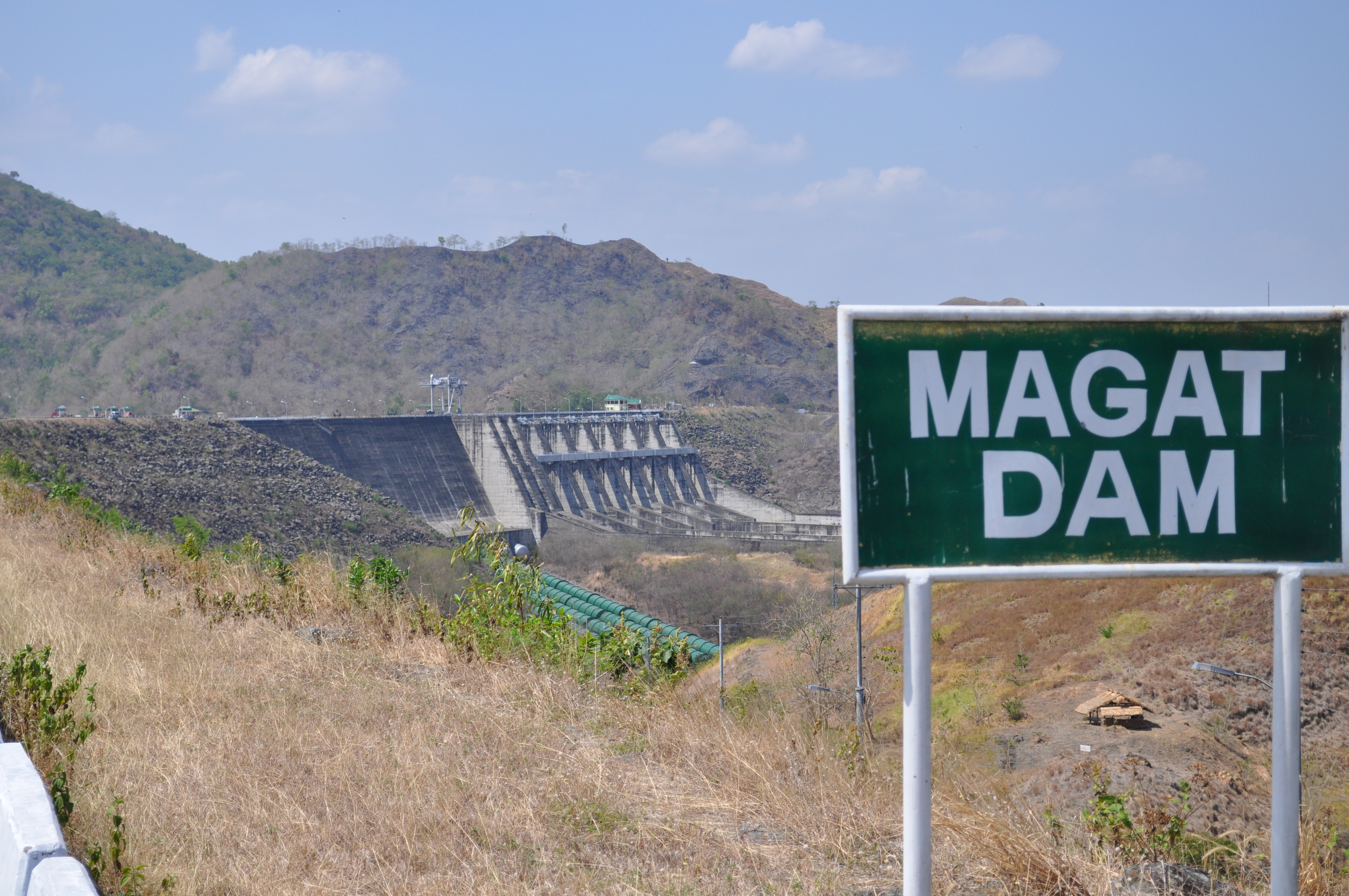
- The dam, with its entrance sign in the foreground

- Location in Luzon Location in the Philippines
- Location: Alfonso Lista, Ifugao / Ramon, Isabela
- Coordinates: 16°49′30″N 121°27′14″E
- Construction began: 1978
- Opening date: 1982

Dam and spillways
- Type of dam: Rock-fill dam
- Impounds: Magat River
- Height: 114 m (374 ft)
- Length: 4,160 m (13,650 ft)

Reservoir
- Surface area: 11.7 km^{2} (4.5 mi^{2})
- Maximum water depth: 193 m (633 ft)

Power Station
- Installed capacity: 360 MW

Magat Dam is a large rock-fill dam in the island of Luzon in the Philippines. The dam is located along the Magat River, a major tributary of the Cagayan River. The construction of the dam started in 1975 and was completed in 1982. It is one of the largest dams in the Philippines. It is a multi-purpose dam which is used primarily for irrigating about 85,000 hectares (210,000 acres) of agricultural lands, flood control, and power generation through the Magat Hydroelectric Power Plant.

The water stored in the reservoir is enough to supply about two months of normal energy requirements.

== History ==
The construction and appurtenant structures were authorized by Presidential Decree No/ 693 signed on May 7, 1975, by then President Ferdinand E. Marcos. The Magat Dam was constructed in 1978, inaugurated by Marcos on October 27, 1982, and started operations in 1983.

Implementation of this multipurpose project was based on the preliminary study conducted in 1973 by the National Irrigation Administration (NIA) with the assistance of the United States Bureau of Reclamation (USBR) and the United States Agency for International Development (USAID).

Subsequent detailed and extensive dam site investigation and engineering studies further confirmed the feasibility of what is now known as NIA's most daring infrastructure project and one of Asia's biggest dams today.

It was Southeast Asia's first large multipurpose dam. The dam is part of the Magat River Multipurpose Project (MRMP) which was financed by the World Bank and whose purpose is to improve on the existing Magat River Irrigation System (MARIS) and to triple the production of rice in the Cagayan River basin.

The project was jointly financed by the Philippine Government and the World Bank which extended a US$150M loan to finance the foreign exchange requirement. In addition, a US$9M loan from Bahrain was obtained for the purchase of other equipment for the diversion tunnel, soil laboratory and model testing. The total project cost is US$3.4B (yr. 1975).

The dam was constructed to last for 50 years but increased siltation and sedimentation in the reservoir, slash-and-burn farming, illegal logging and fish-caging resulted in the deterioration of the dam's watershed. The 1990 Luzon earthquake also contributed to the increased siltation in the Magat River system. Because of this, in January 2006, then President Gloria Macapagal Arroyo instructed various government agencies to create a rehabilitation plan to improve the lifespan of the dam system.

The non-power components such as the dam, reservoir, and intake gates are owned, operated, and managed by the National Irrigation Administration (NIA). The hydroelectric plant was formerly owned by the National Power Corporation (NAPOCOR). Under the Electric Power Industry Reform Act of 2001 (Republic Act No. 9136), the Magat hydroelectric power plant underwent a privatization process. As a result, the plant's ownership and operation was turned over to SN Aboitiz Power-Magat, Inc. (SNAP-Magat), a joint venture of a local company, Aboitiz Power Corporation (AP), and a Norwegian firm SN Power in April 2007. SNAP won the bidding in 2006.

== Geography ==
The dam is located within the boundaries of Namillangan, Alfonso Lista, Ifugao and Ramon, Isabela, approximately 350 kilometres (220 mi) north of Metro Manila.

=== Magat River ===
The Magat Dam is on the Magat River, which is the largest tributary of the Cagayan River on the island of Luzon. Cagayan is the longest river in the Philippines. The Magat River has an estimated yearly water discharge of 9,808 million cubic metres and has an approximate crest length of 4,160 metres (13,650 ft) with its headwaters in the province of Nueva Vizcaya and its confluence with the Cagayan River in the province of Isabela.

== Features ==
=== Spillway ===
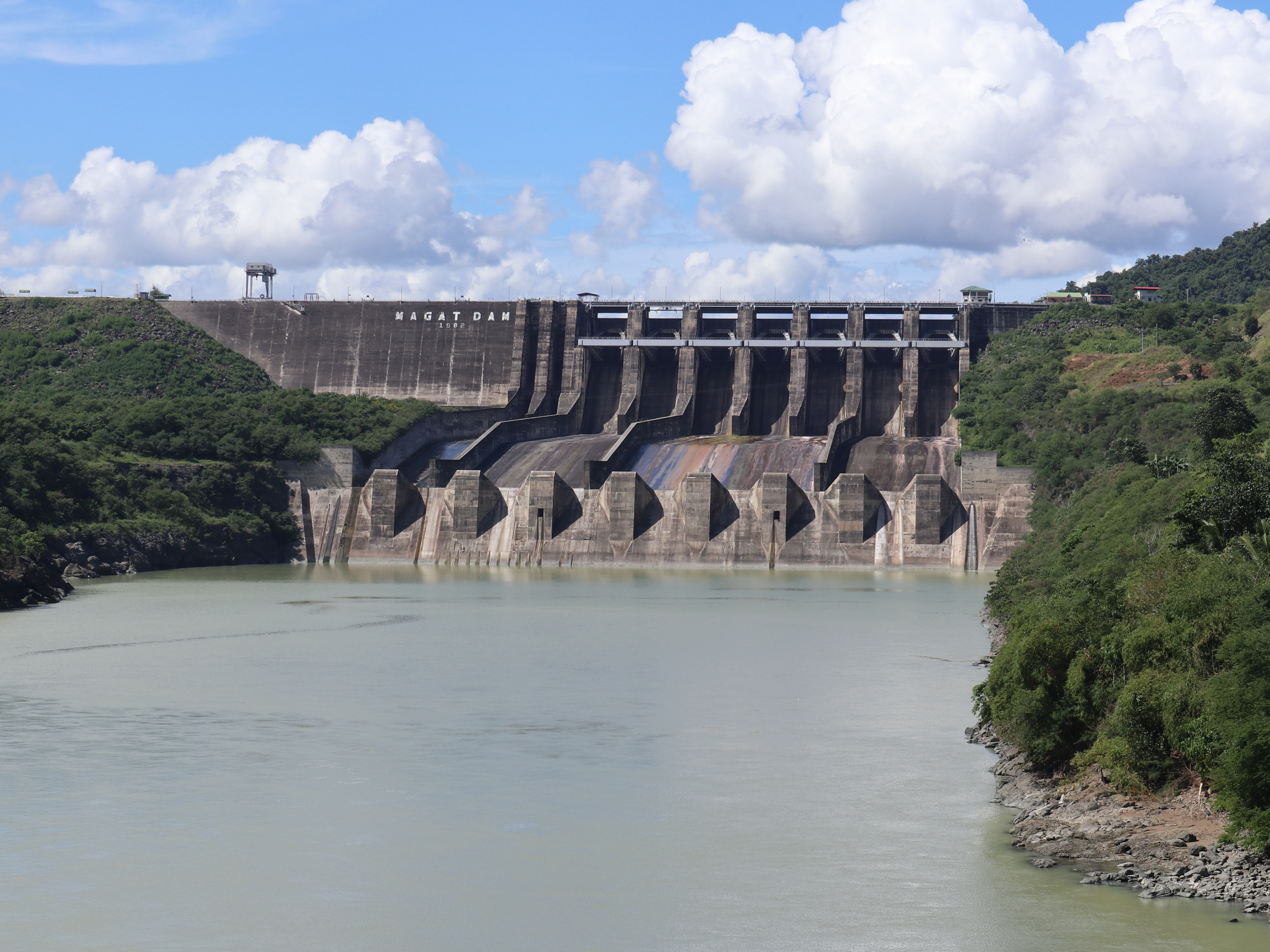
The spillway in 2022

- Length: 500 metres (1,600 ft)
- Width: 164 metres (538 ft)
- Discharge capacity: 30,600 cubic meters
- Radial Gates: 7 sets
- Orifice Gates: 2 sets

=== Diversion tunnels ===
- Number: 2
- Diameter: 2 metres (6.6 ft)
- Average length: 630 metres (2,070 ft)

=== Reservoir ===
- Storage Capacity at Full Supply Level (FSL): 1.08 billion cubic meters
- Elevation at FSL: 193 masl
- Minimum Supply Level: 160 masl
- Maximum Flood Level: 193 masl

=== Power ===
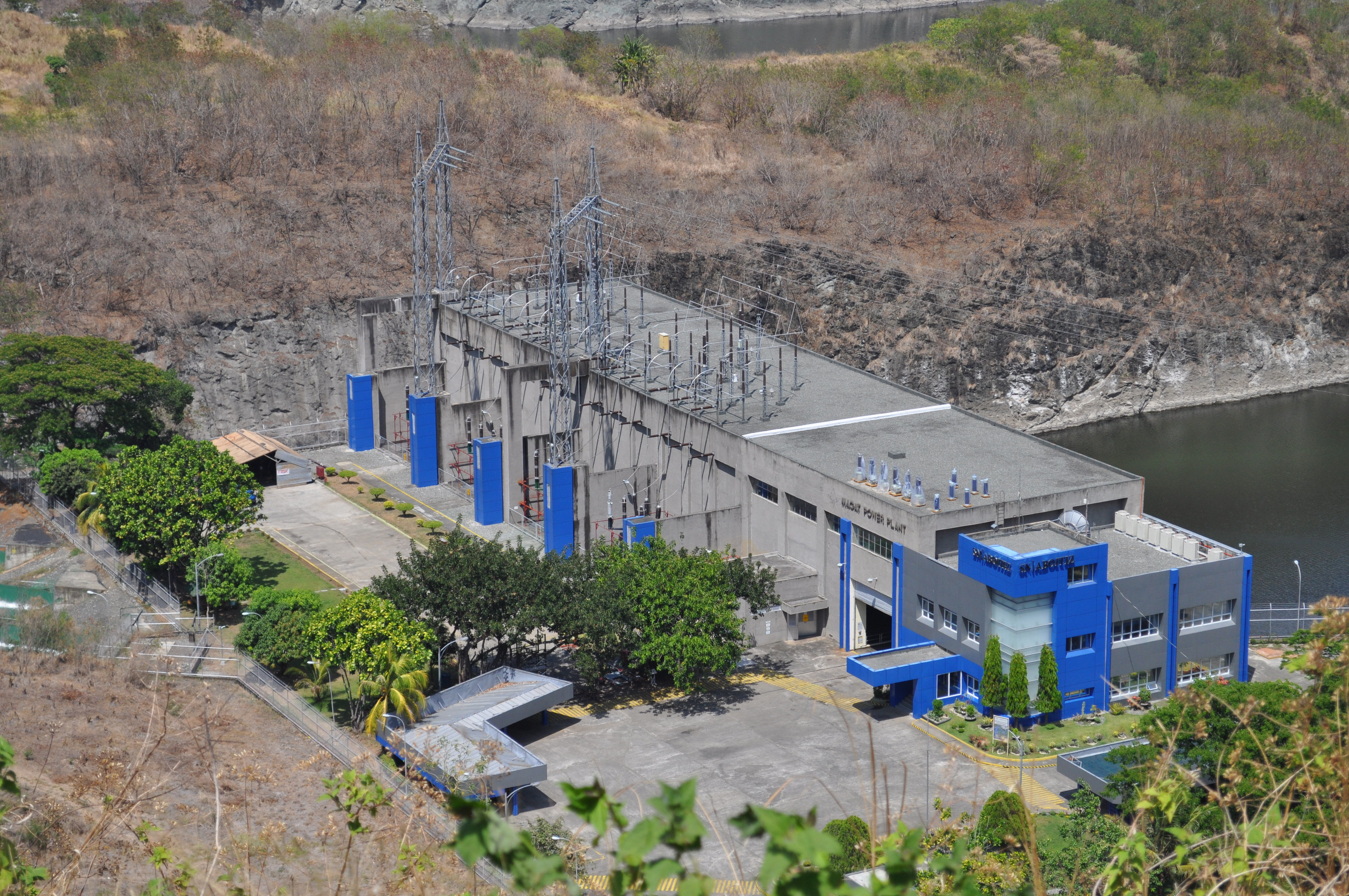
The Magat power plant, located at the base of the dam

- Installed capacity: 360 MegaWatts
- Turbine: 4 units, Francis vertical shaft
- Generator: 4 units x 90 MW, vertical synchronous

=== Access ===
It is connected by an all-weather road to San Mateo–Santiago Road at Oscariz, Ramon, Isabela some 350 kilometres (220 mi) north of Metro Manila.

== Magat Hydro ==
The Magat hydroelectric power plant is a four-unit powerhouse with an installed capacity of 360 megawatts. It is designed to accommodate two more units that will allow it to generate up to 540 megawatts. The hydroelectric plant is a peaking power plant, which means that it only operates when there is a high demand for electricity in the Luzon power grid, to which the plant is connected. It is capable of providing ancillary services for the stability of the grid, and was augmented by a 24 MW battery in 2024.

SN Aboitiz Power-Magat, Inc. completed the half-life refurbishment of the Magat Hydroelectric Power Plant in 2014. Refurbishment began in 2009 and was completed in June 2014. Half-life refurbishment ensures that the power plant facility remains available throughout its life span.

== Discharge-induced floods ==
In November 2020, Typhoon Vamco (locally known in the Philippines as Typhoon Ulysses) crossed the country, dams from all around Luzon neared their spilling points, forcing them to release large amounts of water into their impounds including Magat Dam. The dam opened all of its 7 gates at 24 metres (79 ft), releasing over 5,037 cubic metres (1,331,000 US gal) of water into the Cagayan River flooding numerous riverside towns. Waters under the Buntun Bridge went up as high as 13 metres (43 ft), flooding the nearby barangays up to the roofs of houses. Prior to the flooding, the National Irrigation Administration (NIA) said Sunday it had already warned residents of Cagayan and Isabela of Magat Dam's water release two days prior to Typhoon Ulysses' landfall on November 11. As a result of the catastrophe, the NIA said that it will review its protocols regarding the release of water in Magat Dam and improve its watershed.

== See also ==
- Water supply and sanitation in the Philippines
- Energy in the Philippines
