= Our Lady of Atocha =

Medieval icon of the Virgin Mary in Madrid, Spain

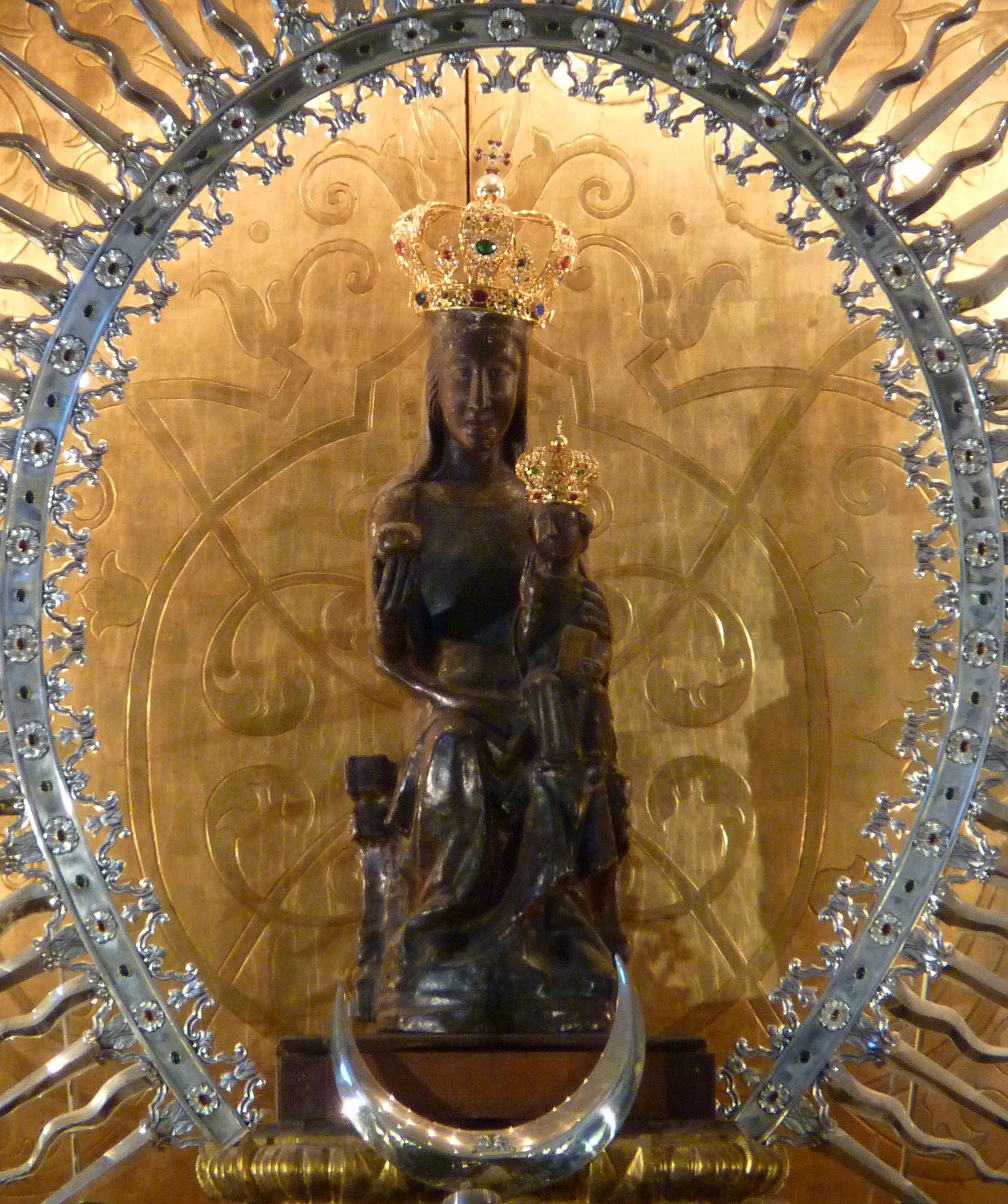
- Pictured in 2009
- Location: Madrid, Spain
- Date: First Sunday in October
- Type: Marian art
- Approval: Pope Pius XI (1930)
- Shrine: Royal Basilica of Our Lady of Atocha
- Patronage: Spanish royal family

Our Lady of Atocha or Virgin of Atocha (Spanish: Nuestra Señora de Atocha or Virgen de Atocha), is a title of the Virgin Mary, whose image is housed in the Royal Basilica of Our Lady of Atocha in Madrid, Spain.

She is the oldest patron of the city of Madrid. Since the 16th century, she has been regarded as the patron and protector of Spanish monarch and the royal family.

== History ==
The name Atocha appears to derive from the term atochal, which means “field of esparto grass” (in fact, the words “atocha” and “esparto” are synonyms).

Legend has it that the sculpture was created by Nicodemus with the assistance of Saint Luke and was brought from Antioch to Spain by the disciples of Saint Peter. The earliest reference dates from the 7th century, by Saint Ildefonsus, in which it is presumed that the image to which he refers—and to whom he prayed—is the Virgin of Atocha.

She is credited with numerous miracles, such as a Christian victory over the Muslims who occupied Madrid in the 8th century when a Christian soldier prayed to her; other miracles recorded in the 13th-century Cantigas de Santa Maria; the lifting of a plague in 1580 when she was carried in procession; following a major fire in the city in 1631 and Queen Isabella II attributed a miracle to it after surviving an assassination attempt in 1852 while visiting the basilica.

In 1083, Alfonso VI had entrusted the royal standard to the Virgin following the conquest of Madrid. Since the 16th century, Our Lady of Atocha is the patron and protector of Spanish monarch and the royal family ever since Emperor Charles I thanked the image for victory in the battles of Pavia, Tunis and Algiers. Subsequent kings, such as Philip II, organised a Te Deum following the victory at Lepanto, and Philip VI proclaimed her “Protector of Spain, of the entire New World, of its fleets and galleons, of the Arms of this Monarchy, and Principal and Most Ancient Patron of this Imperial City of Madrid”. A tradition was also established whereby the kings of Spain would present their children before the image of the Virgin; the most recent examples being Leonor, Princess of Asturias and Infanta Sofía.

Philip IV awarded her the Order of the Golden Fleece, the country's most distinguished honour, and Ferdinand VII awarded her the Order of Charles III after he was released by Napoleon in France; it was this very necklace that was placed around Leonor's neck on the day she came of age in 2023.

King Alfonso XII and Mercedes of Orléans were married in the basilica before the statue, and Felipe VI and Letizia tossed the bridal bouquet there after their wedding in 2004.

She was canonically crowned in 1930.

== Icon ==
The carving is small, made of dark wood. The Virgin is seated on a backless throne, holding a child to whom she offers an apple, while the child Jesus has his right hand raised in a gesture of blessing. It is the city's oldest image.

She is venerated by the Dominican friars in the basilica of Royal Basilica of Our Lady of Atocha. The image survived the destruction of the basilica by Napoleon's troops in the 19th century, when was hidden by the friars, and by Republican militiamen who assaulted the basilica in July 1936 during the firsts days of the Spanish Civil War.
