= Magat River =

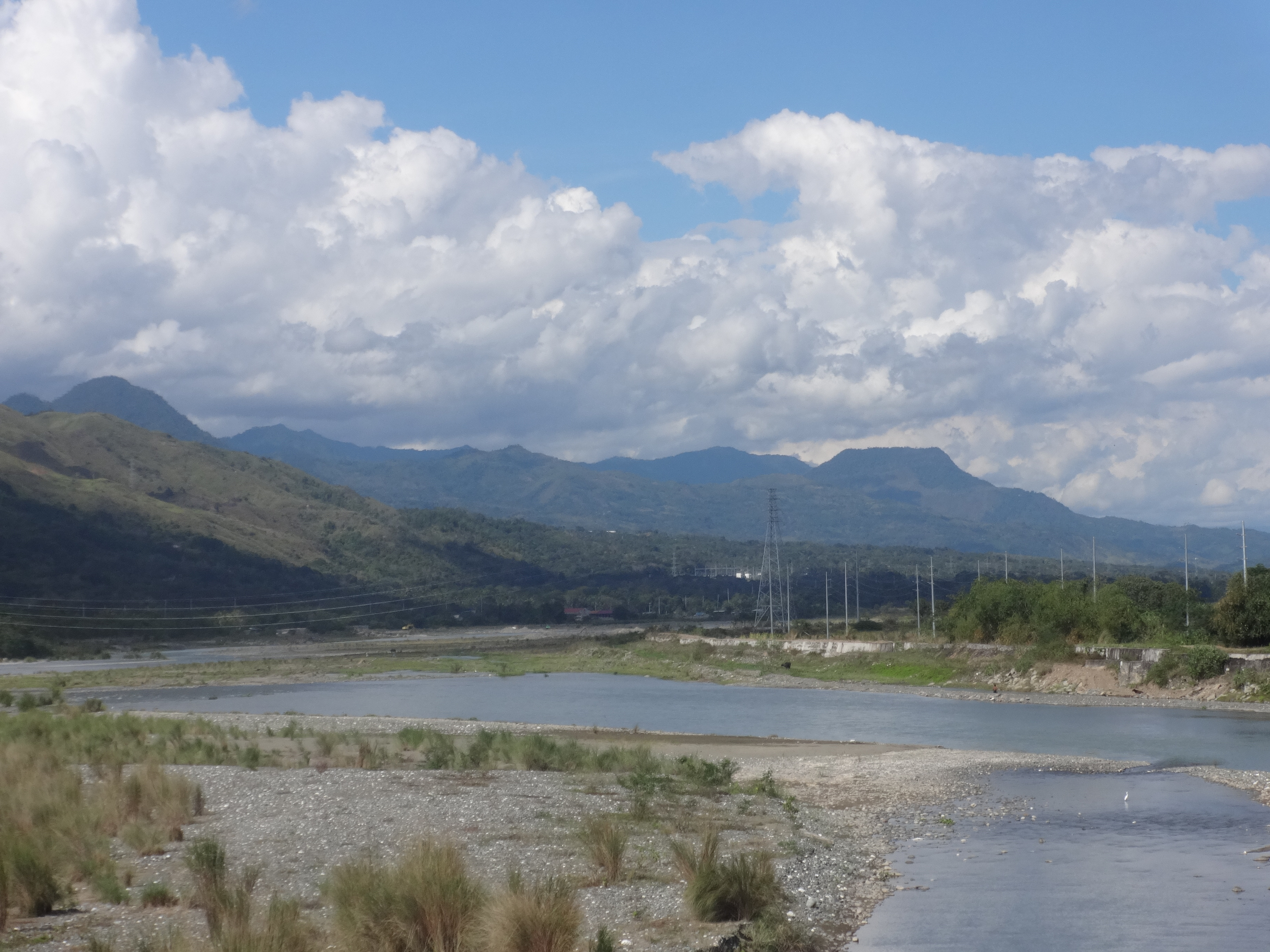
- The river in Bambang, Nueva Vizcaya in 2020

- Magat River mouth Magat River (Philippines)
- Native name: Ilog ng Magat (Tagalog)

Location
- Country: Philippines
- Region: Cagayan Valley
- Province: Nueva Vizcaya; Isabela

Physical characteristics
- Source: Confluence of the Santa Fe and Marang Rivers
  - location: Aritao, Nueva Vizcaya, Cordillera Central Mountains
- Mouth: Confluence of Magat River-Cagayan River
  - location: Gamu, Isabela
  - coordinates: 17°02′27″N 121°49′43″E
  - elevation: 26 ft (7.9 m)
- Length: 226 km (140 mi)
- Basin size: 5,200 km^{2} (2,000 sq mi)
- Discharge
  - location: Cagayan River
  - average: 540 m^{3}/s (19,000 cu ft/s)

Basin features
- Progression: Magat–Cagayan

The Magat River is a river in the Philippine island of Luzon with a total length of 226 kilometres (140 mi). It originates in the Nueva Vizcaya municipality of Aritao, where the Santa Fe River joins the Marang. It is the largest tributary of the Cagayan River by discharge volume of water, with an estimated drainage area of 5,200 square kilometres (2,000 sq mi), roughly twenty percent of the total drainage area of the Cagayan River.

== Tributaries ==
The following are the tributaries of the Magat River by length:

- Alimit River – 99.4 km (61.8 mi)
- Matuno River – 84.7 km (52.6 mi)
- Ibulao River – 78 km (48 mi)
- Taotao River – 61.1 km (38.0 mi)
- Santa Cruz River – 54.8 km (34.1 mi)
- Padol River – 38.5 km (23.9 mi)
- Lamut River – 38 km (24 mi)
- Santa Fe River – 33.6 km (20.9 mi)
- Benay River – 30.1 km (18.7 mi)
- Marang River – 28.4 km (17.6 mi)
- Manga River – 28.3 km (17.6 mi)
- Balasig River – 21.4 km (13.3 mi)

== Magat River Integrated Irrigation System ==
The Magat River Integrated Irrigation System Project, started by the National Irrigation Administration in the 1960s, is one of the Philippine's largest irrigation projects with hydroelectric power generation capacity. Its total cost amounted to US$500 million.

The project is made up of the Magat reservoir, three diversion dams, a large number of irrigation canals and three pumping stations to supply irrigation water for an area of about 97,400 hectares (974 km^{2}). It is also includes hydroelectric power plants; 360 megawatts (480,000 hp) at Magat reservoir, 6,000 kilowatts (8,000 hp) at Baligatan and 2,500 kilowatts (3,400 hp) Magat mini-hydroelectric power plants in Maris main canal.

== See also ==
- List of rivers of the Philippines
