= Alicia, Isabela =

Municipality in Isabela, Philippines

Alicia Angadanan Viejo
- Municipality
- Municipality of Alicia
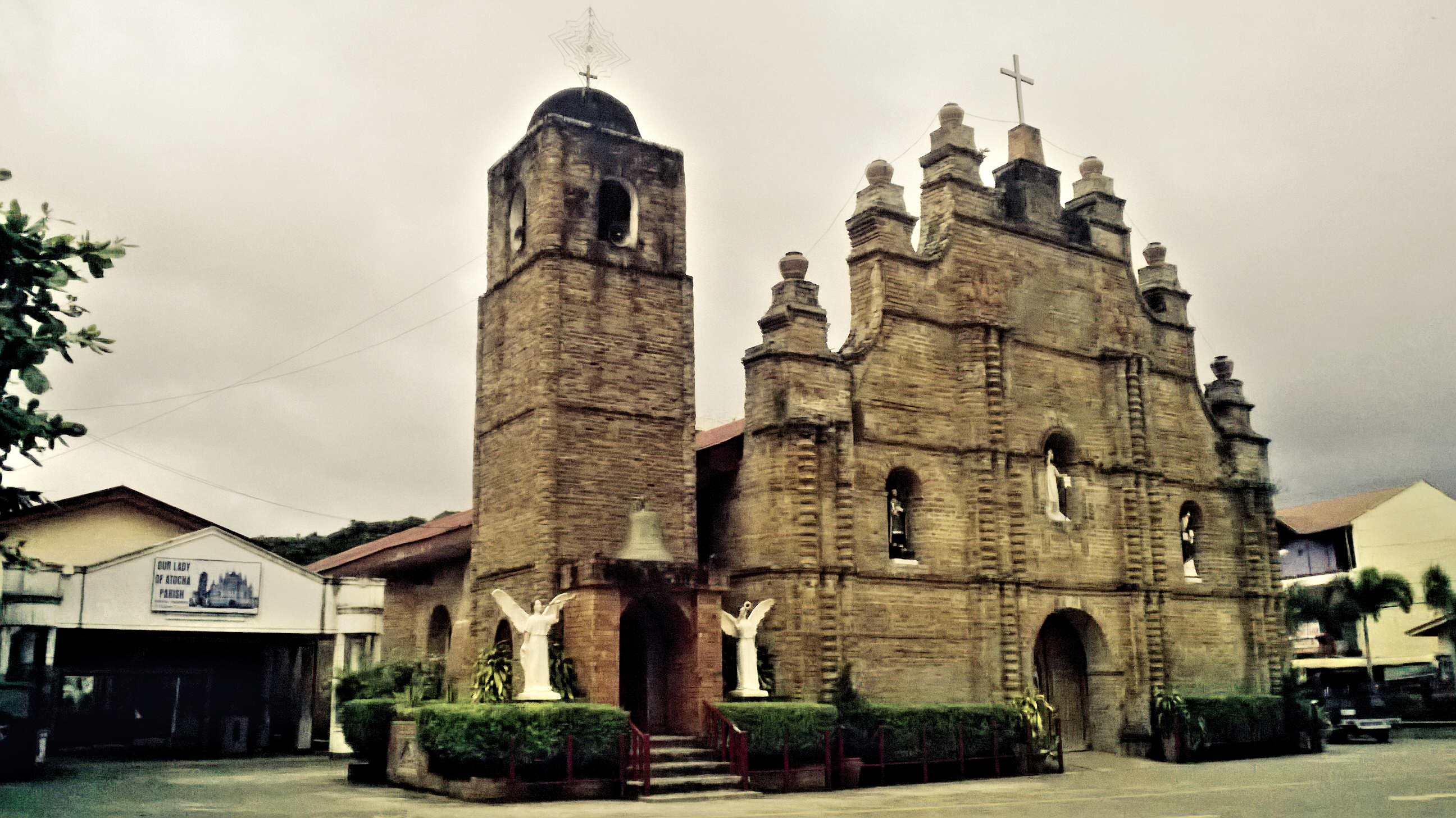
- Our Lady of Atocha Church

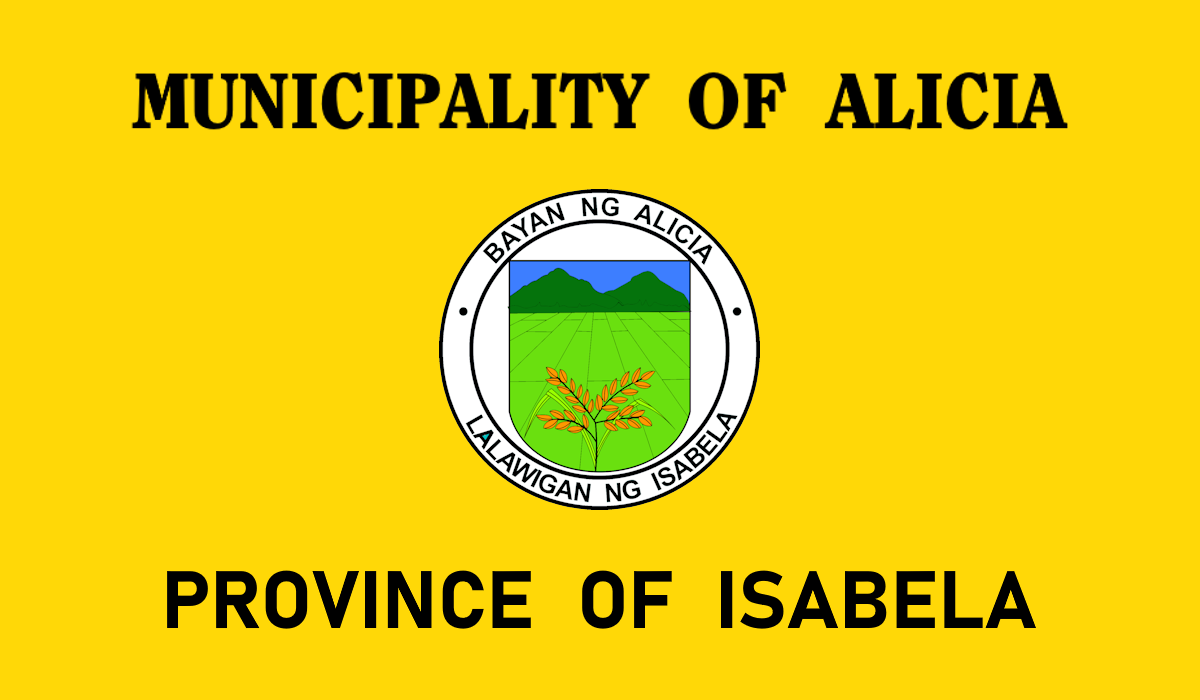
- Flag Seal

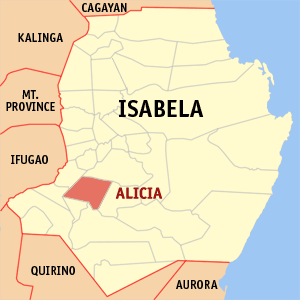
- Map of Isabela with Alicia highlighted
- Interactive map of Alicia
- Location within the Philippines
- Coordinates: 16°46′43″N 121°41′50″E
- Country: Philippines
- Region: Cagayan Valley
- Province: Isabela
- District: 3rd district
- Founded: September 28, 1949
- Named for: Alicia Syquia Quirino
- Barangays: 34 (see Barangays)

Government
  - Type: Sangguniang Bayan
  - Mayor: Joel Amos P. Alejandro
  - Vice Mayor: Andy Bonn B. Velasco
  - Representative: Ian Paul L. Dy
  - Municipal Council: Members: Mila L. Paguila; Jason Manuel P. Alejandro Jr.; Rom-Mikhail E. Go; Gayzle S. Reyes; Jonathan B. Valiente; Christian Hezron A. Mendoza; Victon G. Bumatay; Dandrige Jayson S. Co
  - Electorate: 50,123 voters (2025)

Area
  - Total: 154.10 km^{2} (59.50 sq mi)
- Elevation: 68 m (223 ft)
- Highest elevation: 88 m (289 ft)
- Lowest elevation: 46 m (151 ft)

Population (2024 census)
  - Total: 74,699
  - Density: 484.74/km^{2} (1,255.5/sq mi)
  - Households: 19,564

Economy
  - Income class: 1st municipal income class
  - Poverty incidence: 11.52% (2023)
  - Revenue: ₱ 362.3 million (2024)
  - Assets: ₱ 910.1 million (2024)
  - Expenditure: ₱ 337 million (2024)
  - Liabilities: ₱ 425.7 million (2024)

Service provider
  - Electricity: Isabela 1 Electric Cooperative (ISELCO 1)
- Time zone: UTC+8 (PST)
- ZIP code: 3306
- PSGC: 0203101000
- IDD : area code: +63 (0)78
- Native languages: Ilocano; Gaddang; Tagalog
- Website: alicia-isabela.gov.ph

Alicia, officially the Municipality of Alicia (Ilocano: Ili ti Alicia; Tagalog: Bayan ng Alicia; formerly known as Angadanan Viejo), is a municipality in the province of Isabela, Philippines. According to the 2024 census, it has a population of 74,699 people.

It is known for the Pagay Festival Balitok Ti Alicia and its famous historical landmark, the Our Lady of Atocha Church completed and inaugurated in 1849 which was officially declared by the Philippine Department of Tourism as a national religious tourist destination in the Philippines.

== Etymology ==
When President Elpidio Quirino signed Executive Order No. 268 on 28 September 1949, Old Angadanan was formally created and renamed Alicia after his late wife, Doña Alicia Syquía Quirino. Along with three of their children (except Tomás, a soldier, and Victoria, who later became First Lady for her father), Doña Alicia was one of many civilians massacred by Japanese occupiers on 9 February 1945 during the Battle of Manila.

== History ==
Alicia was the second site of the town of Angadanan, which was initially founded in the mid-18th century as a settlement in present-day Nueva Vizcaya, between the towns of Bagabag and Bayombong. The town took its name from the nearby Angaranan Creek. In 1776, the Spaniards decided to move the settlement further north to Alicia's present location along the Ganano river, a tributary of the Cagayan River. In the 19th century, the Spaniards decided to move Angadanan again 6 km (3.7 mi) further east along the Cagayan River to facilitate better transportation links and to secure the town from repeated raids by the Igorots and Gaddangs. The second site was subsequently known as Angadanan Viejo (Old Angadanan) to distinguish it from its third site called Angadanan Nuevo (New Angadanan), to which the former was a part of until Angadanan Viejo was converted into the separate municipality of Alicia in 1949. Part of the reason for the separation was that Alicia lay alongside the national highway network, which led to a more flourishing economy than its mother settlement.

Both the second and third Angadanans were part of the Cagayan Valley province. The entire Cagayan Valley was one large province which the Spaniards called La Provincia del Valle de Cagayan, but divided into two new provinces in 1839 by the Spanish conquistadors. One retained the old name Cagayan which comprised all towns from Aparri to Tumauini; while a new province of Nueva Vizcaya was created composed of all towns from Ilagan to the Caraballo del Sur.

A Royal Decree was created on 1 May 1856 creating Isabela de Luzon to distinguish it from other Isabelas in the Philippines, to which both Angadanans were added. It was placed under the jurisdiction of a governor with the capital seat at Ilagan, where it remains at the present.

== Geography ==
Alicia has a total land area of 15,410 hectares. 71% of the total land area is an agricultural land which makes Alicia primarily an agricultural municipality best suited for the intensive production of rice and corn. Farming is its major livelihood and rice its major product and resource.

The municipality is located in an area of predominantly flat and fertile land in the Cagayan Valley that is surrounded by the Caraballo Mountains to the south, the Great Sierra Madre to the east, and the Cordillera Mountain Range to the west. It is the largest rice producer in the entire Cagayan Valley and has the largest irrigated rice field in the whole Region II of the Philippines.

Alicia is 53.25 kilometres (33.09 mi) from the provincial capital Ilagan and 383.62 kilometres (238.37 mi) from the capital Manila.

=== Barangays ===
Alicia is politically subdivided into 34 barangays. Each barangay consists of puroks while some have sitios.

There are seven barangays that are currently considered urban (highlighted in bold).

- Amistad
- **Antonino (Poblacion)**
- Apanay
- **Aurora**
- Bagnos
- Bagong Sikat
- Bantug-Petines
- Bonifacio
- **Burgos**
- **Calaocan (Poblacion)**
- Callao
- Dagupan
- Inanama
- Linglingay
- M.H. del Pilar
- Mabini
- **Magsaysay (Poblacion)**
- Mataas na Kahoy
- **Paddad**
- Rizal
- Rizaluna
- Salvacion
- San Antonio (Poblacion)
- San Fernando
- San Francisco
- San Juan
- San Pablo
- San Pedro
- Santa Cruz
- Santa Maria
- Santo Domingo
- Santo Tomas
- **Victoria**
- Zamora

=== Climate ===
Climate data for Alicia, Isabela
Month	Jan	Feb	Mar	Apr	May	Jun	Jul	Aug	Sep	Oct	Nov	Dec	Year
Mean daily maximum °C (°F)	29 (84)	30 (86)	32 (90)	35 (95)	35 (95)	35 (95)	34 (93)	33 (91)	32 (90)	31 (88)	30 (86)	28 (82)	32 (90)
Mean daily minimum °C (°F)	19 (66)	20 (68)	21 (70)	23 (73)	23 (73)	24 (75)	23 (73)	23 (73)	23 (73)	22 (72)	21 (70)	20 (68)	22 (71)
Average precipitation mm (inches)	31.2 (1.23)	23 (0.9)	27.7 (1.09)	28.1 (1.11)	113.5 (4.47)	141.4 (5.57)	176.4 (6.94)	236.6 (9.31)	224.9 (8.85)	247.7 (9.75)	222.9 (8.78)	178 (7.0)	1,651.4 (65)
Average rainy days	10	6	5	5	13	12	15	15	15	17	16	15	144
Source: World Weather Online

== Demographics ==
Population census of Alicia

Year	Pop.	±% p.a.
1960	14,281	—
1970	24,220	+5.42%
1975	28,904	+3.61%
1980	36,634	+4.85%
1990	47,674	+2.67%
1995	52,666	+1.88%

Year	Pop.	±% p.a.
2000	57,178	+1.78%
2007	61,447	+1.00%
2010	64,687	+1.89%
2015	71,504	+1.93%
2020	73,874	+0.69%
2024	74,699	+0.27%

Source: Philippine Statistics Authority

In the 2024 census, the population of Alicia was 74,699 people, with a density of 480 inhabitants per square kilometre or 1,200 inhabitants per square mile.

=== Language ===
The population is a combination of different ethnic group dominated by Ilocano speaking people which make Ilocano the common language used in the municipality. English, being one of the official languages is used primarily in communication for government publications, local newsprints, road signs, commercial signs and in doing official business transactions. Tagalog, another official language and is also considered the national language is used as verbal communication channel between residents.

== Economy ==
Poverty incidence of Alicia

Source: Philippine Statistics Authority

Alicia, as a suburb of a progressive city, Cauayan, Isabela, is also showing signs of progress. Various banking institutions like Landbank of the Philippines, Security Bank, etc. are already present in Alicia.

== Tourism ==
=== Our Lady of Atocha Church ===
The Our Lady of Atocha Church in Alicia is known for having an old Spanish church architecture. It is one of the best churches to visit for a pilgrimage in the Philippines during the Holy Week. The church was declared by the Philippine Department of Tourism as one of the national religious tourist attractions in the Philippines.

The structure of the church was original built by the Spaniards in the 18th century, but not finished. Passing by Angadanan town on 12 February 1805, Fr. Manuel Mora, OP wrote that "Angadanan has a convent of bricks, though not totally finished. Its church is timber, wood, and bamboo. The number of inhabitants is 791." The church and convent as seen today in the town of Alicia, beautiful and antique, was built by Fr. Tomas Calderon, OP and inaugurated in 1849, with Fr. Francisco Gainza, OP, then vicar of Carig (now Santiago City). The church was dedicated to the Nuestra Señora de Atocha, more popularly known today as Our Lady of Atocha. The church is known for its antique Castilian architectural design and can be found along the Maharlika Highway and is accessible by land transport.

The Catholic churches in Alicia, Gamu, and Cauayan, are examples of what is called as the "Cagayan Style" of Spanish churches that was inspired by the Tuguegarao church.

== Government ==
=== Local government ===
As a municipality in the Province of Isabela, government officials in the provincial level are voted by the town. The provincial government has political jurisdiction over most local transactions of the municipal government.

The municipality of Alicia is governed by a mayor, designated as its local chief executive, and by a municipal council as its legislative body in accordance with the Local Government Code. The mayor, vice mayor, and the municipal councilors are elected directly by the people through an election held every three years.

Barangays are also headed by elected officials: Barangay Captain, Barangay Council, whose members are called Barangay Councilors. The barangays have SK federation which represents the barangay, headed by SK chairperson and whose members are called SK councilors. All officials are also elected every three years.

=== Elected officials ===
The first municipal mayor of the town was Glicerio Acosta who was appointed to office by the President of the Philippines upon the creation of Alicia as a municipality in 1949. The mayor and other elective officials are restricted to three consecutive terms, totaling nine years, although a mayor can be elected again after an interruption of one term.

Members of the Alicia Municipal Council (2022-2025)
Position	Name
District Representative (3rd Legislative District of the Province of Isabela)	Ian Paul L. Dy
Chief Executive of the Municipality of Alicia	Mayor Joel Amos P. Alejandro
Presiding Officer of the Municipal Council of Alicia	Vice Mayor Andy Bonn B. Velasco
Councilors of the Municipality of Alicia	Miko Go
Councilors of the Municipality of Alicia	Mila L. Paguila
Councilors of the Municipality of Alicia	Gayzle Reyes
Councilors of the Municipality of Alicia	Dandrige Jayson Co
Councilors of the Municipality of Alicia	Christian Hezron Mendoza
Councilors of the Municipality of Alicia	Joel Felipe P. Alejandro
Councilors of the Municipality of Alicia	Victon G. Bumatay
Councilors of the Municipality of Alicia	Maxell Mapili

=== Congress representation ===
Alicia, belonging to the third legislative district of the province of Isabela, currently represented by Hon. Ian Paul L. Dy.

== Education ==
The Schools Division of Isabela governs the town's public education system. The division office is a field office of the DepEd in Cagayan Valley region. The office governs the public and private elementary and public and private high schools throughout the municipality. Alicia has two school districts: Alicia North, and Alicia South.

=== Primary and elementary schools ===
- Adventist School Alicia Campus
- Alicia North Central School
- Alicia South Central School
- Alicia West Central School
- Amistad Elementary School
- Apanay Public School
- Aurora Elementary School
- Ay Kun School
- Bagnos Elementary School
- Bagong Sikat Elementary School
- Bantug Petines Elementary School
- Bonifacio Elementary School
- Burgos Elementary School
- Callao Elementary School
- Dagupan Elementary School
- Faith Christian Academy
- Inanama Elementary School
- Linglingay Elementary School
- Mabini Elementary School
- Mataas na Kahoy Elementary School
- MH del Pilar Elementary School
- Northeast Luzon Adventist College
- Odizee School of Achievers
- Paddad Elementary School
- Rizal Elementary School
- Rizaluna Elementary School
- Salvacion Elementary School
- San Antonio Elementary School
- San Fernando Elementary School
- San Francisco Elementary School
- San Juan Elementary School
- San Pablo Elementary School
- San Pedro Elementary School
- Santa Cruz Elementary School
- Santa Maria Elementary School
- Santo Domingo Elementary School
- Santo Tomas Elementary School
- School of Our Lady of Atocha
- St. Francis School Foundation
- St. John Adaptive Montessori School
- Top Achievers Private School
- Victoria Elementary School
- Wizard Elementary School
- Zamora Elementary School

=== Secondary schools ===
- Alicia National High School
- Alicia Vocational School
- Dalton Academy
- Northeast Luzon Adventist College
- Odizee School of Achievers
- Palayan Region High School
- Rizal Region National High School, Alicia, Isabela
- School of Our Lady of Atocha
- Taps Alicia Private School
- Xavier's School for Gifted Youngsters

=== Higher educational institutions ===
Alicia has two higher educational institutions that cater to the people of the municipality and other neighboring municipalities and provinces. Alicia is also noted for having the most high-tech school in the region. These are governed by CHED.

- Northeast Luzon Adventist College
- Philippine Normal University- Northern Luzon Campus

== Media ==
- 107.1 TAPS Radio.
