= Ian Paul Dy =

Filipino politician (born 1981)

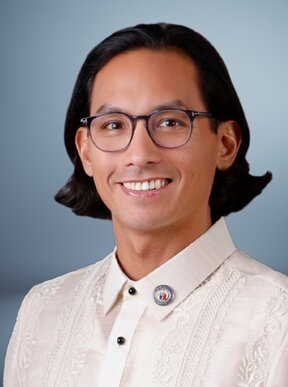
- Official portrait, 2025

Member of the House of Representatives from Isabela’s 3rd District
- Incumbent
- Assumed office June 30, 2019
- Preceded by: Napoleon Dy

Mayor of Alicia, Isabela
- In office June 30, 2013 – June 30, 2019
- Vice Mayor: Joel Amos Alejandro
- Preceded by: Cecilia Claire Reyes
- Succeeded by: Joel Amos Alejandro

Vice Mayor of Alicia, Isabela
- In office June 30, 2010 – June 30, 2013
- Mayor: Cecilia Claire Reyes
- Preceded by: Manuel Alejandro
- Succeeded by: Joel Amos Alejandro

Member of Alicia Municipal Council
- In office June 30, 2007 – June 30, 2010

Personal details
- Born: Ian Paul Laguatan Dy; May 31, 1981 (age 45) Quezon City, Philippines
- Party: Lakas (2009–2012; 2022–present)
- Other political affiliations: NPC (2007–2009; 2012–2022)
- Relatives: Bojie Dy (uncle); Inno Dy (first cousin); Mike Dy III (first cousin)
- Education: Toowoomba Grammar School (secondary)
- Occupation: Politician

Ian Paul Laguatan Dy (born May 31, 1981) is a Filipino politician. He is currently serving as representative of the 3rd District of Isabela in the House of Representatives of the Philippines since 2019. He served as mayor of Alicia, Isabela from 2013 to 2019. He also served as vice mayor of Alicia, Isabela from 2010 to 2013.

== Early life and education ==
Dy was born on May 31, 1981 in Quezon City, to a prominent political family in Isabela. He studied Toowoomba Grammar School for his secondary education.

== Political career ==
=== Alicia Municipal Council ===
Dy entered politics when he was councilor in Alicia, Isabela from 2007 to 2010.

=== Vice Mayor of Alicia, Isabela ===
In 2010, Dy was elected as vice mayor of Alicia, Isabela until 2013.

=== Mayor of Alicia, Isabela ===
In 2013, Dy was elected as mayor of Alicia, Isabela where he served for two terms.

=== House of Representatives ===
In 2019, Dy was elected as representative for third district of Isabela after he succeeded his father.

In 2020, Dy was one of the 70 representatives who voted to permanently deny the renewal of broadcasting franchise of television network ABS-CBN.

== Personal life ==
His father, Napoleon Dy, was also served as representative for third district of Isabela from 2010 to 2019.

== Electoral history ==
Electoral history of Ian Paul Dy
Year	Office	Party	Votes received				Result
Year	Office	Party	Total	%	P.	Swing	Result
2007	Councilor of Alicia, Isabela	NPC	13,719	—N/a	3rd	—N/a	Won
2010	Vice Mayor of Alicia, Isabela	Lakas–Kampi	13,714	—N/a	1st	—N/a	Won
2013	Mayor of Alicia, Isabela	NPC	19,005	—N/a	1st	—N/a	Won
2016	Mayor of Alicia, Isabela	NPC	24,341	—N/a	1st	—N/a	Won
2019	Representative (Isabela–3rd)	NPC	78,477	—N/a	1st	—N/a	Won
2022	Representative (Isabela–3rd)	NPC	113,838	100.00%	1st	—N/a	Unopposed
2025	Representative (Isabela–3rd)	Lakas	118,333	100.00%	1st	—N/a	Unopposed
