= Isabela (province) =

Province in Cagayan Valley (Region II), Philippines

- Province
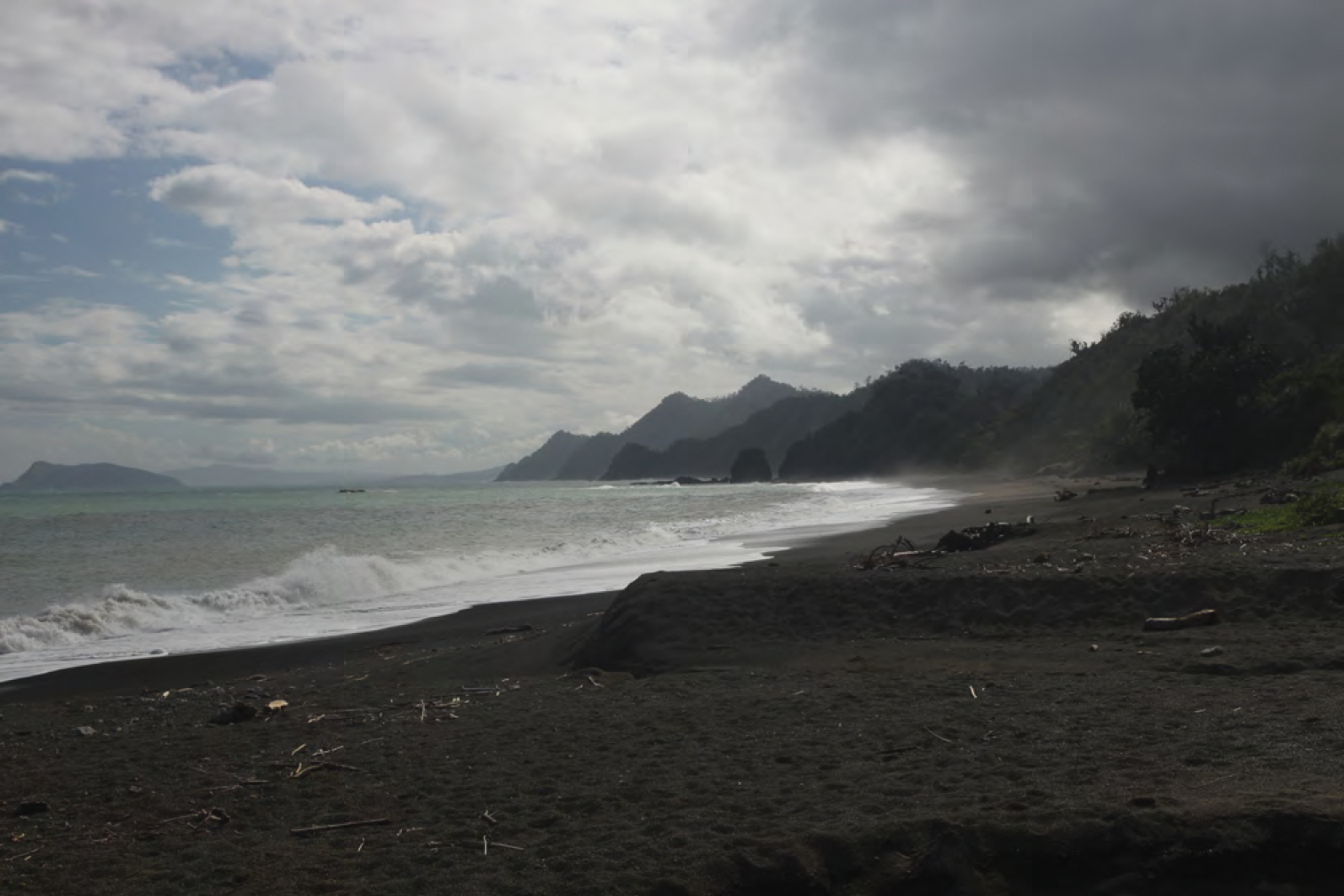
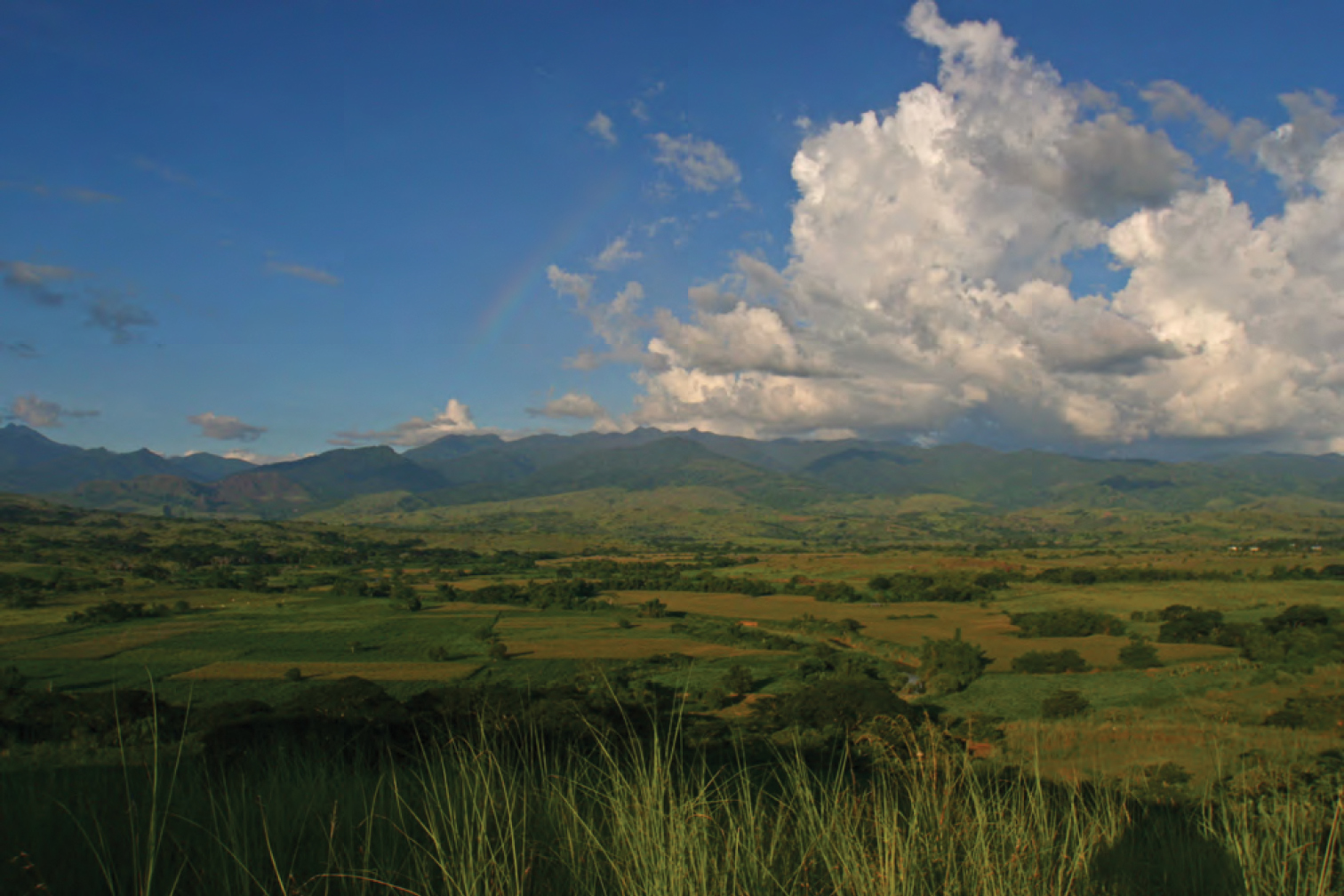
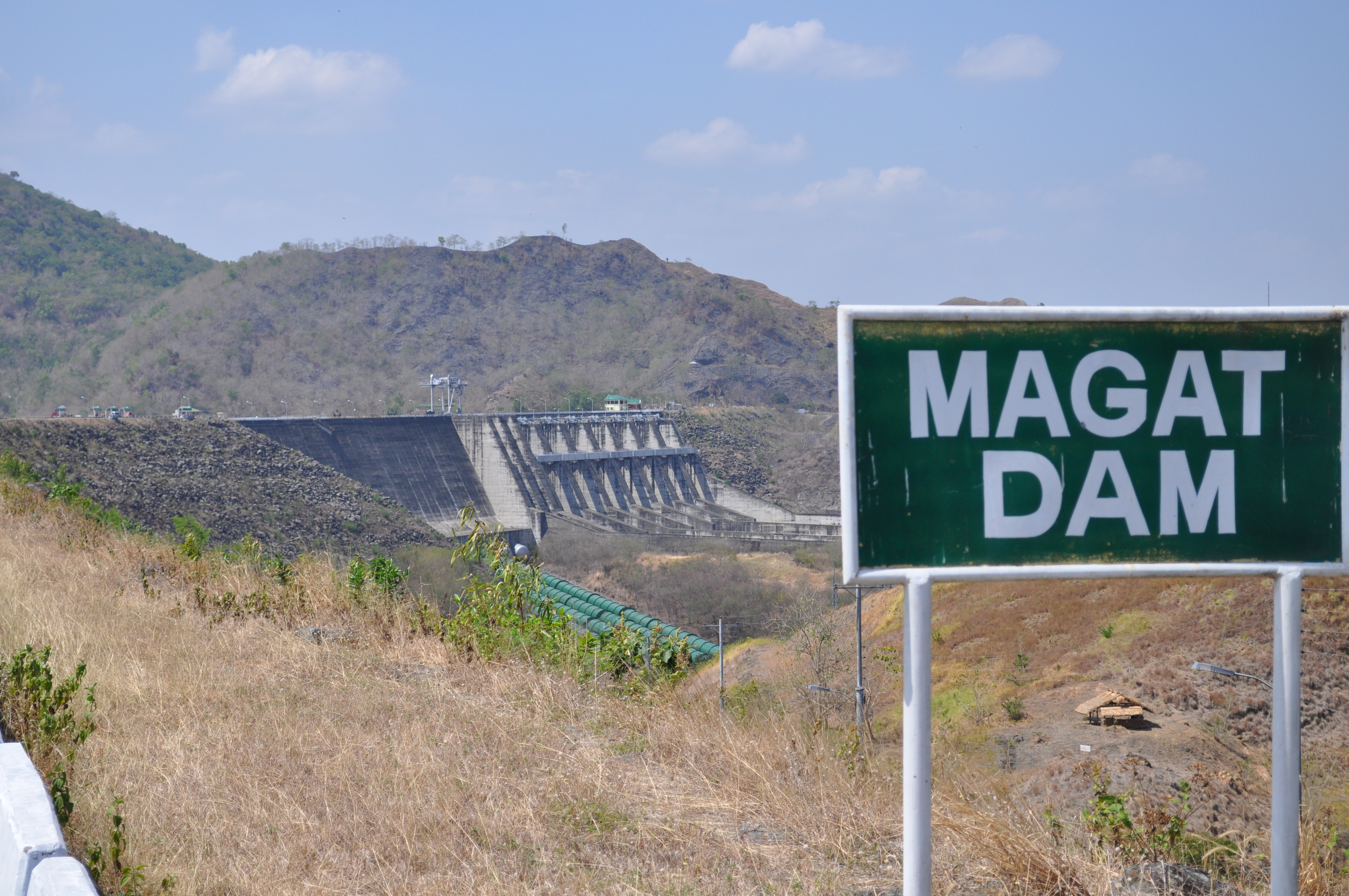
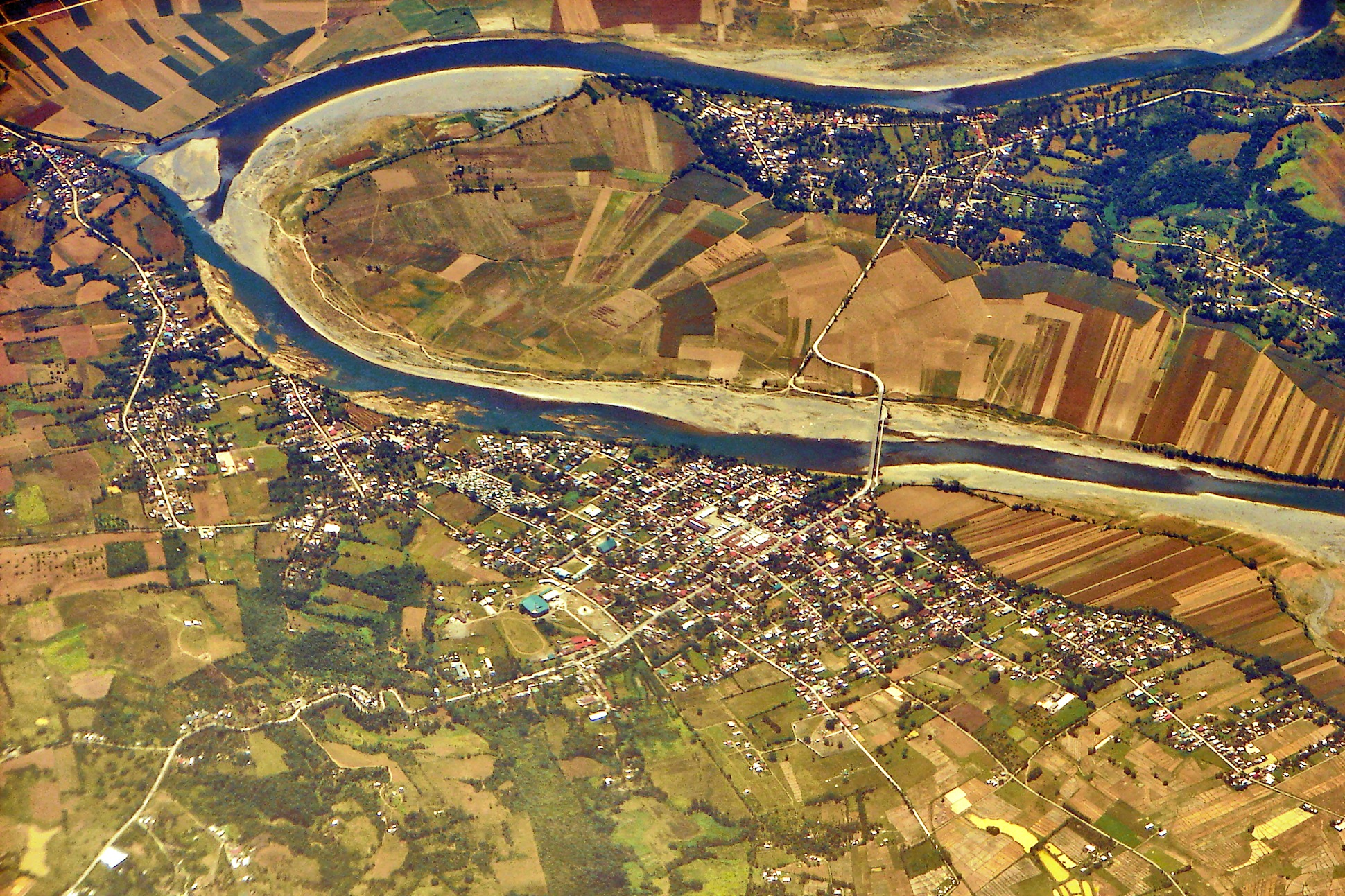
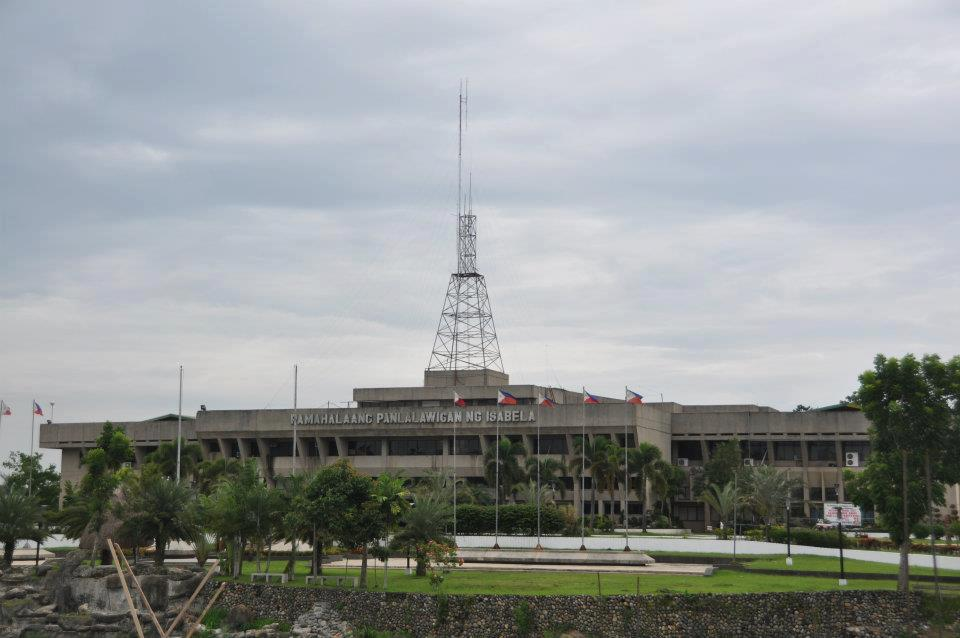
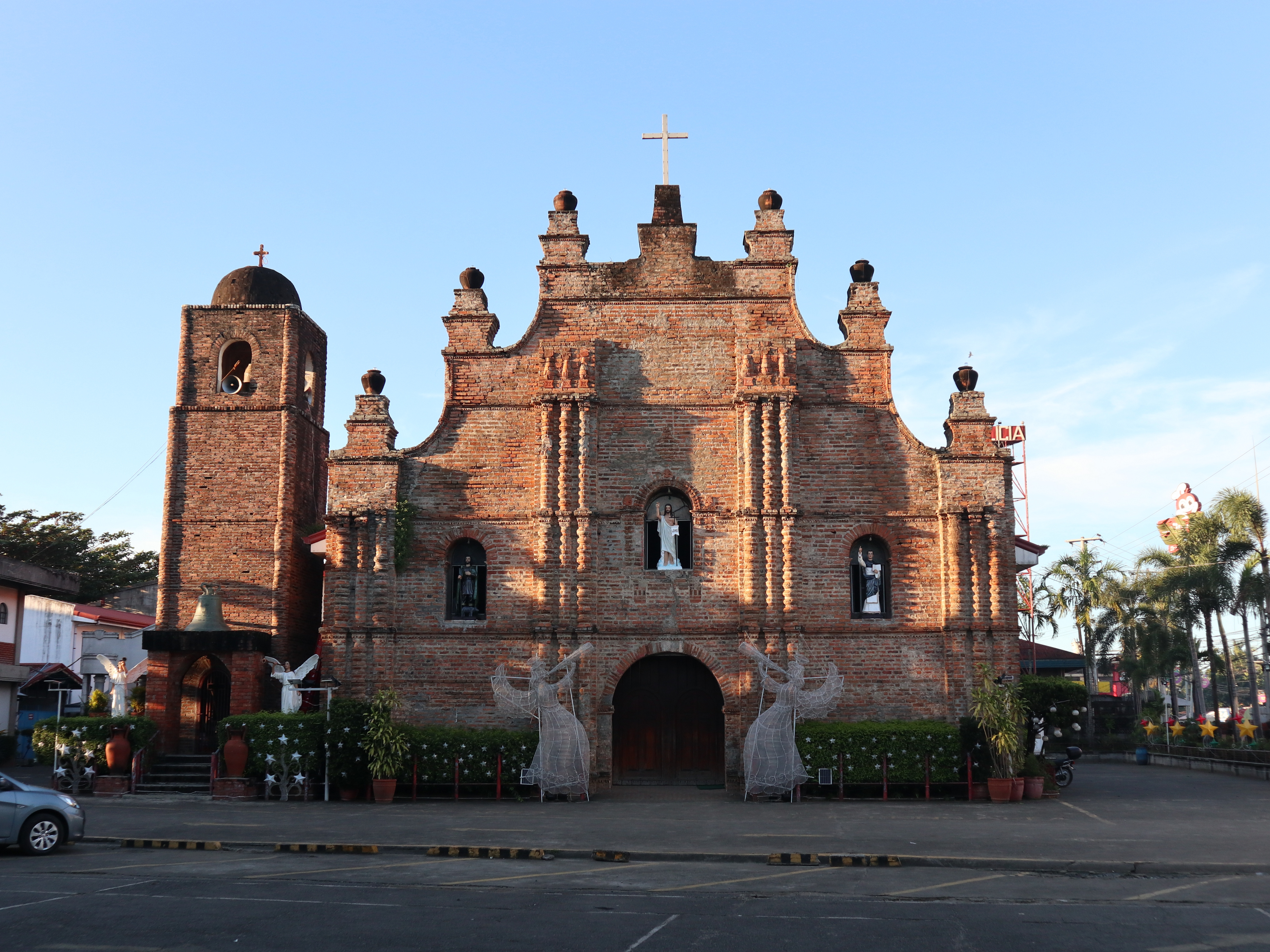
- (from top: left to right) Pacific coast in Dinapigue, Sierra Madre Mountains, Magat Dam, Cagayan River in Jones, Isabela Provincial Capitol and Our Lady of Atocha Church.

- Flag Seal
- Nicknames: Queen Province of the North; Rice Bowl of the North; Top Corn Producer of the Philippines; Sentro ng AGRIkultura
- Location in the Philippines
- Interactive map of Isabela
- Coordinates: 17°N 122°E
- Country: Philippines
- Region: Cagayan Valley
- Founded: May 1, 1856
- Named for: Isabella II of Spain
- Capital and largest city: Ilagan

Government
  - Type: Sangguniang Panlalawigan
  - Governor: Rodolfo T. Albano III (PFP)
  - Vice Governor: Francis Dy (Lakas)
  - Legislature: Isabela Provincial Board
  - Electorate: 1,125,541 voters (2025)

Area
  - Total: 13,102.05 km^{2} (5,058.73 sq mi)
  - Rank: 2nd out of 82
- (includes Santiago)
- Highest elevation (Mount Dos Cuernos): 1,736 m (5,696 ft)

Population (2024 census)
  - Total: 1,733,048
  - Rank: 15th out of 82
  - Density: 132.2730/km^{2} (342.5856/sq mi)
  - Rank: 67th out of 82
  - Households: 422,670
- (Includes Santiago)
- Demonyms: Isabeleño; Isabelino (m/n); Isabeleña (f); Isabelan

Divisions
  - Independent cities: 1: Santiago; **
  - Component cities: 2: Cauayan; Ilagan
  - Municipalities: 34: Alicia; Angadanan; Aurora; Benito Soliven; Burgos; Cabagan; Cabatuan; Cordon; Delfin Albano; Dinapigue; Divilacan; Echague; Gamu; Jones; Luna; Maconacon; Mallig; Naguilian; Palanan; Quezon; Quirino; Ramon; Reina Mercedes; Roxas; San Agustin; San Guillermo; San Isidro; San Manuel; San Mariano; San Mateo; San Pablo; Santa Maria; Santo Tomas; Tumauini
  - Barangays: 1,018; including independent cities: 1,055
  - Districts: Legislative districts of Isabela (shared with Santiago)

Economy
  - Income class: 1st provincial income class
  - Poverty incidence: 8.4% (2023)
  - Revenue: ₱ 6,935 million (2024)
  - Assets: ₱ 20,295 million (2024)
  - Expenditure: ₱ 5,218 million (2024)
  - Liabilities: ₱ 4,559 million (2024)
- Time zone: UTC+8 (PHT)
- PSGC: 023100000
- IDD : area code: +63 (0)78
- ISO 3166 code: PH-ISA
- Spoken languages: Ilocano; Ibanag; Gaddang; Tagalog; Yogad; English
- Website: provinceofisabela.gov.ph
- ** Santiago is an independent-component city.

Isabela, officially the Province of Isabela (Ilocano: Probinsia ti Isabela; Ibanag: Provinsia na Isabela; Tagalog: Lalawigan ng Isabela), is the second largest province in the Philippines by land area located in the Cagayan Valley. Its capital and the largest local government unit is the city of Ilagan. It is bordered by the provinces of Cagayan to the north, Kalinga to the northwest, Mountain Province to the central-west, Ifugao and Nueva Vizcaya to the southwest, Quirino, Aurora and the independent city of Santiago to the south, and the Philippine Sea to the east.

This primarily agricultural province is the rice and corn granary of Luzon with its mix of plains and rolling terrain. In 2012, the province was declared as the country's top producer of corn with 1,209,524 metric tons. Isabela was also declared the second-largest rice producer in the Philippines and the "Queen Province of the North".

The province has four trade centers in the cities of Ilagan, Cauayan, Santiago and the municipality of Roxas. Santiago is considered to have the fastest-growing local economy in the entire Philippines.

== Etymology ==
The province was named during the time that the Philippines was under Spanish control, and named after Isabella II, who was queen regnant of Spain from September 29, 1833, until September 30, 1868, when she was deposed in the Glorious Revolution, and her formal abdication two years later.

== History ==
The province of Isabela used to be a vast rainforest where numerous indigenous ethnolinguistic groups lived. Many of the same ethnic groups still live in the province. Shell midden sites and other archaeological sites throughout the province constitute the material culture of those groups during the classical era.

=== Spanish colonial period ===
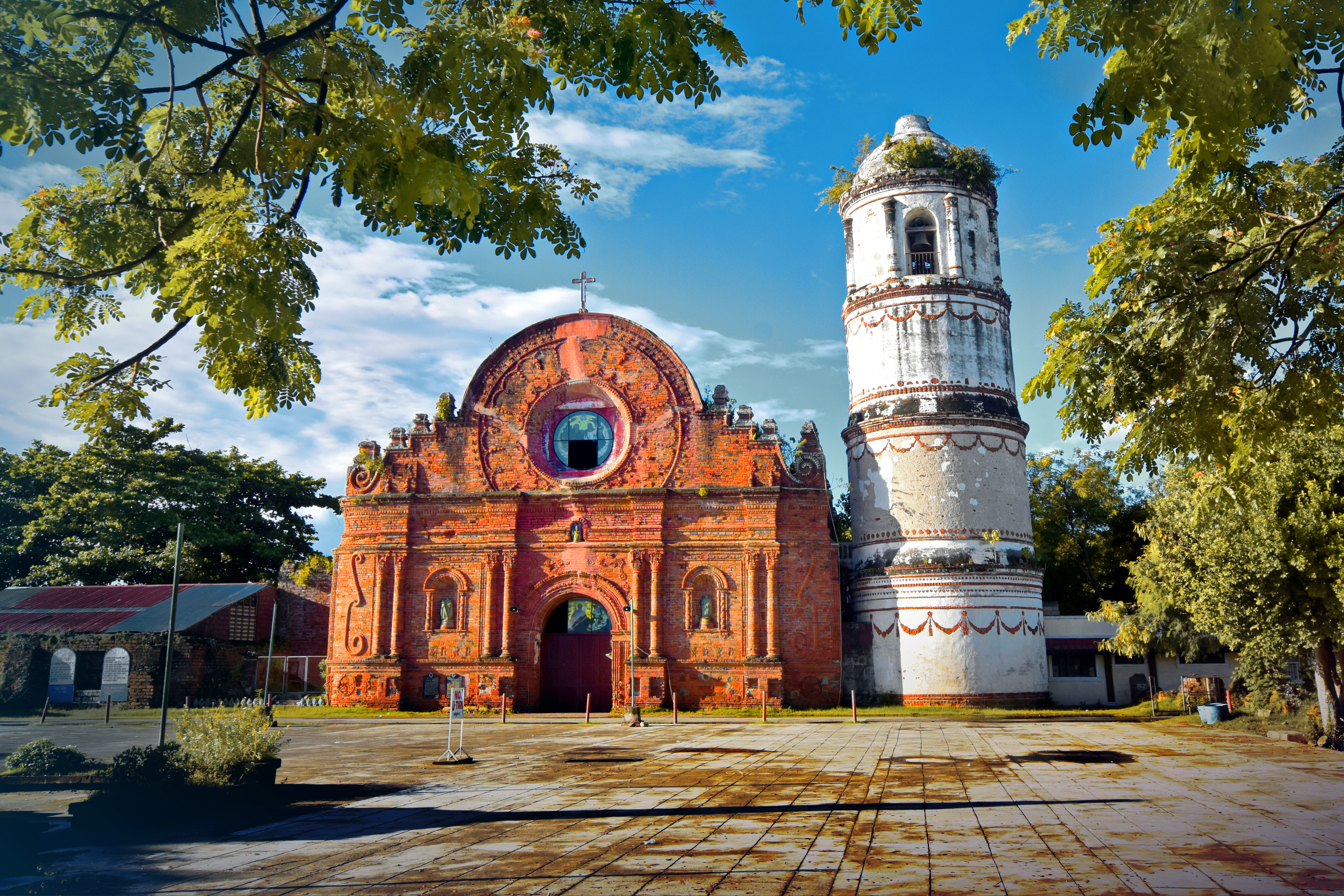
Tumauini Church

During the Spanish era, prior to 1856, the Cagayan Valley was divided into only two provinces: Cagayan and Nueva Vizcaya. The Province of Cagayan at that time consisted of all towns from Tumauini to Aparri in the north. All other towns from Ilagan southward to Aritao composed the Province of the old Nueva Vizcaya. In order to facilitate the work of the Catholic missionaries in the evangelization of the Cagayan Valley, a royal decree was issued on May 1, 1856, creating the Province of Isabela consisting of the towns of Gamu, Old Angadanan (now Alicia), Bindang (now Roxas) and Camarag (now Echague), Carig (now Santiago City) and Palanan, all detached from the Province of Nueva Vizcaya; while Cabagan and Tumauini were taken from the Province of Cagayan. The exception is Palanan, which was established in 1625 by Spanish forces who arrived by ship from the Pacific coastal town of Baler in Tayabas province (now part of Aurora). Thus, Palanan was originally a part of Pampanga, then to Laguna, Tayabas (now Quezon Province; Tayabas became independent from Laguna), and Nueva Ecija, before being transferred to Nueva Vizcaya and finally Isabela. Also, unlike the rest of Cagayan Valley, it was served by Franciscan missionaries from Baler rather than the Dominicans. The population of the town was natively Paranan, then subsequently augmented by local Negritos, migrants from Baler who are Tagalogs and outlaws from Cagayan Valley, with the lingua franca of the settlement being Tagalog as opposed to Ilocano or Ibanag.

The province was placed under the jurisdiction of a governor (Lieutenant Colonel of Cavalry Francisco Contreras y Urtasun) with Ilagan as the capital, where it remains up to present. It was initially called Isabela de Luzón and also Isabela del Norte to differentiate from other places in the Philippines bearing the name of Isabela. The new province was named after Queen Isabella II of Spain. During that time, the Spanish controlled only the areas along the Cagayan River, leaving the Mallig Plants, the Magat River and the Sierra Madre Mountains to Gaddang tribes.

The Atta or Negritos were the first people in valley. They were later moved to the uplands or variably assimilated by the Austronesians, from whom the Ibanags, Itawes, Yogads, Gaddangs, Irayas, Malawegs, and Paranans descended - who actually came from one ethnicity. These are the people found by the Spaniards in the different villages along the rivers all over Cagayan Valley, including present Isabela. The Spaniards rightly judged that these various villagers came from a single racial stock and decided to make the Ibanag language the lingua franca, both civilly and ecclesiastically for the entire people of Cagayan which they called collectively as the Cagayanes which later was transliterated to become Cagayanos.

Various other peoples, mainly the Ilocanos, Pangasinenses, Kapampangans and Tagalogs, as well as Visayans, Moros, Ivatans, and even foreigners like the Chinese, Indians, Arabs, Spaniards and others were further infused to the native Cagayanes to become the modern Cagayano, and Isabeleño in the exact province, that we know today.

During the 1818 Spanish census, Gamu (Isabela Province) had 586 native families living in harmony with 16 Spanish-Filipino families.

=== American colonial era ===
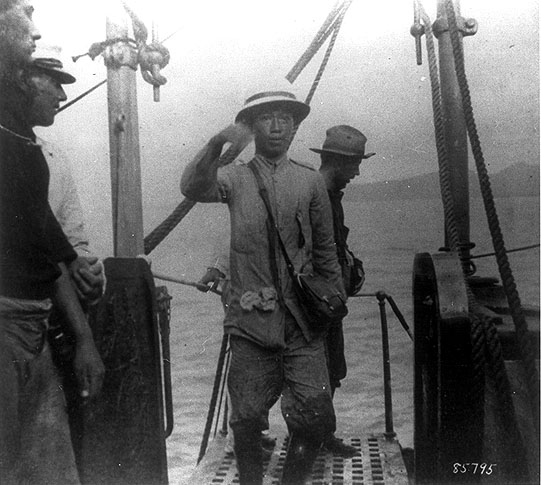
Emilio Aguinaldo boarding USS Vicksburg in Palanan Bay, facing the Philippine Sea

Although the province did not play a major role in the revolt against Spain, it is in Palanan that the final pages of the Philippine Revolution were written when United States troops, led by General Frederick Funston, finally captured General Emilio Aguinaldo on March 23, 1901. To commemorate this historical event, in 1962 the town officials constructed a monument by the Palanan City Hall, right on the spot where General Aguinaldo was captured, to memorialize the historic event. The monument was inaugurated on June 12, 1962, Philippine Independence Day, and still stands.

Isabela was re-organized as a province under the American military government through Act No. 210, passed August 24, 1901.

The Americans built schools and other buildings and instituted changes in the overall political system. However, the province's economy remained predominantly agricultural, with rice replacing corn and tobacco as the principal crop.

A new wave of immigration began in the late 19th and 20th centuries with the arrival of the Ilokano who came in large numbers. They now constitute the largest group in the province, and it was only in this large-scale Ilocano immigration & settlement that made Ilocano language replaced Ibanag as the lingua franca of the province. Other ethnic groups followed that made Isabela the "Melting Pot of the Northern Philippines".

=== Japanese occupation ===
World War II stagnated the province's economic growth but it recovered dramatically after the war. In 1942, Imperial Japanese forces occupied Isabela. In 1945, the liberation of Isabela commenced with the arrival of the Philippine Commonwealth troops under the 11th Infantry Regiment, Philippine Army, USAFIP-NL and the recognized guerrillas attacked by the Japanese Imperial forces in World War II.

=== Postwar era ===
In the years after the Second World War, Isabela was ruled by the Dy family for 35 years (1969-2004). The dynasty was started by the patriarch of the family, Faustino N. Dy Sr., who served as the mayor of Cauayan from 1965 to 1969 and sat as provincial governor for 22 years (1969–1992), surviving the initial attempts of President Ferdinand Marcos to remove him for being a member of the political opposition during the imposition of Martial Law in 1972 and winning reelection in 1988 after his removal by President Corazon Aquino after he had sided with Marcos in 1986.

=== Martial law era ===
By the first term of the presidency of Ferdinand Marcos, Isabela had become known among students activists for its remoteness and the poverty of its agricultural workers, making it a favorite destination for "dissatisfied, alienated young activists." So when the Communist Party of the Philippines (CPP) was established in 1968 after splitting from the largely-defeated old Communist Party (Partido Komunista ng Pilipinas-1930), Isabela became one of the first strongholds of its armed wing, the New People's Army. The actual size of the NPA at the time was very small, reportedly with only 60 guerrillas and 35 WWII-era guns as of 1969. But Marcos hyped up its formation, supposedly because this would help build up political and monetary support from the US. The Armed Forces had a number of initial successes against the NPA in Isabela at this time, including the discovery of the Taringsing Documents in Cordon outlining plans for a communist takeover; and the failed landing of arms bound for the NPA in Palanan during the MV Karagatan incident in 1972. These incidents were cited as some of the justifications for the declaration of Martial Law by Marcos later that year.

With only a year left in his last constitutionally allowed term as president Ferdinand Marcos placed the Philippines under Martial Law in September 1972 and thus retained the position for fourteen more years. This period in Philippine history is remembered for the Marcos administration's record of human rights abuses, particularly targeting political opponents, student activists, journalists, religious workers, farmers, and others who fought against the Marcos dictatorship. Two of the major detention centers for political detainees located in Isabela were Camp Melchor F. dela Cruz in Barangay Upi in Gamu, in which officers of the Armed Forces Northern Luzon Command were also stationed; and the Headquarters of the Isabela Province Philippine Constabulary in Barangay Baligatan, Ilagan. renamed Camp Lt. Rosauro Toda Jr. in 2020.

The province of Isabela became a particular center of both conflict and protest when Marcos cronies Danding Cojuangco and Antonio Carag managed to block a Spanish-era grant which was supposed to see the return of Hacienda San Antonio and Hacienda Santa Isabel in Ilagan to local farmers. Cojuangco and Carag purchased the two haciendas themselves, displacing tens of thousands of farmers who were supposed to get those lands back a hundred years after the Spanish acquired them.

In its desire to serve its parishioners, the Roman Catholic Diocese of Ilagan hosted a Social Action Center which would help the farmers. In the Social Action Center's newsletter, the "Courier," researcher Sabino Padilla Jr. documented and exposed the ways by which Cojuangco, Carag, the provincial government, and the military harassed the farmers who were supposed to get the land. This all led to a protest march in joined by 12,000 protesters from all over Isabela, and eventually, for 4,000 farmers to finally get the titles to their land. But it also earned the ire of the administration.

In 1982, Padilla and 12 others were arrested by the regime and jailed under poor conditions at the Bayombong, Nueva Vizcaya Stockade of the Philippine Constabulary until almost the end of the Marcos regime. In 1983, soldiers went as far as to raid the residence of the Bishop of Ilagan, Miguel Purugganan, in search of alleged rebels and firearms. They found none but continued to keep Bishop Puruggananan and the church workers under him under military surveillance.

In 1985, three councilors from Barangay Ibujan in the municipality of San Mariano, including Ibanag community leader Luis Gabriel who had rejected overtures for the establishment of a local CHDF base in the town, were forcibly taken by heavily armed men who claimed that they needed the three as guides. However, the three were never seen again, and they eventually became counted among the many desaparecidos during the Marcos dictatorship.

It was also during the dictatorship that Marcos began awarding logging concessions to his cronies in the areas of the Sierra Madre region, which heralded the beginning of widescale deforestation and other environmental problems that affect the province since then, despite Marcos creating the Palanan Wilderness Area in 1978 which was later expanded by President Fidel V. Ramos to become the Northern Sierra Madre Natural Park in 1997.

In 1975, construction began on the Magat Dam on the boundary of Ramon, Isabela with neighboring Ifugao Province, becoming a catchbasin for 8 rivers upstream in Ifugao and serving multiple functions, including: irrigating of agricultural lands; flood control; and power generation. The construction was protested by the Ifugao people due to the flooding of their ancestral lands, but the dam was eventually completed in 1982, partially funded through a loan from the World Bank.

After the People Power Revolution in 1986, many of the activists who had joined the underground movement decided to "surface," as the new administration of Corazon Aquino released political prisoners and initiated peace talks. However, anticommunist sentiment in her new cabinet made the peace process difficult, and negotiations eventually collapsed, and the insurgency in Isabela persisted.

=== Contemporary ===
Following the 1986 People Power Revolution, known as the current Fifth Philippine Republic, under the 1987 Philippine Constitution, various changes have been attempted since then in the province.

Dy Sr. was succeeded by his son, Benjamin G. Dy, in the gubernatorial seat from 1992 to 2001. Another Dy took over the gubernatorial seat in 2001 when Faustino Dy Jr. won the 2001 elections after having served as the district representative of the 2nd Legislative District of the province from 1992 to 2001. It was only in the 2004 elections that the family's control of the gubernatorial seat ended when Grace Padaca, a former journalist, won over Faustino Dy Jr. She was the first woman to serve as the governor of the province. After serving for six years (2004-2010), Padaca was defeated in the 2010 National Elections by Faustino "Bojie" G. Dy III who served as governor of the province for three consecutive terms (2010-2019). He was then succeeded by Rodolfo "Rodito" Albano III, a member of the Albano dynasty that dominates Isabela's 1st congressional district.

In July 1994, the municipality of Santiago was converted into an independent-component city by virtue of Republic Act 7720. In February 1998, the Republic Act 8528 was enacted which amended certain sections of the Republic Act 7720 causing Santiago to be a component city in the province of Isabela. However, in September 1999 through court ruling which granted the petition to declare Republic Act 8528 unconstitutional, hence, the status of Santiago was reverted back to independent-component city, due to lack of plebiscite. Santiago is geographically located in Isabela but not under the administration of the province. Its electorates are prohibited to participate in the provincial-level elections except in the 4th legislative district of Isabela where the city belongs for congress representation.

In June 1995, Republic Act 7891 was passed, legislating that Isabela be divided into two new provinces: Isabela del Norte and Isabela del Sur. A referendum was held on the same year with a slight majority voting against partitioning the province.

In 1999, the municipality of Ilagan, also serving as the capital town of the province, sought to become a city by virtue of Republic Act 8474. The plebiscite held on March 14, 1999, turned down its first bid for cityhood. The majority of the people voted no in that event. In its second attempt to achieve cityhood, the campaign did not go through due to lack of concurrency in the senate in 2006. Finally, Ilagan became a city, after its third move gained 96% of the votes in a plebiscite conducted on August 11, 2012. The night after the plebiscite, Ilagan was declared as a component city in the province by virtue of Republic Act 10169.

In 2001, the municipality of Cauayan became a component city in the province of Isabela through the ratification of Republic Act 9017.

In 2019, the province was reorganized into six districts, thereby increasing the number of legislative districts from four to six. Cities and municipalities were retained and others were reapportioned to the current district assignments.

==== 2020 Ulysses Flood ====
Cagayan has been heavily impacted by changing weather pattern changes resulting from climate change, with the 2020 Ulysses flood being counted as one of the most severe examples.

In November 2020, Typhoon Vamco (locally known in the Philippines as Typhoon Ulysses) crossed the country, dams from all around Luzon neared their spilling points, forcing them to release large amounts of water into their impounds including Magat Dam. The dam opened all of its 7 gates at 24 metres (79 ft), releasing over 5,037 cubic metres (1,331,000 US gal) of water into the Cagayan River flooding numerous riverside towns.

Because there was very little media coverage of the flooding in the area in the wake of the COVID-19 lockdown in Luzon and the Shutdown of ABS-CBN broadcasting earlier that year, residents resorted to social media to request the national government for rescue. As a result of the catastrophe, the National Irrigation Administration (NIA) indicated that it would review its protocols regarding the release of water in Magat Dam and improve its watershed.

== Geography ==
Isabela comprises an aggregate land area of 12,414.93 square kilometres (4,793.43 sq mi), representing almost 40 percent of the regional territory. It is the largest province in the island of Luzon and the second largest province in the Philippines by land area. Occupying the central section of the Cagayan Valley region in Luzon, Isabela is bordered by Cagayan to the north, Kalinga to the northwest, Mountain Province to the central-west, Ifugao and Nueva Vizcaya to the southwest, Quirino to the south, and Aurora to the south. To the east lies the Philippine Sea, making Isabela one of the typhoon-prone provinces in the country.

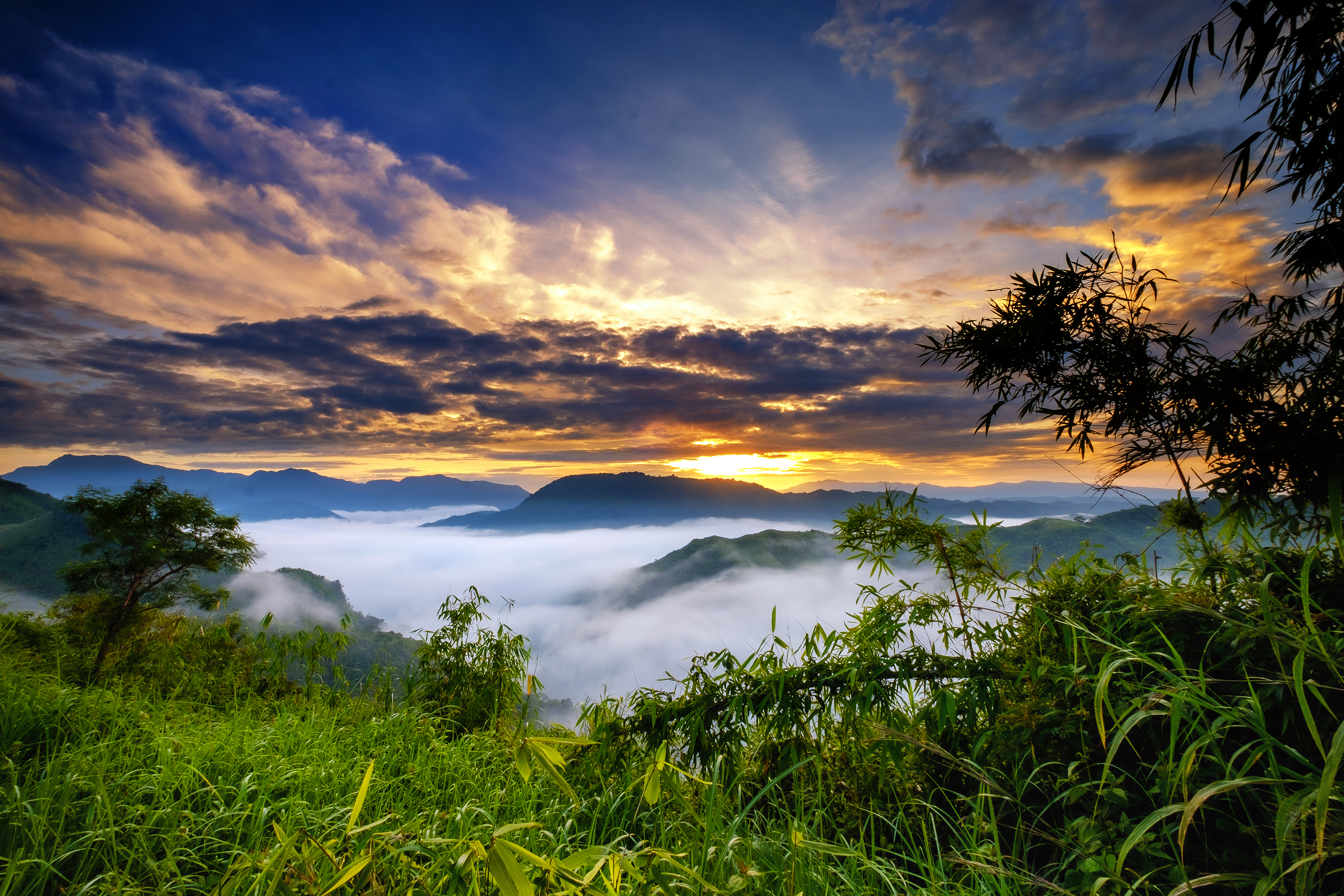
View of the Sierra Madre

The province is divided into three physiographic areas. The eastern area, straddled by the Sierra Madre mountain range, is rugged and thickly forested. A substantial portion is uncharted. These unexplored hinterlands are home to a rich variety of flora and fauna, and some are under government reservations. It is home to one of the world's largest remaining low-altitude rainforests, with numerous unknown endemic species of flora and fauna and biological diversity in the protected area known as the Northern Sierra Madre Natural Park. Isabela has 600,000 hectares (1,500,000 acres) of Cagayan Valley's 900,000 hectares (2,200,000 acres) of forest cover.

The highest point of the province is located near the border with Cagayan. Mount Dos Cuernos peak has an elevation of 1,785 metres (5,856 ft) located in San Pablo near the border with Maconacon. Other notable peaks in the Northern Sierra Madre Natural Park is Mount Cresta in Divilacan with an elevation of 1,672 metres (5,486 ft).

The western area is a fertile valley hemmed by the Central Cordillera. It is crisscrossed by the mighty Cagayan River, Siffu River, and Magat River.

=== Mallig Plains region ===
Mallig Plains is a region in the western section of the province. Its name was derived from the rolling terrains or kilometers of plain lands in western part of Isabela. The municipality of Roxas serves as the business center of the region. The Plains encompass the municipalities of Quezon, Mallig, Quirino, Burgos, Aurora, San Manuel and Roxas.

=== Administrative divisions ===
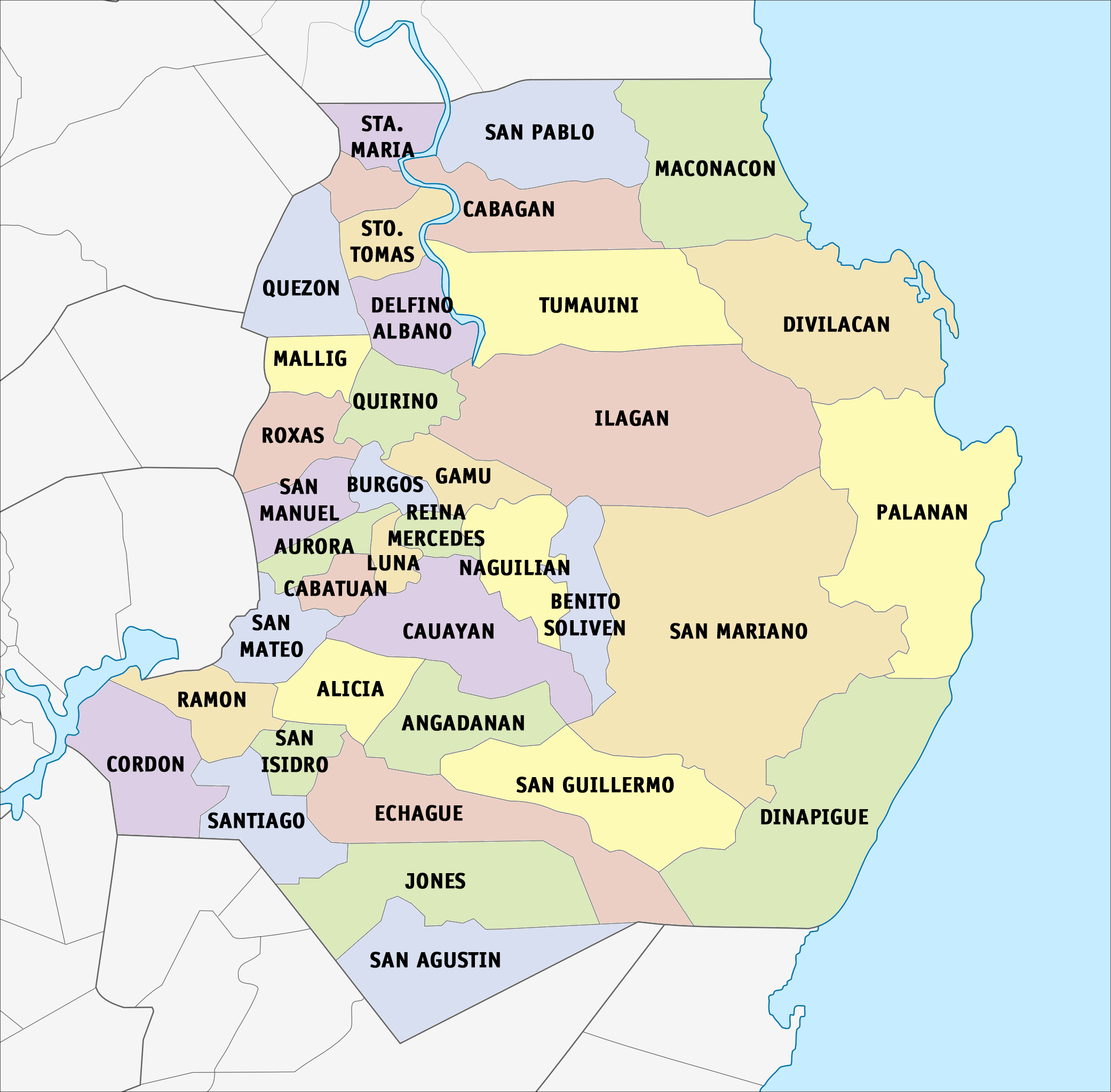
Political map of Isabela

Isabela is politically subdivided into 34 municipalities, two component cities and one independent component city. The province is represented in the Philippine House of Representatives with six legislative districts.

The province has ten first class municipalities, two second class cities and one first class independent component city. Ilagan, which became a city in 2011 after a failed proposal in 1998, it is now Luzon's largest and the country's fourth largest city by land area after Davao City, Puerto Princesa and Zamboanga City.

- † Provincial capital and component city
- ^ Independent component city
- ∗ Component city
- Municipality
- ∞ Largest settlement

City or municipality		District	Population			±% p.a.	Area		Density		Barangay	Coordinates^{[A]}
			(2020)		(2015)		km^{2}	sq mi	/km^{2}	/sq mi		
Alicia		3rd	4.4%	73,874	71,504	0.62%	154.10	59.50	480	1,200	34	16°46′44″N 121°41′57″E
Angadanan		3rd	2.7%	44,977	43,061	0.83%	204.40	78.92	220	570	59	16°45′24″N 121°44′53″E
Aurora		5th	2.2%	36,621	35,017	0.86%	115.56	44.62	320	830	33	16°59′26″N 121°38′21″E
Benito Soliven		2nd	1.8%	29,752	29,624	0.08%	197.52	76.26	150	390	29	16°59′05″N 121°57′41″E
Burgos		5th	1.5%	26,040	23,784	1.74%	73.10	28.22	360	930	14	17°04′05″N 121°41′37″E
Cabagan		1st	3.2%	53,897	50,174	1.37%	430.40	166.18	120	310	26	17°25′35″N 121°45′54″E
Cabatuan		3rd	2.4%	40,223	39,413	0.28%	72.00	27.80	560	1,500	22	16°57′15″N 121°40′11″E
Cauayan City^{[1]}	∗	6th	8.5%	143,403	129,523	1.96%	336.40	129.88	430	1,100	65	16°56′03″N 121°46′00″E
Cordon		4th	2.7%	46,477	42,926	1.52%	144.00	55.60	320	830	26	16°40′26″N 121°27′58″E
Delfin Albano		1st	1.8%	29,928	26,614	2.26%	189.00	72.97	160	410	29	17°18′16″N 121°46′44″E
Dinapigue		4th	0.3%	5,821	5,005	2.92%	1,031.93	398.43	5.6	15	6	16°31′29″N 122°15′47″E
Divilacan		1st	0.3%	5,827	5,687	0.46%	889.49	343.43	6.6	17	12	17°19′47″N 122°17′46″E
Echague		6th	5.2%	88,410	79,094	2.14%	648.38	250.34	140	360	64	16°43′00″N 121°41′00″E
Gamu		2nd	1.8%	30,655	29,904	0.47%	129.40	49.96	240	620	16	17°02′50″N 121°50′00″E
Ilagan City∞^{[2]}	†	1st	9.3%	158,218	145,568	1.60%	1,166.26	450.30	140	360	91	17°08′39″N 121°53′20″E
Jones		4th	2.7%	45,628	45,666	−0.02%	670.14	258.74	68	180	42	16°33′33″N 121°42′13″E
Luna		5th	1.2%	20,697	19,326	1.31%	44.94	17.35	460	1,200	19	16°58′06″N 121°43′45″E
Maconacon		1st	0.2%	3,977	4,253	−1.27%	538.66	207.98	7.4	19	10	17°23′21″N 122°14′23″E
Mallig		5th	1.9%	32,208	30,459	1.07%	158.55	61.22	200	520	18	17°12′41″N 121°36′40″E
Naguilian		2nd	2.0%	33,788	31,902	1.10%	169.81	65.56	200	520	25	17°01′23″N 121°50′06″E
Palanan		2nd	1.0%	17,684	17,260	0.46%	880.24	339.86	20	52	17	17°03′46″N 122°25′45″E
Quezon		5th	1.6%	27,037	25,860	0.85%	207.07	79.95	130	340	15	17°18′41″N 121°36′21″E
Quirino		5th	1.5%	25,023	24,501	0.40%	126.20	48.73	200	520	21	17°09′10″N 121°45′19″E
Ramon		3rd	3.3%	56,523	52,707	1.34%	135.17	52.19	420	1,100	19	16°46′53″N 121°32′06″E
Reina Mercedes		2nd	1.6%	27,900	26,998	0.63%	57.14	22.06	490	1,300	20	16°59′15″N 121°49′07″E
Roxas		5th	3.9%	65,839	61,773	1.22%	139.95	54.03	470	1,200	26	17°07′18″N 121°37′11″E
San Agustin		4th	1.3%	22,096	22,880	−0.66%	278.40	107.49	79	200	23	16°30′24″N 121°44′51″E
San Guillermo		6th	1.2%	20,915	20,200	0.66%	457.35	176.58	46	120	26	16°43′11″N 121°48′31″E
San Isidro		6th	1.6%	27,044	24,861	1.62%	71.90	27.76	380	980	13	16°44′03″N 121°38′01″E
San Manuel		5th	2.0%	34,085	31,896	1.27%	112.77	43.54	300	780	19	17°01′20″N 121°37′54″E
San Mariano		2nd	3.5%	60,124	55,370	1.58%	1,459.16	563.38	41	110	36	16°59′01″N 122°00′46″E
San Mateo		3rd	3.9%	66,663	64,505	0.63%	120.60	46.56	550	1,400	33	16°52′52″N 121°35′16″E
San Pablo		1st	1.6%	26,320	25,384	0.69%	637.90	246.29	41	110	17	17°26′54″N 121°47′43″E
Santa Maria		1st	1.5%	25,758	25,382	0.28%	124.90	48.22	210	540	20	17°28′17″N 121°45′09″E
Santiago City^{[3]}	^	4th	8.8%	148,580	134,830	1.87%	255.50	98.65	580	1,500	37	16°41′15″N 121°32′41″E
Santo Tomas		1st	1.4%	24,528	23,005	1.23%	80.58	31.11	300	780	27	17°23′59″N 121°45′57″E
Tumauini		1st	4.2%	70,743	67,650	0.85%	471.68	182.12	150	390	46	17°16′26″N 121°48′35″E
Total^{[B]}				1,697,050	1,593,566	1.21%	13,102.05	5,058.73	130	340	1,055	(see GeoGroup box)
1. Coordinates mark the city/town center, and are sortable by latitude.; 2. Total figures include the independent component city of Santiago.; ^{1} Became a component city on March 30, 2001, under Republic Act 9017.; ^{2} Became a component city on August 11, 2012, under Republic Act 10169.; ^{3} Became an independent component city on July 6, 1994, under Republic Act 7720.

=== Barangays ===
The 34 municipalities and 3 cities of the province comprise 1,055 barangays, with Rizal in Santiago City as the most populous in 2010, and Catalina in Cauayan as the least. If cities are excluded, Bugallon Proper (Poblacion) in Ramon has the highest population, and Uauang-Tuliao in Santo Tomas has the lowest.

== Government ==
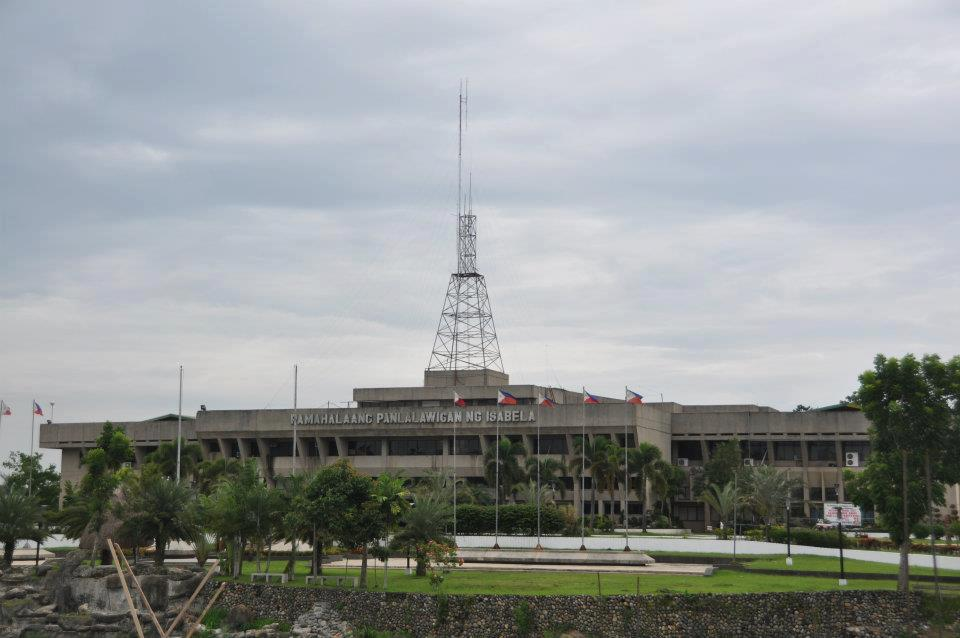
Isabela Provincial Capitol

=== Governors ===
After Isabela was re-organized as a province under the American regime in 1901, its first provincial governor was Rafael Maramag, a former Municipal President and also the first Municipal President of the capital town Ilagan. He was succeeded by his brother, Gabriel. Since 1969, the position has been occupied mostly by members of the Dy family, a political dynasty based in Cauayan that has expanded to neighboring municipalities. The current governor is Rodolfo "Rodito" Albano III, a member of the Albano dynasty that dominates Isabela's 1st congressional district and is an ally of the Dys.

Members of the Isabela Provincial Council (2022-2025)
Main article: Province of the Philippines
Main article: Cagayan Valley
- Governor: Rodolfo T. Albano III (PFP)
- Vice-Governor: Francis Faustino A. Dy (Lakas)

Sangguniang Panlalawigan Members

1st District

- Evyn Jay C. Diaz (PFP)
- Emmanuel Joselito B. Añes (PFP)

2nd District

- Ed Christian S. Go (Lakas)
- Angelica L. Reyes (Lakas)

3rd District

- Jose T. Panganiban Jr. (NPC)
- Ramon Juan N. Reyes Jr. (NPC)

4th District

- Clifford R. Raspado (PFP)
- Abegail V. Sable (PFP)

5th District

- Jonathan Jose C. Calderon (Aksyon)
- Manuel Faustino U. Dy (LDP)

6th District

- Marco Paolo A. Meris (PFP)
- Amador A. Gaffud Jr. (PFP)

Ex-Officio Members

- Maria Katrina Jessica Dy (President, Liga ng mga Barangay)
- Antonio Hui (President, PCL)
- Catherine Joy Legaspi (President, Panlalawigang Pederasyon ng Sangguniang Kabataan)
- Margarette Chin (Representative, IPMRP)

=== Legislative districts ===
On September 27, 2018, Republic Act No. 11080, an act reapportioning the province of Isabela into six legislative districts from four, was signed into law and the reapportioned districts elected its representatives starting in the 2019 midterm elections. Accordingly, the six districts are as follows:

- First District: Cabagan, Delfin Albano, Divilacan, Ilagan City, Maconacon, San Pablo, Santa Maria, Santo Tomas, and Tumauini.
- Second District: Benito Soliven, Gamu, Naguilian, Palanan, Reina Mercedes, and San Mariano.
- Third District: Alicia, Angadanan, Cabatuan, Ramon, and San Mateo.
- Fourth District: Cordon, Dinapigue, Jones, Santiago City, and San Agustin.
- Fifth District: Aurora, Burgos, Luna, Mallig, Quezon, Quirino, Roxas, and San Manuel.
- Sixth District: Cauayan City, Echague, San Guillermo, and San Isidro.

== House of Representatives ==
District	Representative	Party	Term	Bloc
1st	Antonio T. Albano	PFP	3	Majority
2nd	Ed Christopher S. Go	PFP	3	Majority
3rd	Ian Paul L. Dy	Lakas	3	Majority
4th	Joseph S. Tan	PFP	2	Majority
5th	Faustino Michael Carlos T. Dy III	Lakas	3	Majority
6th	Faustino D. Dy III	PFP	1	Majority

== Demographics ==
Population census of Isabela
Year	Pop.	±% p.a.
1903	76,431	—
1918	112,960	+2.64%
1939	219,864	+3.22%
1948	264,495	+2.07%
1960	442,062	+4.37%
1970	648,123	+3.90%
1975	730,386	+2.43%
1980	870,604	+3.57%
1990	1,080,341	+2.18%
1995	1,160,721	+1.35%
2000	1,287,575	+2.25%
2007	1,401,495	+1.18%
2010	1,489,645	+2.24%
2015	1,593,566	+1.29%
2020	1,697,050	+1.33%
2024	1,733,048	+0.51%
Source: Philippine Statistics Authority

The population of Isabela in the 2024 census was 1,733,048 people, making it the most populated province among the five provinces in Cagayan Valley (Region II). It had a density of 140 inhabitants per square kilometre or 360 inhabitants per square mile.

In 2010, Isabela had a population of 1,489,645 people: 46 percent of the 3.2 million people in the region at that time. At the national level, the province contributed 1.58 percent to the total population of 88.57 million. There were 254,928 households in the province in 2007.

For all ages, the sex ratio in Isabela was about 105 with 660,627 males and 626,948 females in the 2000 Census of Population and Housing (Census 2000). There are more males than females below 50 years old.

Ilocanos are the most prominent group in the province. Of the total household population, 68.71 percent classified themselves as Ilocanos, followed by the Ibanags (14.05 percent), and Tagalogs (10.02 percent). The majority ethnic group were the Ibanags, who were first seen by the Spanish explorers and converted to Christianity by missionaries, the reason why the Ibanag language had spread throughout the valley region prior to the arrival of the migrating Ilocanos. The remaining 7.22 percent are either Gaddang, Paranan, Yogad, or from other ethnic groups who have assimilated into the Ibanag-Ilocano culture. More recently, a new group from the south, the Muslim Filipinos, have migrated to this province and have made a community for themselves. In addition to this, Tagalog-speaking peoples from Central Luzon (mostly from Nueva Ecija and Aurora) and Southern Luzon have also settled in the area, as well as a few Pangasinans and Kapampangans from the Central Luzon and Cebuanos and Hiligaynons from Visayas and Mindanao; the majority of the population of Palanan are Tagalogs, with ancestors being settlers from Baler, Aurora during Spanish territorial rule.

=== Languages ===
Major languages spoken are Ilocano followed by Ibanag, Yogad, and Gaddang. Ilocanos and Ibanags speak Ilocano with an Ibanag accent, as descendants of Ilocanos from first generation in Isabela who lived within Ibanag population learned Ibanag; same situation with Ilocano tinged by Gaddang, Paranan, Yogad, and Itawis accents when descendants of Ilocanos from first generation in Isabela who lived within Gaddang, Paranan, Yogad, and Itawis populations learned their languages. People especially in the capital and commercial centers speak and understand English and Tagalog. Tagalogs, Ilocanos, and Ibanags speak Tagalog with an Ibanag accent, as descendants of Tagalogs from first generation in Isabela who lived within Ibanag population learned Ibanag. Languages not native in Isabela are also spoken there such as Maranao, Maguindanaon, Tausug, Pangasinan, Kapampangan, Cebuano and Hiligaynon to varying degrees by their respective ethnic communities within the province.

=== Religion ===
Roman Catholicism is the predominant faith followed by about 80% of the people. Iglesia ni Cristo is the second most popular religion, with 4% of the population. Other religions include Members Church of God International (MCGI), Aglipayan, United Methodist Church, the Church of Jesus Christ of Latter-day Saints, Baptists, Seventh-day Adventists, Jehovah's Witnesses, and other Charismatic Christians. There are also a small number of Muslims.

== Economy ==
Poverty incidence of Isabela (%)

Source: Philippine Statistics Authority

In terms of income classification, Isabela is rated as first-class province and considered among the richest and most progressive province in the Philippines and the most progressive in Region 02 courtesy of the three key cities strategically located in the province.

=== Trade and industry ===
Strategically located at the center of Cagayan Valley region, Isabela is acknowledged to have demonstrated strengths in business and industry. Thus, it has come to be known as the Regional Trade and Industrial Center of north-eastern Luzon.

The province of Isabela is the richest in Cagayan Valley. It is also the 9th Richest Province in the Philippines last 2021.

The cities of Cauayan, Ilagan, Santiago and the town of Roxas are the principal commercial centers of the province. Metro Manila-based malls and fast food chains have recently opened in these key trading hubs. To date, 192 banking branches operate in the province, with most of the universal and commercial banks providing automated teller machines for the convenience of their clients.

Since the start of the 21st century, a growing number of foreign and local investors have selected Isabela as site of their business ventures. Heading the list are Isabela's top investors, namely: Mindanao Grains Processing Company, Inc., SN Aboitiz Power- Magat Inc., Universal Leaf Philippines, Coca-Cola Beverages Philippines, Inc., San Miguel Corporation, RC Cola and Pepsi Cola.

=== Agriculture ===
Agriculture is the biggest industry in Isabela. As the country's top corn producing province, it contributes 13.02% of the annual national yellow corn production. Asia's largest post-harvest corn processing facility, the Mindanao Grains, is located in the town of Reina Mercedes.

As second highest rice-growing province nationwide, Isabela produces 15% of the aggregate national rice production on an annual basis. Being a surplus producer of the Filipinos' staple crop, the province's rice sufficiency rate is at 224%, which means that Isabelinos produce more than they consume and are in fact responsible for supplying the rice requirements of Metro Manila and many other provinces. The unprecedented increase in palay production of Isabela made the province the Hybrid Rice Champion of the Philippines.

High-value agricultural crops grown in Isabela include monggo, tobacco, coffee, banana, and mango. Its livestock and poultry industries are also on the rise, especially dairy processing, hog production, cattle breeding, and commercial poultry raising.

Farming is highly mechanized as most of the agricultural lands are irrigated. With the presence of the Isabela State University, joint ventures and other foreign assisted projects and the Magat Dam contribute to the high productivity in agriculture. It is also the hub of trade and commerce and other economic activities due to its central location in the region. The wood industry used to be a top earner for the province but due to the logging ban imposed in the Cagayan Valley Region, activities in this industry considerably declined. However, furniture making using narra wood and other indigenous forest materials continue to exist.

Isabela is one of the most progressive provinces of the Philippines having been adjudged as the most outstanding province on food security in the Gawad Sapat Ani Awards 2000. For corn production, Isabela ranks first among the top ten corn producing provinces for cy 2004, contributing 15.70% to national production. In 2013, the Department of Agriculture declared Isabela as the Best Corn-Quality Awardee. Ilagan City was proclaimed as the Corn Capital of the Philippines for being the top corn producer among the 34 municipalities and 2 cities of the province as well as in the whole country.

=== Forestland ===
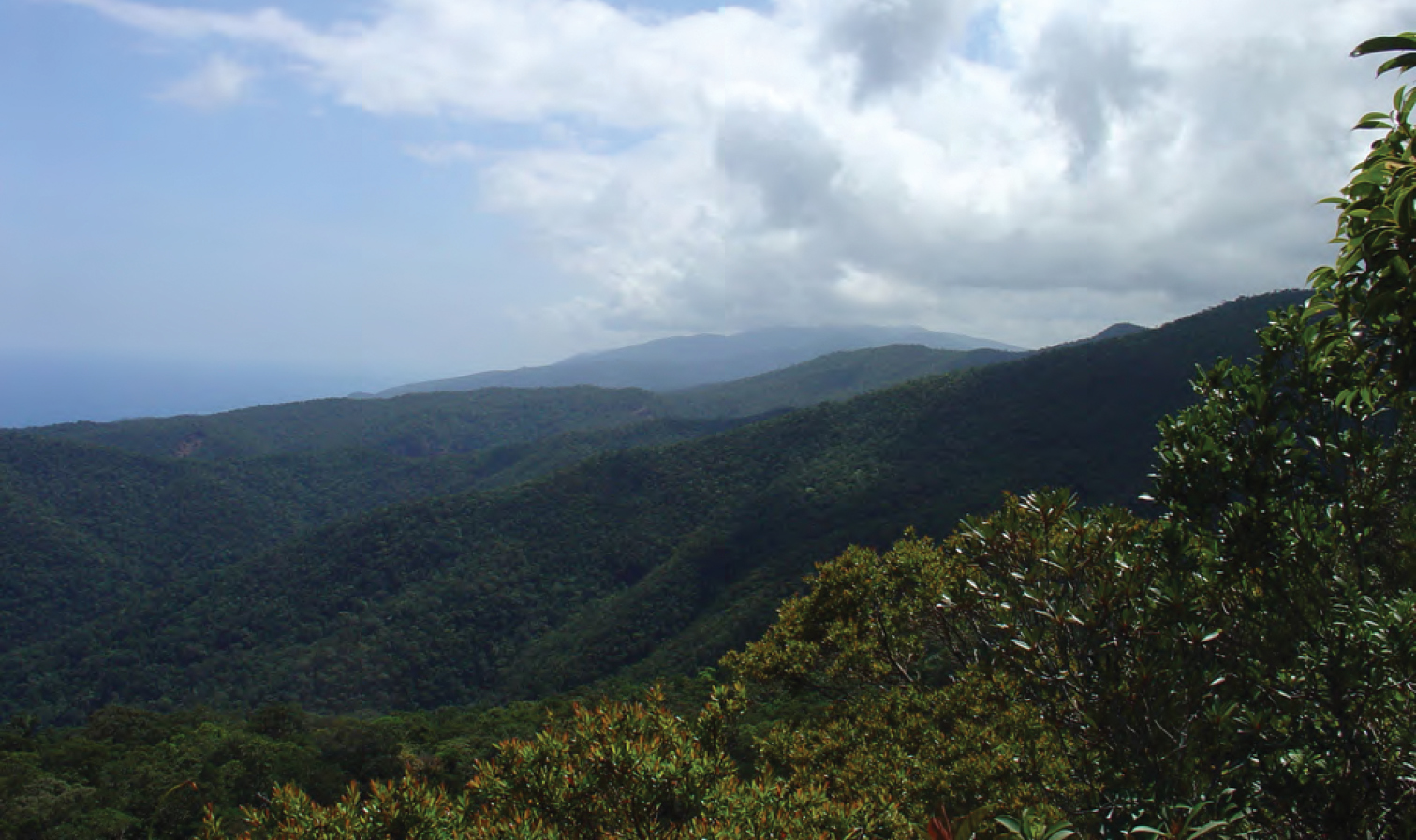
Forests in Palanan

Forestland covers 54.37% or 579,819 hectares (1,432,760 acres) of Isabela's total land area of which 62% is protected forest and 38% is production forest. The best quality of timber resources in the Philippines are found in Isabela's forests. Isabela's vast forest resources are now being ecologically managed to effect sustainable forest-based resource not only for the wood working industry but to secure a balanced ecosystem. The woodwork industry continues to operate under a regulated system, particularly the making of furniture using indigenous materials.

=== Fisheries ===
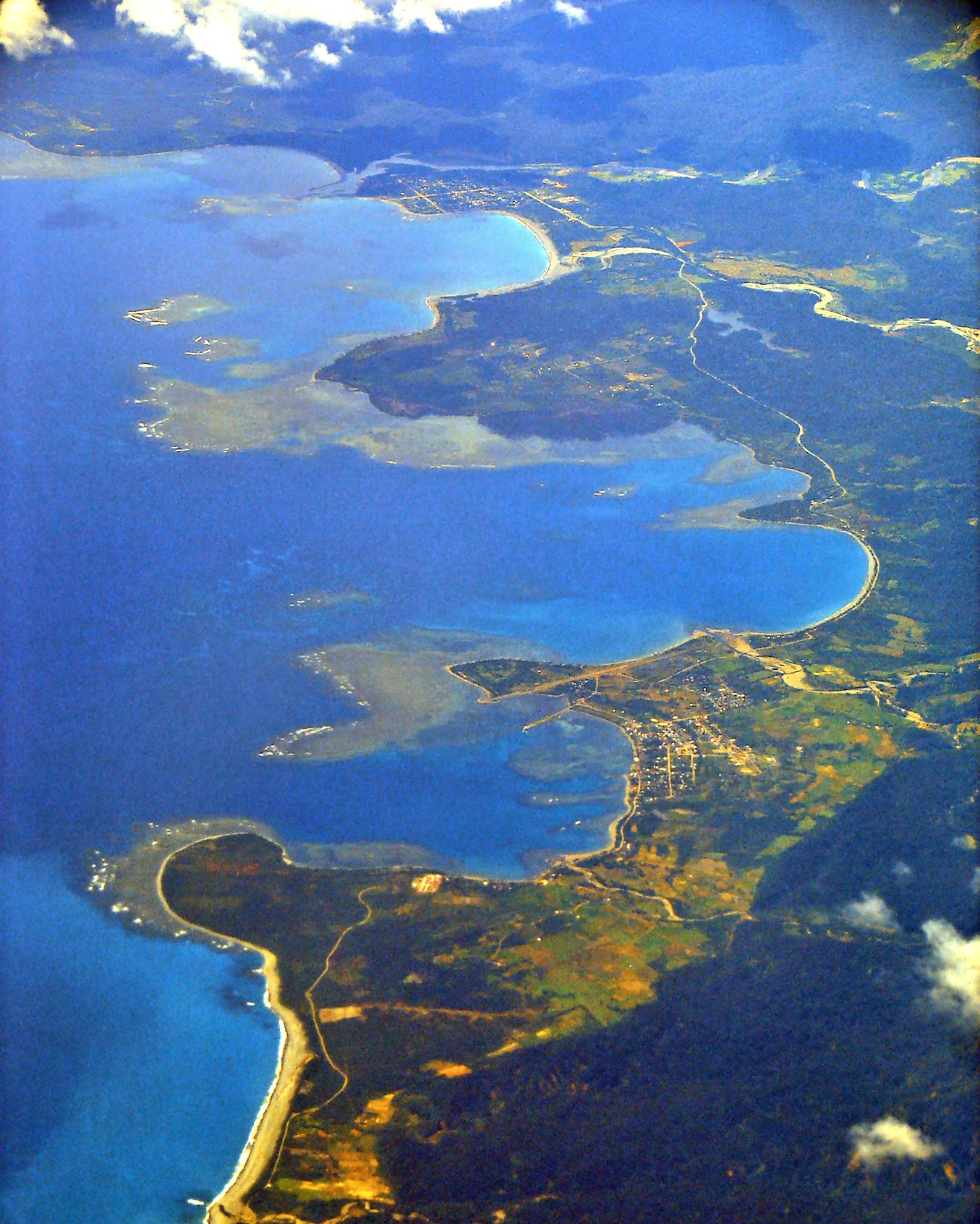
Isabela's coast in Divilacan

Isabela has a fertile fishing ground on the Pacific Coast. The Magat Dam reservoir is utilized for fish cage operations for tilapia production for domestic markets. Another thriving industry in the province is aquaculture, sustained by inland fishing through 1,108 hectares of developed freshwater fishponds and 450 hectares of fish cage culture at Magat Dam Reservoir. There are 238 marine fish species that were identified by the Bureau of Fisheries and Aquatic Resources in Isabela's coastal seaboard municipalities of Maconacon, Divilacan, Palanan, and Dinapigue.

=== Mineral and energy ===
Large deposits of copper, gold, zinc and chromite, manganese and nickel have been found in Isabela. It also has extensive deposits of non-metallic minerals such as limestone, clay, marbles, guano, sand and gravel, and boulders. Indigenous energy sources such as natural gas and hydroelectric capabilities have been found to be abundant in the valley. Many of its mineral reserves have yet to be fully tapped.

=== Power ===
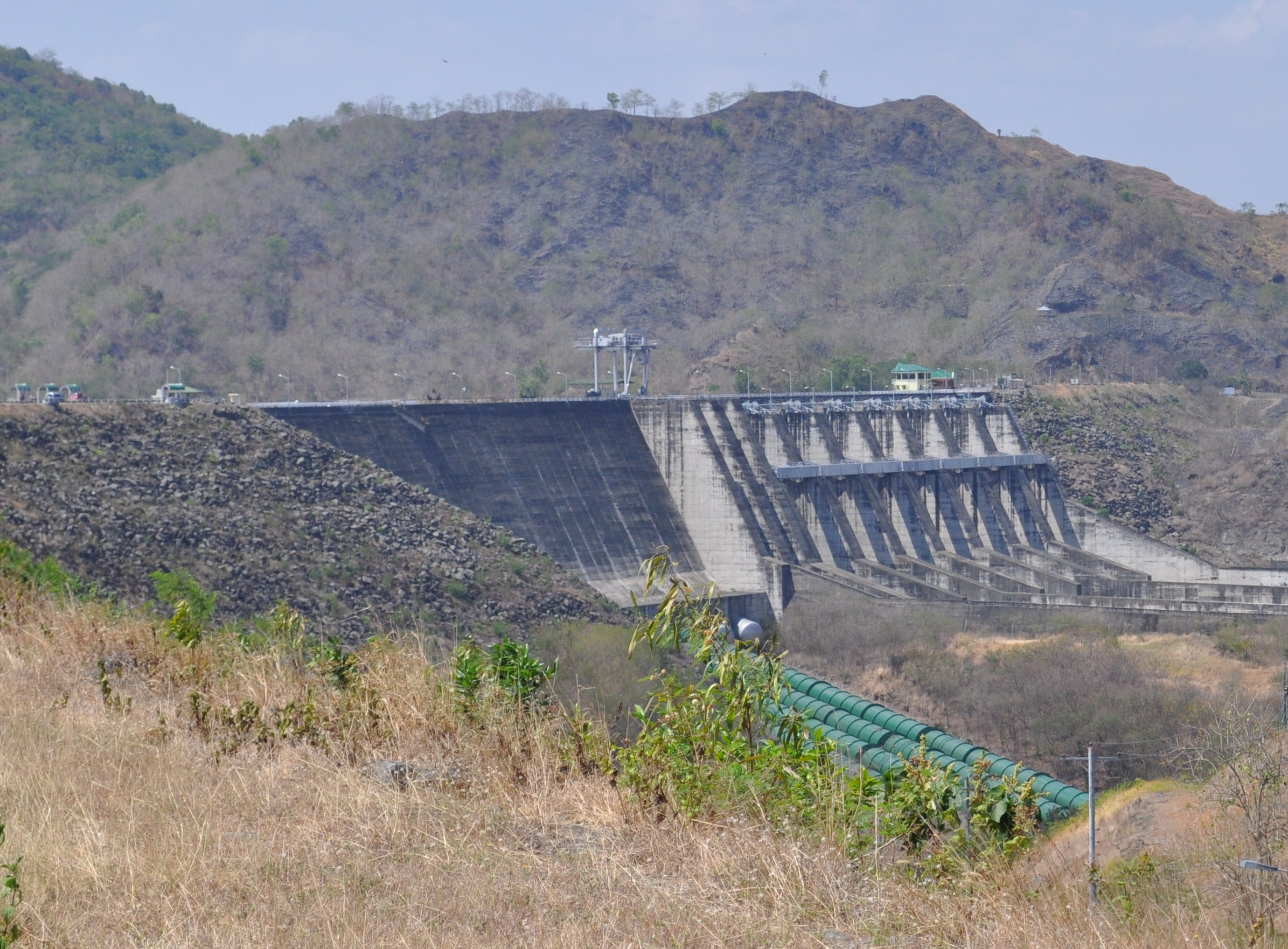
Magat Dam in Ramon

Solar and biomass power plants in the city of Cauayan and in the town of Alicia have started operating in 2015 to supplement the region's high energy demand. The online solar power plant in Cauayan is capable of supplying at least 20 megawatts while the biomass power plant in Alicia can produce another 20 megawatts. Both systems provide clean and renewable energy. The P2 billion power facility established by the Isabela Biomass Energy Corporation (IBEC) was built to augment power supply in the Cagayan Valley region. The use of biomass as fuel makes the power plant carbon neutral and sustainable. This biomass power facility is the first in the region and is designed to provide economical source of energy as well as job opportunities to residents of the host town/city.

On 27 May 2015, the service contract of the largest solar PV power plant in the country has been approved by the Department of Energy (DOE). The P7-billion worth 100 MW Solar PV project in the city of Ilagan is designed to reduce the current shortage of electricity that causes regular blackouts that results to industry closures as well as inconvenience to the consumers. The solar power facility will be constructed at a 100-hectare land at Barangay Cabannungan, several kilometers away from the city proper.

In December 2022, the Department of Energy (DOE) has given the go signal to a Filipino-French joint venture to develop one of the biggest renewable energy projects in the Philippines - an P18-billion solar farm in Ilagan City. The project will be undertaken by San Ignacio Energy Resources Development Corporation, which is part of the Nextnorth Energy Group developing over 450 megawatts of solar and hydro projects in Northern Luzon, and French firm Total Eren S.A. The project will involve the development of a 440 MWp/336 MWac solar PV project to be built on around 400 hectares of available land located along the Northern Luzon high voltage transmission network of the National Grid Corporation of the Philippines (NGCP). The project is scheduled to start construction in 2024 and start feeding electricity into the grid in 2025.

== Transportation ==
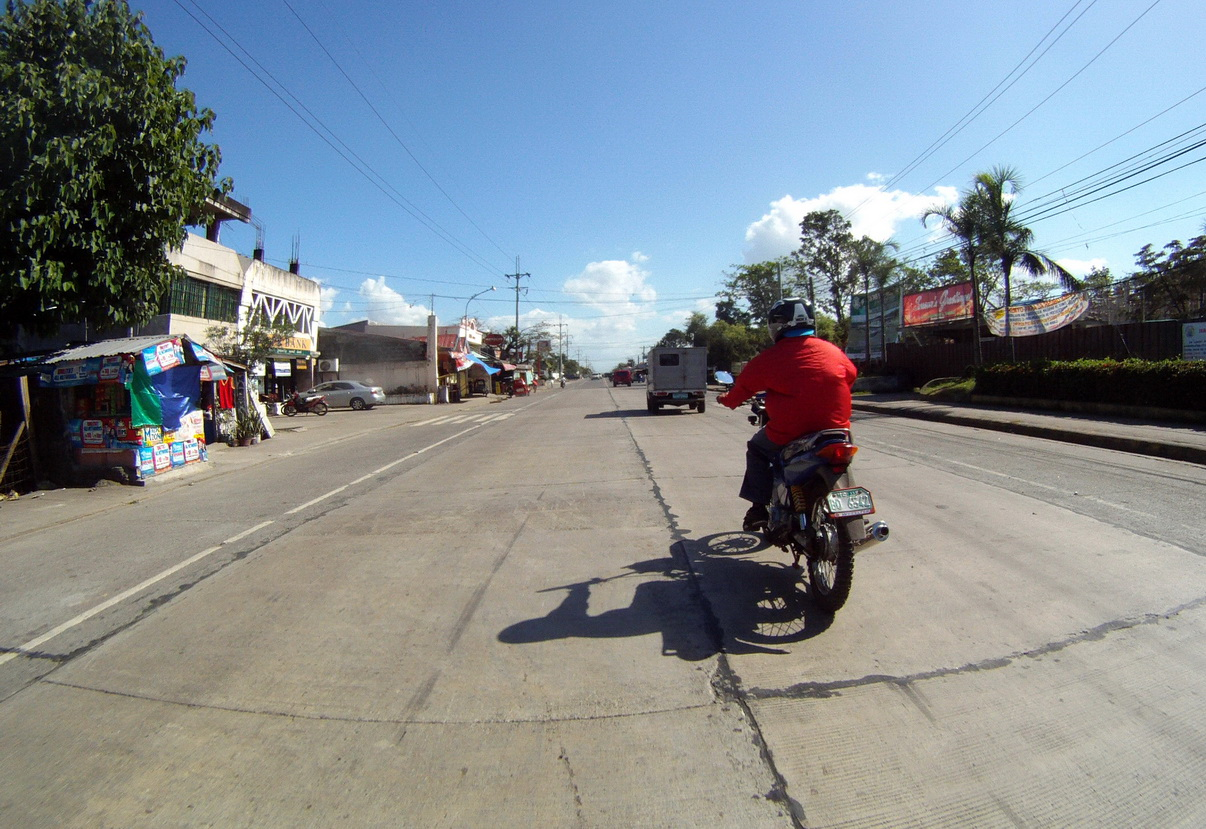
A road in Ramon

Isabela is accessible by all means of transportation. Almost 180-kilometers of the Pan-Philippine Highway pass through the different towns and cities of the province. Several bus companies offer daily trips to different routes like Manila, Dagupan, Baguio, Ilocos, and vice versa. Public utility vans and small-time bus operators ply daily trips from Tuguegarao in Cagayan to Santiago City vice versa, while jeepneys and tricycles are commonly used as the basic mode of transportation within the province's jurisdiction.

=== Ilagan–Divilacan Road ===
The construction of an 82-kilometer route across the Sierra Madre National Park is intended to improve access to the province's three coastal communities - Divilacan, Maconacon, and Palanan. The project's authorized budget contract, worth P1.5 billion, will traverse the foothills of the Northern Sierra Madre mountain ranges, which cover 359,486 hectares. The idea is to rehabilitate an ancient logging route that was utilized until the 1990s by a defunct logging firm. It will begin in Barangay Sindon Bayabo in Ilagan City and end at Barangay Dicatian in Divilacan's seaside town. The project is scheduled to conclude in 2021.

The secluded coastal settlements of Divilacan, Palanan, and Maconacon are frequently accessible only by boat or plane, making these difficult to reach at times of emergencies and calamities. There are no reliable road networks connecting Isabela's capital city to the coastal districts, denying locals access to basic commodities and social services such as health care. Once completed, the route is projected to bolster coastal economies, citing Divilacan's 119-hectare beach and freshwater areas that have attracted tourists.

Resolution No. 11 of the Protected Area Management Board (PAMB) reclassifies areas of the Sierra Madre as a special-use zone. Additionally, the Agta and Dumagat communities in the vicinity have signed a memorandum of understanding with the provincial administration expressing their support for the road project. At least 1,800 Agta and Dumagat have made their homes in park areas. However, the road's impact on the protected forest has upset neighbors, who believe the project will harm the region's woods and ecosystems. The project has been delayed in recent years due to worries about the road's possible environmental impact. The Cagayan Valley Regional Development Council required that the road's proponents conduct a comprehensive analysis of the road's impact on the area's biodiversity.

=== Airports and sea ports ===
There are three airports in the province. The Cauayan Airport is the primary airport in the province serving a trip to Manila, Palanan, and Maconacon. The other two are the Palanan Airport in Palanan and Maconacon Airport in Maconacon. The country's leading passenger airline Cebu Pacific services the Cauayan-Manila-Cauayan Route. Light planes operated by Cyclone Airways and WCC Aviation's Sky Pasada Have flights from Cauayan Domestic Airport to the community airports in Palanan and Maconacon. The province has two minor seaports, the Divilacan Port and Palanan Port in the coastal towns of Divilacan and Palanan. The trade going to the ports comes primarily from major seaports in Cagayan such as Port of Aparri in Aparri, Cagayan, and Port of San Vicente and Port Irene, both in Santa Ana, Cagayan. The other two airstrips are found in Divilacan, and in Magat River Management Project Site.

== Education ==
The DepEd Isabela Schools Division Office administers public education in the province, while the cities of Cauayan, Ilagan, and Santiago operate separate schools division offices for their respective jurisdictions. These offices manage and supervise basic education services. The TESDA oversees the technical vocational education and training, while CHED regulates higher education programs.

Isabela is one of the primary centers of education in the Cagayan Valley Region. There are several public and private educational institutions, the most notable being the Isabela State University, a government-owned and controlled public university. Its main campus is located in Echague and satellite campuses in Cauayan, Ilagan City, Angadanan, Cabagan, Jones, Palanan (extension), Roxas, San Mariano, San Mateo and Santiago City (extension).

=== Colleges and universities ===
Among the most notable higher educational institutions found in the province of Isabela are the following:

- AMA Computer College (City of Santiago Campus)
- Cagayan Valley Computer and Information Technology College, Inc. (City of Santiago Campus)
- East Asia International System College (City of Cauayan Campus)
- HGBaquiran College (HGBaquiran College; Tumauini Campus)
- International Technological Institute of Arts and Tourism (City of Ilagan Campus)
- Isabela State University (Angadanan Campus)
- Isabela State University (Echague; Main Campus)
- Isabela State University (Cabagan Campus)
- Isabela State University (City of Cauayan Campus)
- Isabela State University (Jones Campus)
- Isabela State University (City of Ilagan Campus)
- Isabela State University (Roxas Campus)
- Isabela State University (San Mariano Campus)
- Isabela State University (San Mateo Campus)
- Isabela State University (Palanan Extension Campus)
- Isabela State University (City of Santiago Extension Campus)
- Isabela College of Arts and Technology (City of Cauayan Campus)
- Mallig Plains Colleges (Mallig Campus)
- National Police College Regional Training School (City of Cauayan Campus)
- Northeastern College (City of Santiago Campus)
- Northeast Luzon Adventist College (Alicia Campus)
- Our Lady of the Pillar College (City of Cauayan Campus)
- Our Lady of the Pillar College (San Manuel Campus)
- La Patria College (City of Santiago Campus)
- Philippine Normal University (Alicia, Isabela Campus)
- Saint Clare College of Region 2 (City of Cauayan Campus)
- Saint Ferdinand College (Cabagan Satellite Campus)
- Saint Ferdinand College (City of Ilagan; Main Campus)
- Santiago City Colleges
- Santiago City Polytechnic College
- STI College (City of Cauayan Campus)
- Technical Education and Skills Development Authority (City of Ilagan; TESDA Accredited Competency Assessment Center)
- University of La Salette (City of Santiago Campus)
- University of Perpetual Help System (City of Cauayan, Isabela Campus)

== Tourism ==
Since the early 2000s, tourism has become an income-generating industry for Isabela. New hotels and resorts have opened, mostly in the cities of Ilagan, Cauayan and Santiago, and the towns of Tumauini, Gamu, Roxas, Alicia, Burgos, Ramon, San Mariano and Cordon. Top tourist attractions are the centuries-old churches; Magat Dam Tourism Complex, which houses Southeast Asia's biggest dam; Santa Victoria Caves, Pinzal Falls and Ilagan Sanctuary at Fuyot National Park; the white sand beaches in the coastal municipalities of Maconacon, Divilacan, Palanan, Dinapigue and islands of coastal Isabela; the world's biggest wooden lounge chair or butaka in Ilagan City; and various festivals and fiestas, including the Bambanti Festival annually celebrated every February, and the commemoration of the birth of the province during Isabela Day every May.

=== Places of interest ===
Tourist attraction	Location
Abuan River	Ilagan City
Aguinaldo Shrine — Historic capture and heroism of General Emilio Aguinaldo	Palanan
Ancient Burial Site (Archaeological Site)	Palanan
Antagan Caves	Tumauini
Balai na Ilagan	Ilagan City
Balay Segundo Museum	Ramon
Balay na Santiago	Santiago City
Bonifacio Park	Ilagan City
Bonsai No Sato Park	Cauayan City
Bonsai Park	Dinapigue
Borubor Falls	Roxas
Bountiful Flower Garden	Alicia
Burmurbur Falls	Ilagan City
Cabagan-Santa Maria Landmark Bridge	Santa Maria
Cabagan Square Park	Cabagan
Camp Samal Eco-Park and Training Center	Tumauini
Camp Vizcarra	Ramon
Crocodile Sanctuary	San Mariano
Department of Agriculture - Cagayan Valley Research Center Agro Eco-Tourism Farm	Ilagan City
Desert Island	Divilacan
Dibulo Falls	Dinapigue
Diminalno Lake	Palanan
Dicangrayan Falls	Palanan
Dicotcotan Beach	Palanan
Digoyo Cave	Palanan
Digoyo Point	Palanan
Dilaknadanum — is the home Agta people, a minority group on the coast of Isabela. Features forests, beaches, rivers and small farmsteads uprivers.	Palanan
Dimanek Falls	Palanan—San Mariano boundary ridge
Dinapigue Sea Wall	Dinapigue
Disadsad Falls	Palanan
Hacienda De San Luis	Cauayan
Hagdan na Bato	Palanan
Hanging Bridge	Maconacon
Honeymoon Island	Divilacan
Ilagan Sanctuary	Ilagan City
Ilagan Japanese Tunnel	Ilagan City
Isabela Museum and Library	Ilagan City
Isabela Provincial Capitol Grounds	Ilagan City
"Isabela Thy Will Be Done" Marker	Cordon
Kagumatan Falls	Tumauini
Kuweba Danum	Tumauini
La Rizalina Orchard Garden and Farm	Reina Mercedes
La Salette Shrine — located in Balintocatoc Hills, contains life-sized statues of religious icons.	Santiago City
Maconacon Falls	Maconacon
Magat High Rise Dam — Asia's biggest dam project at the time of its construction. It serves the primary function of power generation and irrigation. Its reservoir area of 4,450 hectares has a great potential for water-based recreation like fishing, boating and water skiing, among others.	Ramon
Magoli Eco-Park and Natural Resort	Tumauini
Mammangi Park	Ilagan City
Meraki Garden	Reina Mercedes
Mororan	Tumauini
Museo de Pattaraday	Santiago City
Mushroom Center	Cauayan City
Obelisk	Jones
Pasa Dam	Ilagan City
Paseo De Paraiso Leisure Park	Burgos
Payong na Bato	Palanan
Pinzal Falls	Ilagan City
Punta Amelita Resort	Cordon
Queen Isabela II Monument and Park	Ilagan City (in front of the Isabela Provincial Capitol)
Rizal Park	Ilagan City
Sierra Madre Natural Forest Park	Isabela's eastern coast
Sinavulluan Caves	Tumauini
Spring Garden Resort	Santiago City
Santa Maria Triangular Park	Santa Maria
Santa Victoria Caves	Ilagan City
Sisangkilan Falls	Palanan
Sitio Binongbong	San Agustin
Torre de Hardin	Naguilian
Tumauini Watershed and Natural Park	Tumauini
Villa Diana Resort	Cordon
Water Impounding Dam	Roxas
Waterworld Grand Resort	Ramon
White Sand Beaches — Typical of coastal areas along the Sierra Madre mountains of Cagayan Valley.	Dinapigue, Palanan, and Divilacan coastal towns
World's Largest Butaka — It is 11 feet 4 inches high, 20 feet 8 inches long, and 9 feet 7 inches wide. It weighs 2,368 kilos and was constructed by 25 workers in 29 days.	Ilagan City

=== Churches ===
Churches in Isabela

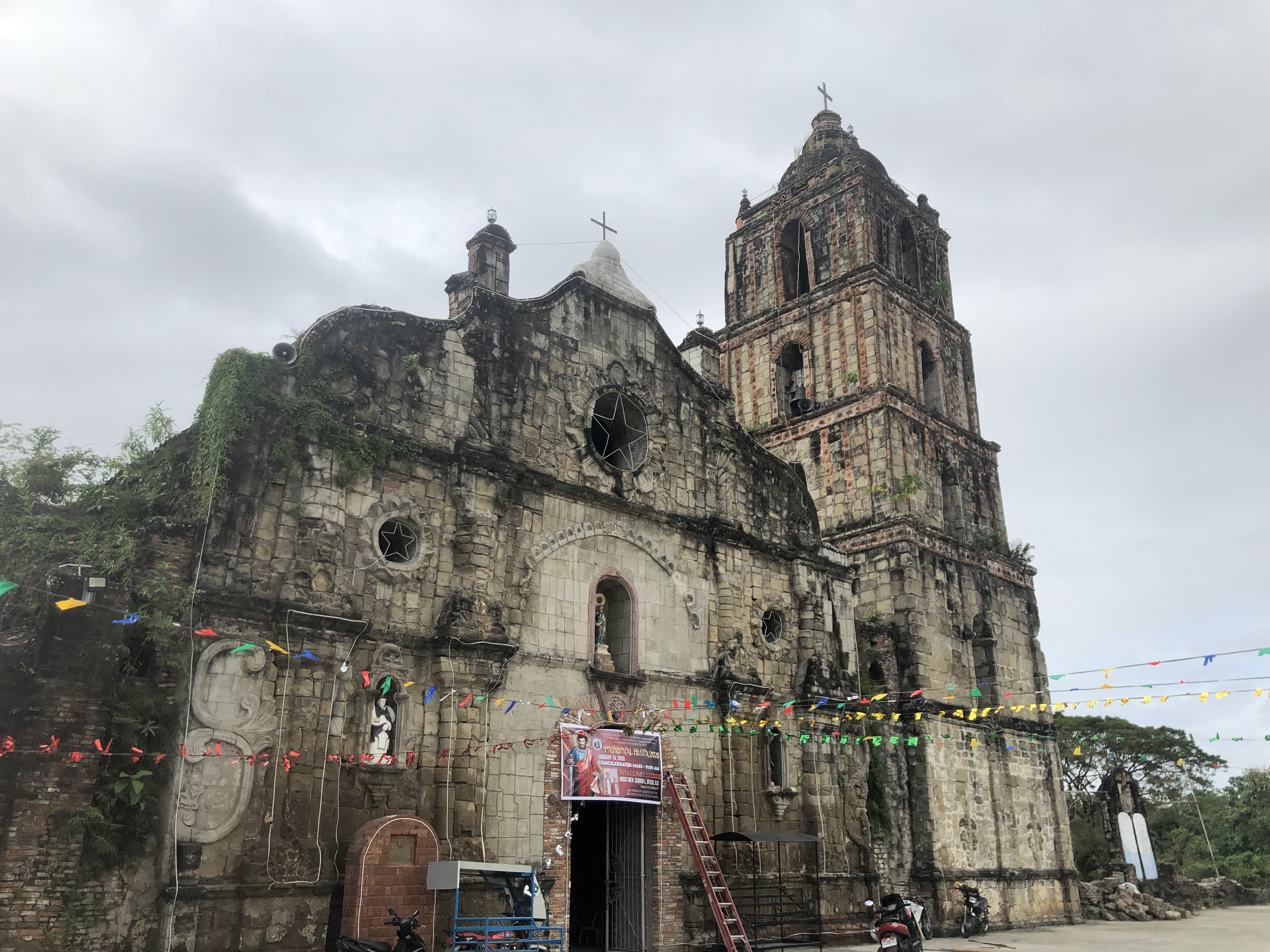
San Pablo de Cabigan Church, San Pablo, built 1624

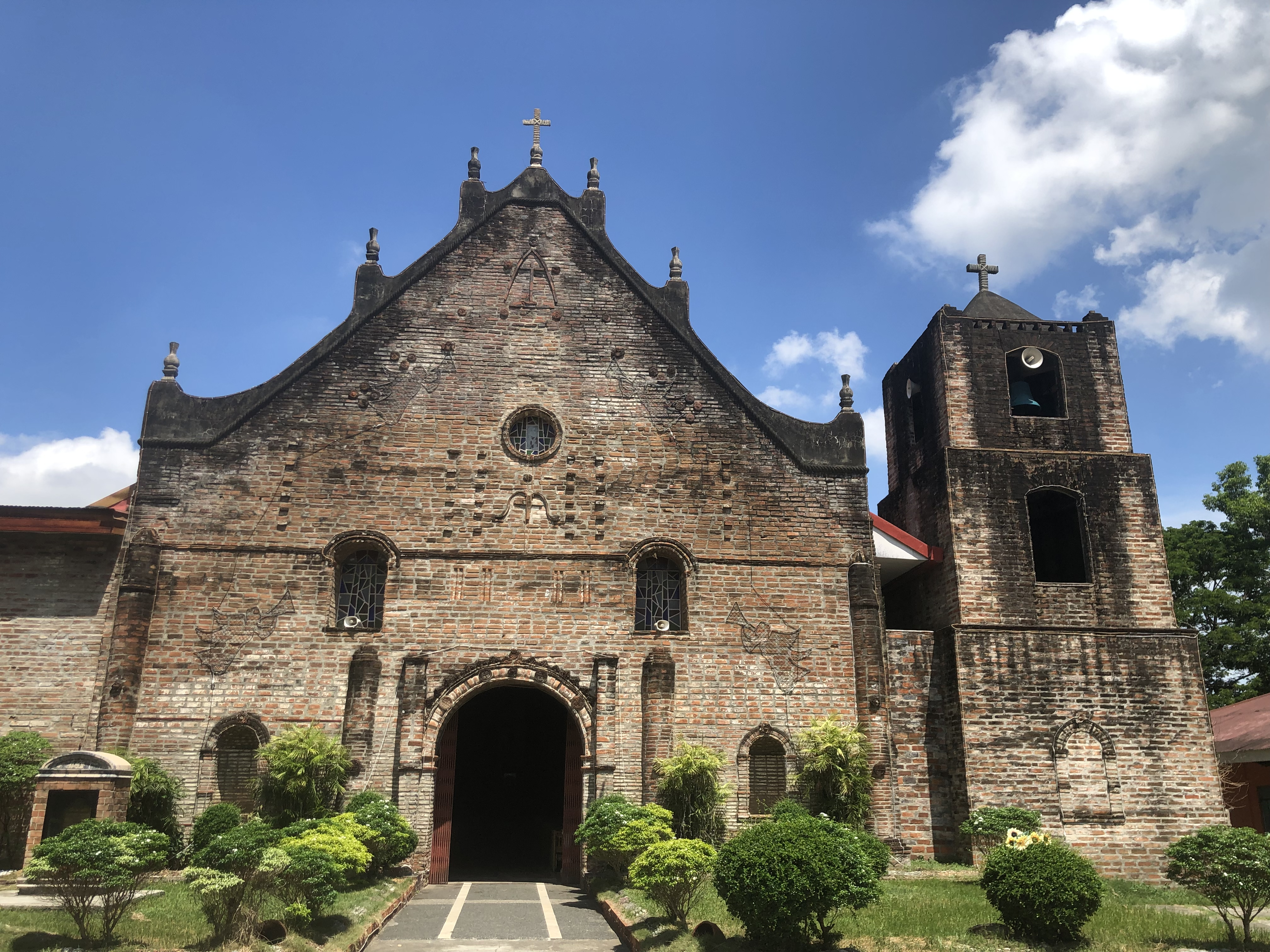
Church of Saint Rose of Lima in Gamu

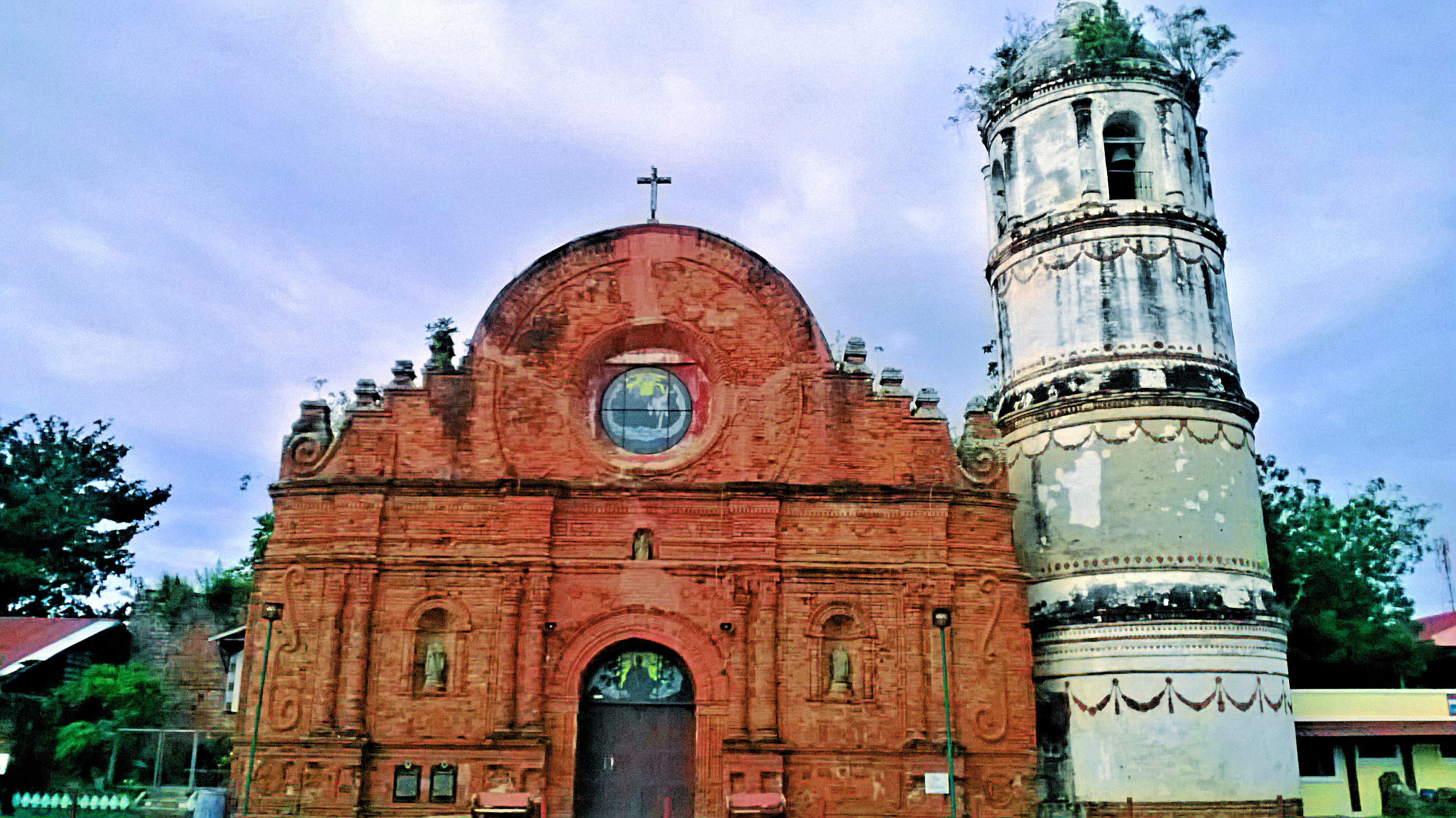
St. Mathias Parish Church in Tumauini with its wedding cake-style bell tower

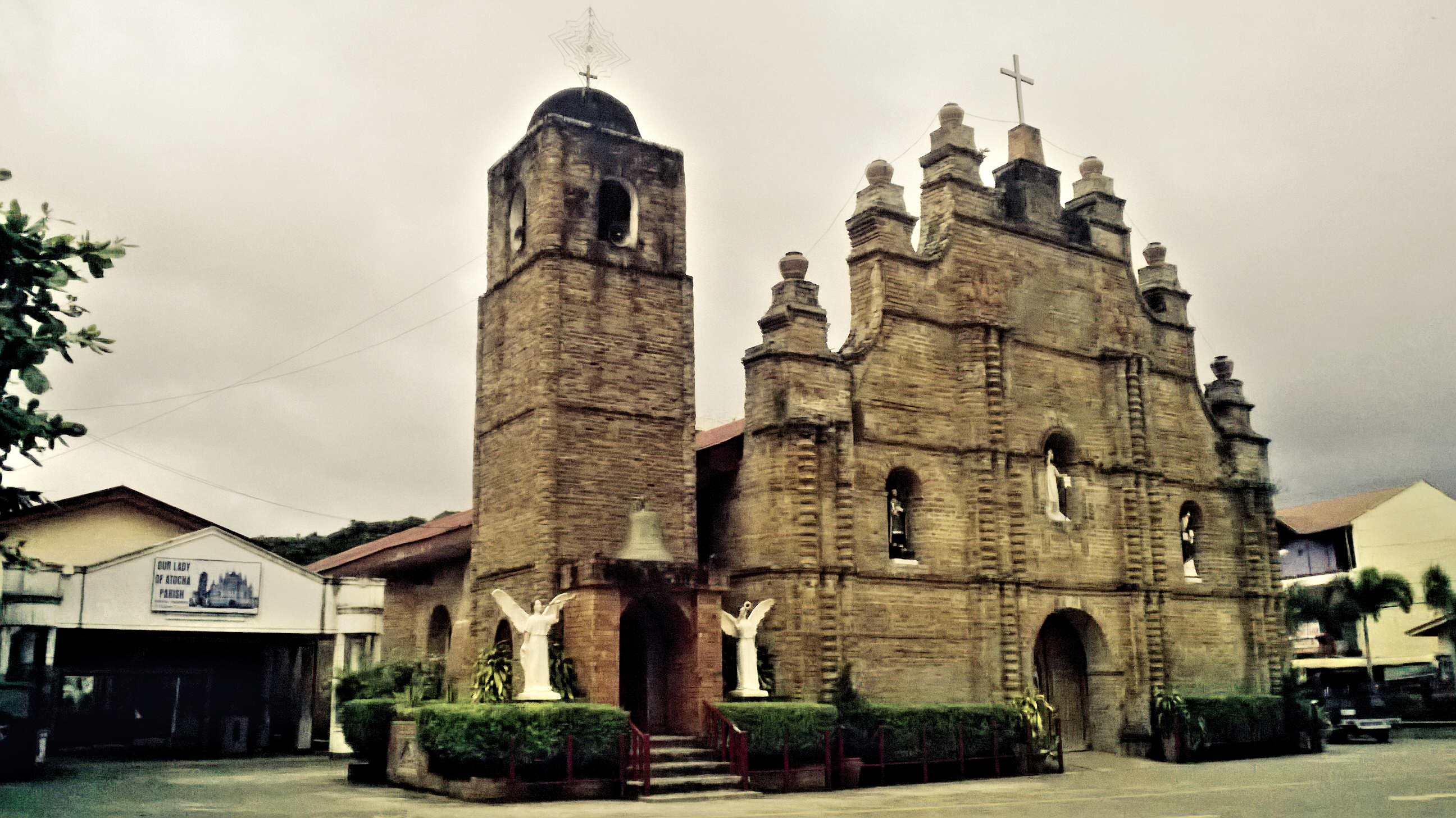
Our Lady of Atocha Church in Alicia

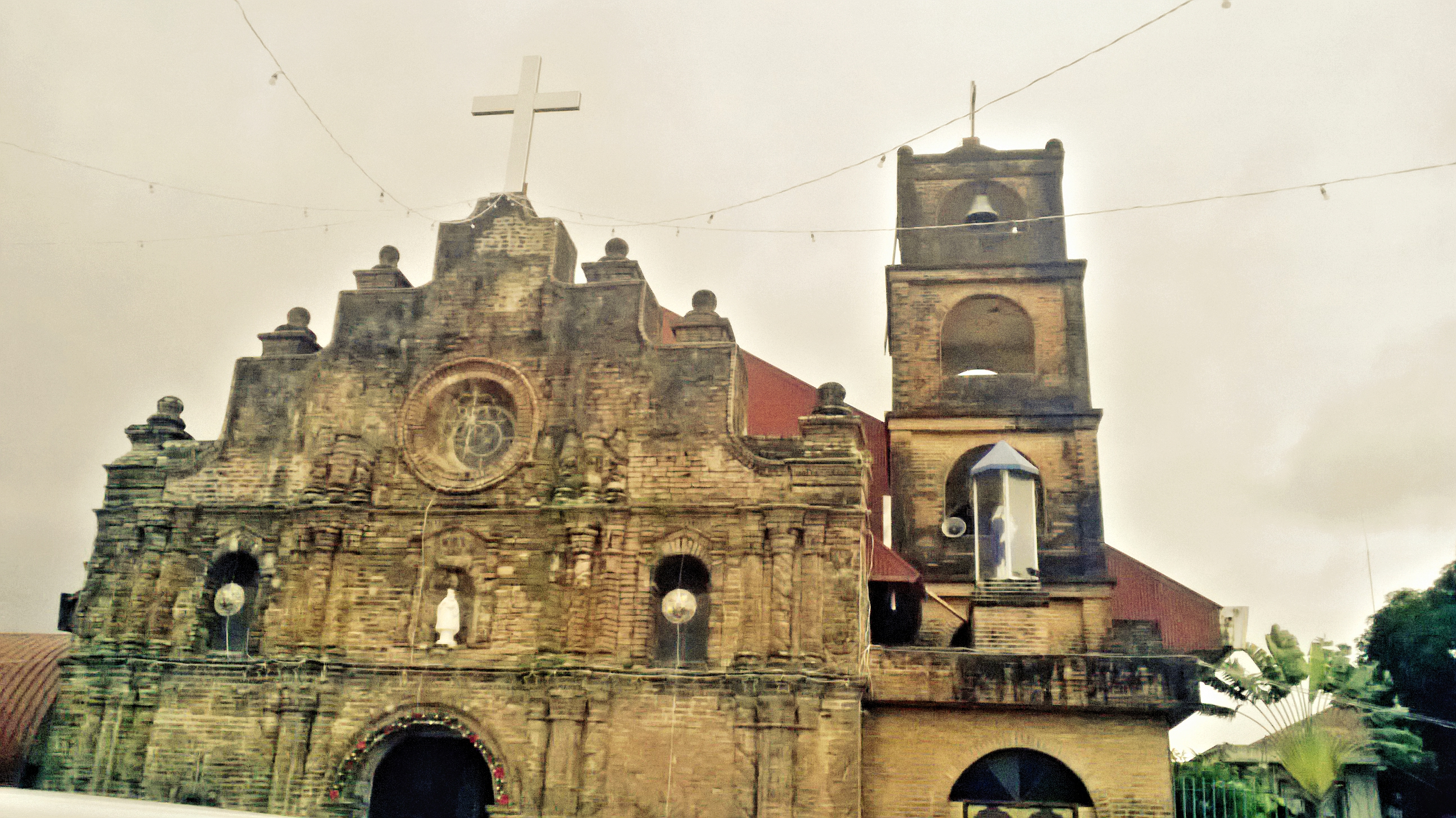
Our Lady of the Pillar Church in Cauayan

- San Pablo Church in San Pablo, the oldest town of Isabela founded by Padre de Santo Tomas on November 30, 1646 (about 210 years before Isabela was made a province). Its six-level bell tower including the circular apex is made of adobe. It is said to be the oldest in Isabela and the tallest in Cagayan Valley.
- Saint Rose of Lima Church in Gamu is known for its Spanish architectural design. Built in 1726 during the Spanish time, the church façade was made of layered bricks and stones dating back during the 17th century and considered a pilgrimage church because of its antiquity. The feast of their patron, Saint Rose of Lima is celebrated every August 23. On June 27, 2019, the National Museum of the Philippines and the National Commission for Culture and the Arts (NCCA) recognized the Saint Rose of Lima Church and its surrounding complex as an Important Cultural Property of the Philippines. The unveiling of the historical marker was done on May 12, 2023.
- Parish Church of St. Mathias in Tumauini was first built of light materials by Fray Francisco Muńez, O.P., and dedicated to Patron Saint Matthias, 1707. Separated from Cabagan and became regular parish, 1751. The church of stone with a unique cylindrical bell tower. The only of its kind in the Philippines was constructed by Father Domingo Forto in 1783 and completed, 1805. The town became the capital of Isabela for a short time in the 1890s. It is an ultra-baroque church unique for its extensive use of baked clay both for wall finishing and ornamentation and bears Chinese ancestry. Partly damage during World War II and repaired into its original form by the faithful of Tumauini. This church was declared as a National Cultural Treasure on February 24, 1989.
- Our Lady of Atocha in Alicia was originally built by the Spaniards in the 18th century. Passing by Angadanan on February 12, 1805, Fr. Manuel Mora, OP wrote that "Angadanan has a convent of bricks, though not totally finished. Its church is timber, wood, and bamboo. The number of inhabitants is 791." The church and convent as seen today in the town of Alicia, was built by Fr. Tomas Calderon, OP and inaugurated in 1849, with Fr. Francisco Gainza, OP, then vicar of Carig (now Santiago City). The church was dedicated to the Nuestra Señora de Atocha, more popularly known today as Our Lady of Atocha. The church is known for its antique Castilian architectural design and can be found along the Maharlika Highway and is accessible by land transport.
- Our Lady of the Pillar Parish Church in Cauayan was constructed by Fray Juan Prieto with the first class materials with galvanized roofing and a ceiling of bricks, dedicated to Nuestra Señora del Pilar. It had a tower which was later destroyed by a violent earthquake. Now, only the façade of the Cauayan Church remains in its original form. The original belfry is in ruins while a new nave and belfry was constructed and like the St. Mathias Church in the town of Tumauini, the facade has much interesting bas relief and portions of the bricks have numbers and symbols etched on it.
- Saint Ferdinand Parish Proto-Cathedral (Ilagan City) — This church can't be seen on the highways or the main national road as it was located in the center of the city of Ilagan. The church features very high ceilings and walls made of bricks. It was around 1696 and 1700 that Fr. Miguel Matos, OP, built the church of stone and bricks. A typhoon in 1866 destroyed the roof of the church. Desiring to make the church bigger, Fr. Pablo Almazan, OP, demolished the solid walls of the church, which, unfortunately, was never built. The walls of the church today are of modern make. It is known to house one of the oldest bells in the region. The church is dedicated to the patron saint of the Diocese of Ilagan, San Fernando. At present, it is designated as a proto-cathedral by the Roman Catholic Diocese of Ilagan. On 29 October 2023, a mass was held for the celebration of the first Holy Rosary Festival wherein the pilgrim image of the St. Ferdinand Parish - Our Lady of the Most Holy Rosary was episcopally crowned by Most Rev. David William V. Antonio, D.D., STHD., bishop of the Diocese of Ilagan. On April 22, 2024, a fire started from the roof of the 300-year old church which destroyed most of its interior.
- National Shrine of Our Lady of the Visitation of Guibang is located in town of Gamu, frequented by travelers passing by the Maharlika Highway. It comes alive every year on the month July when religious pilgrims visit to offer prayers during its feast day. The image of the Our Lady of the Visitation was canonically crowned by the Most Rev. Carmine Pocco, Papal Nuncio to the Philippines on May 26, 1973, at the former St. Ferdinand Cathedral (now St. Ferdinand Parish Proto-Cathedral) in Ilagan City. The Catholic Bishops Conference of the Philippines at its 52nd Annual Bishop's Meeting held in Tagaytay on January 24–26, 1986 have approved the petition of Miguel Purugganan, former Bishop of the Diocese of Ilagan for the Church of Our Lady of the Visitation of Guibang to be called a National Shrine.
- Saint James the Apostle Parish Church (Santiago City)
- Poor Saint Clare Monastery (Gamu)
- Cathedral of Saint Michael the Archangel (Gamu)
- Our Lady of La Salette Parish Church (Roxas)
- Saint Joseph the Worker Parish Church (Echague)
- San Isidro Labrador Parish Church (San Isidro)
- San Roque Parish Church (The only Parish Church in the province that entrusted in the Missionaries of Our Lady of La Salette) (Ramon)
- San Lorenzo Ruiz Parish Church (Burgos)

=== Festivals ===
Festival	City/town	Notes
Baka Festival	San Pablo	A survey revealing quite number of ranches in San Pablo led to the establishment of the Baka Festival. Held every 15 January, it aims to promote the local cattle industry. The festival also showcases cowboys of San Pablo displaying skills reminiscent of the American Wild West.
Balatong Festival	San Mateo	In San Mateo, mungo beans are packed with economic potential that it is referred to as "black gold". In previous years, the annual town fiesta promoted duck-related products during the Pato Festival.
Bambanti Festival	Province of Isabela	Celebrated annually by the entire province to honor the province's bountiful harvest and its emerging agro-industrial prowess. The festivity showcases the scarecrow dancing spectacles and agricultural booths. The municipalities and cities exhibit their respective culture, beliefs, traditions, origins and products. Annually, the event can drew at least 250,000 crowds all over the Cagayan Valley region, the biggest in the history of annual festivities in the region. It has become Isabela's showcase of its rich cultural heritage and pristine natural beauty. Bambanti is an iluko word for "scarecrow".
Binallay Festival	Ilagan City	Ilagueños have made the binallay a symbol of the noble characteristics they aspire to have. These include being masipag (hardworking), matiyaga (patient), matalino (intelligent), and makadiyos (God fearing). According to them, they are patient because the process of preparing binallay is tedious and involves steaming the rice cake twice, hardworking because it is difficult to prepare the rice cake (the glutinous grains are ground the traditional way, with a stone mill), intelligent because it requires a special technique to peel the wrapper off so that none of the cake is wasted and God fearing because it is a delicacy associated with the Holy Week. They regard the white cake as a representation of the body of Christ and the laro as his blood. As part of their penitence during Holy Week, Binallay is the only food that Ilagueños eat. Every May, their signature product takes center stage twice, once during the festival itself and during the Isabela Day celebrations earlier in the month when it usually has a wider audience.
Binnadangan Festival	Roxas	A yearly celebration of Pagay Festival (Palay Festival) held every July 4. The Festival was popularly known as the Araw ng Roxas Celebration but it was declared formally as Pagay Festival during the reign of Mayor Benedict Calderon. It is celebrated because of the rich agricultural bounty of Roxas, being one of the towns that produce large stocks of rice. The festival features a parade mostly of politicians and participating schools from different parts of Roxas, kuliglig contest and cooking of the biggest rice cake that was also featured in the national television. Major events include a Street Dance Competition from different schools and Palarong Bayan. Due to a conflict in the name of the festival, by which the town of Alicia celebrates the same. It was changed to Binnadangan Festival by then Mayor Harry Soller. The Binnadangan comes from an Ilocano word meaning bayanihan and was also derived from the former name of the town during the 1600s. The festival ends with a long Pyromusical.
Dikit Festival	Aurora	Known for being an agricultural municipality, Aurora annually celebrates its Dikit Festival every April 28 to 30. Dikit is an Ilocano term for "glutinous rice". The festival is celebrated to showcase this delicacy and its by-products which are bibingka, muriecos, inangit, tupig, kalamay and tinudok, among others. Farmers in Aurora plant this glutinous rice served to guests during special occasions.
Gakit Festival	Angadanan	An annual festival held at the Cagayan River. Participants of the festival offer fruits, vegetables, poultry, and livestock as thanksgiving for their abundant bounty. The practice also reminds Angadanians of their tradition of planting crops and raising poultry in their own backyards for their own consumption. The Gakit Festival also aims to show Angadanians that progress can only be achieved if they are united as one. A key detail of the festival is the hand-made bamboo rafts which are used by the participants. Each bamboo pole, if alone, has no value. It cannot float reliably on a river nor can it be used to transport anything. But if many bamboo poles are tied together as one, it can be made into a raft which can float and sail on calm or rough waters while transporting people and products.
Gawagaway-yan Festival	Cauayan	The City Fiesta and the Feast of Our lady of the Pillar are celebrated annually on April 10–13 and October 10–12 respectively. Since its conversion into a component city on March 30, 2001, the City Government started to celebrate its founding anniversary with the conduct of "Gawagaway-yan Festival" aimed to preserve the rich cultural heritage of the city. It is highlighted by street dancing, beauty contest, trade fair, cultural parade, parlor games, free concert, band exhibition and other variety shows performed by local and Manila-based talents as well.
Isabela Day	Province of Isabela	Anniversary of the establishment of the civil government of Isabela in honor of Queen Isabella II of Spain. Activities like agro-industrial trade and tourism fairs, parades, sports events are conducted to entertain visitors. Also, one of the highlights of the celebration is the Miss Isabela, an extravagant colorful pageant featuring the candidates from each town/city of the province who exemplify Isabela's youth and vibrancy. A grand fusion of fashion, music and dance with particular focus on Isabela's tourism attractions and its leader.
Kankanen Festival	Cabatuan	Celebrated in Cabatuan, showcasing native delicacies made of glutinous rice. Mayor Alma Dayrit and the Rural Improvement Club started this annual tradition in 2003 and done on the Foundation Day rites of every year.
Mammangui Festival	Ilagan City	Celebrated by Ilagueño farmers as a thanksgiving activity for a bountiful harvest, Mammangui is an Ybanag word which means to harvest corn, the primary crop in the city. Since the assumption in office of Mayor Josemarie L. Diaz, Mammangui Festival was proclaimed as the official festivity of the city. During the celebration, different activities such as parlor games, cultural and trade fairs, colorful street dance, cook fest, sports events, cheerdance competitions, float parade and many others are conducted by the city government to showcase the past to present day transition of Ilagan's rich tradition and cultural heritage. Highlights of the celebration are the annual beauty pageants namely Little Miss Mammangui, Miss Gay Mammangui and the Miss Mammangui, which is one of the most prestigious of its kind in the valley and a free concert featuring local celebrities. It is annually celebrated every May 29–31.
Mangi Festival	Tumauini	Corn (Zea mays) was one of the plants that came aboard the Spanish galleons to become one of the primary crops of the Philippines. The late National Artist for Dance, Ramon Obusan traced the origins of a traditional dance inspired by the crop to Tumauini. Thus, a corn-inspired festival seemed especially appropriate for Tumauini.
Nateng Festival	Mallig	
Cariada Festival	San Manuel	
Nuang Festival	San Agustin	The carabao (Bubalus Bubalis Carabanesis), which remains a farmer's indispensable helpmate in the fields, is honoured in the Nuang Festival of San Agustin as are the products the carabao enables farmers to produce. The town boasts of over 300 heads and farmers bring them over to the poblacion (town center) for the festival. To get the cattle there, they either guide the animals onto the ferry and keep them quiet for the short river crossing or find the shallowest point of the river, take off their clothes then lead them across. San Agustin supplies carabao milk to other towns where carabao milk candy is produced. The festival also serves as a venue for promoting other major products such as maize (Zea mays) and bananas (Musa paradisiaca L.).
Pagay Festival	Alicia	Held annually every September 28 in conjunction with the founding anniversary of the town of Alicia. It used to be called Alicia Town Festival, but was redefined and renamed to Pagay Festival in 2010 by Mayor Cecilia Claire N. Reyes. The festival aims to uphold the town's cultural identity and heritage and to promote the municipality's primary agricultural product called, pagay (Ilocano word for rice) - the municipality's major livelihood economy and trade mark. The festival is widely participated by the community which features various competitions (e.g., rice planting, harvesting, and cooking among others), street dance showdown, beauty pageant (Mutya ng Alicia), battle of the bands, and exhibits. However, the Pagay Parade is the main highlight of the festival that features decorated carabaos, various rice crop floats, and people marching with colorful costumes.
Pansi Festival	Cabagan	Pansi Festival is the official festivity of Cabagan.Pansi is an Ybanag word for pansit, a noodle dish topped with chopped karajay or lechon kawali in Tagalog. The town became noted for its well-known local product, the "Pansit Cabagan".
Pattaraday Festival	Santiago City	From pattaraday, an Ybanag word for "unity", the festival is celebrated in the city of Santiago to honor its founding anniversary, and the unity of the ethnolinguistic groups that have merged in the city to make it the melting pot of culture of Region II and contributed to the city's progress and development-unity in action. Highlighted with the presentation of the Comedia – a moro-moro dance made famous by the Spaniards to stress the power of Christian Religion over the Moorish non-believers; other activities include beauty pageant, grand batalla presentations and a grand street dancing parade and exhibition with performers from other cities, provinces and regions.
Pinilisa Festival	Jones	
Sabutan Festival	Palanan	Held every March in Palanan, the festival is named after the local name for pandan (Pandanus tectorius) which is plentiful in the town. The people of Palanan are fine craftsmen who weave dyed and natural colored strips into a variety of bags, hats, and placemats, among other items that have both traditional and contemporary designs. For the festival, the sabutan products are not only sold, these are also used as a theme and are fashioned into costumes and décor.
Sinag-Banga Festival	San Isidro	
Balamban Dance Festival	Santiago City	On the year 2014, a new festival was conceptualized by the city government to celebrate Santiago's cityhood anniversary. Balamban which means butterfly is a cultural dance of lowland Christians that originated in Santiago City. The dance depicts the graceful movement and fluttering of butterflies that throng Dariuk Hills' scented gardens. It is usually danced during wedding celebrations in Santiago.

== Notable personalities ==
- Mateo Noriel Luga — (Tumauini)
- Florence Finch — (Santiago) — Filipino-American member of the World War II resistance against the Japanese occupation of the Philippines.
- Heherson Alvarez — (Santiago) — former Senator and Secretary of Agrarian Reform
- Bojie Dy — (Cauayan) — Speaker of the House of Representatives since 2025.
- Grace Padaca — (Cauayan) — former Governor of Isabela and former Commissioner of the Commission on Elections, recipient of the Ramon Magsaysay Award for Public Service in 2008.
- Miguel Purugganan — (Ilagan) — Bishop of the Roman Catholic Diocese of Ilagan who protested the Human rights abuses of the Marcos dictatorship, and is honored at the Bantayog ng mga Bayani
- Freddie Aguilar — (Santo Tomas) — Singer/Composer
- Jejomar Binay — (Cabagan) — 13th Vice President of the Philippines
- Ruthlane Uy Asmundson — (Gamu) — Mayor of Davis, California, USA
- Silvestre Bello III — (Ilagan) — former Secretary of the Department of Labor and Employment
- Mutya Johanna Datul — (Santa Maria) — Miss Supranational 2013 and Binibining Pilipinas Supranational 2013
- Rogemar Menor — (Roxas) — PBA Player
- Ricky Calimag — (Echague) — PBA player
- Mark Telan — PBA Player
- Peter Musñgi — (Santiago) — ABS-CBN Voice Artist
- Bong Galanza — (Reina Mercedes) — Basketball player
- Sheena Mae Catacutan – (Santiago) – member of Pinoy pop group Bini and former Pinoy Big Brother: Otso housemate.
- Karina Bautista – (Santiago) – actress, former Pinoy Big Brother: Otso housemate.
- Zig Dulay - (Santiago) — independent filmmaker, TV director, producer, screen writer, film editor and cinematographer
- Jason Angangan — singer, member Smokey Mountain (band)
