= Gamu Church =

Roman Catholic church in Isabela, Philippines

- Saint Rose of Lima Parish Church
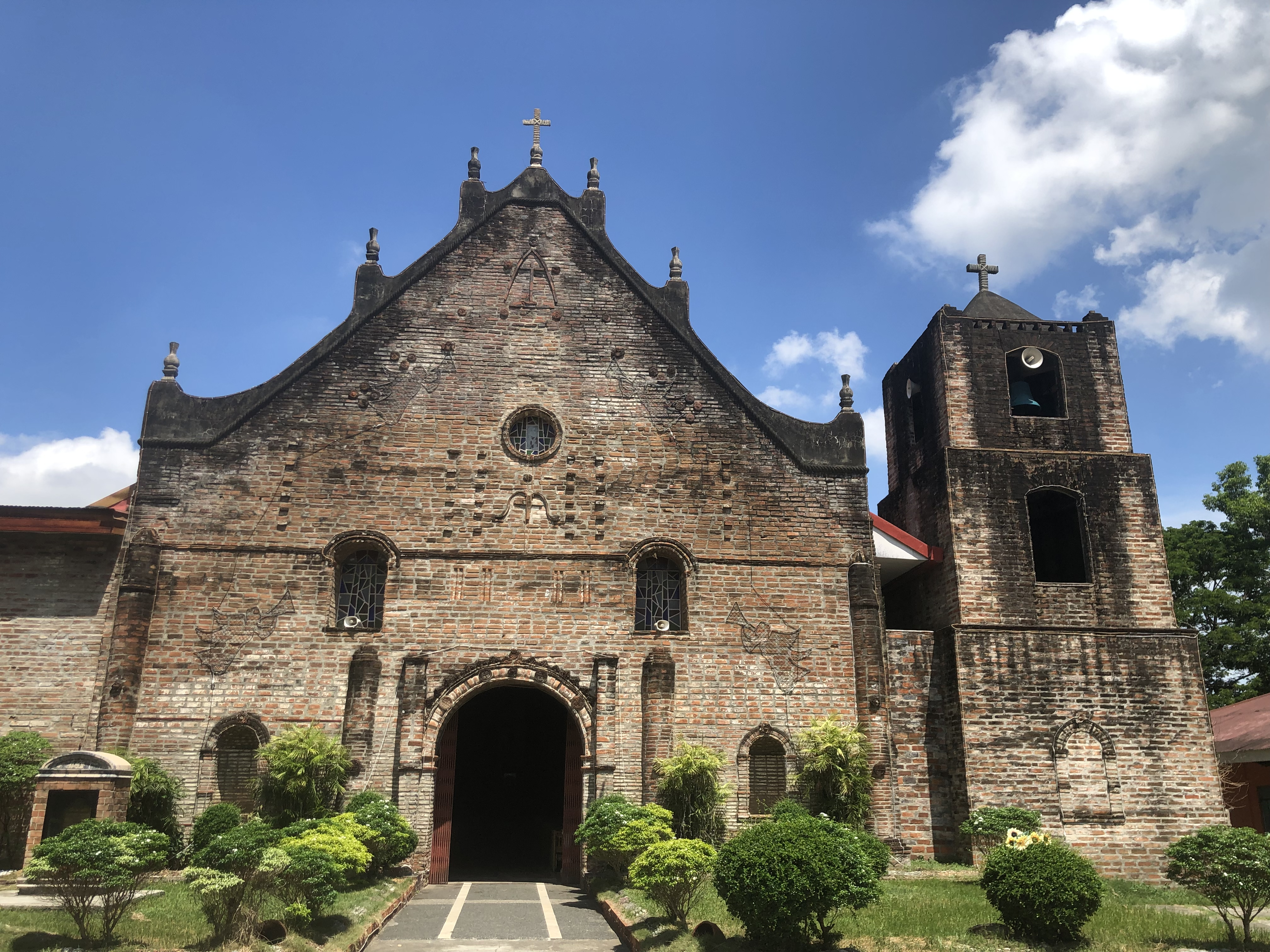
- Church facade in 2026

- Location in Luzon Location in the Philippines
- 17°2′49″N 121°49′57″E
- Location: Gamu, Isabela
- Country: Philippines
- Denomination: Roman Catholic

History
- Status: Parish church
- Dedication: Rose of Lima

Architecture
- Functional status: Active
- Heritage designation: National Cultural Treasure
- Designated: 2019
- Architectural type: Church building
- Style: Baroque
- Completed: 18th century

Administration
- Diocese: Ilagan

Saint Rose of Lima Parish Church, commonly known as Gamu Church, is a Roman Catholic church located in Gamu, Isabela, Philippines. It is under the jurisdiction of the Diocese of Ilagan.

The church was constructed around 1750 by Martin Fernández, a priest who also made the town planning for Gamu. The Baroque-styled church's distinct feature is its facade's pointed towers. The church has a life-size image of the Peruvian nun Rose of Lima, the patron saint of embroidery, gardening, and cultivation of blooming flowers.

The National Museum of the Philippines declared the church as a national cultural property in 2019.

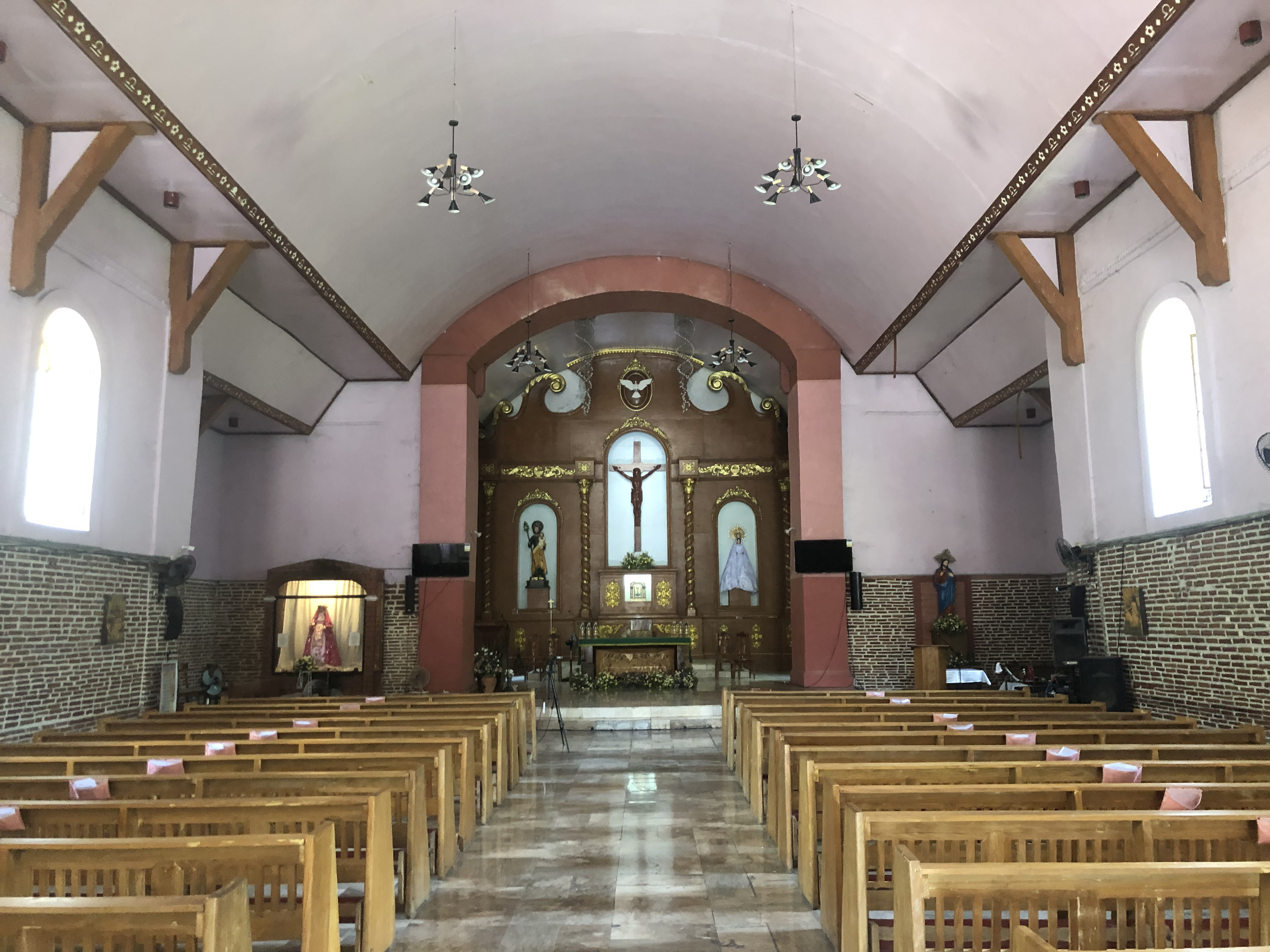
Interior of Gamu Church in June 2026
