= 2022 Isabela local elections =

2022 Isabela gubernatorial election
- May 9, 2022
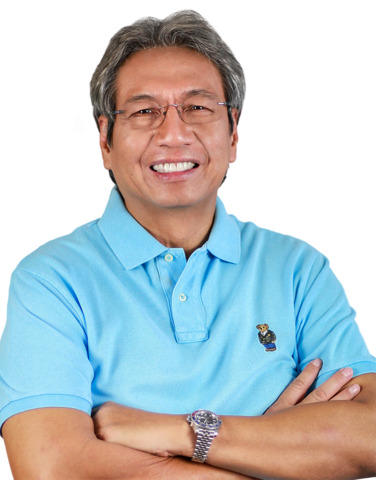
Nominee	Rodolfo Albano III
Party	PDP–Laban
Running mate	Bojie Dy
Popular vote	673,774
Percentage	95.17
Governor before election
Rodolfo Albano III
PDP–Laban
Elected Governor
Rodolfo Albano III
PDP–Laban

Local elections were held in the province of Isabela on May 9, 2022, as part of the 2022 Philippine general election. Voters selected candidates for all local positions: a mayor, vice-mayor and councilors, as well as members of the Sangguniang Panlalawigan, the governor, vice-governor and for the six districts of Isabela for board members and congress.

The province of Isabela is considered by Comelec as one of the vote-rich provinces in the Philippines for having 1,112,858 voters in the 2022 national and local elections.

== Gubernatorial elections ==
=== Governor ===
Incumbent Governor Rodolfo Albano III is running for his second consecutive term. His opponents are Glorieta Almazan and Romeo Carlos. Albano remains as governor of Isabela.

Isabela gubernatorial election
Party	Candidate	Votes	%
PDP–Laban	Rodolfo Albano III	673,774	95.17%
Independent	Glorieta Almazan	26,115	3.69%
Independent	Romeo Carlos	8,101	1.14%
Total votes		707,990	100.00%

=== Vice governor ===
Incumbent Faustino Dy III is running for reelection.

Isabela vice gubernatorial election
Party	Candidate	Votes	%
PDP–Laban	Faustino "Bojie" Dy III	632,938	100.00%
Total votes		632,938	100.00%

== Board members elections ==
Party	Votes	%	Seats
Lakas–CMD	236,679	25.23	2
Aksyon Demokratiko	164,764	17.56	2
Nationalist People's Coalition	139,867	14.91	2
PDP–Laban	137,231	14.63	3
Laban ng Demokratikong Pilipino	72,800	7.76	1
Nacionalista Party	57,289	6.11	1
Partido Federal ng Pilipinas	51,470	5.49	1
Kilusang Bagong Lipunan	30,972	3.30	–
Liberal Party	18,069	1.93	–
Reporma	9,213	0.98	–
Independent	19,821	2.11	–
Ex officio seats			3
Total	938,175	100.00	15

=== 1st District ===
- City: Ilagan
- Municipalities: Cabagan, Delfin Albano, Divilacan, Maconacon, San Pablo, Santa Maria, Santo Tomas, Tumauini
- Population (2020): 399,196
- Electorate (2022):

Voters of the district will elect two board members at-large.

2022 Provincial Board Election in 1st District of Isabela
Party	Candidate	Votes	%
Lakas	Delfinito Emmanuel "MM" Albano	152,807	16.56%
Lakas	Emmanuel Joselito "Jon" Anes	83,872	9.09%
Independent	Marcelo Artizuela Sr.	8,288	0.90%
PROMDI	Celso Balayan	5,932	0.64%
Total votes		250,899	27.19%

=== 2nd District ===
- Municipalities: Benito Soliven, Gamu, Naguilian, Palanan, Reina Mercedes, San Mariano
- Population (2020): 199,903
- Electorate (2022):

Voters of the district will elect two board members at-large.

2022 Provincial Board Election in 2nd District of Isabela
Party	Candidate	Votes	%
Aksyon	Ed Christian Go	78,685	8.53%
Nacionalista	Edgar Capuchino	57,289	6.21%
KBL	Emmanuel "Manny" Pua	3,208	0.35%
KBL	Romarico Ramirez	2,077	0.23%
Total votes		141,252	15.32%

=== 3rd District ===
- Municipalities: Alicia, Angadanan, Cabatuan, Ramon, San Mateo
- Population (2020): 282,027
- Electorate (2022):

Voters of the district will elect two board members at-large.

2022 Provincial Board Election in 3rd District of Isabela
Party	Candidate	Votes	%
NPC	Mary Grace Arreola	71,599	7.76%
NPC	Ramon Juan "Ramon RJ" Reyes Jr.	68,268	7.40%
Aksyon	Vicente "Vic" Siquian Jr.	32,967	3.57%
Aksyon	Erlinda "Linda" Villar	9,999	1.08%
Total votes		182,833	19.81%

=== 4th District ===
- City: Santiago (Note: Independent component city since July 4, 1994. Independent from the province and does not vote for provincial officials by virtue of Republic Act No. 7720. Its electorates vote with Isabela for congressional representation only.)
- Municipalities: Cordon, Dinapigue, Jones, San Agustin
- Population (2020): 268,602
- Electorate (2022):

Voters of the district will elect two board members at-large.

2022 Provincial Board Election in 4th District of Isabela
Party	Candidate	Votes	%
PDP–Laban	Clifford Raspado	34,784	3.77%
PDP–Laban	Victor Dy	25,610	2.78%
NPC	Christian Vincent Neville "Vinchy" Aggabao	17,555	1.90%
NPC	Amador "Amado" Vallejo Jr.	12,399	1.34%
Reporma	Hipolito "Lito" Salatan	9,213	1.00%
Total votes		99,561	10.79%

=== 5th District ===
- Municipalities: Aurora, Burgos, Luna, Mallig, Quezon, Quirino, Roxas, San Manuel
- Population (2020): 267,550
- Electorate (2022):

Voters of the district will elect two board members at-large.

2022 Provincial Board Election in 5th District of Isabela
Party	Candidate	Votes	%
LDP	Manuel Faustino "King" Dy	72,800	7.89%
PFP	Edward Isidro	51,470	5.58%
KBL	Renen Paraguison	25,687	2.78%
Total votes		150,227	16.25%

=== 6th District ===
- City: Cauayan
- Municipalities: Echague, San Guillermo, San Isidro
- Population (2020): 279,772
- Electorate (2022):

Voters of the district will elect two board members at-large.

2022 Provincial Board Election in 6th District of Isabela
Party	Candidate	Votes	%
Aksyon	Marco Paolo "Arco" Meris	86,079	9.33%
PDP–Laban	Amador Gaffud Jr.	76,837	8.33%
PDP–Laban	Atty. Ralph Maloloyon	28,660	3.11%
Liberal	Cherryl Arni "Atty. Che" Macutay-Alviar	18,069	1.96%
Independent	Abraham "Abe" Lim	11,533	1.25%
Total votes		221,178	23.98%

== Congressional elections ==
=== 1st District ===
2022 Philippine House of Representatives election in Isabela's 1st District
Party	Candidate	Votes	%
Lakas	Antonio "Tonypet" Albano	176,265	97.60%
Independent	Stephen Soliven	4,337	2.40%
Total votes		180,602	100.00%

=== 2nd District ===
2022 Philippine House of Representatives election in Isabela's 2nd District
Party	Candidate	Votes	%
Nacionalista	Ed Christopher Go	80,841	85.35%
Independent	Harold Respicio	12,711	13.42%
KBL	Faustino Reyes	588	0.62%
PGRP	Elizabeth Magora	581	0.61%
Total votes		94,721	100.00%

=== 3rd District ===
2022 Philippine House of Representatives election in Isabela's 3rd District
Party	Candidate	Votes	%
NPC	Ian Paul Dy	113,838	100.00%
Total votes		113,838	100.00%

=== 4th District ===
2022 Philippine House of Representatives election in Isabela's 4th District
Party	Candidate	Votes	%
PDP–Laban	Joseph Tan	106,651	74.90%
PDDS	Jeanybel "Jeany" Coquilla	30,392	21.34%
NPC	Lucas Florentino	2,855	2.01%
Reporma	Ramon "Monching" Espiritu	1,421	1.00%
Independent	Ellenday "Ellen" Gabriel	1,070	0.75%
Total votes		142,392	100.00%

=== 5th District ===
2022 Philippine House of Representatives election in Isabela's 5th District
Party	Candidate	Votes	%
NPC	Faustino Michael "Mike" Dy III	79,415	66.29%
PDP–Laban	Kristin Bernadette Uy	38,112	31.81%
PDP–Laban	Gilbert San Pedro	2,272	1.90%
Total votes		119,799	100.00%

=== 6th District ===
Armando Velasco was a former election commissioner and he is running for congressional seat for this election.

2022 Philippine House of Representatives election in Isabela's 6th District
Party	Candidate	Votes	%
PDP–Laban	Faustino "Inno" Dy V	121,381	90.83%
PROMDI	Armando Velasco	12,255	9.17%
Total votes		133,636	100.00%

== City elections ==
=== Cauayan ===
As of May 13, 2022, 100.00% precincts have reported.

Cauayan Mayoralty Elections
Party	Candidate	Votes	%
NPC	Dy, Caesar Jr.	44,236	61.73%
PROMDI	Dy, Bill	27,424	38.27%
Invalid or blank votes		0	0.00%
Total votes		71,660	100.00%

Cauayan Vice Mayoralty Election
Party	Candidate	Votes	%
Reporma	Dalin, Leoncio Jr.	59,110	100.00%
Invalid or blank votes		0	0.00%
Total votes		59,110	100.00%

2022 Cauayan City Council Elections
Party	Candidate	Votes	%
NPC	Atienza, Egay	48,117	62.63%
NPC	Uy, Cynthia	48,063	62.56%
NPC	Uy, Balong	44,495	57.91%
NPC	Asirit, Balong Asirit	44,253	57.60%
NPC	De Luna, Edgar	43,986	57.25%
NPC	Galutera, Garry	43,597	56.74%
NPC	Mallillin, Uncle Porong	40,498	52.71%
NPC	Mauricio, Paul	39,704	51.68%
Reporma	Delmendo, Miko	37,964	49.41%
NPC	Maximo, Bagnos Jr.	39,704	51.68%
Independent	De Joya, Marc	33,890	44.11%
PDP–Laban	Foronda, Salcedo	21,141	27.52%
PDP–Laban	Ancheta, Felix	20,580	26.79%
Independent	Arcega, Ernesto Jr.	13,661	17.78%
PROMDI	Lelina, Orly	7,016	9.13%
PROMDI	Garcia, Pilar	6,896	8.98%
Independent	Condat, Eduardo	4,896	6.37%
Total votes			

=== Ilagan ===
As of May 13, 2022, 100.00% precincts have reported. Both Diaz and Bello are unopposed in the local elections for mayoralty and vice mayoralty positions respectively.

Ilagan Mayoralty Elections
Party	Candidate	Votes	%
Nacionalista	Diaz, Josemarie "Jay"	70,713	100.00%
Invalid or blank votes		0.00	0.00%
Total votes		70,713	100.00%

Ilagan Vice Mayoralty Election
Party	Candidate	Votes	%
Nacionalista	Bello, Kiryll "Kit"	66,576	100.00%
Invalid or blank votes		0	0.00%
Total votes		66,576	100.00%

2022 Ilagan City Council Elections
Party	Candidate	Votes	%
Nacionalista	Diaz, Jay Eveson "Jayve"	67,646	81.17%
Nacionalista	Uy, Jessamyn	50,813	60.97%
Nacionalista	Villanueva, Rachel	48,316	57.97%
Nacionalista	Olalia, Harold	45,442	54.53%
Nacionalista	Montereal, Jun	45,404	54.48%
Nacionalista	Bringas, Lillian	44,176	53.01%
Nacionalista	Ramos, Joey	42,518	51.02%
Nacionalista	Tugade, Rolando	42,319	50.78%
Nacionalista	Ballesteros, Rommel	41,024	49.22%
Nacionalista	Mata, Daniel Joseph	38,963	46.38%
PROMDI	Fiel, Criselda	17,963	21.55%
Total votes			

=== Santiago ===
As of May 13, 2022, 100.00% precincts have reported. Supporters of Miranda protest the election results claiming that 4,255 ballots were not included, vote-buying and other offenses.

Santiago Mayoralty Elections
Party	Candidate	Votes	%
PDP–Laban	Tan, Alyssa Sheena	43,416	48.97%
PROMDI	Miranda, Joseph "Otep"	42,631	48.08%
Independent	Cornel, Maui	1,704	1.92%
Independent	Roque, Nap	583	0.66%
PFP	Miguel, Walter Jay	124	0.14%
Independent	Ayson, Christopher	60	0.07%
Independent	Licudine, Mar22	57	0.06%
Lakas	Tesoro, Genalyn	52	0.06%
Independent	Valdez, Arthur	37	0.04%
Invalid or blank votes		0.00	0.00%
Total votes		88,664	100.00%

Santiago Vice Mayoralty Election
Party	Candidate	Votes	%
PDP–Laban	Abaya, Alvin	42,032	49.04%
Reporma	Navarro, Amelita	34,558	40.32%
PROMDI	Navarro, Soc	7,143	8.33%
PDDS	Bartolome, Bonifacio	1,448	1.69%
Independent	Lim, Angelo	534	0.62%
Invalid or blank votes		0	0.00%
Total votes		85,715	100.00%

2022 Santiago City Council Elections
Party	Candidate	Votes	%
Liberal	Alvarez-Reyes, Arlene	49,895	54.49%
PDP–Laban	De Jesus, Paul	47,617	52.00%
PDP–Laban	Turingan, Resie	47,009	51.34%
PDP–Laban	Sable, Cassandra Eunice	46,889	51.21%
PDP–Laban	Bautista, Kc	44,318	48.40%
PDP–Laban	Tan, Jamayne	42,560	46.48%
Aksyon	Miranda, Jigs	40,987	44.76%
Lakas	Chan, Olan	35,883	39.19%
Liberal	Cabucana, Jun	35,197	38.44%
PDP–Laban	Miguel, Sherman	34,901	38.12%
NPC	Marrero, Aysen	34,015	37.15%
Aksyon	Chai, Benzi	33,724	36.83%
PDP–Laban	Siquian, Ginoabaya	32,095	35.05%
Lakas	Posidio, Lyka	23,377	25.53%
Reporma	Navarro, Maurice	22,925	25.04%
PDP–Laban	Castillo, Aga	16,935	18.49%
PROMDI	Buck, Tyrone	13,617	14.87%
Independent	Dumag, Nixon	13,139	14.35%
Akbayan	Sotto, Mark	12,586	13.75%
NPC	Almazan, Philip	11,465	12.52%
NPC	Chua, Honey	10,626	11.60%
NPC	Quines, Russell	9,669	10.56%
Independent	Sarangaya, Monching	8,029	8.77%
Independent	Bernabe, Tabachingching	7,886	8.61%
NPC	Taguinod, Martin Hubert	7,183	7.84%
Independent	Lim Yuen, Harrison Mark	5,514	6.02%
PDDS	Manubay, Loy	3,131	3.42%
PFP	Jose, Gene	2,634	2.88%
Independent	Dacanay, Rolando	1,898	2.07%
PDDS	Lood, Percy	654	0.71%
Total votes			

== Municipal elections ==
=== Alicia ===
As of May 13, 2022, 100.00% precincts have reported.

Alicia Mayoralty Elections
Party	Candidate	Votes	%
NPC	Alejandro, Joel	23,176	61.98%
Aksyon	Lim, Rommel	14,215	38.02%
Invalid or blank votes		0.00	0.00%
Total votes		37,391	100.00%

Alicia Vice Mayoralty Elections
Party	Candidate	Votes	%
NPC	Velasco, Andy Bonn	18,611	51.56%
Aksyon	Abuan, Ric	17,487	48.44%
Invalid or blank votes		0	0.00%
Total votes		36,098	100.00%

2022 Alicia Municipal Council Elections
Party	Candidate	Votes	%
NPC	Go, Miko	25,794	64.07%
NPC	Paguila, Dra Mila	25,358	62.98%
NPC	Reyes, Gege	22,341	55.49%
NPC	Co, Dj	21,330	52.98%
NPC	Mendoza, Ron	20,937	52.00%
NPC	Alejandro, Jeff	19,077	47.38%
NPC	Bumatay, Victon	19,023	47.25%
NPC	Mapili, Maxell	18,356	45.59%
Aksyon	Simon, Placido Jr.	14,499	36.01%
Aksyon	Bambico, Priva	10,289	25.56%
Aksyon	Agustin, John Mark	8,054	20.00%
Aksyon	Valencia, Niño	7,985	19.83%
Aksyon	Pascua, Edilford	7,541	18.73%
Aksyon	Miguel, Johnson	7,283	18.09%
Total votes			

=== Angadanan ===
As of May 13, 2022, 100.00% precincts have reported.

Angadanan Mayoralty Elections
Party	Candidate	Votes	%
NPC	Panganiban, Joelle	20,789	95.01%
PDP–Laban	Siquian, Long	432	1.97%
Aksyon	Siquian, Pong	660	3.02%
Invalid or blank votes		0	0.00%
Total votes		21,881	100.00%

Angadanan Vice Mayoralty Elections
Party	Candidate	Votes	%
PFP	Panganiban, Rey	15,802	72.35%
Aksyon	Juan, Noel	6,038	27.65%
Invalid or blank votes			
Total votes		21,840	100.00%

2022 Angadanan Municipal Council Elections
Party	Candidate	Votes	%
NPC	Siquian, Dong	16,517	65.67%
Lakas	Lopez, Joy	15,235	60.57%
PFP	Rivera, Jimmy	14,669	58.32%
NPC	Go, Marit	14,211	56.50%
NPC	Valdez, Marcelo	13,475	53.57%
NPC	Gomez, Porfirio	13,418	53.35%
PFP	Paggao, Reymundo Jr.	13,241	52.64%
Lakas	Cabasag, Rolly	13,166	52.34%
NPC	Siquian, Dong	5,679	22.58%
Aksyon	Tejo, Rolly	4,079	16.22%
Total votes			

=== Aurora ===
As of May 13, 2022, 77.27% precincts have reported.

Aurora Mayoralty Elections
Party	Candidate	Votes	%
NPC	Uy, Niño	13,829	88.57%
PDP–Laban	Nitura, Mike	1,693	10.84%
Independent	Sadiwa, Dante	91	0.58%
Invalid or blank votes		0	0.00%
Total votes		15,613	100.00%

Aurora Vice Mayoralty Elections
Party	Candidate	Votes	%
NPC	Martin, Melvin	11,729	87.27%
WPP	Lagasca, Edgar	1,711	12.73%
Invalid or blank votes		0	0.00%
Total votes		13,440	100.00%

2022 Aurora Municipal Council Elections
Party	Candidate	Votes	%
Independent	Alivia, Ompong	9,858	58.16%
Aksyon	Torio, Romeo	9,415	55.55%
NPC	Datu, Elizabeth	8,860	52.27%
NPC	Taguinod, Venelo	8,689	51.27%
NPC	Rivera, Jun	8,429	49.73%
NPC	Cacal, Terio	7,992	47.15%
NPC	Pascua, Alejandrino	6,808	40.17%
PFP	Duldulao, Damian	6,615	39.03%
PFP	Duque, Cris	6,559	38.70%
WPP	Nicolas, Alfredo	5,638	33.26%
Independent	Samson, Jessie	4,636	27.35%
WPP	Nitura, Gilbert	2,550	15.05%
PDP–Laban	Albano, John Mark	2,186	12.90%
PDP–Laban	Marquez, Armando	1,916	11.30%
PDP–Laban	Tinio, Efren Jr.	1,766	10.42%
PDP–Laban	Garonia, Jonjon	1,215	7.17%
WPP	Valdez, Alih	1,026	6.05%
WPP	Laddit, Elvira	971	5.73%
Total votes			

=== Benito Soliven ===
As of May 13, 2022, 100.00% precincts have reported.

Benito Soliven Mayoralty Elections
Party	Candidate	Votes	%
Nacionalista	Lungan, Robert	11,851	78.71%
KBL	Casas, Jhun	3,206	21.29%
Invalid or blank votes		0	0.00%
Total votes		15,057	100.00%

Benito Soliven Vice Mayoralty Elections
Party	Candidate	Votes	%
Nacionalista	Azur, JP	13,143	100.00%
Invalid or blank votes		0.00	0.00%
Total votes		13,143	100.00%

2022 Benito Soliven Municipal Council Elections
Party	Candidate	Votes	%
Aksyon	Azur, Rose Jane	12,991	78.36%
Nacionalista	Lungan, Roxan	10,470	63.15%
Nacionalista	Abu, Ejay	10,428	62.90%
Nacionalista	Rinion, Rommel	9,296	56.07%
Nacionalista	Viernes, Mado	8,873	53.52%
PDP–Laban	Ancheta, Felix	3,635	21.93%
Nacionalista	Carreon, Jade	8,220	49.58%
Aksyon	Dela Cruz, Nanding	8,048	48.54%
KBL	Domingo, Jun	6,968	42.03%
Nacionalista	Ancheta, Marshal	8,814	53.16%
KBL	Carolino, Lito	2,813	16.97%
KBL	Pacariem, Dennis	2,775	16.74%
PDP–Laban	Sanglay, Benjamin	2,494	15.04%
KBL	Valdez, Gerald	2,330	14.05%
Independent	Pua, Bong	1,117	6.74%
PDP–Laban	Barnachea, Rodrigo	466	2.81%
Total votes			

=== Burgos ===
As of May 13, 2022, 100.00% precincts have reported.

Burgos Mayoralty Elections
Party	Candidate	Votes	%
NPC	Uy, Isis Dominique	10,694	100.00%
Invalid or blank votes		0	0.00%
Total votes		10,694	100.00%

Burgos Vice Mayoralty Elections
Party	Candidate	Votes	%
NPC	Gragasin, Ruben	9,831	75.48%
Independent	Gamayon, Roderick	2,424	18.61%
Independent	Reglos, Samuel	770	5.91%
Invalid or blank votes		0	0.00%
Total votes		13,025	100.00

2022 Burgos Municipal Council Elections
Party	Candidate	Votes	%
Independent	Abaya, Elmer	8,251	58.91%
Independent	Tegui, Ruben	7,273	51.92%
NPC	Espejo, Matvee	7,012	50.06%
PFP	Agtarap, Martin	6,098	43.54%
NPC	Lopez, Emmanuel	5,964	42.58%
NPC	Reglos, Myrna	4,903	35.00%
Independent	Guillermo, Edgardo	4,390	31.34%
Aksyon	Agliam, Alex	4,381	31.28%
NPC	Dela Cruz, Fred	4,221	30.13%
KBL	Anagaran, Hector Jr.	3,549	25.34%
Independent	Dallego, Rex	3,456	24.67%
NPC	Lintao, Teofisto Jr.	3,441	24.57%
Independent	Pacol, Elclarie John	3,341	23.85%
Independent	Abaya, Novelito	3,036	21.67%
Lakas	Domingo, Jonjon	2,733	19.51%
Independent	Lajorda, Roldan	2,471	17.64%
Independent	Lopez, Apolinario	2,280	16.28%
Independent	Aglibot, Maximino	1,552	11.08%
Independent	Mata, Timoteo	480	3.43%
Independent	Salvador, Danilo	250	1.78%
Total votes			

=== Cabagan ===
As of May 13, 2022, 100.00% precincts have reported.

Cabagan Mayoralty Elections
Party	Candidate	Votes	%
PDP–Laban	Mamauag, Christopher	22,328	100.00%
Invalid or blank votes		0	0.00%
Total votes		22,328	100.00%

Cabagan Vice Mayoralty Elections
Party	Candidate	Votes	%
PDP–Laban	Masigan, Ovie	21,344	91.88%
Independent	Castro, Napoleon	1,886	8.12%
Invalid or blank votes		0	0.00%
Total votes		23,230	100.00%

2022 Cabagan Municipal Council Elections
Party	Candidate	Votes	%
Independent	Bagunu, Delfin	17,158	62.40%
Independent	Fugaban, Ferdinand	15,482	56.31%
NUP	Guingab, Francis	13,733	49.95%
Independent	Marayag, Feny	13,260	48.23%
Lakas	Acorda, Ogga	10,767	39.16%
NUP	Mamauag, Bonjing	10,081	36.66%
Aksyon	Ramos, Boy	10,001	36.37%
Lakas	Zipagan, Toto	9,228	33.56%
Lakas	Zipagan, Joyjoy	9,118	33.16%
Independent	Delgado, Rocco	8,891	32.34%
Aksyon	Totto, George	7,964	28.01%
Lakas	Mamauag, Hector	7,703	28.01%
Independent	Gatan, Venus	7,358	26.76%
Independent	Aggabao, Kenneth	7,202	26.76%
Independent	Buraga, Edward	6,787	24.68%
Independent	Guingab, Ritchel	1,686	6.13%
Lakas	Baricaua, Onie	3,470	12.62%
Independent	Fronda, Bing	3,138	11.41%
Independent	Frogoso, Dexson	1,965	7.15%
Independent	Guiyab, Teodoro	6,682	24.30%
Independent	Paguirigan, Maria Teresa	1,596	5.80%
Independent	Bucag, Francisco	1,434	5.22%
Total votes			

=== Cabatuan ===
As of May 13, 2022, 100.00% precincts have reported.

Cabatuan Mayoralty Elections
Party	Candidate	Votes	%
Independent	Garcia, Panyong	10,757	52.40%
NUP	Uy, Rowena Rachelle	9,772	47.60%
Invalid or blank votes		0	0.00%
Total votes		20,529	100.00%

Cabatuan Vice Mayoralty Elections
Party	Candidate	Votes	%
NUP	Uy, Charlton	12,704	100.00%
Invalid or blank votes		0	0.00%
Total votes		12,704	100.00%

2022 Cabatuan Municipal Council Elections
Party	Candidate	Votes	%
NUP	Dy, Benjamin Isabelo	16,311	74.40%
NUP	Alivia, Andy	12,556	57.28%
NUP	Britanico, Randy	12,461	56.84%
NUP	Velasco, Rolando	11,969	54.60%
WPP	Dayrit, Julian	11,919	54.37%
NUP	Miano, Jasmin	11,581	52.83%
NUP	Jarvinia, Jomar	10,373	47.32%
Independent	Laurado, Krischan	9,681	44.16%
NUP	Labuguen, Patchy	8,555	39.02%
Independent	Cadeliña, Mark Lester	7,907	36.07%
NUP	Castillejos, Arnel	7,907	36.07%
WPP	Asuncion, Eric	7,426	33.87%
Independent	Gabitan, Jason	4,353	19.86%
WPP	Uaje, Jayson	4,334	19.77%
Total votes			

=== Cordon ===
As of May 13, 2022, 100.00% precincts have reported.

Cordon Mayoralty Elections
Party	Candidate	Votes	%
PDP–Laban	Zuniega, Lynn	16,152	66.21%
PRP	Salatan, Gideon	8,243	33.79%
Invalid or blank votes		0	0.00%
Total votes		24,395	100.00%

Cordon Vice Mayoralty Elections
Party	Candidate	Votes	%
PDP–Laban	Sable, Abegail	15,412	65.61%
NPC	Ngipol, Jane	8,079	34.39%
Invalid or blank votes		0	0.00%
Total votes		23,491	100.00%

2022 Cordon Municipal Council Elections
Party	Candidate	Votes	%
PDP–Laban	Zuniega, Florenz	12,873	51.02%
NPC	Queddeng, Jaime	11,316	44.85%
Aksyon	Galeng, Rene	10,840	42.96%
Aksyon	Malupeng, Efren	9,827	38.95%
NPC	Cayaban, Rosendo	9.549	37.84%
NUP	Villador, Ayson	8,954	35.49%
PRP	Mariano, Charlita	8,818	34.95%
NPC	Vallejo, Menardo	7,557	29.95%
Lakas	Salas, Martino Jr.	7,362	29.18%
NUP	Viray, Cresencio Jr.	7,319	29.01%
PDP–Laban	Naui, Josephine	7,195	28.51%
Lakas	Maddumba, Marie Joy	7,138	28.29%
PRP	Cezar-Seculles, Caren	5,982	23.71%
PRP	Gorospe, Marlito	5,314	21.06%
Independent	Soriano, Janeth	4,515	17.89%
PRP	Domingo, Merson	4,339	17.20%
PRP	Salum, Melchor	4,111	16.29%
NPC	Espiritu, Maria Elena	4,086	16.19%
NPC	Solomon, Amalia	2,807	11.12%
Independent	Corpuz, Hector	2,777	11.01%
NPC	Cera, Juanito	2,663	10.55%
PFP	Samonte, Rodrigo Jr.	2,642	10.47%
NPC	Neyra, Mila	1,290	5.11%
NPC	Fabros, Roland	1,288	5.10%
Independent	Dacanay, Rey Jr.	874	3.46%
Total votes			

=== Delfin Albano ===
As of May 13, 2022, 100.00% precincts have reported.

Delfin Albano Mayoralty Elections
Party	Candidate	Votes	%
Lakas	Co, Arnold Edward	11,814	82.96%
PDP–Laban	Taccad, Mike	2,427	17.04%
Invalid or blank votes		0	0.00%
Total votes		14,241	100.00%

Delfin Albano Vice Mayoralty Elections
Party	Candidate	Votes	%
Lakas	Pua, Thomas Jr.	12,729	89.88%
PDP–Laban	Taccad, Eunice	1,418	10.02%
Invalid or blank votes		0	0.00%
Total votes		14,147	100.00%

2022 Delfin Albano Municipal Council Elections
Party	Candidate	Votes	%
Independent Politician	Caliguiran, Maximo Jr.	11,105	70.89%
PDP–Laban	Macarilay, Alex Jr.	9,528	60.82%
NPC	Albano, Anthony	8,588	54.82%
NPC	Cañero, Elli John	8,263	52.75%
Aksyon	Caliguiran, Jay.	7,901	50.44%
Independent	Badua, Edwin	7,743	49.43%
NPC	Talamayan, Joel	7,552	48.21%
Independent	Dumlao, Clemente Jr.	7,222	46.10%
PDP–Laban	Cristobal, Sheila Joy	6,585	42.04%
PDP–Laban	Alaska, Rufidel	5,516	35.21%
Aksyon	Galope, Elma	4,363	27.85%
Independent	Acido, Elpidio	4,199	26.80%
Total votes			

=== Dinapigue ===
As of May 13, 2022, 100.00% precincts have reported.

Dinapigue Mayoralty Elections
Party	Candidate	Votes	%
PDP–Laban	Mendoza, Vicente	1,935	52.68%
NPC	Candido, Rea Sylvia	1,738	47.32%
Invalid or blank votes		0	0.00%
Total votes		3,673	100.00%

Dinapigue Vice Mayoralty Elections
Party	Candidate	Votes	%
PDP–Laban	Derije, Reynaldo	2,269	63.74%
NPC	Andres, Patrick	1,291	36.26%
Total votes		0	0.00%
Total votes		3,560	100.00%

2022 Dinapigue Municipal Council Elections
Party	Candidate	Votes	%
PDP–Laban	Cariño, Samuel	2,229	58.83%
Independent	Monzon, Jun	2,088	55.11%
NPC	Araña, Joel	1,866	49.25%
PDP–Laban	Vargas, Aldo Rey	1,858	49.04%
Independent	Palitayan, Jhonas	1,814	47.88%
NPC	Araña, Jojit Alexis	1,724	45.50%
NPC	Candido, Shelah	1,651	43.57%
PDP–Laban	Derije, Joselito	1,564	41.28%
NPC	Abon, Romel	1,341	35.39%
PDP–Laban	Duque, Fernando	1,210	31.93%
Independent	Ubongen, Jonathan	1,150	30.35%
NPC	Comida, Danilo	1,136	29.98%
Independent	Dulnuan, Felisa	1,109	29.27%
PDP–Laban	Domincel, Bea	1,052	27.76%
PDP–Laban	Dy, Nicholai Alexis	885	23.36%
PDP–Laban	Carreon, Rogelio	649	17.13%
NPC	Donato, Anatalio	637	16.81%
Independent	Dela Peña, Juliana	522	13.78%
NPC	Garcia, Ma Luisa	235	6.20%
PDP–Laban	Lopez, Teodoro	225	5.94%
Independent	Motiong, Wilson	139	3.67%
Total votes			

=== Divilacan ===
As of May 13, 2022, 100.00% precincts have reported.

Divilacan Mayoralty Elections
Party	Candidate	Votes	%
Lakas	Bulan, Venturito	2,566	96.43%
Independent	Gloria, Carmen	95	3.57%
Invalid or blank votes		0	0.00%
Total votes		2,661	100.00%

Divilacan Vice Mayoralty Elections
Party	Candidate	Votes	%
Lakas	Custodio, Alfredo	2,142	100.00%
Invalid or blank votes		0	0.00%
Total votes		2,142	100.00%

2022 Divilacan Municipal Council Elections
Party	Candidate	Votes	%
Lakas	Bulan, Melvin Dan	2,091	70.50%
Lakas	Cortes, Olegario	1,761	59.37%
Lakas	Limboy, Hercleo	1,742	58.73%
Lakas	Tabbada, Cesar	1,668	56.24%
Lakas	Custodio, Fredirick	1,479	49.87%
Independent	Equias, Marina	1,450	48.89%
Lakas	Singueo, Tony	1,436	48.42%
Lakas	Factora, Erlinda	1,429	48.18%
Lakas	Crisostomo, Jerson	1,202	40.53%
Independent	Amante, Julie	1,118	37.69%
Independent	Pecaat, Nortencio	1,050	35.40%
Independent	Salvador, Concepcion	957	32.27%
Independent	Malobo, Danilo	868	29.27%
Independent	Aglibot, Weng	570	19.22%
Independent	Libunao, Crisanto Jr.	219	7.38%
Independent	Acabo, Jolieto	95	3.20%
Independent	Abaquita, Jose	72	2.43%
Total votes			

=== Echague ===
As of May 13, 2022, 100.00% precincts have reported.

Echague Mayoralty Elections
Party	Candidate	Votes	%
Lakas	Dy, Kiko	31,375	70.62%
Independent	Culang, Emilio Jr.	13,055	29.38%
Invalid or blank votes		0	0.00%
Total votes		44,430	100.00%

Echague Vice Mayoralty Elections
Party	Candidate	Votes	%
PFP	Tupong, Allan	29,986	71.99%
Independent	Babaran, Virginia	11,667	28.01%
Invalid or blank votes		0	0.00%
Total votes		41,653	100.00%

2022 Echague Municipal Council Elections
Party	Candidate	Votes	%
Lakas	Alili, Fred	28,513	60.43%
Lakas	Uy, Walter	27,146	57.53%
Lakas	Castillo, Bobot	27,042	57.31%
Aksyon	Acosta, Jun	25,978	55.06%
PDP–Laban	Domingo, Hector	25,959	55.02%
PDP–Laban	Panganiban, Nolito	24,633	52.21%
Reporma	Baccay, Edgardo	23,348	49.48%
Aksyon	Rivera, Joyce	18,842	39.93%
Independent	Aggabao, Saulo	12,311	26.09%
Independent	Dumaliang, Lily	9,216	19.53%
Independent	Sagauinit, Cecilia	6,242	13.23%
Independent	Gumpal, Abbet	6,878	14.58%
Independent	Sagauinit, Ferdimar	6,242	13.23%
Independent	Somera, Ipe	5,925	12.56%
Independent	Cadabuna, Vincent	5,429	11.51%
Independent	Gomez, Enriquito	3,819	8.09%
Independent	Ritua, Rolando	2,241	4.75%
Total votes			

=== Gamu ===
As of May 13, 2022, 100.00% precincts have reported.

Gamu Mayoralty Elections
Party	Candidate	Votes	%
PROMDI	Galanza, Temy	10,024	60.66%
Nacionalista	Lacerna, Nestor	6,500	39.34%
Invalid or blank votes		0	0.00%
Total votes		16,524	100.00%

Gamu Vice Mayoralty Elections
Party	Candidate	Votes	%
PDP–Laban	Cumigad, Mitzi	9,306	57.58%
Nacionalista	Uy, Nestor	6,856	42.42%
Invalid or blank votes		0	0.00%
Total votes		16,162	100.00%

2022 Gamu Municipal Council Elections
Party	Candidate	Votes	%
PDP–Laban	Labbuanan, Sheryl	7,902	45.99%
PDP–Laban	Cumigad, March Luigi	7,610	44.29%
Nacionalista	Burkley, Estela	7,083	41.22%
PDP–Laban	Preza, Camilo	6,835	39.78%
Nacionalista	Agustin, Rey	6,703	39.01%
Nacionalista	Caro, Bong	6,302	36.68%
PDP–Laban	Labayog, Norberto	5,592	32.54%
Nacionalista	Martinez, Dante	5,508	32.05%
Independent	Uy, Tim Batang Gamu	5,181	30.15%
PDP–Laban	Angangan, Marlo Jr.	4,864	28.31%
Nacionalista	Villareal, Jesus Jr.	4,801	27.94%
Nacionalista	Lora, Jose	4,293	24.98%
Independent	Cantor, Dionicio	4,250	24.73%
Aksyon	Lumilan, Roger	4,050	23.57%
PDP–Laban	Villanueva, Elfren	3,666	21.34%
PDP–Laban	Gacutan, Lito	3,640	21.18%
Aksyon	Gatering, George	3,589	20.89%
PROMDI	Montoro, Solita	3,369	19.61%
Independent	Junio, MoNacionalista Partyhil	3,122	18.17%
Independent	Ramirez, Ato	1,738	10.11%
Independent	Medrano, Debbie	1,470	8.55%
Independent	Cantor, Melvie	1,404	8.17%
Total votes			

=== Jones ===
As of May 13, 2022, 100.00% precincts have reported.

Jones Mayoralty Elections
Party	Candidate	Votes	%
KBL	Montano, Nhel	11,104	45.27%
NPC	Sebastian, Suzette	6,840	27.88%
PDP–Laban	Gumpal, Gaylord	6,587	26.85%
Invalid or blank votes		0	0.00%
Total votes		24,531	100.00%

Jones Vice Mayoralty Elections
Party	Candidate	Votes	%
PDP–Laban	Raspado, Evelyn	11,856	52.71%
NPC	Uy, Melanie	10,637	47.29%
Invalid or blank votes		0	0.00%
Total votes		22,493	100.00%

2022 Jones Municipal Council Elections
Party	Candidate	Votes	%
Lakas	Bangloy, Cynthia	11,686	45.03%
NPC	Ramos, Arland	11,218	43.23%
Lakas	Sy, Gigi	10,201	39.31%
PDP–Laban	Raspado, Julius	8,961	34.53%
PDP–Laban	Sabiniano, John	8,794	33.89%
NPC	Aggabao, Irene	8,451	32.56%
PDP–Laban	Reyes, Jervin	8,439	32.52%
KBL	Anunciacion, Jhan	8,374	32.27%
NPC	Cabel, Glen Albert	6,477	24.96%
Independent	Rafanan, Rodrigo	6,334	24.41%
Lakas	Pascual, Manolito	6,320	24.35%
PDDS	De Vera, Chat	6,228	24.00%
PDP–Laban	Colobong, Arnulfo	5,876	22.64%
Independent	Mamauag, Leonardo	5,336	20.56%
NPC	Juan, Elmer	4,773	18.39%
Lakas	Apolinario, Nestor	4,573	17.62%
KBL	Pablo, Jomar	4,032	15.54%
NPC	Felipe, Renato Jr.	3,892	14.75%
Independent	Siscar, Jeffer	3,827	14.75%
NPC	Rabonza, Erwin Maury	3,662	14.11%
Independent	Lazaro, Ben Jr.	3.598	13.86%
KBL	Soriano, Nelli	3,456	13.32%
NPC	Domingo, Aser	2,832	10.91%
NPC	Tiburcio, Alwin	2,218	8.55%
Total votes			

=== Luna ===
As of May 13, 2022, 100.00% precincts have reported.

Luna Mayoralty Elections
Party	Candidate	Votes	%
NPC	Tio, Adrian Leandro	7,949	66.42%
KBL	Mendoza, Bernabe	3,651	30.51%
Independent	Mendoza, Eduardo	368	3.07%
Invalid or blank votes		0	0.00%
Total votes		11,968	100.00%

Luna Vice Mayoralty Elections
Party	Candidate	Votes	%
NPC	Soingco, Lelamen	7,198	63.16%
KBL	Domingo, Andy	4,198	36.84%
Invalid or blank votes		0	0.00%
Total votes		11,396	100.00%

2022 Luna Municipal Council Elections
Party	Candidate	Votes	%
Independent	Tan, Leslie	8,378	65.80%
NUP	Perez, Vicente III	7,891	61.97%
Aksyon	Perez, Allan John	7,367	57.86%
Aksyon	Pua, Panchito	6,340	49.79%
Independent	Cabacungan, Pilar	6,091	47.84%
Aksyon	Rivera, Jerry	5,675	44.57%
NUP	Agustin, Bayani	5,454	44.57%
NPC	Baysac, Eisenhower	5,438	42.71%
Aksyon	Medina, Franklin	5,390	42.33%
NPC	Yadao, Ben	5,374	42.21%
KBL	Agcaoili, Jeremiah	4,481	35.19%
KBL	Baysac, Jesson	3,619	28.42%
KBL	Mendoza, Alfredo	3,563	27.98%
KBL	Ramones, Wilson	1,597	12.54%
KBL	Balmores, Eisenhower	1,380	10.84%
KBL	Matusalem, Marlon	1,355	10.64%
KBL	De Leon, Myriam	1,296	9.97%
KBL	Pascua, Juwelex	724	5.69%
Total votes			

=== Maconacon ===
As of May 13, 2022, 100.00% precincts have reported.

Maconacon Mayoralty Elections
Party	Candidate	Votes	%
Independent	Quebral, Rolly	1,279	53.09%
Lakas	Taberner, Jolly	1,121	46.53%
Independent	Villanueva, Wally	9	0.37%
Invalid or blank votes		0	0.00%
Total votes		2,409	100.00%

Maconacon Vice Mayoralty Elections
Party	Candidate	Votes	%
Lakas	Domingo, Lycelle	1,443	60.78%
Independent	Roxas, Alfredo	931	39.42%
Invalid or blank votes		0	0.00%
Total votes		2,374	100.00%

2022 Maconacon Municipal Council Elections
Party	Candidate	Votes	%
Independent	Manalay, Aida	1,524	59.32%
Lakas	Vicente, Chester	1,488	57.92%
Lakas	Guiñez, Emm Emm	1,232	47.96%
Independent	Baricog, Rene Sr.	1,205	46.91%
Lakas	Costales, Jannet	1,182	46.01%
Independent	Peralta, Richard	1,086	42.23%
Aksyon	Perucho, Michael	1,085	42.23%
Lakas	Rapanut, Edilbert	1,079	42.00%
Independent	Parto, Marygrace	1,038	40.40%
Independent	Liberato, Valentino	1,038	40.40%
Independent	Aguinaldo, George Sr.	1,027	39.98%
Lakas	Lacar, Joseph	1,020	39.70%
Aksyon	Oriarte, Emerson	980	38.15%
Lakas	Fermin, Nida	978	38.07%
Independent	Subia, German	951	37.02%
Independent	Villanueva, Frances	808	31.45%
Total votes			

=== Mallig ===
As of May 13, 2022, 100.00% precincts have reported.

Mallig Mayoralty Elections
Party	Candidate	Votes	%
NPC	Calderon, JP	13,167	83.09%
PDP–Laban	Ortega, Jackie	2,679	16.91%
Invalid or blank votes		0	0.00%
Total votes		15,846	100.00%

Mallig Vice Mayoralty Elections
Party	Candidate	Votes	%
NPC	Felipe, Dadong	7,322	46.05%
Independent	Flores, Pedro	4,777	30.05%
PFP	Isidro, Maximo III	3,800	23.90%
Invalid or blank votes		0	0.00%
Total votes		15,899	100.00%

2022 Mallig Municipal Council Elections
Party	Candidate	Votes	%
PDP–Laban	Elefante, Deo Angelo	9,067	52.61%
PDP–Laban	Balagan, Carlos	8,899	51.63%
NPC	Baniqued, Andong	8,656	50.22%
Lakas	Ramiscal, Limbas	8,129	47.16%
PFP	Isidro, Marjorie	7,079	41.07%
Aksyon	Baniqued, Sammy	6,831	39.63%
Lakas	Pascual, Petra	6,581	38.18%
Lakas	Lactao, Princess	6,489	37.65%
Aksyon	Bautista, Marlyn	6,457	37.46%
PDP–Laban	Joson, Bong	5,403	31.35%
PFP	Balisi, Portia	4,708	27.31%
PFP	Elizarde, Almario	4,703	27.29%
PFP	Egipto, Bansiong	4,133	23.98%
PFP	Gabuya, Joseph	2,836	16.45%
PDP–Laban	Chua, Chesley Shane	2,362	13.70%
PFP	Mejia, Assing	2,201	12.77%
WPP	Quidasol, Margarita	902	5.23%
Total votes			

=== Naguilian ===
As of May 13, 2022, 100.00% precincts have reported.

Naguilian Mayoralty Elections
Party	Candidate	Votes	%
Nacionalista	Capuchino, Juan	13,667	100.00%
Invalid or blank votes		0	0.00%
Total votes		13,667	100.00%

Naguilian Vice Mayoralty Elections
Party	Candidate	Votes	%
Nacionalista	Acosta, Isidro Jr.	9,816	58.29%
KBL	Valdez, Vicente Jr.	7,025	41.71%
Invalid or blank votes		0	0.00%
Total votes		16,841	100.00%

2022 Naguilian Municipal Council Elections
Party	Candidate	Votes	%
Nacionalista	Reyes, Julie	13,334	73.35%
Lakas	Dela Peña, Boy	10,899	59.95%
Nacionalista	Bartolome, Santy	10,758	59.18%
Aksyon	Buccuan, Rocky Jones	10,637	58.51%
Aksyon	Bunagan, Doming	10,096	55.54%
Nacionalista	Parado, Bert	9,137	50.26%
Nacionalista	Rosete, Jaypee	8,985	49.43%
Nacionalista	Pablo, Doming	8,436	46.41
Independent	Garcia, Jing	7,849	43.18%
Independent	Valencia, Lito	7,531	41.43%
Independent	Singson, Elpidio	5,065	27.86%
KBL	Tomines, James	4,208	23.15%
Total votes			

=== Palanan ===
As of May 13, 2022, 100.00% precincts have reported.

Palanan Mayoralty Elections
Party	Candidate	Votes	%
Nacionalista	Bernardo, Angelo	4,789	50.39%
WPP	Gonzales, Jimmy	4,715	49.61%
Invalid or blank votes		0	0.00%
Total votes		9,504	100.00%

Palanan Vice Mayoralty Elections
Party	Candidate	Votes	%
Nacionalista	Ochoa, Elizabeth	6,262	71.24%
WPP	Bernardo, Melo	2,528	28.76%
Invalid or blank votes		0	0.00%
Total votes		8,790	100.00%

2022 Palanan Municipal Council Elections
Party	Candidate	Votes	%
Independent	Neri, Bob	5,668	54.65%
WPP	Ramilo, Michael	5,249	50.61%
Nacionalista	Atanacio, Mona	5,065	48.83%
Nacionalista	Atienza, Nunu	4,943	47.66%
Aksyon	Bernardo, EJ	4,472	43.12%
Nacionalista	Bernardo, John John	4,338	41.82%
WPP	Corpuz, Rhoena	4,000	38.57%
Aksyon	Bernardo, Onad	3,918	37.77%
Nacionalista	Dela Peña, Elda	3,711	35.78%
WPP	Magas, Alex	3,676	35.44%
WPP	Roscal, Myla	3,649	35.18%
Nacionalista	Garcia, Theo	3,255	31.38%
WPP	Gonzales, Lea	3,141	30.28%
Nacionalista	Cauilan, Loly	2,816	27.15%
WPP	Bernardo, Totie	1,382	13.32%
Independent	Baquidan, Nora	1,183	11.41%
Independent	Virrey, Dave	1,181	11.39%
WPP	Vila, Arwin	1,036	9.99%
Independent	Bayaua, Marvin Butz	713	6.87%
Independent	Almonte, Wanda	705	6.80%
Independent	Castillejo, Edgar	343	3.31%
Total votes			

=== Quezon ===
As of May 13, 2022, 100.00% precincts have reported.

Quezon Mayoralty Elections
Party	Candidate	Votes	%
NPC	Gamazon, Jimboy	10,793	100.00%
Invalid or blank votes		0	0.00%
Total votes		10,793	100.00%

Quezon Vice Mayoralty Elections
Party	Candidate	Votes	%
NPC	Gascon, Daryl	10,291	100.00%
Invalid or blank votes		0	0.00%
Total votes		10,291	100.00%

2022 Quezon Municipal Council Elections
Party	Candidate	Votes	%
NPC	Gante, Owen	9,415	68.81%
NPC	Dioquino, Annaliza	7,358	53.78%
NPC	Lacambra, Armando	7,310	53.43%
NPC	Killip, Angel	7,284	53.24%
NPC	Gamazon, Jimmy Sr.	7,075	51.71%
NPC	Andumang, Candido Sr.	7,035	51.42%
NPC	Poquiz, Jesus	6,904	50.46%
NPC	Infante, Daisy	6,722	49.13%
Reporma	Dulig, Alpha	5,038	36.82%
Reporma	Padilla, Ronelle	4,427	32.36%
Reporma	Ortiguero, Rostum	3,944	28.83%
Independent	Orani, Mely	3,875	28.32%
Independent	Gaste, Estalina	3,643	26.63%
Independent	Estacio, Eduardo	893	6.53%
Independent	Manuel, Roly	294	2.15%
Total votes			

=== Quirino ===
As of May 13, 2022, 100.00% precincts have reported.

Quirino Mayoralty Elections
Party	Candidate	Votes	%
NPC	Juan, Edward	7,838	57.96%
PDP–Laban	Manlutac, Eris	5,684	42.04%
Invalid or blank votes		0	0.00%
Total votes		13,522	100.00%

Quirino Vice Mayoralty Elections
Party	Candidate	Votes	%
NPC	Callangan, Victor Emmanuel	10,530	83.99%
PDP–Laban	Domingo, Danilo	2,007	16.01%
Invalid or blank votes		0	0.00%
Total votes		12,537	100.00%

2022 Quirino Municipal Council Elections
Party	Candidate	Votes	%
Lakas	Corpuz, Adela	8,273	57.31%
Lakas	Callangan, Jayson	8,112	56.20%
Independent	Diampoc, Earl	8,048	55.75%
Lakas	Buguina, Rosalino	7,967	55.19%
NPC	Espiritu, Emelito	7,826	54.22%
Lakas	Lucas, Willy	6,755	46.80%
NPC	Ginez, Ricarte	6,182	42.83%
Independent	Aquino, Mercy	6,181	42.82%
NPC	Ganitano, Federico Jr.	5,865	40.63%
NPC	Dalit, Eddie Sonny	5,660	39.21%
WPP	Aguinaldo, Fely	3,347	23.19%
WPP	Aquino, Wilfredo	1,994	13.81%
WPP	Estrada, Nory	1,589	11.01%
Total votes			

=== Ramon ===
As of May 13, 2022, 100.00% precincts have reported.

Ramon Mayoralty Elections
Party	Candidate	Votes	%
NPC	Laddaran, Jess	12,858	48.32%
PROMDI	Tutaan, Marlon	11,374	42.74%
Independent	Tabag, Wilfredo	2,379	8.94%
Invalid or blank votes		0	0.00%
Total votes		26,611	100.00%

Ramon Vice Mayoralty Elections
Party	Candidate	Votes	%
NPC	Dela Cruz, Jon Jon	20,306	83.79%
Independent	Babaran, Gladys	3,927	16.21%
Invalid or blank votes		0	0.00%
Total votes		24,233	100.00%

2022 Ramon Municipal Council Elections
Party	Candidate	Votes	%
Aksyon	Vizcarra, Giovanni	14,158	49.93%
PROMDI	Cristobal, Melvin	13,410	47.29%
Independent	Navarro, Myrna	11,463	40.43%
Aksyon	Banhan, Rita	10,468	36.92%
Lakas	Esteban, Kit	9,642	34.01%
NPC	Terte, Rodrigo	8,761	30.90%
PROMDI	Natividad, Candido Jr.	8,643	30.48%
Independent	Vizcarra, Danilo	8,295	29.26%
Independent	Sabado, George	8,210	28.96
NPC	Dalupang, Felisa	7,575	26.72%
PROMDI	Bad-ang, Jose	6,899	24.33%
Aksyon	Lomboy, Jiji	6,838	24.12%
PROMDI	Honorio, Cha	6,541	23.07%
Lakas	Estefanio, Domingo	5,960	21.02%
Independent	Reyes, Melenia	5,428	19.14%
PROMDI	Ang, Joel	5,360	18.90%
Independent	Gamiz, Willy Jr.	5,024	17.72%
PROMDI	Alejo, Marlon	4,175	14.72%
Aksyon	Lazo, Sir Pons	3,990	14.07%
Independent	Asuncion, Jumer	3,276	11.55%
Independent	Cristobal, Rickyson	3,151	11.11%
PROMDI	Laxamana, Emmanuel	3,002	10.59%
Independent	Castelo, Teddy	663	2.34%
Total votes			

=== Reina Mercedes ===
As of May 13, 2022, 100.00% precincts have reported.

Reina Mercedes Mayoralty Elections
Party	Candidate	Votes	%
Nacionalista	Respicio-Saguban, Malou	10,450	73.83%
Reporma	Uy, Alvin	3,643	25.74%
Independent	Palogan, Boying	61	0.43%
Invalid or blank votes		0	0.00%
Total votes		14,154	100.00%

Reina Mercedes Vice Mayoralty Elections
Party	Candidate	Votes	%
Nacionalista	Respicio, Bong	8,956	72.45%
Reporma	Pua, Winster	3,405	27.55%
Invalid or blank votes		0	0.00%
Total votes		12,350	100.00%

2022 Reina Mercedes Municipal Council Elections
Party	Candidate	Votes	%
Lakas	Addun, Banjo	7,267	48.12%
Reporma	Cutaran, Bong	6,588	43.63%
Nacionalista	Barangan, Arnol	6,583	43.59%
Nacionalista	Apostol, Tony	6,148	40.71%
Aksyon	Cuntapay, Bino	5,443	36.04%
Nacionalista	Valdez, Agustin Jr.	5,209	34.49%
Nacionalista	Baua, Bobot	5,161	34.18%
Nacionalista	Esteban, Edwin	4,991	33.05%
Aksyon	Agas, Boyet	4,940	32.71%
Reporma	Etrata, Michael	4,392	29.08%
Nacionalista	Angoluan, Manuel	4,078	27.00%
Lakas	Barrientos, Ligaya	3,828	25.35%
Independent	Solito, Jimmy	3,478	23.03%
Independent	Guillermo, Mox	3,451	22.85%
Lakas	Marfil, Antonio	3,332	22.06%
Reporma	Bautista, Nancy	3,147	20.84%
Reporma	Tagangin, Roland	2,608	17.27%
Reporma	Galanza, Pedrito	2,451	16.23%
Reporma	Frogozo, Cesar	2,220	14.70%
Lakas	Respicio, Ronilo	1,910	12.65%
Reporma	Lacaste, Jackson	1,329	8.80%
Reporma	Quitola, Glee	1,177	7.79%
Independent	Razo, Joy	590	3.91%
Independent	Magaoay, Boteng	363	2.40%
Total votes			

=== Roxas ===
As of May 13, 2022, 100.00% precincts have reported.

Roxas Mayoralty Elections
Party	Candidate	Votes	%
NPC	Calderon, Dok-totep	25,365	100.00%
Invalid or blank votes		0	0.00%
Total votes		25,365	100.00%

Roxas Vice Mayoralty Elections
Party	Candidate	Votes	%
Lakas	Sebastian, Nick	23,592	100.00%
Invalid or blank votes		0	0.00%
Total votes		23,592	100.00%

2022 Roxas Municipal Council Elections
Party	Candidate	Votes	%
Lakas	Navalta, Jonathan	20,019	58.24%
Independent	Paguyo, Gretelmar	19,707	57.33%
Lakas	Hui, Antonio	19,334	56.24%
NUP	Deray, Bong	17,962	52.25%
Aksyon	Lanuza, Clint	17,301	50.33%
NUP	Castillo, Boyet	17,130	49.83%
NPC	Soriano, Peter Jude	16,653	48.44%
NPC	Domingo, Winnie	15,855	46.12%
Aksyon	Garcia, Minda	14,098	41.01%
Independent	Purugganan, Achilles	12,260	35.66%
Total votes			

=== San Agustin ===
As of May 13, 2022, 100.00% precincts have reported.

San Agustin Mayoralty Elections
Party	Candidate	Votes	%
PDP–Laban	Mondala, Cesar	8,679	69.59%
Reporma	Padilla, Edilie	3,793	30.41%
Invalid or blank votes		0	0.00%
Total votes		12,472	100.00%

San Agustin Vice Mayoralty Elections
Party	Candidate	Votes	%
Independent	Micu, Oliver	4,433	37.28%
Reporma	Mayor, Eddie	4,024	33.84%
PDP–Laban	Guerrero, Mark	3,433	28.87%
Invalid or blank votes		0	0.00%
Total votes		11,890	100.00%

2022 San Agustin Municipal Council Elections
Party	Candidate	Votes	%
PDP–Laban	Mondala, Raden	8,289	63.94%
Independent	Domingo, Eddie	4,800	37.03%
Lakas	Suni, Paul Jerrymie	4,788	36.94%
PDP–Laban	Respicio, Manuel	4,732	36.50%
Reporma	Yasol, Menchie	4,417	34.07%
Reporma	Daguro, Nolie	4,211	32.48%
Lakas	Guerrero, Artemio	4,105	31.67%
PDP–Laban	Vargas, Rose	3,997	30.83%
PDP–Laban	Pascual, Rodel	3,971	30.63%
Lakas	Alejandro, William	3,916	30.21%
Reporma	Padilla, Rommel	3,876	29.90%
PDP–Laban	Paguyo, Bebeth	3,860	29.78%
PDP–Laban	Daguro, Marilou	3,491	26.93%
Lakas	Sabado, Frederick	3,197	24.66%
Reporma	Evangelista, Edgard	2,993	23.09%
Reporma	Pascual, Joel	2,728	21.04%
Reporma	Menis, Barney Jr.	2,046	15.78%
Reporma	Manuel, Darlita	1,883	14.53%
Total votes			

=== San Guillermo ===
As of May 13, 2022, 100.00% precincts have reported.

San Guillermo Mayoralty Elections
Party	Candidate	Votes	%
PDP–Laban	Guyud, Felipe Jr.	9,895	100.00%
Invalid or blank votes		0	0.00%
Total votes		9,895	100.00%

San Guillermo Vice Mayoralty Elections
Party	Candidate	Votes	%
Aksyon	Lucas, Bernardine	9,624	100.00%
Invalid or blank votes		0	0.00%
Total votes		9,624	100.00%

2022 San Guillermo Municipal Council Elections
Party	Candidate	Votes	%
NPC	Sanchez, Marilou	8,968	78.16%
Aksyon	Sanchez, John	8,364	72.90%
NPC	Guyud, Harrison	7,742	67.47%
NPC	De Guzman, Jolly	7,690	67.02%
NPC	Marcos, Florido	7,576	66.03%
NPC	Castañeda, Ricardo	7,533	65.65%
NPC	Cabaero, Marcelina	7,094	61.83%
NPC	Guyud, Noli	6,791	59.19%
Independent	Sarmiento, Alejandro Jr.	5,270	45.93%
Independent	Bilog, Gani	1,594	13.89%
Total votes			

=== San Isidro ===
As of May 13, 2022, 100.00% precincts have reported.

San Isidro Mayoralty Elections
Party	Candidate	Votes	%
LDP	Bravo, Vilmer	8,162	57.63%
NPC	Cruz, Roderick	5,876	41.49%
DPP	Gonzales, Zeus	124	0.88%
Invalid or blank votes		0	0.00%
Total votes		14,162	100.00%

San Isidro Vice Mayoralty Elections
Party	Candidate	Votes	%
NUP	Tumamao, Leonardo	6,306	46.46%
NPC	Tumamao, Ittong	5,405	39.82%
PROMDI	Velasco, Rs	1,862	13.72%
Invalid or blank votes		0	0.00%
Total votes		13,573	100.00%

2022 San Isidro Municipal Council Elections
Party	Candidate	Votes	%
NUP	Sario, Alberto	7,490	51.25%
NUP	Bravo, Tin	7,213	49.35%
Independent	Mariano, Guill Marc	6,171	42.22%
NUP	Lomboy, Levy	6,109	41.80%
Lakas	Gervacio, Sharon	5,450	37.29%
Independent	Urbano, Jerry	4,931	33.74%
NUP	Sta Maria, Ronald	4,611	31.55%
Aksyon	Ulep, Lovelie	4,249	29.07%
LDP	Cube, Mario Sr.	4,053	27.73%
NPC	Espanto, Celso	4,019	27.50%
Aksyon	Dolores, Atcha	3,828	26.19%
NPC	Acorda, Trisha	3,719	25.44%
NPC	Echanes, Marvin	3,551	24.30%
NPC	Viernes, Caloy	3,389	23.19%
LDP	Valenzuela, Emerson	3,283	22.46%
NPC	Hope, Reynaldo Jr.	3,204	21.92%
NPC	Arquero, Gian	3,158	21.61%
NPC	Barroga, Arnel	3,042	20.81%
NPC	Dumaliang, Fe	2,175	14.88%
Independent	Vicente, Gaylord	1,793	12.27%
Total votes			

=== San Manuel ===
As of May 13, 2022, 100.00% precincts have reported.

San Manuel Mayoralty Elections
Party	Candidate	Votes	%
LDP	Dy, Dondon	9,885	100.00%
Invalid or blank votes			
Total votes			

San Manuel Vice Mayoralty Elections
Party	Candidate	Votes	%
LDP	Santos, Juntocles	8,810	52.86%
WPP	Napicog, Mario	7,857	47.14%
Invalid or blank votes		0	0.00%
Total votes		16,667	100.00%

2022 San Manuel Municipal Council Elections
Party	Candidate	Votes	%
LDP	Ventura, Moy	11,007	60.47%
LDP	Escobar, Esco	10,313	56.66%
LDP	Ignacio, Rap	10,299	56.58%
LDP	Velasco, Palitong	10,000	54.94%
Lakas	Ramos, Pimo	9,850	54.11%
WPP	Abad, Leslie	9,541	54.41%
LDP	Balbas, Pen	9,495	52.16%
Lakas	Mateo, Jo-mark	8,688	47.73%
LDP	Tumamao, Lovely	8,175	44.91%
Total votes			

=== San Mariano ===
As of May 13, 2022, 100.00% precincts have reported.

San Mariano Mayoralty Elections
Party	Candidate	Votes	%
Nacionalista	Go, Edgar Bobot	25,503	100.00%
Invalid or blank votes		0	0.00%
Total votes		25,503	100.00%

San Mariano Vice Mayoralty Elections
Party	Candidate	Votes	%
Nacionalista	Domalanta, Den-den	24,870	100.00%
Invalid or blank votes		0	0.00%
Total votes		24,870	100.00%

2022 San Mariano Municipal Council Elections
Party	Candidate	Votes	%
Nacionalista	Buguina, Marivic	23,015	77.59%
Nacionalista	Miranda, Minette	21,032	70.90%
Aksyon	Aggabao, Nemo Nick	19,753	66.59%
Nacionalista	Go, Girlie	19,751	66.58%
Nacionalista	Duca, Spd	17,474	58.91%
Nacionalista	Miranda, Jerimar	16,744	56.45%
Aksyon	Pascual, Kevin	16,458	55.48%
Nacionalista	Bartolome, Florita-Marietta	15,733	53.04%
Independent	Cenit, Helen	11,293	38.07%
Independent	Pascaran, Jorgie	10,898	36.74%
Independent	Bautista, Doc Cat	1,897	6.39%
Total votes			

=== San Mateo ===
As of May 13, 2022, 100.00% precincts have reported.

San Mateo Mayoralty Elections
Party	Candidate	Votes	%
NPC	Pua, Gregorio	21,439	60.92%
Liberal	Agcaoili, Ampie	13,755	39.08%
Invalid or blank votes		0	0.00%
Total votes		35,194	100.00%

San Mateo Vice Mayoralty Elections
Party	Candidate	Votes	%
NPC	Barangan, Arvin	18,805	54.40%
Aksyon	Agcaoili, Nonoy	15,764	45.60%
Invalid or blank votes		0	0.00%
Total votes		34,569	100.00%

2022 San Mateo Municipal Council Elections
Party	Candidate	Votes	%
Liberal	Agcaoili, Atty. Wella	19,710	54.25%
NUP	Ramones, Michael Angelo	19,406	53.41%
Liberal	Gamboa, Ogos	19,140	52.68%
Independent	Cadeliña, Sherwyn	17,363	47.79%
Independent	Palomares, Lailo Paulo	16,383	45.09%
Lakas	Collado, Jona Paranas	16,127	44.39%
Independent	Subia, Eric	15,816	43.53%
NUP	Villamar, Santi	15,431	42.47%
Independent	Galapon, Neil	15,181	41.78%
Liberal	Lintao, Doc Harold	14,135	38.90%
Liberal	Cadeliña, Director	10,489	28.87%
Lakas	Uao, Antonio	10,343	28.47%
Independent	Astrero, Jaya	10,174	28.00%
Independent	Bautista, Simo	9,500	26.15%
Independent	Cirineo, Oj	8,467	23.16%
Independent	Lucas, Ronilo	8,415	23.16%
PDP–Laban	Tutaan, Victor	5,219	14.36%
Independent	Rebolledo, Victor 2nd	3,271	9.01%
Independent	Cadiz, Nieto	1,808	4.98%
Independent	Cacanindin, Zaldy	1,520	4.18%
Total votes			

=== San Pablo ===
As of May 13, 2022, 100.00% precincts have reported.

San Pablo Mayoralty Elections
Party	Candidate	Votes	%
PDP–Laban	Miro, Antonio Jr.	8,330	61.48%
Independent	Albano, Al	5,219	38.52%
Invalid or blank votes		0	0.00%
Total votes		13,549	100.00%

San Pablo Vice Mayoralty Elections
Party	Candidate	Votes	%
Lakas	Miro, Antonio Jose III	9,740	73.05%
Independent	Baccay, Mags	3,593	26.95%
Invalid or blank votes		0	0.00%
Total votes		13,333	100.00%

2022 San Pablo Municipal Council Elections
Party	Candidate	Votes	%
NPC	Rance, Jannina	10,147	69.96%
Aksyon	Lim-Gollayan, Mon	10,077	69.48%
NPC	Cureg, Cherry	8,614	59.39%
Lakas	Valdepeñas, William Carl	7,973	54.97%
Aksyon	Cammayo, Samson	7,443	51.32%
Independent	Serrano, Mark Joseff	7,046	48.58%
NPC	Malayao, Allan	7,043	48.56%
Aksyon	Balabbo, Leo Yule	6,655	45.89%
Lakas	Tumaliuan, Santiago Jr.	6,367	43.90%
Independent	Tumaliuan, Marku	6,339	43.71%
Independent	Cammayo, Jun	5,673	39.12%
Independent	Macapallag, Alquine	3,626	25.00%
Independent	Cauan, John Paul	2,640	18.20%
Independent	Manguba, Gregorio	1,995	13.76%
Independent	Vinarao, Panfilo	658	4.54%
Independent	Lorenzana, Marvin	350	2.41%
Total votes			

=== Santa Maria ===
As of May 13, 2022, 100.00% precincts have reported.

Santa Maria Mayoralty Elections
Party	Candidate	Votes	%
Lakas	Pagauitan, Hilario	8,687	59.62%
PFP	Masigan, Danny	5,884	40.38%
Invalid or blank votes		0	0.00%
Total votes		14,571	100.00%

Santa Maria Vice Mayoralty Elections
Party	Candidate	Votes	%
Lakas	Pagauitan, Mike	8,425	60.00%
Reporma	Mansibang, Oscar	4,694	33.43%
PFP	Masigan, Benny	923	6.57%
Invalid or blank votes		0	0.00%
Total votes		14,042	100.00%

2022 Santa Maria Municipal Council Elections
Party	Candidate	Votes	%
Lakas	Pagauitan, Isaac	8,019	51.79%
Lakas	Samus, Federico	7,906	51.06%
Lakas	Laggui, Irish	6,923	44.71%
NPC	Gatan, Ricky	6,747	43.57%
Lakas	Martinez, Bobit	6,143	39.67%
Lakas	Formoso, Jek	6,013	38.83%
Lakas	Datul, Errol	5,694	36.77%
Independent	Masigan, Carol	5,188	33.51%
Aksyon	Baui, Lou	5,078	32.80%
Lakas	Panganiban, Peterson	4,413	28.50%
NPC	Laggui, Hilario	3,676	23.74%
PFP	Aggabao, John-paul	3,238	20.91%
PFP	Vinarao, Larry	3,181	20.54%
Independent	Palma, Albino	3,075	19.86%
NPC	Uy, Antonio	2,911	18.80%
Lakas	Jose, Orencio	2,906	18.77%
PFP	Cureg, Joeffrey	2,901	18.74%
Aksyon	Laggui, Rogelio	2,778	17.94%
Independent	Cureg, Ferdinand	2,415	15.60%
Independent	Masigan, Regal	2,411	15.57%
Independent	Siriegan, Jay	2,240	14.47%
Independent	Cabaddu, Rolando	1,877	12.12%
PFP	Artates, Gloria	1,589	10.26%
Independent	Masigan, Bong	1,115	7.20%
PFP	Mansibang, Oscar	635	4.10%
Total votes			

=== Santo Tomas ===
As of May 13, 2022, 100.00% precincts have reported.

Santo Tomas Mayoralty Elections
Party	Candidate	Votes	%
Lakas	Talaue, Antonio	9,885	83.42%
Reporma	Zipagan, Maximo	1,964	16.58%
Invalid or blank votes		0	0.00%
Total votes		11,849	100.00%

Santo Tomas Vice Mayoralty Elections
Party	Candidate	Votes	%
Lakas	Talaue, Amado	7,231	61.20%
Reporma	Buraga, Vilma	4,584	38.80%
Invalid or blank votes		0	0.00%
Total votes		11,815	100.00%

2022 Santo Tomas Municipal Council Elections
Party	Candidate	Votes	%
Lakas	Talaue, Rona Lulu	8,373	63.47%
Independent	Pua, Eduardo Jr.	7,636	57.88%
Lakas	Talaue, Jose Amado	7,633	57.86%
Lakas	Lopez, Armando	7,595	57.57%
Lakas	Talaue, Eduardo Jr.	7,212	54.67%
Reporma	Canceran, Jesus	6,077	46.06%
NUP	Angolluan, Marirose	5,967	45.23%
Aksyon	Tallion, Sonny	5,475	41.50%
NUP	Soriano, Rosemarie	5,092	38.60%
Independent	Acido, Arthur	2,576	19.53%
Reporma	Baxa, Rey Emmanuel	2,449	18.56%
Independent	Datul, Rito	2,271	17.21%
Reporma	Paguigan, Ignacio	2,139	16.21%
Aksyon	Principe, Ma.Elizabeth	2,009	15.91%
Reporma	Viernes, Santos	1,957	14.83%
Reporma	Zipagan, Victorino	1,748	13.25%
Reporma	Magundayao, Marlene	1,000	7.58%
Reporma	Acerit, Veronica	957	7.25%
Independent	Deculing, Rosanne	372	2.82%
Total votes			

=== Tumauini ===
As of May 13, 2022, 100.00% precincts have reported.

Tumauini Mayoralty Elections
Party	Candidate	Votes	%
Lakas	Bautista, Venus	26,591	100.00%
Invalid or blank votes		0	0.00%
Total votes		26,591	100.00%

Tumauini Vice Mayoralty Elections
Party	Candidate	Votes	%
Lakas	Uy, Christopher	17,759	52.54%
Independent	De Alban, Mark Anthony	15,654	46.32%
Independent	Gaspar, Armando	384	1.14%
Invalid or blank votes		0	0.00%
Total votes		33,796	100.00%

2022 Tumauini Municipal Council Elections
Party	Candidate	Votes	%
Lakas	Bautista, Sharina Lu	23,924	64.31%
PROMDI	Guiyab, Major	19,635	52.78%
Lakas	Gardon, Luigi	18,709	50.29%
Aksyon	Ugaddan, Romeo	18,438	49.57%
Independent	De Alban, Marvin Francis	17,064	45.87%
Lakas	Dammog, Rogelio	16,618	44.67%
Aksyon	Taccad, Ferdinand	16,006	43.03%
Aksyon	Binalay, Rostum	15,487	41.63%
Lakas	Ferrer, Marcial	14,537	39.08%
Lakas	Uy, Johnny	12,028	32.33%
Lakas	Pua, James	11,683	31.41%
Independent	Pintucan, Maribel	10,679	28.71%
Independent	Gaspar, Arsenio	10,370	27.88%
Independent	Padillo, Maricon	9,213	24.77%
Independent	Managuelod, Reyvin	3,773	10.14%
Total votes			
