= Sara Duterte 2028 presidential campaign =

Filipino political campaign

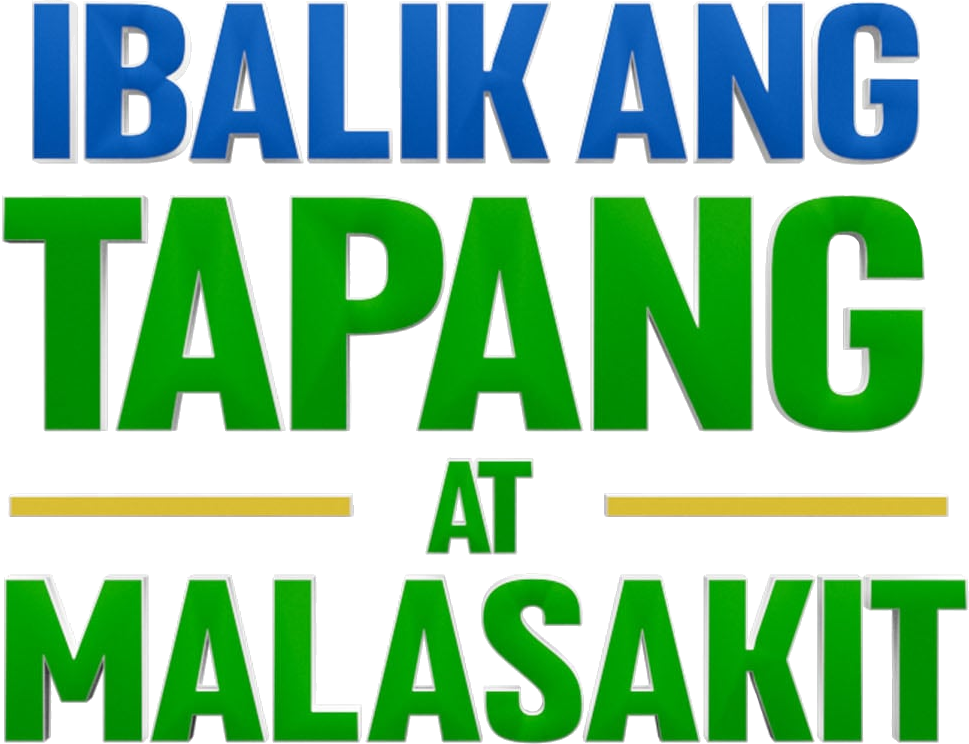
- Campaign: 2028 Philippine presidential election
- Candidate: Sara Duterte; Vice President of the Philippines (since 2022); Secretary of Education (2022–2024); Mayor of Davao City (2010–2013; 2016–2022); Vice Mayor of Davao City (2013–2016)
- Affiliation: Hugpong ng Pagbabago
- Status: Announced: February 18, 2026
- Slogan(s): Ibalik ang Tapang at Malasakit! (transl. Bring back courage and compassion!)

The 2028 presidential campaign of Sara Duterte, the 15th and incumbent vice president of the Philippines, began when she announced her candidacy for the 2028 Philippine presidential election on February 18, 2026. Her campaign is expected to formally begin by late 2027 after the filing of certificates of candidacy.

Duterte is the first candidate to officially declare her bid for the presidency in the 2028 elections.

== Background ==
=== Collapse of the Marcos–Duterte alliance ===
Sara Duterte is the incumbent vice president of the Philippines and the daughter of former president Rodrigo Duterte. She took part at the 2022 election as Bongbong Marcos' vice presidential candidate under the UniTeam electoral alliance.

The alliance between Marcos and the younger Duterte began to deteriorate. In May 2023, Duterte left the Lakas–CMD party of Marcos' cousin and then House Speaker Martin Romualdez. Duterte resigned from her position as secretary of the Department of Education and vice chairperson of the National Task Force to End Local Communist Armed Conflict in June 2024. In November 2024, Duterte threatened Marcos stating she has hired an assassin to kill the president in the event that she were to be killed. The Marcos administration allowed the arrest of Rodrigo Duterte to face charges in the International Criminal Court (ICC).

=== Impeachment efforts ===
Duterte was impeached on February 5, 2025 by the House of Representatives. However, the Supreme Court released a ruling in July 2025 which halted the trial which prevented Duterte's removal from office.

In February 2026, Duterte is facing new impeachment complaints after the one-year ban provision lapsed.

Duterte has been facing allegations for misuse of her confidential funds (CF), non-declaration of all her assets, abuse of power, bribery of officials, and for her threats against the lives of President Marcos, First Lady Liza Araneta-Marcos and former Speaker Romualdez.

A guilty verdict by the Senate acting as an impeachment court will disqualify Sara Duterte from running for office (as well as being appointed to any government position, in any capacity). Marcos himself is ineligible for re-election as the president is constitutionally limited to serve a single six-year term.

Duterte was impeached again by the House on May 11, 2026, under the charges of misusing public funds and threatening to kill President Marcos.

== Pre-campaign ==
=== Announcement ===
I offer my life, my strength and my future in the service of our nation. Fellow countrymen, let us restore courage and concern for God, for the nation and for each Filipino family. I am Sara Duterte, running for president of the Philippines, Shukran. (Note: Original Tagalog quote: I offer my life, my strength, and my future in the service of the nation. Mga kababayan, ibalik natin ang tapang at malasakit para sa diyos, sa bayan at para sa bawat pamilyang Pilipino. Ako si Sara Duterte, tatakbong bilang pangulo ng Pilipinas, Shukran.)

— Sara Duterte, Sara Duterte's closing remarks of her speech announcing her presidential run In a press conference on February 18, 2026.

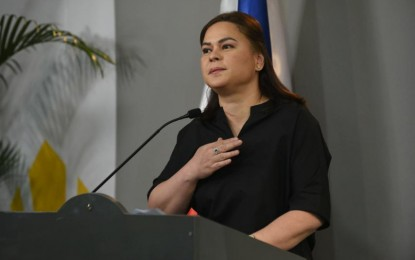
Duterte announcing her candidacy on February 18, 2026.

Duterte officially announced her candidacy for president in a press conference at the headquarters of the Office of the Vice President in Mandaluyong on February 18, 2026. Duterte then apologized for her support of Marcos in 2022.

=== Potential vice presidential candidate ===
Two days after the announcement, PDP Spokesman Raul Lambino saw potential on Baguio City Mayor Benjamin Magalong as her running mate. But Magalong rejected it and ruled out a 2028 run.

Senator Robin Padilla has proposed his colleague and elder sister of current president, Imee Marcos to be Duterte's vice presidential candidate for 2028. Imee Marcos in response stated that Duterte has always been her "running mate". On February 21, 2026, Duterte said in an interview with SMNI program Vox Populi that she already chose her running mate last year but won't reveal their name yet. On March 14, 2026, Duterte said that the person she recruited as her running mate hasn't made a final decision that they want to run for Vice President. On May 4, 2026, Marcos ruled out any speculation of her being the running mate and wishes to complete her last term as senator.

=== Senate slate ===
Duterte revealed that former COA and COMELEC commissioner Rowena Guanzon and 3 others have expressed their interests in joining Duterte's senatorial slate. On April 9, 2026, Duterte stated that is still no official senate slate as the current political climate has made it difficult to publicly align with potential allies.

== Endorsements ==
Sara Duterte

Former Philippine presidents

- Rodrigo Duterte, 16th president of the Philippines (2016–2022), candidate's father

Former Cabinet officials

- Harry Roque, presidential spokesperson (2017–2018; 2020–2021)

Current Philippine senators

- Robin Padilla, senator (2022–present)
- Imee Marcos, senator (2019–present)
- Bong Go, senator (2019–present)

Current and former members of the Philippine House of Representatives

- Bong Suntay, 4th district representative of Quezon City (2019–2022; 2025–present)
- Jacinto Paras, former 1st district representative of Negros Oriental (1998–2007)
- Isidro Ungab, 3rd district representative of Davao City (2007–2016; 2019–present)
- Harold Duterte, representative for Puwersa ng Pilipinong Pandagat (2025–present)
- Bernadette Herrera, former Representative for Bagong Henerasyon (2010–2013; 2016–2025)
- Kiko Barzaga, former 4th district representative of Cavite (2025–2026)
- Pantaleon Alvarez, former Speaker of the House of Representatives of the Philippines (2016–2018), former Representative of 1st District of Davao del Norte (1998–2001; 2016–2025)

Current and former local officials

- Michelle Nakpil Rabat, mayor of Mati, Davao Oriental (2007–2013; 2019–2025)
- Mike Rama, mayor of Cebu City (2010–2016; 2021–2024)
- Harold Respicio, vice mayor of Reina Mercedes, Isabela (2025–present)
- Sebastian Duterte, mayor of Davao City (2022–present)
- Rigo Duterte, vice mayor of Davao City (2025–present)
- Arturo Uy, former governor of Davao de Oro (2007–2016)

Public personalities

- Jimmy Bondoc, musician
- Aiko Melendez, actress and member of the Quezon City Council (2001–2010; 2022–present)
- Rowena Guanzon, former COMELEC commissioner

Organizations

- Masa-Sara Duterte Alliance (MASADA)
- Tatay Digong for Inday Sara Movement 2028
- One Bangsamoro Movement (1Bangsa)
- Hakbang ng Maisug
- Puwersa ng Pilipinong Pandagat
- Sara Duterte for President Movement

Political parties

- Hugpong ng Pagbabago
- Partido Demokratiko Pilipino
- Partido Barug
- Partido Reporma
- Pederalismo ng Dugong Dakilang Samahan
