= 2025 Philippine House of Representatives elections in Cagayan Valley =

- May 12, 2025
- All 12 Cagayan Valley seats in the House of Representatives
Party	Seats	+/–
Lakas	9	+6
PFP	1	+1
Aksyon	1	New
NPC	1	−3
This lists parties that won seats. See the complete results below.

The 2025 Philippine House of Representatives elections in Cagayan Valley were held on May 12, 2025, as part of the 2025 Philippine general election.

== Summary ==
Congressional district	Incumbent	Incumbent's party	Winner	Winner's party	Winning margin
Batanes	Jun Gato	NPC	Jun Gato	NPC	32.20%
Cagayan–1st	Ramon Nolasco Jr.	Lakas	Ramon Nolasco	Lakas	16.54%
Cagayan–2nd	Baby Alfonso	Lakas	Baby Alfonso	Lakas	21.43%
Cagayan–3rd	Joseph Lara	Lakas	Joseph Lara	Lakas	20.84%
Isabela–1st	Tonypet Albano	Lakas	Tonypet Albano	Lakas	Unopposed
Isabela–2nd	Ed Christopher Go	Lakas	Ed Christopher Go	Lakas	Unopposed
Isabela–3rd	Ian Paul Dy	Lakas	Ian Paul Dy	Lakas	Unopposed
Isabela–4th	Joseph Tan	Lakas	Joseph Tan	Lakas	47.48%
Isabela–5th	Mike Dy III	Lakas	Mike Dy III	Lakas	Unopposed
Isabela–6th	Inno Dy	Lakas	Faustino Dy III	PFP	Unopposed
Nueva Vizcaya	Luisa Cuaresma	UNA	Tim Cayton	Aksyon	9.53%
Quirino	Midy Cua	Lakas	Midy Cua	Lakas	Unopposed

== Batanes ==
2025 Batanes's at-large congressional district election
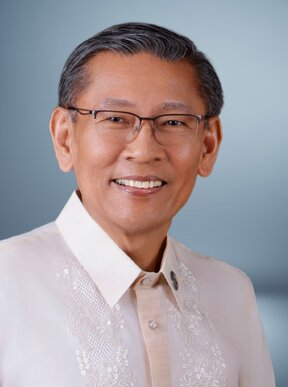

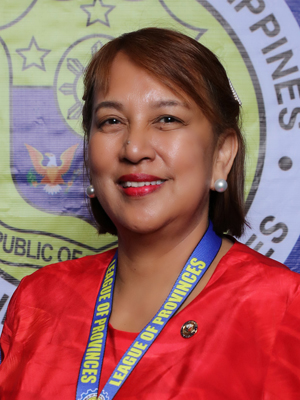
Candidate	Jun Gato	Marilou Cayco
Party	NPC	PFP
Popular vote	7,380	3,785
Percentage	66.10%	33.90%
House representative before election
Jun Gato
NPC
Elected House representative
Jun Gato
NPC

Incumbent Jun Gato of the Nationalist People's Coalition ran for a third term.

Gato won re-election against Batanes governor Marilou Cayco (Partido Federal ng Pilipinas).

Candidate	Party	Votes	%
Jun Gato (incumbent)	Nationalist People's Coalition	7,380	66.10
Marilou Cayco	Partido Federal ng Pilipinas	3,785	33.90
Total		11,165	100.00
Valid votes		11,165	97.19
Invalid/blank votes		323	2.81
Total votes		11,488	100.00
Registered voters/turnout		13,655	84.13
NPC hold			
Source: Commission on Elections

== Cagayan ==
=== 1st district ===
2025 Cagayan's 1st congressional district election
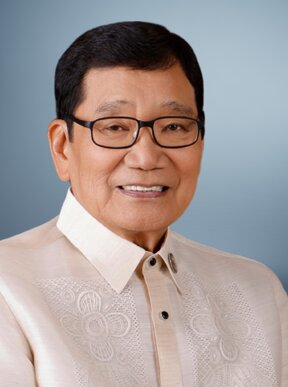
		NP
Candidate	Ramon Nolasco	Florante Pascual
Party	Lakas	Nacionalista
Popular vote	127,434	91,256
Percentage	58.27%	41.73%
House representative before election
Ramon Nolasco Jr.
NPC
Elected House representative
Ramon Nolasco
Lakas

Incumbent Ramon Nolasco Jr. of Lakas–CMD retired. He was previously affiliated with the Nationalist People's Coalition.

Lakas–CMD nominated Nolasco's father, former representative Ramon Nolasco, who won the election against Lal-lo mayor Florante Pascual (Nacionalista Party).

Candidate	Party	Votes	%
Ramon Nolasco	Lakas–CMD	127,434	58.27
Florante Pascual	Nacionalista Party	91,256	41.73
Total		218,690	100.00
Valid votes		218,690	91.08
Invalid/blank votes		21,405	8.92
Total votes		240,095	100.00
Registered voters/turnout		280,282	85.66
Lakas hold			
Source: Commission on Elections

=== 2nd district ===
2025 Cagayan's 2nd congressional district election
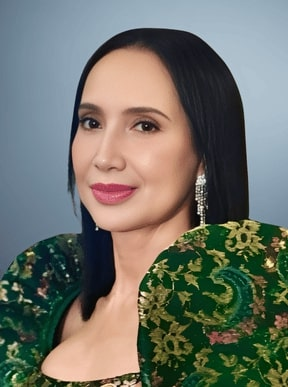
		NP	NPC
Candidate	Baby Alfonso	Harry Florida	Edgar Lara
Party	Lakas	Nacionalista	NPC
Popular vote	100,692	63,927	6,982
Percentage	58.68%	37.35%	4.07%
House representative before election
Baby Alfonso
Lakas
Elected House representative
Baby Alfonso
Lakas

Incumbent Baby Alfonso of Lakas–CMD ran for a second term.

Alfonso won re-election against Allacapan mayor Harry Florida (Nacionalista Party) and former Cagayan governor Edgar Lara (Nationalist People's Coalition).

Candidate	Party	Votes	%
Baby Alfonso (incumbent)	Lakas–CMD	100,692	58.68
Harry Florida	Nacionalista Party	63,927	37.25
Edgar Lara	Nationalist People's Coalition	6,982	4.07
Total		171,601	100.00
Valid votes		171,601	95.26
Invalid/blank votes		8,532	4.74
Total votes		180,133	100.00
Registered voters/turnout		210,751	85.47
Lakas hold			
Source: Commission on Elections

=== 3rd district ===
2025 Cagayan's 3rd congressional district election
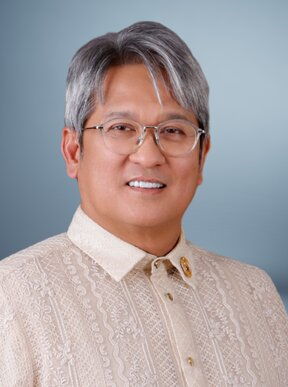

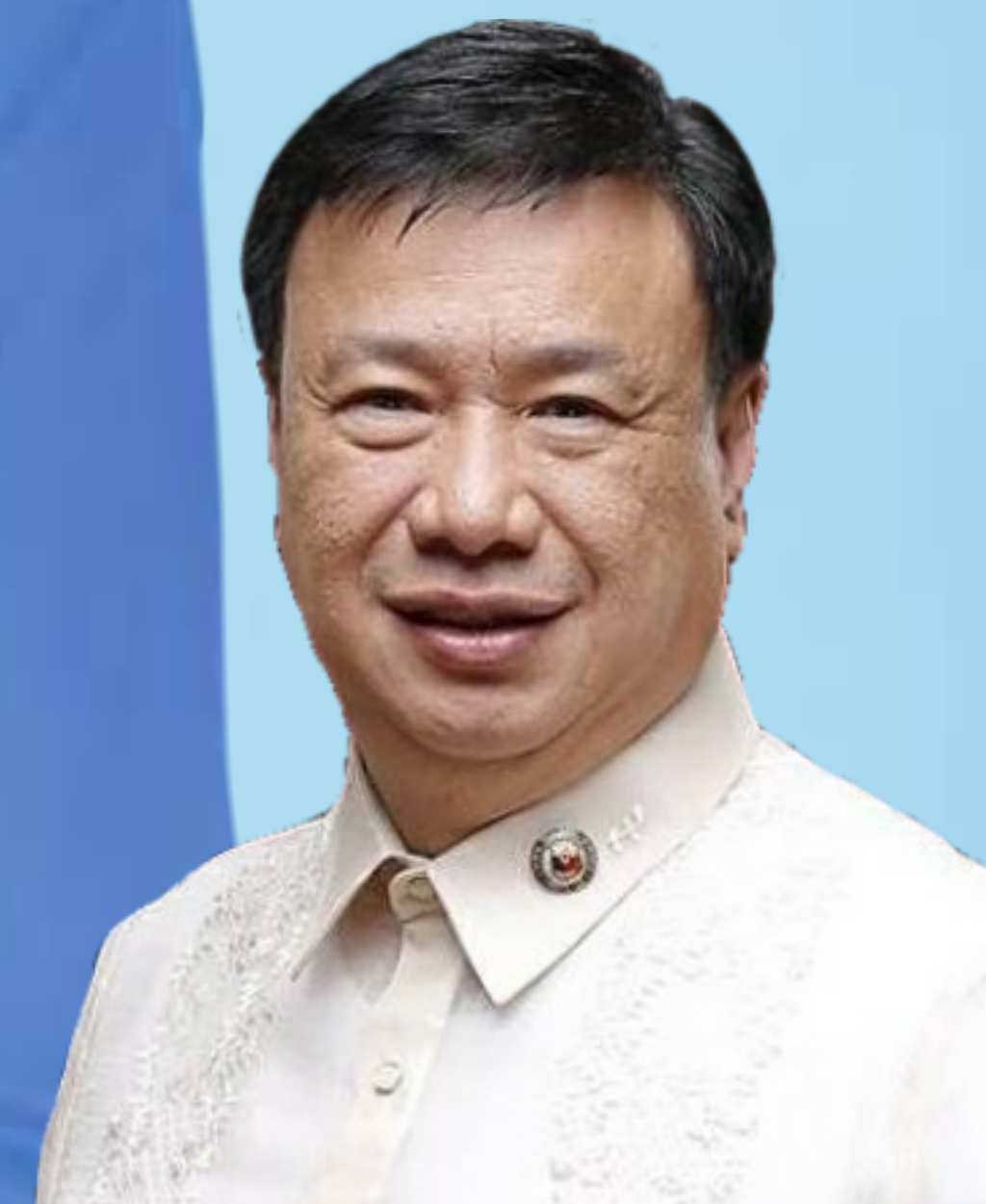
Candidate	Joseph Lara	Randolph Ting
Party	Lakas	NUP
Popular vote	144,276	94,508
Percentage	60.42%	39.58%
House representative before election
Joseph Lara
PDP–Laban
Elected House representative
Joseph Lara
Lakas

Incumbent Joseph Lara of Lakas–CMD ran for a third term. He was previously affiliated with PDP–Laban.

Lara won re-election against former representative Randolph Ting (National Unity Party).

Candidate	Party	Votes	%
Joseph Lara (incumbent)	Lakas–CMD	144,276	60.42
Randolph Ting	National Unity Party	94,508	39.58
Total		238,784	100.00
Valid votes		238,784	94.07
Invalid/blank votes		15,052	5.93
Total votes		253,836	100.00
Registered voters/turnout		294,961	86.06
Lakas hold			
Source: Commission on Elections

== Isabela ==
=== 1st district ===
2025 Isabela's 1st district congressional election
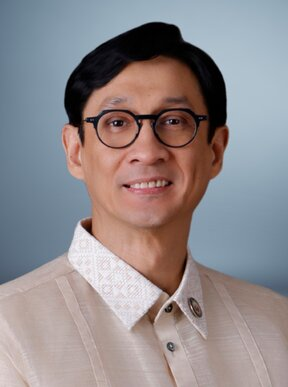
Candidate	Tonypet Albano
Party	Lakas
Popular vote	172,333
Percentage	100.00%
House representative before election
Tonypet Albano
Lakas
Elected House representative
Tonypet Albano
Lakas

Incumbent Tonypet Albano of Lakas–CMD won re-election for a third term unopposed.

Candidate	Party	Votes	%
Tonypet Albano (incumbent)	Lakas–CMD	172,333	100.00
Total		172,333	100.00
Valid votes		172,333	79.06
Invalid/blank votes		45,655	20.94
Total votes		217,988	100.00
Registered voters/turnout		265,453	82.12
Lakas hold			
Source: Commission on Elections

=== 2nd district ===
2025 Isabela's 2nd congressional district election
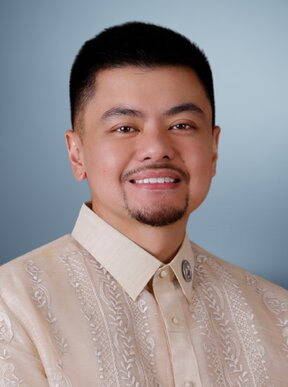
Candidate	Ed Christopher Go
Party	Lakas
Popular vote	90,186
Percentage	100.00%
House representative before election
Ed Christopher Go
Nacionalista
Elected House representative
Ed Christopher Go
Lakas

Incumbent Ed Christopher Go of Lakas–CMD won re-election for a third term unopposed. He was previously affiliated with the Nacionalista Party.

Candidate	Party	Votes	%
Ed Christopher Go (incumbent)	Lakas–CMD	90,186	100.00
Total		90,186	100.00
Valid votes		90,186	83.33
Invalid/blank votes		18,044	16.67
Total votes		108,230	100.00
Registered voters/turnout		127,579	84.83
Lakas hold			
Source: Commission on Elections

=== 3rd district ===
2025 Isabela's 3rd congressional district election
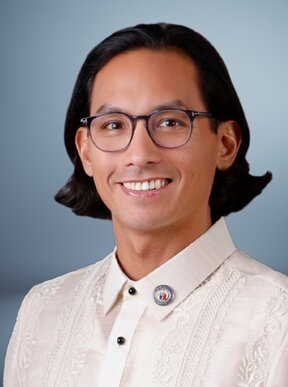
Candidate	Ian Paul Dy
Party	Lakas
Popular vote	118,333
Percentage	100.00%
House representative before election
Ian Paul Dy
NPC
Elected House representative
Ian Paul Dy
Lakas

Incumbent Ian Paul Dy of Lakas–CMD won re-election for a third term unopposed. He was previously affiliated with the Nationalist People's Coalition.

Candidate	Party	Votes	%
Ian Paul Dy (incumbent)	Lakas–CMD	118,333	100.00
Total		118,333	100.00
Valid votes		118,333	77.39
Invalid/blank votes		34,570	22.61
Total votes		152,903	100.00
Registered voters/turnout		180,353	84.78
Lakas hold			
Source: Commission on Elections

=== 4th district ===
2025 Isabela's 4th congressional district election
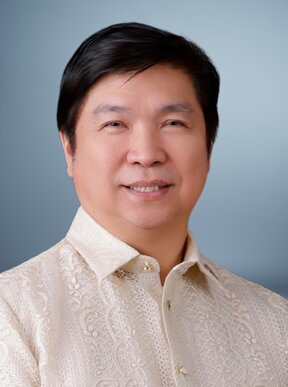

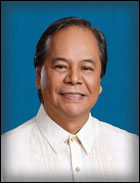
Candidate	Joseph Tan	Giorgidi Aggabao
Party	Lakas	NPC
Popular vote	112,993	39,908
Percentage	73.40%	25.92%
House representative before election
Joseph Tan
PDP–Laban
Elected House representative
Joseph Tan
Lakas

Incumbent Joseph Tan of Lakas–CMD ran for a second term. He was previously

affiliated with PDP–Laban.

Tan won re-election against former representative Giorgidi Aggabao (Nationalist People's Coalition) and Jeany Coquilla (PDP–Laban).

Candidate	Party	Votes	%
Joseph Tan (incumbent)	Lakas–CMD	112,993	73.40
Giorgidi Aggabao	Nationalist People's Coalition	39,908	25.92
Jeany Coquilla	PDP–Laban	1,043	0.68
Total		153,944	100.00
Valid votes		153,944	92.75
Invalid/blank votes		12,029	7.25
Total votes		165,973	100.00
Registered voters/turnout		196,747	84.36
Lakas hold			
Source: Commission on Elections

=== 5th district ===
2025 Isabela's 5th congressional district election
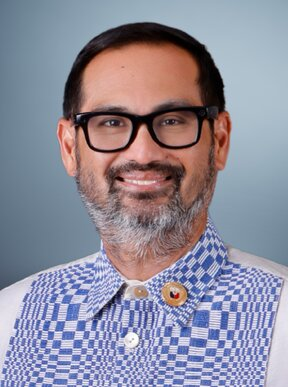
Candidate	Mike Dy III
Party	Lakas
Popular vote	98,151
Percentage	100.00%
House representative before election
Mike Dy III
NPC
Elected House representative
Mike Dy III
Lakas

Incumbent Mike Dy III of Lakas–CMD won re-election for a third term unopposed. He was previously affiliated with the Nationalist People's Coalition.

Candidate	Party	Votes	%
Mike Dy III (incumbent)	Lakas–CMD	98,151	100.00
Total		98,151	100.00
Valid votes		98,151	66.79
Invalid/blank votes		48,808	33.21
Total votes		146,959	100.00
Registered voters/turnout		172,212	85.34
Lakas hold			
Source: Commission on Elections

=== 6th district ===
2025 Isabela's 6th congressional district election
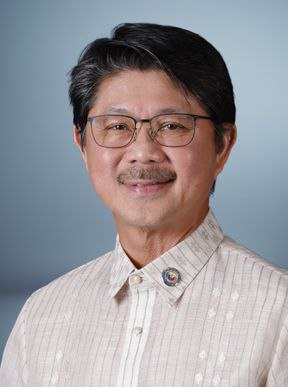
Candidate	Faustino "Bojie" Dy III
Party	PFP
Popular vote	129,097
Percentage	100.00%
House representative before election
Inno Dy
PDP–Laban
Elected House representative
Faustino "Bojie" Dy III
PFP

Incumbent Inno Dy of Lakas–CMD retired to run for mayor of Echague. He was previously affiliated with PDP–Laban.

Dy endorsed his father, Isabela vice governor Faustino Dy III (Partido Federal ng Pilipinas), who won the election unopposed.

Candidate	Party	Votes	%
Faustino Dy III	Partido Federal ng Pilipinas	129,097	100.00
Total		129,097	100.00
Valid votes		129,097	84.50
Invalid/blank votes		23,679	15.50
Total votes		152,776	100.00
Registered voters/turnout		183,197	83.39
PFP gain from Lakas			
Source: Commission on Elections

== Nueva Vizcaya ==
2025 Nueva Vizcaya's at-large congressional district election
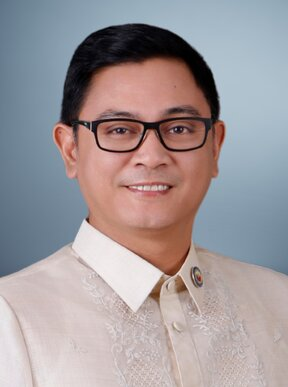

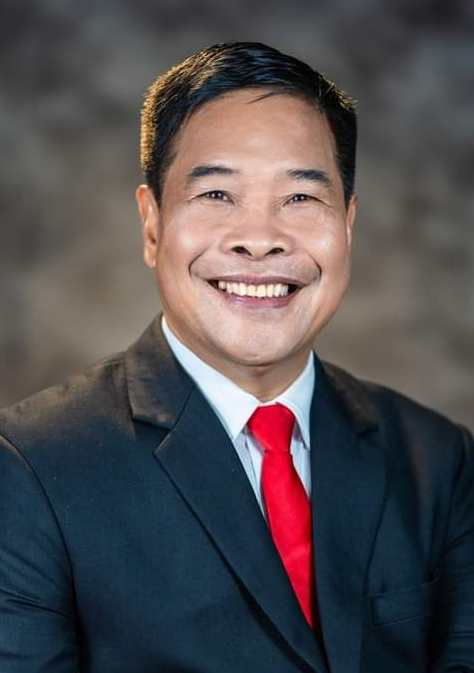

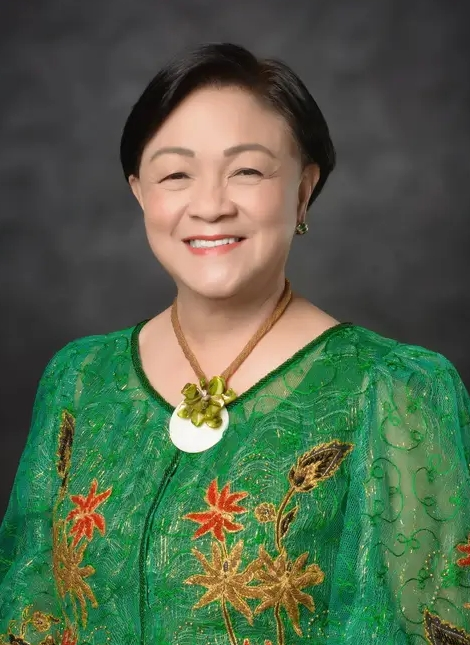
Candidate	Tim Cayton	Tam-an Tomas	Ruth Padilla
Party	Aksyon	Lakas	Nacionalista
Popular vote	100,291	76,698	57,482
Percentage	40.52%	30.99%	23.22%
House representative before election
Luisa Cuaresma
UNA
Elected House representative
Tim Cayton
Aksyon

Term-limited incumbent Luisa Cuaresma of the United Nationalist Alliance ran for governor of Nueva Vizcaya.

Cuaresma endorsed provincial board member Tam-an Tomas of Lakas–CMD, who was defeated by Dupax del Norte mayor Tim Cayton of Aksyon Demokratiko. Former Nueva Vizcaya governor Ruth Padilla (Nacionalista Party) and four other candidates also ran for representative.

Candidate	Party	Votes	%
Tim Cayton	Aksyon Demokratiko	100,291	40.52
Tam-an Tomas	Lakas–CMD	76,698	30.99
Ruth Padilla	Nacionalista Party	57,482	23.22
Val de Leon	Independent	8,597	3.47
Jun Manghi	Independent	2,625	1.06
Jay Padilla	Independent	1,670	0.67
Lawrence Santa Ana	Independent	165	0.07
Total		247,528	100.00
Valid votes		247,528	95.85
Invalid/blank votes		10,721	4.15
Total votes		258,249	100.00
Registered voters/turnout		303,090	85.21
Aksyon gain from UNA			
Source: Commission on Elections

== Quirino ==
2025 Quirino's at-large congressional district election
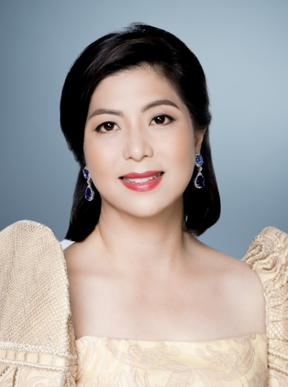
Candidate	Midy Cua
Party	Lakas
Popular vote	97,151
Percentage	100.00%
House representative before election
Midy Cua
PDDS
Elected House representative
Midy Cua
Lakas

Incumbent Midy Cua of Lakas–CMD won re-election for a second term unopposed. She was previously affiliated with Pederalismo ng Dugong Dakilang Samahan.

Candidate	Party	Votes	%
Midy Cua (incumbent)	Lakas–CMD	97,151	100.00
Total		97,151	100.00
Valid votes		97,151	86.50
Invalid/blank votes		15,159	13.50
Total votes		112,310	100.00
Registered voters/turnout		130,307	86.19
Lakas hold			
Source: Commission on Elections
