= 2022 Philippine House of Representatives elections in Cagayan Valley =

- May 9, 2022
- All 12 Cagayan Valley seats in the House of Representatives
Party	Seats	+/–
NPC	4	+2
Lakas	3	+3
PDP–Laban	3	−2
Nacionalista	1	0
PDDS	1	+1
This lists parties that won seats. See the complete results below.

The 2022 Philippine House of Representatives elections in Cagayan Valley were held on May 9, 2022.

== Summary ==
Congressional district	Incumbent	Incumbent's party	Winner	Winner's party	Winning margin
Batanes	Jun Gato	NPC	Jun Gato	NPC	7.31%
Cagayan–1st	Ramon Nolasco Jr.	NPC	Ramon Nolasco Jr.	NPC	19.16%
Cagayan–2nd	Samantha Louise Vargas-Alfonso	NUP	Baby Alfonso	Lakas	80.54%
Cagayan–3rd	Joseph Lara	PDP–Laban	Joseph Lara	PDP–Laban	30.73%
Isabela–1st	Tonypet Albano	Lakas	Tonypet Albano	Lakas	95.20%
Isabela–2nd	Ed Christopher Go	Nacionalista	Ed Christopher Go	Nacionalista	71.93%
Isabela–3rd	Ian Paul Dy	NPC	Ian Paul Dy	NPC	Unopposed
Isabela–4th	Sheena Tan	PDP–Laban	Joseph Tan	PDP–Laban	53.56%
Isabela–5th	Mike Dy III	NPC	Mike Dy III	NPC	34.85%
Isabela–6th	Inno Dy	PDP–Laban	Inno Dy	PDP–Laban	81.66%
Nueva Vizcaya	Luisa Cuaresma	Lakas	Luisa Cuaresma	Lakas	45.11%
Quirino	Junie Cua	PDDS	Midy Cua	PDDS	88.18%

== Batanes ==
Incumbent Jun Gato of the Nationalist People's Coalition ran for a second term.

Gato won re-election against former Secretary of Budget and Management Florencio Abad's son Luis Abad (Liberal Party), Ronald Aguto Jr. (Partido para sa Demokratikong Reporma) and former representative Carlo Oliver Diasnes (Lakas–CMD).

Candidate	Party	Votes	%
Jun Gato (incumbent)	Nationalist People's Coalition	3,872	33.92
Luis Abad	Liberal Party	3,037	26.61
Ronald Aguto Jr.	Partido para sa Demokratikong Reporma	2,484	21.76
Carlo Oliver Diasnes	Lakas–CMD	2,022	17.71
Total		11,415	100.00
Total votes		11,801	–
Registered voters/turnout		13,820	85.39
NPC hold			
Source: Commission on Elections

== Cagayan ==
=== 1st district ===
Incumbent Ramon Nolasco Jr. of the Nationalist People's Coalition ran for a second term. He was previously affiliated with PDP–Laban.

Nolasco won re-election against former Senator Juan Ponce Enrile's daughter Katrina Ponce Enrile (Lakas–CMD) and Robert Damian (Nacionalista Party).

Candidate	Party	Votes	%
Ramon Nolasco Jr. (incumbent)	Nationalist People's Coalition	115,801	57.35
Katrina Ponce Enrile	Lakas–CMD	77,116	38.19
Roberto Damian	Nacionalista Party	9,005	4.46
Total		201,922	100.00
Total votes		233,283	–
Registered voters/turnout		271,961	85.78
NPC hold			
Source: Commission on Elections

=== 2nd district ===
Incumbent Samantha Louise Vargas-Alfonso of the National Unity Party retired.

Vargas-Alfonso endorsed her mother, former representative Baby Alfonso (Lakas–CMD), who won the election against two other candidates.

Candidate	Party	Votes	%
Baby Alfonso	Lakas–CMD	123,428	89.63
James Bryan Sacramed	Nacionalista Party	12,515	9.09
Melvin Capili	Partido Federal ng Pilipinas	1,766	1.28
Total		137,709	100.00
Total votes		175,143	–
Registered voters/turnout		209,121	83.75
Lakas gain from NUP			
Source: Commission on Elections

=== 3rd district ===
Incumbent Joseph Lara of PDP–Laban ran for a second term.

Lara won re-election against Cagayan governor Manuel Mamba's wife Mabel Mamba (Nacionalista Party) and Diamond Jugarap (Independent).

Candidate	Party	Votes	%
Joseph Lara (incumbent)	PDP–Laban	147,669	65.17
Mabel Mamba	Nacionalista Party	78,033	34.44
Diamond Jugarap	Independent	894	0.39
Total		226,596	100.00
Total votes		245,209	–
Registered voters/turnout		284,936	86.06
PDP–Laban hold			
Source: Commission on Elections

== Isabela ==
=== 1st district ===
Incumbent Tonypet Albano of Lakas–CMD ran for a second term. He was previously affiliated with PDP–Laban.

Albano won re-election against Stephen Soliven (Independent).

Candidate	Party	Votes	%
Tonypet Albano (incumbent)	Lakas–CMD	176,265	97.60
Stephen Soliven	Independent	4,337	2.40
Total		180,602	100.00
Total votes		212,416	–
Registered voters/turnout		259,291	81.92
Lakas hold			
Source: Commission on Elections

=== 2nd district ===
Incumbent Ed Christopher Go of the Nacionalista Party ran for a second term.

Go won re-election against three other candidates.

Candidate	Party	Votes	%
Ed Christopher Go (incumbent)	Nacionalista Party	80,841	85.35
Jeryll Harold Respicio	Independent	12,711	13.42
Faustino Reyes	Kilusang Bagong Lipunan	588	0.62
Elizabeth Magora	Philippine Green Republican Party	581	0.61
Total		94,721	100.00
Total votes		107,078	–
Registered voters/turnout		126,619	84.57
Nacionalista hold			
Source: Commission on Elections

=== 3rd district ===
Incumbent Ian Paul Dy of the Nationalist People's Coalition won re-election for a second term unopposed.

Candidate	Party	Votes	%
Ian Paul Dy (incumbent)	Nationalist People's Coalition	113,838	100.00
Total		113,838	100.00
Total votes		152,023	–
Registered voters/turnout		179,384	84.75
NPC hold			
Source: Commission on Elections

=== 4th district ===
Incumbent Sheena Tan of PDP–Laban ran for mayor of Santiago. She was previously affiliated with the Partido Federal ng Pilipinas.

PDP–Laban nominated Tan's uncle, Santiago mayor Joseph Tan, who won the election against four other candidates.

Candidate	Party	Votes	%
Joseph Tan	PDP–Laban	106,651	74.90
Jeany Coquilla	Pederalismo ng Dugong Dakilang Samahan	30,392	21.34
Lucas Florentino	Nationalist People's Coalition	2,855	2.01
Monching Espiritu	Partido para sa Demokratikong Reporma	1,421	1.00
Ellen Gabriel	Independent	1,070	0.75
Total		142,389	100.00
Total votes		159,503	–
Registered voters/turnout		192,229	82.98
PDP–Laban hold			
Source: Commission on Elections

=== 5th district ===
Incumbent Mike Dy III of the Nationalist People's Coalition ran for a second term. He was previously affiliated with the Partido Federal ng Pilipinas.

Dy won re-election against two other candidates.

Candidate	Party	Votes	%
Mike Dy III (incumbent)	Nationalist People's Coalition	82,062	66.47
Kristin Uy	PDP–Laban	39,038	31.62
Gilbert San Pedro	PDP–Laban	2,353	1.91
Total		123,453	100.00
Total votes		146,019	–
Registered voters/turnout		174,976	83.45
NPC hold			
Source: Commission on Elections

=== 6th district ===
Incumbent Inno Dy of PDP–Laban ran for a second term.

Dy won re-election against Armando Velasco (PROMDI).

Candidate	Party	Votes	%
Inno Dy (incumbent)	PDP–Laban	121,381	90.83
Armando Velasco	PROMDI	12,255	9.17
Total		133,636	100.00
Total votes		150,105	–
Registered voters/turnout		180,359	83.23
PDP–Laban hold			
Source: Commission on Elections

== Nueva Vizcaya ==
Incumbent Luisa Cuaresma of Lakas–CMD ran for a third term. She was previously affiliated with the National Unity Party.

Cuaresma won re-election against provincial board member Flodemonte Gerdan (Nacionalista Party) and Lawrence Santa Ana (Independent).

Candidate	Party	Votes	%
Luisa Cuaresma (incumbent)	Lakas–CMD	165,360	72.25
Flodemonte Gerdan	Nacionalista Party	62,115	27.14
Lawrence Santa Ana	Independent	1,388	0.61
Total		228,863	100.00
Total votes		252,486	–
Registered voters/turnout		296,233	85.23
Lakas hold			
Source: Commission on Elections

== Quirino ==
Incumbent Junie Cua of Pederalismo ng Dugong Dakilang Samahan (PDDS) retired. She was previously affiliated with PDP–Laban.

The PDDS nominated Cua's daughter-in-law, Midy Cua, who won the election against Vic Senica (Independent).

Candidate	Party	Votes	%
Midy Cua	Pederalismo ng Dugong Dakilang Samahan	88,864	94.09
Vic Senica	Independent	5,582	5.91
Total		94,446	100.00
Total votes		106,416	–
Registered voters/turnout		123,868	85.91
PDDS hold			
Source: Commission on Elections
