= RAGE Coalition =

Philippine political coalition founded in 2026

Reform Alliance for Accountability, Good Governance and Ethics Coalition
- Abbreviation: RAGE Coalition
- Leader: Sebastian Duterte
- Founders: Sebastian Duterte; Pantaleon Alvarez; Mike Defensor
- Founded: April 12, 2026; 7 months ago
- Preceded by: DuterTen (senate coalition)
- Ideology: Dutertismo; Populism; Federalism; Reformism; Sinophilia
- Political position: Right-wing to far-right
- Coalition members: PDP–Laban; Reporma; Reform PH; HNP
- Colors: Red

The Reform Alliance for Accountability, Good Governance, and Ethics Coalition, originally named as the Reform Alliance for Good Governance and Accountability Coalition, or known as the RAGE Coalition, is a major national opposition political coalition in the Philippines formed in 2026 by the supporters of former president Rodrigo Duterte and his administration, as well as by Vice President Sara Duterte and her 2028 presidential bid and to contest the ruling Marcos administration in the 2028 Philippine general election.

The coalition is nationally led by Davao City mayor Sebastian Duterte, the son of Rodrigo and the brother of Sara. The coalition is described as a "multi-sectoral" alliance of political groups, civic organizations, and grassroots movements that advocate for reform in government.

== History ==
Political parties under the RAGE Coalition
Political Party	Abbr.	Leader	Date joined	Citation
Partido Demokratiko Pilipino; Philippine Democratic Party	PDP	Sebastian Duterte	April 12, 2026	
Partido para sa Demokratikong Reporma; Party for Democratic Reform	Reporma	Pantaleon Alvarez	April 12, 2026	
Reform PH - People's Party; Reform Philippines - People's Party	RP	Mike Defensor	April 12, 2026	
Hugpong ng Pagbabago; Alliance of Change	HUP	Sara Duterte	May 25, 2026	

=== 2026 ===
The RAGE Coalition was formally launched on April 12, 2026, at the Club Filipino in San Juan, Metro Manila. The launch was led by Davao City mayor Sebastian Duterte a day after being appointed the party president of Partido Demokratiko Pilipino (PDP). The coalition includes three main parties, the PDP, the Partido para sa Demokratikong Reporma (Reporma), and the Reform PH Party (RP) and more than 600 other affiliated organizations. The launch had many notable political figures such as senators Bong Go and Robin Padilla, former executive secretary Vic Rodriguez, congressman and son of senator Rodante Marcoleta, Paolo Marcoleta, lawyer Ferdinand Topacio, lawyer and former press secretary Trixie Cruz-Angeles, former congressman Mike Defensor, congressman Leandro Leviste, lawyer Raul Lambino, lawyer Jimmy Bondoc, former house speaker Pantaleon Alvarez, several members of the Duterte cabinet and others. Senator Ronald dela Rosa gave an audio message to the coalition supporting it and reaffirming his support for vice president Sara Duterte, despite having a continued absence in the senate since November 11, 2025. Sebastian Duterte then criticized the Marcos administration due to the 2026 oil crisis, the handling of flood control projects scandal with Duterte calling it "self-destruction" for Marcos, corruption, and the rise of illegal drugs. Duterte also called Marcos a "gago" (stupid) and "bangag" (drug addict). Palace press undersecretary Claire Castro said a day later that Marcos is not affected by Duterte's statements.

On May 10, 2026, the RAGE Coalition was formally launched at the Casino Español de Cebu in Cebu City, the organizers at the event said that the coalition is composed of 111 groups scattered across the regions of the Visayas. Sebastian Duterte thanked former Cebu congressman Pablo John Garcia and current Cebu congresswoman Rachel del Mar for not signing the first impeachment complaints against Sara Duterte in 2025, he thanked them for "listening to their constituents than surrendering to political pressure".

On May 25, 2026, the party of Sara Duterte, Hugpong ng Pagbabago joined the coalition.

== Platform ==
The coalition is described as a "reform-oriented" unification of organizations, leaders, and citizens aiming to fighting corruption, advocating for good governance, and holding politicians accountable. According to Sebastian Duterte, the coalition will push for transparency and accountability across the government. The coalition's platform also includes advocating for policies that prioritize welfare, reducing economic inequality, and providing better access to basic services. It also supports the candidacy of vice president Sara Duterte for the 2028 Philippine presidential election.
