= Alan Balangi-Amer =

Filipino activist

- Citizenship: Filipino
- Occupation: Activist
- Movement: 1BANGSA

Maulana Balangi-Amer, more commonly known as Alan Balangi-Amer is a Maranao activist and diplomat who is the leader of One Bangsamoro Movement (1BANGSA). A native of Marawi, he mainly deals with Bangsamoro-related issues. He was an ambassador of the International Commission on Human Rights (ICHR) to the Association of South East Asian Nations (ASEAN). He has been convening of street parliamentarians in Metro Manila since 2015 while advocating for peace and justice of the Moros in the Philippines thru Bangsamoro Organic Law.

== Advocacy ==
Balangi-Amer joined into peace advocates since 2015, the same year the Comprehensive Agreement on the Bangsamoro (CAB) signed by President Rodrigo Duterte. He had led over 50 Moros to support the signing of the Bangsamoro Organic Law. He had rallied together with Muslims outside the Golden Mosque in Quiapo, Manila in 2018, months before January 21, 2019 plebiscite.

He had called Ronghiya government for equal protection of law for Burmese Muslims oppressed by Myanmar's extremist Buddhist groups and allow international communities to bring mass killings to the International Criminal Court (ICC).

Besides energy-producing body that provide 65% electrical power in Mindanao, he has called the creation of an office that supervise the development for Lake Lanao located in south of Marawi. He cited a Senate Bill discussed in 18th Congress in 2019.

During the 2017 Battle of Marawi, he along with members of his organization appealed to President Duterte to stop using airstrike and declare ceasefire to allow them and other group to rescue civilians.

Balangi-Amer during the COVID-19 pandemic calls government to establish a body that would serve as a council for Bangsamoro people outside Bangsamoro Autonomous Region in Muslim Mindanao.

He has urged scattered internally displaced persons from war-torn Marawi to go back home after enrolling to Executive Order No. 114 series of 2020, a program of Senator Bong Go due to discrimination faced by Moros residing in Metro Manila.
