= 1BANGSA =

Non-profit organization in the Philippines

- One Bangsamoro Movement, Inc.
- Region served: Bangsamoro
- Leader: Maulana "Alan" A. Balangi

One Bangsamoro Movement, Inc., also known as 1BANGSA, is a non-profit organization in the Philippines composed of multi-sectoral leaders and activists advocating for peace and unity among Filipinos as well as Bangsamoro people. It was led by Maulana "Alan" A. Balangi, a Maranao.

== History ==
The organization was a frontliner of peace advocacy during the signing of Comprehensive Agreement on the Bangsamoro (CAB). It was organized since August 8, 2008 three days before the propose of the Memorandum of Agreement on Ancestral Domain (MOA-AD) and the issuance of Temporary Restraining Order (TRO) to the Philippines.

They are the proponent of "One Million Signatures for Bangsamoro" held in Mendiola, Manila which collected one million supporters for the signing of Bangsamoro Basic Law (BBL) into law in 2015. They choose to be engaged into public affairs over violence extremism. Leaders of the group had gathered in Quezon City, Manila on January 11, 2019 to show their support for the ratification of Bangsamoro Organic Law (BOL), the revised version of BBL.

After BOL ratified in plebiscite on January 21, 2019 now known as Republic Act No. 11054, the organization on February 11, 2019 has urged President Rodrigo Duterte for "fair and equal" appointment of 80 members for the Bangsamoro Transition Authority, the interim members of parliament for the transition of Bangsamoro Autonomous Region in Muslim Mindanao (BARMM) from the Autonomous Region in Muslim Mindanao (ARMM).

== Coalition ==
Amidst the COVID-19 pandemic in the Philippines, the organization sent an open letter dated on April 8, 2020 to President Rodrigo Duterte seeking an extension of Enhanced Community Quarantine (ECQ) nationwide to stop the spread of the pandemic.

On February 3, 2019, the group joined a prayer rally by the National Commission on Muslim Filipinos (NCMF) prayer rally condemning the bombing of Jolo Cathedral in Sulu on January 27, 2019 that killed 22 people and the blast in a mosque in Zamboanga City.

On October 16, 2018, the movement with the leaders of Bangsamoro communities outside the Bangsamoro region assembled to assure support for the ratification of the Bangsamoro Organic Law.
