= Reina Mercedes, Isabela =

Municipality in Isabela, Philippines

Reina Mercedes
- Municipality
- Municipality of Reina Mercedes
- Flag Seal

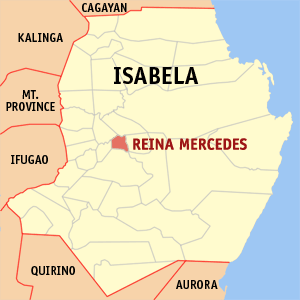
- Map of Isabela with Reina Mercedes highlighted
- Interactive map of Reina Mercedes
- Location within the Philippines
- Coordinates: 16°59′14″N 121°49′38″E
- Country: Philippines
- Region: Cagayan Valley
- Province: Isabela
- District: 2nd district
- Founded: January 20, 1886
- Named for: Mercedes of Orléans
- Barangays: 20 (see Barangays)

Government
  - Type: Sangguniang Bayan
  - Mayor: Maria Lourdes P. Respicio-Saguban
  - Vice Mayor: Jeryll Harold P. Respicio
  - Representative: Ed Christopher S. Go
  - Electorate: 17,780 voters (2025)

Area
  - Total: 57.14 km^{2} (22.06 sq mi)
- Elevation: 49 m (161 ft)
- Highest elevation: 88 m (289 ft)
- Lowest elevation: 32 m (105 ft)

Population (2024 census)
  - Total: 28,222
  - Density: 493.9/km^{2} (1,279/sq mi)
  - Households: 7,470

Economy
  - Income class: 1st municipal income class
  - Poverty incidence: 11.41% (2023)
  - Revenue: ₱ 330 million (2024)
  - Assets: ₱ 820.2 million (2024)
  - Expenditure: ₱ 205.9 million (2024)
  - Liabilities: ₱ 113.3 million (2024)

Service provider
  - Electricity: Isabela 1 Electric Cooperative (ISELCO 1)
- Time zone: UTC+8 (PST)
- ZIP code: 3303
- PSGC: 0203125000
- IDD : area code: +63 (0)78
- Native languages: Ilocano; Ibanag; Tagalog
- Website: www.reinamercedes.com.ph

Reina Mercedes, officially the Municipality of Reina Mercedes (Ilocano: Ili ti Reina Mercedes; Tagalog: Bayan ng Reina Mercedes), is a municipality in the province of Isabela, Philippines. According to the 2024 census, it has a population of 28,222 people.

== Etymology ==
The town derived its name in honor of Mercedes of Orléans, Queen of Spain. Coupled with the province's name "Isabela", named after Isabella II, Queen Regnant of Spain, the town's address of "Reina Mercedes, Isabela" is the most regnant address in the Philippines (which was also named after King Philip II of Spain).

== History ==
Reina Mercedes was founded in 1743 on the early Gaddang site of Abbag, which means "on the other side" (of the Magat River), before then being renamed to Calering, and Calanusian (from canusi, a species of white ebony). The town was finally renamed in honor of Queen Mercedes of Orléans, the first consort of Alfonso XII, son of Isabela II. Mercedes died of tuberculosis on June 26, 1878, in the fourth year of Alfonso's reign. When the town was partitioned from Cauayan on January 20, 1886, the priest Pedro Jiménez named it after the late queen.

== Geography ==
Reina Mercedes is 26 kilometres (16 mi) from the provincial capital Ilagan, and 416 kilometres (258 mi) from the country's capital Manila.

=== Barangays ===
Reina Mercedes is politically subdivided into 20 barangays. Each barangay consists of puroks while some have sitios.

- Banquero
- Binarsang
- Cutog Grande
- Cutog Pequeño
- Dangan
- District I (Poblacion)
- District II
- Labinab Grande
- Labinab Pequeño
- Mallalatang Grande
- Mallalatang Tunggui
- Nappacu Grande (Poblacion)
- Nappacu Pequeño (Poblacion)
- Salucong
- Santiago
- Santor
- Sinippil (Poblacion)
- Tallungan (Poblacion)
- Turod
- Villador

=== Climate ===
Climate data for Reina Mercedes, Isabela
| Month | Jan | Feb | Mar | Apr | May | Jun | Jul | Aug | Sep | Oct | Nov | Dec | Year |
|---|---|---|---|---|---|---|---|---|---|---|---|---|---|
| Mean daily maximum °C (°F) | 29 (84) | 30 (86) | 32 (90) | 35 (95) | 35 (95) | 35 (95) | 34 (93) | 33 (91) | 32 (90) | 31 (88) | 30 (86) | 28 (82) | 32 (90) |
| Mean daily minimum °C (°F) | 19 (66) | 20 (68) | 21 (70) | 23 (73) | 23 (73) | 24 (75) | 23 (73) | 23 (73) | 23 (73) | 22 (72) | 21 (70) | 20 (68) | 22 (71) |
| Average precipitation mm (inches) | 31.2 (1.23) | 23 (0.9) | 27.7 (1.09) | 28.1 (1.11) | 113.5 (4.47) | 141.4 (5.57) | 176.4 (6.94) | 236.6 (9.31) | 224.9 (8.85) | 247.7 (9.75) | 222.9 (8.78) | 178 (7.0) | 1,651.4 (65) |
| Average rainy days | 10 | 6 | 5 | 5 | 13 | 12 | 15 | 15 | 15 | 17 | 16 | 15 | 144 |
Source: World Weather Online

== Demographics ==
Population census of Reina Mercedes
| Year | Pop. | ±% p.a. |
|---|---|---|
| 1903 | 2,271 | — |
| 1918 | 3,600 | +3.12% |
| 1939 | 4,376 | +0.93% |
| 1948 | 5,029 | +1.56% |
| 1960 | 7,948 | +3.89% |
| 1970 | 10,899 | +3.20% |
| 1975 | 12,311 | +2.47% |
| 1980 | 14,388 | +3.17% |
| 1990 | 17,139 | +1.77% |
| 1995 | 17,816 | +0.73% |
| 2000 | 20,353 | +2.90% |
| 2007 | 21,874 | +1.00% |
| 2010 | 23,497 | +2.64% |
| 2015 | 26,998 | +2.68% |
| 2020 | 27,900 | +0.69% |
| 2024 | 28,222 | +0.28% |
Source: Philippine Statistics Authority

In the 2024 census, the population of Reina Mercedes was 28,222 people, with a density of 490 inhabitants per square kilometre or 1,300 inhabitants per square mile.

== Economy ==
Poverty incidence of Reina Mercedes (%)

Source: Philippine Statistics Authority

== Government ==
=== Local government ===
As a municipality in the Province of Isabela, government officials at the provincial and municipal levels are voted by the town. The provincial government has political jurisdiction over most local transactions of the municipal government.

The Municipality of Reina Mercedes is governed by a mayor, designated as its Local Chief Executive, and by a municipal council as its legislative body in accordance with the Local Government Code. The mayor, vice mayor, and the municipal councilors are elected directly in elections held every three years.

Barangays are also headed by elected officials: Barangay Captain, Barangay Council, whose members are called Barangay Councilors. The barangays have SK federation which represents the barangay, headed by SK chairperson and whose members are called SK councilors. All officials are also elected every three years.

=== Elected officials ===
2025-2028 Reina Mercedes, Isabela Officials
| Position | Name | Party |
|---|---|---|
| Mayor | Maria Lourdes P. Respicio-Saguban | Lakas |
| Vice Mayor | Jeryll Harold P. Respicio | Independent |
| Councilors | Paolo R. Addun | Lakas |
| Councilors | Arnol M. Barangan | Lakas |
| Councilors | Hilaria M. Cutaran | PFP |
| Councilors | Edwin M. Esteban | Lakas |
| Councilors | Albino B. Cuntapay | Lakas |
| Councilors | Domingo P. Baua Jr. | Lakas |
| Councilors | Salvador B. Apostol | Lakas |
| Councilors | Heribert R. Galabay | Independent |
Ex Officio Municipal Council Members
| ABC President | TBD | Nonpartisan |
| SK Federation President | TBD | Nonpartisan |

=== Congress representation ===
Reina Mercedes, belonging to the second legislative district of the province of Isabela, currently represented by Hon. Ed Christopher S. Go.

== Education ==
The Schools Division of Isabela governs the town's public education system. The division office is a field office of the DepEd in Cagayan Valley region. Reina Mercedes Schools District office governs the public elementary and high schools throughout the municipality.

=== Elementary schools ===
- Binarsang Elementary School
- Bliss Elementary School
- Cutog Grande Elementary School
- Cutog Pequeño Elementary School
- Dangan Elementary School
- Mallalatang Elementary School
- Nappacu Grande-Sinippil Elementary School
- Nappacu Pequeño Elementary School
- Reina Mercedes Central School (District 2)
- Salucong Elementary School
- Santiago Elementary School
- Santor Elementary School
- Tallungan Elementary School

=== Secondary schools ===
- Banquero Integrated School
- Reina Mercedes National Highschool (Cutog Pequeno)
- Reina Mercedes Vocational and Industrial School (Pan-Philippine Highway)
- Turod Integrated School
