= Harold Respicio =

Filipino accountant, lawyer and politician (born 1988)

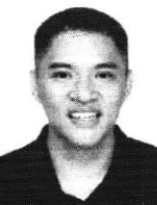
- Respicio certificate of candidacy photo in 2024

Vice Mayor of Reina Mercedes, Isabela
- Incumbent
- Assumed office June 30, 2025
- Mayor: Malou Respicio-Saguban
- Preceded by: Bong Respicio

Personal details
- Born: Jeryll Harold Paz Respicio; March 30, 1988 (age 38) Quezon City, Philippines
- Party: PDP (since 2026)
- Other political affiliations: Independent (2021–2026)
- Education: De La Salle University (BS); Ateneo de Manila University (JD)
- Occupation: Politician, lawyer, accountant
- Website: https://www.respicio.ph/

Jeryll Harold Paz Respicio (born March 30, 1988) is a Filipino certified public accountant, lawyer and politician who has served as Vice Mayor of Reina Mercedes, Isabela since 2025.

== Early life and education ==
Respicio was born on March 30, 1988, in Quezon City. He studied Bachelor of Science in Accountancy at the De La Salle University. In 2008, he passed the certified public accountant licensure examination. He also studied Juris Doctor at the Ateneo de Manila University. In 2016, he passed the bar examination.

== Political career ==
=== 2022 House of Representatives bid ===
In 2022 elections, Respicio ran for representative of the 2nd district of Isabela but he lost to Ed Christopher Go.

=== Vice Mayor of Reina Mercedes (2025–present) ===
In 2025 elections, Respicio was elected as vice mayor of Reina Mercedes, Isabela. Following his victory, his proclamation was briefly suspended from May 12 to June 3, 2026, by the Commission on Elections (Comelec). The suspension stemmed from cyberlibel and cybercrime charges filed against him after he alleged on Facebook that he could tamper automated counting machines. Respicio assumed office on June 30, 2025. Being a staunch supporter of the Duterte family, he joined the PDP–Laban party in 2026.

In May 2026, the Cybercrime Investigation and Coordinating Center (CICC) sued Respicio before the National Bureau of Investigation (NBI) for inciting to sedition and rebellion over a statement where he allegedly asked his audience to revolt if the Constitution fails. Respicio defended his remarks as protected rhetorical speech meant to expose corruption and denied that they posed any clear and present danger.

On October 5, 2026, Respicio was involved in a viral confrontation with barangay officials during a Reina Mercedes Municipal Council session, where he repeatedly accused them of being thieves over a ₱66 million tobacco excise tax allocation. The incident required police intervention and prompted Interior and Local Government Secretary Jonvic Remulla to publicly call on Respicio to undergo a drug test. Respicio complied with the drug test and successfully requested a reimbursement from Remulla.

== Electoral history ==
Electoral history of Harold Respicio
Year	Office	Party	Votes received				Result
Year	Office	Party	Total	%	P.	Swing	Result
2022	Representative (Isabela–2nd)	Independent	12,711	13.42%	2nd	—N/a	Lost
2025	Vice Mayor of Reina Mercedes	Independent	6,042	33.98%	1st	—N/a	Won
