= Joseph Lara (politician) =

Filipino politician

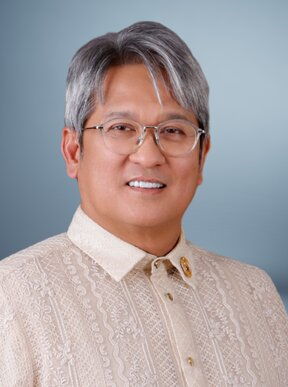
- Official portrait, 2025

Member of the House of Representatives of the Philippines for Cagayan's 3rd congressional district
- Incumbent
- Assumed office June 30, 2019
- Preceded by: Randolph Ting

Personal details
- Born: Joseph Lasam Lara; July 19, 1966 (age 60) Tuguegarao, Philippines
- Party: Lakas (2024–present)
- Other political affiliations: PDP (2018–2024); NPC (2009–2018)
- Occupation: Politician

Joseph "Jojo Pulsar" Lasam Lara (born 1966) is a Filipino politician who served in the House of Representatives of the Philippines for three terms. Born in Tuguegarao, he ran for mayor in his birthplace in the 2010 elections but failed to secure a win. He subsequently ran in the 2019 elections under Partido Demokratiko Pilipino for Cagayan's 3rd congressional district and won. He produced numerous infrastructure projects in Cagayan. He was re-elected in the 2022 elections under the same party and succeeded. Shortly after, he conducted an investigation against Cagayan Governor Manuel Mamba. He also filed a House resolution pertaining to Chinese students in Filipino schools. He ran for re-election in the 2025 elections under Lakas–CMD and prevailed. He is currently the chairperson of the House Committee of Disaster Resilience.

== Early life and career ==
Joseph "Jojo Pulsar" Lasam Lara was born on July 19, 1966, in Tuguegarao. In the 2010 Philippine general election, Lara ran for mayor of Tuguegarao against Delfin Ting. Ting won with 32,850 votes, with Lara gaining 24,944 votes.

== House of Representatives (2019–2025) ==
=== First term (2019–2022) ===
Lara positioned himself as a contender in the 2019 Philippine general election under Partido Demokratiko Pilipino; his opponent was part of the National Unity Party. He won with 118,674 votes while his opponent gained 74,248 votes. One of his first bills in Congress during the 18th Congress of the Philippines aimed to upgrade the Cagayan Valley Medical Center from a 500-bed capacity to 1,000. The bill was approved by the Senate and was additionally sponsored by Senator Bong Go. The Philippine Information Agency (PIA) declared 2021 as a "building year" in Cagayan, particularly in the third district, due to progress made in projects by Lara. Project development slowed during the COVID-19 pandemic. He launched a scholarship program that provided 4,000 PHP per student. As of 2023, 5,000 scholars benefited from the program according to the PIA.

=== Second term (2022–2025) ===
In the filing of certificates of candidacies for the 2022 Philippine general election, Lara ran for House Representative in the third legislative district of Cagayan alongside his wife, who ran for governor against Manuel Mamba. In the election, Lara ran under Partido Demokratiko Pilipino. He had two opponents: Mabel Mamba with the Nacionalista Party and an independent one. He won with 147,669 votes, a percentage of 65.17, defeating the other two contestants. His wife lost. Shortly after, he led an investigation on Mamba's alleged disbursements during his campaign. The investigation caused the Cagayan provincial information head to be detained for 30 days for ignoring summons without any legal excuse. Mamba was absent in the hearing, causing the Philippine House Committees on Public Accounts and Suffrage and Electoral Reforms to issue a detention order for Mamba on August 17. Mamba was eventually fined 30,000 PHP after the probe. On March 20, 2024, Lara filed a house resolution pertaining to the influx of allegedly Chinese students enrolling in Filipino schools. He stated that the influx was "suspicious," citing rising tensions related to the South China Sea controversy. In response, school officials denied the allegations in a statement to Rappler.

=== Third term (2025–present) ===
During the filing of certificates of candidacies for the 2025 Philippine general election, Lara ran for re-election as representative. He ran under Lakas–CMD and had one opponent running under the National Unity Party. He won with 144,276 votes. Lara has numerous committee memberships in the 20th Congress; his most prominent role is as the chairperson of the House Committee of Disaster Resilience. He has roles as the vice chairperson of four other committees, namely the Committee on Dangerous Drugs, the Committee on Foreign Affairs, the Committee on Human Rights, and the Committee on Public Information. He also holds a vice chairperson role in one special House Committee: the Committee on the North Luzon Growth Quadrangle.
