= Isabela's 2nd congressional district =

Legislative district of the Philippines

- Constituency for the House of Representatives of the Philippines
- Boundary of Isabela's 2nd congressional district in Isabela

- Location of Isabela within the Philippines
- Province: Isabela
- Region: Cagayan Valley
- Population: 199,903 (2020)
- Electorate: 127,579 (2025)
- Major settlements: 6 LGUs: Municipalities; Benito Soliven; Gamu; Naguilian; Palanan; Reina Mercedes; San Mariano
- Area: 2,890.49 km^{2} (1,116.02 sq mi)

Current constituency
- Created: 1987
- Representative: Ed Christopher S. Go
- Political party: PFP
- Congressional bloc: Majority

Isabela's 2nd congressional district is one of the six congressional districts of the Philippines in the province of Isabela. It has been represented in the House of Representatives since 1987. The district consists of the east-central municipalities of Benito Soliven, Gamu, Naguilian, Palanan, Reina Mercedes and San Mariano. It also consisted of the western municipalities of Aurora, Burgos, Mallig, Quezon, Quirino, Roxas, and San Manuel until the 2019 redistricting that incorporated Palanan and Reina Mercedes into the district. It is currently represented in the 20th Congress by Ed Christopher S. Go of the Partido Federal ng Pilipinas (PFP).

== Representation history ==
#	Image	Member	Term of office		Congress	Party	Electoral history	Constituent LGUs
#	Image	Member	Start	End	Congress	Party	Electoral history	Constituent LGUs
=== Isabela's 2nd district for the House of Representatives of the Philippines ===
District created February 2, 1987 from Isabela's at-large district.
1		Simplicio B. Domingo Jr.	June 30, 1987	June 30, 1992	8th	KBL	Elected in 1987.	1987–2019; Aurora, Benito Soliven, Burgos, Gamu, Mallig, Naguilian, Quezon, Quirino, Roxas, San Manuel, San Mariano
2		Faustino S. Dy Jr.	June 30, 1992	June 30, 2001	9th	NPC	Elected in 1992.	1987–2019; Aurora, Benito Soliven, Burgos, Gamu, Mallig, Naguilian, Quezon, Quirino, Roxas, San Manuel, San Mariano
2		Faustino S. Dy Jr.	June 30, 1992	June 30, 2001	10th	NPC	Re-elected in 1995.	1987–2019; Aurora, Benito Soliven, Burgos, Gamu, Mallig, Naguilian, Quezon, Quirino, Roxas, San Manuel, San Mariano
2		Faustino S. Dy Jr.	June 30, 1992	June 30, 2001	11th	LAMMP	Re-elected in 1998.	1987–2019; Aurora, Benito Soliven, Burgos, Gamu, Mallig, Naguilian, Quezon, Quirino, Roxas, San Manuel, San Mariano
3		Edwin C. Uy	June 30, 2001	June 30, 2010	12th	Lakas	Elected in 2001.	1987–2019; Aurora, Benito Soliven, Burgos, Gamu, Mallig, Naguilian, Quezon, Quirino, Roxas, San Manuel, San Mariano
3		Edwin C. Uy	June 30, 2001	June 30, 2010	13th	Lakas	Re-elected in 2004.	1987–2019; Aurora, Benito Soliven, Burgos, Gamu, Mallig, Naguilian, Quezon, Quirino, Roxas, San Manuel, San Mariano
3		Edwin C. Uy	June 30, 2001	June 30, 2010	14th	Liberal	Re-elected in 2007.	1987–2019; Aurora, Benito Soliven, Burgos, Gamu, Mallig, Naguilian, Quezon, Quirino, Roxas, San Manuel, San Mariano
4		Ana Cristina S. Go	June 30, 2010	June 30, 2019	15th	Nacionalista	Elected in 2010.	1987–2019; Aurora, Benito Soliven, Burgos, Gamu, Mallig, Naguilian, Quezon, Quirino, Roxas, San Manuel, San Mariano
4		Ana Cristina S. Go	June 30, 2010	June 30, 2019	16th	Nacionalista	Re-elected in 2013.	1987–2019; Aurora, Benito Soliven, Burgos, Gamu, Mallig, Naguilian, Quezon, Quirino, Roxas, San Manuel, San Mariano
4		Ana Cristina S. Go	June 30, 2010	June 30, 2019	17th	Nacionalista	Re-elected in 2016.	1987–2019; Aurora, Benito Soliven, Burgos, Gamu, Mallig, Naguilian, Quezon, Quirino, Roxas, San Manuel, San Mariano
5		Ed Christopher S. Go	June 30, 2019	Incumbent	18th	Nacionalista	Elected in 2019.	2019–present Benito Soliven, Gamu, Naguilian, Palanan, Reina Mercedes, San Mariano
5		Ed Christopher S. Go	June 30, 2019	Incumbent	19th	Lakas	Re-elected in 2022.	2019–present Benito Soliven, Gamu, Naguilian, Palanan, Reina Mercedes, San Mariano
5		Ed Christopher S. Go	June 30, 2019	Incumbent	20th	PFP	Re-elected in 2025.	2019–present Benito Soliven, Gamu, Naguilian, Palanan, Reina Mercedes, San Mariano

== Election results ==
=== 2025 ===
Candidate	Party	Votes	%
Ed Christopher Go (incumbent)	Lakas–CMD	90,186	100.00
Total		90,186	100.00
Valid votes		90,186	83.33
Invalid/blank votes		18,044	16.67
Total votes		108,230	100.00
Registered voters/turnout		127,579	84.83
Lakas–CMD hold			
Source: Commission on Elections

=== 2022 ===
2022 Philippine House of Representatives election in Isabela's 2nd District
Party	Candidate	Votes	%
Nacionalista	Ed Christopher Go	80,841	85.35%
Independent	Jeryll Harold Respicio	12,711	13.42%
KBL	Faustino Reyes	588	062%
PGRP	Elizabeth Magora	581	0.61%
Total votes		94,721	100.00%

== See also ==
- Legislative districts of Isabela
