= Ed Christopher Go =

Filipino politician (born 1989)

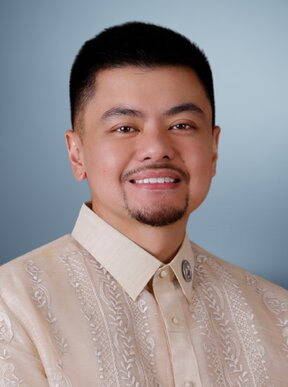
- Official portrait, 2025

Member of the Philippine House of Representatives from Isabela's 2nd district
- Incumbent
- Assumed office 30 June 2019
- Preceded by: Ana Cristina S. Go

Member of the Isabela Provincial Board from the 2nd district
- In office June 30, 2016 – June 30, 2019

Personal details
- Born: 30 June 1989 (age 37) Quezon City, Philippines
- Party: PFP (2026–present)
- Other political affiliations: Lakas (2024–2026); Nacionalista (2018–2024); Liberal (2015–2018)
- Occupation: Politician

Ed Cristopher Siquian Go (born 30 June 1989) is a Filipino politician currently serving as a member of the Philippine House of Representatives representing the 2nd District of Isabela since 2019. He is a member of the Partido Federal ng Pilipinas.

== Political career ==
Go is a member of a political family in Isabela, with his father being a longtime mayor of San Mariano, Isabela, her mother a former House representative herself, and his brother a member of the Isabela Provincial Board in 2024. Go was elected congressman in 2022 under the Nacionalista Party. Go joined Lakas in 2024.

== Controversies ==
In 2018, while serving on the Isabela board, Go was involved in a traffic collision on Tomas Morato Avenue in Quezon City that resulted in the death of a parking attendant. Police reported that Go, who had identified himself as a government official, showed signs of intoxication. He faced charges of reckless imprudence resulting in homicide and driving under the influence of liquor.

== Electoral history ==
Electoral history of Ed Christopher Go
Year	Office	Party	Votes received				Result
Year	Office	Party	Total	%	P.	Swing	Result
2016	Board Member (Isabela–2nd)	Liberal	76,415	—N/a	2nd	—N/a	Won
2019	Representative (Isabela–2nd)	Nacionalista	58,685	—N/a	1st	—N/a	Won
2022	Representative (Isabela–2nd)	Nacionalista	80,841	85.35%	1st	—N/a	Won
2025	Representative (Isabela–2nd)	Lakas	90,186	100.00%	1st	—N/a	Unopposed
