= Pederalismo ng Dugong Dakilang Samahan =

Philippine political party supporting Rodrigo Duterte

- President: Greco Belgica
- Chairman: Eduardo Bringas
- Secretary-General: Baldr Bringas
- Founder: Greco Belgica
- Founded: October 30, 2018
- Ideology: Federalism; Populism; Dutertismo
- National affiliation: DuterTen (2024–present)
- Senate: 0 / 24
- House of Representatives: 0 / 317
- Provincial governors: 0 / 82

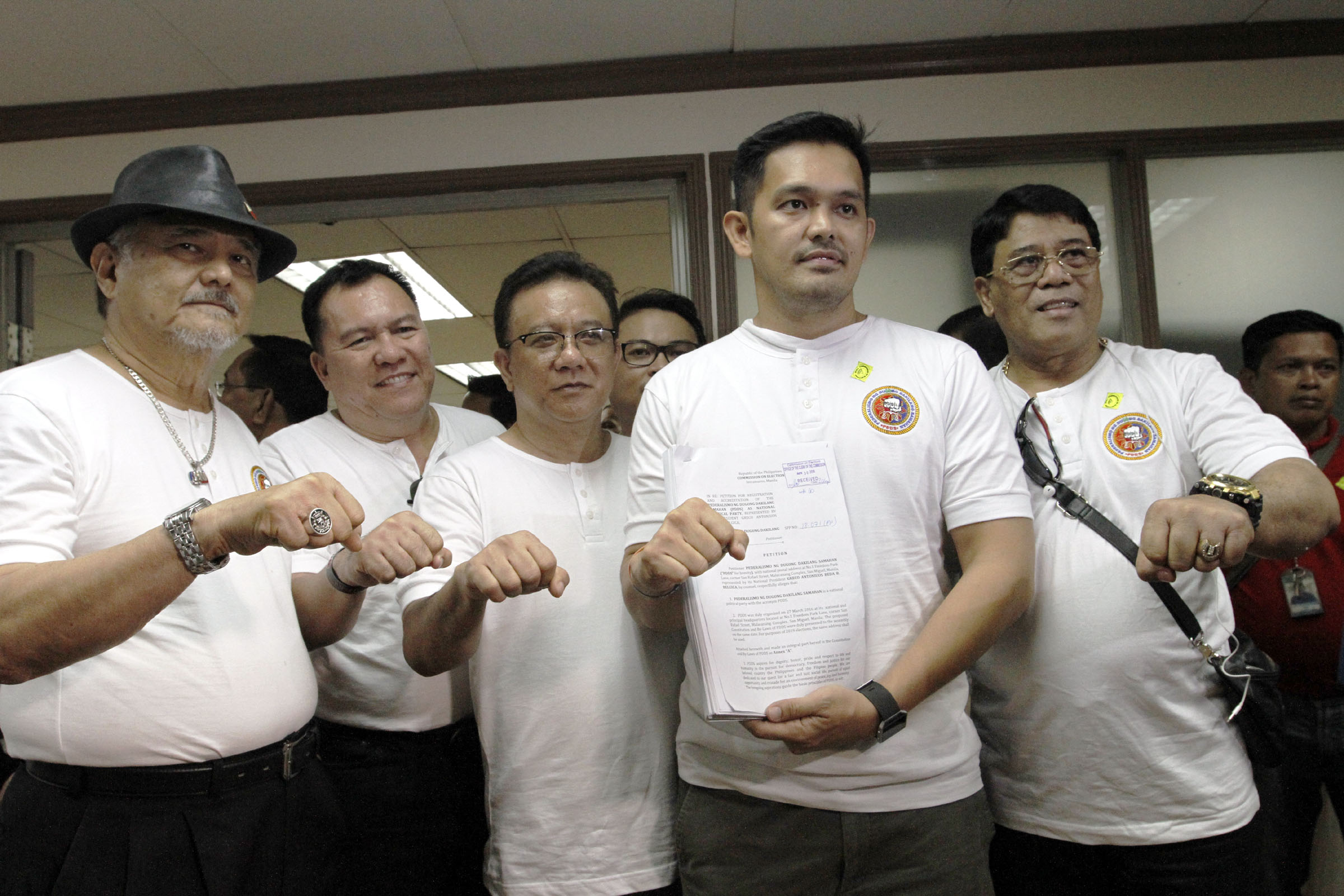
Greco Belgica (second from right), along with other PDDS officers, when they sought accreditation to run in the 2019 elections.

Pederalismo ng Dugong Dakilang Samahan (transl. Federalism of the Noble Blooded Association; abbreviated as PDDS) is a Dutertist national political party in the Philippines accredited by the Commission on Elections (COMELEC) on October 30, 2018. It was founded by Presidential Anti-Corruption (PACC) Chairman Greco Belgica. He says that the members are the original followers of Philippine president Rodrigo Duterte in the 2016 presidential election. The main thrust of the party is for federalism to be applied to the Philippines.

The party sought accreditation from the Commission on Elections so that it can run candidates for the 2019 midterm election.

The group was a registered party-list organization for the 2019 and 2022 elections. However they sought seats in the House of Representatives through partylist representation in those election. This led to the cancellation of their accreditation as a partylist for the upcoming 2025 election.

On September 20, 2024, Partido Demokratiko Pilipino formally formed an alliance for the 2025 elections with Partido para sa Demokratikong Reporma, Pederalismo ng Dugong Dakilang Samahan and the Mayor Rodrigo Roa Duterte-National Executive Coordinating Committee (MRRD-NECC). Greco Belgica and Pantaleon Alvarez signed the agreement.

== 2022 elections ==
Candidates for the national elections
Position	Name	substituted for	Status
President	Senator Christopher Lawrence "Bong" T. Go	Grepor "Butch" Belgica	Withdrew
Vice President	Benedicto "Joe" M. Jose		Withdrew
Senator	President Rodrigo Duterte	Mona-Liza O. Visorde	Withdrew
Senator	Greco B. Belgica		Official candidate
Senator	Nur-Ana I. Sahidulla		Official candidate

== 2019 elections ==
PDDS supported the candidacy of former Special Assistant to the President Bong Go, who won as Senator in the 2019 Senatorial Elections.

Eduardo Gadiano, their gubernatorial candidate in Occidental Mindoro is their highest ranking elected official.

The municipality of Omar, Sulu, has the most number of PDDS winning candidates consisting of its municipal mayor, vice mayor and the whole Municipal Council.

== Electoral performance ==
=== President ===
Election	Candidate	Number of votes	Share of votes	Outcome of election
2022	None	None	None	Bongbong Marcos (PFP)

=== Vice president ===
Election	Candidate	Number of votes	Share of votes	Outcome of election
2022	None	None	None	Sara Duterte (Lakas)

=== Senate ===
Election	Number of votes	Share of votes	Seats won	Seats after	Outcome of election
2022	2,961,164	0.05%	0 / 12	0 / 24	No seats

=== House of Representatives ===
Election	Number of votes	Share of votes	Seats	Outcome of election
2019	259,423	0.64%	0 / 304	No seats
2022	426,251	0.89%	1 / 316	Joined the majority bloc
