= Dutertismo =

Filipino syncretic political ideology

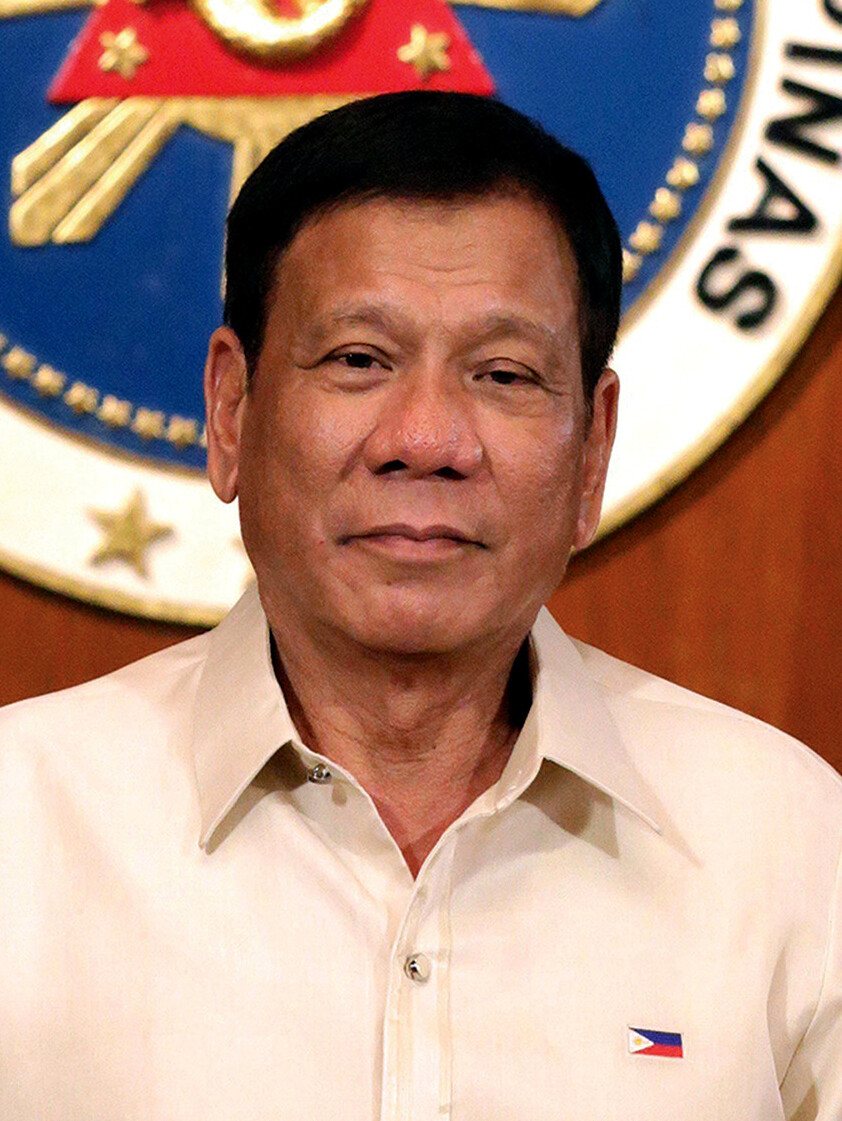
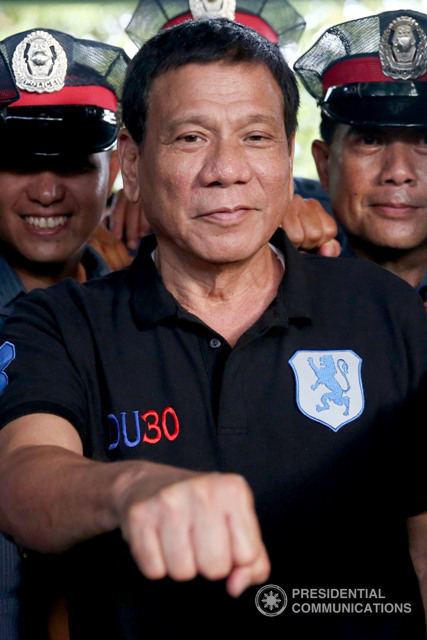
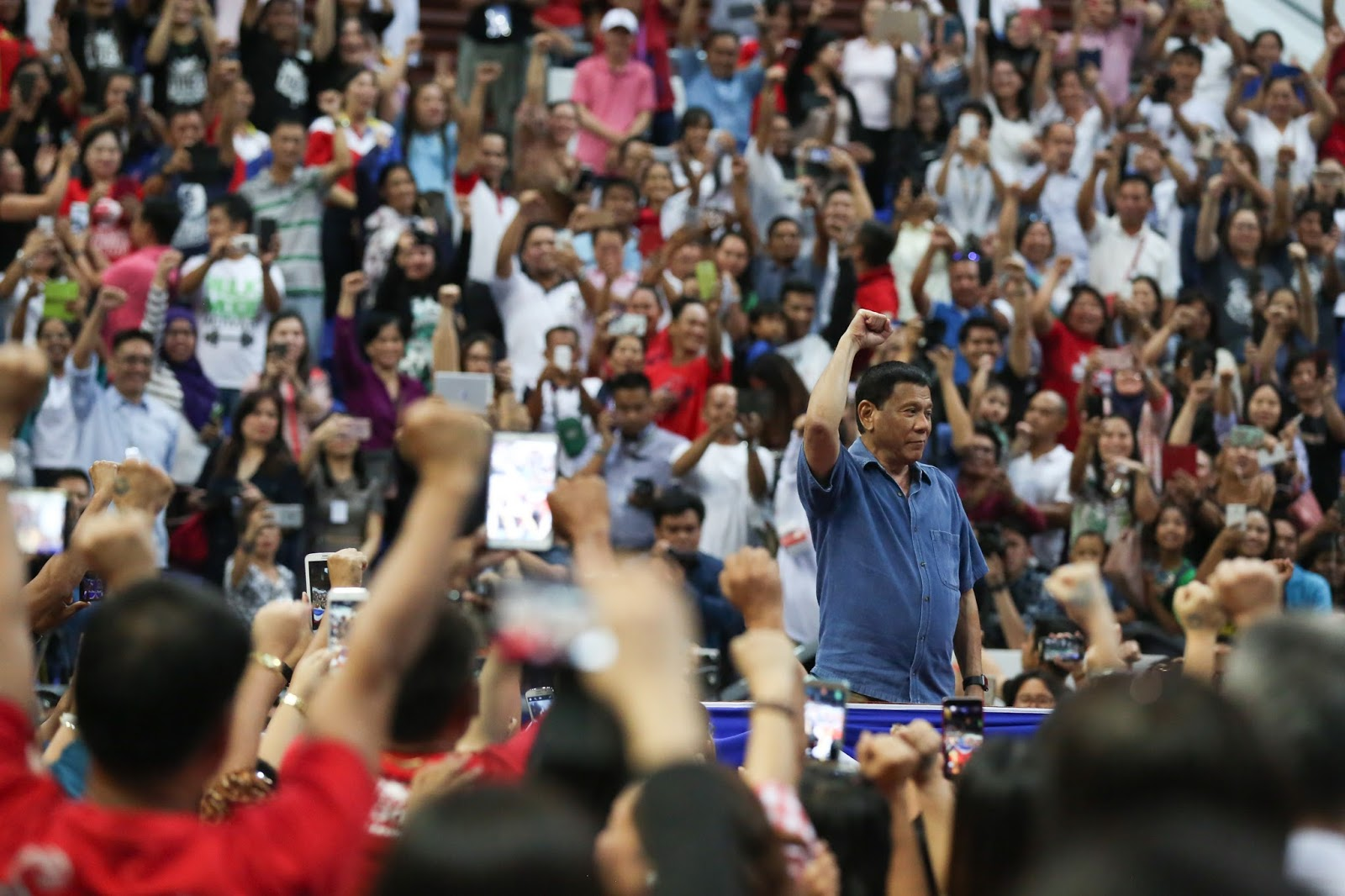
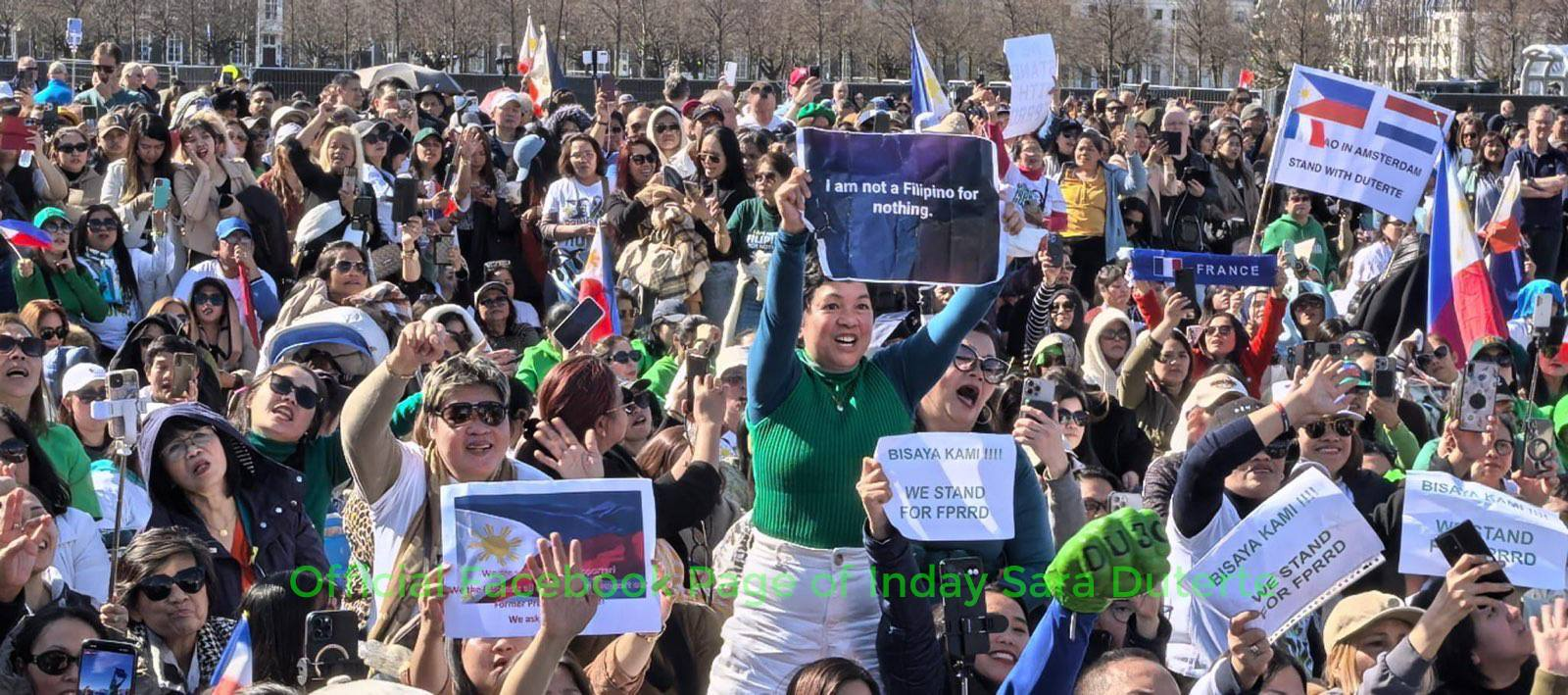
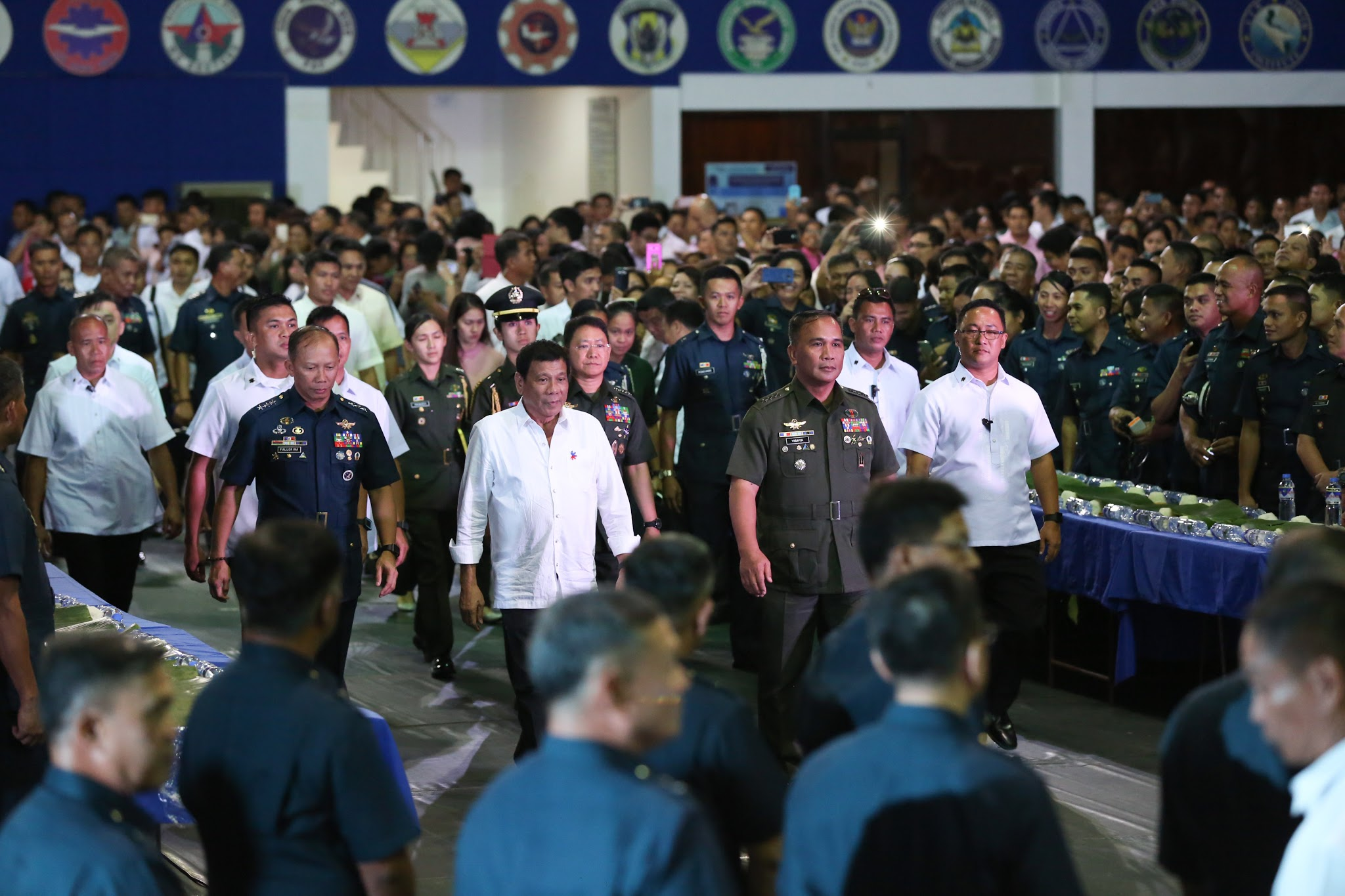
- From left to right, top to bottom: Rodrigo Duterte's official portrait in 2016; Sara Duterte's official portrait in 2022; Rodrigo Duterte doing the Duterte fist; Rodrigo Duterte in Brunei meeting the Filipino community.; A protest against the arrest of Rodrigo Duterte in The Hague; Rodrigo Duterte and his soldiers go to the Philippine Air Force multi-purpose gymnasium
- Leader: Rodrigo Duterte; Sara Duterte
- Founder: Rodrigo Duterte
- Founded: November 27, 2015; 10 years ago
- Ideology: Federalism (Dutertist); Neo-nationalism; Anti-communism; Anti-intellectualism; Illiberalism; Sinophilia; Authoritarianism; Penal populism Factions: Anti-Aquinoism; Historical: Social democracy Economic populism
- Political position: Syncretic to right-wing Historical: Centre-left
- Country: Philippines
- National affiliation: PDP–Laban

Dutertismo (Tagalog pronunciation: [duteɾˈtismo]), also known in English as Dutertism or Duterteism, is a syncretic political ideology of Rodrigo Duterte, the 16th president of the Philippines and his family. His political base, who are often referred to as "Diehard Duterte Supporters" or "DDS", has been compared to a cult of personality.

Dutertismo mixes ideologies and beliefs such as penal populism, authoritarianism, illiberalism, anti-intellectualism, anti-communism, neo-nationalism, Dutertist federalism, militarism, and state violence. Duterte branded himself as left-leaning during his presidential campaign, and Partido Demokratiko Pilipino, Duterte's political party, has synthesized left-wing populist rhetoric with right-wing populist policies. Duterte supported the Communist Party of the Philippines until he backtracked later on, but continues to support the Chinese Communist Party, despite allegedly having an anti-communism policy inside the Philippines. Dutertismo also rejects or sidelines the victory of the Philippines in the South China Sea Arbitration. Duterte also supports the specific administration of Benjamin Netanyahu in Israel.

== Dutertist policies ==
=== Pro-China positioning ===
A key part of Dutertismo is the relationship between adherents like Duterte with China, administered by the Chinese Communist Party. The ideology deeply pursues a highly pro-China foreign policy. The Duterte family has a deep history with communist China. During the administration of Rodrigo Duterte, he personally met and spoke through other connections numerous Chinese officials including Chinese president Xi Jinping and other high-ranking members of the Chinese communist party. Duterte himself called the South China Sea Arbitration victory of the Philippines against China as a 'piece of paper' he will throw as trash.

Under his watch, the National Grid Corporation of the Philippines (NGCP) allowed Chinese nationals to “exercise leadership and management roles”, awarded 43 contracts to Chinese firms, and made it 40-percent owned by the State Grid Corporation of China. It was also under his watch that Chinese espionage work intensified in the Philippines beginning in 2016. Duterte also legalized and expanded Chinese-controlled Philippine offshore gaming operators (POGOs), which is connected to fake Filipino citizenships for Chinese citizens like Alice Guo.

While Duterte's daughter, vice president Sara Duterte who is also known for her pro-China statements, has been implicated for receiving through her linked corporation P319 million in remittances from China and another P150 million siphoned as “donation” by the Chinese government to Duterte's Malasakit Foundation as confirmed by the Anti–Money Laundering Council (AMLC). The corporation involved has also been confirmed as linked to the Embassy of China.

=== Pro-Netanyahu Israel positioning ===
The Duterte family has heavily been in favor of the specific administration of prime minister Benjamin Netanyahu in Israel, especially during the Israeli–Palestinian conflict.

The Dutertes have personally met with Israeli prime minister Benjamin Netanyahu during high-ranking state meetings. Both Rodrigo Duterte and his daughter Sara Duterte shook hands with Netanyahu as a sign of support amid the Gaza genocide. Rodrigo Duterte is also known for falsely claiming that his children from his ex-wife were Jewish by blood due to their Zimmerman roots. Genealogists and historians have confirmed that the Zimmermans are not Jewish.

In 2023, Rodrigo Duterte adviced Israeli prime minister Benjamin Netanyahu to eliminate Palestinians and "make Gaza the world's biggest cemetery." while Sara Duterte showed full support to Israel by visiting the Embassy of Israel in the Philippines, conveying her allyship with Israeli ambassador Ilan Fluss. The Duterte family members, including Sebastian 'Baste' Duterte have personally met with Israel's ambassadors and officials multiples times across their political careers.

=== War on drugs and crime ===
The Philippine drug war or locally known as the "War on Drugs" is a key Dutertist policy that began in 2016, the idea or the local versions of it originated from when Rodrigo Duterte was Mayor in Davao City and popularized when it became a campaign promise. It is a policy that "eradicates crime" by killing criminals such as drug addicts, drug lords, and other criminals, even urging his supporters to kill drug addicts themselves. In reality, many of those killed by the drug war were civilian women and children, many of which were not involved in drugs at all. While those that were involved were small-time addicts, while not a single major drug lord was captured. This is the most controversial Dutertist policy with official tallies saying 6,252 died from 2016 to 2022, however, an investigation from the International Criminal Court estimated that 12,000 to 30,000 people were killed from July 2016 to March 2019. While Duterte established an anti-drug image, it was later revealed that his own children such as Sebastian Duterte and Kitty Duterte have been using illegal drugs with photo evidences. Additionally, the Anti–Money Laundering Council (AMLC) has confirmed that Chinese drug lord Sammy Uy, who was appointed by Duterte as his economic adviser, gave a minimum of P181.6 million in payments via cashier’s and personal checks to various members of the Duterte family from 2011 to 2013 alone. In 2025, Duterte was arrested by the ICC and charged with crimes against humanity due to the war on drugs, which has since been branded as a fake drug war made only to cover-up the drug connections of the Duterte family.

=== Capital punishment ===
During Rodrigo Duterte 2016 presidential campaign, he advocated and promised the restoration of the death penalty by public hanging. It is a common Dutertist policy many supporters are in favor for, it would restore it as the solution to end crimes like drugs, rape, and kidnapping and the execution of criminals. However, since 2006, the death penalty was abolished in the Philippines. Bills have been filed for the restoration of this but none have passed, with the latest one being in January 2025, Congressman then Zamboanga City mayor Khymer Adan Olaso, a Duterte ally filing a bill to have corrupt officials get sentenced to firing squad., which was unsuccessful. During the Mary Jane Veloso drug smuggling case, where Filipino victim Mary Jane Veloso was imprisoned by Indonesia, Duterte told the Indonesian government to kill Veloso, despite Veloso being a victim of human trafficking.

=== Militarism ===
During Rodrigo Duterte's presidency, Duterte admitted of militarization of government after appointing retired military officers to posts that are unrelated to national security. Duterte also asked the military to "take over" the Bureau of Customs. He defended former military and police personnel, saying they are less likely to "debate" with him.

== Symbols ==
=== Duterte fist ===
The Duterte fist also known as the "Duterte pose" is a hand gesture made by Rodrigo Duterte, his allies, and his supporters before and during his presidency, its made by raising a clenched fist at chest or eye level. The gesture is regarded as a signature symbol of Duterte and Dutertismo. However critics say the gesture is a symbol of the Philippine drug war and right wing populism in the Philippines. The gesture is also used in the logo of the PDP.

=== Color green ===
The color Green was first used as the official campaign color for Rodrigo Duterte's 2016 presidential campaign and was popularized by Sara Duterte during the 2022 Philippine vice presidential election during her campaign to run for vice president under UniTeam. The color is widely used as the official color of Dutertismo and Duterte allies. On Rodrigo Duterte's 80th birthday during his detainment in The Hague, supporters painted Davao City in green.

== Allied parties and organizations ==
=== Political parties ===
- PDP–Laban (the main political party of Rodrigo Duterte and Dutertismo since 2015)
- Pederalismo ng Dugong Dakilang Samahan (PDDS; a political party supporting Rodrigo Duterte)
- Partido Pilipino sa Pagbabago (PPP; a nationalist political party based in Mindanao that supports Sara Duterte)
- Partido para sa Demokratikong Reporma (Partido Reporma; a political party that supports Sara Duterte)
- Hugpong sa Tawong Lungsod (HTL; the local party of the Dutertes in Davao City)
- Hugpong ng Pagbabago (HNP or Hugpong; an electoral alliance formed by Sara Duterte in favor of Rodrigo Duterte's administration, which later became a local party and the political party of Sara Duterte as vice president)
- Katipunan ng Demokratikong Pilipino (KDP; a far-right and neo-nationalist political party formed by supporters of Rodrigo Duterte)
- Reform PH Party (Reform PH; a political party that supports Sara Duterte)
- Nacionalista Party (NP; a political party that supports Sara Duterte)

=== Political organizations ===
- RAGE Coalition (2028 electoral alliance supporting Sara Duterte's presidential bid)
- DuterTen (2025 electoral alliance opposing Bongbong Marcos's administration and supporting Sara Duterte)
- Duterte Youth (defunct right-wing party-list organization that advocated youth support for Rodrigo Duterte and was delisted in 2025)
- Hakbang ng Maisug (organization supporting Rodrigo and Sara Duterte)
- Labor Power Movement (pro-Duterte labor group)
- Epanaw Sambayanan (anti-communist party-list and mass organization of former CPP-NPA-NDF members)
- Liga Independencia Pilipinas (nationalist and anti-communist group)
- Puwersa ng Pilipinong Pandagat (party-list organization representing the interests of fisherfolk)
- Citizen National Guard (defunct right-wing, neo-nationalist advocacy group formed by supporters of Rodrigo Duterte that merged into KDP)
- Coalition for Change (multi-party coalition formed by supporters of the administration of Rodrigo Duterte)

== See also ==
- Political positions of Rodrigo Duterte
- Presidency of Rodrigo Duterte
- Philippine drug war
- Diehard Duterte Supporters
- Duterte family

=== Similar ideologies ===
- Bibism
- Bolsonarism
- Cartismo
- Chavismo
- Erdoğanism
- Fujimorism
- Orbanism
- Peronism
- Pinochetism
- Putinism
- Trumpism
