= Citizen National Guard =

Filipino nationalist advocacy group

The Citizen National Guard (CNG) was a Filipino nationalist and neo-nationalist political advocacy group founded in 2017 by Antonio Valdés. It was established by supporters of Philippine President Rodrigo Duterte. The group's aims were to "defend the country, protect the people and support the president" from perceived opponents, including Islamist and Marxist–Leninist–Maoist extremists (mainly ISIS-inspired groups and CPP–NPA, respectively), organized crime groups, and supporters of the Liberal Party, the Liberals being the largest party in opposition to Duterte's PDP–Laban.

The group had received support from some government officials, including former Department of Justice secretary Vitaliano Aguirre II and Public Attorney's Office Chairperson Pérsida Acosta. Conversely, its establishment has drawn criticism from the opposition, mainly the national-democratic alliance Bagong Alyansang Makabayan.

In 2018, the group merged into the Katipunan ng Demokratikong Pilipino, which was in turn registered as a political party.

== See also ==
- Diehard Duterte Supporters
- Duterte Youth
