= Bolsonarism =

Political ideology of Jair Bolsonaro

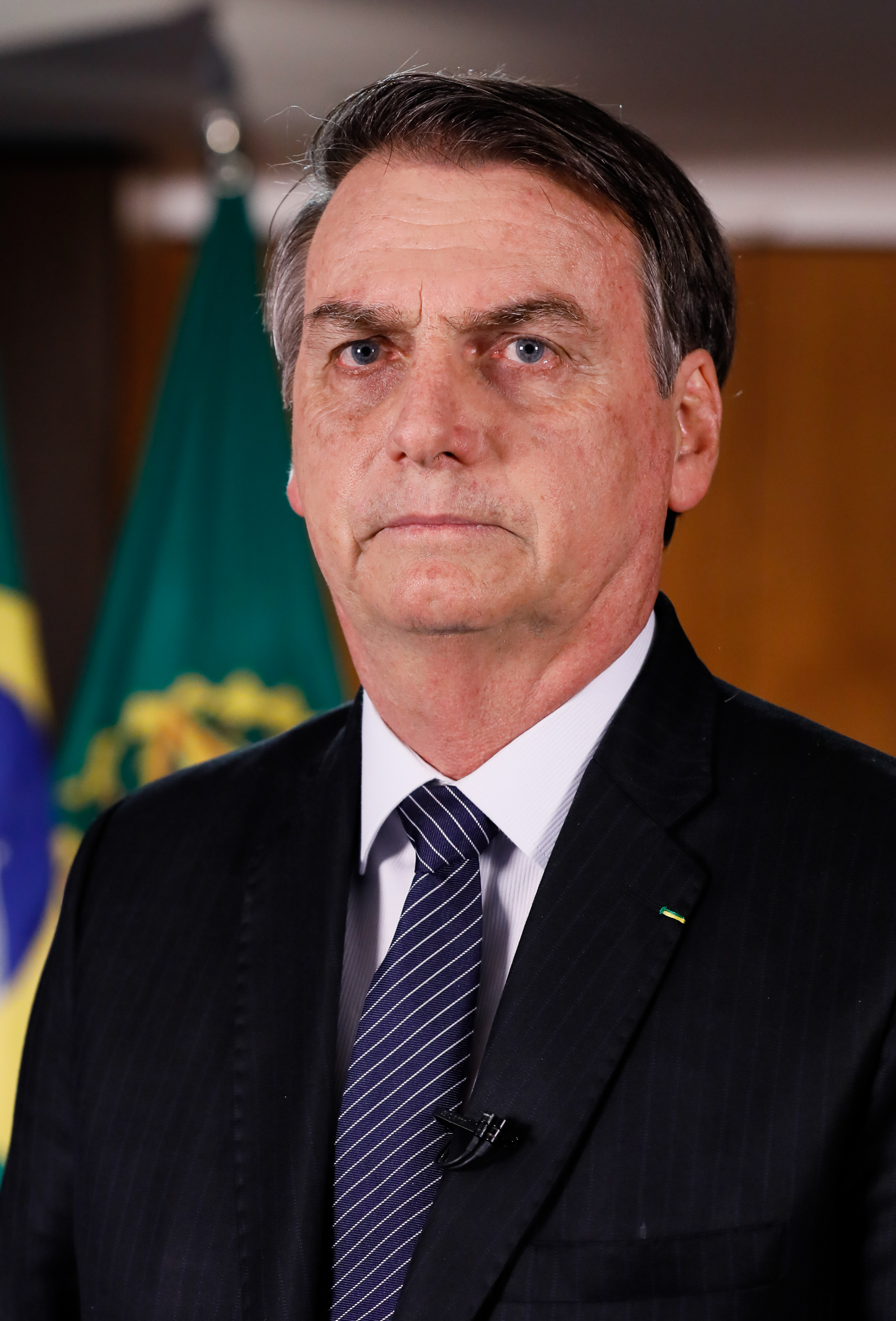
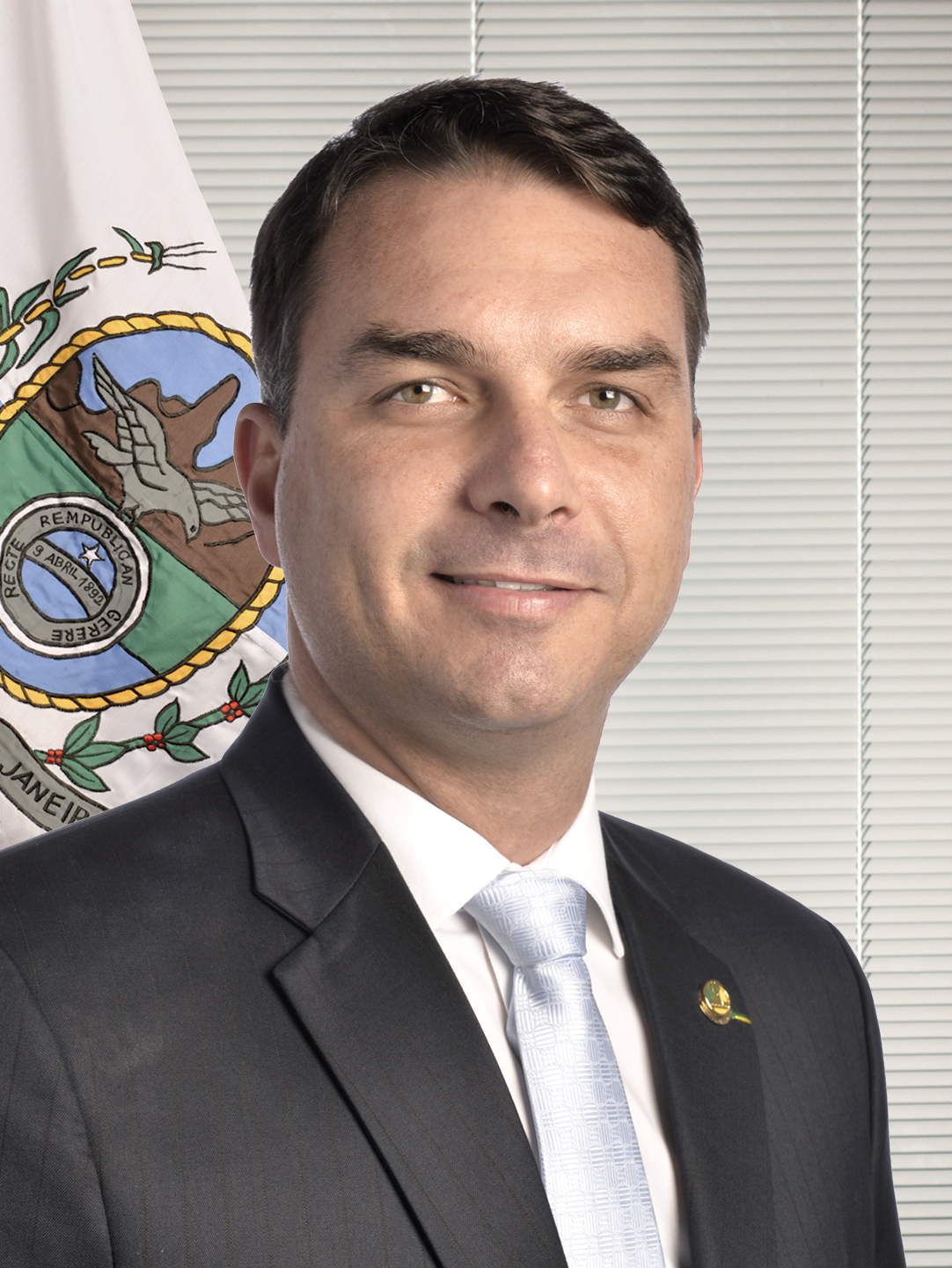
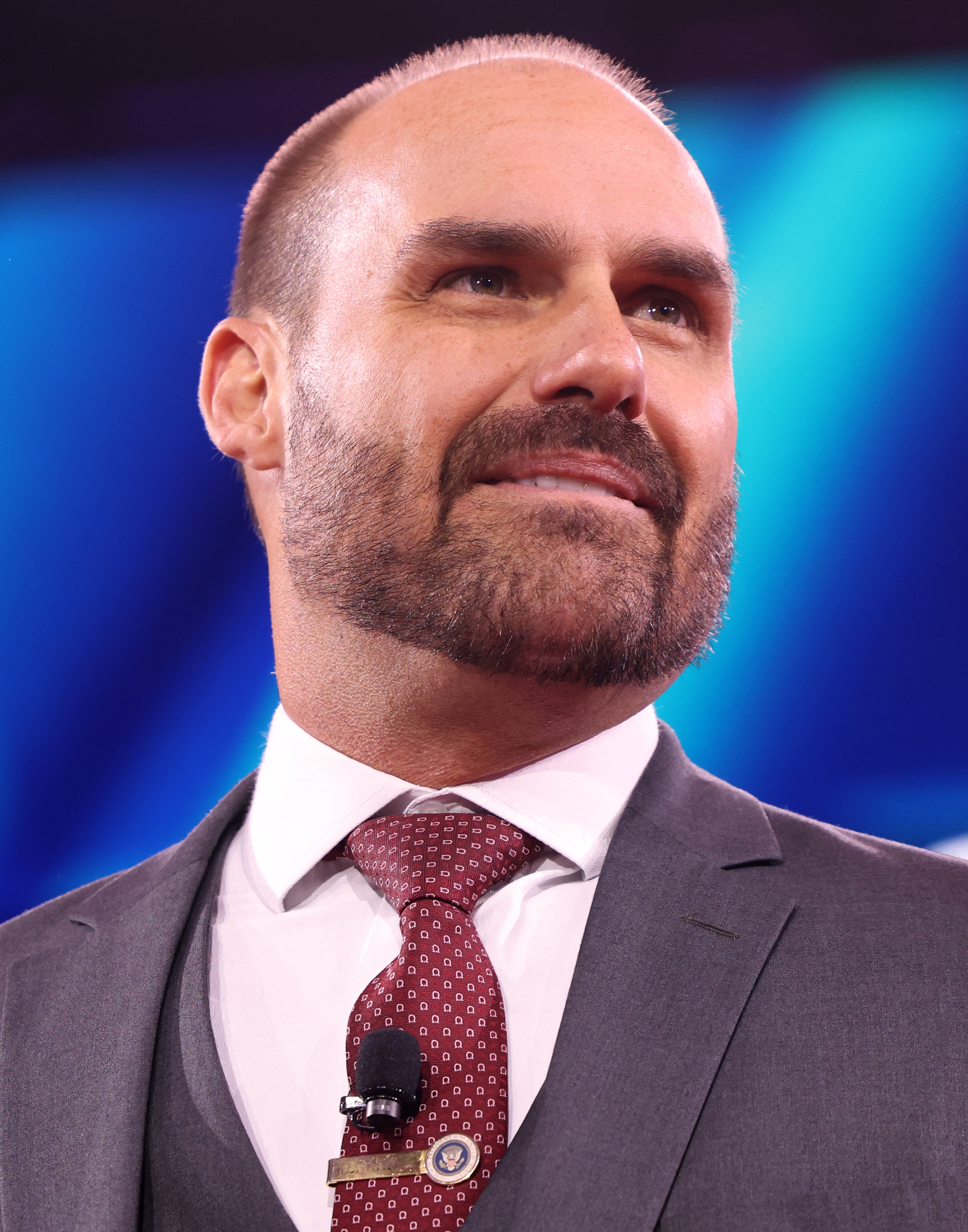
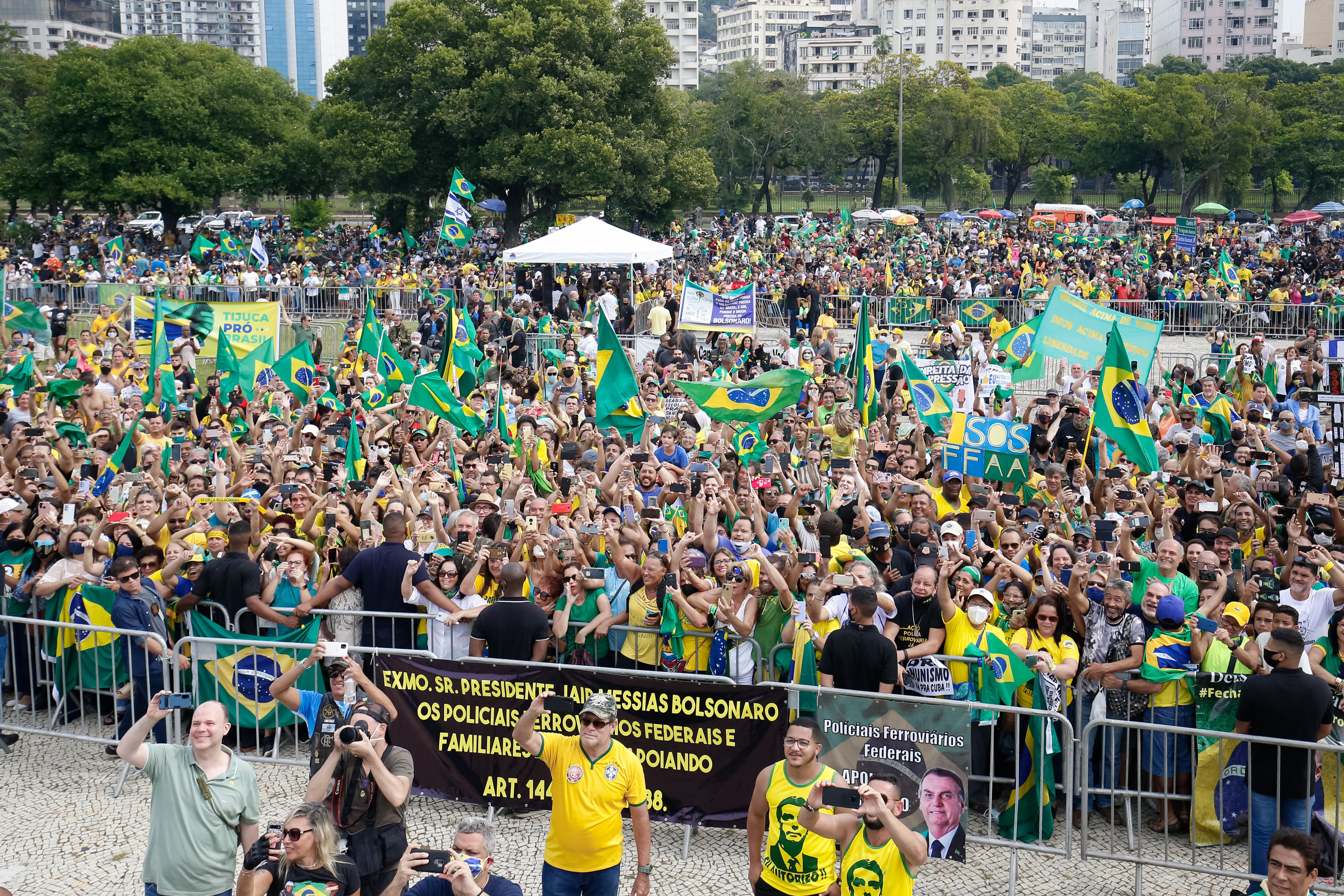
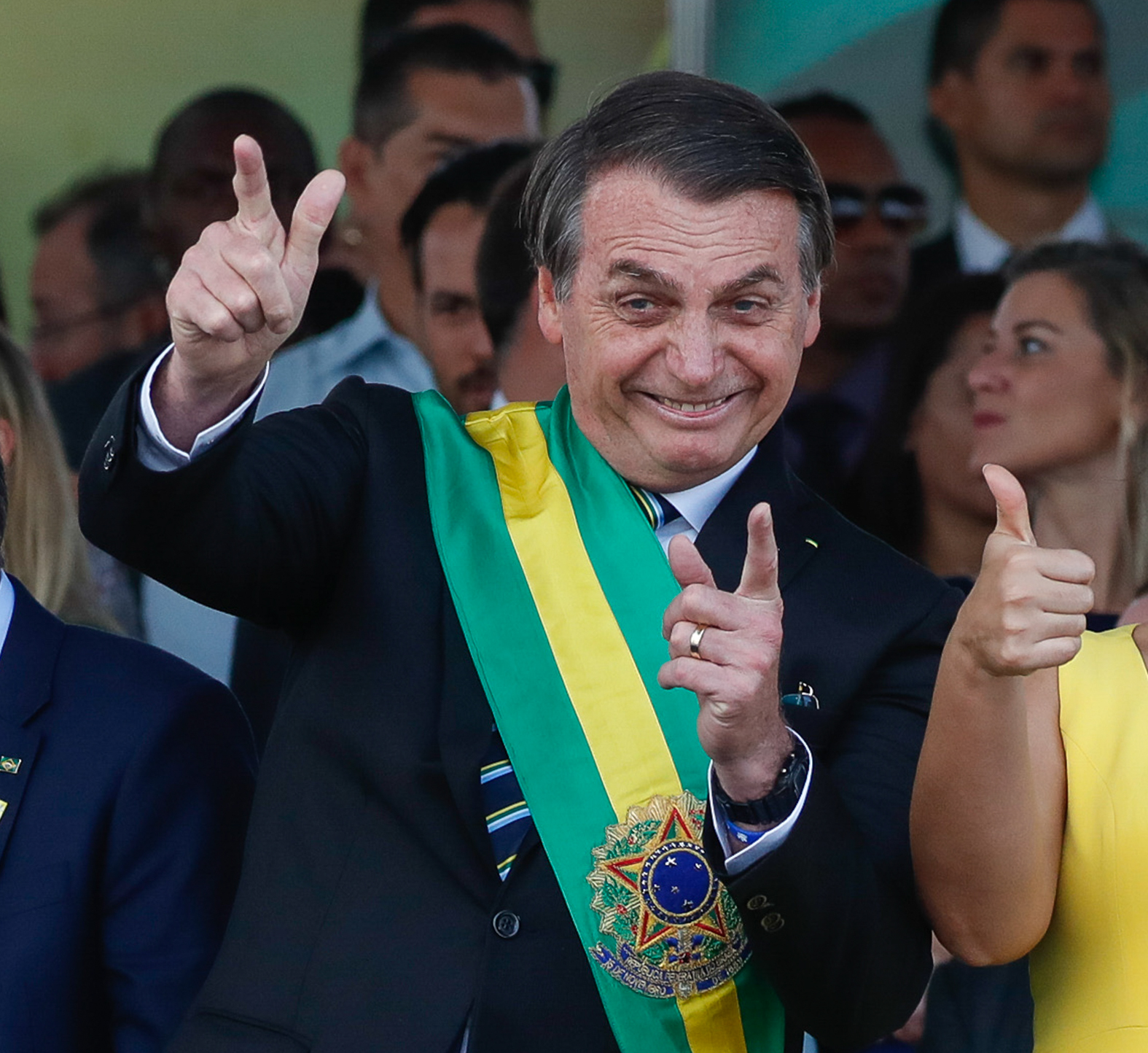
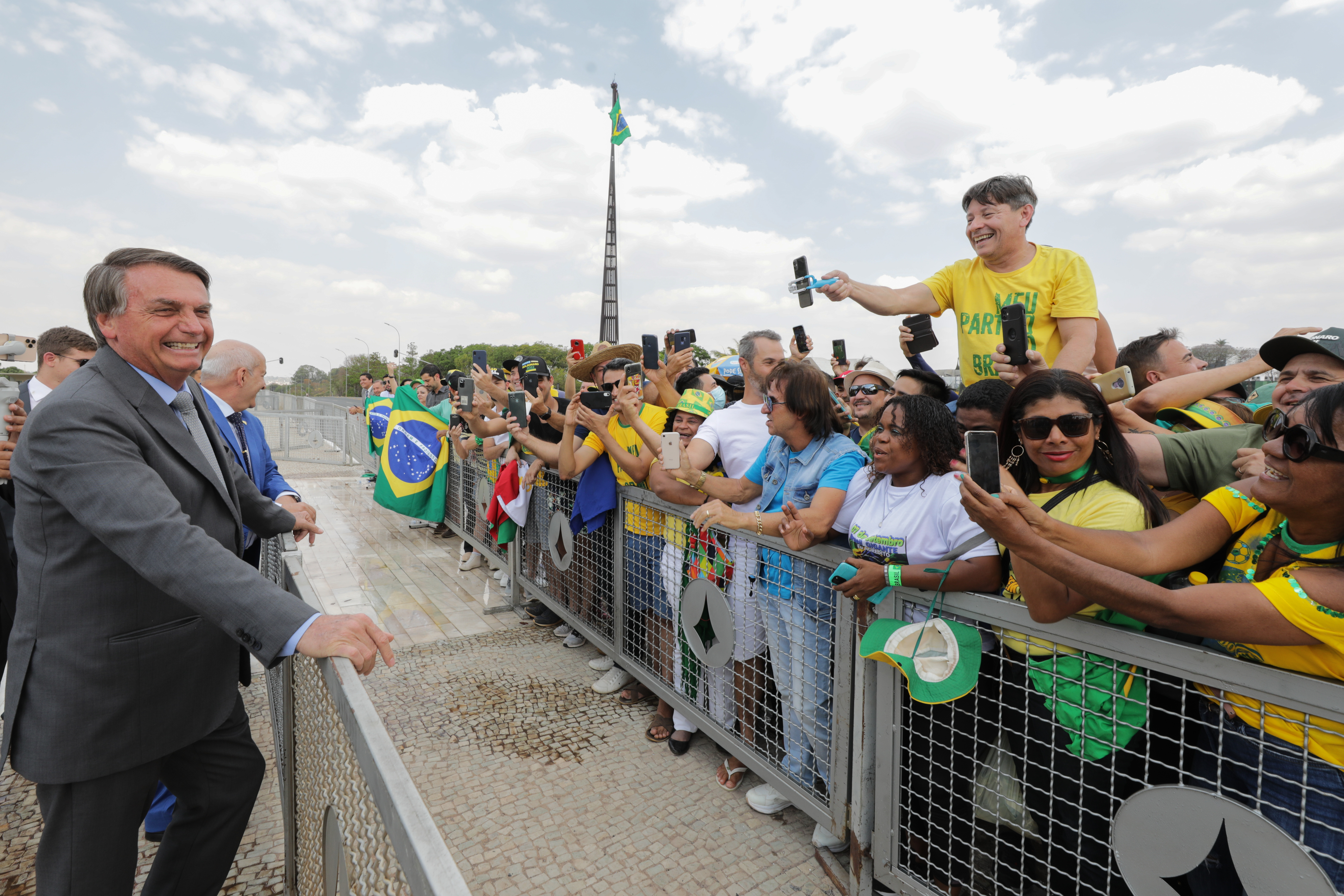
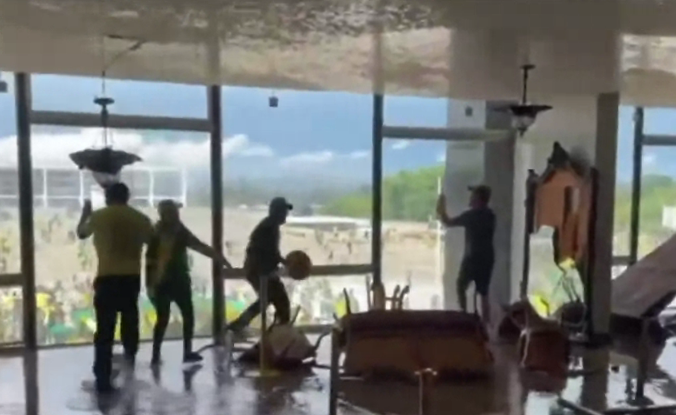
From left to right, top to bottom:
- Jair Bolsonaro
- Flávio Bolsonaro
- Eduardo Bolsonaro
- Crowd of Bolsonaro supporters in Rio de Janeiro
- Jair Bolsonaro making his well-known finger gun gesture
- Jair Bolsonaro meeting with supporters at the Palácio do Planalto
- Crowds of Bolsonaro supporters vandalize and destroy numerous works and pieces at the Planalto Palace during the 8 January Brasília attacks

Bolsonarism (Portuguese: bolsonarismo) is an ideology or the political movement tied to Jair Bolsonaro and his family. His views, policies, and supporters are variously described as far-right populism and also neo-fascism by scholars and news outlets, although Bolsonaro denied that he is a fascist, and some analysts disagree with such labelling. An alternate suggested term is illiberalism, which other than Bolsonarism includes such movements as Orbanism in Hungary, Trumpism in the United States and Putinism in Russia. Bolsonarism broke out in Brazil with the rise in popularity of Bolsonaro, especially during his campaign in the presidential election in 2018, which elected him as president. The Workers' Party (PT) crisis during the Dilma Rousseff government, precipitated and accelerated by the political-economic crisis of 2014, strengthened Bolsonarist ideology and the Brazilian new right, which are part of the context of the rise of New Right populism at an international level.

In politics, figures from Bolsonarism, such as Bolsonaro's son Eduardo Bolsonaro, have sought to attract punishments and international sanctions for Brazil in order to free Bolsonaro from being legally judged according to Brazilian laws, which has triggered a US tariff on the country. Likewise, pro-Bolsonaro deputies, with the support of parties such as União Brasil, PP, and Novo, tried to block, intimidate, destabilize, and impede the functioning of the legal entities of the legislature (Senate and Congress) as a form of blackmail for their objectives, such as making it difficult to vote on government projects that benefit workers (such as the exemption from income tax) and trying to free Jair Bolsonaro and those involved in the coup attempt and extremists from the January 8 attacks. Bolsonaro supporters have also repeatedly threatened to kill Brazilian authorities and politicians.

== Bolsonarist policies ==
Bolsonarism was the predominant ideology of the Bolsonaro government and, according to its critics, is associated with rhetoric defending the family, patriotism, conservatism, anti-communism, scientific denialism, carrying weapons, and aversion to the political left, as well as the cult of the figure of Bolsonaro, often called a "myth". Writer Olavo de Carvalho is often cited as having been the "guru" of the Bolsonarist ideology.

Although Bolsonaro defined his government as "free from ideological constraints", and did not recognize Bolsonarism as an ideology, his supporters – pejoratively called "Bolsominions" – diverge between those who agree with Bolsonaro and those who use the term to express their political position. Bolsonarism has been placed on the right-wing to the far-right.

Bolsonarism supports economic liberalism, neoliberalism, and militarism, while engaging in right-wing populism and authoritarianism. Scholars and commentators have described bolsonarism as ultraconservative and neo-fascist.

Bolsonaro through his political career has opposed human rights and minority rights in Brazil, and under his presidency human and minority rights were increasingly targeted by government policies.

While being against "globalism", Bolsonaro sought to work with various other neo-fascist, far-right, and authoritarian political parties, groups, and strategists to combat left-wing politics across central and south America. Efforts towards this goal included helping to set up the Madrid Forum.

=== Anti-Workers' Party and anti-communism ===
Hostility towards the Workers' Party constituted a large part of rhetoric from Bolsonaro and among his supporters. Bolsonaro combined this anti-Workers' Party rhetoric with anti-communist sentiment, using the Workers' Party membership in the São Paulo Forum as a line of attack, with him describing the São Paulo Forum as "a political group with a left-wing communist ideology, led by Lula and Fidel Castro".

Bolsonaro adopted the motto of "our flag will never be red" during his campaign for the Brazilian presidency, which had been used by his supporters since 2015. During Bolsonaro's inauguration he said to the crowd of people that Brazil had begun to "liberate itself from socialism". During his presidency he sought to dismantle organisations that he referred to as "dens of leftism", such as the public health research foundation Oswaldo Cruz Foundation. Bolsonarists would also label any criticism of Bolsonaro as coming from such "dens". Vocal supporters of Bolsonaro from his political party, such as Coronel Fernanda, have since Bolsonaro's election introduced bills seeking to criminalise support for communism in Brazil. The prominence of the slogan led Pablo López Guelli to title his documentary about the control of Brazilian media and subsequent distrust of the media, after the slogan.

=== Social conservatism ===
Bolsonarism presents feminist, LGBTQ, and anti-racist movements as responsible for the supposed "moral chaos" of Brazilian society. Faced with this, Bolsonarism argues that the traditional family and Christian values must be defended. This rhetoric is also linked to growth of evangelical prosperity theology, which associates economic success with individual merit, and is used to legitimize the movement's neoliberal policies. Several major evangelical churches publicly endorsed Bolsonaro in the lead-up to the 2018 presidential election, with him gaining 21.7 % of the vote among evangelical Christians, compared to 9.7 % for Fernando Haddad of the Workers' Party.

== Attacks ==
Some of Bolsonaro's supporters, in his name or based on his right-wing ideas, have carried out several riots and have been involved in political violence. These included the 8 January Brasília attacks against the election of the left-wing candidate for the presidency, Luiz Inácio Lula da Silva, which occurred after widespread misinformation of election fraud, and sought to instigate a coup d'état.

== See also ==
- Bolsominion
- Brazilian integralism
- Conservatism in Brazil
- Fascism in Brazil
- Military dictatorship in Brazil

=== Similar ideologies ===
- Berlusconism
- Bibism
- Cartismo
- Dutertismo
- Fujimorism
- Mileism
- Orbanism
- Pinochetism
- Putinism
- Trumpism
- Uribism
