= Orbanism =

Political ideology of Viktor Orbán

Orbanism Orbánizmus
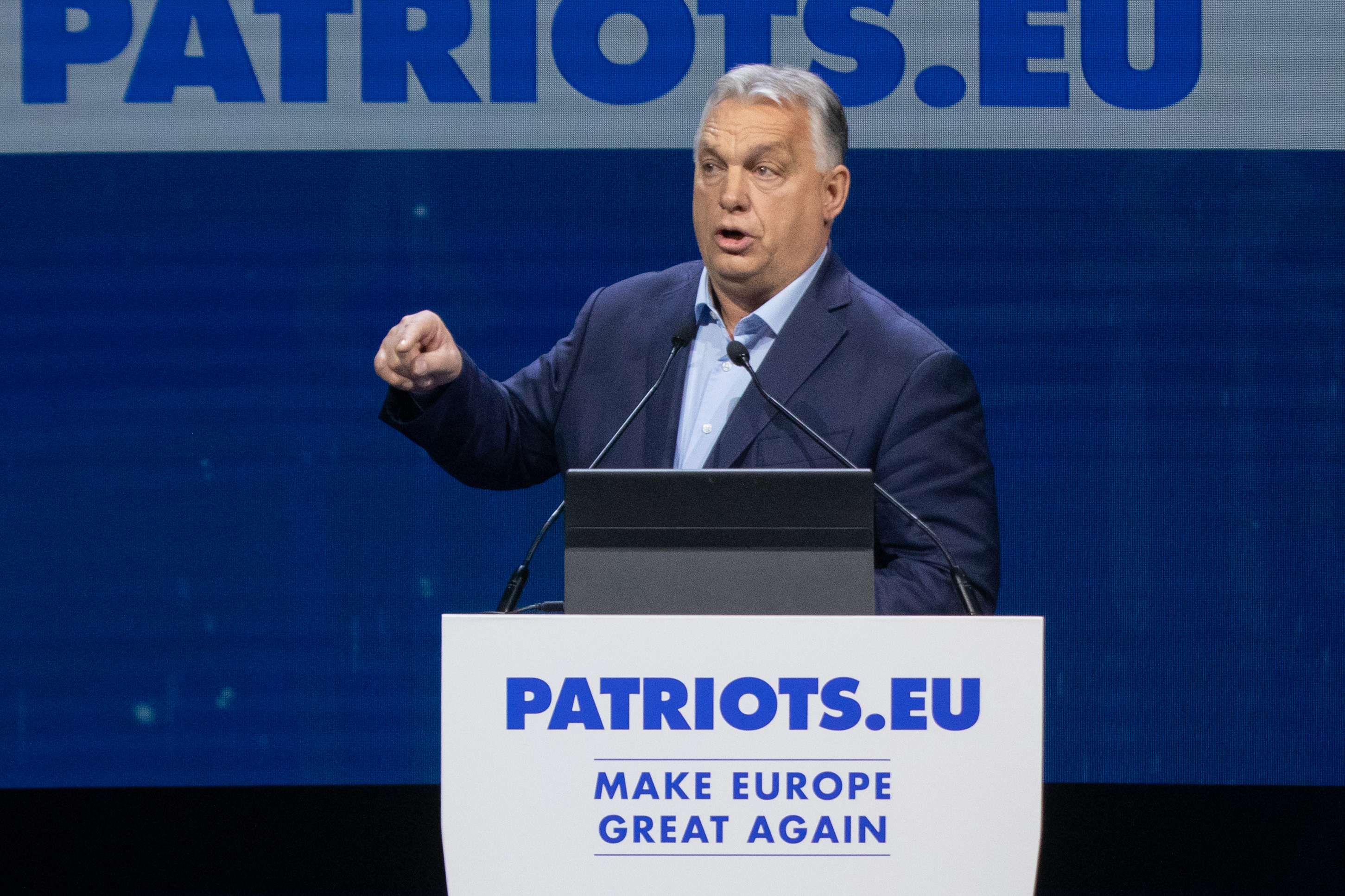
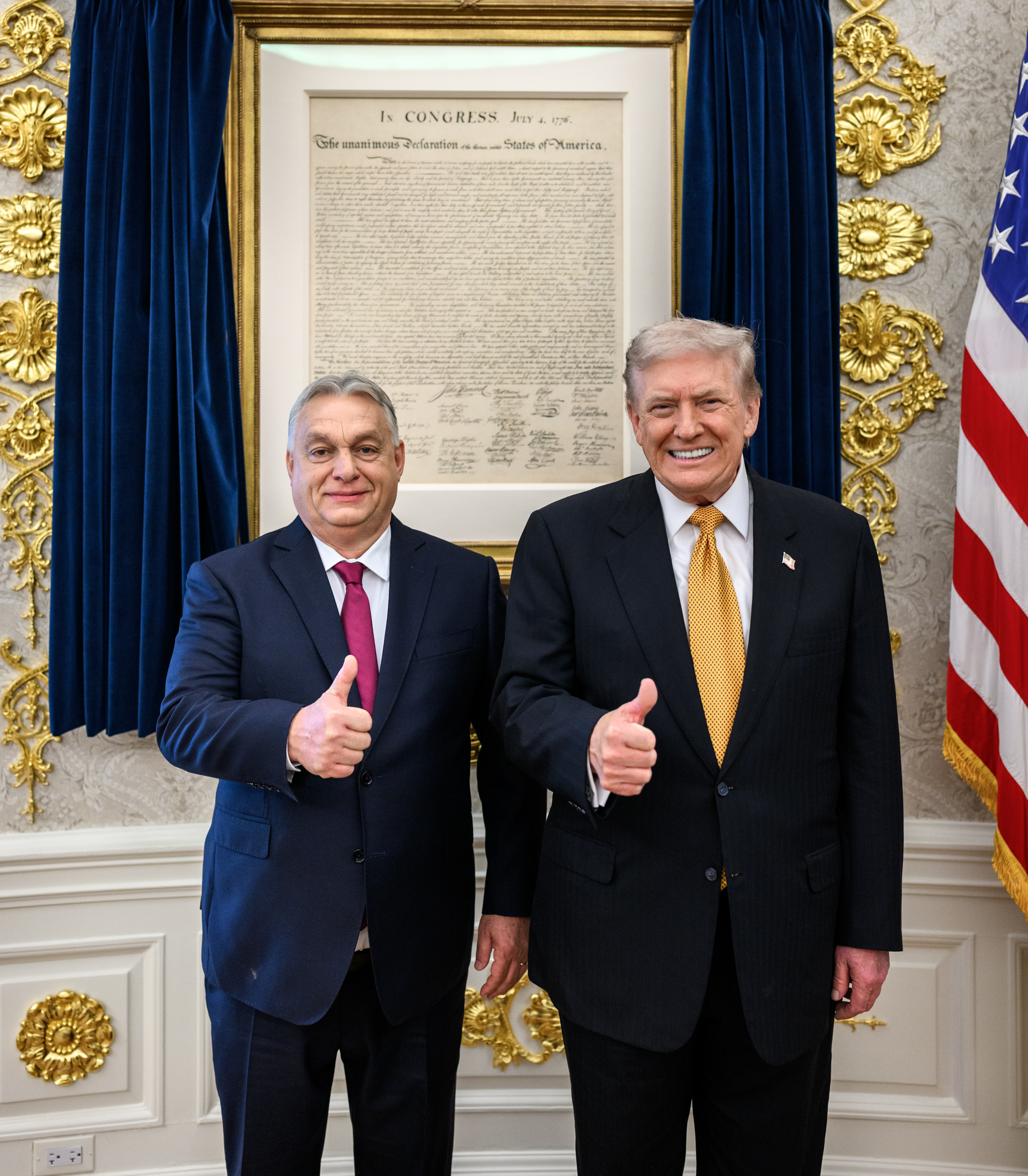
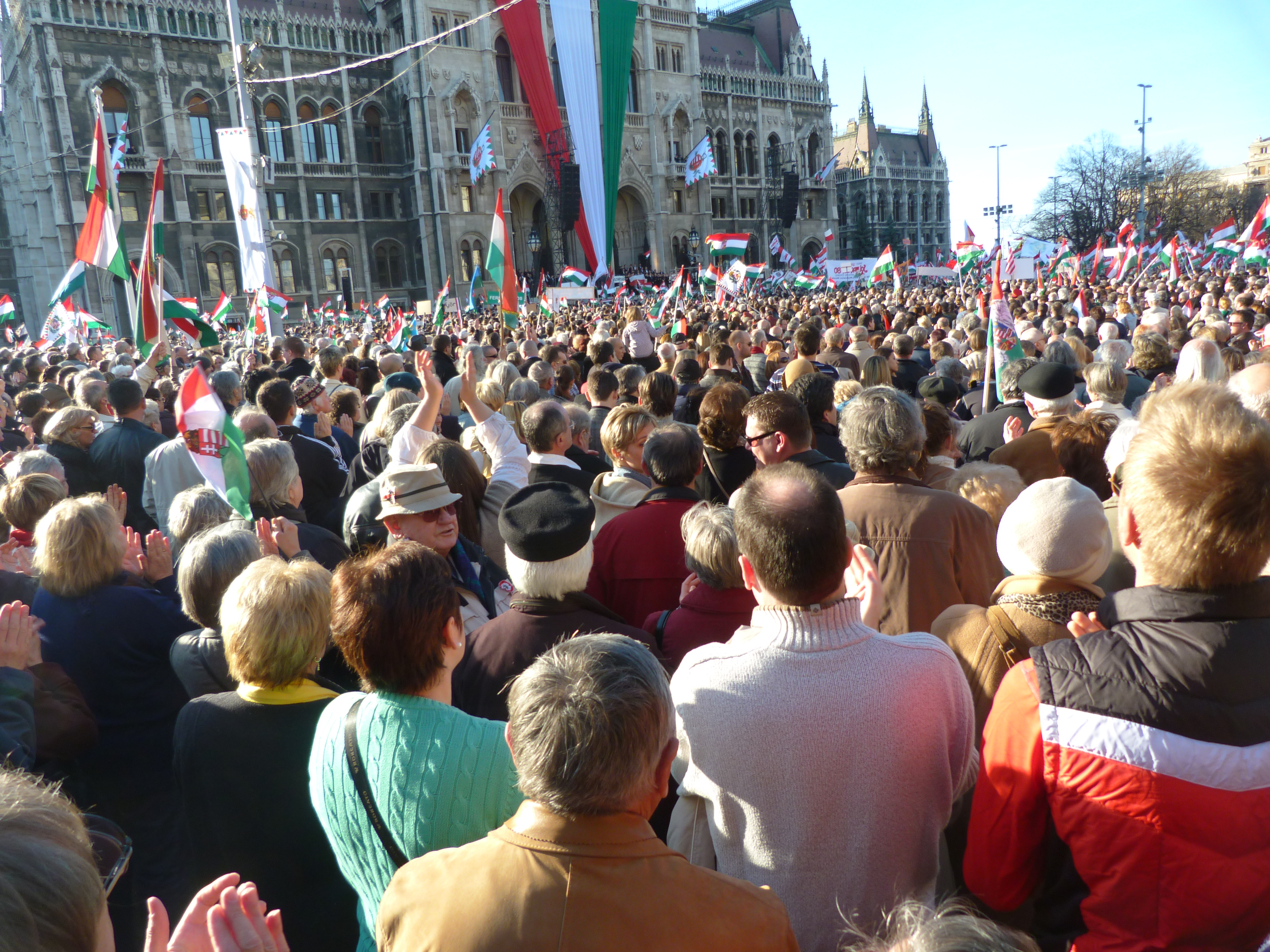
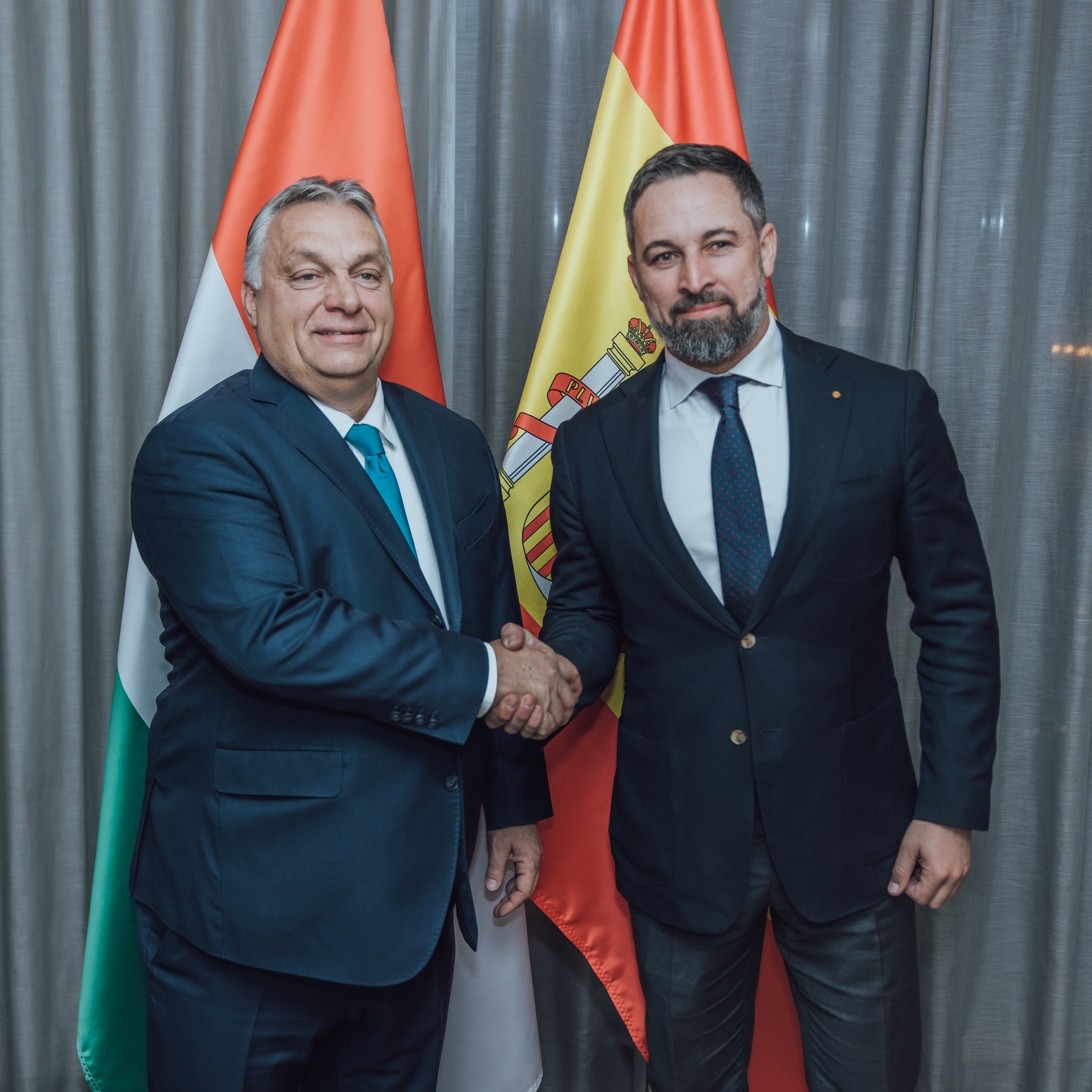
- From left to right, top to bottom: Orbán speaking at a Patriots.eu convention in 2025; Orbán with U.S. President Donald Trump; A rally in which Orbán spoke to a crowd at Kossuth Square; Orbán with President of Vox and President of Patriots.eu Santiago Abascal
- Leader: Viktor Orbán
- Founded: 25 April 2010; 16 years ago
- Membership: Fidesz; Fidelitas; Foundation for a Civic Hungary
- Ideology: Hungarian nationalism; Christian nationalism; Conservatism (Hungarian); Social conservatism; Illiberal democracy; Right-wing populism; Christian democracy; Euroscepticism
- Political position: Right-wing to far-right
- National affiliation: Fidesz–KDNP
- European affiliation: EPP (2004–2021); Patriots.eu (since 2024)
- European Parliament group: Patriots for Europe (since 2024) (Note: The party was formerly part of the European People's Party Group (2004–2021), and Non-Inscrits (2021–2024).)

Orbanism or Orbánism is a right-wing to far-right political ideology or governance style associated with Viktor Orbán, the Prime Minister of Hungary from 1998 to 2002 and from 2010 to 2026. It is influenced by the concept of illiberal democracy and also draws from Hungarian history. Advocates of Orbanism describe it as an example of conservative and rightist success, calling it "true conservativism".

== Background ==
Over the years, Orbán's and Fidesz's ideology moved steadily to the right shifting the once-conservative-liberal, pro-European party during the 1990s and 2000s towards Euroscepticism, right-wing populism, national conservatism during the 2010s.

During the 2010 Hungarian election, vestiges of Orbanism emerged as Victor Orbán became increasingly challenged by the older liberal politicians, intellectuals, and the media elite who attempted to influence policymaking. There was also the SZDSZ's coalition with the post-communist MSZP, led by Gyula Horn. In response, Orbán eschewed liberalism in favor of conservatism. He then shifted to a more populist direction and sought to build an ideology that is based on Hungarian reality, identity, and history. He has avowed contempt for "corruption, sex, and violence". A core component of Orbanism is its embrace and defense of Christian democracy and values. Orbán, himself, called the ideology as a Christian project. He pursues it through his Fidesz political party.

== Illiberal democracy ==
Orbanism abandons liberal methods and principles in organizing society. Some sources describe it as a system that is close to autocracy although it is still in line with EU norms. Essentially, it is a philosophy that seeks to maximize the power of the government. To achieve this, it maintains that escalation is expected from the beginning.

Orbanism's innovation is said to have stemmed from its success in combining American-style self-confidence with a politics of indignation. It has been described as an ideology that emerged from Europe edges, characterized by a confrontational style and strong leadership. Orbán described this as more stable in comparison with European liberalism, which he characterized as a system that has morphed into a tyranny of political correctness and mainstream politics. According to Orbán, "it is not a simple sum of individuals, but a community that needs to be organized, strengthened, and developed" into an "illiberal state".

In Orbanism, the civil society's role is diminished in favor of a strong state. In 2024, for instance, the Sovereignty Protection Authority, a new governmental body with sweeping investigative powers, started rooting out foreign influence in politics, academia, and the media. This is also seen in the government's policy towards the media. An advisor to Fidesz explained the philosophy, stating that "positive discrimination promoting the representation of right values in the press is morally justified" as these are suppressed under socialism.

== Nationalism ==
Orbanism, as a political movement, also renews the language of populism so that it is deployed from the position of the government. Orbán is known for his controversial rhetoric such as his criticism of the mixing of European and non-European races. The reference to history in Orbanism can be demonstrated in the way it upholds certain events in Hungarian society such as the Holy Crown or Horthy's regime and also in the approach of the idea of nation as exclusive. Orban's policy has emphasized national sovereignty and consistently opposed external interference in Hungarian affairs. Although his emphasis on sovereignty is questionable and dubious due to Russia's close ties to Viktor Orbán's Fidesz party.

Orbanism's take on economic policy has been described as ideologically complex and unorthodox. It is a combination of neo-liberal elements, which include flat tax, drastic social security tax, the total delegation of social responsibilities to the local governments, and austerity in the education system, among others. These are mixed with populist elements (e.g. administrative cuts in household expenses) and state intervention (e.g. market regulation, nationalization, and state monopolies). Orbán's vision includes the so-called "workfare" society, which is illiberal in nature and is patterned after the examples set by Russia, China, and Turkey.

In terms of foreign policy, Orbanism favors a militaristic philosophy. The goal is to operationalize the interests of the Hungarian people. It is based on the "revolutionary government" idea, where the government protects the people against enemies and these include immigrants, the elites, and foreign powers, among others. Orbanism also repeatedly clash with the European Union position, particularly on Ukraine and migration.

== Orbanism vs. Gaullism ==
Orbanism has been compared with Gaullism due to its similarities. For instance, both political movements are anti-liberal and they also attempted to create a direct link with the people by circumventing the Parliament. They also tried to limit the capacity of independent bodies to control the actions of the government. There is also the element of national grandeur. De Gaulle held that "France cannot be France without greatness." Orbán also echoed this when he told US diplomats that "it's not complicated – we are telling the people that we will restore the nation's greatness".

In contrast to de Gaulle's ideology, Orbanism is seen as less coherent since it does not widen the margin of maneuver of the executive largely because of the Hungarian basic law, which frequently uses the two-thirds super majority rule. For instance, to create and modify the income tax bracket, two-thirds of the Parliament is required for its approval. There is also the case of the Hungarian Constitutional Court, which has the power to challenge the constitutionality of legislative action such as the amendment to the constitution.

== Orbanism's relationship to Putinism ==
Orban's transition from an Anti-Russian liberal to "Kremlin's best friend in Europe" started in 2012, becoming a right wing populist Eurosceptic. The EU protested a number of post-2010 laws and policies went against European political standards. Therefore, Hungary confronted fierce criticism from the EU governing bodies as well as Western constitutional experts. Observers assessed that Hungary made a "sharp U-turn" in its political development and is "retreating from democracy" towards "a one-party state" under the rule of Orbán. Putin ethnic nationalism and surveillance state system were a key concept in Orban's Hungary.

== Reception ==
Orbanism has found favor among conservatives in the United States. His "illiberalism" or opposition to liberal democracy appealed to those who fear demographic decline and the displacement of Christian values. The ideology was featured in August 2021 in Tucker Carlson's show. According to Carlson, Orbanism is a positive example for Americans as a system based on political will, demonstrating how a country based on traditional values, national identity, and Christian traditions can be successful.

Donald Trump's former chief strategist, Steve Bannon, once called Orbán "Trump before Trump".

There are critics who explain that Orbanism is merely characterized by three main features. The first is the maximization of personal power and control more than any specific ideological commitment or vision. Second, Orbán adopts different ideological standpoints as and when necessary. Finally, there is the rejection of consensus through deliberation and politics is treated as a zero-sum game. This view dismisses Orbanism as an ideological movement but a systematic project designed to expand Orbán's personal power.

== See also ==
- Fidesz propaganda
- George Soros conspiracy theories
- Putinisation
- Related ideologies:
  - Authoritarianism (Autocracy)
    - Authoritarian conservatism
    - Authoritarian nationalism
  - Economic nationalism (Orbanomics)

=== Similar ideologies ===
- Berlusconism
- Bolsonarism
- Cartismo
- Dutertismo
- Erdoğanism
- Fujimorism
- Pinochetism
- Putinism
- Trumpism
