= Bolsominion =

Pejorative term applied to Jair Bolsonaro's supporters

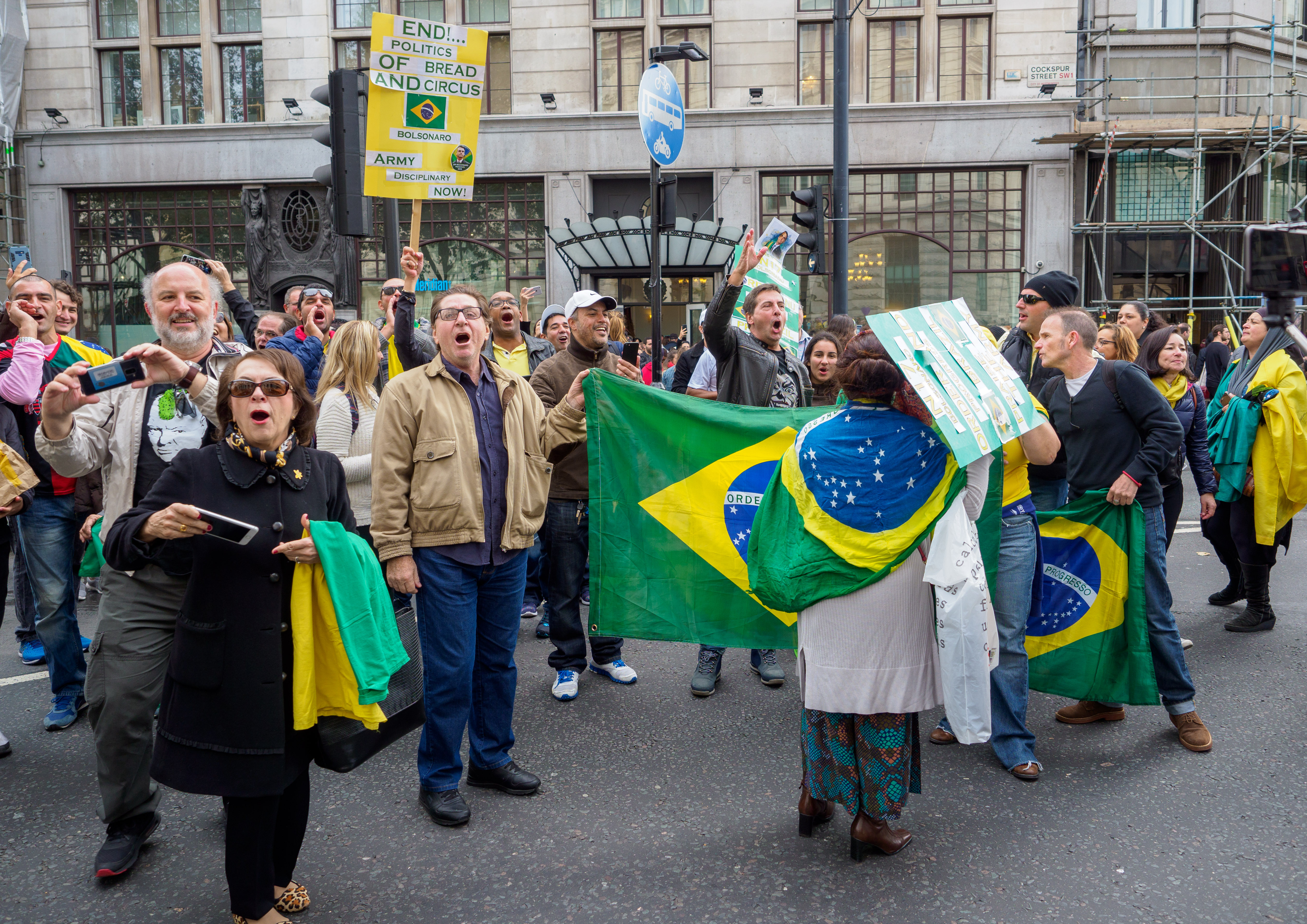
Supporters of Jair Bolsonaro demonstrating in London

Bolsominion (from the English minion) is a pejorative term used in Brazil to refer to supporters of former president Jair Bolsonaro. The term combines the surname Bolsonaro with the word minion, meaning "follower" or "supporter", and also recalls the popular animated characters from the Despicable Me franchise.

The term emerged during Bolsonaro's 2018 presidential campaign. It is often used by critics to describe his supporters, while some supporters reject the term, viewing it as derogatory and arguing it misrepresents their motivations, which include addressing corruption, supporting traditional family values, advocating free-market economics, and strengthening law enforcement measures. Analysts note that the term's use reflects Brazil's political polarisation, where rhetorical terms are employed by various groups to frame political opponents.

== Characteristics and ideology ==
The term "bolsominion" is usually invoked in critical or humorous contexts to describe individuals portrayed as ardent backers of Bolsonaro's leadership and agenda, often associated with conservative and populist principles. Detractors depict such supporters as aligned with far-right positions, including advocacy of greater military influence in governance, opposition to progressive social policies, and support for conservative norms in education, ethics, and public safety. Proponents counter that such portrayals overlook the movement's emphasis on national sovereignty, economic reform, and anti-establishment sentiment against entrenched political elites.

In digital discussions, exchanges of political insults between Bolsonaro's allies and opponents are frequent. Supporters may use terms such as "esquerdopata" ("pathological leftist") to denounce rivals, while critics respond with "direitopata" ("pathological rightist"). Commentators have also noted affinities between parts of Bolsonaro's constituency and the base of former U.S. president Donald Trump, citing shared populist themes.

Many in the movement prefer self-identifiers such as "bolsonaristas" or "patriots," rejecting "bolsominion" as a construct of mainstream media used to disparage their patriotic motivations. Surveys suggest Bolsonaro continues to command significant popular support, highlighting the resilience of his platform despite ongoing controversies.

== Usage and cultural impact ==
The term has appeared in political commentary and popular media. In 2019, federal deputy Eduardo Bolsonaro, one of Jair's sons, hosted a Despicable Me Minions-themed birthday party, which media outlets interpreted as a playful reference to the "bolsominion" label.

After Bolsonaro's presidency, the term continued to surface in coverage of events such as the 8 January Brasília attacks, where demonstrators contested alleged electoral irregularities.

== See also ==
- Bolsonarism
- Conservatism in Brazil
- Political polarization
- Right-wing populism
- Internet meme
- Diehard Duterte Supporters
- MAGA movement

== Bibliography ==
- Indursky, Alexei Conte (21 May 2020). "Psicanálise, fascismo e populismo: notas sobre a emergência do bolsonarismo no Brasil". Teoría y Crítica de la Psicología. 14 (2020): 150–162. ISSN 2116-3480.
- Moraes, Alex Martins (2019). "Nossa direitização em três tempos: origens, agora e mais além". Somanlu: Revista de Estudos Amazônicos. 19 (1): 6–17. doi:10.29327/233099.19.2-1.
- Oliveira, Natasha Ribeiro de (2020). A febre amarela "minions": uma análise bakhtiniana (Thesis). Araraquara: Universidade Estadual Paulista.
- Pinheiro-Machado, Rosana; Scalco, Lucia Mury (March 2020). "From hope to hate: The rise of conservative subjectivity in Brazil". HAU: Journal of Ethnographic Theory. 10 (1): 21–31. doi:10.1086/708627. S2CID 212916540.
- De Paula, Luciane; De Oliveira, Natasha Ribeiro de (24 March 2020). "Minions nas telas e bolsominions na vida: uma análise bakhtiniana". Letrônica. 13 (2) e36198. doi:10.15448/1984-4301.2020.2.36198.
- Paula, Luciane de; Oliveira, Natasha Ribeiro de (13 November 2020). "Viralização amarela: os minions na vida, nas mídias e na arte". Revista Diálogos (in Portuguese). 8 (3): 74–95. ISSN 2319-0825.
- Recuero, Raquel da Cunha (10 December 2019). "Disputas discursivas, legitimação e desinformação: o caso Veja x Bolsonaro nas eleições brasileiras de 2018". Comunicação Mídia e Consumo. 16 (47): 432–458. doi:10.18568/cmc.v16i47.2013.
- Reis, Mauricio Martins; João, Catharine Black Lipp (18 October 2019). "A polarização política brasileira e os efeitos (anti) democráticos da democracia deliberativa". Teorias do Direito e Realismo Jurídico (in Portuguese). 5 (1): 1–22. doi:10.26668/IndexLawJournals/2525-9601/2019.v5i1.5426. ISSN 2525-9601.
- Silveira, Letícia Pena (2018). "Memes: a ostentação de neologismos e uma ferramenta de ensino". Revista GTLex. 4 (1): 79–97. doi:10.14393/Lex7-v4n1a2018-5. ISSN 2447-9551. "Dessa forma, um bolsominion seria aquela pessoa que é servo, criado de Bolsonaro, aquele que o apoia e a todas as suas ações. Nesse caso, considera-se cruzamento lexical por hibridismo pelo fato de haver a junção de uma palavra do vernáculo e outra do inglês."
- "Did Brazilians Vote for Jair Bolsonaro Because They Share his Most Controversial Views?". SciELO. 2020.
