= Diehard Duterte Supporters =

Supporters of Rodrigo Duterte

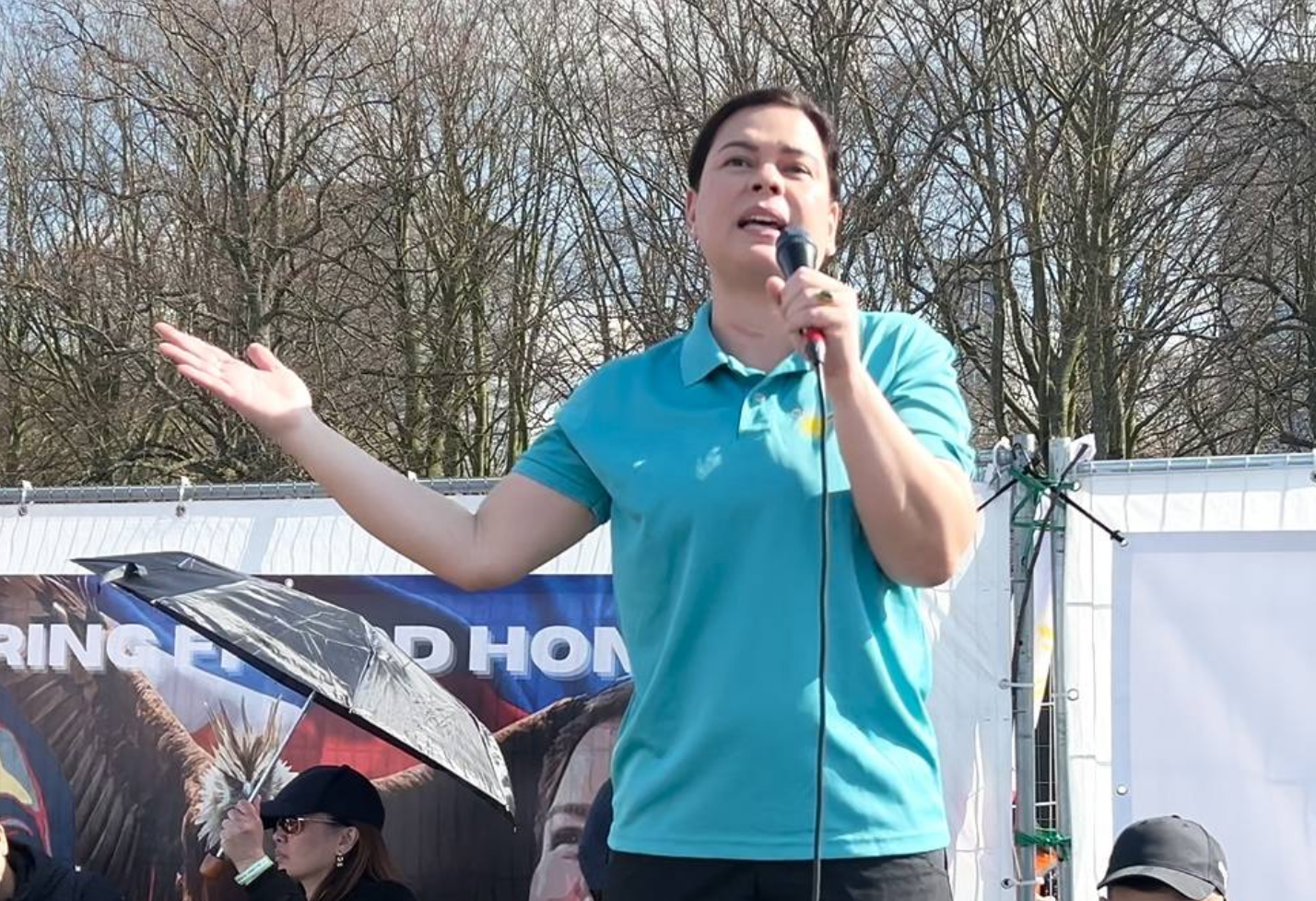
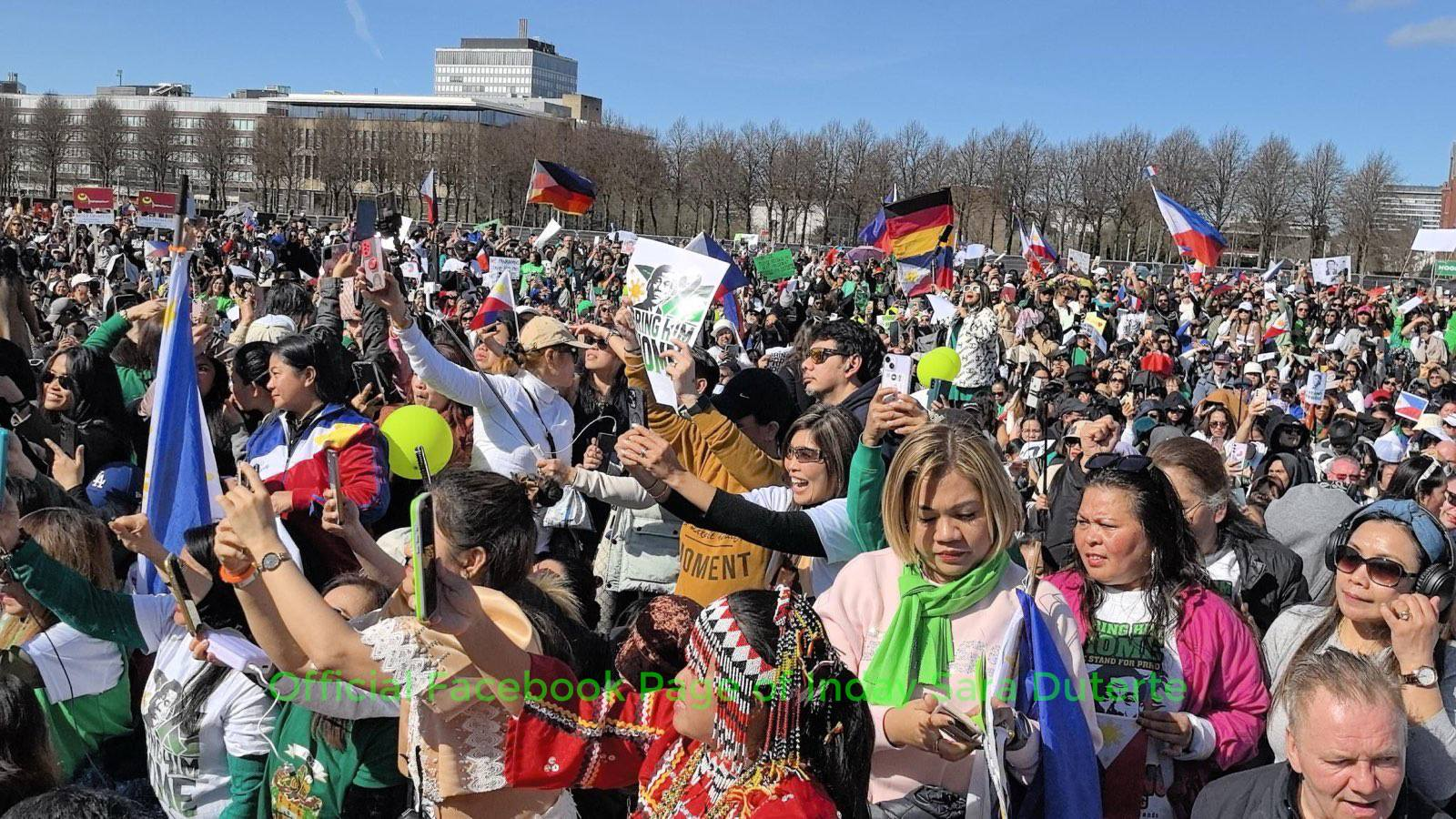
- From top to bottom, left to right: Rodrigo Duterte interacts with supporters; Rodrigo Duterte gets a warm welcome from supporters upon his arrival; Sara Duterte addresses supporters calling for her father's release; Over 5,000 supporters of Rodrigo Duterte from all over Europe
- Leader: Rodrigo Duterte; Sara Duterte
- Founded: November 27, 2015; 10 years ago
- Ideology: Dutertismo
- Political position: Right-wing to far-right
- National affiliation: PDP–Laban

"Diehard Duterte Supporters" (DDS) is a label popularly associated with, and also adopted by, the supporters of the 16th president of the Philippines, Rodrigo Duterte, whom they view as a necessary strongman. The term was popularized during the 2016 presidential election and has since been used to refer to the most "diehard" among Duterte's loyalists. The term is also commonly used by his opposition to describe people they allege to be engaging in internet trolling, fake news, cult of personality promotion, and disruptive behavior online to defend Duterte. The term DDS has also been used to refer to supporters of other members of the Duterte family, particularly Sara Duterte and her bid for presidency in 2028.

Its initialism, DDS, was taken directly from the Davao Death Squad, a death squad allegedly founded by Rodrigo Duterte, that existed in Davao City during his tenure as mayor.

== Ideology ==
As their self-appellation suggests, the DDS are identified by their unwavering loyalty to Rodrigo Duterte and his daughter, Sara Duterte, rather than alignment to any particular political-economic ideology. The DDS mirror Duterte's policy stances and shifts, even when such shifts contradict his self-identification as a socialist and membership in a democratic socialist party, (Note: National democrats, along with others who are placed to the left of social democrats and democratic socialists on the political spectrum, themselves refute Duterte's self-proclaimed socialist credentials given his inability, due to structural constraints, to concretely and seriously tackle the economic aspects of liberalism. Such constraints have had a similar dampening effect on the actions of other socialist leaders such as François Mitterrand and Evo Morales. Significantly, however, and unlike his predecessors, Duterte is the first Philippine president to have had "no reservations" in openly declaring his ostensible socialism while operating within a hostile political-economic environment, drawing comparisons to Bernie Sanders' renormalization of the previously taboo term socialism in US political discourse.) PDP–Laban. Accordingly, observers have described the DDS as a right-wing populist or even far-right phenomenon the existence of which preserves the status quo. Such an assertion has been demonstrated by the expansion in recent years of the historical and religiously informed cultural hostility towards left-wing politics in the country, which has been previously reserved for the Communist Party of the Philippines (CPP) but during Duterte's presidency began to include left-wing national-democratic, social-democratic and social-liberal organizations such as the Makabayan, Akbayan and Liberal parties, respectively.

In common with Duterte's original support base outside Manila, the DDS had been enthusiastic about the subsequently derailed transition to a federal form of government through constitutional reform. Some within the DDS may have also stood behind socially progressive causes such as the redefinition of civil marriage, which Duterte had also supported but has since backtracked on. The DDS have also mirrored calls made by some core supporters for the installation of a revolutionary government with Duterte as leader. Such calls, however, have been motivated less by a willingness to pursue systemic transformation than by a desire for greater participation in the status quo.

== Behavior ==
The DDS are distinguished by their uninhibited use of rabid and vitriolic speech, which mirrors Duterte's own. They respond to the slightest criticism of Duterte with accusations of bias, drug addict, shilling, (Note: Shills are referred to as bayaran (literally "paid") in the national language which, to some extent, may also refer to prostitutes.) wokescolding, CPP membership or sympathizing with the New People's Army (NPA), notwithstanding Duterte's own tactical dealings with the National Democratic Front of the Philippines (NDFP) during his mayorship of Davao. The DDS usually engage in online bullying and harassment against all activists, as well as the Otso Diretso electoral alliance, Vice President Leni Robredo, and even fellow Dutertists suspected of disloyalty, often by issuing threats or tagging them implicitly for punishment. Dilawan (Note: Dilawan loosely translates as "Yellow-supporter" in the national language, in reference to the color employed by protesters in the People Power Revolution. This usage, however, is a misnomer given how Duterte's own party had participated in the protests and was indeed co-founded by none other than Corazón Aquino's husband. In addition, Sara Duterte, Duterte's daughter, recounts how her father had helped sear the significance of EDSA I into her mind.) and pulahan are two of the slurs most frequently employed to shut down or gaslight those marked for harassment. The DDS have also participated in amplified smear campaigns directed against organizers of and contributors to COVID-19 mutual-aid efforts. It is for these reasons that the DDS are collectively considered even by otherwise sympathetic analysts as a successful hate group. In midst of the arrest of Duterte done by the International Criminal Court, DDS flooded social media platforms with posts and comments that show loyalty and gratitude to Duterte as well as calling his critics "drug addict."

International Criminal Court (ICC) Judge Iulia Motoc, presiding over the case against former Philippine President Rodrigo Duterte, has been targeted by his supporters online. Following Duterte's initial hearing on March 14, 2025, these supporters inundated Motoc's LinkedIn account with comments demanding his release and return to the Philippines. Additionally, misinformation circulated, falsely linking Motoc to the Marcos family through misidentified photographs. Critics also questioned her suitability based on her use of French during proceedings, despite her proficiency in multiple languages. Legal experts warn that such actions could negatively impact Duterte's case, as attempts to harass or manipulate court officials may be considered offenses against the administration of justice under Article 70 of the Rome Statute.

Long before the DDS' ascent to national prominence, however, certain PMC actors themselves had allegedly orchestrated smear campaigns, known locally as "black propaganda", through SMS and other means against disfavored politicians and unapproved-of election candidates. Such derision has been described as a desire on the part of members of the PMC to "want to humiliate their adversaries by attributing to them a desperate lack of intelligence, empathy, and virtue".

== Organizational representation ==
Several organizations and social-media communities bear the DDS initialism as a way of signifying unapologetic allegiance to the Duterte family. Some of these are the Duterte Youth, Pederalismo ng Dugong Dakilang Samahan (PDDS) and Partido Federal ng Pilipinas (PFP). These organizations claim to represent sectors of Philippine society marginalized by those who had taken power through the first EDSA Revolution and betrayed by those behind the second.

== Global context ==
The DDS is part of an ascendant global far right; indeed, members find affinity with right-wing populist movements across the globe and their respective leaders. In the academic and popular discourse, parallels had been drawn between the DDS and other strongman populist movements such as Erdoğanism in Turkey, Bolsonarism in Brazil and Trumpism in the United States, among many others, notwithstanding the uniqueness of the conditions that give rise to and, in turn, motivate each of them. For instance, it has been demonstrated that popular support for Duterte has been driven to a significant extent by expatriate workers resentful of having to support themselves and their families from abroad, a motivating factor only partially shared by workers in core countries. In addition, far-right beliefs are prominent in Filipino culture.

== See also ==
- Davao Death Squad
- Dutertismo
- Mocha Uson Blog
- Noynoying
- Pinoy pride
- Sara Duterte 2028 presidential campaign
- Bolsominion
- MAGA movement
- Marcos loyalism
