= Political positions of Benjamin Netanyahu =

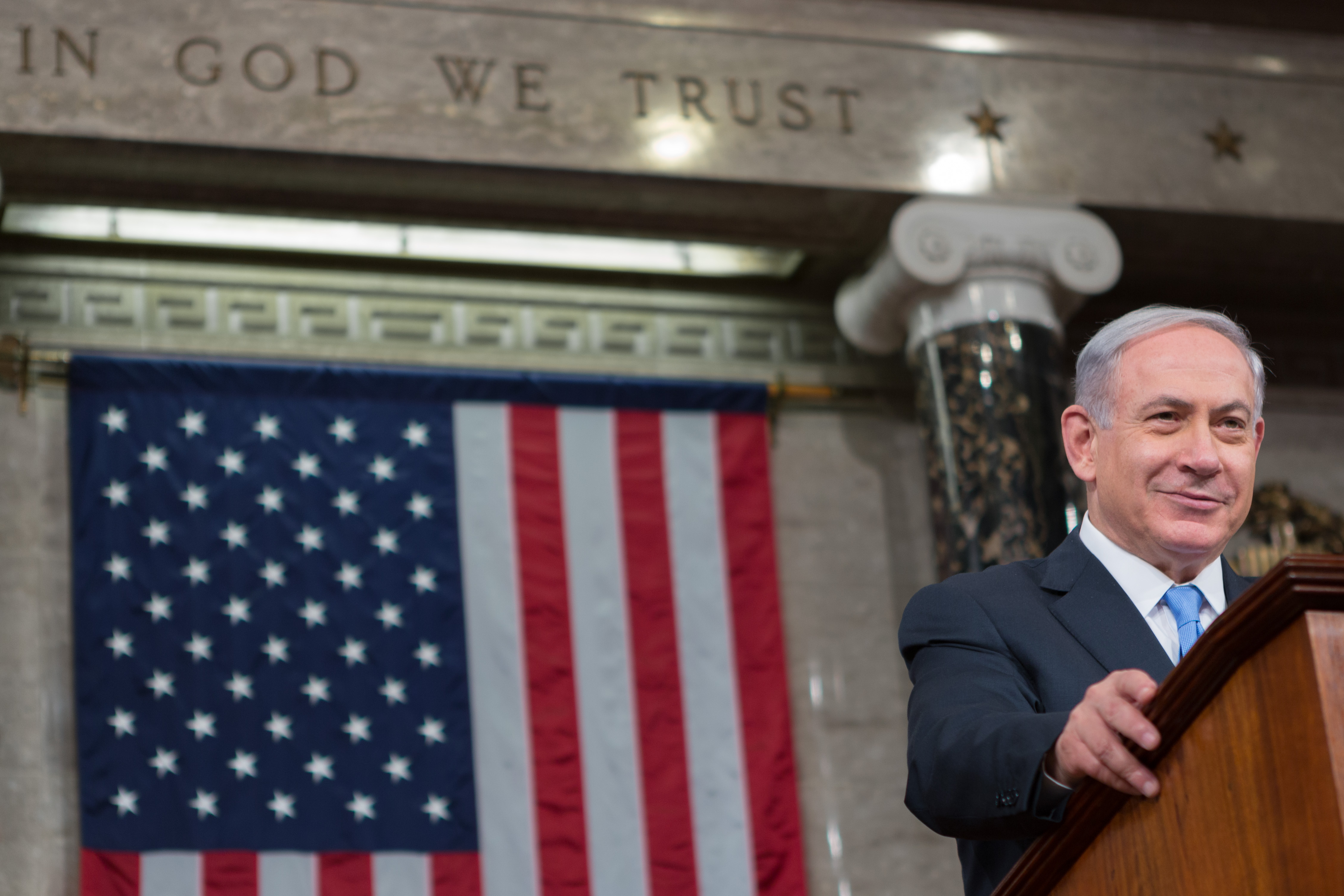
Netanyahu speaking to the United States Congress in 2015

The political positions of Benjamin Netanyahu, the Prime Minister of Israel and leader of the right-wing Likud party, have largely been described as right-wing populist and nationalist. These beliefs have been colloquially referred to as Bibism. Under Netanyahu's rule, Israel has experienced authoritarianism, democratic backsliding, corruption, and expansionism. The Israeli Military Censor had long censored thousands of news articles annually. During the Gaza war, Israel intensified protest and news censorship, including reports about the humanitarian crisis in Gaza. Netanyahu's attempts to revamp judicial systems have been accused of being efforts to elevate authoritarianism and protect him from corruption charges; he in turn accused the "leftist Deep state" of attempting to weaponize the justice system against him and Israel.

He has made populist statements regarding anti-Arab racism involving narratives of conflict with Jews, in particular of anti-Palestinianism. Netanyahu's sixth government, serving from 2022 to 2026, has moved towards far-right politics and been described as the most far-right government in Israeli history. He has allied Israel with other illiberal, authoritarian leaders from Hungary, Russia, and the US.

== Israeli–Palestinian conflict ==
Netanyahu opposed the Oslo Accords. In 1993 he argued against the Oslo peace process in his book A Place Among the Nations. He asserted incorrectly that Amin al-Husseini had been a mastermind of the Holocaust, and Yasser Arafat was heir to the former's "alleged exterminationist Nazism". During his term as prime minister in the 1990s, Netanyahu reneged on commitments made by previous Israeli governments as part of the peace process, leading peace envoy Dennis Ross to note that "neither President Clinton nor Secretary [of State Madeleine] Albright believed that Bibi had any real interest in pursuing peace." In a 2001 video, Netanyahu, reportedly unaware he was being recorded, said:

They asked me before the election if I'd honor [the Oslo Accords] […] I said I would, but ... I'm going to interpret the accords in such a way that would allow me to put an end to this galloping forward to the '67 borders. How did we do it? Nobody said what defined military zones were. Defined military zones are security zones; as far as I'm concerned, the entire Jordan Valley is a defined military zone. Go argue.

In 2009, speaking at a cabinet meeting, Netanyahu promised not to repeat the "mistake" of the Gaza pullout, adding that "the unilateral evacuation brought neither peace nor security. On the contrary". He said, "Should we achieve a turn toward peace with the more moderate partners, we will insist on the recognition of the State of Israel and the demilitarization of the future Palestinian state". In 2014, Netanyahu said:

We don't just hand over territory, close our eyes and hope for the best. We did that in Lebanon and we got thousands of rockets. We did that in Gaza, we got Hamas and 15,000 rockets. So we're not gonna just replicate that. We want to see genuine recognition of the Jewish state and rock solid security arrangements on the ground. That's the position I've held, and it's only become firmer.

Netanyahu had previously called U.S.-backed peace talks a waste of time and refused to commit to the same two-state solution as had other Israeli leaders until 2009. He made statements which advocated an "economic peace" approach, based on economic cooperation and joint effort rather than continuous contention over political and diplomatic issues. This is in line with many significant ideas from the Peace Valley plan. He raised these ideas during discussions with U.S. secretary of state Condoleezza Rice. Netanyahu said:

Right now, the peace talks are based on only one thing, only on peace talks. It makes no sense at this point to talk about the most contractible issue. It's Jerusalem or bust, or right of return or bust. That has led to failure and is likely to lead to failure again ... We must weave an economic peace alongside a political process. That means that we have to strengthen the moderate parts of the Palestinian economy by handing rapid growth in those areas, rapid economic growth that gives a stake for peace for the ordinary Palestinians."

In January 2009, Netanyahu informed Middle East envoy Tony Blair that he would continue the policy of the Israeli governments by expanding West Bank settlements, in contravention of the Road Map, but not building new ones.

Anyone who wants to thwart the establishment of a Palestinian state has to support bolstering Hamas and transferring money to Hamas. This is part of our strategy – to isolate the Palestinians in Gaza from the Palestinians in the West Bank.

— Benjamin Netanyahu, 2019

In 2013, Netanyahu denied reports that his government would agree to peace talks on the basis of the green line. In 2014 he agreed to the American framework based on the green line and said Jewish settlers must be allowed the option of staying in their settlements under Palestinian rule.

For years Netanyahu backed Qatari transfers of hundreds of millions of dollars to Gaza, in the hope it would pacify Gaza, turn Hamas into an effective counterweight to the Palestinian Authority and prevent the establishment of a Palestinian state. In 2019, Netanyahu said at a private Likud party meeting, "Anyone who wants to thwart the establishment of a Palestinian state has to support bolstering Hamas and transferring money to Hamas. This is part of our strategy – to isolate the Palestinians in Gaza from the Palestinians in the West Bank." Often, cash was delivered in suitcases by a Qatari official escorted by Israeli intelligence. Netanyahu continued backing the payments as late as September 2023. In 2025, Shin Beth started an investigation into the alleged ties between Netanyahu's advisors and Qatar.

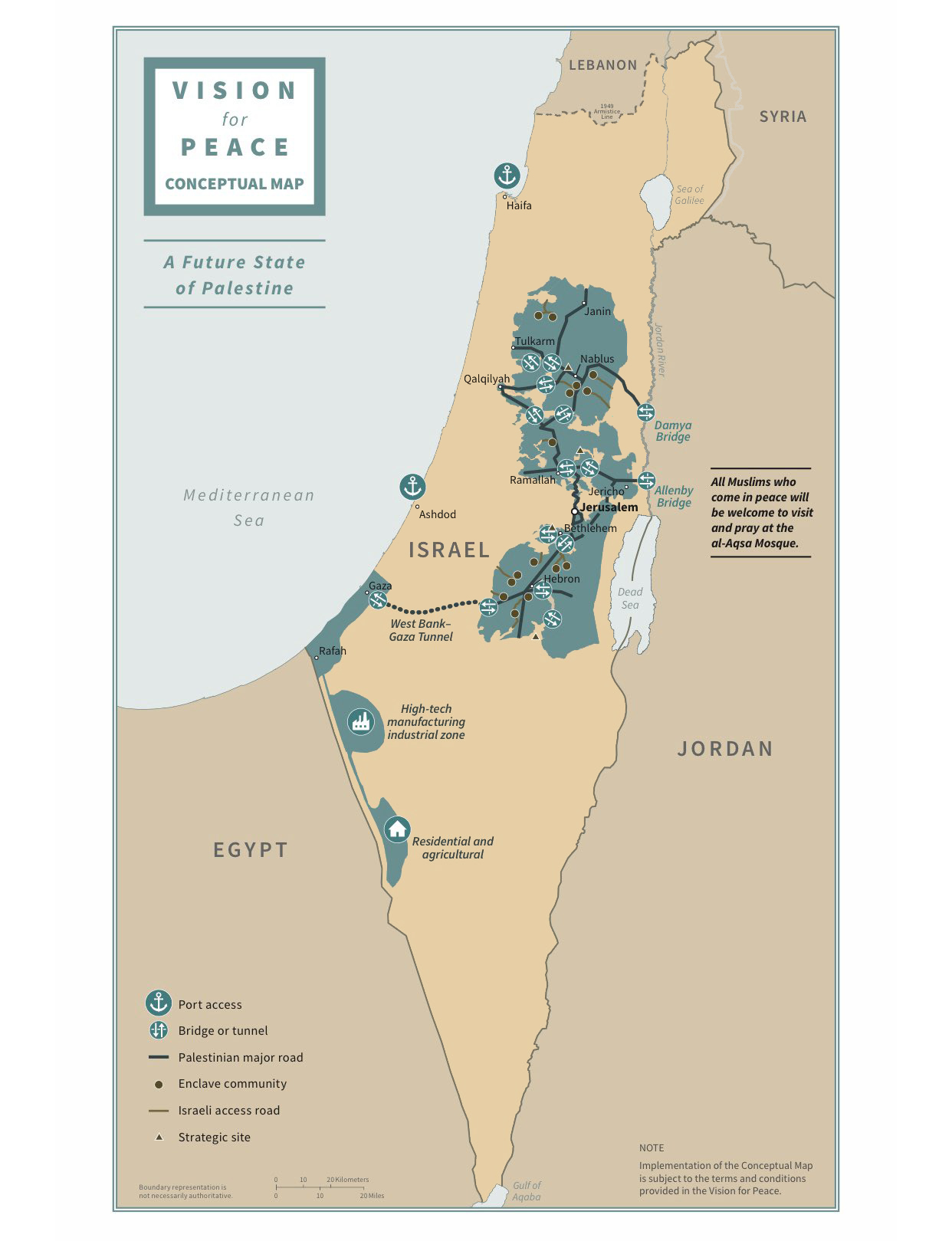
Netanyahu publicly supported the Trump peace plan for the creation of a Palestinian state.

In January 2020, Netanyahu publicly supported Trump's Israeli-Palestinian peace plan. After the proposal failed, Trump said Netanyahu "never wanted peace" with the Palestinians. Former US Secretary of State Rex Tillerson stated that in 2017, Netanyahu showed Trump a fake video of Palestinian president Abbas calling for the killing of children. This was when Trump was considering if Israel was the obstacle to peace. Netanyahu had showed Trump the video to change his position in the Israeli-Palestinian conflict.

The U.S.-brokered Abraham Accords led to normalization of relations through the Israel–United Arab Emirates normalization agreement and Bahrain–Israel normalization agreement. This was the first time an Arab country had normalized relations with Israel since Jordan in 1994. The accords were signed by Bahrain's foreign minister, UAE's foreign minister and Netanyahu in September 2020 at the White House.

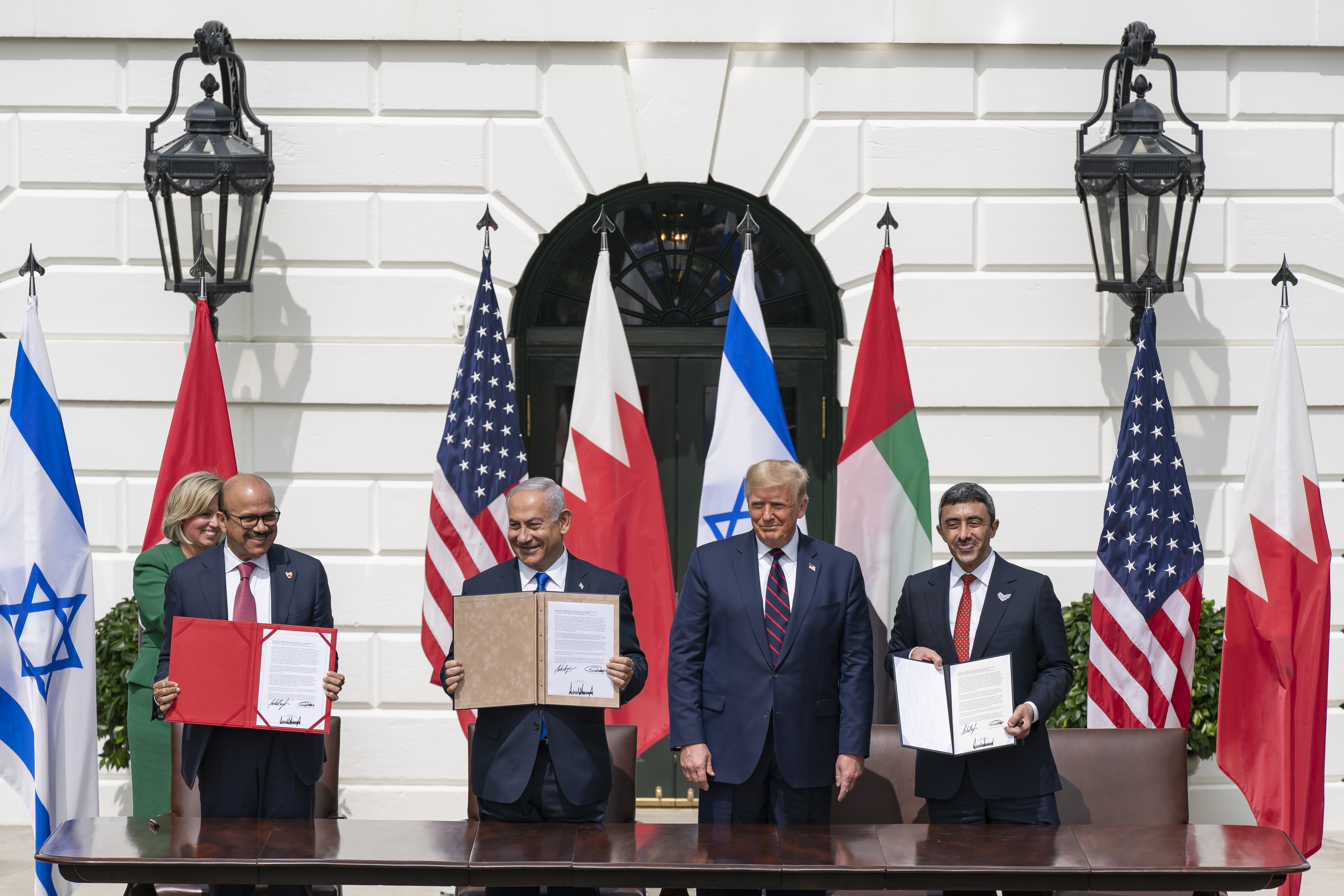
White House Abraham Accords signing ceremony on 15 September 2020

In October 2020, president Trump announced that Sudan would start to normalize ties with Israel. Sudan fought in wars against Israel in 1948 and 1967. Netanyahu thanked Trump, saying that "together with him we are changing history ... despite all the experts and commentators who said it was impossible. Israel was completely isolated and they told us we were heading into a political tsunami. What's happening is the absolute opposite." This was followed by the Israel–Morocco normalization agreement. In 2024, Pakistan officially designated him a "terrorist", calling him responsible for the atrocities in Gaza.

== Economic views ==
You want to have a meritocracy. You want to have initiative, risk, talent, the ability to create new products, new services to be rewarded ... It's always been about competition. That's what human progress is about. You want to siphon it into productive ways.

— Benjamin Netanyahu, The Marker, 2014

By 1998, Netanyahu had a reputation as a free-market advocate, and in 1999 told the Jerusalem Post: "Peace is an end of itself [...] peace, without free markets, will not produce growth. But free markets without peace do produce growth." In his first term, he significantly reformed banking, removing barriers to investment abroad, mandatory purchases of government securities and direct credit. As finance minister (2003–2005), Netanyahu introduced a welfare to work program, a program of privatization, reduced the public sector, streamlined taxation, and passed laws against monopolies and cartels to increase competition. Netanyahu extended capital gains taxes from companies to individuals, which allowed him to enlarge the tax base while reducing taxes on incomes. As the economy started booming and unemployment fell significantly, Netanyahu was widely credited by commentators as having performed an 'economic miracle'. Direct investment in the Israeli economy had increased by an annualized 380%. On the other hand, his critics have labelled his economic views as Margaret Thatcher-inspired "popular capitalism".

Netanyahu defines capitalism as "the ability to have individual initiative and competition to produce goods and services with profit, but not to shut out somebody else from trying to do the same". His views developed while he was working for Boston Consulting Group: "They wanted to do a strategic plan for the government of Sweden. I was on that case and looked at other governments. So I went around to other governments in Europe in 1976 and I was looking at Britain. I was looking at France. I was looking at other countries, and I could see that they were stymied by concentrations of power that prevented competition. And I thought, hmm, as bad as they are, ours was worse because we had very little room for private sector competition to the extent that we had government-controlled or union-controlled companies, and so you really didn't get the competition or the growth ... And I said, well, if I ever have a chance, I'll change that."

== Views on counter-terrorism ==
The essence of democratic societies, and that which distinguishes them from dictatorships, is the commitment to resolve conflict in a nonviolent fashion by settling issues through argument and debate ... The salient point that has to be underlined again and again is that nothing justifies terrorism, that it is evil per se – that the various real or imagined reasons proffered by the terrorists to justify their actions are meaningless.

— Benjamin Netanyahu, 1995

Netanyahu has said his "hard line against all terrorists" came as a result of his brother's death. Yoni Netanyahu was killed while leading the hostage-rescue mission at Operation Entebbe.

In addition to taking part in counter-terrorist operations during his military service, Netanyahu has published three books on fighting terrorism. He identifies terrorism as a form of totalitarianism, writing:

The more far removed the target of the attack from any connection to the grievance enunciated by the terrorists, the greater the terror ... Yet for terrorism to have any impact, it is precisely the lack of connection, the lack of any possible involvement or "complicity" of the chosen victims in the cause the terrorists seek to attack, that produces the desired fear. For terrorism's underlying message is that every member of society is "guilty", that anyone can be a victim, and that therefore no one is safe...the methods reveal the totalitarian strain that runs through all terrorist groups... It is not only that the ends of the terrorists do not succeed in justifying the means they choose; their choice of means indicate what their true ends are. Far from being fighters for freedom, terrorists are the forerunners of tyranny. Terrorists use the techniques of violent coercion in order to achieve a regime of violent coercion.

Netanyahu cautions that:

The trouble with active anti-terror activities... is that they do constitute a substantial intrusion on the lives of those being monitored.

He believes there is a balance between civil liberties and security, which should depend on the level of sustained terrorist attacks in a country. During periods of sustained attack, there should be shift towards security, due to "the monstrous violation of personal rights which is the lot of the victims of terror and their families". But this should be regularly reviewed, with an emphasis on guarding civil liberties and individual privacy wherever and whenever security considerations allow: "The concern of civil libertarians over possible infringements of the rights of innocent citizens is well placed, and all additional powers granted the security services should require annual renewal by the legislature, this in addition to judicial oversight of actions as they are taken in the field."

He advises tighter immigration laws as an essential to preemptively combat terrorism: "This era of immigration free-for-all should be brought to an end. An important aspect of taking control of the immigration situation is stricter background checks of potential immigrants, coupled with the real possibility of deportation."

He cautions that it is essential that governments do not conflate terrorists with those legitimate political groups that may or may not hold extremist views, but which advance their positions by means of debate and argument. Ronald Reagan was an admirer of Netanyahu's work on counter-terrorism, and Reagan recommended Netanyahu's book Terrorism: How the West Can Win to figures in his administration.

== Death penalty ==
In 2017, Netanyahu called for the death penalty to be imposed on the perpetrator of the 2017 Halamish stabbing attack. Representatives in his government introduced a bill which would allow the death penalty for terrorism. In a preliminary vote in 2018, 52 of 120 members of parliament voted in favor while 49 opposed, to make it easier for judges to hand down the death penalty. The amendment to the penal code required three more readings to become law.

On 30 March 2026, Netanyahu went to the Knesset to be physically present to vote in support of the bill approving the application of the death penalty by hanging for Palestinians in the West Bank convicted of terrorism, which passed 62-48.

== LGBT rights ==
Netanyahu supports equal rights for LGBT persons. He said: "The struggle for every person to be recognized as equal before the law is a long struggle, and there is still a long way to go ... I am proud that Israel is among the most open countries in the world in relation to the LGBT community discourse." During an event held for the annual community rights day at the Knesset, Netanyahu said that he was "asked to come here in the middle of my busy schedule to say one thing to the male and female members of the LGBT community: We must be guided by the conviction that every person is created in the image of God." However, some of his coalition government's party members opposed same-sex marriage.

== Ethiopian Jewish integration ==
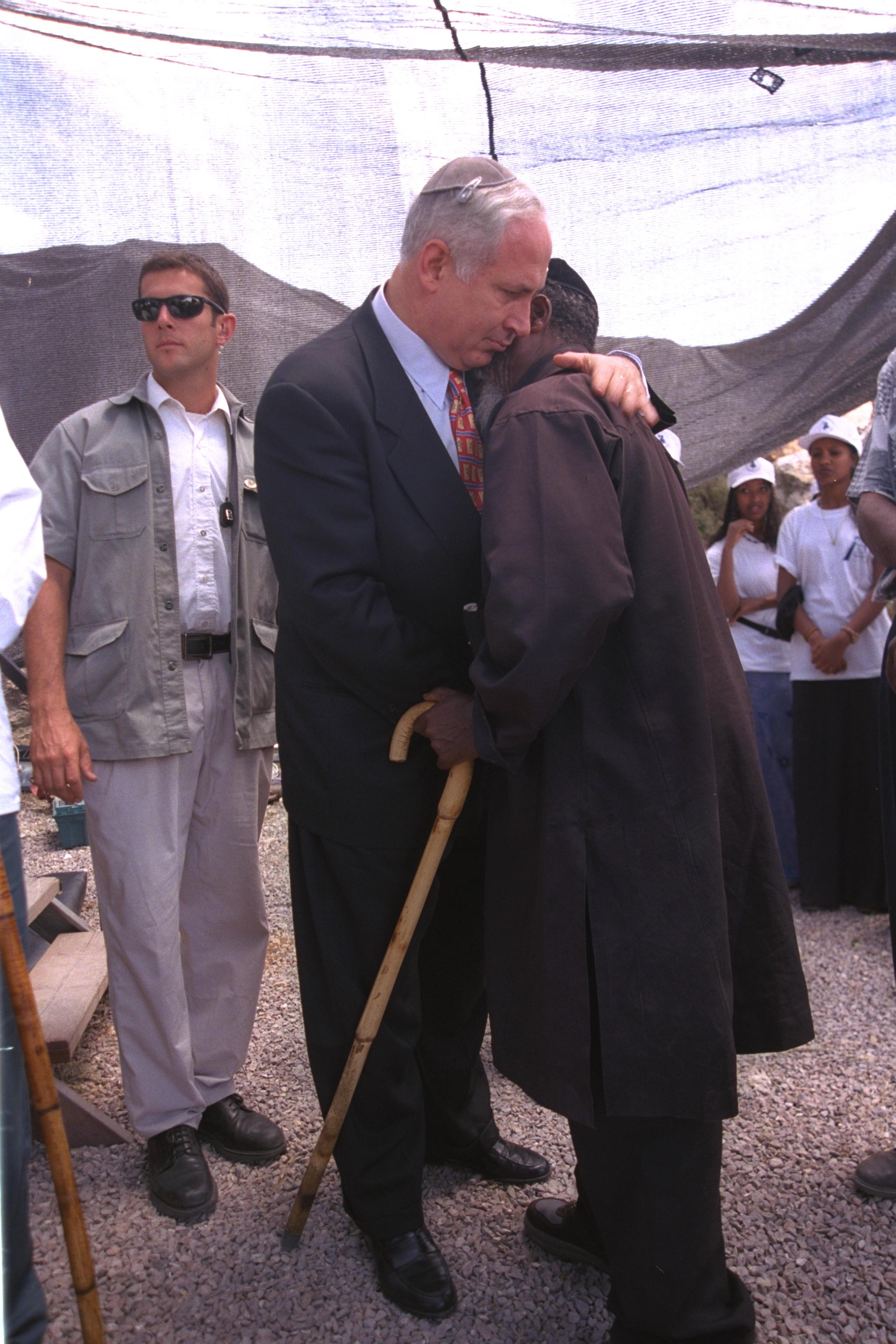
Netanyahu at a memorial service of Ethiopian Israeli immigrants, in honor of their friends who died on their way to Israel

In 2015, after Ethiopian Jewish protests against police brutality, Netanyahu said: "We will bring a comprehensive plan to the government to assist you in every way. There is no room for racism and discrimination in our society, none ... We will turn racism into something contemptible and despicable."

== African Hebrew Israelites of Jerusalem ==
Netanyahu supports the integration of the African Hebrew Israelites of Jerusalem into Israeli society, and takes part in celebrations in honor of this community's "exodus" from America to Israel, which occurred in 1967. In 2012, Netanyahu expressed appreciation towards "the cooperative society that is working towards the inclusion of the Hebrew Israelite community in Israeli society at large," and declared that the experience of the community in the land of Israel is "an integral part of the Israeli experience."

== Iran ==
In a 2007 interview, Netanyahu said "there is only one difference between Nazi Germany and the Islamic Republic of Iran, namely that the first entered a worldwide conflict and then sought atomic weapons, while the latter is first seeking atomic weapons and, once it has them, will then start a world war." Netanyahu repeated these remarks at a news conference in 2008. This was similar to earlier remarks that "it's 1938, and Iran is Germany, and Iran is racing to arm itself with atomic bombs".

According to former U.S. secretary of state John Kerry, Netanyahu had unsuccessfully urged U.S. presidents, including George W. Bush, Barack Obama, and Joe Biden, to launch a war against Iran, presenting detailed attack plans to each president, before ultimately finding a willing partner in Donald Trump.

In February 2009, after being asked to be prime minister, Netanyahu described Iran as the greatest threat Israel has ever faced: "Iran is seeking to obtain a nuclear weapon and constitutes the gravest threat to our existence since the war of independence." Speaking before the UN in New York in September 2009, Netanyahu expressed a different opinion to Iranian president Ahmadinejad's speech at the forum, saying those who believe Tehran is a threat only to Israel are wrong. "The Iranian regime", he said, "is motivated by fanaticism ... They want to see us go back to medieval times. The struggle against Iran pits civilization against barbarism. This Iranian regime is fueled by extreme fundamentalism." "By focusing solely on Iran", columnist Yossi Melman speculated that Netanyahu's foreign policy, "... took the Palestinian issue off the world agenda." After days of shelling from the Iranian-funded Palestinian Islamic Jihad, Melman asked, "Is it worth initiating a crisis with Iran? Will the Israeli public be able to cope with Iran's response?" According to Uzi Eilam, Netanyahu is using the threat of atomic Iran as a means of reaching his goals. He said: "Netanyahu is using the Iranian threat to achieve ... political objectives." He said: "These declarations are unnecessarily scaring Israel's citizens, given Israel is not party to the negotiations to determine whether Iran will or will not dismantle its nuclear program."

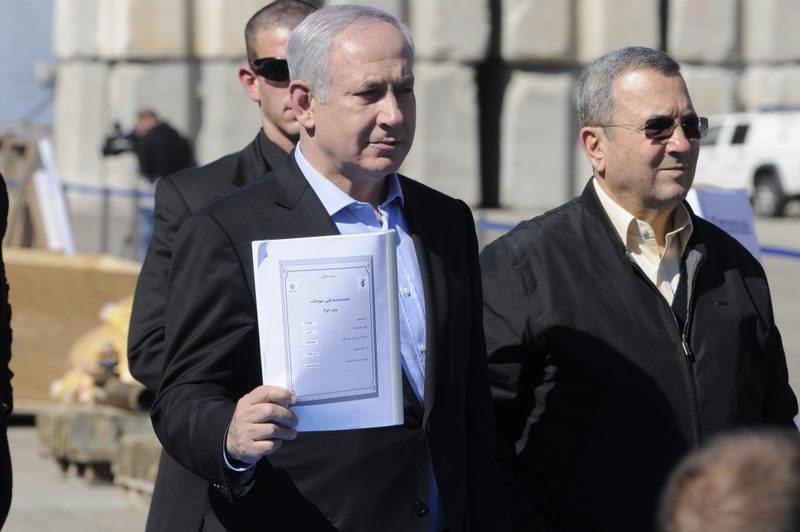
Standing with Israeli Minister of Defense Ehud Barak, Netanyahu holds an Iranian instruction manual for the anti-ship missile captured in Victoria Affair, March 2011.

By 2012, Netanyahu was reported to have formed a close, confidential relationship with Defense Minister Ehud Barak as the two considered possible military action against Iran's nuclear facilities, following Israel's established Begin Doctrine. The pair were accused of acting on "messianic" impulses by Yuval Diskin, former head of the Shin Bet, who said their warmongering rhetoric appealed to "the idiots within the Israeli public". Diskin was supported by former Mossad chief Meir Dagan, who had said an attack on Iran was "the stupidest thing I have ever heard".

Early in 2012, Netanyahu used the opening ceremony for Israel's Holocaust Remembrance Day to warn against the dangers of an Iranian nuclear bomb, saying he was following the example of Jewish leaders during World War II who struggled to raise the alarm about the Nazis' genocidal intentions. Israeli academic Avner Cohen accused Netanyahu of showing "contempt" for the Holocaust by putting it to "political use", and former Israeli foreign minister Shlomo Ben-Ami similarly condemned Netanyahu's "vulgar manipulation of the memory of the Holocaust". Immediately after the 2012 Burgas bus bombing, Netanyahu confirmed it had been undertaken in coordination with Iran.

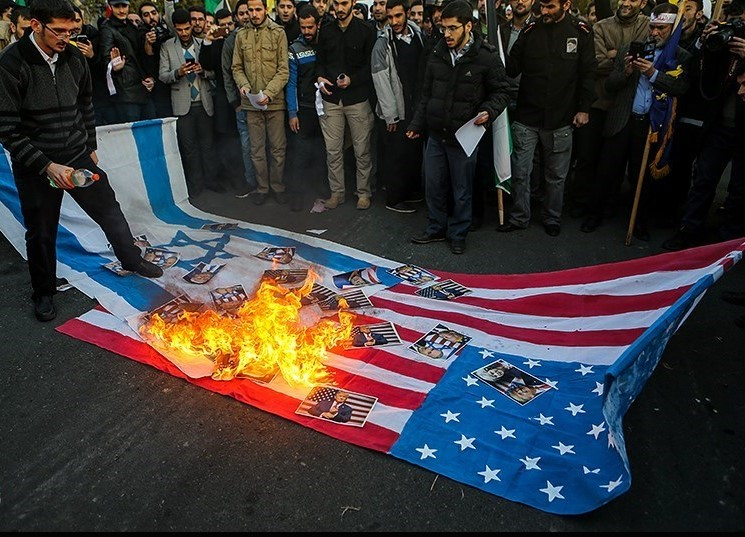
Protest against U.S. recognition of Jerusalem as capital of Israel, Tehran, 11 December 2017

Netanyahu opined during a July meeting that "all the sanctions and diplomacy so far have not set back the Iranian programme by one iota". In September 2012, Netanyahu gave a speech to the UN General Assembly in which he set forward a "red line" of 90% uranium enrichment, stating that if Iran were to reach this level, it would become an intolerable risk for Israel. Netanyahu used a cartoon graphic of a bomb to illustrate his point, indicating three stages of uranium enrichment, saying that Iran had already completed the first stage, and stating that "By next spring, at most by next summer at current enrichment rates, [Iran] will have finished the medium enrichment and move on to the final stage. From there, it's only a few months, possibly a few weeks before they get enough enriched uranium for the first bomb." At the time, according to cables leaked in 2015, Mossad's assessment was that Iran did not appear ready to enrich uranium to levels required for a nuclear bomb. In an October 2013 interview, Netanyahu praised the history of Persia and said: "If the Iranian regime has nuclear weapons, the Iranian people will never be free of dictatorship and will live in eternal servitude."

Notwithstanding his stated concern about the potential threat of an Iran that would be armed with nuclear weapons, Netanyahu is an outspoken opponent of the Iran nuclear deal, and praised the United States withdrawal from the Joint Comprehensive Plan of Action.

The U.S. 2020 Baghdad International Airport airstrike, which killed Iranian General Qasem Soleimani was praised by Netanyahu, saying Trump had acted "swiftly, forcefully and decisively".

In June 2025, Netanyahu authorized airstrikes against Iran, marking the beginning of the Twelve-Day War. Netanyahu stated the goal of the operation was to dismantle Iran's nuclear capabilities, which he described as a "clear and present danger to Israel's very survival.". In February 2026, Netanyahu authorized joint airstrikes against Iran in coordination with United States President Donald Trump, assassinating Iranian Supreme Leader Ali Khamenei and beginning the 2026 Iran war. He framed both military campaigns as opportunities for regime change in Iran, aligning with exiled Crown Prince Reza Pahlavi's call for a national uprising.

== Bank of China terror financing case ==
In 2013, Netanyahu found himself caught between conflicting commitments made to the family of American terror victim Daniel Wultz and the Chinese government. Although Netanyahu was reported to have promised U.S. Representative Ileana Ros-Lehtinen that Israel would cooperate in the terror-financing case against Bank of China in the U.S. District Court, the prime minister reportedly made a conflicting promise to China. Attorney David Boies, lead counsel for the Wultz family, told The Wall Street Journal, "While we are respectful of China's interests, and of the diplomatic pressure to which Israel has been subjected, those interests and that pressure cannot be permitted to obstruct the ability of American courts to hear critical evidence."

In August 2013, Ros-Lehtinen, chair of the House Middle East and South Asia subcommittee said she raised the issue while leading a congressional delegation to Israel, stressing to Israeli officials the importance of them providing the Wultz family what they need for their lawsuit. "I am hopeful that we can bring this case to a conclusion that is satisfactory to the family, but we need community support to not waver at this critical time," Ros-Lehtinen said.

== Defense and security ==
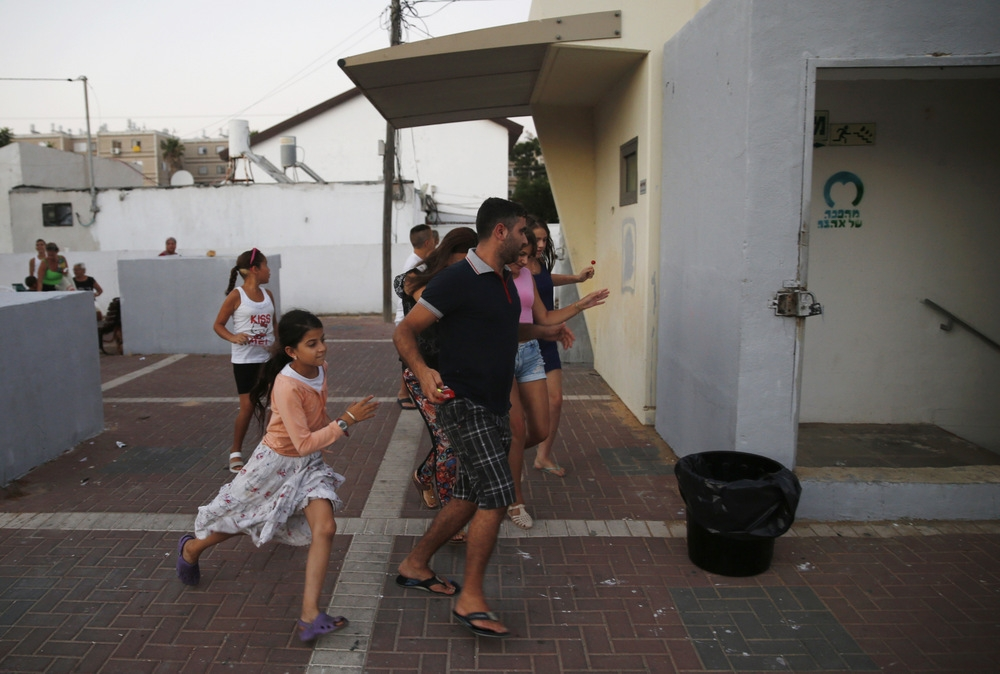
Israelis in Ashkelon run for shelter following a missile alert during Operation Protective Edge

In 2011, Netanyahu arranged for 1000 Hamas and Fatah prisoners to be swapped for Gilad Shalit, including terrorists with "blood on their hands". Israeli officials estimate that 60% of those released "resume terrorism attacks".

In 2011, Israeli General Staff concluded that the armed forces cannot maintain battle readiness under Netanyahu's proposed cuts. Netanyahu decided to cut social programs instead and promised to increase the defense budget by six percent. The Israeli military still fell NIS 3.7 million short from its projected budget, which could damage war capabilities. According to a U.S. State Department representative in 2011, under Netanyahu and Obama, Israel and the United States have enjoyed unprecedented security cooperation.

Under Netanyahu's leadership, the Israeli National Security Council has seen an expanded role in foreign policy planning and decision-making.

During the Gaza war he called for Israel to assume "overall security responsibility" over the Gaza Strip, saying "we've seen what happens when we don't have it [...] what we have is the eruption of Hamas terror on a scale that we couldn't imagine".

== Illegal immigration ==
In his 1995 book Fighting Terrorism: How Democracies Can Defeat Domestic and International Terrorism, Netanyahu argued that tightening immigration laws in the West is the most effective method to combat terrorism. "This era of immigration free-for-all should be brought to an end".

In 2012, the Netanyahu government passed the "Prevention of Infiltration Law", which mandated automatic detention of all people, including asylum-seekers, who enter Israel without permission. Amnesty International called it "an affront to international law". Between 2009 and 2013, approximately 60,000 people crossed into Israel from various African countries. Netanyahu said that "this phenomenon is very grave and threatens the social fabric of society, our national security and our national identity." Many migrants are held in detention camps in the Negev desert. When the Supreme Court of Israel declared the "Prevention of Infiltration Law" illegal for permitting immediate and indefinite detention of asylum seekers from Africa, Netanyahu requested legislation to work around the Supreme Court ruling.

Netanyahu is critical of what he sees as the overly open immigration policy of EU nations. Netanyahu has urged the leaders of Hungary, Slovakia, Czech Republic and Poland to close their borders to illegal immigration.
