= Cartismo (Paraguay) =

Political movement in Paraguay

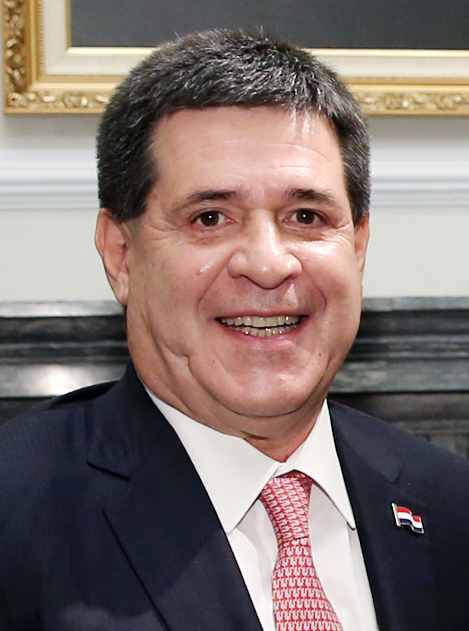
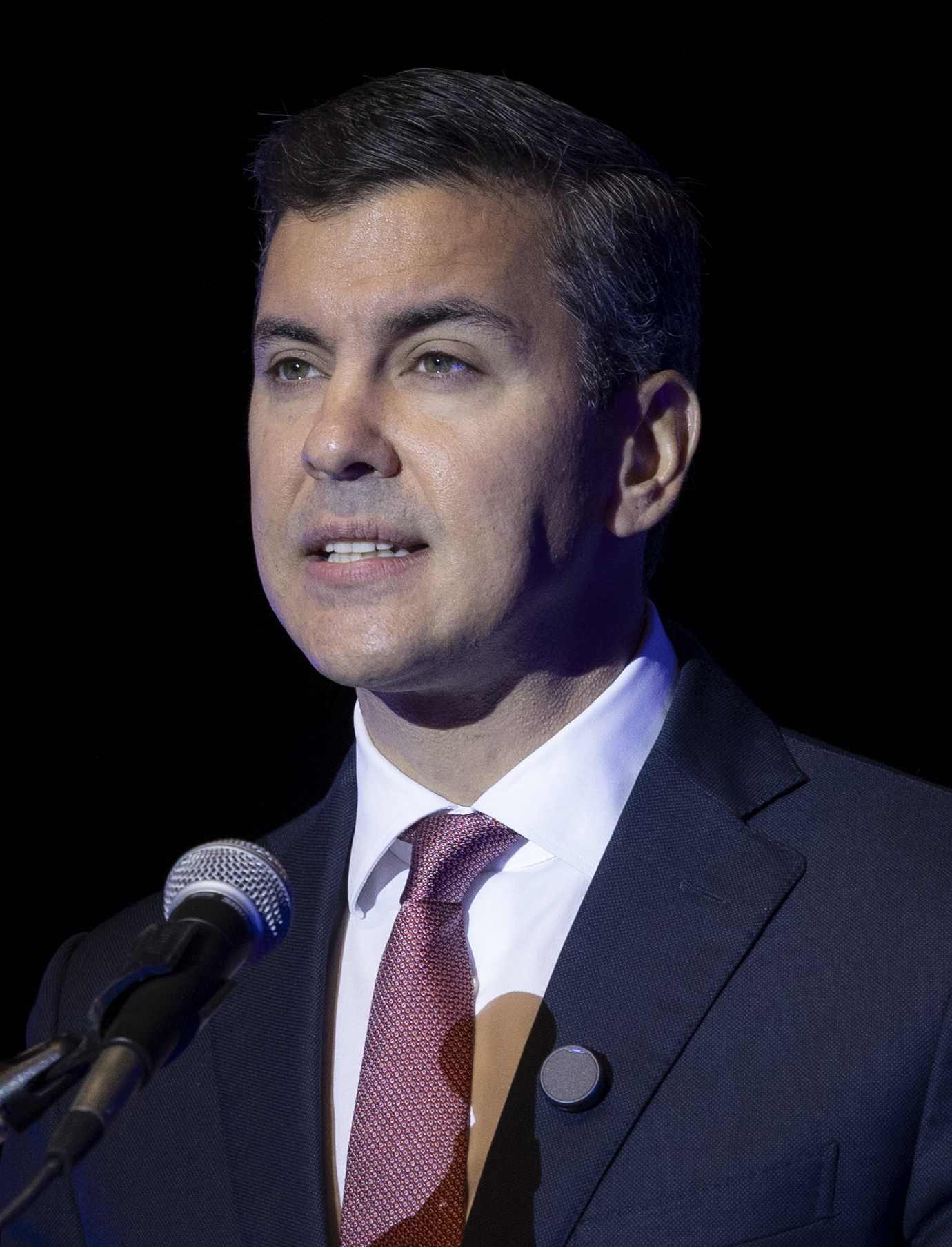
- Horacio Cartes and Santiago Peña, presidents of Paraguay who are members of the movement
- Leader: Santiago Peña; Horacio Cartes
- Founder: Horacio Cartes
- Founded: 2010; 16 years ago
- Membership: Colorado Party
- Ideology: Conservatism; Nationalism; Right-wing populism; Neoliberalism; Anti-communism
- Political position: Right-wing to far-right
- Colours: Red; White

Cartismo is a political movement in Paraguay within the Colorado Party led by Horacio Cartes, businessman and former president of Paraguay (2013–2018). Although Cartes consolidated his political leadership during his presidential term, his true influence within the party and in Paraguayan politics began to manifest and intensify after leaving the presidency. Through his economic power and strategic alliances, he managed to establish a control structure within the Colorado Party, influencing the selection of candidates and the direction of party policies.

Cartismo has been the subject of debate, both for its impact on the stability of the party and for the criticism it receives regarding the concentration of power and its relationship with business sectors. While its followers consider it a model of pragmatic and effective leadership, its detractors accuse it of having weakened Paraguayan democracy through control of institutions and financing of its network of political influence.

== Origins and consolidation ==
During his first years in office, Horacio Cartes implemented a series of economic reforms that included the liberalization of certain sectors, the improvement of infrastructure, and a series of tax reforms. These policies were instrumental in cementing political support within the Colorado Party.

Throughout his administration, Cartes pushed an electoral reform agenda that was seen as an attempt to secure his influence in future elections. In particular, reforms to party financing laws and the implementation of new technologies in electoral processes were some of the most debated aspects during his term.

Cartes's administration had repercussions on Paraguay's international relations. During his tenure, Cartes positioned Paraguay as a close ally of the United States, Israel, the Republic of China (Taiwan). and other Latin American nations, particularly on issues of trade and regional security. However, his relationship with leftist governments in the region, such as those of Venezuela and Bolivia, was tense, leading Paraguay to isolate itself from certain regional groups.

== Power and network of influence ==
Horacio Cartes, before assuming the presidency of Paraguay, was already a prominent businessman who accumulated great economic power through his participation in various sectors, including tobacco, banking, and the food industry. This economic power was a key factor in his entry and rise within the Colorado Party. Cartes' influence over the Paraguayan economy allowed him to have control over politics, using his fortune to finance campaigns and attract various sectors of the party, which allowed him to consolidate himself as a leading figure in Paraguay.

After his presidential term, Cartes' influence within the Colorado Party and Paraguayan politics did not diminish. His power increased, leading the national media to call his influence "Cartismo". The movement is characterized by the strong relationship between economic and political power, as Cartes continued to influence national politics by financing various electoral campaigns within his party.

He formed alliances with traditional caudillos of the party, such as Juan Carlos Galaverna, further consolidating his power within the party structure. These alliances facilitated the rise of candidates who shared his political vision, ensuring the permanence of his influence within Paraguayan politics even after leaving the presidency.

Cartismo has consolidated itself as a force within the Colorado Party, in which the figure of Cartes remains crucial for political decision-making, directly linking the former president's economic interests with the party's political strategies.

== Cult of personality ==
A cult of personality around Cartes was observed to have manifested after his presidential term. One example were the comments of deputy Del Pilar Medina, who in 2022 placed a poster on her seat in Congress with the image of Cartes and the phrase "Horacio forever" ("Horacio por siempre"), in addition to expressing: "Yes, I am a dog, Horacio Cartes is my owner" ("Si, yo soy perrito, Horacio Cartes es mi dueño"), which generated controversy as it was interpreted as a symbol of submission and personalization of power. Medina also referred to Cartes as "the third rebuilder of Paraguay", a phrase considered to be a vindication of the military dictatorship of Alfredo Stroessner, since Colorado Party members supporters of Stroessner describe Bernardino Caballero (founder of the Colorado Party) as the "first rebuilder of Paraguay" and Stroessner as the "second". This phenomenon was also reflected in the creation of personalist support groups, such as those described in 2015 by Gustavo García in ABC Color, which promoted the defence of Cartismo and the repression of criticism of the former president.

Furthermore, it was noted that Cartes engaged in acts, such as a massive reception of civil servants and supporters of the Colorado Party on his birthday in 2016 that, according to ABC Color, evoked Stroessner's practices during his dictatorship, who received followers every November 3, his birthday. According to ABC Color, like Stroessner, Cartes presented himself as an "untouchable leader" ("líder intocable") receiving greetings from public officials, some of whom asked permission from their jobs to attend the event, and a large number of supporters who crowded to congratulate him at the headquarters of the Colorado Party.

== Controversies and criticisms ==
Cartismo has been subject to criticism, especially for its use of presidential power to control key institutions, such as the judiciary, which has been accused of fomenting authoritarian tendencies. This concentration of power has been viewed as a challenge to democracy and the separation of powers in Paraguay. Cartismo's relationship with the business sectors has also generated controversy, with some critics arguing that it favored economic interests to the detriment of social needs.

This phenomenon has been the subject of debate, as some observers interpret it as a form of political cronyism where economic power continues to strongly influence politics.

Cartes has been described as the "éminence grise" of Paraguayan politics due to his influence on decision-making, even when he does not hold official positions. His power remains key in the party's strategies and in the country's politics. In this context, some critics have viewed Santiago Peña, president of Paraguay since 2023, as a "puppet" of Cartes, suggesting that, although Peña occupies the presidency, Cartes' influence continues to set the course of the administration, especially in strategic and power issues within the Colorado Party. (Note: According to multiple sources:)

== Bibliography ==
- Kohl, Benjamin (2015). Paraguay: Political Parties, Clientelism, and Corruption. Vol. 57. Latin American Politics and Society.
- Britez, José María (2017). El Cartismo y su influencia en la política paraguaya. Universidad Nacional de Asunción. Revista de Ciencias Sociales.
- Cáceres, Carlos (2019). La política de Cartes: autoritarismo, clientelismo y poder económico. Editorial Hispana.
- Velázquez, Juan (2021). El Cartismo y su herencia en la política del Partido Colorado. Universidad Católica "Nuestra Señora de la Asunción". Revista Paraguaya de Política.
