= Giorgidi Aggabao =

Filipino lawyer and politician (born 1954)

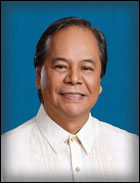
- Official portrait, 2013

Deputy Speaker of the House of Representatives of the Philippines
- In office July 22, 2013 – June 30, 2016
- Speaker: Feliciano Belmonte Jr.

Member of Philippine House of Representatives for Isabela's 4th district
- In office June 30, 2007 – June 30, 2016
- Preceded by: Anthony Miranda
- Succeeded by: Ma. Lourdes Aggabao
- In office May 19, 2003 – June 30, 2004
- Preceded by: Antonio Abaya
- Succeeded by: Anthony Miranda
House positions
Chair of the House Committee on Revision of Laws
In office February 6, 2019 – June 30, 2010
Preceded by	Orlando Fua Jr.
Succeeded by	Marlyn Primicias-Agabas

Member of Isabela Provincial Board from the 4th district
- In office June 30, 1998 – May 19, 2003
- In office June 30, 1992 – June 30, 1995

Personal details
- Born: February 24, 1954 (age 72) Santiago, Isabela, Philippines
- Party: NPC (2003–present)
- Spouse: Ma. Lourdes Rivilla
- Children: 6
- Education: De La Salle University (AB, BS); Ateneo de Manila University (LLB)
- Nickname: Gigi

Giorgidi "Gigi" Buza Aggabao (born February 24, 1954) is a Filipino lawyer, certified public accountant, politician who served as the representative for Isabela's 4th congressional district in the Philippine House of Representatives from 2003 to 2004 and 2007 to 2016, and concurrently as House deputy speaker from 2013 to 2016. A member of Nationalist People's Coalition, he previously served as a member of the Isabela Provincial Board from 1992 to 1995 and 1998 to 2003.

== Early life and education ==
Giorgidi Buza Aggabao was born on February 24, 1954, in Santiago, Isabela, to Vicente Bangilan Aggabao, a retired municipal trial court judge, and Juana Carreon Buza, a retired public school principal. He attended La Salle High School in Santiago for his primary and secondary education, graduating in 1966 with third honors. Aggabao later studied at De La Salle University from 1970 to 1975, where he finished with a degree in liberal arts, majoring in political science, and a Bachelor of Science in commerce, majoring in accounting. Aggabao pursued legal studies at Ateneo de Manila University, where he earned his Bachelor of Laws degree in 1980 as a Betty Pinera Scholar and placed tenth in the 1980 Bar Examination.

== Early career ==
While studying law, Aggabao worked as a research and development technical assistant at Group Developers Incorporated in Manila from 1976 to 1979. He later became an associate lawyer at Siguion-Reyna, Montecillo & Ongsiako Law Offices from 1981 to 1989.

Aggabao also served as an educator, working as a professorial lecturer at the De La Salle University Manila College of Commerce from 1987 to 1988 and as a reviewer in commercial law at the Far Eastern University College of Law from 1989 to 1992.

== Isabela Provincial Board (1992–1995, 1998–2001) ==
In 1992, Aggabao was elected a senior provincial board member of the Isabela Provincial Board, serving until 1995, and was re-elected in 1998 and in 2001.

== House of Representatives (2003–2004, 2007–2016) ==
=== 2003 special election ===
On February 26, 2003, Representative Antonio Abaya of Isabela's 4th congressional district died of brain cancer, leaving his congressional seat vacant. A special election was called by the Commission on Elections (COMELEC) on May 12, 2003, as announced by the House, with Aggabao running under the Nationalist People's Coalition against Antonio Abaya's widow, Asuncion Abaya, a candidate of Lakas–NUCD–UMDP. His campaign was backed by provincial governor Faustino Dy Jr. and mayors of other municipalities apart from Santiago, which was expected to deliver votes for Abaya.

Unofficial counts on election day reported that the municipalities of Echague, Cordon and Ramon were won by Aggabao, and Santiago by Abaya, with Aggabao leading by a large overall margin. He was declared the winner by the COMELEC on May 14, 2003, but Abaya's lawyers contested the results during the canvassing of votes, walking out and alleging that ballot boxes had been switched between polling precincts and the canvassing headquarters in Ilagan. With the Abaya camp holding a separate canvass, the official results showed that Aggabao had won in the towns of Cordon, San Isidro, Jones, San Agustin, Ramon and Echague, while Abaya won in Santiago by a margin of 5,000 votes and in Dinapigue by only 62 votes. The tally by the election watchdog Parish Pastoral Council for Responsible Voting and Abaya's camp had Abaya winning with 46,072 votes over Aggabao's total of 41,103 votes. Aggabao dismissed the accusations, saying that he did not complain when he was defeated in the 1991 and 2001 elections.

Aggabao was sworn in as representative by Governor Dy after being proclaimed, assuming office on May 19, 2003, as a member of the 12th Congress.

=== First term (2003–2004) ===
During his brief first term as representative, Aggabao principally authored six national and local bills and co-authored 38 others.

=== Re-election bid (2004) ===
Aggabao ran for re-election to a full term in 2004, but was beaten by Anthony Miranda, the brother of Santiago mayor Jose Miranda. He filed an electoral protest before the Supreme Court in Aggabao v. Commission on Elections, arguing that the COMELEC en banc had acted without jurisdiction in ordering Miranda's proclamation while its Second Division had not yet resolved Aggabao's appeal to prevent the proclamation on the grounds of irregular canvassing of votes. The petition was dismissed for lack of merit.

=== Second term (2007–2010) ===
Aggabao was elected representative for Isabela's 4th district in the 2007 elections. During the 14th Congress, he served as chairperson of the House Committee on Revision of Laws.

=== Third term (2010–2013) ===
In 2010, Aggabao was re-elected to a second successive term, winning with 83,412 votes and defeating Danilo Tan, who received 78,228 votes.

In December 2011, Aggabao voted in favor of the impeachment of Chief Justice Renato Corona. He was later elected as one of the ten members of the House prosecution panel and presented Article III before the impeachment court, which concerned culpable violation of the Constitution and betrayal of public trust.

During the 15th Congress, Aggabao served as vice chairman of the committees on Legislative Franchises, Public Works and Highways, and Ways and Means, and as a member of five other committees as part of the majority bloc.

=== Fourth term (2013–2016) ===
Aggabao defended his seat in 2013, winning with 105,139 votes against former representative Anthony Miranda, who received 31,361 votes, and Danilo Tan, who received 6,491 votes. At the opening of the 16th Congress, he was elected as one of the six deputy speakers under Speaker Feliciano Belmonte Jr.

In July 2013, Aggabao issued a statement dismissing China's threat of a counterstrike against the Philippines as "saber rattling." He made the statement in response to Chinese state media reports warning of an inevitable counterstrike should the Philippines continue to provoke Beijing in the West Philippine Sea, over which both countries have competing territorial claims.

As president of the Nationalist People's Coalition, Aggabao endorsed Grace Poe's presidential bid in the 2016 elections.

=== Committee membership ===
==== 16th Congress ====
- Ex-officio member of all standing committees as deputy speaker

==== 15th Congress ====
- Committee on Legislative Franchises (Vice Chair)
- Committee on Public Works and Highways (Vice Chair)
- Committee on Ways and Means (Vice Chair)
- Committee on Accounts
- Committee on Foreign Affairs
- Committee on Games and Amusements
- Committee on Revision of Laws
- Committee on Suffrage and Electoral Reforms

==== 14th Congress ====
- Committee on Revision of Laws (Chair)

== Post-congressional career (2016–present) ==
In 2016, Aggabao was term-limited and briefly retired from public office, with his wife, Ma. Lourdes, winning his seat. He attempted twice to make a comeback in Congress: in 2019, when he lost to Alyssa Sheena Tan of Partido Federal ng Pilipinas, and in 2025, when he lost to incumbent Joseph Tan of Lakas–CMD.

== Personal life ==
Aggabao is married to former representative Ma. Lourdes Cojuangco Rivilla, with whom he has six children. He is professionally affiliated with the Philippine Institute of Certified Public Accountants, the Philippine Bar Association, the Legal Management Council of the Philippines, where he served as a board member, and the Amateur Boxing Association of the Philippines.

== Electoral history ==
Electoral history of Giorgidi Aggabao
Year	Office	Party	Votes received				Result
Year	Office	Party	Total	%	P.	Swing	Result
1992	Board Member (Isabela–4th)	Unknown	—N/a	—N/a	—N/a	—N/a	Won
1998	Board Member (Isabela–4th)	Unknown	—N/a	—N/a	—N/a	—N/a	Won
2001	Board Member (Isabela–4th)	Unknown	—N/a	—N/a	—N/a	—N/a	Won
2003	Representative (Isabela–4th)	NPC	53,444	56.00%	1st	—N/a	Won
2004	Representative (Isabela–4th)	NPC	—N/a	—N/a	2nd	—N/a	Lost
2007	Representative (Isabela–4th)	NPC	—N/a	—N/a	1st	—N/a	Won
2010	Representative (Isabela–4th)	NPC	83,412	50.94%	1st	—N/a	Won
2013	Representative (Isabela–4th)	NPC	105,139	64.85%	1st	+13.91	Won
2019	Representative (Isabela–4th)	NPC	—N/a	—N/a	2nd	—N/a	Lost
2025	Representative (Isabela–4th)	NPC	39,908	25.92%	2nd	—N/a	Lost

House of Representatives of the Philippines
Preceded by Anthony Miranda	Member of the Philippine House of Representatives for Isabela's 4th congressional district 2007–2016	Succeeded by Ma. Lourdes Aggabao
Preceded by Antonio Abaya	Member of the Philippine House of Representatives for Isabela's 4th congressional district 2003–2004	Succeeded by Anthony Miranda
