= 2003 Isabela's 4th congressional district special election =

2003 special election at Isabela's 4th congressional district
- May 12, 2003

Isabela's 4th congressional district
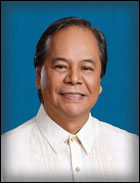

Candidate	Giorgidi Aggabao	Asuncion Abaya
Party	NPC	Lakas
Popular vote	53,444	41,996
Percentage	56.00	44.00
Representative before election
Antonio Abaya
Lakas
Representative-elect
Giorgidi Aggabao
NPC

A special election for Isabela's 4th district seat in the House of Representatives of the Philippines was held on May 12, 2003, to fill the district's vacant seat for the remainder of the 12th Congress. The vacancy arose when Antonio Abaya died on February 26, 2003. Giorgidi Aggabao won the special election, beating Abaya's widow Asuncion, to succeed him in the House of Representatives and serve out the remainder of his term that ended in 2004.

== Electoral system ==
The House of Representatives is elected via parallel voting system, with 80% of seats elected from congressional districts, and 20% from the party-list system. Each district sends one representative to the House of Representatives. An election to the seat is via first-past-the-post, in which the candidate with the most votes, whether or not one has a majority, wins the seat.

Based on Republic Act (RA) No. 6645, in order for a special election to take place, the seat must be vacated, the relevant chamber notifies the Commission on Elections (COMELEC) the existence of a vacancy, then the COMELEC schedules the special election. There is a dispute in the procedure as a subsequent law, RA No. 7166, supposedly amended the procedure, bypassing the need for official communication from the relevant chamber of the vacancy. The COMELEC has always waited on official communication from the relevant chamber before scheduling a special election.

Meanwhile, according to RA No. 8295, should only one candidate file to run in the special election, the COMELEC will declare that candidate as the winner and will no longer hold the election.

== District profile ==
Isabela's 4th congressional district covers the southern part of the province, consisting of the city of Santiago and the municipalities of Cordon, Dinapigue, Echague, Jones, Ramon, San Agustin, and San Isidro. Since its creation in 1987, the district has been represented by Antonio Abaya, except from 1998 to 2001 when Heherson Alvarez held the seat.

== Campaign ==
Representative Antonio Abaya, who had represented the Isabela's 4th legislative district from 1987 to 1998 and since 2001, died on February 26, 2003. Abaya, who was term-limited in 1998, ran for mayor of Santiago but was defeated. He ran again for the seat (that includes Santiago) in 2001 and won.

As the Isabela Provincial Board passed the resolution urging the special election to be held, three people had been brought up as potential candidates. However, only Santiago mayor Jose Miranda (PDP–Laban) had declared his intention to run, relying on the support of Santiago and three other towns. Other potential candidates were former board member Giorgidi Aggabao, who had been beaten by Abaya in 2001 and was backed by Isabela governor Faustino Dy Jr., and Asuncion Abaya, the late representative's widow, who is a medical doctor.

Later on, Miranda withdrew in favor of Dr. Abaya, who was considered to be the "sentimental favorite". Miranda's city of Santiago, the largest of the seven local government units in the district with about 60,000 votes, was expected to be the strongest source of votes for her. The mayors of the other towns all supported Aggabao, along with the Dy clan headed by the provincial governor.

== Candidates ==
1. Asuncion Abaya (Lakas), medical doctor and widow of erstwhile incumbent Antonio Abaya
2. Giorgidi Aggabao (NPC), former Isabela Provincial Board member from the 4th district

== Result ==
2003 Isabela's 4th congressional district special election
Candidate	Party	Votes	%
Giorgidi Aggabao	Nationalist People's Coalition	53,444	56.00
Asuncion Abaya	Lakas–NUCD–UMDP	41,996	44.00
Total		95,440	100.00
Majority		11,448	17.2
Nationalist People's Coalition gain from Lakas–NUCD–UMDP			

On election day, people handling Miranda's security were shot by unidentified men riding in motorcycles. The incident was described by the city election officer as "election-related." Other disturbances included the confrontation of Cordon Mayor Amado Vallejo, Jr. of two lawyers of the Abaya campaign who allegedly harassed poll watchers. According to unofficial counts, the towns of Echague, Cordon and Ramon all went to Aggabao, while Santiago went for Abaya, with Aggabao possessing a large overall margin.

On May 14, 2003, Aggabao was declared winner by the Commission on Elections (COMELEC). While the votes were being canvassed, Abaya's lawyers protested the process by walking out of the canvassing room. They alleged that some ballot boxes were switched on the trip from the polling places to the provincial capital of Ilagan. The Abayas held their own canvassing at the People's Coliseum in Santiago, with Edwin Uy, the 2nd district representative, attending. The official results had Aggabao winning at Cordon, San Isidro, Jones, San Agustin, Ramon and Echague. Abaya won at Santiago by around 5,000 votes and at Dinapigue by 62 votes. Aggabao was sworn into office by Governor Dy right after his proclamation. The tally of the Parish Pastoral Council for Responsible Voting (PPCRV), a COMELEC-accredited watchdog, and Abaya's camp had Abaya winning by 4,969 votes. Abaya had 46,072 votes while Aggabao had 41,103 votes. Aggabao brushed off the accusations, saying that he did not raise a fuss when he was beaten in 1991 and 2001.

== Aftermath ==
Sergio Utleg, bishop of Ilagan, later issued a pastoral letter alleging the special election was the province's "most fraudulent". The pastoral letter was condemned by the isabela Provincial Board to the "strongest terms" and demanded that the bishop reconsider it. The bishop said, "My pastoral letter, contrary to the claim of the provincial board members, was based on verified facts and testimonies of people involved in the special elections," and reiterated for the nullification of the election results. Election officers of San Isidro and San Agustin claimed that Abaya won in their towns, with San Isidro's vote count for Aggabao surpassing the number of votes cast. COMELEC Chairmen Benjamin Abalos had formed a task force to investigate the alleged irregularities of the vote.

Miranda's brother Anthony won in 2004. Aggabao won anew in 2007, and by in 2013, was in his third term in Congress, successfully defending the seat on the 2010 and 2013 election. Term-limited in 2016, his wife ran and won, defending the seat. Isabela was redistricted in time for the 2019 election, and Aggabao himself was defeated by newcomer Alyssa Sheena Tan.
