= Cordon =

Cordon or Cordón may refer to:

== Basic meanings ==
- Cordon, a cord or braid used as a fastening or ornament
- Cordon (plant), the descriptive term for a particular style of pruning woody plants
- a strip of clay added around the outside of a pot in ceramic technology
- Cordon sanitaire, a line to isolate an area, event or person
- Cordon and search, a military operation
- Kettling, the use of cordons of police to contain a crowd

== Geography ==
- Cordon (Arran), a village on the Isle of Arran
- Cordón, a neighbourhood (barrio) of Montevideo, Uruguay
- Cordon, Haute-Savoie, a commune in France
- Cordon, Isabela, a municipality in the Philippines

== People ==
- Betty Cordon (1923–2012), American socialite
- Bonnie H. Cordon (born 1964), American Mormon official
- David Cordón, Spanish footballer
- Françoise Cordon (1650s–1716), French actress
- Franz von Cordon (1796–1869), Austrian general and politician
- Guy Cordon (1890–1968), American politician
- Julio Hernández Cordón, American documentary filmmaker
- Kevin Cordón (born 1986), Guatemalan badminton player
- Lucien Cordon (1899–1978), French footballer
- Oscar Cordon (born 1993), Canadian footballer
- Paul de Cordon (1908–1998), French photographer
- Pilar Lucrecia Cordón, Spanish equestrian
- Scott Cordon, British field hockey player

== Other uses ==
- Casa del Cordón, Vitoria-Gasteiz, Basque Country, Spain
- Cordón Industrial, a Chilean organ of popular power, direct or workers democracy
- Slips cordon, a formation of slip fielders in cricket
- The Cordon, 2003 Yugoslavian film
- Cordon (TV series), 2014 Belgian TV series

== See also ==
- Cordon Bleu (disambiguation)
- Coridon (disambiguation)
