= Kordon =

Kordon may refer to:

== Geographic locations ==
- Kordon, İzmir, a street and promenade in the Alsancak quarter of İzmir, Turkey
- Kordon, Poland, a village in Gmina Narewka of Hajnówka County of Podlaskie Voivodeship, Poland
- Kordon, Russia, several rural localities in Russia

== People ==
- Andrian Kordon (born 1977), Israeli judoka

== Other uses ==
- The Cordon (Serbo-Croatian: Kordon), a 2002 Serbian film

== See also ==
- Cordon (disambiguation)
