= Kordon, Russia =

Kordon (Russian: Кордо́н) is the name of several rural localities in Russia:

- Kordon, Altai Krai, a selo in Kordonsky Selsoviet of Zalesovsky District of Altai Krai
- Kordon, Republic of Kalmykia, a settlement in Kevyudovskaya Rural Administration of Iki-Burulsky District of the Republic of Kalmykia
- Kordon, Kirov Oblast, a village in Shvetsovsky Rural Okrug of Kumyonsky District of Kirov Oblast
- Kordon, Kochenyovsky District, Novosibirsk Oblast, a settlement in Kochenyovsky District, Novosibirsk Oblast
- Kordon (Chuvashinsky Rural Settlement), Severny District, Novosibirsk Oblast, a settlement in Severny District, Novosibirsk Oblast; municipally, a part of Chuvashinsky Rural Settlement of that district
- Kordon (Biazinsky Rural Settlement), Severny District, Novosibirsk Oblast, a settlement in Severny District, Novosibirsk Oblast; municipally, a part of Biazinsky Rural Settlement of that district
- Kordon, Krasnokamsk, Perm Krai, a village under the administrative jurisdiction of the city of krai significance of Krasnokamsk, Perm Krai
- Kordon, Kishertsky District, Perm Krai, a settlement in Kishertsky District, Perm Krai
- Kordon, Kosinsky District, Perm Krai, a settlement in Kosinsky District, Perm Krai
- Kordon, Samara Oblast, a selo in Khvorostyansky District of Samara Oblast
- Kordon, Sverdlovsk Oblast, a settlement under the administrative jurisdiction of the town of Serov, Sverdlovsk Oblast
- Kordon, Andreapolsky District, Tver Oblast, a khutor in Andreapolsky District of Tver Oblast
- Kordon, Kalininsky District, Tver Oblast, an inhabited locality in Kalininsky District of Tver Oblast
- Kordon, Tyumen Oblast, a settlement in Pervomaysky Rural Okrug of Vagaysky District of Tyumen Oblast
- Kordon, Vologda Oblast, a settlement in Idsky Selsoviet of Gryazovetsky District of Vologda Oblast
