= Military frontier =

Military frontier is a generic geographical term for:

- any buffer zone or
- cordon sanitaire (disambiguation) (in the broad sense of the term)
- an area subject to military occupation as a precursor to annexation
- Military Frontier, a specific region along the southern borders of the Austro-Hungarian Empire

== See also ==
- Neutral zone (disambiguation)
- Demilitarized zone
