= Isabela's 4th congressional district =

Legislative district of the Philippines

- Constituency for the House of Representatives of the Philippines
- Boundary of Isabela's 4th congressional district in Isabela

- Location of Isabela within the Philippines
- Province: Isabela
- Region: Cagayan Valley
- Population: 268,602 (2020)
- Electorate: 192,229 (2022)
- Major settlements: 5 LGUs: City; Santiago; Municipalities; Cordon; Dinapigue; Jones; San Agustin
- Area: 1,922.44 km^{2} (742.26 sq mi)

Current constituency
- Created: 1987
- Representative: Joseph S. Tan
- Political party: PFP
- Congressional bloc: Majority

Isabela's 4th congressional district is one of the six congressional districts of the Philippines in the province of Isabela. It has been represented in the House of Representatives of the Philippines since 1987. The district consists of the independent component city of Santiago and the municipalities of Cordon, Dinapigue, Jones, and San Agustin. It is currently represented in the 20th Congress by Joseph S. Tan of the Partido Federal ng Pilipinas (PFP).

Prior to its redistricting effective 2019, which increased the province's districts to six, it consisted of the city of Santiago and the municipalities of Cordon, Dinapigue, Echague, Jones, Ramon, San Agustin, and San Isidro.

== Representation history ==
#	Image	Member	Term of office		Congress	Party	Electoral history	Constituent LGUs
#	Image	Member	Start	End	Congress	Party	Electoral history	Constituent LGUs
District created February 2, 1987 from Isabela's at-large district.
1		Antonio M. Abaya	June 30, 1987	June 30, 1998	8th	KBL	Elected in 1987.	1987–2019: Cordon, Dinapigue, Echague, Jones, Ramon, San Agustin, San Isidro, Santiago
1		Antonio M. Abaya	June 30, 1987	June 30, 1998	9th	NPC	Re-elected in 1992.	1987–2019: Cordon, Dinapigue, Echague, Jones, Ramon, San Agustin, San Isidro, Santiago
1		Antonio M. Abaya	June 30, 1987	June 30, 1998	10th	Lakas	Re-elected in 1995.	1987–2019: Cordon, Dinapigue, Echague, Jones, Ramon, San Agustin, San Isidro, Santiago
2		Heherson Alvarez	June 30, 1998	June 30, 2001	11th	Lakas	Elected in 1998.	1987–2019: Cordon, Dinapigue, Echague, Jones, Ramon, San Agustin, San Isidro, Santiago
(1)		Antonio M. Abaya	June 30, 2001	February 26, 2003	12th	Lakas	Elected in 2001. Died in office.	1987–2019: Cordon, Dinapigue, Echague, Jones, Ramon, San Agustin, San Isidro, Santiago
-	vacant		February 26, 2003	May 19, 2003				1987–2019: Cordon, Dinapigue, Echague, Jones, Ramon, San Agustin, San Isidro, Santiago
3		Giorgidi Aggabao	May 19, 2003	June 30, 2004	12th	NPC	Elected to finish Abaya's term.	1987–2019: Cordon, Dinapigue, Echague, Jones, Ramon, San Agustin, San Isidro, Santiago
4		Anthony Miranda	June 30, 2004	June 30, 2007	13th	KAMPI	Elected in 2004.	1987–2019: Cordon, Dinapigue, Echague, Jones, Ramon, San Agustin, San Isidro, Santiago
(3)		Giorgidi Aggabao	June 30, 2007	June 30, 2016	14th	NPC	Elected in 2007.	1987–2019: Cordon, Dinapigue, Echague, Jones, Ramon, San Agustin, San Isidro, Santiago
(3)		Giorgidi Aggabao	June 30, 2007	June 30, 2016	15th	NPC	Re-elected in 2010.	1987–2019: Cordon, Dinapigue, Echague, Jones, Ramon, San Agustin, San Isidro, Santiago
(3)		Giorgidi Aggabao	June 30, 2007	June 30, 2016	16th	NPC	Re-elected in 2013.	1987–2019: Cordon, Dinapigue, Echague, Jones, Ramon, San Agustin, San Isidro, Santiago
5		Ma. Lourdes R. Aggabao	June 30, 2016	June 30, 2019	17th	NPC	Elected in 2016.	1987–2019: Cordon, Dinapigue, Echague, Jones, Ramon, San Agustin, San Isidro, Santiago
6		Alyssa Sheena P. Tan	June 30, 2019	June 30, 2022	18th	PFP	Elected in 2019.	2019–present: Cordon, Dinapigue, Jones, San Agustin, Santiago
6		Alyssa Sheena P. Tan	June 30, 2019	June 30, 2022	18th	NUP	Elected in 2019.	2019–present: Cordon, Dinapigue, Jones, San Agustin, Santiago
6		Alyssa Sheena P. Tan	June 30, 2019	June 30, 2022	18th	PDP–Laban	Elected in 2019.	2019–present: Cordon, Dinapigue, Jones, San Agustin, Santiago
7		Joseph S. Tan	June 30, 2022	Incumbent	19th	Lakas	Elected in 2022.	2019–present: Cordon, Dinapigue, Jones, San Agustin, Santiago
7		Joseph S. Tan	June 30, 2022	Incumbent	20th	PFP	Re-elected in 2025.	2019–present: Cordon, Dinapigue, Jones, San Agustin, Santiago

== Election results ==
=== 2025 ===
Candidate	Party	Votes	%
Joseph Tan (incumbent)	Lakas–CMD	112,993	73.40
Giorgidi Aggabao	Nationalist People's Coalition	39,908	25.92
Jeany Coquilla	Partido Demokratiko Pilipino	1,043	0.68
Total		153,944	100.00
Valid votes		153,944	92.75
Invalid/blank votes		12,029	7.25
Total votes		165,973	100.00
Registered voters/turnout		196,747	84.36
Lakas–CMD hold			
Source: Commission on Elections

=== 2022 ===
2022 Philippine House of Representatives election in Isabela's 4th District
Party	Candidate	Votes	%
PDP–Laban	Joseph Tan	106,651	74.90%
PDDS	Jeanybel "Jeany" Coquilla	30,392	21.34%
NPC	Lucas Florentino	2,855	2.01%
Reporma	Ramon "Monching" Espiritu	1,421	1.00%
Independent	Ellenday "Ellen" Gabriel	1,070	0.75%
Total votes		142,392	100.00%

=== 2019 ===
2019 Philippine House of Representatives election at Isabela's 4th district
Party	Candidate	Votes	%
PFP	Alyssa Sheena Tan	74,225	
NPC	Giorgidi Aggabao	55,815	
PDP–Laban	Heherson Alvarez	1,464	
PDDS	Jeany Coquilla	500	
Total votes			
PFP gain from NPC			

=== 2016 ===
2016 Philippine House of Representatives election at Isabela's 4th district
Party	Candidate	Votes	%
NPC	Ma. Lourdes Aggabao	96,446	46.65
Liberal	Danilo Tan	75,075	36.31
Independent	Hex Alvarez	9,529	4.61
PGRP	Maximo Dirige	3,619	1.75
Independent	Nick De Guzman	1,037	0.50
Valid ballots		185,706	89.83
Invalid or blank votes		21,028	10.17
Total votes		206,734	100.00
NPC hold			

=== 2013 ===
2013 Philippine House of Representatives election at Isabela's 4th district
Party	Candidate	Votes	%
NPC	Giorgidi Aggabao	105,139	64.85
PMP	Anthony Miranda	31,361	19.34
Aksyon	Danilo Tan	6,491	4.00
Valid ballots		142,991	88.20
Invalid or blank votes		19,125	11.80
Total votes		162,116	100.00
NPC hold			

=== 2010 ===
2010 Philippine House of Representatives election at Isabela's 4th district
Party	Candidate	Votes	%
NPC	Giorgidi Aggabao	83,412	48.28
Independent	Danilo Tan	78,228	45.28
Independent	Nicolas de Guzman, Jr.	2,090	1.21
Valid ballots		163,730	94.78
Invalid or blank votes		9,021	5.22
Total votes		172,751	100.00
NPC hold			

== See also ==
- Legislative districts of Isabela
