= Neutral ground =

Neutral ground may refer to:

- Median strip, in New Orleans area English
- Neutral Ground (Louisiana), a no man's land between Spanish Texas and American Louisiana in the early 19th century
- Neutral Ground (Westchester County), an area in Westchester County, New York, during the American Revolution

== See also ==
- Neutral zone (disambiguation)
