= Coridon =

Coridon may refer to:

- an alternative spelling of Corydon, a stock name for a herdsman in Greek and European literature
- Coridon (company), a biotechnology company founded by Australian scientist Ian Frazer
- One of the title characters in the Broadside ballad "Coridon and Parthenia"
- A character in the Venetian tragicomedy Il pastor fido
- A character in the 1718 version of Handel's Acis and Galatea
- A character in Purcell's opera The Fairy Queen
- A character in the Italian literary fairy tale The Pig King

People with the surname, given name, or nickname Coridon include:

- Johannes Glauber (1646–1726), nicknamed Coridon, Dutch Golden Age painter
- Charles-Édouard Coridon (born 1973), Martiniquais footballer

== See also ==
- Lysandra coridon, a species of butterfly
- Cordon (disambiguation)
- Corridon, Missouri
