= Casa del Cordón, Vitoria-Gasteiz =

Building in Vitoria-Gasteiz, Spain

Casa del Cordón
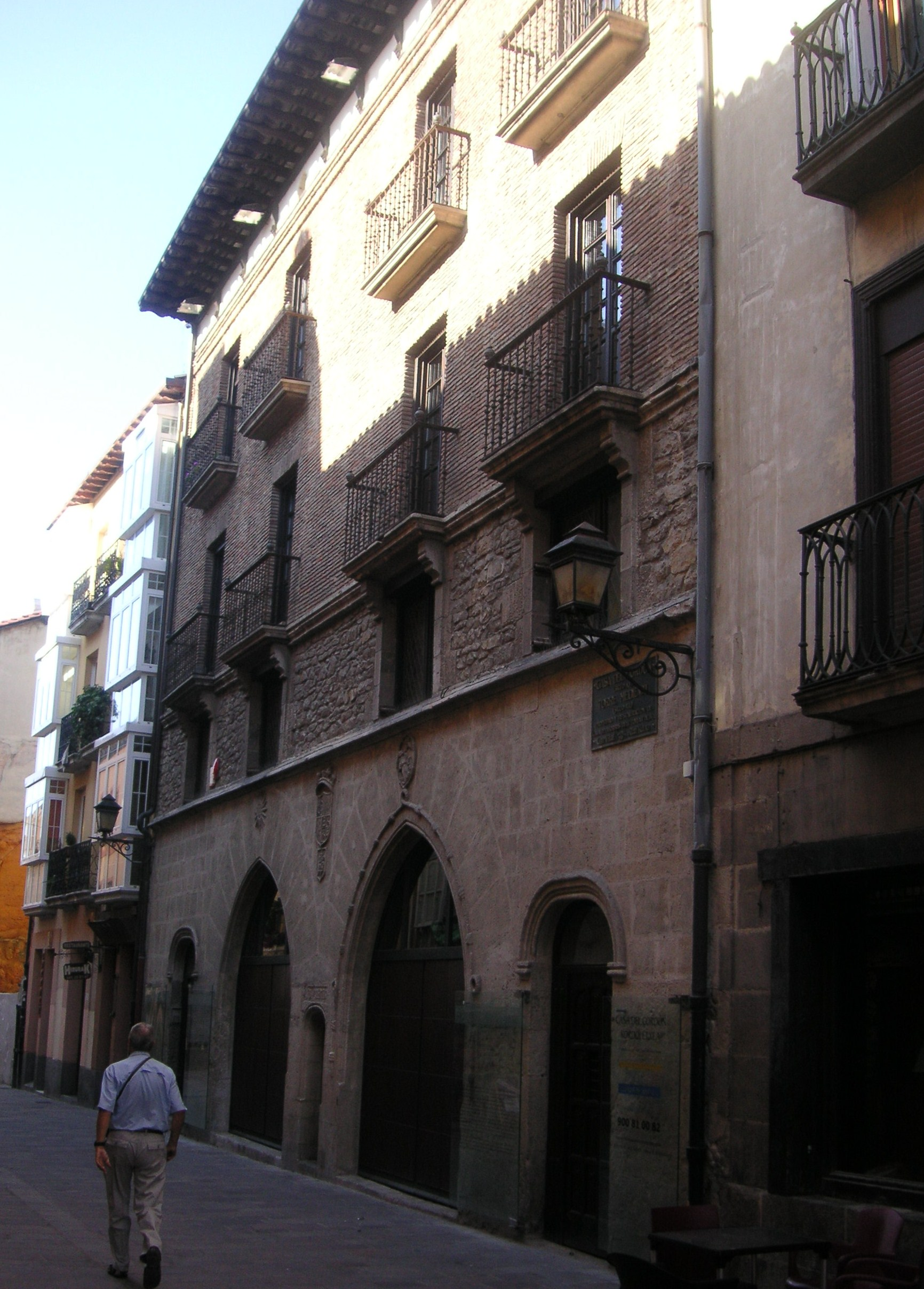

- Location within the Basque Country Location within Spain
- 42.848219°N 2.670743°W
- Location: Vitoria-Gasteiz, Álava, Basque Country, Spain

Spanish Cultural Heritage
- Official name: Palacio Casa del Cordón
- Type: Non-movable
- Criteria: Monument
- Designated: 1984
- Reference no.: RI-51-0005127

The Casa del Cordón (Spanish for 'House of the String', Basque: Sokaren etxea) is a building in Vitoria-Gasteiz, Basque Country, Spain. It was declared Bien de Interés Cultural in 1984. It was built in the 15th century by converso Juan Sánchez de Bilbao around a previously existing tower house. As of 2022, the building is the seat of the Fundación Vital, a banking foundation part of Kutxabank.
