= Dinapigue =

Municipality in Isabela, Philippines

- Municipality
- Municipality of Dinapigue
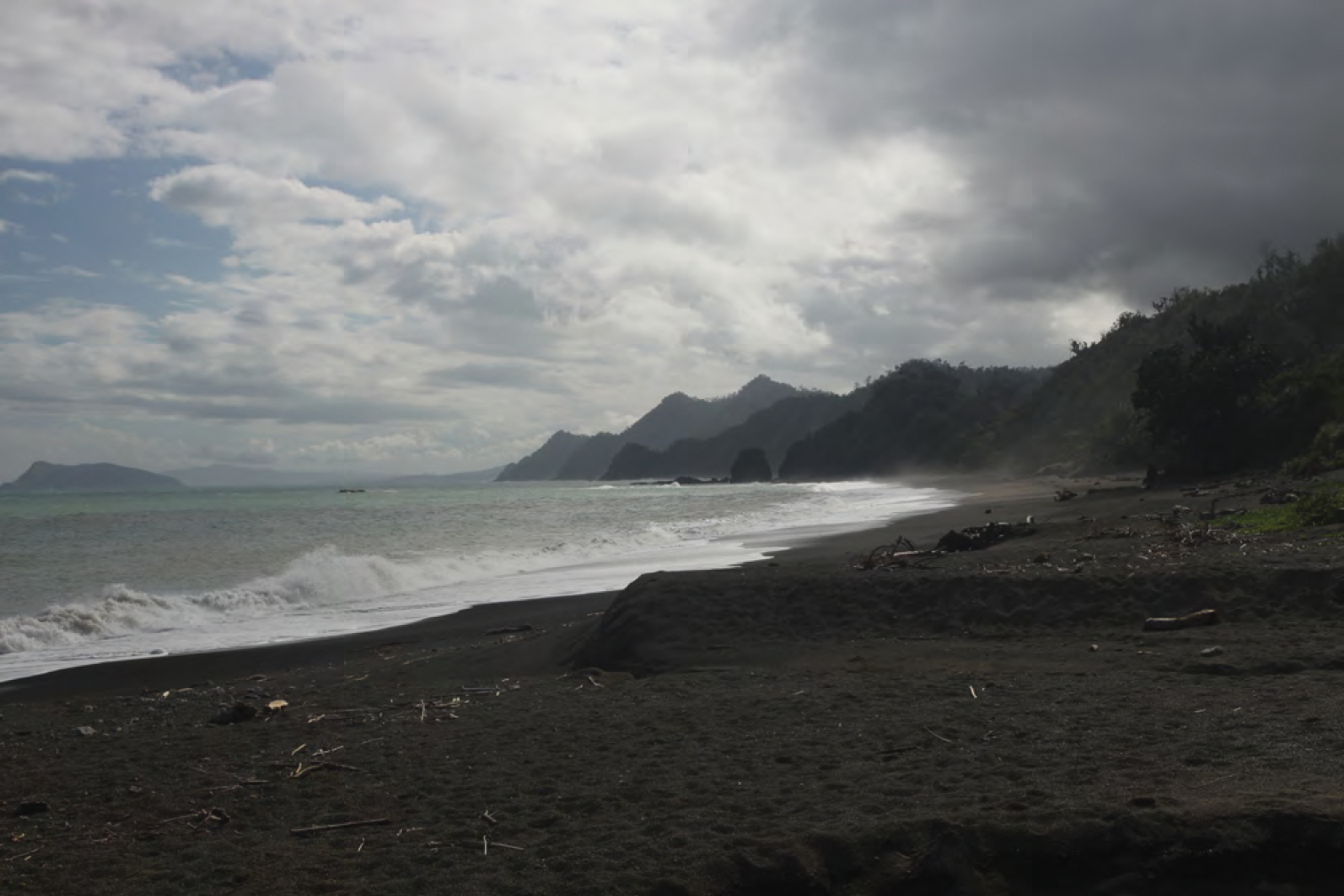
- View of the forested coast of Dinapigue

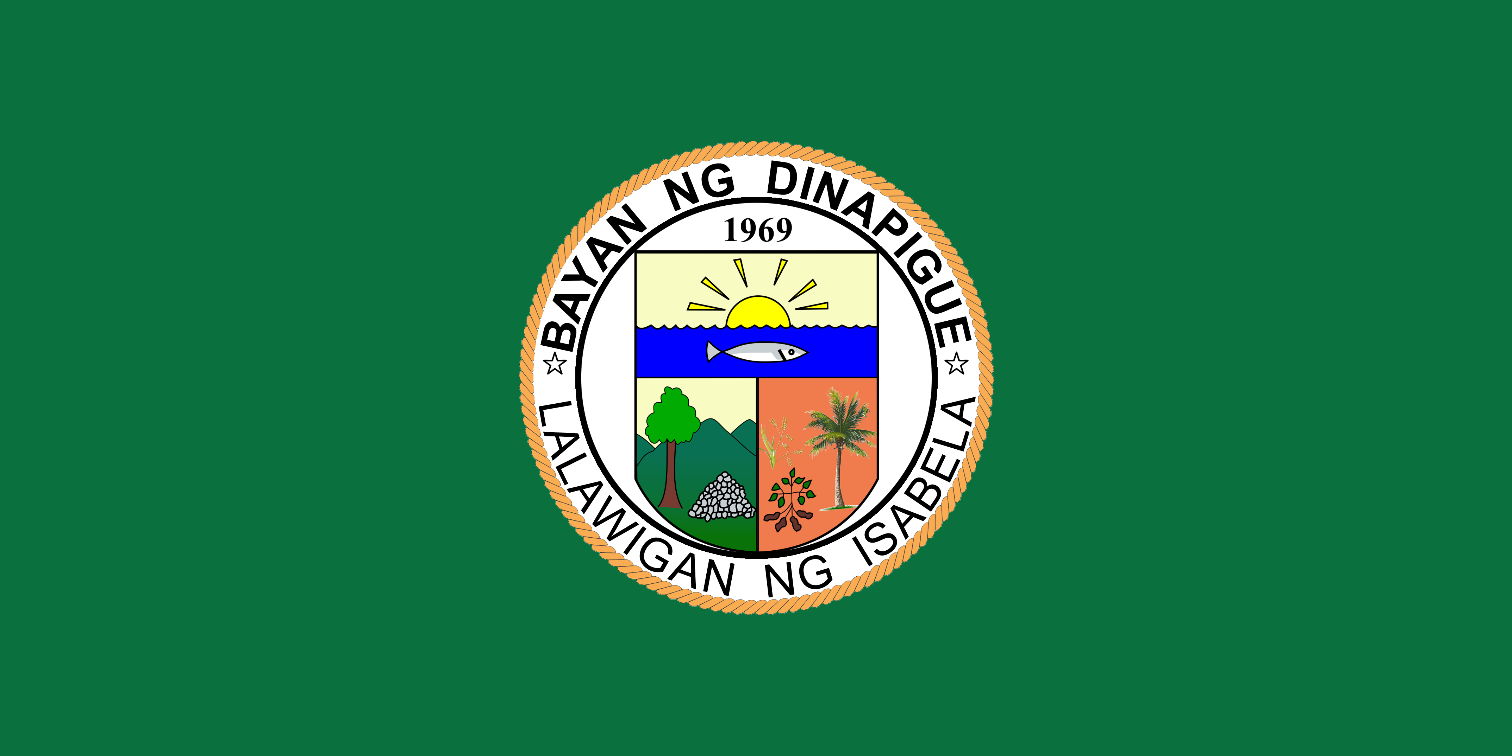
- Flag Seal

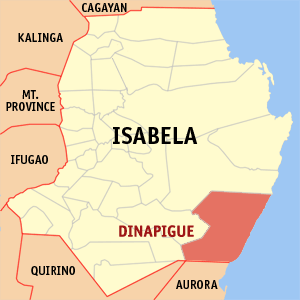
- Map of Isabela with Dinapigue highlighted
- Interactive map of Dinapigue
- Location within the Philippines
- Coordinates: 16°31′30″N 122°15′49″E
- Country: Philippines
- Region: Cagayan Valley
- Province: Isabela
- District: 4th district
- Founded: June 21, 1969
- Barangays: 6 (see Barangays)

Government
  - Type: Sangguniang Bayan
  - Mayor: Vicente D. Mendoza
  - Vice Mayor: Reynaldo D. Derije
  - Representative: Joseph S. Tan
  - Electorate: 5,760 voters (2025)

Area
  - Total: 574.40 km^{2} (221.78 sq mi)
- Elevation: 124 m (407 ft)
- Highest elevation: 745 m (2,444 ft)
- Lowest elevation: 0 m (0 ft)

Population (2024 census)
  - Total: 6,116
  - Density: 10.65/km^{2} (27.58/sq mi)
  - Households: 1,405

Economy
  - Income class: 1st municipal income class
  - Poverty incidence: 44.81% (2018)
  - Revenue: ₱ 292.2 million (2024)
  - Assets: ₱ 899.6 million (2024)
  - Expenditure: ₱ 250.8 million (2024)
  - Liabilities: ₱ 309.6 million (2024)

Service provider
  - Electricity: Aurora Electric Cooperative (AURELCO)
- Time zone: UTC+8 (PST)
- ZIP code: 3336
- PSGC: 0203110000
- IDD : area code: +63 (0)78
- Native languages: Dinapigue Agta; Ibanag; Ilocano; Kasiguranin; Tagalog
- Website: www.dinapigue-isabela.gov.ph

Dinapigue ([ˌdinɐˈpige], sometimes [ˌdinɐˈpigi]), officially the Municipality of Dinapigue (Ibanag: Ili nat Dinapigue; Ilocano: Ili ti Dinapigue; Tagalog/Kasiguranin: Bayan ng Dinapigue), is a municipality in the province of Isabela, Philippines. According to the 2024 census, it has a population of 6,116 people.

== History ==
Dinapigue used to be a barrio of San Mariano, Isabela. On June 21, 1968, Republic Act No. 5776 declared Dinapigue to be a separate municipality.

== Geography ==
Dinapigue or sometimes called Dinapigui is the southernmost coastal town of the province of Isabela. It is one of the four remote and isolated coastal towns of Isabela facing the Philippine Sea on the east and separated from the rest of the province by the Sierra Madre Mountains.

It is bounded by the coastal town of Palanan to the north, San Mariano to the northwest, San Guillermo to the west, Echague to the southwest, Dilasag in the province of Aurora to the south and the Philippine Sea to the east.

Dinapique is situated 272.98 kilometres (169.62 mi) from the provincial capital Ilagan, and 408.34 kilometres (253.73 mi) from the country's capital city of Manila.

=== Barangays ===
Dinapigue is politically subdivided into 6 barangays. Each barangay consists of puroks while some have sitios.

- Ayod
- Bucal Sur
- Bucal Norte
- Dibulo
- Digumased (Poblacion)
- Dimaluade

=== Climate ===
Climate data for Dinapigue, Isabela
Month	Jan	Feb	Mar	Apr	May	Jun	Jul	Aug	Sep	Oct	Nov	Dec	Year
Mean daily maximum °C (°F)	27 (81)	27 (81)	29 (84)	28 (82)	27 (81)	25 (77)	26 (79)	27 (81)	31 (88)	29 (84)	27 (81)	27 (81)	28 (82)
Mean daily minimum °C (°F)	20 (68)	20 (68)	21 (70)	20 (68)	21 (70)	20 (68)	21 (70)	22 (72)	23 (73)	23 (73)	21 (70)	21 (70)	21 (70)
Average precipitation mm (inches)	162 (6.4)	156 (6.1)	90 (3.5)	60 (2.4)	144 (5.7)	201 (7.9)	159 (6.3)	108 (4.3)	111 (4.4)	237 (9.3)	276 (10.9)	171 (6.7)	1,875 (73.9)
Average rainy days	14	12	11	11	16	19	16	14	16	18	18	15	180
Source: World Weather Online (modeled/calculated data, not measured locally)

== Demographics ==
Population census of Dinapigue
Year	Pop.	±% p.a.
1975	932	—
1980	764	−3.90%
1990	2,105	+10.67%
1995	3,046	+7.17%
2000	3,171	+0.87%
2007	4,807	+5.91%
2010	5,484	+4.91%
2015	5,005	−1.73%
2020	5,821	+3.23%
2024	6,116	+1.19%
Source: Philippine Statistics Authority

In the 2024 census, the population of Dinapigue was 6,116 people, with a density of 11 inhabitants per square kilometre or 28 inhabitants per square mile.

== Economy ==
Poverty incidence of Dinapigue (%)

Source: Philippine Statistics Authority

Dinapigue is home to a nickel mine owned by Nickel Asia Corporation.

== Government ==
=== Local government ===
As a municipality in the province of Isabela, government officials at the provincial and municipal levels are voted by the town. The provincial government has political jurisdiction over most local transactions of the municipal government.

The Municipality of Dinapigue is governed by a mayor, designated as its local chief executive, and by a municipal council as its legislative body in accordance with the Local Government Code. The mayor, vice mayor, and the municipal councilors are elected directly by the people through an election held every three years.

Barangays are also headed by elected officials: Barangay Captain, Barangay Council, whose members are called Barangay Councilors. The barangays have SK federation which represents the barangay, headed by SK chairperson and whose members are called SK councilors. All officials are also elected every three years.

=== Elected officials ===
Members of the Municipal Council (2022–2025)
Position	Name
Congressman	Joseph S. Tan
Mayor	Vicente D. Mendoza
Vice-Mayor	Reynaldo D. Derije
Councilors	Samuel P. Cariño
Councilors	Benito J. Monzon
Councilors	Joel B. Araña
Councilors	Aldo Rey T. Vargas
Councilors	Jhonas D. Palitayan
Councilors	Jojit Alexis G. Arana
Councilors	Shelah M. Candido
Councilors	Joselito D. Derije

=== Congress representation ===
Dinapique, belonging to the fourth legislative district of the province of Isabela, is currently represented by Joseph S. Tan.

== Education ==
The Schools Division of Isabela governs the town's public education system. The division office is a field office of the DepEd in Cagayan Valley. The Palanan Schools District Office governs the public and private elementary and public and private high schools throughout the municipality.

=== Elementary schools ===
- Bucal Sur Elementary School
- Dinapigue Central School

=== Secondary schools ===
- Ayod Integrated School
- Dibewan Integrated School
- Dibulo Integrated School
- Dinapigue National High School

== Infrastructure ==
Dinapigue is accessible by land but it can also be accessed by air through Dinapigue Airport. Small time bus companies offer daily trips from Santiago City to Dinapigue via Quirino province through the towns of Dinalungan, Casiguran, and Dilasag in the province Aurora.
