= Jones, Isabela =

Municipality in Isabela, Philippines

Jones
- Municipality
- Municipality of Jones
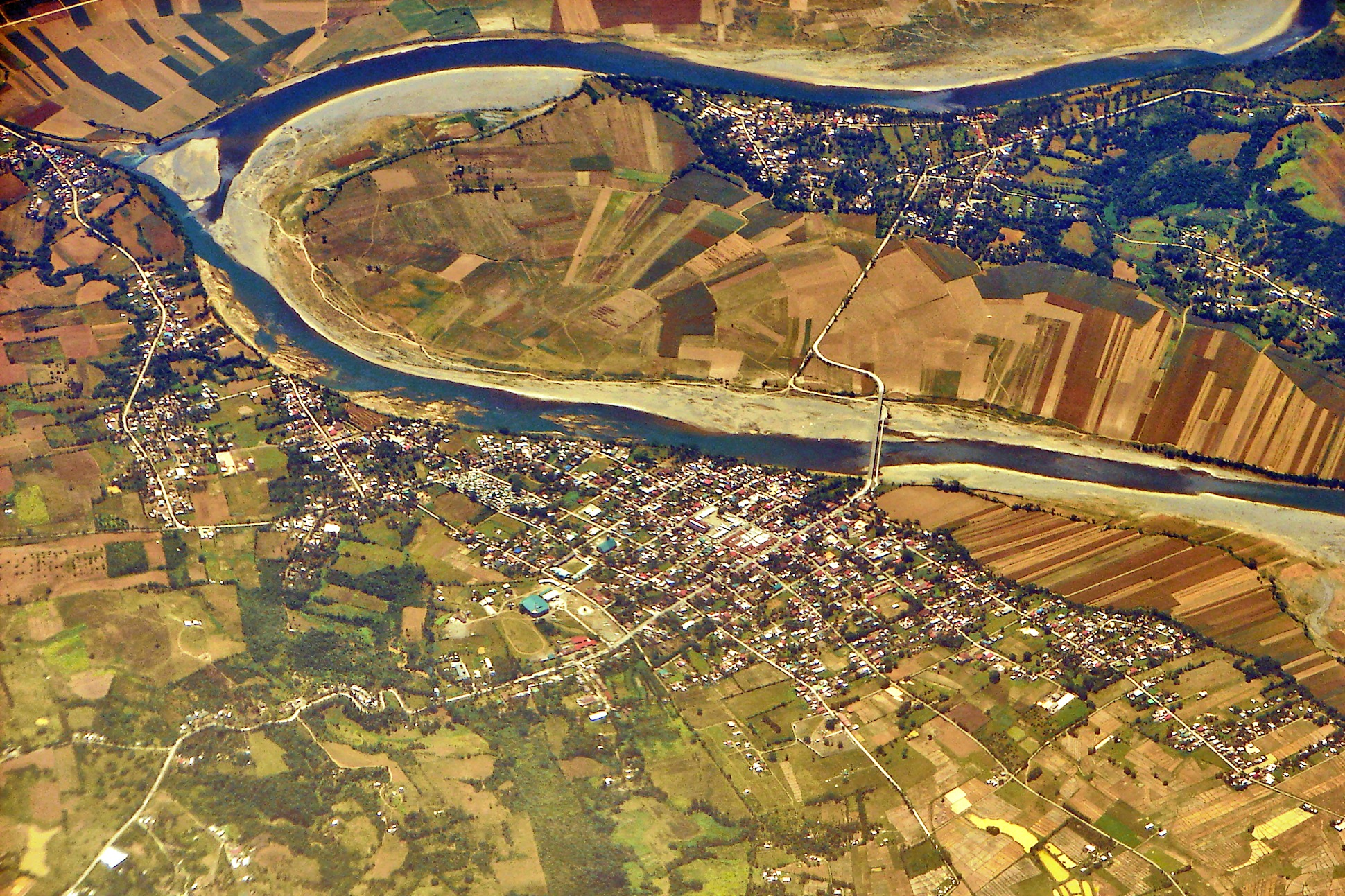
- Aerial view of Jones, Isabela along the Cagayan River

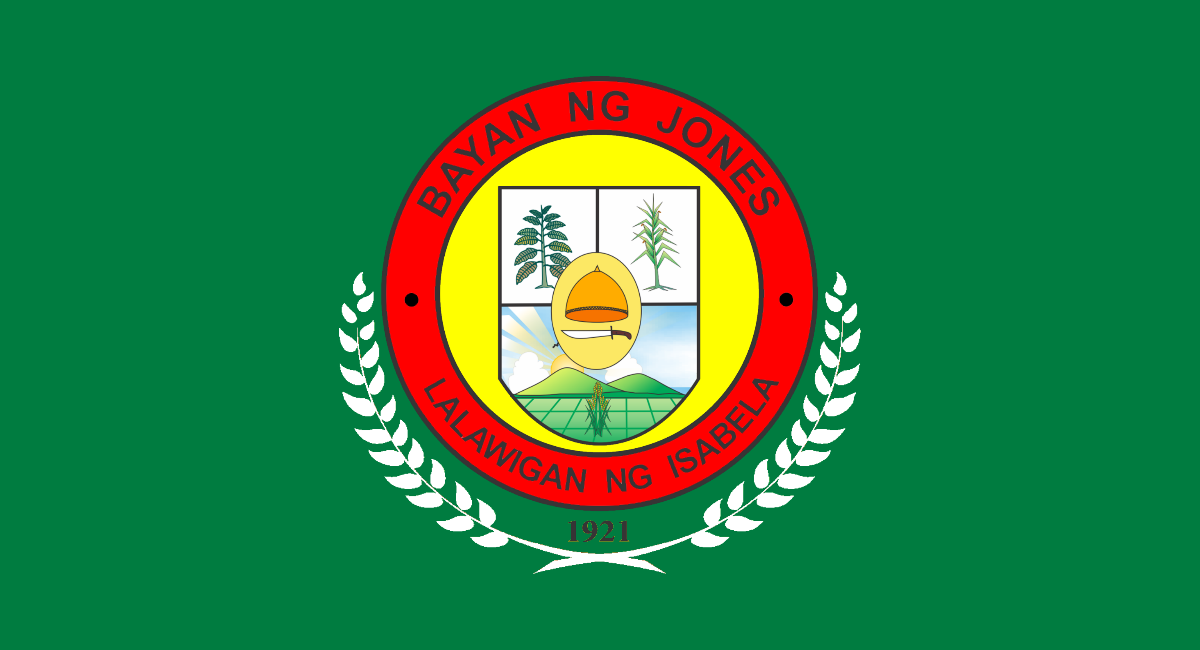
- Flag Seal

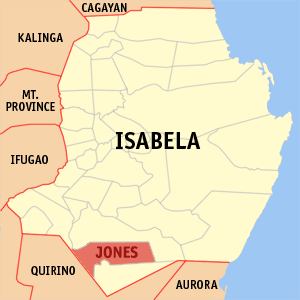
- Map of Isabela with Jones highlighted
- Interactive map of Jones
- Location within the Philippines
- Coordinates: 16°33′30″N 121°42′00″E
- Country: Philippines
- Region: Cagayan Valley
- Province: Isabela
- District: 4th district
- Founded: January 1, 1921
- Named for: William Atkinson Jones
- Barangays: 42 (see Barangays)

Government
  - Type: Sangguniang Bayan
  - Mayor: Nhel C. Montano
  - Vice Mayor: Evelyn R. Raspado
  - Representative: Joseph S. Tan
  - Electorate: 30,296 voters (2025)

Area
  - Total: 670.14 km^{2} (258.74 sq mi)
- Elevation: 101 m (331 ft)
- Highest elevation: 156 m (512 ft)
- Lowest elevation: 65 m (213 ft)

Population (2024 census)
  - Total: 46,160
  - Density: 68.88/km^{2} (178.4/sq mi)
  - Households: 11,804

Economy
  - Income class: 1st municipal income class
  - Poverty incidence: 11.98% (2023)
  - Revenue: ₱ 387 million (2024)
  - Assets: ₱ 1,279 million (2024)
  - Expenditure: ₱ 372 million (2024)
  - Liabilities: ₱ 574.2 million (2024)

Service provider
  - Electricity: Isabela 1 Electric Cooperative (ISELCO 1)
- Time zone: UTC+8 (PST)
- ZIP code: 3313
- PSGC: 0203115000
- IDD : area code: +63 (0)78
- Native languages: Ilocano; Bugkalot; Dicamay Agta; Tagalog
- Website: www.jones-isabela.gov.ph

Jones, officially the Municipality of Jones (Ilocano: Ili ti Jones; Tagalog: Bayan ng Jones), is a municipality in the province of Isabela, Philippines. According to the 2024 census, it has a population of 46,160 people.

== Etymology ==
The town derived its named in honor of William Atkinson Jones, an American legislator who authored the Philippine Autonomy Act of 1916. The town was inaugurated on January 1, 1921. It was initially divided into 21 barrios with virgin forests and wide fertile plains, with Cabanuangan serving as the Municipal Government's seat.

== History ==
The southern portion of Echague separated by the Cagayan River was created into a municipality named Jones in honor of an American Legislator, William Atkinson Jones, who authored the Philippine Autonomy Act of 1916, and was inaugurated on January 1, 1921. It was originally composed of 21 barrios of virgin forests and wide fertile plains with Cabanuangan as the seat of the municipal government.

The house of one Tirso Mateo served as the first town hall, with the following as the first municipal officials: President - Don Antonio Vallejo; Vice President - Benito Tiburcio; Secretary - Francisco Gumpal; Treasurer - Pio Tomines; Justice of Peace - Daniel Apostol; Chief of Police - Zoilo Gadingan; and Modesto Payuyo, Antonio Pintang, Gregorio Santos, Dionicio Cristobal, Valentin Torio, and Damaso Leano as councilors.

The first proposed townsite of Jones was in barrio Daligan, but due to the insistence of the municipal president Don Antonio Vallejo who voluntarily donated two hectares of land for the municipal hall and public market site, he also later donated the vast fertile land area of Jones Rural School and Jones North Central School.

Transportation was then a big problem as there were no good roads, the barrios being connected only by narrow roads and trails suited for hiking, for horses and carabaos, and for sleds and carts. During rainy days, these roads and trails easily turned into knee-deep mud fit only for wallowing carabaos. The principal means of transportation was the Cagayan River passing through almost all the barrios, using raft and boats. It was only after decades that motor vehicles began to ply between Jones and nearby Echague.

The vast virgin forests and fertile soil of the place were populated and harnessed and cultivated by the indigenous Pugots (Aetas) and Ilongots (Bugkalots), and the Yogads who are natives of southern Isabela, particularly the towns of Echague, Angadanan and San Guillermo, and the enterprising Ilocanos who migrated overland for a couple of centuries all the way from the Ilocos region in northwestern Luzon. Other ethnic groups followed like the Gaddangs, Ifugaos and Ibanags, and later, the Tagalogs from Central Luzon.

The Aglipayan Church (Philippine Independent Church) was the first established church in the area, followed later by the Roman Catholic Church and various Protestant denominations. There were very few primary schools, all hinged to an intermediate school called Jones Farm School at the poblacion. The early inhabitants concentrated on agriculture with tobacco, corn and peanuts as primary crops. Revenue principally came from the real property tax, cedula tax and sled tax. The town was then greatly dependent on national aid.

When the Japanese Imperial Army invaded the Philippines in 1941, Jones became a shelter for the national and provincial officials and for evacuees from other places until 1942. The town likewise became the seat of the provincial government from 1941 to 1943. It was subsequently occupied by the Japanese forces, but its forested areas continued to be a stronghold of Filipino guerillas and American soldiers who for a while were under the command of Brigadier General Guillermo Nakar.

In 1945, Filipino troops of the 11th Infantry Regiment, Philippine Commonwealth Army, USAFIP-NL are liberated and recaptured Jones from the Japanese forces. The liberating forces united the scattered guerrilla units who helped in attacking and defeating Japanese forces toward the end of the war.

Jones was the home of Silvino M. Gumpal who led Isabela as governor from 1946 to 1951; earlier, Gumpal represented Isabela in Congress from 1934 to 1935.

On March 28, 1959, the name of barrio Mangaratungot was changed to San Vicente. On September 28 of the same year, the municipality's southern portion was ceded to the newly created municipality of San Agustin.

== Geography ==
Jones is situated 83.64 kilometres (51.97 mi) from the provincial capital Ilagan, and 389.25 kilometres (241.87 mi) from the country's capital city of Manila.

=== Barangays ===
Jones is politically subdivided into 42 barangays. Each barangay consists of puroks while some have sitios.

The barangays are:

- Abulan
- Addalam
- Arubub
- Bannawag
- Bantay
- Barangay I (Poblacion - Centro)
- Barangay II (Poblacion - Centro)
- Barangcuag
- Dalibubon
- Daligan
- Diarao
- Dibuluan
- Dicamay I
- Dicamay II
- Dipangit
- Disimpit
- Divinan
- Dumawing
- Fugu
- Lacab
- Linamanan
- Linomot
- Malannit
- Minuri
- Namnama
- Napaliong
- Palagao
- Papan Este
- Papan Weste
- Payac
- Pungpongan
- San Antonio
- San Isidro
- San Jose
- San Roque
- San Sebastian
- San Vicente
- Santa Isabel
- Santo Domingo
- Tupax
- Usol
- Villa Bello

=== Climate ===
Jones has a trade-wind tropical rainforest climate (Köppen Af).

Climate data for Jones, Isabela
Month	Jan	Feb	Mar	Apr	May	Jun	Jul	Aug	Sep	Oct	Nov	Dec	Year
Mean daily maximum °C (°F)	29 (84)	30 (86)	32 (90)	35 (95)	35 (95)	35 (95)	34 (93)	33 (91)	32 (90)	31 (88)	30 (86)	28 (82)	32 (90)
Mean daily minimum °C (°F)	19 (66)	20 (68)	21 (70)	23 (73)	23 (73)	24 (75)	23 (73)	23 (73)	23 (73)	22 (72)	21 (70)	20 (68)	22 (71)
Average rainfall mm (inches)	138.2 (5.44)	105.8 (4.17)	91.9 (3.62)	99.7 (3.93)	184.9 (7.28)	170.9 (6.73)	300.9 (11.85)	264.8 (10.43)	274.5 (10.81)	334.4 (13.17)	229.2 (9.02)	292.4 (11.51)	2,487.6 (97.96)
Average rainy days	10	6	5	5	13	12	15	15	15	17	16	15	144
Source: World Weather Online

== Demographics ==
Population census of Jones

Year	Pop.	±% p.a.
1939	14,703	—
1948	17,776	+2.13%
1960	17,334	−0.21%
1970	25,657	+3.99%
1975	26,380	+0.56%
1980	28,828	+1.79%
1990	34,373	+1.78%

Year	Pop.	±% p.a.
1995	34,669	+0.16%
2000	39,001	+2.56%
2007	41,237	+0.77%
2010	44,218	+2.57%
2015	45,666	+0.62%
2020	45,628	−0.02%
2024	46,160	+0.28%

Source: Philippine Statistics Authority

In the 2024 census, the population of Jones was 46,160 people, with a density of 69 inhabitants per square kilometer or 180 inhabitants per square mile.

There was originally a population of Agta [Pugot/Aeta] living in the vicinity of Jones, along the Dicamay River. The Agta are one of the many groups known as 'Negritos' and who are descended from the pre-Austronesian population of the islands. The Dicamay Agta, who combined hunter-gathering with swidden agriculture, have been severely impacted by the influx of other ethnic groups who took up hillside and farm lands, resulting in there being no Agta living in the area today. There are numerous reports of the Agta having been driven off their lands, and in some cases of having been killed by immigrant groups of farmers.

=== Languages ===
Jones is dominantly using these languages: Ilocano, Yogad, Bugkalot/Ilongot, Dicamay Agta. English, being one of the official languages is used primarily in communication for government publications, local newsprints, road signs, commercial signs and in doing official business transactions. Tagalog, another official language and is also considered the national language is used as verbal communication channel among residents.

== Economy ==
Poverty incidence of Jones (%)

Source: Philippine Statistics Authority

Jones is primarily an agricultural municipality best suited for the intensive production of rice and corn as evidence by its topographic map which shows that 73% of the agricultural area of 16,848 hectares is under 0-3 slope category.

== Culture ==
Pinilisa Festival

The Pinilisa Festival is an acknowledgment of the culture of Jonesians and celebrated every March 17th to rejoice over the harvests of Pinilisa, an organic plum-colored rice known in the region as well as other countries due to its fragrance and flavor. Unlike other varieties that rely on synthetic commercial fertilizer to grow healthy, Phinilisa can function in rainwater and the alluvial soil in the area. Its features make it a favorite staple food and primary ingredient for native rice cakes and other products.

The success of the first Pinilisa Festival was conceptualized by the initiative of the administration of Florante A. Raspado, its first festival director-general. The festival was easily produced and marked the history of the town of Jones and one among the line-up of the Department of Tourism Wow! Philippines Program, making Pinilisa Festival is recognized not only in the Philippines but as well as on the world. The famous product “Pinilsa Rice” of Jones has given birth to the now famous Pinilisa Festival of Jones and is now identified and included in the list and calendar of the famous festival in the country maintained and documented by the Department of Tourism. Tourism Regional Director Blessida G. Diwa is among the patrons of the Pinilisa Festival, showing consistent support for the promotion of the Festival.

Saba Festival

Dicamay people also celebrates the Banana “Saba” festival in the month of May. In this month people choose a day where they gather to the Barangay center for celebration, “Thanksgiving mass” is held in the morning and other activities in the evening where each purok/zone members shall have presentations for people enjoyment.

== Tourism ==
Sibsib falls is the known tourist spot in Dicamay 2 which is 4 km from the barangay proper.

== Infrastructure ==
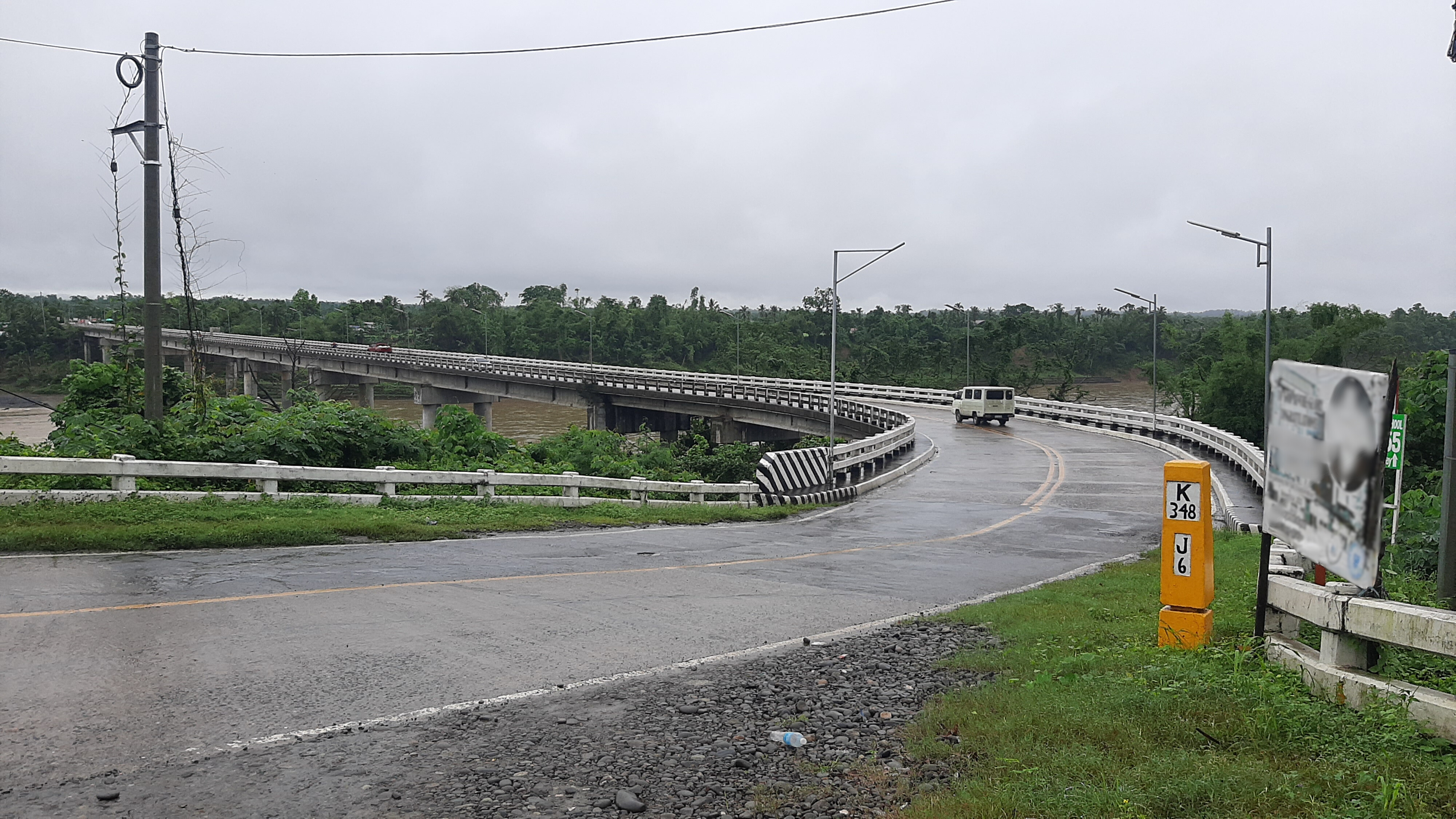
Dalibubon Bridge in Jones, Isabela

The municipality is 370 kilometres north from Metro Manila and about 90 kilometres from Ilagan City, the province's capital, 44 kilometres from Santiago, Isabela and 31 kilometers from a junction at Barangay Ipil in the municipality of Echague.

GV Florida Transport is one of the biggest bus transportation in Northern Philippines, particularly Cagayan Valley is currently serving the town & that serves Executive Deluxe Buses (with restroom) - (Jones, Isabela - Sampaloc, Manila via TPLEX.

Jones is accessed by UV Express Vans from Santiago to San Agustin.

Jones has two steel bridges, the Dalibubon bridge, now known as Jones I Bridge, which serves as the northern boundary between Jones and Echague, and the Embarcadero bridge, now known as Jones II Bridge, which leads to San Agustin, the southeastern-most town of Isabela.

== Government ==
=== Local government ===
As a municipality in the Province of Isabela, government officials at the provincial and municipal levels are voted by the town. The provincial government has political jurisdiction over most local transactions of the municipal government.

The municipality of Jones is governed by a mayor, designated as its local chief executive, and by a municipal council as its legislative body in accordance with the Local Government Code. The mayor, vice mayor, and the municipal councilors are elected directly by the people in elections held every three years.

Barangays are also headed by elected officials: Barangay Captain, Barangay Council, whose members are called Barangay Councilors. The barangays have SK federation which represents the barangay, headed by SK chairperson and whose members are called SK councilors. All officials are also elected every three years.

=== Elected officials ===
Members of the Jones Municipal Council (2022-2025)
Position	Name
District Representative	Joseph S. Tan
Municipal Mayor	Nhel C. Montano
Municipal Vice-Mayor	Evelyn R. Raspado
Municipal Councilors	Cynthia C. Bangloy
Municipal Councilors	Arland F. Ramos
Municipal Councilors	Virginia B. Sy
Municipal Councilors	Julius A. Raspado
Municipal Councilors	John M. Sabiniano
Municipal Councilors	Irene Aggabao
Municipal Councilors	Jervin Reyes
Municipal Councilors	Sir Arthur Jhan Z. Anunciacion

=== Congress representation ===
Jones, belonging to the fourth legislative district of the province of Isabela, currently represented by Hon. Joseph S. Tan.

== Education ==
The Schools Division of Isabela governs the town's public education system. The division office is a field office of the DepEd in Cagayan Valley region. Jones has two school district offices namely, Jones East, and Jones West, that govern both the public and private elementary and high schools throughout the municipality.

=== Primary and elementary schools ===
- A.C. Ruiz Elementary School
- Addalam Primary School
- Arubub Primary School
- Bannawag Elementary School
- Bantay Primary School
- Barangcuag Primary School
- Dalibubon Elementary School
- Daligan Elementary School
- Diarao Elementary School
- Dicamay I Elementary School
- Dicamay II Elementary School
- Dicamay National High School
- Dipangit Primary School
- Disimpit Elementary School
- Divinan Elementary School
- Dumawing Elementary School
- Fugu Elementary School
- Graceway Baptist Academy
- Jones East Central School
- Jones West Central School-Campus 1
- Jones West Central School-Campus 2
- JT Sebastian Primary School
- La Salette of Jones, Inc.
- Lacab Primary School
- Linamanan Elementary School
- Linomt Elementary School
- Malannit Elementary School
- Minuri Elementary School - Annex
- Minuri Elementary School - Main
- Namnama Elementary School
- Papan Elementary School
- Papan Weste Primary School
- Payac Elementary School
- Pungpongan Primary School
- San Antonio Elementary School
- San Isidro Elementary School
- San Isidro PS - Annex (Bliss), LSB
- San Jose Primary School
- San Sebastian Integrated School
- San Vicente Elementary School
- Sta. Isabel Elementary School
- Sto. Domingo Elementary School - Main
- Sto. Domingo ES - Annex (LSB)
- Tubar Elementary School
- Usol Elementary School
- Villa Bello Elementary School
- Villa Saruccad Tribal Elementary School

=== Secondary schools ===
- Addalam Region High School (Main)
- Addalam Region High School (Divinan Annex)
- Dibuluan National High School
- Jones Rural School
- Jones West High School (formerly Jones Rural School - Malannit Annex)
- Sgt. Prospero Bello High School (Main)
- Sgt. Prospero G. Bello High School (Dumawing Annex)
