= Kordon, Kosinsky District, Perm Krai =

Kordon Кордон
- Settlement
- Location within Perm Krai Location within Russia
- Coordinates: 59°57′N 55°02′E
- Country: Russia
- Region: Perm Krai
- District: Kosinsky District
- Time zone: UTC+5:00

Kordon (Russian: Кордон) is a rural locality (a settlement) in Kosinskoye Rural Settlement, Kosinsky District, Perm Krai, Russia. The population was 1,100 as of 2010. There are 17 streets.

== Geography ==
It is located 3 km north-east from Kosa.
