= Kordon, Kishertsky District, Perm Krai =

Kordon Кордон
- Settlement
- Location within Perm Krai Location within Russia
- Coordinates: 57°24′N 57°55′E
- Country: Russia
- Region: Perm Krai
- District: Kishertsky District
- Time zone: UTC+5:00

Kordon (Russian: Кордон) is a rural locality (a settlement) in Kishertsky District, Perm Krai, Russia. The population was 1,327 as of 2010. There are 24 streets.

== Geography ==
Kordon is located between Bolshaya and Malaya Molyobka, 51 km east of Ust-Kishert (the district's administrative centre) by road. Burylovo is the nearest rural locality.
