= Françoise Cordon =

French actress

Francoise Cordon, stage name Mademoiselle Bellonde (1650s–1716), was a French stage actress.

She was engaged at the Hôtel de Bourgogne in 1679. She became a Sociétaires of the Comédie-Française in 1680. She retired in 1695.

She was born in Paris, but left the city to tour around France in a travelling theatre company, in which she achieved great success in the provinces, particularly in Marseille, and acquired a Gascogne-accent, which was noted when the returned to Paris. In 1679, she was engaged at Bourgogne by recommendation of the duc de Vivonne and the duchesse de Nevers to replace Mademoiselle Champmeslé, who had left the theatre for the Hôtel de Guénégaud. She played tragedienne with success and Bellonde of the Bourgogne was compared with Champmesle of the Guénégaud until the two theatres were united in the Comédie-Française in 1680. After this, she gradually came to act only as the replacement of Champmesle, and playing the second and third roles of tragedies.
