= Kordon, Altai Krai =

Kordon Кордон
- Selo
- Location within Altai Krai Location within Russia
- Coordinates: 54°11′N 84°57′E
- Country: Russia
- Region: Altai Krai
- District: Zalesovsky District
- Time zone: UTC+7:00

Kordon (Russian: Кордон) is a rural locality (a selo) in Kordonsky Selsoviet, Zalesovsky District, Altai Krai, Russia. The population was 646 as of 2013. There are 18 streets.

== Geography ==
Kordon is located 38 km northeast of Zalesovo (the district's administrative centre) by road. Peshcherka is the nearest rural locality.
