= Philippine House Committee on Revision of Laws =

Standing committee of the House of Representatives of the Philippines

Committee on Revision of Laws
- 20th Congress

History
- New session started: To convene on July 28, 2025

Leadership
- Chairman: Vacant
- Minority Leader: Vacant

Website
- Committee on Revision of Laws

The Philippine House Committee on Revision of Laws, or House Revision of Laws Committee is a standing committee of the Philippine House of Representatives.

== Jurisdiction ==
As prescribed by House Rules, the committee's jurisdiction is on the revision and codification of laws of the Philippines.

== Members, 20th Congress ==
As of June 30, 2025, all committee membership positions are vacant until the House convenes for its first regular session on July 28.

== Historical membership rosters ==
=== 18th Congress ===
Position	Members	Party	Province/City	District
Chairperson	Cheryl Deloso-Montalla	Liberal	Zambales	2nd
Vice Chairperson	Vicente Veloso III	NUP	Leyte	3rd
Members for the Majority	Tyrone Agabas	NPC	Pangasinan	6th
Members for the Majority	Cesar Jimenez Jr.	PDP–Laban	Zamboanga City	1st
Members for the Majority	Solomon Chungalao	NPC	Ifugao	Lone
Members for the Majority	Alyssa Sheena Tan	PFP	Isabela	4th
Members for the Majority	Juliette Uy	NUP	Misamis Oriental	2nd
Members for the Minority	Lawrence Lemuel Fortun	Nacionalista	Agusan del Norte	1st
Members for the Minority	Argel Joseph Cabatbat	MAGSASAKA	Party-list	
Members for the Minority	Gabriel Bordado Jr.	Liberal	Camarines Sur	3rd

== See also ==
- House of Representatives of the Philippines
- List of Philippine House of Representatives committees
