= San Agustin, Isabela =

Municipality in Isabela, Philippines

San Agustin
- Municipality
- Municipality of San Agustin
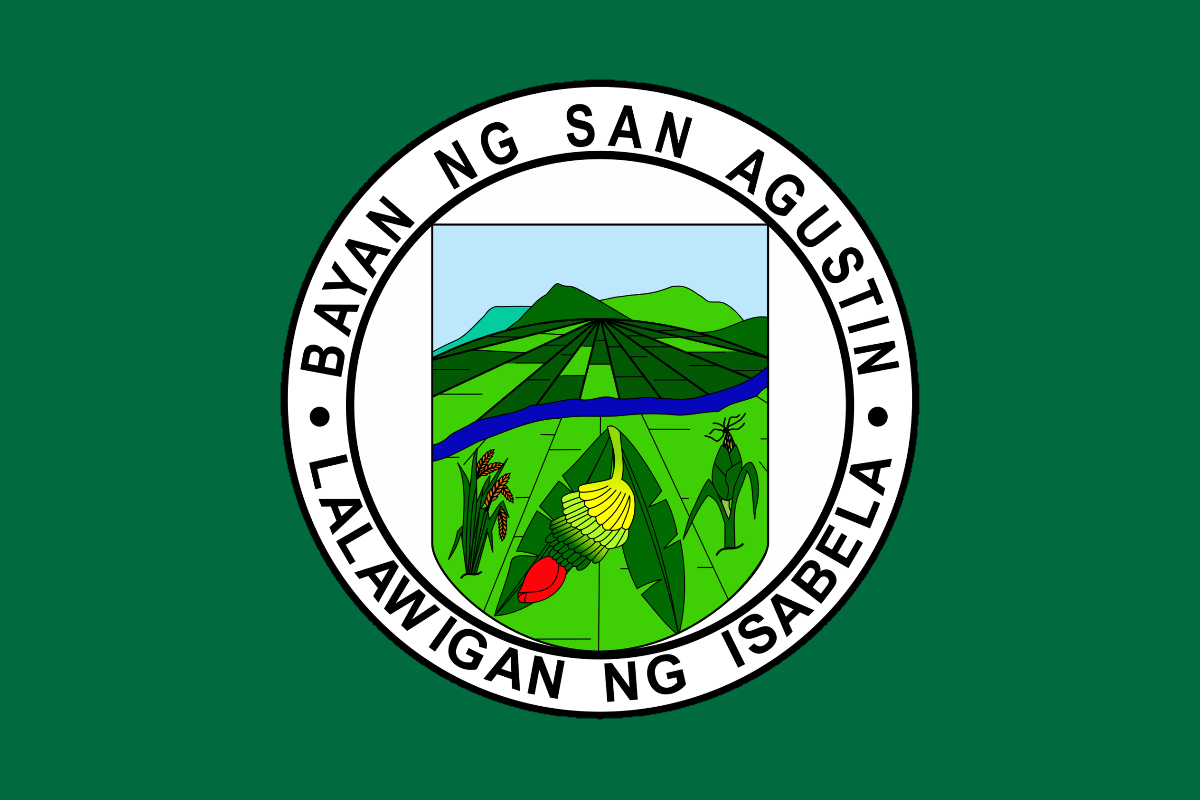
- Flag Seal
- Nickname: Crossbred Capital of the Philippines
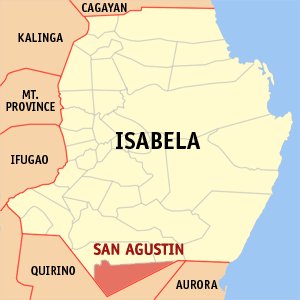
- Map of Isabela with San Agustin highlighted
- Interactive map of San Agustin
- Location within the Philippines
- Coordinates: 16°31′N 121°45′E
- Country: Philippines
- Region: Cagayan Valley
- Province: Isabela
- District: 4th district
- Named for: St. Augustine of Hippo
- Barangays: 23 (see Barangays)

Government
  - Type: Sangguniang Bayan
  - Mayor: Cesar A. Mondala
  - Vice Mayor: Oliver D. Micu
  - Representative: Joseph S. Tan
  - Electorate: 15,378 voters (2025)

Area
  - Total: 278.40 km^{2} (107.49 sq mi)
- Elevation: 125 m (410 ft)
- Highest elevation: 309 m (1,014 ft)
- Lowest elevation: 84 m (276 ft)

Population (2024 census)
  - Total: 22,228
  - Density: 79.842/km^{2} (206.79/sq mi)
  - Households: 5,544

Economy
  - Income class: 2nd municipal income class
  - Poverty incidence: 11.86% (2023)
  - Revenue: ₱ 184.4 million (2024)
  - Assets: ₱ 543 million (2024)
  - Expenditure: ₱ 177.5 million (2024)
  - Liabilities: ₱ 127.3 million (2024)

Service provider
  - Electricity: Isabela 1 Electric Cooperative (ISELCO 1)
- Time zone: UTC+8 (PST)
- ZIP code: 3314
- PSGC: 0203127000
- IDD : area code: +63 (0)78
- Native languages: Ilocano; Bugkalot; Tagalog
- Website: www.sanagustin-isabela.gov.ph

San Agustin, officially the Municipality of San Agustin (Ilocano: Ili ti San Agustin; Tagalog: Bayan ng San Agustin), is a municipality in the province of Isabela, Philippines. According to the 2024 census, it has a population of 22,228 people.

== Etymology ==
The town is a Spanish form of its namesake, Saint Augustine of Hippo.

== History ==
The town was created by virtue of Executive Order No. 269 by then President Elpidio Quirino on September 28, 1949, out of the southern portion of the municipality of Jones. The first municipal officials were elected on November 15, 1949.

In the old days, the present site of San Agustin was a hinterland inhabited by headhunting Ilongots and some scattered bands of Aetas locally known as "Pogot". It was then a part of the municipality of Echague. From this town sailed forth a band of pioneers led by Juan Gumpal, Antonio Pintang, and Vicente Taguiam. They penetrated the wilderness and explored the valleys along both sides of the Cagayan River. They put up scattered settlements which were often plagued by malaria, and marauding Ilongots and Pogots, but the pioneers stayed put and in the end they were able to befriend Ilongots and Aetas and survived malaria. Not long after, the scattered settlements grew into sitios and one of them was Lakay-lakay (named after the creek) on the western side of the Cagayan River. The place is now "Masaya Centro", the seat of the municipal government of San Agustin.

When Jones was organized into an independent municipality in 1921, 30 barrios were separated from the municipality of Echague and one of them was Masaya. Because all the barrios of Jones prospered and there were no good roads connecting the barrios at that time, the people of Masaya and adjoining barrios petitioned the President of the Philippines to organize the barrios into a regular town.

In 1959, the barrio of Uldogan was renamed Laoag.

San Agustin is the home of the Nuang Festival, the annual celebration in honor of the sturdy carabao and in recognition of the highly successful Carabao Upgrading Program of the local government, through the Office of the Municipal Agriculturist and its cooperating agencies and stakeholders. The program was commenced in 1993 by then Mayor Jesus M. Silorio. This was continued under the successive administrations of Mayor Virgilio A. Padilla and Mayor Operaflor A. Manuel. Under the latter's leadership, the Festival was started.

== Geography ==
San Agustin is situated 93.22 kilometres (57.92 mi) from the provincial capital Ilagan, and 398.83 kilometres (247.82 mi) from the country's capital city of Manila.

=== Barangays ===
San Agustin is politically subdivided into 23 barangays. Each barangay consists of puroks while some have sitios.

- Bautista
- Calaocan
- Dabubu Grande
- Dabubu Pequeño
- Dappig
- Laoag
- Mapalad
- Masaya Centro (Poblacion)
- Masaya Norte
- Masaya Sur
- Nemmatan
- Palacian
- Panang
- Quimalabasa Norte
- Quimalabasa Sur
- Rang-ay
- Salay
- San Antonio
- Santo Niño
- Santos
- Sinaoangan Norte
- Sinaoangan Sur
- Virgoneza

=== Climate ===
Climate data for San Agustin, Isabela
Month	Jan	Feb	Mar	Apr	May	Jun	Jul	Aug	Sep	Oct	Nov	Dec	Year
Mean daily maximum °C (°F)	29 (84)	30 (86)	32 (90)	35 (95)	35 (95)	35 (95)	34 (93)	33 (91)	32 (90)	31 (88)	30 (86)	28 (82)	32 (90)
Mean daily minimum °C (°F)	19 (66)	20 (68)	21 (70)	23 (73)	23 (73)	24 (75)	23 (73)	23 (73)	23 (73)	22 (72)	21 (70)	20 (68)	22 (71)
Average precipitation mm (inches)	31.2 (1.23)	23 (0.9)	27.7 (1.09)	28.1 (1.11)	113.5 (4.47)	141.4 (5.57)	176.4 (6.94)	236.6 (9.31)	224.9 (8.85)	247.7 (9.75)	222.9 (8.78)	178 (7.0)	1,651.4 (65)
Average rainy days	10	6	5	5	13	12	15	15	15	17	16	15	144
Source: World Weather Online

== Demographics ==
Population census of San Agustin
Year	Pop.	±% p.a.
1960	10,136	—
1970	13,294	+2.75%
1975	14,862	+2.26%
1980	14,880	+0.02%
1990	16,577	+1.09%
1995	17,861	+1.41%
2000	19,927	+2.37%
2007	20,681	+0.51%
2010	21,797	+1.93%
2015	22,880	+0.93%
2020	22,096	−0.73%
2024	22,228	+0.14%
Source: Philippine Statistics Authority

In the 2024 census, the population of San Agustin was 22,228 people, with a density of 80 inhabitants per square kilometre or 210 inhabitants per square mile.

== Economy ==
Poverty incidence of San Agustin (%)

Source: Philippine Statistics Authority

== Government ==
=== Local government ===
As a municipality in the Province of Isabela, government officials at the provincial and municipal levels are voted by the town. The provincial government has political jurisdiction over most local transactions of the municipal government.

The Municipality of San Agustin is governed by a mayor, designated as its local chief executive, and by a municipal council as its legislative body in accordance with the Local Government Code. The mayor, vice mayor, and the municipal councilors are elected directly by the people through elections held every three years.

Barangays are also headed by elected officials: Barangay Captain, Barangay Council, whose members are called Barangay Councilors. The barangays have SK federation which represents the barangay, headed by SK chairperson and whose members are called SK councilors. All officials are also elected every three years.

=== Elected officials ===
Members of the San Agustin Municipal Council (2022-2025)
Position	Name
District Representative	Joseph S. Tan
Municipal Mayor	Cesar A. Mondala
Municipal Vice-Mayor	Oliver D. Micu
Municipal Councilors	Raden A. Mondala
Municipal Councilors	Eddie L. Domingo
Municipal Councilors	Paul Jerrymie P. Suni
Municipal Councilors	Manuel Respicio
Municipal Councilors	Menchie D. Yasol
Municipal Councilors	Marilou M. Daguro
Municipal Councilors	Artemio P. Guerrero
Municipal Councilors	Rocelyn C. Vargas

=== Congress representation ===
San Agustin, belonging to the Fourth legislative district of the province of Isabela, is currently represented by Hon. Joseph S. Tan.

== Education ==
The Schools Division of Isabela governs the town's public education system. The division office is a field office of the DepEd in Cagayan Valley region. The San Agustin Schools District Office governs the public and private elementary and high schools throughout the municipality.

=== Primary and elementary schools ===
- Bautista Elementary School (Main)
- Bautista Elementary School (Annex)
- Calaocan Primary School
- Dabubu Grande Elementary School
- Dabubu Elementary School
- Dappig Primary School
- Dorganda Elementary School
- Mapalad Elementary School
- Masaya Norte Primary School
- Masaya Sur Elementary School
- Montemar-Santos Toddlers Gallery
- Nemmatan Primary School
- Palacian Elementary School
- Panang Elementary School
- Quimalabasa Norte Elementary School
- Quimalabasa Sur Primary School
- Salay Elementary School
- San Agustin Central School
- San Antonio Elementary School
- Santos Primary School
- Sinaoangan Norte Elementary School
- Sinaoangan Sur Elementary School
- Sto. Nino Elementary School
- Virgonesa Elementary School

=== Secondary schools ===
- Dabubu High School
- Dorganda High School
- Northeastern Integrated School
- Our Lady of the Pillar College Cauayan - San Agustin Campus
- San Agustin National High School
- Southeastern Region High School
