= 2013 Philippine House of Representatives elections in Cagayan Valley =

Elections were held in the Cagayan Valley for seats in the House of Representatives of the Philippines on May 13, 2013.

The candidate with the most votes won that district's seat for the 16th Congress of the Philippines.

== Summary ==
Party	Popular vote	%	Swing	Seats won	Change
NPC				4	
Liberal				2	
Nacionalista				2	
NUP				2	
Aksyon				0	
PMP				0	
UNA				0	
Independent				0	
Valid votes				10	
Invalid votes					
Turnout					
Registered voters					

== Batanes ==
Henedina Abad is the incumbent.

2013 Philippine House of Representatives election at Batanes
Party	Candidate	Votes	%	±%
Liberal	Henedina Abad	3,813	45.74	+8.67
Independent	Carlo Oliver Diasnes	3,676	44.10	+8.09
UNA	Anacleto Mendoza	847	10.16	+10.16
Margin of victory		137	1.64	+0.58
Total votes		8,336	100	
Liberal hold		Swing	+8.38	

== Cagayan ==
=== 1st District ===
Incumbent Jack Enrile is running for the Senate; his wife Salvacion is his party's nominee.

2013 Philippine House of Representatives election at Cagayan's 1st district
Party	Candidate	Votes	%
NPC	Salvacion Ponce Enrile	84,869	57.31
Liberal	Ignacio Taruc III	34,324	23.18
Margin of victory		50,545	34.13%
Invalid or blank votes		28,884	19.51
Total votes		148,077	100.00
NPC hold			

=== 2nd District ===
Baby Aline Vargas-Alfonso is the incumbent after winning a special election when Florencio Vargas, her father, died. As a result of independent candidate Sherwin Calimag's disqualification, Vargas-Alfonso is running unopposed.

2013 Philippine House of Representatives election at Cagayan's 2nd district
Party	Candidate	Votes	%
NUP	Baby Aline Vargas-Alfonso	64,917	66.89
Invalid or blank votes		32,131	33.11
Total votes		97,048	100.00
NUP hold			

=== 3rd District ===
Randolph Ting is the incumbent.

2013 Philippine House of Representatives election at Cagayan's 3rd district
Party	Candidate	Votes	%
NUP	Randolph Ting	90,537	61.61
Liberal	Raymund Guzman	32,750	22.29
Margin of victory		57,787	39.33%
Invalid or blank votes		23,659	16.10
Total votes		146,946	100.00
NUP hold			

== Isabela ==
=== 1st District ===
Rodolfo Albano Jr. is running for mayor of Cabagan, Isabela. His son, incumbent Vice Governor Rodolfo Albano III is his party's nominee

2013 Philippine House of Representatives election at Isabela's 1st district
Party	Candidate	Votes	%
NPC	Rodolfo Albano III	66,536	83.61
Independent	Stephen Soliven	1,491	1.87
Margin of victory		65,045	81.74%
Invalid or blank votes		14,534	18.26
Total votes		79,579	100.00
NPC hold			

=== 2nd District ===
Ana Cristina Go is the incumbent.

2013 Philippine House of Representatives election at Isabela's 2nd district
Party	Candidate	Votes	%
Nacionalista	Ana Cristina Go	66,457	61.22
Liberal	Edwin Uy	33,168	30.55
Margin of victory		33,289	30.64%
Invalid or blank votes		8,938	8.23
Total votes		108,563	100.00
Nacionalista hold			

=== 3rd District ===
Napoleon Dy is the incumbent.

2013 Philippine House of Representatives election at Isabela's 3rd district
Party	Candidate	Votes	%
NPC	Napoleon Dy	77,536	68.64
Aksyon	Ramon Reyes	21,644	19.16
Margin of victory		55,892	49.48%
Invalid or blank votes		13,788	12.21
Total votes		112,968	100.00
NPC hold			

=== 4th District ===
Giorgidi Aggabao is the incumbent.

2013 Philippine House of Representatives election at Isabela's 4th district
Party	Candidate	Votes	%
NPC	Giorgidi Aggabao	105,139	64.85
PMP	Anthony Miranda	31,361	19.34
Aksyon	Danilo Tan	6,491	4.00
Margin of victory		73,778	45.51%
Invalid or blank votes		19,125	11.80
Total votes		162,116	100.00
NPC hold			

== Nueva Vizcaya ==
Carlos M. Padilla is the incumbent.

2013 Philippine House of Representatives election at Nueca Vizcaya
Party	Candidate	Votes	%
Nacionalista	Carlos M. Padilla	77,738	57.04
UNA	Luisa Cuaresma	51,313	37.65
Independent	Lawrence Sta. Ana	1,426	1.05
Margin of victory		26,425	19.39%
Invalid or blank votes		5,803	4.26
Total votes		136,280	100.00
Nacionalista hold			

== Quirino ==
Incumbent Dakila Carlo Cua is running unopposed.

2013 Philippine House of Representatives election at Quirino
Party	Candidate	Votes	%
Liberal	Dakila Carlo Cua	47,832	87.33
Invalid or blank votes		6,941	12.67
Total votes		54,773	100.00
Liberal hold			
