= 2010 Philippine House of Representatives elections in Cagayan Valley =

Philippine House of Representatives elections in Cagayan Valley, 2010
- May 10, 2010

10 seats of Cagayan Valley in the House of Representatives
	First party	Second party	Third party
Party	Lakas–Kampi	NPC	Nacionalista
Seats won	5	2	2
Popular vote	445,765	196,912	195,734
Percentage	34.70%	15.33%	15.24%
	Fourth party	Fifth party
Party	Liberal	Bigkis
Seats won	1	0
Popular vote	182,730	169,791
Percentage	14.22%	13.22%
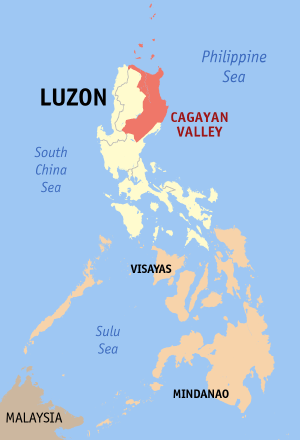
- Location of Cagayan Valley within the country.

Elections were held in Cagayan Valley for seats in the House of Representatives of the Philippines on May 10, 2010.

The candidate with the most votes won that district's seat for the 15th Congress of the Philippines.

== Summary ==
Party	Popular vote	%	Seats won
Lakas–Kampi	445,765	34.70%	5
NPC	196,912	15.33%	2
Nacionalista	195,734	15.24%	1
Liberal	182,730	14.22%	1
Bigkis	169,791	13.22%	0
Aksyon	2,938	0.23%	0
Independent	90,785	7.07%	0
Valid votes	1,284,655	93.78%	10
Invalid votes	85,262	6.22%	
Turnout	1,369,917	74.73%	
Registered voters	1,833,137	100.00%	

== Batanes ==
Carlo Oliver Diasnes is the incumbent.

Candidate	Party	Votes	%
Henedina Abad	Liberal Party	3,076	37.07
Carlo Oliver Diasnes (incumbent)	Lakas–Kampi–CMD	2,988	36.01
Alexius Narag	Independent	2,234	26.92
Total		8,298	100.00
Valid votes		8,298	97.93
Invalid/blank votes		175	2.07
Total votes		8,473	100.00
Liberal Party gain from Lakas–Kampi–CMD			
Source: Commission on Elections

== Cagayan ==
=== 1st District ===
Incumbent Sally Ponce Enrile is not running.

Candidate	Party	Votes	%
Jack Enrile	Nationalist People's Coalition	85,197	56.23
Ignacio Taruc	Liberal Party	61,247	40.42
Joaquin Agatep Jr.	Independent	5,084	3.36
Total		151,528	100.00
Valid votes		151,528	90.44
Invalid/blank votes		16,017	9.56
Total votes		167,545	100.00
Nationalist People's Coalition hold			
Source: Commission on Elections

=== 2nd District ===
Florencio Vargas is the incumbent.

Candidate	Party	Votes	%
Florencio Vargas (incumbent)	Lakas–Kampi–CMD	85,376	73.21
Edgar Lara	Nationalist People's Coalition	28,303	24.27
Lydia Ramos	Aksyon Demokratiko	2,938	2.52
Total		116,617	100.00
Valid votes		116,617	93.10
Invalid/blank votes		8,646	6.90
Total votes		125,263	100.00
Lakas–Kampi–CMD hold			
Source: Commission on Elections

Congressman Florencio Vargas died on July 22, a few days before the 15th Congress convened. The two other congressmen from Cagayan, Juan Ponce Enrile, Jr. and Randolph Ting, then filed a resolution declaring Vargas' seat vacant paving way for a special election. Defeated candidate and former governor Edgar Lara had previously expressed interest in participating if a special election was called, and also said that he expects any member of the Vargas family to run as well. On December 13, Representative Juan Ponce Enrile, Jr. was designated by Speaker Feliciano Belmonte, Jr. as the caretaker of the 2nd district pending the approval of a special election.

The Commission on Elections has set the election on March 12, 2011, Saturday.

=== 3rd District ===
Incumbent Manuel Mamba is term-limited and is not eligible for reelection. He is running for provincial governor, and Francisco Mamba, Jr. will run as his party nominee.

The result of the election is under protest in the House of Representatives Electoral Tribunal.

Candidate	Party	Votes	%
Randolph Ting	Lakas–Kampi–CMD	106,048	64.28
Francisco Mamba Jr.	Liberal Party	58,934	35.72
Total		164,982	100.00
Valid votes		164,982	95.40
Invalid/blank votes		7,962	4.60
Total votes		172,944	100.00
Lakas–Kampi–CMD gain from Liberal Party			
Source: Commission on Elections

== Isabela ==
All candidates under the Lakas-Kampi-CMD banner are originally candidates of the Nationalist People's Coalition, the party the Dy patriarch, the late Governor Faustino Nang Dy Sr. helped establish before his death in 1992(?) and whose sons, notably the elder Dy's successor, Faustino Dy Jr., hold high positions within. They were nominated by the Lakas-Kampi party after the Dy dynasty gave all-out support to the presidential candidacy of former Defense Secretary Gilbert Teodoro Jr., himself a former NPC member.

=== 1st District ===
Incumbent Rodolfo Albano III is not running. He will be the running mate of three-term 3rd District representative Faustino "Bojie" Dy III in their quest to end the six-year rule of incumbent Governor Grace Padaca; his father, former Energy Regulatory Administration Chair and three-term Representative Rodolfo Albano Jr. will run in his stead.

Candidate	Party	Votes	%
Rodolfo Albano Jr.	Lakas–Kampi–CMD	103,938	74.92
Noel Binag	Bigkis Pinoy	34,491	24.86
Stephen Soliven	Independent	299	0.22
Total		138,728	100.00
Valid votes		138,728	91.45
Invalid/blank votes		12,971	8.55
Total votes		151,699	100.00
Lakas–Kampi–CMD hold			
Source: Commission on Elections

=== 2nd District ===
Edwin Uy is the incumbent, and is barred from seeking re-election after serving three terms. He will run for provincial vice governor in tandem with incumbent Governor Grace Padaca, and in turn will field his brother Edgar Uy for the post he is vacating. Edgar Uy will face another Padaca ally, incumbent board member Ana Cristina Go.

The result of the election is under protest in the House of Representatives Electoral Tribunal.

Candidate	Party	Votes	%
Ana Cristina Go	Nacionalista Party	75,045	50.96
Edgar Uy	Bigkis Pinoy	72,207	49.04
Total		147,252	100.00
Valid votes		147,252	92.27
Invalid/blank votes		12,340	7.73
Total votes		159,592	100.00
Nacionalista Party gain from Liberal Party			
Source: Commission on Elections

=== 3rd District ===
Incumbent Faustino Dy III is in his third consecutive term already and is ineligible for reelection; he will run for provincial governor instead. A co-member of the Dy family, Napoleon, is his party's nominee.

Candidate	Party	Votes	%
Napoleon Dy	Lakas–Kampi–CMD	84,395	57.22
Ramon Reyes	Bigkis Pinoy	63,093	42.78
Total		147,488	100.00
Valid votes		147,488	92.94
Invalid/blank votes		11,199	7.06
Total votes		158,687	100.00
Lakas–Kampi–CMD hold			
Source: Commission on Elections

=== 4th District ===
Giorgidi Aggabao is the incumbent.

Candidate	Party	Votes	%
Giorgidi Aggabao (incumbent)	Nationalist People's Coalition	83,412	50.94
Danilo Tan	Independent	78,228	47.78
Nicolas de Guzman Jr.	Independent	2,090	1.28
Total		163,730	100.00
Valid votes		163,730	94.78
Invalid/blank votes		9,021	5.22
Total votes		172,751	100.00
Nationalist People's Coalition hold			
Source: Commission on Elections

== Nueva Vizcaya ==
Carlos M. Padilla is the incumbent.

Candidate	Party	Votes	%
Carlos Padilla (incumbent)	Nacionalista Party	108,316	63.75
Ralph Lantion	Liberal Party	59,473	35.00
Carlito Labitoria	Independent	1,761	1.04
Lawrence Santa Ana	Independent	367	0.22
Total		169,917	100.00
Valid votes		169,917	97.03
Invalid/blank votes		5,201	2.97
Total votes		175,118	100.00
Nacionalista Party hold			
Source: Commission on Elections

== Quirino ==
Incumbent Junie Cua is in his third consecutive term already and is ineligible for reelection; he is running for the provincial governorship instead. His son, governor Dakila Cua is his party's nominee for his seat.

Candidate	Party	Votes	%
Dakila Cua	Lakas–Kampi–CMD	63,020	82.80
Eleazar Balderas	Nacionalista Party	12,373	16.26
Orlando Mina	Independent	722	0.95
Total		76,115	100.00
Valid votes		76,115	97.55
Invalid/blank votes		1,910	2.45
Total votes		78,025	100.00
Lakas–Kampi–CMD hold			
Source: Commission on Elections
