= Neutral zone =

Neutral zone may refer to:

- Neutral zone (territorial entity) or an International zone

== Sports ==
- Neutral zone (cycling), a non-competitive segment of a few miles at the beginning of a bicycle race
- Neutral zone (gridiron football), the region between offensive and defensive sides prior to the snap of the ball on a scrimmage play
- Neutral zone (ice hockey), a zone between the blue lines in ice hockey

== Star Trek ==
- Neutral zone (Star Trek), a buffer zone between the territories of two different powers in the fictional Star Trek universe
- "The Neutral Zone" (Star Trek: The Next Generation), the finale of the first season of Star Trek: The Next Generation

== Other uses ==
- Neutral zone (control theory) or deadband
- Neutral zone (dentistry), where the forces exerted by the muscles of the lips, cheek, and tongue are in balance

== See also ==
- Demilitarized zone
- Neutral axis
- Neutral territory
- No man's land
- Overhead line#Neutral section (phase break) on which electric trains operate but which lacks the overhead lines that power them
- Saudi–Iraqi neutral zone
- Saudi–Kuwaiti neutral zone
