= Cordon sanitaire =

Cordon sanitaire (French pronunciation: [kɔʁdɔ̃ sanitɛʁ]) is French for "sanitary cordon". It may refer to:

- Cordon sanitaire (medicine), a cordon that quarantines an area during an infectious disease outbreak
- Cordon sanitaire (politics), refusal to cooperate with certain political parties
- Cordon sanitaire (international relations), a French foreign policy of containing Soviet and German influence in interwar Europe
- Cordon sanitaire (naval tactic), a naval tactic similar to blockade.
- Externalization (migration), specifically efforts to enlist third countries to prevent asylum seekers from arriving at a border
