= Cordon, Isabela =

Municipality in Isabela, Philippines

Cordon Estella
- Municipality of Cordon
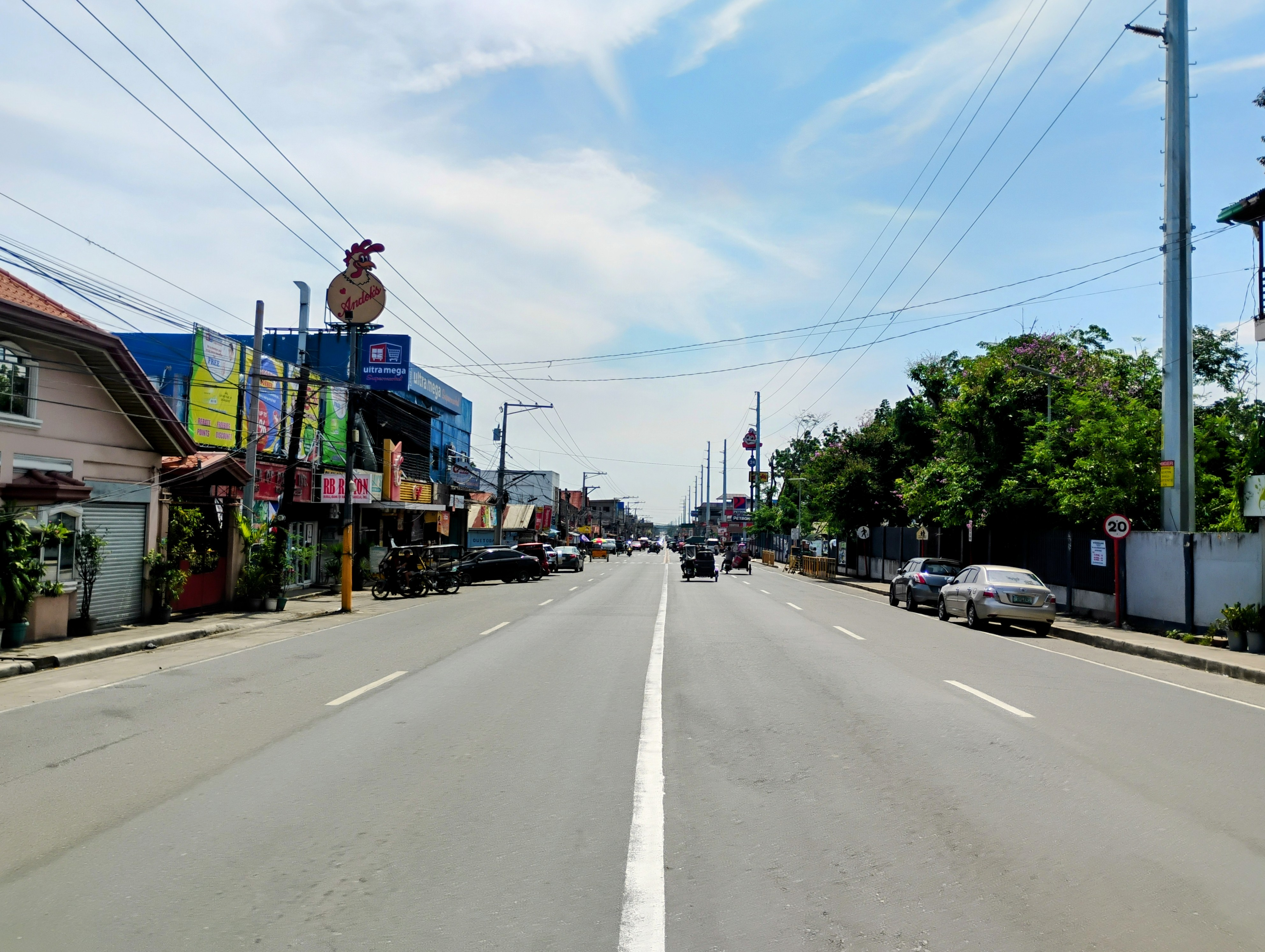
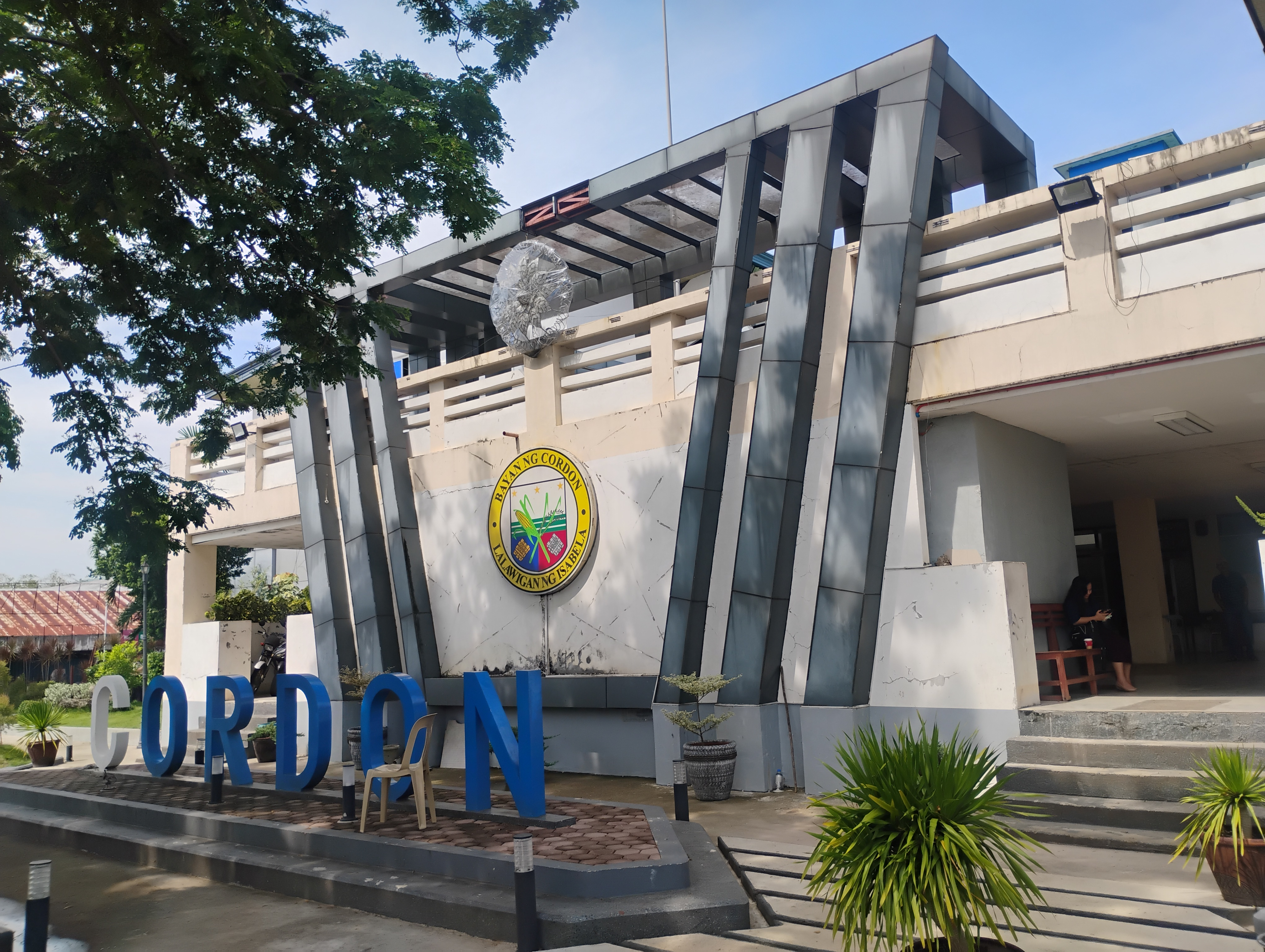
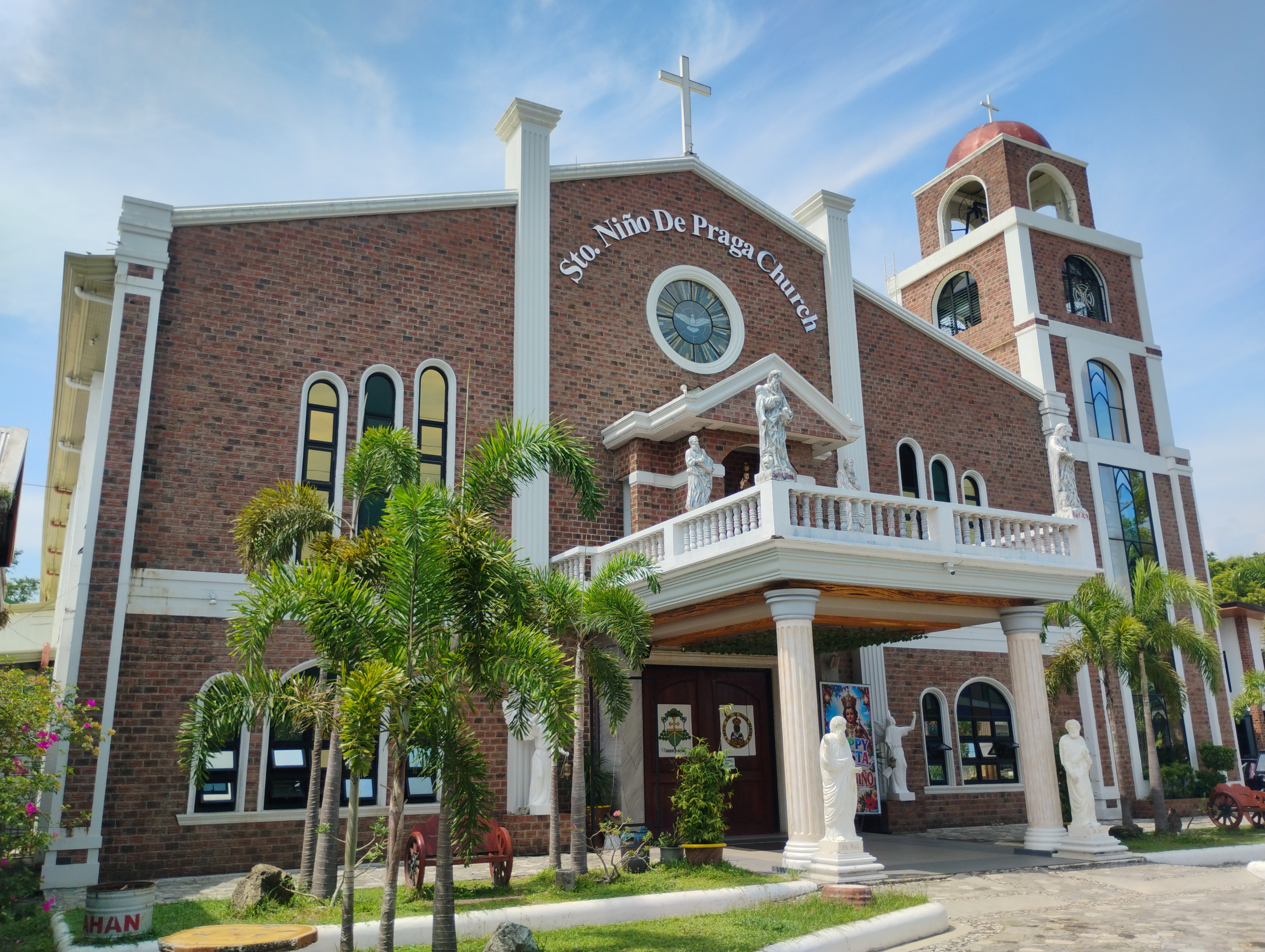
- Maharlika Highway along Cordon Cordon Municipal Hall Santo Niño de Praga Parish Church

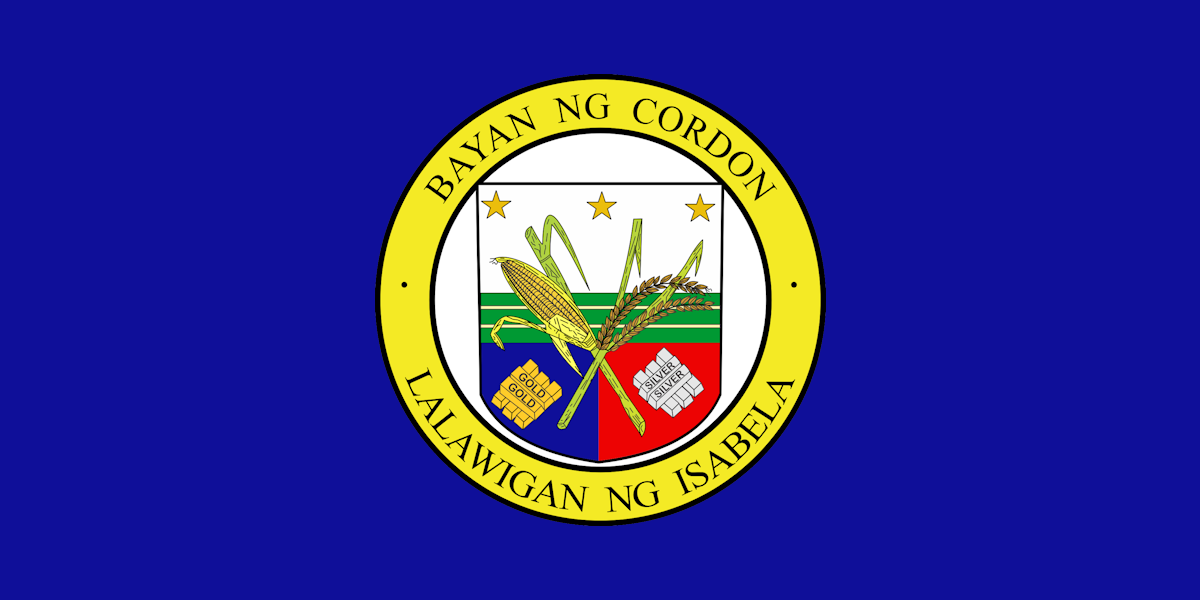
- Flag Seal
- Nickname: Gateway of Isabela
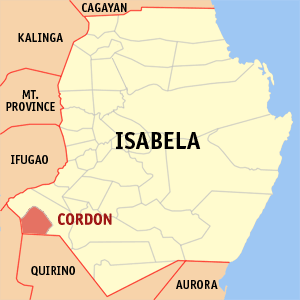
- Map of Isabela with Cordon highlighted
- Interactive map of Cordon
- Location within the Philippines
- Coordinates: 16°40′N 121°27′E
- Country: Philippines
- Region: Cagayan Valley
- Province: Isabela
- District: 4th district
- Founded: 1484
- Barangays: 26 (see Barangays)

Government
  - Type: Sangguniang Bayan
  - Mayor: Florenz M. Zuniega
  - Vice Mayor: Lynn M. Zuniega-Dy
  - Representative: Joseph S. Tan
  - Electorate: 29,546 voters (2025)

Area
  - Total: 144.00 km^{2} (55.60 sq mi)
- Elevation: 138 m (453 ft)
- Highest elevation: 530 m (1,740 ft)
- Lowest elevation: 86 m (282 ft)

Population (2024 census)
  - Total: 46,688
  - Density: 324.22/km^{2} (839.73/sq mi)
  - Households: 11,578

Economy
  - Income class: 1st municipal income class
  - Poverty incidence: 12.96% (2023)
  - Revenue: ₱ 244.6 million (2024)
  - Assets: ₱ 515.1 million (2024)
  - Expenditure: ₱ 224.3 million (2024)
  - Liabilities: ₱ 69.38 million (2024)

Service provider
  - Electricity: Isabela 1 Electric Cooperative (ISELCO 1)
- Time zone: UTC+8 (PST)
- ZIP code: 3312
- PSGC: 0203109000
- IDD : area code: +63 (0)78
- Native languages: Ilocano; Gaddang; Tagalog

Cordon, officially the Municipality of Cordon (Ilocano: Ili ti Cordon; Ibanag: Ili nat Cordon; Gaddang: Ili na Cordon; Tagalog: Bayan ng Cordon), is a municipality in the province of Isabela, Philippines. According to the 2024 census, it has a population of 46,688 people.

Being a town bordered by Santiago City, it became a favored destination for investors. It houses resorts and hotels such as Punta Amelita and Villa Diana.

== History ==
Cordon was originally founded in 1878 as a settlement under the jurisdiction of Carig (now Santiago). It was established as a rest stop for travelers and a military outpost as it lies on the edge of the mountain pass that separates the provinces of Isabela and Nueva Vizcaya. In 1896, it was converted into a town by a Spanish Royal Decree. The origin of the name is unclear, with the first mention of the name dating from 1837 when a Spanish military expedition mentioned the existence of a warehouse called Cordon in the area. Other accounts mention that the place was a quarantine stop for travelers to and from the Cagayan Valley.

=== After Independence ===
On July 18, 1972, a military raid on a New People's Army hideout in Barrio Taringsing led to the discovery of the so-called Taringsing Documents, outlining plans by the CPP-NPA to overthrow the Philippine government by 1973. This became one of the reasons used by President Ferdinand Marcos in declaring Martial Law later in September 1972.

== Geography ==
The present area of Cordon is totally different from its previous area as defined in its charter, the law creating this town, much of the previous Carig town (Modern day Santiago City) territories were annexed to Modern Cordon including the Magat Reservoir Territories (Barangay Taliktik and Barangay Dallao) and the diadi region barangays (San Juan, Aguinaldo, Villamarzo, Camarao, and Rizaluna). It is bordered by Santiago City to the north and east, Diffun, Quirino to the south, and Diadi, Nueva Vizcaya to the west.

The map of Modern Isabela Province and Modern Municipality of Cordon has been changed showing the new boundaries of each towns and cities.

Cordon is situated 87.68 kilometres (54.48 mi) from the provincial capital Ilagan, and 349.83 kilometres (217.37 mi) north of the country's capital Manila.

=== Barangays ===
Cordon is politically subdivided into 26 barangays. Each barangay consists of puroks while some have sitios.

- Anonang (Balitoc)
- Aguinaldo (Rizaluna Este)
- Calimaturod
- Capirpiriwan
- Caquilingan (Ilut) (San Luis)
- Dallao
- Gayong
- Laurel (Centro Norte)
- Magsaysay (Centro Sur Oeste)
- Malapat
- Osmeña (Centro Sur Este)
- Quezon (Centro Norte Este)
- Quirino (Manasin)
- Rizaluna (Rizaluna Oeste)
- Roxas Pob. (Centro Sur)
- Sagat
- San Juan (San Juan Este)
- Taliktik
- Tanggal
- Taringsing
- Turod Norte
- Turod Sur (Turod Sur Este)
- Villamiemban
- Villamarzo
- Camarao
- Wigan

=== Climate ===
Climate data for Cordon, Isabela
Month	Jan	Feb	Mar	Apr	May	Jun	Jul	Aug	Sep	Oct	Nov	Dec	Year
Mean daily maximum °C (°F)	31 (88)	31 (88)	32 (90)	34 (93)	35 (95)	34 (93)	32 (90)	32 (90)	32 (90)	32 (90)	32 (90)	31 (88)	32 (90)
Mean daily minimum °C (°F)	22 (72)	22 (72)	22 (72)	24 (75)	24 (75)	24 (75)	24 (75)	24 (75)	24 (75)	23 (73)	23 (73)	22 (72)	23 (74)
Average precipitation mm (inches)	13.6 (0.54)	10.4 (0.41)	18.2 (0.72)	15.7 (0.62)	178.4 (7.02)	227.9 (8.97)	368 (14.5)	306.6 (12.07)	310.6 (12.23)	215.7 (8.49)	70.3 (2.77)	31.1 (1.22)	1,766.5 (69.56)
Average rainy days	3	2	2	4	14	16	23	21	24	15	10	6	140
Source: World Weather Online (modeled/calculated data, not measured locally)

== Demographics ==
Population census of Cordon

Year	Pop.	±% p.a.
1948	5,686	—
1960	9,097	+3.99%
1970	12,972	+3.61%
1975	15,059	+3.04%
1980	20,994	+6.87%
1990	27,544	+2.75%
1995	30,461	+1.90%

Year	Pop.	±% p.a.
2000	35,519	+3.35%
2007	38,139	+0.99%
2010	40,877	+2.56%
2015	42,926	+0.94%
2020	46,477	+1.69%
2024	46,688	+0.11%

Source: Philippine Statistics Authority

In the 2024 census, the population of Cordon was 46,688 people, with a density of 320 inhabitants per square kilometre or 830 inhabitants per square mile.

== Economy ==
Poverty incidence of Cordon (%)

Source: Philippine Statistics Authority

As a suburb of first class city Santiago, Cordon benefits from rapid growth of commercial demand in the district. Toyota Isabela, the first branch of Japan-based car company in the province, has opened an outlet in Cordon. Some hotels and "stop overs" are also located in Cordon.

== Government ==
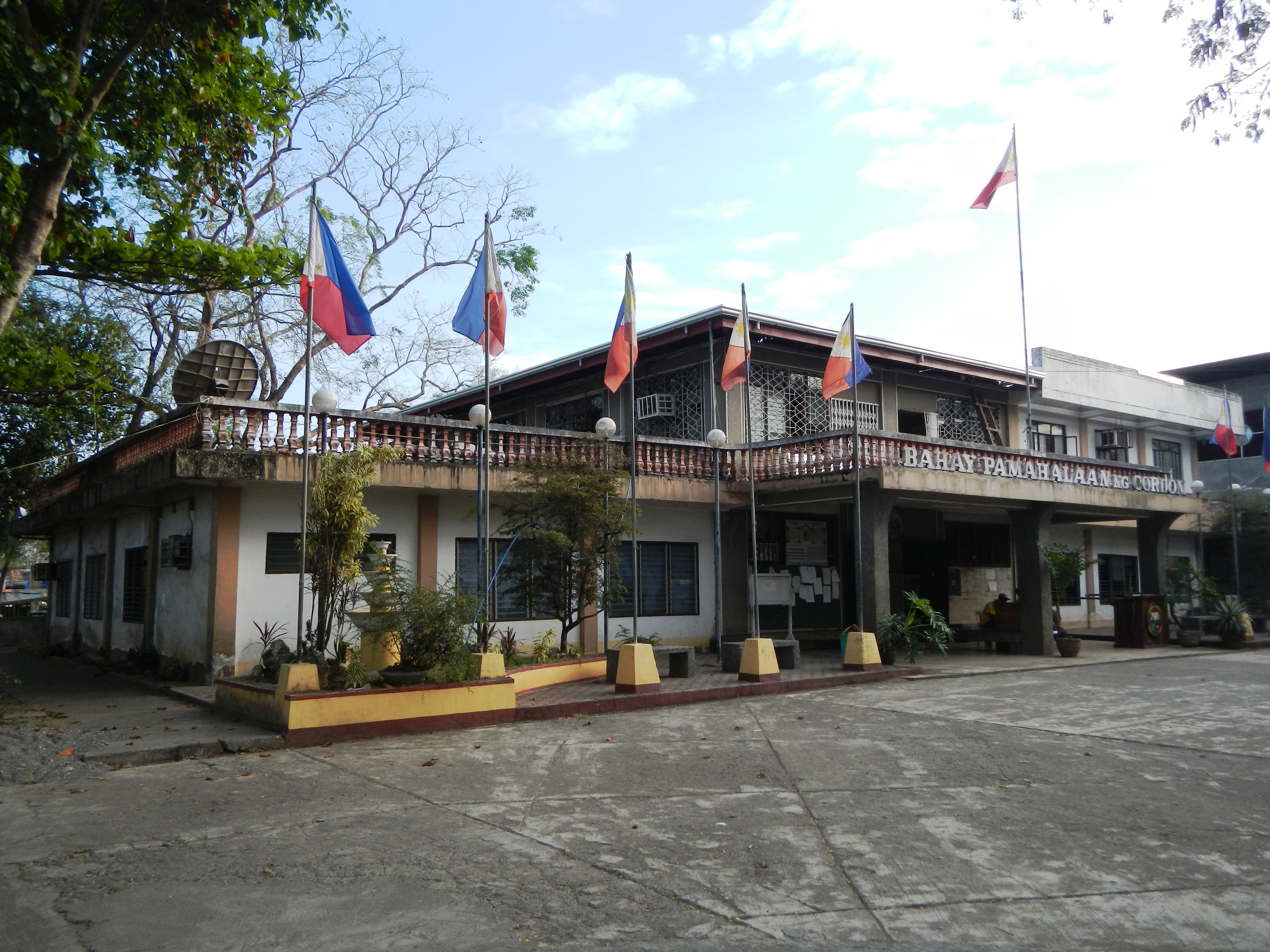
Town Hall facade

=== Local government ===
As a municipality in the province of Isabela, government officials at the provincial and municipal levels are voted by the town. The provincial government has political jurisdiction over most local transactions of the municipal government.

The Municipality of Cordon is governed by a mayor, designated as its local chief executive, and by a municipal council as its legislative body in accordance with the Local Government Code. The mayor, vice mayor, and the municipal councilors are elected directly by the people through an election held every three years.

Barangays are also headed by elected officials: Barangay Captain, Barangay Council, whose members are called Barangay Councilors. The barangays have SK federation which represents the barangay, headed by sK chairperson and whose members are called SK councilors. All officials are also elected every three years.

=== Elected officials ===
Members of the Cordon Municipal Council (2022-2025)
Position	Name
Congressman	Joseph S. Tan
Mayor	Lynn M. Zuniega
Vice-Mayor	Abegail V. Sable
Councilors	Florenz M. Zuniega
Councilors	Jaime R. Queddeng
Councilors	Rene I. Galeng
Councilors	Efren P. Malupeng
Councilors	Rosendo S. Cayaban
Councilors	Ayson J. Villador
Councilors	Charlita J. Mariano
Councilors	Menardo C. Vallejo

=== Congress representations ===
Cordon, belonging to the fourth legislative district of the province of Isabela, currently represented by Hon. Joseph S. Tan.

== Education ==
The Schools Division of Isabela governs the town's public education system. The division office is a field office of the DepEd in Cagayan Valley region. There are two schools district offices govern the public and private elementary and public and private high schools throughout the municipality. Currently, there are two school districts namely:

- Cordon North Schools District
- Cordon South Schools District

=== Primary and elementary schools ===
- Aguinaldo Elementary School
- Amazing Grace Christian School
- Anonang Elementary School
- Camarao Elementary School
- Calimaturod Elementary School
- Capirpiriwan Elementary School
- Cordon Archangel's Montessori School
- Cordon North Central School
- Cordon South Central School (Main)
- Cordon South Central School (Annex)
- Cordon United Methodist Learning School
- Diadi Region High School
- Dallao Elementary School
- Gayong Elementary School
- Kakilingan Elementary School
- Malapat Elementary School
- Rizaluna Elementary School
- Sagat Elementary School
- San Juan Elementary School
- Taringsing Elementary School
- Turod Sur Elementary School
- Villa Marzo Elementary School
- Villa Miemban Elementary School

=== Secondary schools ===
- Cagasat National High School (Main)
- Cagasat High School-Magsaysay (Annex)
- Doña Josefa E. Marcos High School
- Taliktik Integrated School
- St. John Berchmans High School Incorporated
- Wigan Integrated School
