= San Isidro, Isabela =

Municipality in Isabela, Philippines

San Isidro
- Municipality
- Municipality of San Isidro
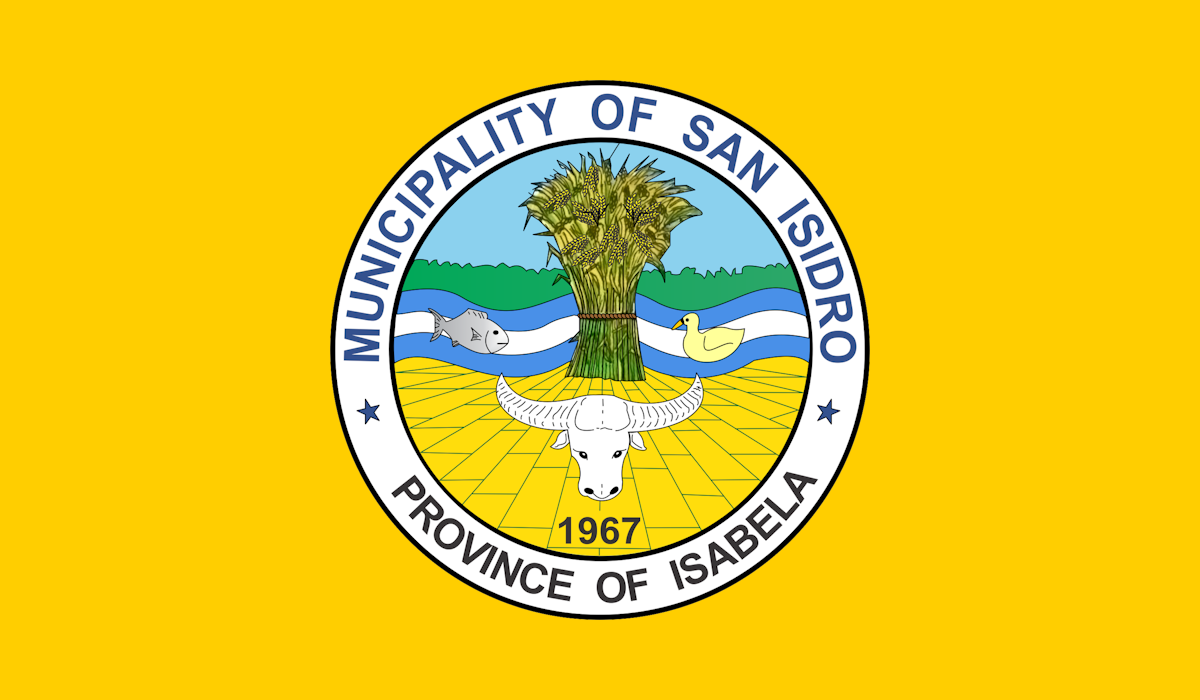
- Flag Seal

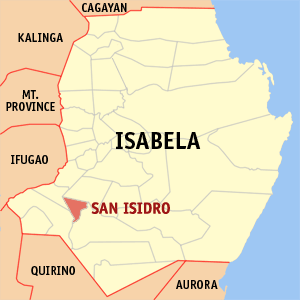
- Map of Isabela with San Isidro highlighted
- Interactive map of San Isidro
- Location within the Philippines
- Coordinates: 16°52′N 121°46′E
- Country: Philippines
- Region: Cagayan Valley
- Province: Isabela
- District: 6th district
- Founded: June 17, 1967
- Barangays: 13 (see Barangays)

Government
  - Type: Sangguniang Bayan
  - Mayor: Vilmer B. Bravo
  - Vice Mayor: Leonardo A. Tumamao
  - Representative: Faustino A. Dy V
  - Electorate: 16,761 voters (2025)

Area
  - Total: 71.90 km^{2} (27.76 sq mi)
- Elevation: 54 m (177 ft)
- Highest elevation: 188 m (617 ft)
- Lowest elevation: 23 m (75 ft)

Population (2024 census)
  - Total: 27,326
  - Density: 380.1/km^{2} (984.3/sq mi)
  - Households: 6,774

Economy
  - Income class: 3rd municipal income class
  - Poverty incidence: 12% (2023)
  - Revenue: ₱ 141.7 million (2024)
  - Assets: ₱ 860.2 million (2024)
  - Expenditure: ₱ 122.3 million (2024)
  - Liabilities: ₱ 334.1 million (2024)

Service provider
  - Electricity: Isabela 1 Electric Cooperative (ISELCO 1)
- Time zone: UTC+8 (PST)
- ZIP code: 3310
- PSGC: 0203129000
- IDD : area code: +63 (0)78
- Native languages: Ilocano; Gaddang; Tagalog
- Website: www.sanisidro-isabela.gov.ph

San Isidro, officially the Municipality of San Isidro (Ilocano: Ili ti San Isidro; Tagalog: Bayan ng San Isidro), is a municipality in the province of Isabela, Philippines. According to the 2024 census, it has a population of 27,326 people.

== History ==
=== Early history ===
History records that the early inhabitants of San Isidro were the Yogads, the natives of Echague. However, Ilokanos later settled in Camarag, making the Yogad-Ilokano groups the dominant population in the town. The Ilokanos came from Ilocos Sur and Ilocos Norte, persuaded by Antonio Mangadap, a well-traveled leader who journeyed through Northern Luzon. Mangadap’s son, Jordan, who became the leader of Camarag, served as gobernadorcillo and judge. Other members of the Mangadap clan also held leadership positions in Camarag, including Alfredo, the father of Mayor Proceso Mangadap.

=== Spanish colonial era ===
In the 18th century, when names such as Echague and San Isidro were not yet known, Camarag was already a popular place. The name Camarag was derived from the Camarag trees abundant in the area during the Spanish period in 1710. A significant Roman Catholic Church and a road connecting Camarag to other places like Santiago and Nueva Vizcaya were constructed, and the ruins of these landmarks still exist today. In 1776, Camarag became a town of the Province of Cagayan, the lone province in the Cagayan Valley at that time. However, in 1839, Camarag became the capital of Nueva Vizcaya when the province was created. Seventeen years later, in 1856, it became a town of Isabela, along with others such as Cabagan, Tumauini, Ilagan, Gamu, Angadanan, Carig (present-day Santiago), Palanan, Alamo, Gaddang, Mayoyao, Brengiones, and Catalaganes.

Camarag remained a town for many years until the town site was transferred to Katuray, a location near the Cagayan River and the present site of Echague. The transfer occurred in 1863, and Katuray was renamed Echague in honor of General Rafael de Echague, the then-governor general of the country. The move was motivated by Katuray's proximity to the Cagayan River, the main transport artery, and the commercial center in the Cagayan Valley. Additionally, Katuray was surrounded by barangays producing high-quality tobacco and had fertile soil ideal for agriculture. With the town site transfer to Katuray in 1863, Camarag became a barrio of Echague. This remained the case until 1967 when San Isidro was established as a separate municipality, 104 years later. Thus, Camarag can be seen as the "mother" of Echague, which in turn became the "mother" of San Isidro.

The opening of the San Jose-Santa Fee road in the 1920s facilitated the movement of people from Ilocos and Central Luzon to the Cagayan Valley, with many settling in Camarag. Leaders among these new settlers included Benito Tumamao, Vicente Ramos, Ramon Felipe, Tomas Galapia, and Alejandro Viloria. The influx of people into Camarag led to a population increase, which in turn boosted trade and commerce.

=== Philippine independence ===
On June 17, 1967, Republic Act 5139, authored by Representative Melanio Singson, became law, creating the municipality of San Isidro. This law separated San Isidro from the municipality of Echague, its "mother town" since 1863. The town was officially inaugurated on January 1, 1968. The initiative to create San Isidro began in 1966 when Barangay Captain Guillermo Mariano and Municipal Councilor Ricardo Netro, both residents of San Isidro along with former Echague Mayor Patricio Ramos, then a Board Member of Isabela, petitioned Representative Singson to introduce a bill in the Philippine Congress to establish the new town of San Isidro.

Singson initially opposed the creation of a new town due to the challenges of managing a new municipality, logistical constraints, and the limited area of the proposed municipality. However, he eventually relented to the group's persistence and enthusiasm and filed the bill in Congress. It was expected that the town site would be in Camarag due to its historical importance and popularity. However, since Camarag was located on the boundary of Echague, the site was conveniently assigned to its current location, between Barangay Gomez and Barangay Rizal. The municipality has had ten political administrations since its establishment in 1967.

Today, while the Ilokanos remain the dominant group in San Isidro, the municipality is home to a diverse population. Tagalogs, Pangasinense, Ibanags, Gaddangs, and others have made San Isidro their place of residence and commerce.

== Geography ==
San Isidro is situated 62.69 kilometres (38.95 mi) from the provincial capital Ilagan, and 374.88 kilometres (232.94 mi) from the country's capital city of Manila.

=== Barangays ===
San Isidro is politically subdivided into 13 barangays. Each barangay consists of puroks while some have sitios.

- Camarag
- Cebu
- Gomez (Poblacion)
- Gud
- Nagbukel
- Patanad
- Quezon
- Ramos East
- Ramos West
- Rizal East
- Rizal West
- Victoria (Doña Paulina)
- Villaflor

=== Climate ===
Climate data for San Isidro, Isabela
Month	Jan	Feb	Mar	Apr	May	Jun	Jul	Aug	Sep	Oct	Nov	Dec	Year
Mean daily maximum °C (°F)	29 (84)	30 (86)	32 (90)	35 (95)	35 (95)	35 (95)	34 (93)	33 (91)	32 (90)	31 (88)	30 (86)	28 (82)	32 (90)
Mean daily minimum °C (°F)	19 (66)	20 (68)	21 (70)	23 (73)	23 (73)	24 (75)	23 (73)	23 (73)	23 (73)	22 (72)	21 (70)	20 (68)	22 (71)
Average precipitation mm (inches)	31.2 (1.23)	23 (0.9)	27.7 (1.09)	28.1 (1.11)	113.5 (4.47)	141.4 (5.57)	176.4 (6.94)	236.6 (9.31)	224.9 (8.85)	247.7 (9.75)	222.9 (8.78)	178 (7.0)	1,651.4 (65)
Average rainy days	10	6	5	5	13	12	15	15	15	17	16	15	144
Source: World Weather Online

== Demographics ==
Population census of San Isidro
Year	Pop.	±% p.a.
1970	8,384	—
1975	9,737	+3.05%
1980	11,527	+3.43%
1990	14,444	+2.28%
1995	16,043	+1.99%
2000	18,603	+3.22%
2007	21,387	+1.94%
2010	22,758	+2.29%
2015	24,861	+1.70%
2020	27,044	+1.79%
2024	27,326	+0.25%
Source: Philippine Statistics Authority

In the 2024 census, the population of San Isidro was 27,326 people, with a density of 380 inhabitants per square kilometre or 980 inhabitants per square mile.

== Economy ==
Poverty incidence of San Isidro (%)

Source: Philippine Statistics Authority

== Government ==
=== Local government ===
As a municipality in the Province of Isabela, government officials at the provincial and municipal levels are voted by the town. The provincial government has political jurisdiction over most local transactions of the municipal government.

The Municipality of San Isidro is governed by a mayor, designated as its local chief executive, and by a municipal council as its legislative body in accordance with the Local Government Code. The mayor, vice mayor, and the municipal councilors are elected directly through polls held every three years.

Barangays are also headed by elected officials: Barangay Captain, Barangay Council, whose members are called Barangay Councilors. The barangays have SK federation which represents the barangay, headed by SK chairperson and whose members are called SK councilors. All officials are also elected every three years.

=== Elected officials ===
Members of the San Isidro Municipal Council (2022-2025)
Position	Name
District Representative	Faustino A. Dy V
Municipal Mayor	Vilmer B. Bravo
Municipal Vice-Mayor	Leonardo A. Tumamao
Municipal Councilors	Alberto J. Sario
Municipal Councilors	Christine V. Bravo
Municipal Councilors	Guill Marc Mariano
Municipal Councilors	Levie D. Lomboy
Municipal Councilors	Sharon S. Gervacio
Municipal Councilors	Jerry Urbano
Municipal Councilors	Ronald R. Sta. Maria
Municipal Councilors	Lovelie M. Ulep

=== Congress representation ===
San Isidro, belonging to the sixth legislative district of the province of Isabela, currently represented by Hon. Faustino A. Dy V.

== Education ==
The Schools Division of Isabela governs the town's public education system. The division office is a field office of the DepEd in Cagayan Valley region. The San Isidro Schools District Office governs all public and private elementary and high schools throughout the municipality.

=== Primary and elementary schools ===
- Alpha Kiddie Learning Center
- Camarag Elementary School
- Capayacan Elementary School
- Dona Paulina Elementary School
- Gud Elementary School
- Nagbukel Elementary School
- Patanad Elementary School
- Quezon Elementary School
- Ramos Elementary School
- Ramos West Elementary School
- San Isidro East Central School
- San Isidro United Methodist School
- San Isidro West Central School
- Villaflor Elementary School
- Zion Methodist Learning Center

=== Secondary schools ===
- Cebu Integrated School
- Manuel L. Quezon National High School
- San Isidro National High School
