= Joseph Tan (politician) =

Filipino civil engineer and politician (born 1963)

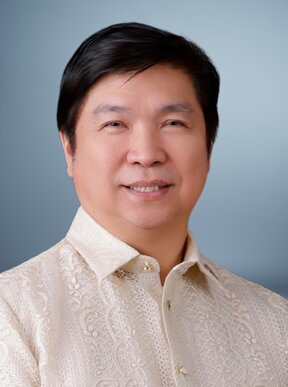
- Official portrait, 2025

Member of the House of Representatives from Isabela’s 4th District
- Incumbent
- Assumed office June 30, 2022
- Preceded by: Alyssa Sheena Tan

26th Mayor of Santiago, Isabela
- In office June 30, 2013 – June 30, 2022
- Vice Mayor: Marcelino Cabucana Jr. (2013–2016); Alvin Abaya (2016–2022)
- Preceded by: Amelita Navarro
- Succeeded by: Alyssa Sheena Tan

Personal details
- Born: Joseph Salvador Tan; October 21, 1963 (age 62) Santiago, Isabela, Philippines
- Party: PFP (2026–present)
- Other political affiliations: Lakas (2022–2026); PDP–Laban (2018–2022); Liberal (until 2018)
- Spouse: Genalyn Marquez
- Relatives: Alyssa Sheena Tan (niece)
- Education: Mapúa Institute of Technology (BS)
- Occupation: Politician, civil engineer

Joseph "Bespren" Salvador Tan (born October 21, 1963) is a Filipino civil engineer and politician. He is currently serving as representative of the 4th District of Isabela in the House of Representatives of the Philippines since 2022. He served as 26th mayor of Santiago, Isabela from 2013 to 2019.

== Early life and education ==
Tan was born on October 21, 1963 in Santiago, Isabela, to Tan Chai and Honorata Salvador.

He studied Santiago Cultural Institute for his primary education. He studied Iloilo Cultural High School for his secondary education. He finished Bachelor of Science in civil engineering at the Mapúa Institute of Technology.

== Political career ==
=== Mayor of Santiago, Isabela (2013–2022) ===
In 2013, Tan was elected as mayor of Santiago, Isabela where he served for three consecutive terms.

=== House of Representatives (2022–present) ===
In 2022, Tan was elected as representative for fourth district of Isabela.

== Personal life ==
Tan is married to Genalyn Marquez.

His niece Alyssa Sheena Tan, had also served as representative of the fourth district of Isabela from 2019 to 2022 and current mayor of Santiago, Isabela since 2022.

== Electoral history ==
Electoral history of Joseph Tan
Year	Office	Party	Votes received				Result
Year	Office	Party	Total	%	P.	Swing	Result
2013	Mayor of Santiago, Isabela	Liberal	27,350	—N/a	1st	—N/a	Won
2016	Mayor of Santiago, Isabela	Liberal	38,565	—N/a	1st	—N/a	Won
2019	Mayor of Santiago, Isabela	PDP–Laban	40,747	—N/a	1st	—N/a	Won
2022	Representative (Isabela–4th)	PDP–Laban	106,651	74.90%	1st	—N/a	Won
2025	Representative (Isabela–4th)	Lakas	112,993	73.40%	1st	—N/a	Won
