= Results of the 2025 Philippine House of Representatives elections by congressional district =

- May 12, 2025
- All 318 seats to the House of Representatives of the Philippines; 160 seats needed for a majority

The following are the results of the 2025 Philippine House of Representatives elections by congressional district.

== Abra ==
Candidate	Party	Votes	%
Joseph Sto. Niño B. Bernos	Lakas–CMD	140,446	85.10
Mila A. Valera	Asenso Abrenio	23,308	14.12
Derdrei Roce L. Ifurung	Aksyon Demokratiko	1,285	0.78
Total		165,039	100.00

== Agusan del Norte ==
=== 1st District ===
Candidate	Party	Votes	%
Dale Corvera	Lakas–CMD	177,431	100.00
Total		177,431	100.00

== Agusan del Sur ==
=== 1st District ===
Candidate	Party	Votes	%
Alfelito M. Bascug	National Unity Party	110,340	100.00
Total		110,340	100.00

=== 2nd District ===
Candidate	Party	Votes	%
Adolph Edward G. Plaza	National Unity Party	130,965	100.00
Total		130,965	100.00

== Aklan ==
=== 1st District ===
Candidate	Party	Votes	%
Jesus R. Marquez	Nationalist People's Coalition	88,054	53.91
Rodell R. Ramos	Aksyon Demokratiko	75,286	46.09
Total		163,340	100.00

=== 2nd District ===
Candidate	Party	Votes	%
Florencio Miraflores	Nationalist People's Coalition	88,795	50.82
Teodorico Haresco Jr.	Nacionalista Party	85,253	48.79
Felicisimo Y. Tanumtanum Jr	Independent	685	0.39
Total		174,733	100.00

== Albay ==
=== 1st District ===
Candidate	Party	Votes	%
Cielo Krisel B. Lagman-Luistro	Liberal Party	128,871	54.48
Raul Angelo D. Bongalon	Lakas–CMD	107,656	45.52
Total		236,527	100.00

=== 2nd District ===
Candidate	Party	Votes	%
Carlos A. Loria	PDP–Laban	143,436	50.58
Christopher Co	Lakas–CMD	140,126	49.42
Total		283,562	100.00

=== 3rd District ===
Candidate	Party	Votes	%
Raymond Adrian E. Salceda	Lakas–CMD	144,693	50.95
Fernando Cabredo	National Unity Party	139,308	49.05
Total		284,001	100.00

== Antipolo ==
=== 1st District ===
Candidate	Party	Votes	%
Ronaldo Puno	National Unity Party	119,885	87.30
Manuel C. Relorcasa	Independent	9,113	6.64
Sonia L. Ampo	Independent	8,332	6.07
Total		137,330	100.00

=== 2nd District ===
Candidate	Party	Votes	%
Romeo Acop	National Unity Party	131,925	100.00
Total		131,925	100.00

== Antique ==
Candidate	Party	Votes	%
Antonio Agapito B. Legarda Jr	Nationalist People's Coalition	210,491	63.33
Rhodora Cadiao	National Unity Party	120,203	36.16
Christopher B. Abiog	Partido para sa Demokratikong Reporma	1,002	0.30
Remigio V. Petinglay	Independent	690	0.21
Total		332,386	100.00

== Apayao ==
Candidate	Party	Votes	%
Eleanor Bulut Begtang	Nationalist People's Coalition	58,041	100.00
Total		58,041	100.00

== Aurora ==
Candidate	Party	Votes	%
Rommel T. Angara	Laban ng Demokratikong Pilipino	102,615	100.00
Total		102,615	100.00

== Bacolod ==
Candidate	Party	Votes	%
Alfredo Abelardo B. Benitez	Independent	164,145	56.96
Evelio Leonardia	Nacionalista Party	119,431	41.45
Eduardo B. Gulmatico	Independent	1,671	0.58
Roger T. Abanid	Independent	1,513	0.53
Romy G. Gustilo	Independent	1,394	0.48
Total		288,154	100.00

== Baguio ==
Candidate	Party	Votes	%
Mauricio Domogan	Independent	45,767	35.68
Isabelo B. Cosalan Jr.	Partido Federal ng Pilipinas	32,690	25.49
Soledad J. Go	Lakas–CMD	20,149	15.71
Nicasio M. Aliping Jr.	Independent	17,551	13.68
Gladys A. Vergara	Nationalist People's Coalition	10,624	8.28
Francis Rae G. Camtugan II	Independent	1,258	0.98
Owen Jacques V. Demoni	Independent	228	0.18
Total		128,267	100.00

== Basilan ==
Candidate	Party	Votes	%
Yusop Alano	Partido Federal ng Pilipinas	131,501	56.51
Hanie A. Bud	Liberal Party	101,206	43.49
Total		232,707	100.00

== Bataan ==
=== 1st District ===
Candidate	Party	Votes	%
Antonino Roman III	Lakas–CMD	114,677	100.00
Total		114,677	100.00

=== 2nd District ===
Candidate	Party	Votes	%
Albert Garcia	National Unity Party	149,614	100.00
Total		149,614	100.00

=== 3rd District ===
Candidate	Party	Votes	%
Maria Angela Garcia	National Unity Party	144,517	87.51
Ernesto A. Manalo	Independent	20,627	12.49
Total		165,144	100.00

== Batanes ==
Candidate	Party	Votes	%
Ciriaco Gato Jr.	Nationalist People's Coalition	7,380	66.10
Marilou Cayco	Partido Federal ng Pilipinas	3,785	33.90
Total		11,165	100.00

== Batangas ==
=== 1st District ===
Candidate	Party	Votes	%
Leandro Antonio L. Leviste	Independent	268,764	74.58
Eric Buhain	Nacionalista Party	91,588	25.42
Total		360,352	100.00

=== 2nd District ===
Candidate	Party	Votes	%
Gerville Luistro	Lakas–CMD	109,478	62.18
Raneo Abu	Nacionalista Party	66,583	37.82
Total		176,061	100.00

=== 3rd District ===
Candidate	Party	Votes	%
King George Leandro Antonio V. Collantes	Nationalist People's Coalition	244,340	61.39
Jose Antonio S. Leviste II	Independent	143,751	36.12
Nestor L. Burgos	Independent	9,932	2.50
Total		398,023	100.00

=== 4th District ===
Candidate	Party	Votes	%
Amado Carlos A. Bolilia IV	Nacionalista Party	142,884	52.14
Jonas Patrick M. Gozos	Independent	126,636	46.21
Ralph A. Umali	Lakas–CMD	4,527	1.65
Total		274,047	100.00

=== 5th District ===
Candidate	Party	Votes	%
Beverley Rose A. Dimacuha-Mariño	Nacionalista Party	156,049	87.30
Carlito D. Bisa	Makabayan	22,698	12.70
Total		178,747	100.00

=== 6th District ===
Candidate	Party	Votes	%
Ryan Christian S. Recto	Nacionalista Party	92,823	45.94
Bernadette P. Sabili	Independent	72,976	36.11
Mario L. Panganiban	Partido Federal ng Pilipinas	20,872	10.33
Rodel G. Lacorte	Independent	15,398	7.62
Total		202,069	100.00

== Benguet ==
Candidate	Party	Votes	%
Eric Yap	Lakas–CMD	144,093	69.43
Ericson L. Felipe	Partido Federal ng Pilipinas	62,371	30.05
Jerome E. Wakat	Independent	765	0.37
Juanito A. Siddayao II	Independent	312	0.15
Total		207,541	100.00

== Biliran ==
Candidate	Party	Votes	%
Gerardo Espina Jr.	Lakas–CMD	76,884	100.00
Total		76,884	100.00

== Biñan ==
Candidate	Party	Votes	%
Walfredo R. Dimaguila Jr	Lakas–CMD	102,049	62.62
Michael Gerard Thomas P. Yatco	Partido Federal ng Pilipinas	60,922	37.38
Total		162,971	100.00

== Bohol ==
=== 1st District ===
Candidate	Party	Votes	%
John Geesnell Yap	Laban ng Demokratikong Pilipino	130,661	46.84
Edgar Chatto	National Unity Party	105,187	37.71
Jordan Guiseppe M. Pizarras	Aksyon Demokratiko	41,841	15.00
Marybelle de la Serna	Independent	1,284	0.46
Total		278,973	100.00

=== 2nd District ===
Candidate	Party	Votes	%
Maria Vanessa C. Cadorna-Aumentado	Lakas–CMD	187,719	78.86
Modesto G. Membreve	Liberal Party	50,308	21.14
Total		238,027	100.00

=== 3rd District ===
Candidate	Party	Votes	%
Kristine Alexie T. Besas-Tutor	Lakas–CMD	184,280	72.23
Mc Aldous C. Castañares	Liberal Party	70,849	27.77
Total		255,129	100.00

== Bukidnon ==
=== 1st District ===
Candidate	Party	Votes	%
Jose Manuel Alba	Lakas–CMD	101,011	55.25
Jose Earl L. Navarro	Partido Federal ng Pilipinas	72,819	39.83
Juan Romeo Nereus O. Acosta	Independent	8,988	4.92
Total		182,818	100.00

=== 2nd District ===
Candidate	Party	Votes	%
Jonathan Keith Flores	Lakas–CMD	158,115	83.47
Bernardo C. Mendoza	Independent	31,313	16.53
Total		189,428	100.00

=== 3rd District ===
Candidate	Party	Votes	%
Audrey Kay A. Tan-Zubiri	Partido Federal ng Pilipinas	225,970	93.88
Jerly L. Areja	Aksyon Demokratiko	12,987	5.40
Mertrobio B. Valledor III	Independent	1,755	0.73
Total		240,712	100.00

=== 4th District ===
Candidate	Party	Votes	%
Laarni Roque	Nacionalista Party	76,663	52.23
Dante L. Dangallo	Independent	65,940	44.92
Jenson L. Pamisa	Independent	4,190	2.85
Total		146,793	100.00

== Bulacan ==
=== 1st District ===
Candidate	Party	Votes	%
Danilo A. Domingo	National Unity Party	283,905	80.50
Allan P. Andan	Aksyon Demokratiko	64,753	18.36
Joselito D. Pinlac	Independent	4,035	1.14
Total		352,693	100.00

=== 2nd District ===
Candidate	Party	Votes	%
Augustina Dominique C. Pancho	National Unity Party	167,236	94.25
Jaime E. Villafuerte	Independent	10,195	5.75
Total		177,431	100.00

=== 3rd District ===
Candidate	Party	Votes	%
Mark Cholo I. Violago	Lakas–CMD	146,672	60.51
Victor Anthony S. Silverio	National Unity Party	94,631	39.04
John Gilbert V. Agojo	Independent	1,077	0.44
Total		242,380	100.00

=== 4th District ===
Candidate	Party	Votes	%
Linabelle Villarica	Partido Federal ng Pilipinas	155,351	70.64
Andre Favian D. Santos	National Unity Party	43,012	19.56
Abelardo B. Bordador	Independent	14,611	6.64
Demetrio G. Bautista	Independent	4,113	1.87
Ferdinand P. Victolero	Independent	1,441	0.66
Ernesto M. Padernos	Independent	1,389	0.63
Total		219,917	100.00

=== 5th District ===
Candidate	Party	Votes	%
Agatha Paula A. Cruz-Reyes	Lakas–CMD	188,973	85.11
Victor F. Fernando	Independent	33,051	14.89
Total		222,024	100.00

=== 6th District ===
Candidate	Party	Votes	%
Salvador Pleyto	Lakas–CMD	164,503	100.00
Jad T. Racal (disqualified)	Partido Federal ng Pilipinas	0	0.00
Total		164,503	100.00

== Butuan City ==
Candidate	Party	Votes	%
Jose Aquino II	Lakas–CMD	107,974	100.00
Total		107,974	100.00

== Cagayan ==
=== 1st District ===
Candidate	Party	Votes	%
Ramon C. Nolasco Jr	Lakas–CMD	127,434	58.27
Florante C. Pascual	Nacionalista Party	91,256	41.73
Total		218,690	100.00

=== 2nd District ===
Candidate	Party	Votes	%
Baby Aline Vargas-Alfonso	Lakas–CMD	100,692	58.68
Harry L. Florida	Nacionalista Party	63,927	37.25
Edgar R. Lara	Nationalist People's Coalition	6,982	4.07
Total		171,601	100.00

=== 3rd District ===
Candidate	Party	Votes	%
Joseph Lara	Lakas–CMD	144,276	60.42
Randolph Ting	National Unity Party	94,508	39.58
Total		238,784	100.00

== Cagayan de Oro ==
=== 1st District ===
Candidate	Party	Votes	%
Lordan Suan	Lakas–CMD	88,526	50.99
Raineir Joaquin V. Uy	Aksyon Demokratiko	85,099	49.01
Total		173,625	100.00

=== 2nd District ===
Candidate	Party	Votes	%
Rufus Rodriguez	Centrist Democratic Party of the Philippines	127,646	94.54
Besavilla C. Morales	Independent	7,369	5.46
Total		135,015	100.00

== Calamba ==
Candidate	Party	Votes	%
Charisse Anne Hernandez	Lakas–CMD	167,282	66.42
Joaquin M. Chipeco Jr.	Nacionalista Party	39,293	15.60
Saturnino J. Lajara	Partido Federal ng Pilipinas	38,926	15.46
Eugiene Z. Salom	AKAY National Political Party	6,356	2.52
Total		251,857	100.00

== Caloocan ==
=== 1st District ===
Candidate	Party	Votes	%
Oscar G. Malapitan	Nacionalista Party	198,244	71.79
Reynaldo O. Malonzo	Katipunan ng Nagkakaisang Pilipino	69,298	25.10
Johram C. Alama	Independent	8,596	3.11
Total		276,138	100.00

=== 2nd District ===
Candidate	Party	Votes	%
Edgar Erice	Liberal Party	105,363	58.19
Mary Mitzi L. Cajayon-Uy	Lakas–CMD	75,719	41.81
Total		181,082	100.00

=== 3rd District ===
Candidate	Party	Votes	%
Dean Asistio	Lakas–CMD	93,708	100.00
Total		93,708	100.00

== Camarines Norte ==
=== 1st District ===
Candidate	Party	Votes	%
Josefina Tallado	Lakas–CMD	79,781	50.30
Catherine Barcelona-Reyes	Partido Federal ng Pilipinas	78,838	49.70
Total		158,619	100.00

=== 2nd District ===
Candidate	Party	Votes	%
Rosemarie Panotes	Lakas–CMD	122,393	77.24
Joseph Christopher M. Panotes	Nationalist People's Coalition	33,828	21.35
Pedro Emmanuel R. Ferrer	Independent	2,239	1.41
Total		158,460	100.00

== Camarines Sur ==
=== 1st District ===
Candidate	Party	Votes	%
Tsuyoshi Anthony G. Horibata	National Unity Party	66,522	57.32
Thaddeus A. Ramos	Nationalist People's Coalition	49,532	42.68
Total		116,054	100.00

=== 2nd District ===
Candidate	Party	Votes	%
Vincenzo Renato Luigi R. Villafuerte	National Unity Party	107,445	63.72
Fermin M. Mabulo	Nationalist People's Coalition	61,169	36.28
Total		168,614	100.00

=== 3rd District ===
Candidate	Party	Votes	%
Nelson Legacion	Lakas–CMD	112,088	43.43
Ernesto Raoul V. Magtuto Jr	National Unity Party	108,444	42.02
Noel N. de Luna	Kusog Bikolandia	33,789	13.09
Juan Agapito M. Tria II	Independent	2,323	0.90
Jarrell A. Losa	Independent	930	0.36
Salome S. Togñi	Independent	526	0.20
Total		258,100	100.00

=== 4th District ===
Candidate	Party	Votes	%
Arnulf Bryan Fuentebella	Nationalist People's Coalition	144,731	56.11
Marco Gabriel I. Gumabao	National Unity Party	113,229	43.89
Total		257,960	100.00

=== 5th District ===
Candidate	Party	Votes	%
Miguel Luis Villafuerte	National Unity Party	192,182	78.43
Philip Paul R. Fortuno	Nationalist People's Coalition	52,850	21.57
Total		245,032	100.00

== Camiguin ==
Candidate	Party	Votes	%
Jurdin Jesus Romualdo	Lakas–CMD	39,864	66.91
Paul Y. Rodriguez	Independent	19,717	33.09
Total		59,581	100.00

== Capiz ==
=== 1st District ===
Candidate	Party	Votes	%
Ivan Howard A. Guintu	Independent	131,545	54.63
Paolo Gerardo Z. Roxas	One Capiz	109,249	45.37
Total		240,794	100.00

=== 2nd District ===
Candidate	Party	Votes	%
Jane Castro	Lakas–CMD	157,199	100.00
Total		157,199	100.00

== Catanduanes ==
Candidate	Party	Votes	%
Eulogio Rodriguez	Partido Federal ng Pilipinas	61,575	37.06
Samuel V. Laynes	Lakas–CMD	60,598	36.47
Jan Ferdinand A. Alberto	Independent	42,161	25.38
Cedric H. Sanchez	Independent	1,325	0.80
Eugenio F. Salimao Jr	Independent	484	0.29
Total		166,143	100.00

== Cavite ==
=== 1st District ===
Candidate	Party	Votes	%
Ramon Jolo H. Bautista Revilla III	Lakas–CMD	147,263	77.93
Paul Plaridel A. Abaya Jr	Liberal Party	41,710	22.07
Total		188,973	100.00

=== 2nd District ===
Candidate	Party	Votes	%
Jesusa Victoria G. Hernandez-Bautista Revilla	Lakas–CMD	172,694	100.00
Total		172,694	100.00

=== 3rd District ===
Candidate	Party	Votes	%
Adrian Jay Advincula	National Unity Party	98,072	53.10
Emmanuel L. Maliksi	Aksyon Demokratiko	78,916	42.73
Marvyn L. Maristela	WPP	7,700	4.17
Total		184,688	100.00

=== 4th District ===
Candidate	Party	Votes	%
Francisco A. Barzaga	National Unity Party	165,942	50.33
Jacinto B. Frani Jr	Independent	150,316	45.59
Osmundo M. Calupad	Independent	9,853	2.99
Leysander A. Ordenes	Partido Lakas ng Masa	3,591	1.09
Total		329,702	100.00

=== 5th District ===
Candidate	Party	Votes	%
Roy Loyola	Nationalist People's Coalition	149,622	61.00
Julie S. Tolentino	Independent	95,646	39.00
Total		245,268	100.00

=== 6th District ===
Candidate	Party	Votes	%
Antonio Ferrer	National Unity Party	121,284	100.00
Total		121,284	100.00

=== 7th District ===
Candidate	Party	Votes	%
Crispin Diego D. Remulla	National Unity Party	190,499	80.88
Michael Angelo B. Santos	Independent	27,505	11.68
Jualinio R. Abutin	WPP	17,531	7.44
Total		235,535	100.00

=== 8th District ===
Candidate	Party	Votes	%
Aniela Bianca Tolentino	National Unity Party	167,163	76.60
Irene P. Bencito	Aksyon Demokratiko	45,398	20.80
Allan R. Par	Independent	5,676	2.60
Total		218,237	100.00

== Cebu ==
=== 1st District ===
Candidate	Party	Votes	%
Rhea Gullas	Lakas–CMD	282,814	100.00
Total		282,814	100.00

=== 2nd District ===
Candidate	Party	Votes	%
Edsel Galeos	Lakas–CMD	91,984	60.48
Hilario Davide III	Independent	60,111	39.52
Total		152,095	100.00

=== 3rd District ===
Candidate	Party	Votes	%
Karen Flores-Garcia	National Unity Party/One Cebu	155,730	100.00
Total		155,730	100.00

=== 4th District ===
Candidate	Party	Votes	%
Sun Shimura	Pwersa ng Masang Pilipino	149,336	52.57
Janice Z. Salimbangon	National Unity Party/One Cebu	132,202	46.54
Salvador B. Cariaga	Independent	2,509	0.88
Total		284,047	100.00

=== 5th District ===
Candidate	Party	Votes	%
Vincent Franco D. Frasco	National Unity Party/One Cebu	217,303	62.01
Thomas Mark H. Durano	Independent	133,102	37.99
Total		350,405	100.00

=== 6th District ===
Candidate	Party	Votes	%
Daphne Lagon	Lakas–CMD/One Cebu	104,768	100.00
Total		104,768	100.00

=== 7th District ===
Candidate	Party	Votes	%
Patricia Calderon	Nationalist People's Coalition/One Cebu	74,936	59.71
Ma. Fema T. Duterte	PDP–Laban	43,725	34.84
Joselito P. Navarro	Partido Federal ng Pilipinas	6,829	5.44
Total		125,490	100.00

== Cebu City ==
=== 1st District ===
Candidate	Party	Votes	%
Rachel del Mar	Nationalist People's Coalition	105,581	42.26
Franklyn O. Ong	Laban ng Demokratikong Pilipino	81,705	32.70
Mary Ann C. de los Santos	Liberal Party	60,282	24.13
Berty Neil M. Lerios	Independent	2,257	0.90
Total		249,825	100.00

=== 2nd District ===
Candidate	Party	Votes	%
Eduardo Rama Jr.	Lakas–CMD/Partido Barug	181,055	57.89
Rodrigo A. Abellanosa Sr.	Independent	131,723	42.11
Total		312,778	100.00

== Cotabato ==
=== 1st District ===
Candidate	Party	Votes	%
Edwin Cruzado	Pwersa ng Masang Pilipino	98,210	50.92
Joselito S. Sacdalan	Nationalist People's Coalition	94,679	49.08
Total		192,889	100.00

=== 2nd District ===
Candidate	Party	Votes	%
Rudy Caoagdan	Nacionalista Party	195,870	94.74
Gregorio A. Andolana	Independent	10,874	5.26
Total		206,744	100.00

=== 3rd District ===
Candidate	Party	Votes	%
Ma. Alana Samantha T. Santos	Lakas–CMD	169,867	100.00
Total		169,867	100.00

== Davao City ==
=== 1st District ===
Candidate	Party	Votes	%
Paolo Duterte	Hugpong sa Tawong Lungsod	203,557	78.75
Margarita Ignacia B. Nograles-Almario	Independent	49,186	19.03
Ma. Victoria Z. Maglana	Independent	3,530	1.37
Janeth J. Jabines	Independent	1,870	0.72
Rex M. Labis	Independent	331	0.13
Total		258,474	100.00

=== 2nd District ===
Candidate	Party	Votes	%
Omar Vincent S. Duterte	Hugpong sa Tawong Lungsod	160,432	63.54
Augusto Javier G. Campos III	Partido Federal ng Pilipinas	90,156	35.71
Melogen L. Montesclaros	Independent	1,895	0.75
Total		252,483	100.00

=== 3rd District ===
Candidate	Party	Votes	%
Isidro Ungab	Hugpong sa Tawong Lungsod	178,721	77.57
Wilberto E. Al-Ag	Lakas–CMD	30,687	13.32
Ruy Elias C. Lopez	Partido Federal ng Pilipinas	19,243	8.35
Lito D. Monreal	Independent	1,133	0.49
Dindo Robert G. Plaza	Independent	612	0.27
Total		230,396	100.00

== Davao de Oro ==
=== 1st District ===
Candidate	Party	Votes	%
Ma. Carmen S. Zamora-Apsay	Lakas–CMD	1,348,782	95.34
Francisco J. Tito	Independent	47,988	3.39
Joselito B. Brillantes	Independent	17,938	1.27
Total		1,414,708	100.00

=== 2nd District ===
Candidate	Party	Votes	%
Leonel D. Ceniza	Independent	148,478	56.39
Noe B. Taojo	Partido Federal ng Pilipinas	114,816	43.61
Total		263,294	100.00

== Davao del Norte ==
=== 1st District ===
Candidate	Party	Votes	%
De Carlo Uy	Lakas–CMD	147,057	55.77
Nicandro T. Suaybaguio Jr.	Partido Federal ng Pilipinas	97,519	36.98
Cesar B. Cuntapay	PDP–Laban	14,210	5.39
Edwin M. Concon	Independent	3,655	1.39
Cesar A. Granada	Independent	1,241	0.47
Total		263,682	100.00

=== 2nd District ===
Candidate	Party	Votes	%
Jose Manuel F. Lagdameo	Partido Federal ng Pilipinas	154,306	57.90
Rico L. Peligro	Independent	71,554	26.85
Ana Teresa C. Dujali	Independent	37,959	14.24
Randy E. Sta Maria	Independent	2,707	1.02
Total		266,526	100.00

== Davao del Sur ==
Candidate	Party	Votes	%
John Tracy Cagas	Nacionalista Party	193,123	70.61
Arvin B. Malaza	Independent	80,389	29.39
Total		273,512	100.00

== Davao Occidental ==
Candidate	Party	Votes	%
Claude Bautista	Nationalist People's Coalition	106,637	100.00
Total		106,637	100.00

== Davao Oriental ==
=== 1st District ===
Candidate	Party	Votes	%
Nelson Dayanghirang Jr.	Lakas–CMD	89,269	61.70
Ronald V. Lara	Partido Federal ng Pilipinas	55,424	38.30
Total		144,693	100.00

=== 2nd District ===
Candidate	Party	Votes	%
Cheeno Almario	Lakas–CMD	128,454	60.93
Luisito Emmanuel G. Rabat	Partido Federal ng Pilipinas	82,358	39.07
Total		210,812	100.00

== Dinagat Islands ==
Candidate	Party	Votes	%
Arlene J. Bag-ao	Liberal Party	36,958	54.91
Alan Uno Ecleo	Lakas–CMD	30,347	45.09
Total		67,305	100.00

== Eastern Samar ==
Candidate	Party	Votes	%
Christopher Sheen P. Gonzales	Independent	180,393	61.22
Maria Fe Abunda	Lakas–CMD	108,778	36.92
Arnold G. Azura	Independent	5,481	1.86
Total		294,652	100.00

== General Santos ==
Candidate	Party	Votes	%
Shirlyn Bañas-Nograles	PDP–Laban	163,511	62.74
Loreto B. Acharon	Nationalist People's Coalition	92,771	35.60
Sterling A. Sañado	Independent	4,337	1.66
Total		260,619	100.00

== Guimaras ==
Candidate	Party	Votes	%
Joaquin Carlos Rahman A. Nava	National Unity Party	91,194	89.85
Vicente B. de Asis	Independent	10,305	10.15
Total		101,499	100.00

== Ifugao ==
Candidate	Party	Votes	%
Solomon Chungalao	Nationalist People's Coalition	63,771	54.70
Francis B. Cuyop	Partido Federal ng Pilipinas	52,314	44.87
Nelson B. Ayoc	Independent	355	0.30
Valdo Boyd T. Ngipol	PDP–Laban	145	0.12
Total		116,585	100.00

== Iligan ==
Candidate	Party	Votes	%
Celso Regencia	Lakas–CMD	74,818	49.34
Oscar V. Badelles	Nacionalista Party	58,895	38.84
Graciano J. Mijares	National Unity Party	11,447	7.55
Emmanuel C. Salibay	Independent	5,747	3.79
Seigred J. Espina	Independent	745	0.49
Total		151,652	100.00

== Ilocos Norte ==
=== 1st District ===
Candidate	Party	Votes	%
Ferdinand Alexander A. Marcos III	Partido Federal ng Pilipinas	169,880	100.00
Total		169,880	100.00

=== 2nd District ===
Candidate	Party	Votes	%
Eugenio Angelo M. Barba	Nacionalista Party	137,658	100.00
Total		137,658	100.00

== Ilocos Sur ==
=== 1st District ===
Candidate	Party	Votes	%
Ronald Singson	Nationalist People's Coalition	143,361	92.36
Charles S. Savellano	Independent	11,854	7.64
Total		155,215	100.00

=== 2nd District ===
Candidate	Party	Votes	%
Grace Kristine G. Singson-Meehan	Nationalist People's Coalition	163,262	68.18
Roque S. Verzosa Jr	Independent	76,181	31.82
Total		239,443	100.00

== Iloilo ==
=== 1st District ===
Candidate	Party	Votes	%
Janette Garin	Lakas–CMD	154,031	86.60
Victor T. Tabaquirao	PDP–Laban	19,929	11.20
Rosendo S. Lagusta	Independent	3,900	2.19
Total		177,860	100.00

=== 2nd District ===
Candidate	Party	Votes	%
Kathryn Joyce Fermin-Gorriceta	Lakas–CMD	143,184	100.00
Total		143,184	100.00

=== 3rd District ===
Candidate	Party	Votes	%
Lorenz Defensor	National Unity Party	194,791	98.64
Thelma S. Langusta	Independent	2,679	1.36
Total		197,470	100.00

=== 4th District ===
Candidate	Party	Votes	%
Ferjenel Biron	Nacionalista Party	139,202	63.73
Charlie B. Sustento Jr.	Reform PH Party	79,236	36.27
Total		218,438	100.00

=== 5th District ===
Candidate	Party	Votes	%
Binky April Montesclaros-Tupas	Lakas–CMD	145,283	56.18
Niel C. Tupas Jr.	Nationalist People's Coalition	113,313	43.82
Total		258,596	100.00

== Iloilo City ==
Candidate	Party	Votes	%
Julienne Baronda	Lakas–CMD	178,056	78.13
Carmelo L. Carreon	Independent	44,913	19.71
Danilo B. Purzuelo	Independent	4,940	2.17
Total		227,909	100.00

== Isabela ==
=== 1st District ===
Candidate	Party	Votes	%
Antonio T. Albano	Lakas–CMD	172,333	100.00
Total		172,333	100.00

=== 2nd District ===
Candidate	Party	Votes	%
Ed Christopher Go	Lakas–CMD	90,186	100.00
Total		90,186	100.00

=== 3rd District ===
Candidate	Party	Votes	%
Ian Paul Dy	Lakas–CMD	118,333	100.00
Total		118,333	100.00

=== 4th District ===
Candidate	Party	Votes	%
Joseph S. Tan	Lakas–CMD	112,993	73.40
Giorgidi Aggabao	Nationalist People's Coalition	39,908	25.92
Jeanybel A. Coquilla	PDP–Laban	1,043	0.68
Total		153,944	100.00

=== 5th District ===
Candidate	Party	Votes	%
Faustino Michael Carlos T. Dy III	Lakas–CMD	98,151	100.00
Total		98,151	100.00

=== 6th District ===
Candidate	Party	Votes	%
Faustino G. Dy III	Partido Federal ng Pilipinas	129,097	100.00
Total		129,097	100.00

== Kalinga ==
Candidate	Party	Votes	%
Caroline B. Agyao-Mangaoang	Partido Federal ng Pilipinas	60,419	43.98
Steve B. Ludan	Nationalist People's Coalition	39,688	28.89
Sacrament S. Gumilab	Independent	37,286	27.14
Total		137,393	100.00

== La Union ==
=== 1st District ===
Candidate	Party	Votes	%
Francisco Paolo P. Ortega V	Lakas–CMD	143,823	73.45
Geraldine Joy R. Ortega	Nacionalista Party	48,420	24.73
Eduardo A. Banzon	PDP–Laban	3,578	1.83
Total		195,821	100.00

=== 2nd District ===
Candidate	Party	Votes	%
Dante Garcia	Lakas–CMD	212,781	81.29
Francisco Emmanuel R. Ortega III	Nationalist People's Coalition	47,877	18.29
Joel B. Fontanilla	Independent	1,105	0.42
Total		261,763	100.00

== Laguna ==
=== 1st District ===
Candidate	Party	Votes	%
Ma. Rene Ann Lourdes G. Matibag	Lakas–CMD	111,214	100.00
Total		111,214	100.00

=== 2nd District ===
Candidate	Party	Votes	%
Ramil Hernandez	Lakas–CMD	142,815	51.16
Richard C. Hain	National Unity Party	136,353	48.84
Total		279,168	100.00

=== 3rd District ===
Candidate	Party	Votes	%
Loreto Amante	Lakas–CMD	238,140	86.38
Ernesto H. Empemano	Reform PH Party	28,730	10.42
Ronilo B. Masirag	Independent	4,697	1.70
Oscar C. Mamaril	Independent	4,106	1.49
Total		275,673	100.00

=== 4th District ===
Candidate	Party	Votes	%
Benjamin Agarao Jr.	Partido Federal ng Pilipinas	150,553	50.06
Antonio M. Carolino	National Unity Party	150,217	49.94
Total		300,770	100.00

== Lanao del Norte ==
=== 1st District ===
Candidate	Party	Votes	%
Imelda C. Quibranza-Dimaporo	Partido Federal ng Pilipinas	111,639	86.58
Osop Joe P. Abbas	United Nationalist Alliance	17,311	13.42
Total		128,950	100.00

=== 2nd District ===
Candidate	Party	Votes	%
Sittie Aminah Q. Dimaporo	Lakas–CMD	142,181	89.10
Amer Nagamura T. Moner Sr	United Nationalist Alliance	17,387	10.90
Total		159,568	100.00

== Lanao del Sur ==
=== 1st District ===
Candidate	Party	Votes	%
Ziaur-Rahman A. Adiong	Lakas–CMD	210,376	70.76
Hussein M. Hadjiomar	United Bangsamoro Justice Party	76,569	25.76
Macloc P. Dagalangit	WPP	9,263	3.12
Naguib A. Macabato	Independent	1,087	0.37
Total		297,295	100.00

=== 2nd District ===
Candidate	Party	Votes	%
Yasser Balindong	Lakas–CMD	174,310	80.20
Rehan B. Lao	United Bangsamoro Justice Party	43,025	19.80
Total		217,335	100.00

== Lapu-Lapu City ==
Candidate	Party	Votes	%
Junard Chan	Partido Federal ng Pilipinas	160,447	72.17
Ryan Jay C. Yuson	PDP–Laban	61,856	27.83
Total		222,303	100.00

== Las Piñas ==
Candidate	Party	Votes	%
Mark Anthony Santos	Independent	109,220	46.75
Cynthia Villar	Nacionalista Party	79,315	33.95
Luisito D. Redoble	Katipunan ng Nagkakaisang Pilipino	35,730	15.29
John Barry T. Tayam	Independent	9,359	4.01
Total		233,624	100.00

== Leyte ==
=== 1st District ===
Candidate	Party	Votes	%
Ferdinand Martin G. Romualdez	Lakas–CMD	177,486	100.00
Romilda A. Bacale (disqualified)	Independent	0	0.00
Total		177,486	100.00

=== 2nd District ===
Candidate	Party	Votes	%
Lolita Javier	Nacionalista Party	177,875	80.03
Alberto N. Hidalgo	Independent	44,387	19.97
Total		222,262	100.00

=== 3rd District ===
Candidate	Party	Votes	%
Anna Victoria Veloso-Tuazon	National Unity Party	57,303	53.47
Emmanuel B. Veloso	Partido Federal ng Pilipinas	49,861	46.53
Total		107,164	100.00

=== 4th District ===
Candidate	Party	Votes	%
Richard Frank I. Gomez	Partido Federal ng Pilipinas	172,483	56.94
Vicente Sofronio E. Veloso III	National Unity Party	130,415	43.06
Total		302,898	100.00

=== 5th District ===
Candidate	Party	Votes	%
Carl Nicolas C. Cari	Lakas–CMD	154,025	75.94
Levito Baligod	Independent	48,806	24.06
Total		202,831	100.00

== Maguindanao del Norte ==
Candidate	Party	Votes	%
Sittie Shahara "Dimple" I. Mastura	Lakas–CMD	231,745	65.98
Bai Sandra S. Ampatuan-Sema	United Bangsamoro Justice Party	117,263	33.38
Sittie Mariefa T. Gascon	Independent	2,248	0.64
Total		351,256	100.00

== Maguindanao del Sur ==
Candidate	Party	Votes	%
Esmael Mangudadatu	Partido Federal ng Pilipinas	166,090	50.12
Mohamad P. Paglas	Lakas–CMD	165,280	49.88
Total		331,370	100.00

== Makati ==
=== 1st District ===
Candidate	Party	Votes	%
Monique Yazmin Maria Q. Lagdameo	Makatizens United Party	130,355	89.82
Angelo E. Base	Independent	8,324	5.74
Minnie A. Antonio	Independent	6,458	4.45
Total		145,137	100.00

=== 2nd District ===
Candidate	Party	Votes	%
Dennis B. Almario	Makatizens United Party	19,834	55.19
Vincent T. Sese	United Nationalist Alliance	16,101	44.81
Total		35,935	100.00

== Malabon ==
Candidate	Party	Votes	%
Antolin Oreta III	National Unity Party	84,940	45.71
Federico S. Sandoval II	Lakas–CMD	67,824	36.50
Florencio Gabriel G. Noel	Nationalist People's Coalition	20,578	11.07
Bernard C. Dela Cruz	PDP–Laban	12,480	6.72
Total		185,822	100.00

== Mandaluyong ==
Candidate	Party	Votes	%
Alexandria Gonzales	National Unity Party	141,464	100.00
Total		141,464	100.00

== Mandaue ==
Candidate	Party	Votes	%
Emmarie Ouano-Dizon	Lakas–CMD	117,107	59.55
Regal M. Oliva	Aksyon Demokratiko	79,548	40.45
Total		196,655	100.00

== Manila ==
=== 1st District ===
Candidate	Party	Votes	%
Ernesto M. Dionisio Jr.	Lakas–CMD	109,838	51.00
Joseph Elphin B. Lumbad	Filipino Rights Protection Advocates of Manila Movement	87,813	40.77
Manuel Luis T. Lopez	Asenso Manileño	16,334	7.58
Edwin H. Santos	Independent	1,385	0.64
Total		215,370	100.00

=== 2nd District ===
Candidate	Party	Votes	%
Rolando M. Valeriano	National Unity Party	59,865	52.74
Carlo Vincent V. Lopez	Nacionalista Party	53,650	47.26
Total		113,515	100.00

=== 3rd District ===
Candidate	Party	Votes	%
Joel Chua	Lakas–CMD	55,007	47.83
Johanna Maureen C. Nieto-Rodriguez	Aksyon Demokratiko	51,283	44.59
Ramon D. Morales	PDP–Laban	8,725	7.59
Total		115,015	100.00

=== 4th District ===
Candidate	Party	Votes	%
Giselle Mary S. Lazaro-Maceda	Nationalist People's Coalition	54,446	41.75
Joel T. Villanueva	Aksyon Demokratiko	35,651	27.34
Louisito N. Chua	Independent	32,937	25.26
Maria Theresa B. Bonoan-David	Independent	7,371	5.65
Total		130,405	100.00

=== 5th District ===
Candidate	Party	Votes	%
William Irwin C. Tieng	Lakas–CMD	87,003	52.08
Amado Bagatsing	Aksyon Demokratiko	80,064	47.92
Total		167,067	100.00

=== 6th District ===
Candidate	Party	Votes	%
Luis C. Uy	Aksyon Demokratiko	64,746	50.54
Bienvenido M. Abante Jr.	National Unity Party	63,358	49.46
Total		128,104	100.00

== Marikina ==
=== 1st District ===
Candidate	Party	Votes	%
Marcelino Teodoro	National Unity Party	75,062	72.07
Aquilino Martin L. Pimentel III	Nacionalista Party	29,091	27.93
Total		104,153	100.00

=== 2nd District ===
Candidate	Party	Votes	%
Romero Federico S. Quimbo	Lakas–CMD	86,984	60.95
Donn Carlo B. Favis	National Unity Party	53,456	37.45
Mauro R. Arce	Independent	1,375	0.96
Jose Jaime R. Enage	Independent	907	0.64
Total		142,722	100.00

== Marinduque ==
Candidate	Party	Votes	%
Reynaldo Salvacion	Independent	73,677	56.59
Presbitero Velasco Jr.	Partido Federal ng Pilipinas	56,527	43.41
Total		130,204	100.00

== Masbate ==
=== 1st District ===
Candidate	Party	Votes	%
Antonio T. Kho Sr	Lakas–CMD	70,214	100.00
Total		70,214	100.00

=== 2nd District ===
Candidate	Party	Votes	%
Elisa Olga T. Kho	Lakas–CMD	141,264	71.78
Noel M. Tuason	Liberal Party	53,596	27.23
Sherman M. Valera	Independent	1,954	0.99
Total		196,814	100.00

=== 3rd District ===
Candidate	Party	Votes	%
Wilton Kho	Lakas–CMD	127,161	89.18
Ricar N. Vasquez	Liberal Party	15,436	10.82
Total		142,597	100.00

== Misamis Occidental ==
=== 1st District ===
Candidate	Party	Votes	%
Jason P. Almonte	Nacionalista Party	122,329	81.08
Roy M. Yap	National Unity Party	28,542	18.92
Total		150,871	100.00

=== 2nd District ===
Candidate	Party	Votes	%
Sancho Fernando F. Oaminal	Lakas–CMD	176,532	93.35
Rodolfo D. Luna	National Unity Party	12,584	6.65
Total		189,116	100.00

== Misamis Oriental ==
=== 1st District ===
Candidate	Party	Votes	%
Jennifer A. Lagbas	National Unity Party	140,549	55.49
Christian S. Unabia	Lakas–CMD	112,758	44.51
Total		253,307	100.00

=== 2nd District ===
Candidate	Party	Votes	%
Yevgeny Vicente B. Emano	Nacionalista Party	241,177	90.40
Manuel A. Po	Independent	25,608	9.60
Total		266,785	100.00

== Mountain Province ==
Candidate	Party	Votes	%
Maximo Y. Dalog Jr.	Nacionalista Party	85,006	100.00
Total		85,006	100.00

== Muntinlupa ==
Candidate	Party	Votes	%
Jaime Fresnedi	Liberal Party	177,504	75.79
Silverio R. Garing	PDP–Laban	56,710	24.21
Total		234,214	100.00

== Navotas ==
Candidate	Party	Votes	%
Tobias Reynald M. Tiangco	Partido Navoteño	116,622	95.57
Anthony M. Ibañez	Independent	5,403	4.43
Total		122,025	100.00

== Negros Occidental ==
=== 1st District ===
Candidate	Party	Votes	%
Julio A. Ledesma IV	Nationalist People's Coalition	157,328	95.27
Erie L. Mahinay	Partido Lakas ng Masa	7,819	4.73
Total		165,147	100.00

=== 2nd District ===
Candidate	Party	Votes	%
Alfredo Marañon III	National Unity Party/United Negros Alliance	121,482	100.00
Total		121,482	100.00

=== 3rd District ===
Candidate	Party	Votes	%
Javier Miguel L. Benitez	Partido Federal ng Pilipinas	200,044	92.03
Joel M. Bantigue	Partido Lakas ng Masa	17,336	7.97
Total		217,380	100.00

=== 4th District ===
Candidate	Party	Votes	%
Jeffrey Ferrer	National Unity Party/United Negros Alliance	130,023	64.20
Lea N. Delfinado	Nationalist People's Coalition	72,503	35.80
Total		202,526	100.00

=== 5th District ===
Candidate	Party	Votes	%
Emilio Bernardino L. Yulo III	Lakas–CMD	201,003	84.67
Anthony Dennis J. Occeño	Partido Federal ng Pilipinas	36,406	15.33
Total		237,409	100.00

=== 6th District ===
Candidate	Party	Votes	%
Mercedes K. Alvarez-Lansang	Nationalist People's Coalition	180,266	84.15
Ernesto A. Estrao	PDP–Laban	33,965	15.85
Total		214,231	100.00

== Negros Oriental ==
=== 1st District ===
Candidate	Party	Votes	%
Emmanuel L. Iway	Partido Federal ng Pilipinas	138,507	62.54
Francisco Y. Mijares III	Liberal Party	82,977	37.46
Total		221,484	100.00

=== 2nd District ===
Candidate	Party	Votes	%
Ma. Isabel Longa-Sagarbarria	Lakas–CMD	159,412	58.87
Felipe Antonio B. Remollo	Liberal Party	105,111	38.81
Jimmy P. Merto	Independent	3,173	1.17
Ryan B. Ybañez	Independent	3,113	1.15
Total		270,809	100.00

=== 3rd District ===
Candidate	Party	Votes	%
Janice M. Vallega-Degamo	Lakas–CMD	128,007	58.33
Janice Teves-Gaston	Liberal Party	65,574	29.88
Reynaldo P. Lopez	Independent	25,867	11.79
Total		219,448	100.00

== Northern Samar ==
=== 1st District ===
Candidate	Party	Votes	%
Niko Raul Daza	National Unity Party	141,867	89.25
Rodolfo R. del Valle	Independent	17,090	10.75
Total		158,957	100.00

=== 2nd District ===
Candidate	Party	Votes	%
Edwin Marino C. Ongchuan	Partido Federal ng Pilipinas	96,304	85.06
Rosalinda D. Capoquian	Aksyon Demokratiko	12,544	11.08
Enrico C. Caballa	Independent	4,365	3.86
Total		113,213	100.00

== Nueva Ecija ==
=== 1st District ===
Candidate	Party	Votes	%
Mikaela Angela B. Suansing-Interior	Lakas–CMD	234,820	83.62
Argel Joseph T. Cabatbat	Independent	40,857	14.55
Virgilio S. Baldovino Sr.	Independent	5,141	1.83
Total		280,818	100.00

=== 2nd District ===
Candidate	Party	Votes	%
Mario O. Salvador	Partido Federal ng Pilipinas	130,421	49.77
Micaela O. Salvador-Violago	Lakas–CMD	129,657	49.48
Danilo R. Malanda	Independent	1,951	0.74
Total		262,029	100.00

=== 3rd District ===
Candidate	Party	Votes	%
Julius Cesar V. Vergara	Partido Federal ng Pilipinas	194,650	51.42
Czarina Umali	Unang Sigaw	183,912	48.58
Total		378,562	100.00

=== 4th District ===
Candidate	Party	Votes	%
Emerson Pascual	Lakas–CMD	197,350	57.32
Maricel G. Natividad-Nagaño	People's Reform Party	146,964	42.68
Total		344,314	100.00

== Nueva Vizcaya ==
Candidate	Party	Votes	%
Timothy Joseph E. Cayton	Aksyon Demokratiko	100,291	40.52
Jose D. Tomas Sr.	Lakas–CMD	76,698	30.99
Ruth R. Padilla	Nacionalista Party	57,482	23.22
Valeriano T. de Leon	Independent	8,597	3.47
Tomas K. Manghi Jr	Independent	2,625	1.06
Jayferly O. Padilla	Independent	1,670	0.67
Lawrence S. Sta. Ana	Independent	165	0.07
Total		247,528	100.00

== Occidental Mindoro ==
Candidate	Party	Votes	%
Leody Tarriela	Partido Federal ng Pilipinas	155,102	63.36
Josephine Y. Ramirez-Sato	Liberal Party	89,698	36.64
Total		244,800	100.00

== Oriental Mindoro ==
=== 1st District ===
Candidate	Party	Votes	%
Arnan Panaligan	Lakas–CMD	192,998	100.00
Total		192,998	100.00

=== 2nd District ===
Candidate	Party	Votes	%
Alfonso Umali Jr.	Liberal Party	114,121	55.44
Edward Jake L. Falcon	Galing at Serbisyo para sa Mindoreño	91,073	44.25
Jerry B. Casao	Independent	636	0.31
Total		205,830	100.00

== Palawan ==
=== 1st District ===
Candidate	Party	Votes	%
Rosalie Salvame	People's Reform Party	145,701	59.14
Franz Josef George E. Alvarez	National Unity Party	100,653	40.86
Total		246,354	100.00

=== 2nd District ===
Candidate	Party	Votes	%
Jose Alvarez	Nationalist People's Coalition	139,469	67.29
Cyrille F. Abueg-Zaldivar	Liberal Party	67,801	32.71
Total		207,270	100.00

=== 3rd District ===
Candidate	Party	Votes	%
Gil Acosta Jr.	Lakas–CMD	79,019	45.86
Abraham Kahlil B. Mitra	Nacionalista Party	72,370	42.00
Elroy John M. Hagedorn	Independent	20,916	12.14
Total		172,305	100.00

== Pampanga ==
=== 1st District ===
Candidate	Party	Votes	%
Carmelo Lazatin Jr.	Partido Federal ng Pilipinas	262,517	100.00
Total		262,517	100.00

=== 2nd District ===
Candidate	Party	Votes	%
Gloria Macapagal Arroyo	Lakas–CMD	227,254	100.00
Total		227,254	100.00

=== 3rd District ===
Candidate	Party	Votes	%
Alyssa Michaela M. Gonzales-Briones	Lakas–CMD	213,914	55.07
Ma. Hazel Anne V. Tumang	Nacionalista Party	165,155	42.52
Jose D. Quiwa III	Aksyon Demokratiko	9,346	2.41
Total		388,415	100.00

=== 4th District ===
Candidate	Party	Votes	%
Anna York Cristina P. Bondoc-Sagum	Nacionalista Party	203,602	65.32
Jorge Antonio P. Bustos	Independent	105,944	33.99
Edgardo G. Puno	Independent	2,156	0.69
Total		311,702	100.00

== Pangasinan ==
=== 1st District ===
Candidate	Party	Votes	%
Arthur Celeste	Nacionalista Party	187,173	100.00
Total		187,173	100.00

=== 2nd District ===
Candidate	Party	Votes	%
Marcos Juan Bruno O. Cojuangco	Nationalist People's Coalition	231,839	77.14
Leopoldo N. Bataoil	National Unity Party	68,719	22.86
Total		300,558	100.00

=== 3rd District ===
Candidate	Party	Votes	%
Maria Rachel Arenas	Lakas–CMD	328,672	91.69
Generoso C. Tulagan Sr	Independent	24,573	6.85
George T. Absolor	Independent	5,228	1.46
Total		358,473	100.00

=== 4th District ===
Candidate	Party	Votes	%
Ma. Georgina V. Perez-de Venecia	Lakas–CMD	229,189	84.75
Alipio Vittorio Ramon D. Fernandez	Independent	41,239	15.25
Total		270,428	100.00

=== 5th District ===
Candidate	Party	Votes	%
Ramon Guico Jr.	Lakas–CMD	187,934	65.30
Franco Paolo S. del Prado	Independent	99,867	34.70
Total		287,801	100.00

=== 6th District ===
Candidate	Party	Votes	%
Marlyn Primicias-Agabas	Lakas–CMD	168,185	58.96
Gilbert R. Estrella	Nationalist People's Coalition	117,045	41.04
Total		285,230	100.00

== Parañaque ==
=== 1st District ===
Candidate	Party	Votes	%
Eric Olivarez	Lakas–CMD	73,351	100.00
Total		73,351	100.00

=== 2nd District ===
Candidate	Party	Votes	%
Brian Raymund S. Yamsuan	Independent	82,700	50.98
Gustavo Alonzo S. Tambunting	National Unity Party	72,765	44.85
Rolando M. Aguilar	Independent	3,190	1.97
Florentino F. Baguio	Independent	1,896	1.17
Rodel A. Espinola	Independent	1,680	1.04
Total		162,231	100.00

== Pasay ==
Candidate	Party	Votes	%
Antonino Calixto	Lakas–CMD	131,640	64.18
Noel C. Bayona	Aksyon Demokratiko	73,463	35.82
Total		205,103	100.00

== Pasig ==
Candidate	Party	Votes	%
Roman Romulo	Nationalist People's Coalition	348,939	95.40
Christian G. Sia	Independent	16,829	4.60
Total		365,768	100.00

== Quezon ==
=== 1st District ===
Candidate	Party	Votes	%
Wilfrido Mark M. Enverga Jr	Nationalist People's Coalition	252,236	100.00
Total		252,236	100.00

=== 2nd District ===
Candidate	Party	Votes	%
David C. Suarez	Lakas–CMD	286,091	100.00
Total		286,091	100.00

=== 3rd District ===
Candidate	Party	Votes	%
Reynante Arrogancia	Nationalist People's Coalition	163,239	69.55
Matt Erwin V. Florido	Independent	71,465	30.45
Total		234,704	100.00

=== 4th District ===
Candidate	Party	Votes	%
Keith Micah Tan	Nationalist People's Coalition	199,930	100.00
Total		199,930	100.00

== Quezon City ==
=== 1st District ===
Candidate	Party	Votes	%
Juan Carlos C. Atayde	Nacionalista Party	93,999	58.53
Vincent Crisologo	Partido Federal ng Pilipinas	66,606	41.47
Total		160,605	100.00

=== 2nd District ===
Candidate	Party	Votes	%
Ralph Wendel P. Tulfo	Partido Federal ng Pilipinas	185,164	81.70
Virgilio R. Garcia	Independent	31,412	13.86
Francisco R. Palma	Independent	6,432	2.84
Roel C. Bernido	Independent	3,638	1.61
Total		226,646	100.00

=== 3rd District ===
Candidate	Party	Votes	%
Franz Pumaren	National Unity Party	73,946	56.10
Allan Benedict S. Reyes	Partido Federal ng Pilipinas	57,874	43.90
Total		131,820	100.00

=== 4th District ===
Candidate	Party	Votes	%
Jesus Manuel C. Suntay	United Nationalist Alliance	91,856	50.07
Marvin Rillo	Lakas–CMD	91,617	49.93
Total		183,473	100.00

=== 5th District ===
Candidate	Party	Votes	%
Patrick Michael Vargas	Lakas–CMD	104,266	50.06
Rose Nono-Lin	Independent	92,984	44.65
Rose Marie R. De Guzman	WPP	6,112	2.93
Fidela V. Mallari	Independent	3,078	1.48
Angel M. Rustia Jr	Independent	1,829	0.88
Total		208,269	100.00

=== 6th District ===
Candidate	Party	Votes	%
Marivic Co-Pilar	National Unity Party	141,794	100.00
Total		141,794	100.00

== Quirino ==
Candidate	Party	Votes	%
Midy C. Nacague-Cua	Lakas–CMD	97,151	100.00
Total		97,151	100.00

== Rizal ==
=== 1st District ===
Candidate	Party	Votes	%
Rebecca Maria A. Ynares	Nationalist People's Coalition	255,258	72.03
John Brian C. Pallasigue	Independent	74,704	21.08
Catalino S. Narciso Jr	Partido Demokratiko Sosyalista ng Pilipinas	14,343	4.05
Antonio T. Galias	Partido para sa Demokratikong Reporma	10,050	2.84
Total		354,355	100.00

=== 2nd District ===
Candidate	Party	Votes	%
Emigdio P. Tanjuatco III	Nationalist People's Coalition	182,212	85.95
Emmanuel N. Mendiola	Independent	29,796	14.05
Total		212,008	100.00

=== 3rd District ===
Candidate	Party	Votes	%
Jose Arturo S. Garcia Jr.	Nationalist People's Coalition	67,417	66.34
Jose Rafael E. Diaz	AKAY National Poltical Party	34,210	33.66
Total		101,627	100.00

=== 4th District ===
Candidate	Party	Votes	%
Dennis Hernandez	Nationalist People's Coalition	87,659	52.28
Juan Fidel Felipe F. Nograles	Lakas–CMD	80,004	47.72
Total		167,663	100.00

== Romblon ==
Candidate	Party	Votes	%
Eleandro Jesus Madrona	Nacionalista Party	129,273	82.37
Vivien R. Carmona	Independent	25,612	16.32
Agustin L. Saluague	Independent	2,048	1.31
Total		156,933	100.00

== Samar ==
=== 1st District ===
Candidate	Party	Votes	%
Stephen James Tan	Nacionalista Party	203,330	100.00
Total		203,330	100.00

=== 2nd District ===
Candidate	Party	Votes	%
Reynolds Michael Tan	Lakas–CMD	219,640	100.00
Total		219,640	100.00

== San Jose del Monte ==
Candidate	Party	Votes	%
Arthur Robes	Lakas–CMD	170,741	74.37
Danilo M. Florentino	Liberal Party	58,845	25.63
Total		229,586	100.00

== San Juan ==
Candidate	Party	Votes	%
Ysabel Maria J. Zamora-Jornada	Lakas–CMD	44,545	66.54
Jannah A. Ejercito	Pwersa ng Masang Pilipino	22,403	33.46
Total		66,948	100.00

== Santa Rosa ==
Candidate	Party	Votes	%
Roy Gonzales	Lakas–CMD	86,177	49.36
Danzel Rafter Y. Fernandez	National Unity Party	60,441	34.62
Sonia U. Algabre	AKAY National Political Party	27,958	16.01
Total		174,576	100.00

== Sarangani ==
Candidate	Party	Votes	%
Steve Solon	Lakas–CMD	187,041	80.42
Kingchopazar L. Belimac	PDP–Laban	41,363	17.78
Jose Wilfredo R. Baliao	Independent	4,185	1.80
Total		232,589	100.00

== Siquijor ==
Candidate	Party	Votes	%
Zaldy Villa	Lakas–CMD/Partido Siquijodnon	41,221	56.98
Mei Ling M. Quezon	Aksyon Demokratiko	30,858	42.66
Johnney A. Ensong	Independent	264	0.36
Total		72,343	100.00

== Sorsogon ==
=== 1st District ===
Candidate	Party	Votes	%
Marie Bernadette G. Escudero	Nationalist People's Coalition	197,919	100.00
Total		197,919	100.00

=== 2nd District ===
Candidate	Party	Votes	%
Manuel L. Fortes Jr.	Nationalist People's Coalition	154,962	73.36
Krunimar Antonio D. Escudero III	Partido Federal ng Pilipinas	51,759	24.50
Saturnino L. Lopez	Independent	2,081	0.99
Jose F. Gabales	Independent	1,527	0.72
Pilar N. Holaso	Independent	920	0.44
Total		211,249	100.00

== South Cotabato ==
=== 1st District ===
Candidate	Party	Votes	%
Isidro D. Lumayag	Partido Federal ng Pilipinas	69,965	47.94
Gerardo F. Barrientos Jr.	Aksyon Demokratiko	51,409	35.23
Leo J. Cordova	PDP–Laban	23,592	16.17
Emer A. Ampo	Independent	964	0.66
Total		145,930	100.00

=== 2nd District ===
Candidate	Party	Votes	%
Ferdinand L. Hernandez	Partido Federal ng Pilipinas	103,984	58.08
Peter B. Miguel	Lakas–CMD	75,046	41.92
Total		179,030	100.00

=== 3rd District ===
Candidate	Party	Votes	%
Dibu Tuan	Aksyon Demokratiko	81,365	46.80
Antonio O. Bendita	Partido Federal ng Pilipinas	73,262	42.14
Miguel M. Matinong	Independent	17,131	9.85
Canecio Glieuf C. Mesias	Independent	2,112	1.21
Total		173,870	100.00

== Southern Leyte ==
=== 1st District ===
Candidate	Party	Votes	%
Roger Mercado	Nationalist People's Coalition	68,306	68.62
Marisa Y. Lerias	Katipunan ng Nagkakaisang Pilipino	29,109	29.24
Oscar A. Camus	Independent	2,122	2.13
Total		99,537	100.00

=== 2nd District ===
Candidate	Party	Votes	%
Christopherson Yap	Lakas–CMD	74,505	52.18
Imelda U. Tan	Independent	68,288	47.82
Total		142,793	100.00

== Sultan Kudarat ==
=== 1st District ===
Candidate	Party	Votes	%
Princess Ruth M. Sakaluran	Lakas–CMD	158,034	100.00
Total		158,034	100.00

=== 2nd District ===
Candidate	Party	Votes	%
Bella Vanessa B. Suansing	Partido Federal ng Pilipinas	138,151	100.00
Total		138,151	100.00

== Sulu ==
=== 1st District ===
Candidate	Party	Votes	%
Samier Tan	Lakas–CMD	204,178	98.29
Bensaudi O. Tulawie	Independent	2,520	1.21
Marcel A. Mudjilon	Independent	1,033	0.50
Total		207,731	100.00

=== 2nd District ===
Candidate	Party	Votes	%
Abdulmunir Arbison Sr.	Lakas–CMD	151,548	100.00
Total		151,548	100.00

== Surigao del Norte ==
=== 1st District ===
Candidate	Party	Votes	%
Francisco T. Matugas I	Lakas–CMD	60,350	62.20
Mary Ann Lucille L. Sering	Nacionalista Party	35,934	37.04
Lanelyn D. Pangilinan	Independent	738	0.76
Total		97,022	100.00

=== 2nd District ===
Candidate	Party	Votes	%
Bernadette Sison-Barbers	Nacionalista Party	124,526	54.10
Arturo Carlos A. Egay Jr.	Padajon Surigao	99,856	43.39
Antonio S. Mainit Jr.	Independent	2,441	1.06
Rodel M. Villanueva	Independent	1,699	0.74
Gil L. Masuhay	Independent	1,637	0.71
Total		230,159	100.00

== Surigao del Sur ==
=== 1st District ===
Candidate	Party	Votes	%
Romeo Momo	Nacionalista Party	161,895	72.82
Justin Marc L. Pelenio	Aksyon Demokratiko	60,416	27.18
Total		222,311	100.00

=== 2nd District ===
Candidate	Party	Votes	%
Alexander Pimentel	Partido Federal ng Pilipinas	86,026	52.04
Ma. Carla L. Lopez-Pichay	Lakas–CMD	73,175	44.27
Celso S. Pichay	Independent	5,310	3.21
Aurelio C. Manlino	Independent	800	0.48
Total		165,311	100.00

== Taguig ==
Candidate	Party	Votes	%
Jorge Daniel S. Bocobo	Nacionalista Party	144,014	53.62
Amparo Maria J. Zamora	Lakas–CMD	116,489	43.37
Noe L. Manila	Independent	8,095	3.01
Total		268,598	100.00

== Taguig–Pateros ==
Candidate	Party	Votes	%
Ricardo S. Cruz Jr.	Nacionalista Party	118,205	46.07
Lino Edgardo S. Cayetano	Nationalist People's Coalition	79,064	30.82
Allan M. Cerafica	Partido Federal ng Pilipinas	54,971	21.43
Pedro C. dela Cruz	Independent	2,692	1.05
Ricardo L. Opoc	Independent	1,637	0.64
Total		256,569	100.00

== Tarlac ==
=== 1st District ===
Candidate	Party	Votes	%
Jaime Eduardo Marc D. Cojuangco	Nationalist People's Coalition	182,032	100.00
Total		182,032	100.00

=== 2nd District ===
Candidate	Party	Votes	%
Ma. Cristina C. Angeles	Partido Federal ng Pilipinas	167,716	53.83
Victor Yap	Sama Sama Tarlac	143,868	46.17
Total		311,584	100.00

=== 3rd District ===
Candidate	Party	Votes	%
Noel N. Rivera	Nationalist People's Coalition	186,630	84.94
Fernando D. David	Partido Federal ng Pilipinas	25,243	11.49
Edison R. Marimla	Independent	4,232	1.93
Federico G. Liwanag	Independent	3,614	1.64
Total		219,719	100.00

== Tawi-Tawi ==
Candidate	Party	Votes	%
Dimszar M. Sali	National Unity Party	140,294	75.38
Anuar J. Abubakar	Aksyon Demokratiko	45,814	24.62
Total		186,108	100.00

== Valenzuela ==
=== 1st District ===
Candidate	Party	Votes	%
Kenneth Gatchalian	Nationalist People's Coalition	80,410	49.45
Antonio R. Espiritu	Aksyon Demokratiko	79,629	48.96
Evelyn M. Hernandez	Independent	2,586	1.59
Total		162,625	100.00

=== 2nd District ===
Candidate	Party	Votes	%
Gerald Cloyd Alexis V. Galang	Independent	95,878	54.36
Katherine L. Martinez	National Unity Party	80,490	45.64
Total		176,368	100.00

== Zambales ==
=== 1st District ===
Candidate	Party	Votes	%
Jefferson F. Khonghun	Lakas–CMD	160,887	100.00
Total		160,887	100.00

=== 2nd District ===
Candidate	Party	Votes	%
Doris Maniquiz	Lakas–CMD/Sulong Zambales Party	173,074	68.41
Cheryl Deloso-Montalla	Nationalist People's Coalition	79,928	31.59
Total		253,002	100.00

== Zamboanga City ==
=== 1st District ===
Candidate	Party	Votes	%
Katrina Reiko Chua-Tai	Independent	54,444	34.53
Josephine E. Pareja	Lakas–CMD	53,381	33.86
Kaiser Adan T. Olaso	Nacionalista Party	46,706	29.62
Al-Khan G. Abduhalim	Independent	3,140	1.99
Total		157,671	100.00

=== 2nd District ===
Candidate	Party	Votes	%
Jerry E. Perez	Adelante Zamboanga Party	100,035	53.93
John Dalipe	Lakas–CMD	66,763	35.99
Michelle Natividad-Daniel	PDP–Laban	15,639	8.43
Darlene P. Sali	Independent	1,594	0.86
Ander C. Ismael	Independent	1,473	0.79
Total		185,504	100.00

== Zamboanga del Norte ==
=== 1st District ===
Candidate	Party	Votes	%
Roberto T. Uy Jr	Lakas–CMD	92,806	58.40
Cecilia G. Jalosjos-Carreon	Nacionalista Party	58,043	36.53
Frederico P. Jalosjos	Nationalist People's Coalition	6,441	4.05
December Gay P. Carreon	Partido para sa Demokratikong Reporma	1,620	1.02
Total		158,910	100.00

=== 2nd District ===
Candidate	Party	Votes	%
Irene Labadlabad	Lakas–CMD	165,985	72.74
Aurelio G. Monteclaro	Nacionalista Party	62,220	27.26
Total		228,205	100.00

=== 3rd District ===
Candidate	Party	Votes	%
Adrian Michael A. Amatong	Liberal Party	129,731	63.28
Cesar G. Jalosjos	Nacionalista Party	75,271	36.72
Total		205,002	100.00

== Zamboanga del Sur ==
=== 1st District ===
Candidate	Party	Votes	%
Joseph Kim C. Yu	Lakas–CMD	190,907	58.32
Eduardo D. Relacion	Nationalist People's Coalition	136,415	41.68
Total		327,322	100.00

=== 2nd District ===
Candidate	Party	Votes	%
Jeyzel Victoria C. Yu	Lakas–CMD	125,668	55.00
Aurora C. Enerio-Cerilles	Nationalist People's Coalition	102,804	45.00
Total		228,472	100.00

== Zamboanga Sibugay ==
=== 1st District ===
Candidate	Party	Votes	%
Marlo Bancoro	Partido Federal ng Pilipinas	81,915	55.98
Wilter Palma	Lakas–CMD	64,415	44.02
Total		146,330	100.00

=== 2nd District ===
Candidate	Party	Votes	%
Anna Marlesa Malahat H. Tamano-Hasim	Partido Federal ng Pilipinas	92,835	48.95
Antonieta R. Eudela-Aniñon	Lakas–CMD	71,823	37.87
Jarvis M. Acosta	PDP–Laban	22,108	11.66
Rino O. delos Reyes	Independent	2,607	1.37
Jose S. Gerosa	Independent	167	0.09
Al-Sharief M. Muloc	Independent	122	0.06
Total		189,662	100.00
