= Jack Enrile =

Filipino politician (born 1958)

The Honorable Jack Enrile
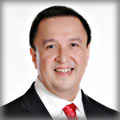
- Official portrait, 2010

Member of the Philippine House of Representatives from Cagayan's 1st district
- In office June 30, 2010 – June 30, 2013
- Preceded by: Sally Ponce Enrile
- Succeeded by: Sally Ponce Enrile
- In office June 30, 1998 – June 30, 2007
- Preceded by: Patricio Antonio
- Succeeded by: Sally Ponce Enrile

Personal details
- Born: Juan Castañer Ponce Enrile Jr. July 16, 1958 (age 68) Manila, Philippines
- Party: NPC (2004–present)
- Other political affiliations: Independent (1998–2004)
- Spouse: Sally Santiago
- Children: 4
- Education: Christian Heritage College (BA); Pepperdine University (MBA)
- Occupation: Politician

Juan Castañer Ponce Enrile Jr. (born July 16, 1958), also known as Jack Enrile or JPEJ, is a Filipino politician. He was a representative of the 1st District of Cagayan in the 11th, 12th, 13th and 15th Congresses. He is the only son and namesake of former Senate President Juan Ponce Enrile of Cagayan and the former ambassador to the Holy See, Cristina Castañer García of Manila. He is married to former Cagayan Province Congresswoman Salvacion "Sally" Santiago.

== Education ==
Jack attended Ateneo de Manila University in the Philippines from Preparatory School (1972) until High School (1976). He then earned a Bachelor of Arts in English degree from Christian Heritage College, El Cajon, California in 1993. He has a Presidential master's degree in business administration from Pepperdine University, Malibu, California (1995). He completed the Digital Business Leadership Program at Columbia University Business School, New York, in 2017.

== Personal life ==
Jack Enrile is married to Sally Santiago with whom he has two children. He has two daughters from a previous relationship, as well as six grandchildren.

== Political career ==
His political career started in 1998 as representative of the 1st District of Cagayan in the Congress of the Philippines, serving from 1998 to 2007 and from 2010 to 2013. He is the principal author of the Batas Kasambahay, Food for Filipinos First, Credit Access and Protection Reform and the Anti-Monopoly Bill. He ran for a seat in the Senate in 2013 but lost. He ran again in 2016 to get back his previous position as representative of the 1st District of Cagayan but lost to Ramon Nolasco.

== Corporate background ==
Enrile was appointed president and chief executive officer of JAKA Investments Corporation and the JAKA Group of Companies from 1994 to 1998.

He founded the Philippine Practical Shooting Association (PPSA) In 1982. He was the president of PPSA. Enrile was also the regional director of the International Practical Shooting Confederation.

== Civic membership ==
Ponce Enrile is a reservist of the 4th Philippine Marine Brigade.

House of Representatives of the Philippines
Preceded by Sally Ponce Enrile	Member of the House of Representatives from the 1st District of Cagayan; 2010–2013	Succeeded by Sally Ponce Enrile
Preceded by Patricio Antonio	Member of the House of Representatives from the 1st District of Cagayan; 1998–2007	Succeeded by Sally Ponce Enrile
