= Sally Ponce Enrile =

Filipino Politician

- Official portrait, 2013

Member of the House of Representatives of the Philippines from Cagayan's 1st District
- In office June 30, 2013 – June 30, 2016
- Preceded by: Jack Enrile
- Succeeded by: Ramon Nolasco
- In office June 30, 2007 – June 30, 2010
- Preceded by: Jack Enrile
- Succeeded by: Jack Enrile

Personal details
- Born: Salvacion Santiago; March 12, 1970 (age 56) Manila, Philippines
- Party: NPC (2007–present)
- Spouse: Jack Enrile
- Children: 2
- Education: Christian Heritage College, El Cajon, California
- Occupation: Politician

Salvacion "Sally" Ponce-Enrile (née Santiago; born March 12, 1970) is a Filipino politician and wife of former Congressman Jack Enrile of the 1st District of Cagayan. She held the same position in the 14th and 16th Congress. She is Founder & Co-chairperson of an investment firm with a focus on financial technology startups.

She is also an artist and is currently represented by several galleries in Europe and New York.

== Education ==
Sally got her bachelor's degree at Christian Heritage College, California, Class of 1994. She obtained a master's degree in psychology from Assumption College. She has another master's degree in criminal justice from Boston University and is a member of the Alpha Phi Sigma National Criminal Justice Honor Society.

== Political career ==
Her political career started in 2007 as Representative of the 1st District of Cagayan in the Congress of the Philippines, serving for two terms - from 2007 to 2010 and 2013–2016. Her husband preceded and succeeded her in the congressional seat.

House of Representatives of the Philippines
Preceded by Jack Enrile	Member of the House of Representatives from the 1st District of Cagayan; 2007–2010	Succeeded by Jack Enrile
