= 2013 Las Piñas local elections =

2013 Philippine local elections

2013 Las Piñas mayoral election
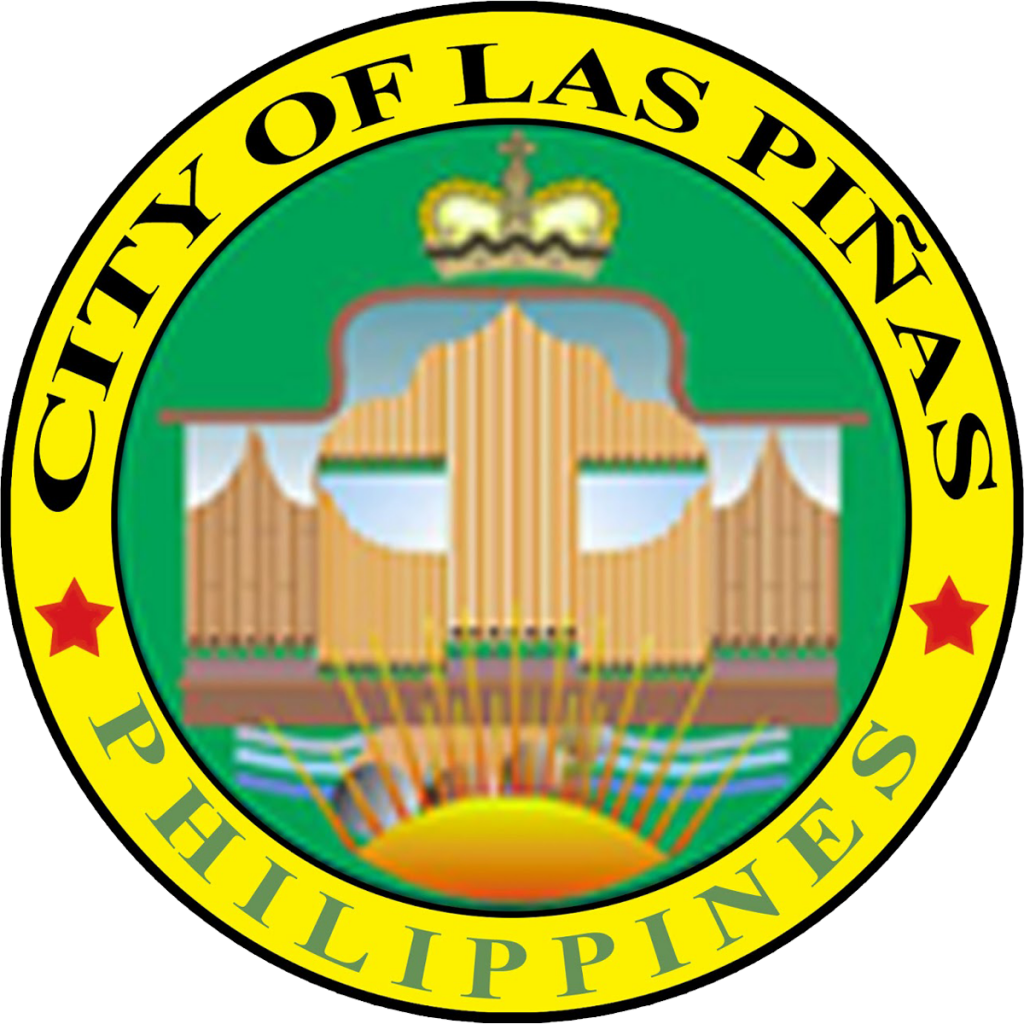
- May 13, 2013
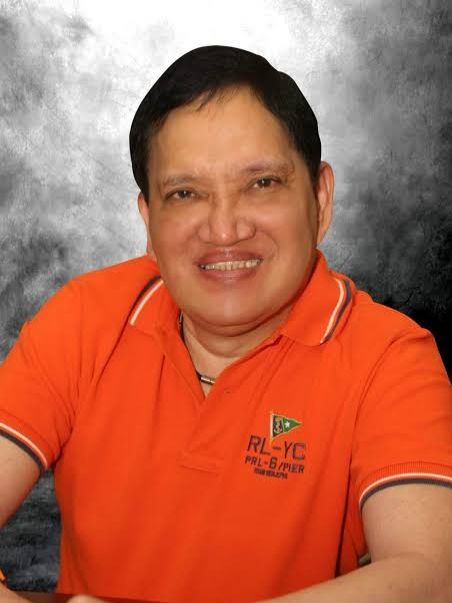
Nominee	Vergel Aguilar
Party	Nacionalista
Running mate	Luis Bustamante
Popular vote	157,825
Percentage	93.02
Mayor before election
Vergel Aguilar
Nacionalista
Elected mayor
Vergel Aguilar
Nacionalista

Local elections were held in Las Piñas on May 13, 2013, within the Philippine general election. The voters elected for the elective local posts in the city: the mayor, vice mayor, one representative, and the councilors, six in each of the city's two legislative districts.

== Background ==
Mayor Vergel "Nene" Aguilar sough re-election for third consecutive, sixth non-consecutive term. His opponents were Conrado Miranda, Antonio Abellar Jr., Felix Sinajon, and Francisco "Kiko" Antonio Jr.

Vice Mayor Luis "Louie" Bustamante sought re-election. His opponents were former Councilor Benjamin Gonzales and Renato Santos.

Rep. Mark Villar ran for re-election for second term. His opponents were Luis "Louie" Casimiro and Filipino Alvarado.

== Results ==
=== For Representative, Lone District ===
Representative Mark Villar of the city’s lone district was reelected with 152,885 votes.

Congressional Elections in Las Piñas's Lone District
Party	Candidate	Votes	%
Nacionalista	Mark Villar (incumbent)	152,885	90.31
Independent	Luis "Louie" Casimiro	13,626	8.05
Independent	Filipino Alvarado	2,781	1.64
Total votes		169,292	100.00
Nacionalista hold			

=== For Mayor ===
Mayor Vergel "Nene" Aguilar won the elections with 157,825 votes, a difference of 153,465 votes over his closest opponent, Conrado Miranda, who got only 4,360 votes.

Las Piñas Mayoral Election
Party	Candidate	Votes	%
Nacionalista	Vergel Aguilar (incumbent)	157,825	93.02
Independent	Conrado Miranda	4,360	2.57
Independent	Antonio Abellar Jr.	3,988	2.35
Independent	Francisco "Kiko" Antonio Jr.	2,297	1.35
Independent	Felix Sinajon	1,202	0.71
Total votes		169,672	100.00
Nacionalista hold			

=== For Vice Mayor ===
Vice Mayor Luis "Louie" Bustamante was re-elected.

Las Piñas Vice Mayoral Election
Party	Candidate	Votes	%
Nacionalista	Louie Bustamante (incumbent)	132,159	86.89
Independent	Benjamin Gonzales	14,958	9.83
Independent	Renato Santos	4,986	3.28
Total votes		152,103	100.00
Nacionalista hold			

=== For Councilor ===
==== First District ====
City Council Election in Las Piñas's First District
Party	Candidate	Votes	%
Nacionalista	Filemon Aguilar Jr.	66,411	
Nacionalista	Mark Anthony Santos	54,577	
Nacionalista	Oscar "Oca" Pena	53,543	
Nacionalista	Buenaventura Quilatan	50,631	
Nacionalista	Rex Riguera	48,354	
Nacionalista	Zardi Abellera	37,285	
Independent	Vilma Miranda	26,575	
Independent	Raymond Reyes	12,541	
Independent	Roderic Vilbar	10,562	
Independent	Adriano Mendoza	8,706	
Independent	Waldy Marasigan	8,320	
Independent	Michael Llamasares	6,958	
Independent	Cornelio Arreglio	6,925	
Independent	Giovanni Lavilla	4,367	
Independent	Marlon Secuya	3,068	
Independent	Loie Taripe	2,736	
Total votes			

==== Second District ====
City Council Elections in Las Piñas's Second District
Party	Candidate	Votes	%
Nacionalista	Carlo Aguilar	60,942	
Nacionalista	Henry Medina	56,698	
Nacionalista	Ruben Ramos	54,130	
Nacionalista	Albert Hernandez	44,605	
Nacionalista	Leopoldo "Dong" Benedicto	42,166	
Nacionalista	Bonifacio Riguera	36,868	
Independent	Butz Zozobrado	22,990	
Ang Kapatiran	Emmanuel Casimiro	19,942	
Independent	Danilo Lopez	8,264	
Independent	Ronald Dominguez	7,522	
Independent	Emmanuel Pepito	6,497	
Independent	Francisco Pomida Jr.	5,353	
Total votes			
