= Cagayan's 1st congressional district =

Congressional district in the Philippines

- Constituency for the House of Representatives of the Philippines
- Location of Cagayan within the Philippines
- Province: Cagayan
- Region: Cagayan Valley
- Population: 459,819 (2020)
- Electorate: 271,961 (2022)
- Major settlements: 10 LGUs: Municipalities; Alcala; Aparri; Baggao; Buguey; Camalaniugan; Gattaran; Gonzaga; Lal-lo; Santa Ana; Santa Teresita
- Area: 4,221.45 km^{2} (1,629.91 sq mi)

Current constituency
- Created: 1907
- Representative: Ramon Nolasco
- Political party: PFP
- Congressional bloc: Majority

Cagayan's 1st congressional district is one of the three congressional districts of the Philippines in the province of Cagayan. It has been represented in the House of Representatives of the Philippines since 1916 and earlier in the Philippine Assembly from 1907 to 1916. The district consists of Cagayan's former capital, Lal-lo, and adjacent municipalities of Alcala, Aparri, Baggao, Buguey, Camalaniugan, Gattaran, Gonzaga, Santa Ana and Santa Teresita. It is currently represented in the 20th Congress by Ramon Nolasco of the Partido Federal ng Pilipinas (PFP).

Prior to its second dissolution in 1972, the first district consisted of eastern and northern Cagayan municipalities of Alcala, Amulung, Aparri, Baggao, Ballesteros, Calayan, Camalaniugan, Gattaran, Gonzaga, Iguig, Lal-lo, Peñablanca, Santa Ana, Santa Teresita, and Tuguegarao, the provincial capital. The province of Batanes was also part of the district from 1907 to 1909 as Cagayan's sub-province. Following the restoration of the Congress in 1987, the district was reapportioned to its current composition.

== Representation history ==
#	Image	Member	Term of office		Legislature	Party	Electoral history	Constituent LGUs
#	Image	Member	Start	End	Legislature	Party	Electoral history	Constituent LGUs
=== Cagayan's 1st district for the Philippine Assembly ===
District created January 9, 1907.
1		Pablo Guzmán	October 16, 1907	October 16, 1909	1st	Progresista	Elected in 1907.	1907–1909; Alcala, Amulung, Aparri, Baggao, Basco, Calayan, Camalaniugan, Gattaran, Iguig, Lal-lo, Peñablanca, Tuguegarao
2		Venancio Concepción	October 16, 1909	October 16, 1912	2nd	Nacionalista	Elected in 1909.	1909–1912; Alcala, Amulung, Aparri, Baggao, Calayan, Camalaniugan, Gattaran, Iguig, Lal-lo, Peñablanca, Tuguegarao
3		Crescencio Vicente Masigan y Sanz	October 16, 1912	February 14, 1914	3rd	Nacionalista	Elected in 1912. Election annulled by House committee due to Spanish citizenship and failure to submit certificate of candidacy.	1912–1916; Alcala, Amulung, Aparri, Baggao, Ballesteros, Camalaniugan, Gattaran, Iguig, Lal-lo, Peñablanca, Tuguegarao
(2)		Venancio Concepción	May 16, 1914	October 16, 1916	3rd	Nacionalista	Elected in 1914 to finish Masigan's term.	1912–1916; Alcala, Amulung, Aparri, Baggao, Ballesteros, Camalaniugan, Gattaran, Iguig, Lal-lo, Peñablanca, Tuguegarao
=== Cagayan's 1st district for the House of Representatives of the Philippine Islands ===
4		Vicente T. Fernández	October 16, 1916	June 3, 1919	4th	Nacionalista	Elected in 1916.	1916–1919; Alcala, Amulung, Aparri, Baggao, Ballesteros, Camalaniugan, Gattaran, Iguig, Lal-lo, Peñablanca, Tuguegarao
5		Miguel Concepción Nava	June 3, 1919	June 6, 1922	5th	Nacionalista	Elected in 1919.	1919–1922; Alcala, Amulung, Aparri, Baggao, Ballesteros, Camalaniugan, Gattaran, Gonzaga, Iguig, Lal-lo, Peñablanca, Tuguegarao
6		Alfonso Ponce Enrile	June 6, 1922	June 2, 1925	6th	Demócrata	Elected in 1922.	1922–1935; Alcala, Amulung, Aparri, Baggao, Ballesteros, Calayan, Camalaniugan, Gattaran, Gonzaga, Iguig, Lal-lo, Peñablanca, Tuguegarao
7		Vicente Formoso	June 2, 1925	June 2, 1931	7th	Nacionalista; Consolidado	Elected in 1925.	1922–1935; Alcala, Amulung, Aparri, Baggao, Ballesteros, Calayan, Camalaniugan, Gattaran, Gonzaga, Iguig, Lal-lo, Peñablanca, Tuguegarao
7		Vicente Formoso	June 2, 1925	June 2, 1931	8th	Nacionalista; Consolidado	Re-elected in 1928.	1922–1935; Alcala, Amulung, Aparri, Baggao, Ballesteros, Calayan, Camalaniugan, Gattaran, Gonzaga, Iguig, Lal-lo, Peñablanca, Tuguegarao
8		Marcelo Adduru	June 2, 1931	June 5, 1934	9th	Nacionalista; Consolidado	Elected in 1931.	1922–1935; Alcala, Amulung, Aparri, Baggao, Ballesteros, Calayan, Camalaniugan, Gattaran, Gonzaga, Iguig, Lal-lo, Peñablanca, Tuguegarao
9		Nicanor Carag	June 5, 1934	September 16, 1935	10th	Nacionalista; Democrático	Elected in 1934.	1922–1935; Alcala, Amulung, Aparri, Baggao, Ballesteros, Calayan, Camalaniugan, Gattaran, Gonzaga, Iguig, Lal-lo, Peñablanca, Tuguegarao
#	Image	Member	Term of office		National Assembly	Party	Electoral history	Constituent LGUs
#	Image	Member	Start	End	National Assembly	Party	Electoral history	Constituent LGUs
=== Cagayan's 1st district for the National Assembly (Commonwealth of the Philippines) ===
(8)		Marcelo Adduru	September 16, 1935	December 30, 1938	1st	Nacionalista; Democrático	Elected in 1935.	1935–1941; Alcala, Amulung, Aparri, Baggao, Ballesteros, Calayan, Camalaniugan, Gattaran, Gonzaga, Iguig, Lal-lo, Peñablanca, Tuguegarao
10		Conrado V. Singson	December 30, 1938	December 30, 1941	2nd	Nacionalista	Elected in 1938.	1935–1941; Alcala, Amulung, Aparri, Baggao, Ballesteros, Calayan, Camalaniugan, Gattaran, Gonzaga, Iguig, Lal-lo, Peñablanca, Tuguegarao
District dissolved into the two-seat Cagayan's at-large district for the National Assembly (Second Philippine Republic).
#	Image	Member	Term of office		Common wealth Congress	Party	Electoral history	Constituent LGUs
#	Image	Member	Start	End	Common wealth Congress	Party	Electoral history	Constituent LGUs
=== Cagayan's 1st district for the House of Representatives of the Commonwealth of the Philippines ===
District re-created May 24, 1945.
(9)		Nicanor Carag	December 11, 1945	May 25, 1946	1st	Nacionalista	Re-elected in 1941. Oath taking deferred.	1945–1946; Alcala, Amulung, Aparri, Baggao, Ballesteros, Calayan, Camalaniugan, Gattaran, Gonzaga, Iguig, Lal-lo, Peñablanca, Tuguegarao
#	Image	Member	Term of office		Congress	Party	Electoral history	Constituent LGUs
#	Image	Member	Start	End	Congress	Party	Electoral history	Constituent LGUs
=== Cagayan's 1st district for the House of Representatives of the Philippines ===
(10)		Conrado V. Singson	May 25, 1946	December 30, 1949	1st	Nacionalista	Re-elected in 1946.	1946–1949; Alcala, Amulung, Aparri, Baggao, Ballesteros, Calayan, Camalaniugan, Gattaran, Gonzaga, Iguig, Lal-lo, Peñablanca, Tuguegarao
11		Domingo S. Siázon	December 30, 1949	December 30, 1953	2nd	Nacionalista	Elected in 1949.	1949–1965; Alcala, Amulung, Aparri, Baggao, Ballesteros, Calayan, Camalaniugan, Gattaran, Gonzaga, Iguig, Lal-lo, Peñablanca, Santa Ana, Tuguegarao
12		Felipe R. Garduque	December 30, 1953	December 30, 1959	3rd	Nacionalista	Elected in 1953.	1949–1965; Alcala, Amulung, Aparri, Baggao, Ballesteros, Calayan, Camalaniugan, Gattaran, Gonzaga, Iguig, Lal-lo, Peñablanca, Santa Ana, Tuguegarao
12		Felipe R. Garduque	December 30, 1953	December 30, 1959	4th	Nacionalista	Re-elected in 1957. Resigned on election as Cagayan governor.	1949–1965; Alcala, Amulung, Aparri, Baggao, Ballesteros, Calayan, Camalaniugan, Gattaran, Gonzaga, Iguig, Lal-lo, Peñablanca, Santa Ana, Tuguegarao
13		Tito Dupaya	December 30, 1961	September 23, 1972	5th	Nacionalista	Elected in 1961.	1949–1965; Alcala, Amulung, Aparri, Baggao, Ballesteros, Calayan, Camalaniugan, Gattaran, Gonzaga, Iguig, Lal-lo, Peñablanca, Santa Ana, Tuguegarao
13		Tito Dupaya	December 30, 1961	September 23, 1972	6th	Liberal	Re-elected in 1965.	1965–1972; Alcala, Amulung, Aparri, Baggao, Ballesteros, Calayan, Camalaniugan, Gattaran, Gonzaga, Iguig, Lal-lo, Peñablanca, Santa Ana, Santa Teresita, Tuguegarao
13		Tito Dupaya	December 30, 1961	September 23, 1972	7th	Liberal	Re-elected in 1969. Removed from office after imposition of martial law.	1965–1972; Alcala, Amulung, Aparri, Baggao, Ballesteros, Calayan, Camalaniugan, Gattaran, Gonzaga, Iguig, Lal-lo, Peñablanca, Santa Ana, Santa Teresita, Tuguegarao
District dissolved into the seven-seat Region II's at-large district for the Interim Batasang Pambansa, followed by the three-seat Cagayan's at-large district for the Regular Batasang Pambansa.
District re-created February 2, 1987.
14		Domingo A. Tuzon	June 30, 1987	June 30, 1992	8th	Nacionalista	Elected in 1987.	1987–present Alcala, Aparri, Baggao, Buguey, Camalaniugan, Gattaran, Gonzaga, Lal-lo, Santa Ana, Santa Teresita
15		Juan Ponce Enrile	June 30, 1992	June 30, 1995	9th	Nacionalista	Elected in 1992.	1987–present Alcala, Aparri, Baggao, Buguey, Camalaniugan, Gattaran, Gonzaga, Lal-lo, Santa Ana, Santa Teresita
15		Juan Ponce Enrile	June 30, 1992	June 30, 1995	9th	Independent	Elected in 1992.	1987–present Alcala, Aparri, Baggao, Buguey, Camalaniugan, Gattaran, Gonzaga, Lal-lo, Santa Ana, Santa Teresita
16		Patricio T. Antonio	June 30, 1995	June 30, 1998	10th	Lakas	Elected in 1995.	1987–present Alcala, Aparri, Baggao, Buguey, Camalaniugan, Gattaran, Gonzaga, Lal-lo, Santa Ana, Santa Teresita
17		Jack Enrile	June 30, 1998	June 30, 2007	11th	Independent	Elected in 1998.	1987–present Alcala, Aparri, Baggao, Buguey, Camalaniugan, Gattaran, Gonzaga, Lal-lo, Santa Ana, Santa Teresita
17		Jack Enrile	June 30, 1998	June 30, 2007	12th	Independent	Re-elected in 2001.	1987–present Alcala, Aparri, Baggao, Buguey, Camalaniugan, Gattaran, Gonzaga, Lal-lo, Santa Ana, Santa Teresita
17		Jack Enrile	June 30, 1998	June 30, 2007	13th	NPC	Re-elected in 2004.	1987–present Alcala, Aparri, Baggao, Buguey, Camalaniugan, Gattaran, Gonzaga, Lal-lo, Santa Ana, Santa Teresita
18		Sally Ponce Enrile	June 30, 2007	June 30, 2010	14th	NPC	Elected in 2007.	1987–present Alcala, Aparri, Baggao, Buguey, Camalaniugan, Gattaran, Gonzaga, Lal-lo, Santa Ana, Santa Teresita
(17)		Jack Enrile	June 30, 2010	June 30, 2013	15th	NPC	Elected in 2010.	1987–present Alcala, Aparri, Baggao, Buguey, Camalaniugan, Gattaran, Gonzaga, Lal-lo, Santa Ana, Santa Teresita
(18)		Sally Ponce Enrile	June 30, 2013	June 30, 2016	16th	NPC	Elected in 2013.	1987–present Alcala, Aparri, Baggao, Buguey, Camalaniugan, Gattaran, Gonzaga, Lal-lo, Santa Ana, Santa Teresita
19		Ramon Nolasco	June 30, 2016	June 30, 2019	17th	Liberal	Elected in 2016.	1987–present Alcala, Aparri, Baggao, Buguey, Camalaniugan, Gattaran, Gonzaga, Lal-lo, Santa Ana, Santa Teresita
19		Ramon Nolasco	June 30, 2016	June 30, 2019	17th	PDP–Laban	Elected in 2016.	1987–present Alcala, Aparri, Baggao, Buguey, Camalaniugan, Gattaran, Gonzaga, Lal-lo, Santa Ana, Santa Teresita
20		Ramon Nolasco Jr.	June 30, 2019	June 30, 2025	18th	NUP	Elected in 2019.	1987–present Alcala, Aparri, Baggao, Buguey, Camalaniugan, Gattaran, Gonzaga, Lal-lo, Santa Ana, Santa Teresita
20		Ramon Nolasco Jr.	June 30, 2019	June 30, 2025	19th	NPC	Re-elected in 2022.	1987–present Alcala, Aparri, Baggao, Buguey, Camalaniugan, Gattaran, Gonzaga, Lal-lo, Santa Ana, Santa Teresita
20		Ramon Nolasco Jr.	June 30, 2019	June 30, 2025	19th	Lakas	Re-elected in 2022.	1987–present Alcala, Aparri, Baggao, Buguey, Camalaniugan, Gattaran, Gonzaga, Lal-lo, Santa Ana, Santa Teresita
(19)		Ramon Nolasco	June 30, 2025	Incumbent	20th	Lakas	Elected in 2025.	1987–present Alcala, Aparri, Baggao, Buguey, Camalaniugan, Gattaran, Gonzaga, Lal-lo, Santa Ana, Santa Teresita
(19)		Ramon Nolasco	June 30, 2025	Incumbent	20th	PFP	Elected in 2025.	1987–present Alcala, Aparri, Baggao, Buguey, Camalaniugan, Gattaran, Gonzaga, Lal-lo, Santa Ana, Santa Teresita

== Election results ==
=== 2016 ===
2016 Philippine House of Representatives elections
Party	Candidate	Votes	%
Liberal	Ramon Nolasco	89,123	
NPC	Jack Enrile	75,926	
Margin of victory			
Invalid or blank votes		25,725	
Total votes		190,774	
Liberal gain from NPC			

=== 2013 ===
2013 Philippine House of Representatives elections
Party	Candidate	Votes	%
NPC	Salvacion Ponce Enrile	84,869	57.31
Liberal	Ignacio Taruc III	34,324	23.18
Margin of victory		50,545	34.13%
Invalid or blank votes		28,884	19.51
Total votes		148,077	100.00
NPC hold			

=== 2010 ===
2010 Philippine House of Representatives elections
Party	Candidate	Votes	%
NPC	Juan Ponce Enrile, Jr.	79,000	46.23
Liberal	Ignacio Taruc	61,247	40.42
Independent	Joaquin Agatep, Jr.	5,084	3.36
Valid ballots		151,528	90.44
Invalid or blank votes		16,017	9.56
Total votes		167,545	100.00
NPC hold			

== See also ==
- Legislative districts of Cagayan
