= Vicente Formoso =

Filipino lawyer and politician

The Honorable Vicente Formoso
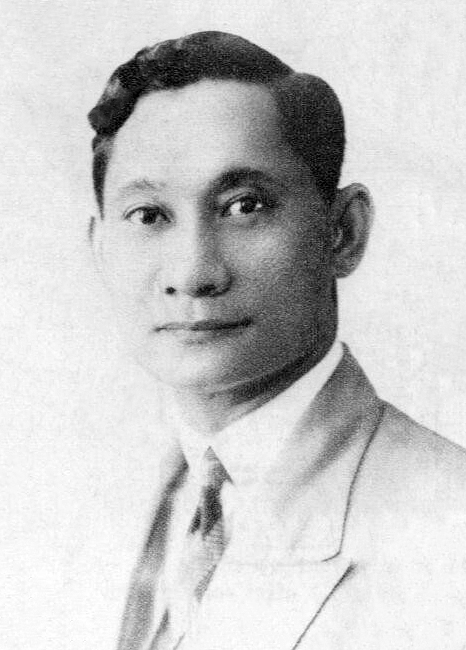
- Vicente Formoso, c. 1934

Governor of Cagayan
- In office 16 October 1931 – 15 October 1937
- Preceded by: Proceso Sebastian
- Succeeded by: Servando Liban

Member of the Philippine House of Representatives from Cagayan's 1st district
- In office 2 June 1925 – 2 June 1931
- Preceded by: Alfonso Ponce Enrile
- Succeeded by: Marcelo Adduru

Personal details
- Born: April 5, 1892 Aparri, Cagayan, Captaincy General of the Philippines
- Died: 1974 (aged 81–82) Manila, Philippines
- Party: Nacionalista
- Education: Colegio de San Juan de Letran
- Occupation: Politician
- Profession: Lawyer

Vicente Formoso y Pablo (April 5, 1892 – 1974) was a Filipino lawyer and politician.

== Early life and career ==
Formoso was born in Aparri, Cagayan on April 5, 1892, to Gabriel Formoso and Eduarda Pablo. He obtained his bacherlor's degree from the Colegio de San Juan de Letran in 1909, a law degree from the La Jurisprudencia school in 1912, and a master's in law from Georgetown University in Washington DC in 1914. After travelling extensively abroad, he returned to the Philippines and passed the Philippine Bar Examination in 1916, subsequently working as a lawyer in his home province.

== Political career ==
Formoso first worked in government as acting provincial prosecutor of Isabela for a few months in 1918. He was later elected to the Aparri Municipal Council. In 1925, he was elected to the House of Representatives of the Philippines representing the 1st District of Cagayan for the Nacionalista Party. He served until 1931 and afterwards was elected governor of Cagayan, serving from 1931 to 1937. During his tenure, he was selected by the governor's league to join the Philippine Independence Mission to the United States led by Manuel Quezon in 1934. He was also responsible for the expansion of the port of Aparri and construction of the town's seawall.

From 1939 to 1941, Formoso served in the Commonwealth National Assembly as an adviser and secretary to Speaker José Yulo. After the Second World War, he was appointed as President of the National Tobacco Corporation from 1947 to 1950 and was a director of Philippine Air Lines and the Philippine National Bank from 1951 to 1953.

== Personal life ==
He was married to Estrella Romillo and had five children. He was also the brother of Gregorio Formoso, former governor of Isabela.
