= 2010 Las Piñas local elections =

Philippine election

2010 Las Piñas mayoral election
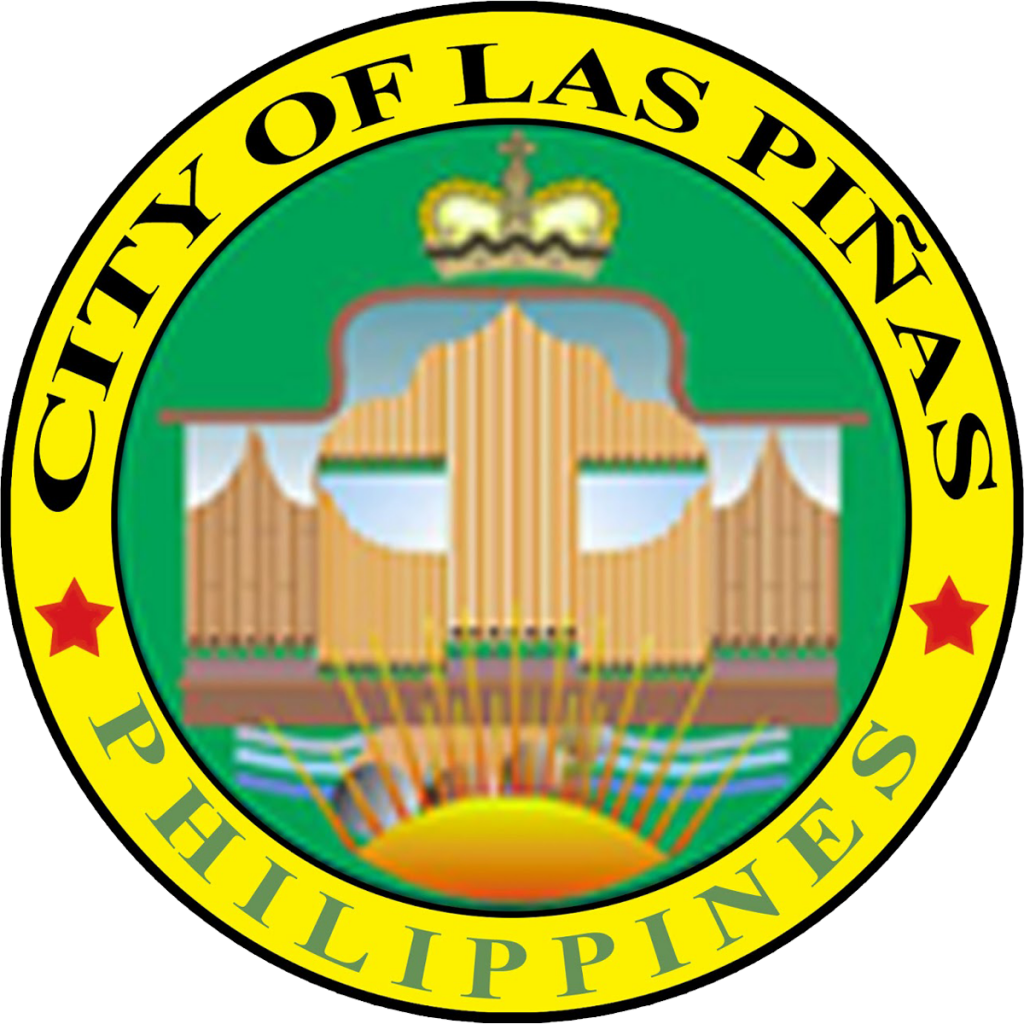
- May 10, 2010
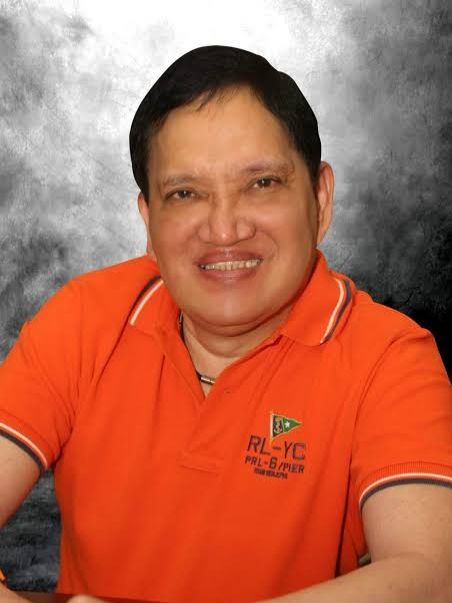
Nominee	Vergel Aguilar	Felix Sinajon
Party	Nacionalista	Liberal
Running mate	Luis Bustamante	Benjamin Gonzales
Popular vote	174,422	8,354
Percentage	91.96	4.40
Mayor before election
Vergel Aguilar
Independent
Elected mayor
Vergel Aguilar
Nacionalista

Local elections were held in Las Piñas on May 10, 2010, within the Philippine general election. The voters elected for the elective local posts in the city: the mayor, vice mayor, one representative, and the councilors, six in each of the city's two legislative districts.

== Background ==
Mayor Vergel "Nene" Aguilar ran for re-election for fourth non-consecutive term. His opponents were Felix Sinajon, Antonio "Doc" Abellar Jr., and Liberato "Levis" Gabano.

Vice Mayor Henry Medina was on his first term, though eligible to run for second term, he ran as councilor instead. His party nominated former Vice Mayor Luis "Louie" Bustamante. Bustamante was challenged by Teodoro "Baldo" Baldomaro, former Councilor Benjamin Gonzales, and Estelita "Ester" Salentes.

Representative Cynthia Villar was term-limited, and she ran for Senate. Her party nominated her son, Mark Villar. Villar was challenged by Filipino "Filip" Alvarado, Francisco "Kiko" Antonio Jr., and Zusarah "Zarah" Veloria.

== Results ==
=== For Representative ===
Mark Villar won the elections.

2010 Philippine House of Representatives election in the Las Piñas' Lone District
Candidate	Party	Votes	%
Mark Villar	Nacionalista Party	155,343	86.39
Francisco Antonio Jr.	Kapayapaan, Kaunlaran at Katarungan	11,908	6.62
Zusarah Veloria	Independent	8,873	4.93
Filipino Alvarado	Independent	3,692	2.05
Total		179,816	100.00
Valid votes		179,816	84.58
Invalid/blank votes		32,778	15.42
Total votes		212,594	100.00
Nacionalista Party hold			
Source: ibanangayon.ph

=== For Mayor ===
Mayor Vergel "Nene" Aguilar was re-elected.

2010 Las Piñas mayoral election
Candidate	Party	Votes	%
Vergel Aguilar	Nacionalista Party	174,422	91.96
Felix Sinajon	Liberal Party	8,354	4.40
Antonio Abellar Jr.	Independent	5,142	2.71
Liberato Gabano	Independent	1,757	0.93
Total		189,675	100.00
Valid votes		189,675	89.22
Invalid/blank votes		22,919	10.78
Total votes		212,594	100.00
Nacionalista Party hold			
Source: ibanangayon.ph

=== For Vice Mayor ===
Former Vice Mayor Luis "Louie" Bustamante won the elections.

2010 Las Piñas vice mayoral election
Candidate	Party	Votes	%
Luis Bustamante	Nacionalista Party	149,931	83.99
Benjamin Gonzales	Liberal Party	21,614	12.11
Estelita Salentes	Independent	3,938	2.21
Teodoro Baldomaro	Independent	3,028	1.70
Total		178,511	100.00
Valid votes		178,511	83.97
Invalid/blank votes		34,083	16.03
Total votes		212,594	100.00
Nacionalista Party hold			
Source: ibanangayon.ph

=== For Councilor ===
==== 1st district ====
2010 Las Piñas City Council election - District 1
Candidate	Party	Votes	%
Dennis Aguilar	Nacionalista Party	73,818	14.80
Buenaventura Quilatan	Nacionalista Party	55,336	11.10
Oscar Pena	Nacionalista Party	54,122	10.85
Mark Anthony Santos	Nacionalista Party	51,328	10.29
Alfredo Miranda	Nacionalista Party	46,755	9.37
Rex Riguera	Nacionalista Party	45,298	9.08
Harry dela Cruz	Liberal Party	27,533	5.52
Vilma Miranda	Liberal Party	26,642	5.34
Raul Trinidad	Liberal Party	22,649	4.54
Elmer Gregorio	Liberal Party	12,311	2.47
Roberto Villanueva	Independent	12,022	2.41
Gladys delos Reyes	Independent	10,476	2.10
Mario Acuna	Independent	9,453	1.90
Adriano Mendoza	Independent	8,670	1.74
Giovanni Lavilla	Liberal Party	8,063	1.62
Winefredo Tanudra	Liberal Party	7,985	1.60
Ahllan Apolonio	Independent	5,976	1.20
Noel Fortuna	Independent	5,055	1.01
Marlon Secuya	Independent	4,671	0.94
Salve Musa	Independent	4,606	0.92
Larry Bugaring	Independent	3,454	0.69
Loie Taripe	Independent	2,520	0.51
Total		498,743	100.00
Total votes		110,584	–
Source: ibanangayon.ph

==== 2nd district ====
2010 Las Piñas City Council election - District 2
Candidate	Party	Votes	%
Carlo Aguilar	Nacionalista Party	70,128	15.48
Ruben Ramos	Nacionalista Party	62,559	13.81
Henry Medina	Nacionalista Party	60,638	13.39
Renato Dumlao	Nacionalista Party	50,270	11.10
Danilo Hernandez	Nacionalista Party	50,231	11.09
Leopoldo Benedicto	Nacionalista Party	41,722	9.21
Emmanuel Luis Casimiro	Ang Kapatiran	24,823	5.48
Danilo Lopez	Liberal Party	15,219	3.36
Perfecto Fernanadez Jr.	Independent	13,254	2.93
Modesto Domingo	Liberal Party	11,816	2.61
Ronald Dominguez	Liberal Party	10,453	2.31
Lannie Aranas	Independent	8,643	1.91
Mario Casabal	Liberal Party	8,455	1.87
Nerissa Murillo	Independent	7,772	1.72
Danilo Paez	Independent	7,688	1.70
Elsa Alcover	Independent	5,555	1.23
Nonita Menil	Independent	3,654	0.81
Total		452,880	100.00
Total votes		102,010	–
Source: ibanangayon.ph
