= Mark Anthony Santos =

Filipino politician (born 1963)

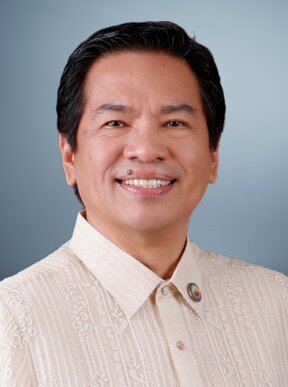
- Official portrait, 2026

Member of Philippine House of Representatives for Las Piñas's at-large district
- Incumbent
- Assumed office June 30, 2025
- Preceded by: Camille Villar
House positions
House Assistant Majority Leader
Incumbent
Assumed office July 29, 2025
Leader	Sandro Marcos
Chair of the House Committee on Dangerous Drugs
Incumbent
Assumed office July 29, 2026
Preceded by	Jonathan Keith Flores

Member of the Las Piñas City Council from the 1st district
- In office June 30, 2022 – June 30, 2025
- In office June 30, 2010 – June 30, 2019

Personal details
- Born: Mark Anthony Gayoso Santos; June 14, 1963 (age 63) Pasay, Rizal, Philippines
- Party: NPC (2022–2025; 2026–present)
- Other political affiliations: Independent (2025–2026); Nacionalista (2010–2022)
- Spouse: Joanne Santos

Mark Anthony Gayoso Santos (born June 14, 1963) is a Filipino politician who has served as the representative for the Las Piñas's at-large congressional district in the Philippine House of Representatives since 2025. Currently a member of the Nationalist People's Coalition, he previously served as a member of the Las Piñas City Council from 2010 to 2019 and 2022 to 2025.

== Early life and career ==
Mark Anthony Gayoso Santos was born on June 14, 1963, in Pasay, Rizal. He previously served as chief of staff to former Las Piñas mayor Vergel Aguilar.

== Las Piñas City Council (2010–2019; 2022–2025) ==
Santos' political career began with his election as a member of the Las Piñas City Council in 2010, where he ran under the Nacionalista Party (NP). He was re-elected in 2013 and 2016.

In 2022, Santos sought a fourth non-consecutive term as councilor, not running in any local ticket (slates included the administration-backed Team Villar-Aguilar of the NP; an all-independent coalition, Team Casimiro, led by Louie Casimiro; and slates of the Ang Kapatiran party and Partido Maharlika) as a candidate of the Nationalist People's Coalition. He topped the election in the city's first district.

== House of Representatives (2025–present) ==
=== 2025 elections ===
Santos challenged outgoing senator Cynthia Villar in the 2025 House elections in the lone district of Las Piñas as an independent candidate. He led Villar by almost 30,000 votes, marking the end of the Villar family's hold on the congressional seat since 1998. He described his congressional bid as a battle like "David and Goliath."

=== Tenure ===
Santos taking his oath as congressman on June 27, 2025

Santos was sworn in as representative-elect on June 27, 2025, and formally assumed office on June 30. At the second session of the 20th Congress on July 29, he was elected assistant majority leader.

On July 29, 2026, Santos was elected chairman of the House Committee on Dangerous Drugs, replacing Bukidnon representative Jonathan Keith Flores, who was elected deputy majority leader. He vowed greater oversight of the anti-drug campaign of President Bongbong Marcos's administration through legislative measures requiring the Philippine Drug Enforcement Agency, Philippine National Police, Department of Health, Department of the Interior and Local Government, Department of Justice, Bureau of Customs, and other concerned agencies to regularly report to Congress through "regular performance reviews and measurable results."

Santos voted in favor of Vice President Sara Duterte's second impeachment on May 11, 2026.

In September 2026, Santos expressed support for investigations by the Office of the Ombudsman into the graft allegations and administrative complaints against the Villar-owned corporation PrimeWater over poor water services and alleged disadvantageous contracts with local water districts.

=== Committee membership ===
==== 20th Congress ====
- Committee on Dangerous Drugs (Chair)
- Committee on Housing and Urban Development (Vice Chair)
- Committee on Labor and Employment (Vice Chair)
- Committee on Appropriations
- Committee on Energy
- Committee on Games and Amusements
- Special Committee on Land Use
- Committee on Legislative Franchises
- Committee on Local Government
- Committee on Metro Manila Development
- Committee on Natural Resources
- Committee on Public Information
- Committee on Public Order and Safety
- Committee on Public Works and Highways
- Committee on Transportation
- Committee on Rules (Assistant Majority Leader)

== Electoral history ==
Electoral history of Mark Anthony Santos
Year	Office	Party	Votes received				Result
Year	Office	Party	Total	%	P.	Swing	Result
2010	Councilor (Las Piñas–1st)	Nacionalista	51,328	10.29%	4th	—N/a	Won
2013	Councilor (Las Piñas–1st)	Nacionalista	54,577	—N/a	2nd	—N/a	Won
2016	Councilor (Las Piñas–1st)	Nacionalista	70,346	—N/a	2nd	—N/a	Won
2022	Councilor (Las Piñas–1st)	NPC	62,310	25.75%	1st	—N/a	Won
2025	Representative (Las Piñas)	Independent	109,220	46.75%	1st	—N/a	Won

House of Representatives of the Philippines
Preceded by Camille Villar	Member of the Philippine House of Representatives for Las Piñas's at-large district 2025–present	Incumbent
