= Proceso Sebastián =

Filipino lawyer, Senator, and politician

The Honorable Proceso Sebastián
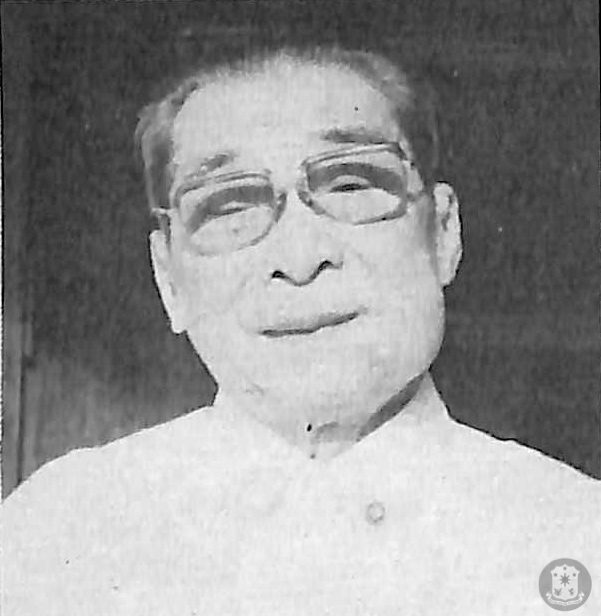

Senator of the Philippines
- In office July 5, 1945 – December 30, 1947

Governor of Cagayan
- In office 1926–1929
- Preceded by: Fermin Macanayan
- Succeeded by: Vicente Formoso

Member of the Philippine House of Representatives from Cagayan's 2nd district
- In office June 6, 1922 – June 6, 1925
- Preceded by: Bonifacio Cortes
- Succeeded by: Antonio Guzman

Personal details
- Born: January 26, 1892 Claveria, Cagayan, Captaincy General of the Philippines
- Party: Nacionalista (from 1925); Democrata (1922–1925)
- Education: University of the Philippines
- Occupation: Politician
- Profession: Lawyer

Proceso Esmeria Sebastián (January 26, 1892 – ?) was a Filipino lawyer, politician and diplomat.

== Early life and career ==
Sebastián was born in Claveria, Cagayan, on January 26, 1892, to Gregorio Sebastián and Filomena Esmeria. He obtained his law degree from the University of the Philippines. After passing the Philippine Bar Examination in 1915, he worked as a lawyer in his home province of Cagayan.

== Political career ==
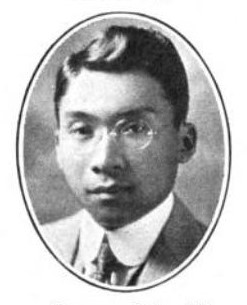
Sebastián as member of the Philippine House of Representatives, c. 1923

Sebastián was elected to the House of Representatives of the Philippines in 1922 representing the 2nd District of Cagayan for the Democrata Party. He served until 1925 and afterwards was elected governor of Cagayan, serving from 1926 to 1929. As a member of the Philippine Legislature, he joined the Second Independence Mission to the United States.

In 1931, he was appointed as a judge, and spent the rest of the decade serving in the Visayas, Laguna and eventually in Manila.

In 1941, Sebastián was elected to the Philippine Senate as a candidate of the Nacionalista Party. Because the Japanese invaded the Philippines shortly afterwards, he was only able to take office in 1945, following the liberation of the Philippines by the Americans. During the Japanese occupation, he was appointed as an associate justice of the Court of Appeals by President Jose P. Laurel.

As senator, Sebastián headed the Philippine delegation to the first UNESCO conference in Paris in 1946, where he was elected as one of the vice presidents of the UNESCO Assembly.

After his term in the Senate, Sebastián was appointed by President Manuel Roxas to become Envoy-Extraordinary and Minister-Plenipotentiary to China in 1948. He was later appointed by President Elpidio Quirino as ambassador to Italy and the Holy See, France, Belgium, the Netherlands, the United Nations Office at Geneva and ultimately Indonesia before retiring from the diplomatic service in 1954.

Sebastián was elected to the Quezon City Council in 1959.

== Personal life ==
He was married to Antonia Villanueva and had three children.
