= Marcelo Adduru =

Filipino lawyer and politician

The Honorable Marcelo Adduru
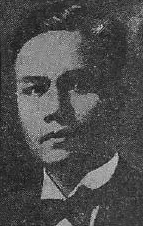
- Adduru in 1939

5th Secretary of Labor
- In office July 12, 1945 – May 28, 1946
- President: Sergio Osmeña
- Preceded by: Mariano Eraña
- Succeeded by: Pedro Magsalin

Governor of Cagayan
- In office 1941–1945
- Preceded by: Servando Liban
- Succeeded by: Baldomero Perez
- In office 1955–1959
- Preceded by: Jose Carag
- Succeeded by: Felipe Garduque

Member of the Philippine House of Representatives from Cagayan's 1st district
- In office June 2, 1931 – June 2, 1934
- Preceded by: Vicente Formoso
- Succeeded by: Nicanor Carag
- In office September 16, 1935 – December 30, 1938
- Preceded by: Nicanor Carag
- Succeeded by: Conrado Singson

Personal details
- Born: June 18, 1894 Tuguegarao, Cagayan, Captaincy General of the Philippines
- Died: January 30, 1972 (aged 77)
- Party: Nacionalista
- Education: University of the Philippines
- Occupation: Politician

Marcelo Adduru (June 18, 1894 – January 30, 1972) was a Filipino politician and guerrilla leader.

== Early life and education ==
Adduru was born in Tuguegarao, Cagayan on June 18, 1894 to Jocobo and Esperanza Adduru. His father died when Marcelo was a child. Adduru attended high school in Tuguegarao before receiving a government scholarship to attend the UP College of Forestry in Los Baños, Laguna, graduating in 1918. He then studied law at the University of the Philippines and graduated in 1923 before being admitted to law practice later that year. Before entering politics, he worked as a botanist, ranger, agent of the Bureau of Commerce, and public defender.

Adduru was also commissioned as a first lieutenant in the Philippine National Guard after graduating from the National Guard School in 1918. He later attained the rank of major in the Philippine Army in 1936 after joining the reserve force.

== Pre-war politics ==
In 1931, Adduru was elected to the House of Representatives of the Philippines representing the 1st District of Cagayan. He served until 1934 and after a hiatus, was elected to the same seat under the Philippine Commonwealth from 1938 to 1941, when he was elected governor of Cagayan as a candidate of the Nacionalista Party. He represented Cagayan at the 1934 Philippine Constitutional Convention.

During his time in Congress, Adduru authored the Cooperative Marketing Law.

== Wartime governor ==
At the outbreak of the Pacific War in 1941, Adduru organized the Cagayan Force, a local defense force composed of teachers, reservists and units of the Philippine Constabulary to fight the Japanese. On January 13, 1942, he along with Captain Ralph Praeger of the Provisional Apayao Force led an attack on Tuguegarao that left 200 Japanese dead in what became the first major success by the US Army following the attack on Pearl Harbor. Adduru then led another attack on Aparri while he and his guerrilla forces operated in Cagayan and Apayao. On June 6, 1942, he was commissioned with the rank of Major in the US Army's Cagayan-Apayao Force, which was formed from the merger of Adduru's Cagayan Force, the 14th Infantry Regiment of the Philippine Army and Praeger's 26th Cavalry, Troop C under the Philippine Scouts.

When the provincial capital of Tuguegarao fell to the Japanese forces on December 12, 1941, Adduru and several provincial officials evacuated and established a rebel government in Cagayan based in Tuao which opposed the Japanese-installed governor, Nicanor Carag. Adduru worked with Praeger in establishing a functioning government that had its own judicial and monetary system. Due to Japanese attacks, Adduru later transferred his headquarters to Rizal, Cagayan and later to Magabubong, a barrio of Kabugao, Apayao.

In December 1942, he was subjected to an attempt by Emilio Aguinaldo to convince him and another renegade governor, Roque Ablan of Ilocos Norte, to surrender to the Japanese. Adduru was captured by the Japanese twice in two separate occasions in 1943 and 1944 but managed to escape both times and participated in the liberation of northern Luzon in March 1945.

== Post-war politics ==
After the war ended, Adduru was appointed in 1945 as Secretary of Labor, serving until 1946, when he became chairman of the board of directors of the National Land Settlement and Development Corporation and later general manager of the same firm from 1951 to 1953. In 1949, he was appointed as chairman of the Cagayan Currency Board, which sought to redeem emergency circulating notes that were issued during the war. In 1953, he became governor of the Agricultural Credit and Financing Administration. He was then elected governor of Cagayan from 1955 to 1959.

== Personal life ==
Adduru was married to Candida Gonzales and had two children.

== Death and legacy ==
Adduru died on January 30, 1972. The regional headquarters of the Philippine National Police in Cagayan Valley is named after him.
