= Ramon Nolasco =

Filipino politician

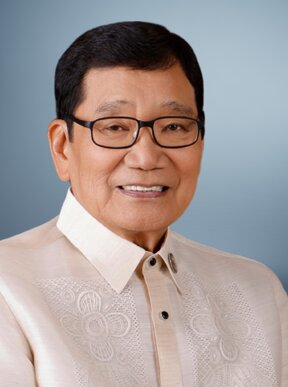
- Official portrait, 2025

Member of Philippine House of Representatives from Cagayan's 1st congressional district
- Incumbent
- Assumed office June 30, 2025
- Preceded by: Ramon Nolasco Jr.
- In office June 30, 2016 – June 30, 2019
- Preceded by: Sally Ponce Enrile
- Succeeded by: Ramon Nolasco Jr.

Member of Cagayan Provincial Board from the 1st District
- In office June 30, 2013 – June 30, 2016

Mayor of Gattaran, Cagayan
- In office June 30, 2004 – June 30, 2013
- In office June 30, 1992 – June 30, 2001

Personal details
- Born: Ramon Nolasco; July 21, 1949 (age 77) Gattaran, Cagayan, Philippines
- Party: PFP (2026–present)
- Other political affiliations: Lakas (2008–2012; 2024–2026); PDP-Laban (2017–2024); Liberal (2015–2017); UNA (2012–2015); KAMPI (until 2008)

Ramon Cases Nolasco (born July 21, 1949) is a Filipino politician who is a member of the House of Representatives representing the First District of Cagayan. He was a member of the Cagayan Provincial Board, representing the First District, and the former mayor of Gattaran, Cagayan. Nolasco is a member of the Partido Federal ng Pilipinas and a former member of the Partido Demokratiko ng Pilipino.

"Mon" to his family and close friends, Nolasco is the sixth child among the ten children of the late Dr. Tomas Nolasco Sr. and Demetria Nolasco. He was first a lawyer under the Public Attorney's Office in Aparri, Cagayan before he entered politics and won as Mayor of Gattaran, Cagayan in 1992.

He was a two-time three-term Mayor of the said town. He ran as board member of the First District of Cagayan in 2013 and won.

In 2016, he faced former representative Jack Enrile for Representative of the First District of Cagayan. Nolasco, despite being the underdog, was proclaimed the winner having more than 13,000 votes ahead of Enrile.

== See also ==
- 17th Congress of the Philippines
