= Southeast Asian Youth Athletics Championships =

Annual athletics competition

The Southeast Asian Youth Athletics Championships is an annual athletics competition between youth athletes (under-18) from Southeast Asian nations which is organised by the Southeast Asian Athletics Association. The event, first held in 2006, was formerly known as the Southeast Asian Junior Championships, though entries have always been for under-18 athletes, rather than the international standard of "junior" signifying under-20 athletics.

The competition serves as a regional complement to the biennial, continental Asian Junior Athletics Championships. Since 2009, athletics has also been held for youths in the region at the annual ASEAN School Games. A separate ASEAN Schools Athletics Championships was first held in 1977.

== Editions ==
Ed.	Year	Venue	City	Country	Dates	No. of events	No. of athletes
1st	2006		Bangkok	Thailand			
2nd	2007	Bukit Gombak Stadium	Singapore	Singapore	9–10 June		
3rd	2008		Phuket	Thailand	22–23 May		
4th	2009	Thống Nhất Stadium	Ho Chi Minh City	Vietnam	6–7 June	30	172
5th	2010	Thammasat Stadium	Rangsit	Thailand	26–27 October		
6th	2011	Gelora Bung Karno Madya Stadium	Jakarta	Indonesia	17–18 June		
7th	2012	Bishan Stadium	Singapore	Singapore	28–29 April		
8th	2013		Ho Chi Minh City	Vietnam	8–9 June		
9th	2014	Wunna Theikdi Stadium	Naypyidaw	Myanmar	27–28 April		
10th	2015	Mini Training Stadium	Kuala Lumpur	Malaysia	11–12 April		
11th	2016	Thammasat Stadium	Rangsit	Thailand	23–24 April		
12th	2017	Ilagan Sports Complex	City of Ilagan	Philippines	27–28 March		
13th	2018	Thammasat Stadium	Rangsit	Thailand	3–4 April		
14th	2019	Ilagan Sports Complex	City of Ilagan	Philippines	2–3 March		
15th	2023	National Athletics Centre	Bangkok	Thailand	7–9 December		
16th	2024	Likas Stadium	Kota Kinabalu	Malaysia	28–30 November		
17th	2025	Madya Stadium	Deli Serdang	Indonesia	15–18 November	63	278
