= List of barangays in Ilagan =

Barangays in Ilagan, Isabela, Philippines

Ilagan, the most populous city in the Isabela, is politically subdivided into 91 barangays. There are currently 13 barangays of Ilagan City's that are classified as urban.

== Barangays by clusters ==
These barangays are grouped into four clusters: Poblacion, Eastern, Western, and San Antonio.

=== Poblacion ===
- Alibagu
- Baculud
- Bagumbayan
- Baligatan
- Calamagui 1st"Dawanggi"
- Calamagui 2nd"Oggoso"
- Camunatan
- Centro Poblacion
- Fugu
- Guinatan
- Imelda Bliss Village
- Malalam
- Osmeña
- San Felipe
- San Vicente
- Santa Barbara
- Santo Tomas
- Saguiguilid del sur
- Saguiguilid del Norte

=== Eastern ===
- Alinguigan 1st"passong"
- Alinguigan 2nd"bagumbayan"
- Alinguigan 3rd"san Jose"
- Ballacong
- Bangag
- Batong-Labang
- Cadu
- Capellan
- Capo
- Fuyo
- Manaring
- Marana I"camisa"
- Marana II"casa"
- Marana III"punta"
- Minabang
- Morado
- Nanaguan
- Pasa
- Quimalabasa
- Rang-ayan
- Rugao
- San Andres
- San Isidro
- San Juan
- San Lorenzo
- San Pablo
- San Rodrigo
- Santa Catalina
- Santa Victoria
- Sipay
- Tangcul
- Tegge
- Vanutas

=== Western ===
- Arusip
- Bagong Silang
- Baraoan
- Cabannungan 1st"laba"
- Cabannungan 2nd"masaya"
- Carikkikan Norte"Pilar"
- Carikkikan Sur"Aquino"
- Hantas
- Ipalao
- Indagan
- Lullutan
- Malasin
- Mangcuram
- Naguilian Norte"PROVIDERS"
- Naguilian Sur"PASE DE CUÑA"
- Piñares
- San Ignacio (Canapi)
- Santa Isabel Norte"Batong Dibi"
- Santa Isabel Sur"Batong Daba"
- Siffu

=== San Antonio ===
- Aggasian
- Cabeseria 10"Pawatas
- Cabeseria 14 & 16"Masalin
- Cabeseria 17 & 21"San Rafael
- Cabeseria 19"Asugan
- Cabeseria 22"Pambalana
- Cabeseria 23"Caramines
- Cabeseria 25"Baanta
- Cabeseria 27"Banesta
- Cabeseria 2"Icolos Tenor
- Cabeseria 3"Icolos
- Cabeseria 4"Danas
- Cabeseria 5"Maysak
- Cabeseria 6 & 24"Duwwa
- Cabeseria 7"Ganvi
- Cabeseria 8"San Mariano
- Cabeseria 9 & 11"Betino
- Centro-San Antonio
- Gayong-gayong Norte
- Gayong-gayong Sur
- Namnama
- Paliueg
- Salindingan
- Sindon Bayabo
- Sindon Maride
- Villa Imelda
- Valleyan

== Barangay facts ==
- By population (2025 census figures)
  - Largest: Ipalao (9,951 people)
  - Smallest: Carikkikan Sur (603 people)
- By population density (to be calculated using 2020 census figures)
  - Most densely populated:
  - Most sparsely populated:
- By land area
  - Largest: Rugao (11,315 km^{2})
  - Smallest: Bangag, Masalin, Cadu, Malasin, Sipay (112 km^{2})
- By elevation
  - Highest: Valleyan (909.5 m (2,983.9 ft))
  - Sugirao (38.0 m (124.7 ft))
- Most extreme points
  - Northernmost: Cadu
  - Easternmost: Sugirao
  - Westernmost: Bigao
  - Southernmost: Paliueg

== Barangay officials ==
List below shows the latest population census (as of 2020), economic class, land area, and the current Barangay Captains (Punong Barangay), and SK chairpersons serving their terms from 2023 to 2025, considered as the shortest term of office.

Gaylor M. Malunay from barangay Cabeseria 3, is the current president of the Liga ng mga Barangay (LNB). Errol John R. Nebalasca from barangay Santa Isabel Sur, is the current president of SK Federation.

Each barangays has seven barangay kagawad, and seven SK kagawad to form the barangay council. Also includes Barangay Justice System as the Lupon Tagapamayapa. Barangay tanods serve as barangay police officers.

As of the most recent Barangay and SK elections held on Monday, October 30, 2023, there are:

- 91 barangay captains (Punong Barangay)
- 637 barangay councilors (Barangay Kagawad)
- 91 Sangguniang Kabataan (SK) chairpersons
- 637 Sangguniang Kabataan (SK) councilors

Barangay	Population (2020)	Economic Class	Land Area (km^{2})	Punong Barangay (2023–2025)	SK Chairperson (2023–2025)
Aggasian	4,032	Rural	264	Wilson A. Taguinod	Ralph Nino C. Navarro
Alibagu	7,916	Urban	7,214	Alfred J. Alluad	Wilson A. Domingo Jr.
Alinguigan 1st	1,909	Rural	459	Joel C. Asis	Joel L. Rosena Jr.
Alinguigan 2nd	3,074	Rural	7,015	Heherson L. Rivero	Christine Mae M. Navarro
Alinguigan 3rd	1,352	Rural	1,765	Nestor C. Manaligod	Johnloyd Z. Atienza
Arusip	901	Rural	209	Saturnino A. Domingo	Risalyn A. Ladimo
Baculud	4,266	Rural	3,214	Orlando R. Balisi	Zedrick A. Dumlao
Bagong Silang	676	Rural	258	Eduardo T. Rivera	Riza Joy G. Balignasay
Bagumbayan	2,321	Urban	4,317	Romeo Christian P. Dado	Michael Vincent R. Bayucan
Baligatan	2,714	Urban	6,815	Alvir Lambert P. Gomez	John Mark S. Tuliao
Ballacong	824	Rural	135	Albert M. Domingo	Remy Kate P. Martin
Bangag	1,307	Rural	112	Samuel Salacup	Ma. Kristina Carla D. Pestanio
Batong-Labang	2,348	Rural	135	George G. Mariano	Angeline A. Napoles
Bigao	1,697	Rural	225	Elger V. Apalla	Reymark V. Apalla
Cabannungan 1st	956	Rural	715	Oscar S. Salvador	Jhon Poul S. Millanes
Cabannungan 2nd	1,852	Rural	715	Rogelio V. Maur	Kyle Lester D. Kanoy
Cabeseria 2 (Dappat)	1,198	Rural	135	Jerry M. Pagulayan	Jefferson U. Mabborang
Cabeseria 3 (San Fernando)	946	Rural	135	Gaylor M. Malunay	Ronel M. Daquioag
Cabeseria 4 (San Manuel)	697	Rural	135	Marivic C. Mata	Carla Mae B. Mata
Cabeseria 5 (Baribad)	882	Rural	135	Juanito T. Baingan	Jojit C. Topinio
Cabeseria 6 & 24 (Villa Marcos)	1,181	Rural	135	Virgilio R. Aunzo	Jaylard T. Balbin
Cabeseria 7 (Nangalisan)	863	Rural	215	Elwood Salvador	Christian Angelo A. Butac
Cabeseria 8 (Santa Maria)	1,208	Rural	135	Khristopher P. Maltu	Godwin M. Rarama
Cabeseria 9 & 11 (Capogotan)	1,695	Rural	235	Judy S. Balido	Anghielene T. Balido
Cabeseria 10 (Lupigui)	2,319	Rural	235	Gerremy M. Servilla	Keejay P. Servilla
Cabeseria 14 & 16 (Casilagan)	2,606	Rural	182	Jackson R. Bueno	Jericho D. Aguinaldo
Cabeseria 17 & 21 (San Rafael)	1,401	Rural	235	Robinson V. Ilayan	John MIke M. Ilayat
Cabeseria 19 (Villa Suerte)	906	Rural	135	Edwin M. Malunay	Franz Hervin Anthony S. Castillo
Cabeseria 22 (Sablang)	1,019	Rural	225	Rogelio V. Bueno	Ved Vincent C. Villanueva
Cabeseria 23 (San Francisco)	956	Rural	135	Freddie G. Rivera	Jaymark L. Mendoza
Cabeseria 25 (Santa Lucia)	1,121	Rural	112	Edilberta A. Omotoy	Benjie B. Castillo
Cabeseria 27 (Abuan)	1,011	Rural	165	Avelino A. Quitola	Lester John B. Servilla
Cadu	662	Rural	112	Imelda G. Ancheta	Janine D. Peralta
Calamagui 1st	3,918	Urban	290	Oscar S. Salvador	Jamaica D. Valeros
Calamagui 2nd	2,697	Urban	5,315	Howard D. Pagallilauan	Patricia Lei B. Bariuad
Camunatan	941	Rural	9,415	Marilyn M. Canceran	Rhussel John G. Casasola
Capellan	3,098	Rural	210	Roderick R. Garcia	Jaribes L. Ramel
Capo	1,106	Rural	235	Jose S. Pagunuran	Ivan Dane J. Dancel
Carikkikan Norte	544	Rural	235	Erlindo M. Guillermo	Erickson C. Cureg
Carikkikan Sur	208	Rural	235	Johnmar M. Apalla	May Anne G. Donato
Centro Poblacion	568	Urban	8,315	Rosarita V. Mariano	Romel S. Miro
Centro-San Antonio	4,631	Rural	290	Nestor T. Tamulto	Aerome Josh M. Cabalonga
Fugu	1,898	Rural	245	Angelo James G. Apolonio	April Joy L. Tagao
Fuyo	977	Rural	825	Isabelo M. Cariaga	Kervie U. Manuel
Gayong-gayong Norte	815	Rural	245	Johny C. Libador	Mark Jay R. Tagata
Gayong-gayong Sur	1,256	Rural	245	Danilo R. Macugay Sr.	Clifford S. Aggabao
Guinatan	1,703	Urban	9,015	Franzel Dhon C. Robles	Kyrie Eleison I. Yumul
Imelda Bliss Village	7,951	Urban	815	Claire M. Soriano	Mark Dane R. Lasam
Lullutan	2,197	Rural	715	Rogelma Z. Talattu	Joshua A. Pataueg
Malalam	1,743	Rural	11,015	Marlon O. Ariola	Regienald M. Pagulayan
Malasin (Angeles)	1,307	Rural	112	Rogelio A. Justo	Dexter M. Balbin
Manaring	2,634	Rural	5,815	Jackielyn S. Pula	Rafael A. Cabasal Jr.
Mangcuram	1,011	Rural	1,215	Edwin R. Lodivico	Sam Eduardo B. Lodivico
Marana I	1,746	Urban	9,515	Tito P. Dela Cruz	Peejay D. Panangui
Marana II	594	Rural	2,230	Angel C. Gangan	Paula Joyce P. Balayan
Marana III	693	Rural	10,215	Romeo C. Gomez	Miernhel C. Valenzuela
Minabang	1,678	Rural	215	Delfin L. Antonio	Joebert V. Ramil
Morado	1,073	Rural	225	Felipe A. Palapuz	Roland S. Cuanan
Naguilian Norte	3,233	Rural	765	Francisco B. Cascue	Fernando P. Battad
Naguilian Sur	1,304	Rural	765	Danilo B. Tamayo	Jem Liemuel V. Madduma
Namnama	1,209	Rural	235	Gerry G. Soriano	Maylove U. Saladino
Nanaguan	615	Rural	235	Mario B. Mora	Jhomer V. Garciano
Osmeña (Sinippil)	3,225	Urban	7,815	June T. Yadao	Melanie D. Maneja
Paliueg	1,545	Rural	135	Warlito P. Baldoz Sr.	Elmar F. Barbero
Pasa	1,113	Rural	125	Robert C. Turgueza	Adan U. Mateo
Pilar	939	Rural	125	Rebeca L. Castillo	Jerome N. Tabliago
Quimalabasa	349	Rural	215	Felimino Q. Domingo Sr.	Ariel G. Dela Cruz
Rang-ayan (Bintacan)	1,658	Rural	235	Aldrich T. Tindungan	Mario D. Bondame Jr.
Rugao	1,245	Rural	11,315	Diosdado M. Bermudez	Justine D. Aquino
Salindingan	1,368	Rural	175	Danny T. Adorable	Jay Jay V. Mina
San Andres (Angarilla)	1,083	Rural	1,862	Richard A. Delfun	Chaesiefane D. Danguilan
San Felipe	1,490	Rural	8,815	Felimon Edwin J. Bayubay	Xyrille Clair M. Abad
San Ignacio (Canapi)	3,248	Rural	192	Silvino M. Sanchez	Joshua M. Ortiz
San Isidro	1,547	Rural	9,815	Marlon M. Sapongay	Jan Cliford L. Taguiam
San Juan	2,041	Rural	5,515	Rachelle D. Corpuz	Maricris C. Veloria
San Lorenzo	1,279	Rural	235	Edmundo A. Dela Cruz	Melfa C. Calautit
San Pablo	362	Rural	235	Marina E. Resureccion	Angel G. Almazan
San Rodrigo	1,354	Rural	235	Ferdinand Ancheta	Jerico C. Ammugauan
San Vicente	2,214	Urban	8,515	Marl Anthony P. Basco	Rafaelle Antonio Z. Añes
Santa Barbara	1,107	Urban	4,615	Jomar T. Cagayan	Dominic Ian Joshua B. Garcia
Santa Catalina	991	Rural	390	Freddie T. Peralta	Vernie A. Vega
Santa Isabel Norte	2,428	Rural	190	Leonera L. Uy	Maria Luisa V. Loñez
Santa Isabel Sur	5,002	Urban	190	Joseph A. Uy Jr.	Errol John R. Nebalasca
Santa Victoria	1,609	Rural	135	Lodivico L. Balbin	Jazel Joy S. Esteban
Santo Tomas	1,021	Rural	190	Randyson R. Castillo	Mark Anthony Yago
Siffu	1,533	Rural	135	Ismael G. Jimenez	Melanie A. Rosiete
Sindon Bayabo	2,455	Rural	135	Levy Z. Mateo	Jaylord G. Bumanglag
Sindon Maride	732	Rural	135	Jonathan P. Crisphine	Zaldy T. Cabato
Sipay	544	Rural	112	Donato B. Pascua	Lovely Joy D. Cabanilla
Tangcul	1,297	Rural	290	Jomar Cabaccan	Leogene Lloyd S. Nicolas
Villa Imelda (Maplas)	1,357	Rural	135	Maxvel B. Benzal	Fernando D. Dumaya

^{*Italicized names are former names, except for Barangays Cabeseria 2 to Cabeseria 27 where their names can be interchanged or both are used respectively.}

== See also ==
- List of schools in Ilagan
