= Ilagan Japanese Tunnel =

World War II military tunnel in Isabela, Philippines

- Ilagan City, Isabela in Philippines
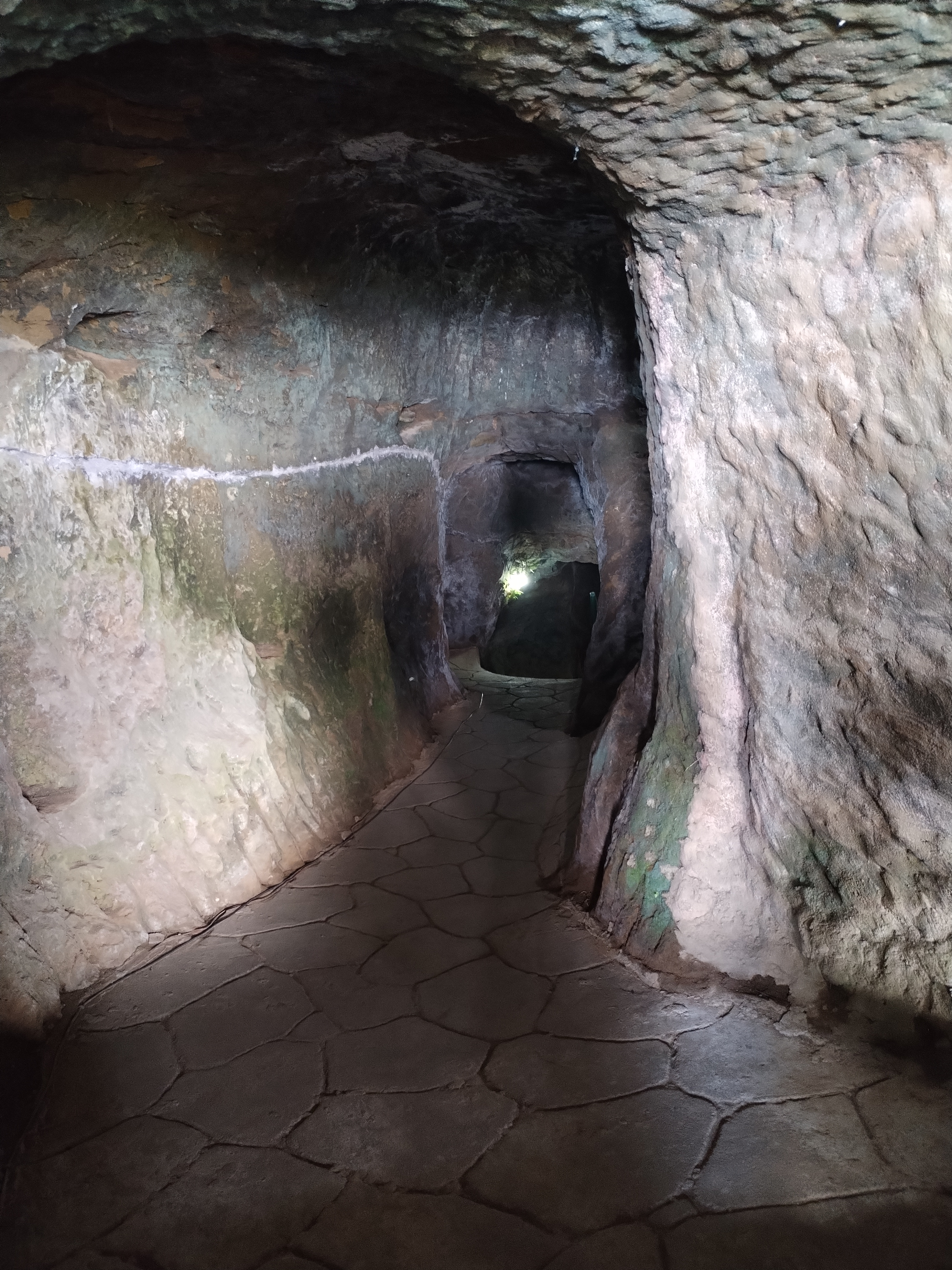

Site information
- Open to the public: February 16, 2016
- Condition: Not used by the military, converted to a tourism site

Location
- Coordinates: 17°08′26″N 121°53′15″E
- Height: 12 feet
- Length: 40 meters

Site history
- Battles/wars: World War II

The Ilagan Japanese Tunnel is a war tunnel that was part of a military base built by the Japanese government as headquarters for its soldiers during World War II. It is found in barangay Santo Tomas in Ilagan, Isabela. It is one of the few remaining tunnels in the province. It measures about 40 meters in length and slightly over three meters in width and height. The real size of the tunnel, however, has yet to be determined as the site has yet to be fully checked and explored.
