= DOST Hybrid Electric Road Train =

Filipino experimental transit unit

Hybrid Electric Road Train (HERT)
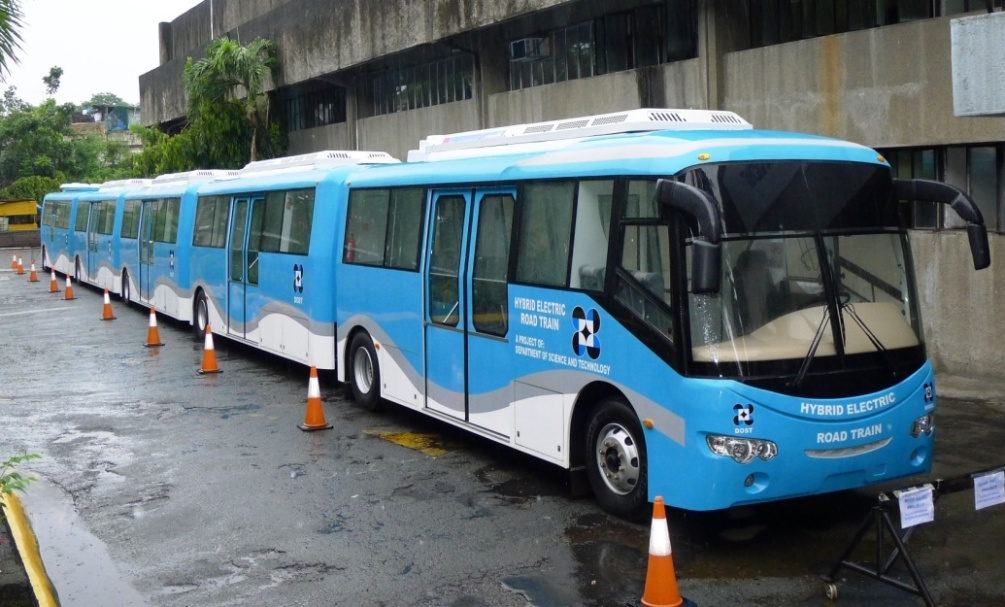
- Designer: DOST–MIRDC
- Formation: 5 cars consisting of 1 power car and 4 passenger cars
- Capacity: 240 passengers

Specifications
- Train length: 40 m (130 ft)
- Doors: 1 double-sliding door on each car
- Maximum speed: 50 km/h (31 mph)
- Weight: 10 t (10,000 kg)
- Transmission: Hybrid diesel-electric
- HVAC: Air-conditioning units
- Braking system(s): Regenerative

The Hybrid Electric Road Train (HERT) is a hybrid trackless train developed by the Department of Science and Technology of the Philippines for public transport. The headquarter office is located at New Clark City under the town of Capas, Tarlac, Philippines.

== Background ==
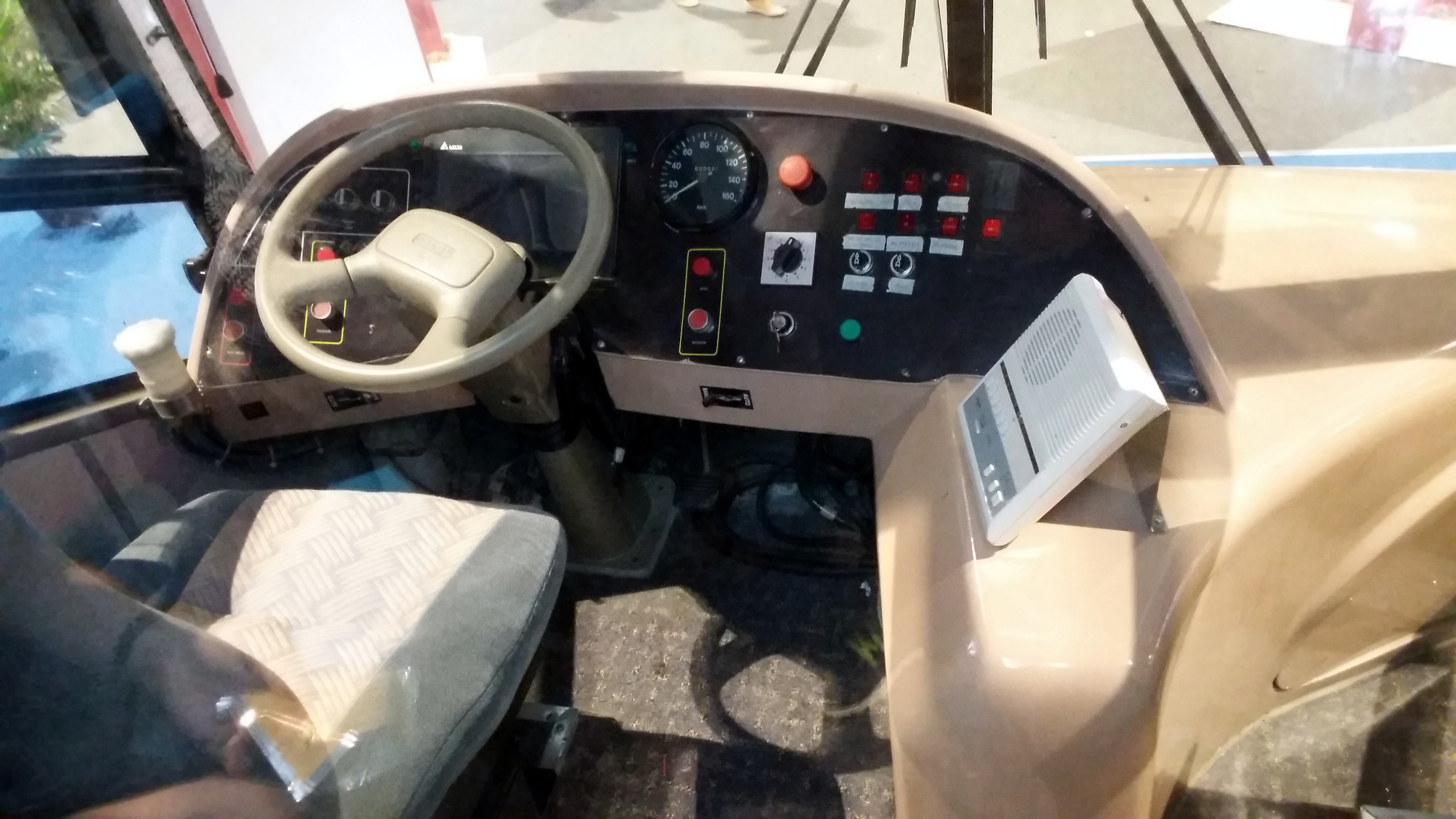
Driver's cab.

The Hybrid Electric Road Train (HERT) was developed by the Metals Industry Research and Development Center (MIRDC) of the Department of Science and Technology (DOST), and is part of the science agency's Advanced Transport Program under the Makina at Teknolohiya Para Sa Bayan (MakiBayan; transl. Machinery and Technology for the Nation) Program. It was designed by Filipino engineers using locally available parts. It was meant to be an alternative to the mass transport system in metropolitan areas experiencing heavy traffic congestion.

On August 11, 2021, the DOST signed an agreement with an Ilagan-based consortium for the manufacturing of the HERT in Isabela.

== Specifications ==
The Hybrid Electric Road Train consists of five interlinked coaches with air-conditioning and runs on a combination of diesel fuel and electrical power via a 260-battery generator. Described as a "road train", the HERT operates on roads and does not run on railways. It measures 40 m (130 ft) long, and has a maximum speed of 50 km/h (31 mph). Four of the train's coaches are meant for transporting passengers while a lone coach hosts the engine. Each coach has a capacity of 60 people for a total capacity of 240 passengers per trip. The HERT devises a regenerative brake.

There are two variants of the Hybrid Electric Road Train: the 160-passenger variant and the bigger 240-passenger variant.

== Operational history ==
The Hybrid Electric Road Train was officially launched by the DOST on August 22, 2014. and had its "soft launching" at the Clark Freeport Zone on June 25, 2015 at the Clark Freeport Parade Ground, where it was tested.

In May 2015, the representatives of local government of Cebu City and the DOST signed a memorandum of understanding to work on the integration of the HERT into the city's public transport system. It was also demonstrated during the opening day of the National Science and Technology Week in Pasay in July 2015.

By 2016, the train with modifications has already been adopted by the Clark Development Corporation to serve employees of its 1,000 business locators at the Clark Freeport and Special Economic Zone. On February 5, 2016, the train was demonstrated as part of EDSA Evolution, a road-sharing project by the Bayanihan sa Daan Movement and various government agencies. As part of the demonstration, passengers were transported from the SM Mall of Asia in Pasay to the Museo Pambata at the Luneta Park in Manila.

The HERT had its maiden demonstration run in General Santos on November 15, 2017 as a prelude to a trial run of the vehicle for as long as five months.

== See also ==
- DOST Hybrid Electric Train
