= Gov. Faustino N. Dy, Sr. Memorial Hospital =

Government hospital in Isabela, Philippines

- Provincial Government of Isabela
- Location within Luzon Location within Philippines

Geography
- Location: Brgy. Calamagui 2nd, Ilagan, Isabela, Philippines
- Coordinates: 17°07′55″N 121°52′08″E

Organization
- Care system: Philippine Health Insurance Corporation (PhilHealth) accredited
- Type: Secondary

Services
- Standards: Philippine Department of Health
- Emergency department: Yes
- Beds: 100-200

History
- Founded: 1939

The Gov. Faustino N. Dy, Sr. Memorial Hospital (GFNDSMH) is a government-operated hospital located in Calamagui 2nd, Ilagan, Isabela, created by virtue of an act of the Philippine National Assembly in 1939. It is a 100 to 200-bed capacity secondary hospital operated by the provincial government of Isabela.

== History ==
The Isabela Provincial Hospital was created by virtue of an act of the National Assembly of the Philippines in 1939, thereby giving way for the construction of the main building in 1940, which was not completed due to the outbreak of the Second World War in 1941.

On 15 August 1945, Dr. Jose Valdez, who was the head of the Philippine Civilian Affairs unit (PCAU), turned over the hospital with all supplies, equipment, medical and nursing staff and other personnel who were providing basic medical and surgical supplies and ward operating and dispensary equipment to the government, which operated the hospital under the Bureau of Health. Because of budgetary constraints, personnel were reduced leaving a skeletal force to continue its operation with Dr. Rodolfo B. Silvestre as acting Chief of Hospital until 11 March 1946.

On 12 March 1946, Dr. Victorino L. Vergara, was appointed as the 1st Chief of Hospital and in 1947, the hospital was transferred to the Department of Health. During his administration, he was able to tap the support of the provincial government, which gave allocated 5 units of prefabricated buildings for the hospital. These were used for the construction of the operating room, and OB-Gyne buildings that could accommodate about 12 beds. With the presence of an operating room and the availability of ample medical, surgical supplies and simple equipment, it could already meet the demand for common procedure. Construction of an out-patient department, dental and administrative office followed. Vergara retired in 1960 and was replaced by Dr. Jesus Maddela.

On the other hand, the FOA, MSA, and ICAS of the United States provided free hospital beds, cabinets, chairs, tables, generator unit and other technical support which the provincial government could not provide. Realizing the vital support of the provincial government, a new operating room and OB-Gyne building that can accommodate 12 beds was constructed and the old one was converted into emergency rooms and bedrooms, along with a medicare room.

The hospital started from 25 beds, thereby increasing the bed capacity to 100 in 1969 and as per directive from the office of the Secretary of Health, to became a teaching and training hospital. A dispensary, pharmacy, laboratory, X-ray laboratory, dental unit, administrative office and out-patient department was later constructed in order to accommodate the increase number of daily patients.

Under the administration of Dr. Maddela, additional improvements were achieved such as construction of ornamental lighting fixtures around the hospital compound and repair of Doctor's quarters. As a result, the hospital was judged as the best in Cagayan Valley by the Regional Health Office in Tuguegarao and at the same time the cleanest government hospital in the Philippines by the Committee on Clean-up Week in 1964. Due to continued increase in the occupancy rate, there was a need to decongest the overcrowded rooms, thus the construction of the contagious pavilion in 1973 for patients to be isolated.

In 1998, under the administration of then-governor Benjamin G. Dy, a bigger tap of the line 4-storey hospital building was constructed in front of the provincial hospital building. In 2000, the Isabela Provincial Hospital was relocated to the new hospital building and was renamed Gov. Faustino N. Dy, Sr. Memorial Hospital in honor of the province's longest-serving governor under SP. Resolution No. 0168.

The hospital received Level II accreditation from the Philippine Health Insurance Corporation.
