= Fuyot Springs National Park =

National park in the Philippines

- Isabela Sanctuary
- IUCN category V (protected landscape/seascape)
- Location within Philippines
- Location: Isabela, Philippines
- Nearest city: Ilagan City, Isabela, Philippines
- Coordinates: 17°4′N 122°0.02′E
- Area: 819 hectares (2,020 acres)
- Established: October 8, 1938
- Governing body: Department of Environment and Natural Resources; City Government of Ilagan

Fuyot Springs National Park is a protected area of the Philippines located in the mountain slopes of Barangay Santa Victoria in Ilagan City, Isabela, 405 kilometers northeast from Manila. The park, which also contains the Ilagan Sanctuary, is 819 hectares in area and extends to the nearby municipality of Tumauini. It was established in 1938 through Proclamation No. 327.

The park is a popular draw for hikers, mountaineers, spelunkers and birdwatchers who come to explore its mountain trails, caves, odd rock formations and aviary. Adjacent to the park lies the larger Northern Sierra Madre Natural Park which contains even more diverse wildlife. The Pinzal Falls is another major draw inside the park and provides relaxation to visitors aside from the park's many natural mountain springs.

== Recreation ==
The Ilagan Sanctuary offers the following attractions for visitors: a mini-zoo, butterfly park, natural spring water pool and ATV rides. During the celebration of 326th years of Ilagan's founding anniversary in May 2012, the government inaugurated the 350-meter zipline inside the park. The park's Main Cave, Altar Cave and Adventure Cave also offer exploration tours to visitors.

== See also ==
- List of national parks of the Philippines
