= Ilagan =

Capital city of Isabela, Philippines

- Component city
- City of Ilagan
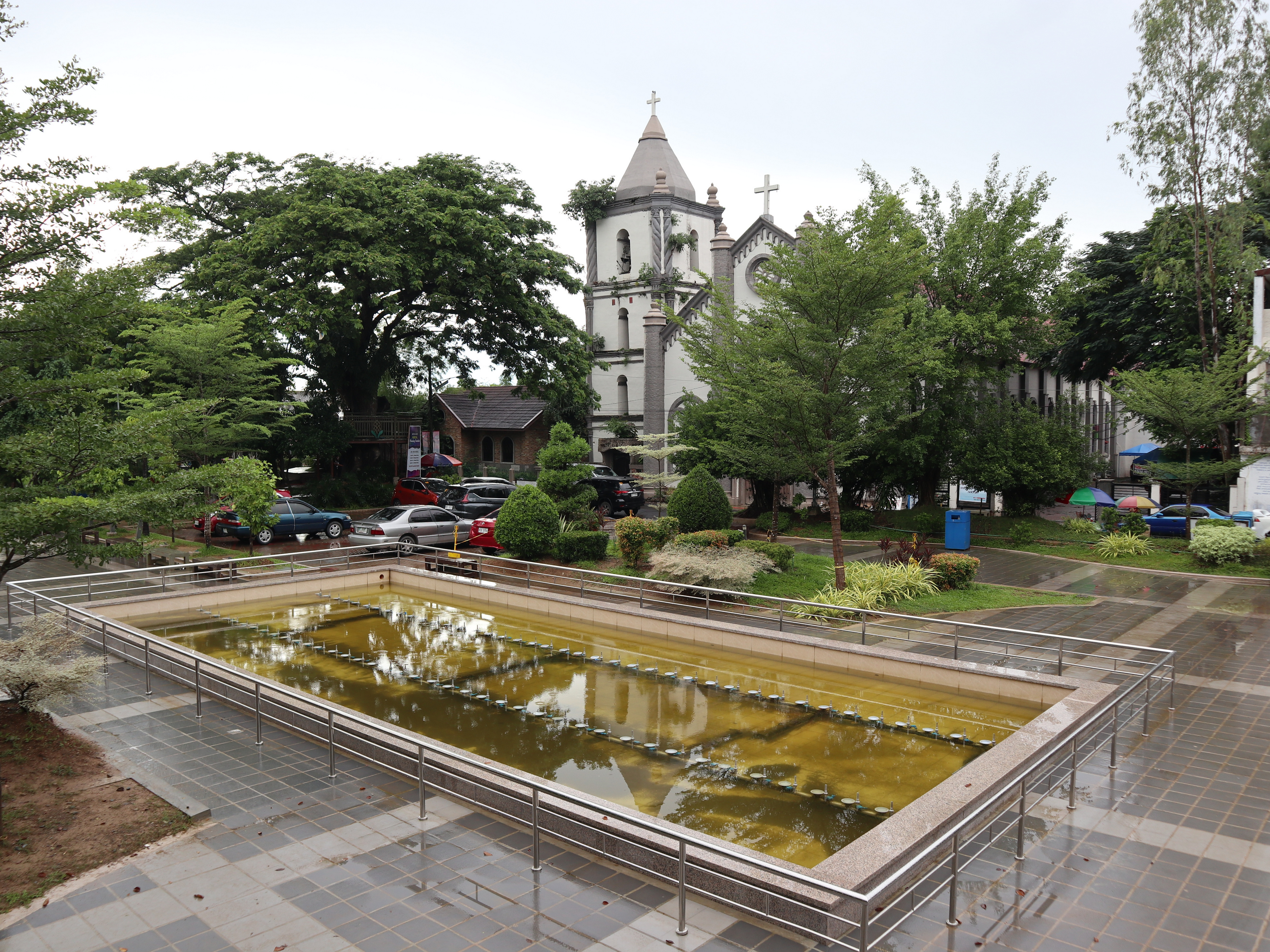
- Ilagan Rizal Park

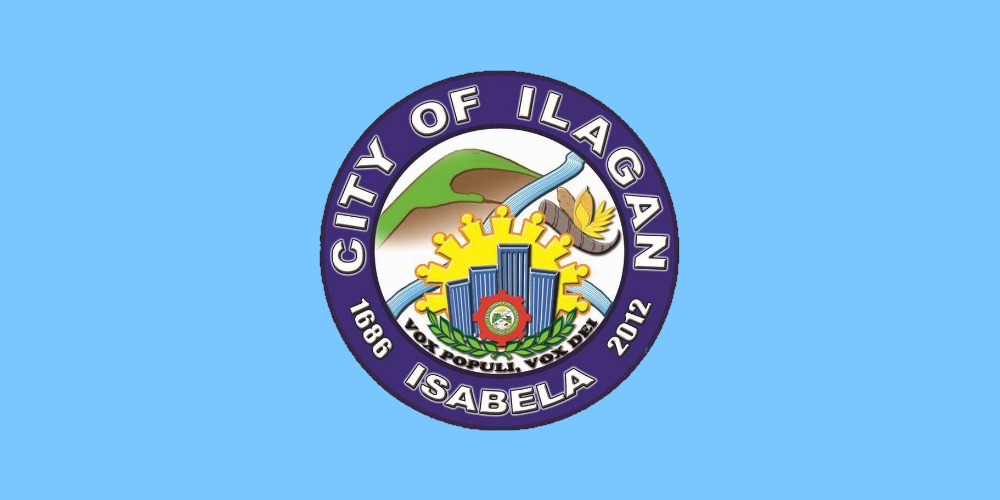
- Flag Seal
- Nicknames: Center of Eco-Tourism Adventure in Region 2; Home of the World's Largest Wooden Lounge Chair (Butaka); Sports Tourism Hub of the North; Corn Capital of the Philippines
- Motto(s): Sulong Pa! Lungsod ng Ilagan (More Progress! City of Ilagan)
- Anthem: City of Ilagan Hymn (formerly, Martsa ng Ilagan (Ilagan March))
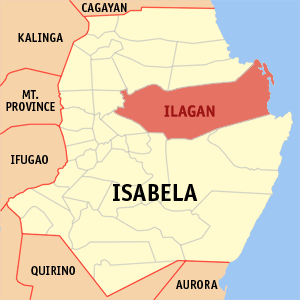
- Map of Isabela with Ilagan highlighted
- Interactive map of Ilagan
- Location within the Philippines
- Coordinates: 17°08′56″N 121°53′22″E
- Country: Philippines
- Region: Cagayan Valley
- Province: Isabela
- District: 1st district
- Founded: May 4, 1686
- Cityhood: August 11, 2012
- Barangays: 91 (see Barangays)

Government
  - Type: Sangguniang Panlungsod
  - Mayor: Josemarie L. Diaz
  - Vice Mayor: Jay Eveson C. Diaz
  - Representative: Antonio T. Albano
  - City Council: Members: Rachel Villanueva; Kit Bello; Harold Olalia; Joji Borromeo; Lillian Bringas; Antonio Manaligod Jr.; Rolly Tugade; Perly Gaoiran; Gaylor Malunay; Bic-Bic Albano
  - Electorate: 105,526 voters (2025)

Area
  - Total: 1,166.26 km^{2} (450.30 sq mi)
- Elevation: 139 m (456 ft)
- Highest elevation: 1,388 m (4,554 ft)
- Lowest elevation: 24 m (79 ft)

Population (2024 census)
  - Total: 164,020
  - Density: 140.64/km^{2} (364.25/sq mi)
  - Households: 39,663
- Demonym(s): Ilagueño (m); Ilagueña (f)

Economy
  - Income class: 1st city income class
  - Poverty incidence: 12.02% (2023)
  - Revenue: ₱ 2,810 million (2024)
  - Assets: ₱ 8,891 million (2024)
  - Expenditure: ₱ 2,303 million (2024)
  - Liabilities: ₱ 3,143 million (2024)

Service provider
  - Electricity: Isabela 2 Electric Cooperative (ISELCO 2)
  - Water: Metro Ilagan Water
- Time zone: UTC+8 (PST)
- ZIP code: 3300
- PSGC: 0203114000
- IDD : area code: +63 (0)78
- Native languages: Ibanag; Ilocano; Tagalog
- Patron saint: Saint Ferdinand of Castile
- Website: cityofilagan.gov.ph

Ilagan, officially the City of Ilagan (Ibanag: Siudad nat Ilagan; Ilocano: Siudad ti Ilagan; Filipino: Lungsod ng Ilagan), is a component city and capital of the province of Isabela, Philippines. According to the 2024 census, it has a population of 164,020 people, making it the most populous city in the province and second in the region after Tuguegarao City. As of 2025, it also had the highest number of voters in the province, with 105,526 voters.

It is dubbed as the corn capital of the Philippines, and the home of the country's largest armchair locally known as butaka.

== Etymology ==
According to Fr. Julian Malumbres, Ilagan derived its name from the word laga, an Ibanag word for "smallpox", of which there was an outbreak during the town's founding in 1686.

== History ==
Historical affiliations

Spain 1587–1898
United States of America 1898–1942
Japan 1942–1945
Philippines 1946–present

=== Early history ===
The town was then known by its native Gaddang settlers as Bolo during the pre-Spanish conquest era. It was one of the populous settlements during that period and the site of the vast tobacco plantation in the region making it one of the most important economic areas in northern Luzon.

=== Spanish colonial era ===
In 1581, Governor-General Gonzalo Ronquillo de Peñalosa sent Capt. Juan Pablo Carreon to explore Cagayan Valley as well as to establish missions. Among the Spanish missionaries who penetrated deeply into the region was Pedro Jimenez, who founded Ilagan.

The town of Bolo was founded by the Dominicans in 1619 in honor of Saint Ferdinand of Castile. The old Bolo was situated on the western side of Cagayan River in what is known today as Naguilian-Baculod. The cultural shock brought by the dominating social and economic regulations introduced by the Spanish authorities propelled the natives to dissent in the Mallig and the Ilagan-Tumauini territories in what was known as the Gaddang Revolution. The natives abandoned their settlement after burning their church and houses until 1622 when the Spanish government pardoned and exempted them from paying tribute within three years. After the Gaddang revolt, the natives re-established their settlement upon the efforts of Fr. Pedro Jimenez in 1678 on the east side of the river thereby giving the legendary name for Ilagan which is the reverse of the word nagali meaning move or transfer. The Dominicans accepted the settlement as an ecclesiastical mission given the name San Fernando de Ilagan in honor of its patron, Saint Ferdinand of Castile.

==== Foundation ====
On May 4, 1686, Ilagan was founded and missionaries converted the natives to Catholicism. Ilagan was made the capital town of Cagayan Valley when Brig. Manuel Sanchez Mira was then the governor of the whole territory.

In 1763, Ilagan was the scene of the revolt led by Dabo and Juan Marayag against the collection of tribute, the enforcement of tobacco monopoly committed by the friars during the Spanish colonization.

On May 1, 1856, Ilagan became the capital town when Isabela de Luzon was founded.

=== American colonial era ===
Present-day Ilagan is an area that was detached from the old province of Nueva Vizcaya. The first municipal president of the town, Rafael Maramag, added luster to the history of his hometown by becoming the first governor of the province of Isabela after its reorganization by the Americans in 1901.

On August 4, 1901, the American occupation under the United States-Philippine Commission enacted the Provincial Government Act 210 that re-established Isabela and other provinces in the Philippines. Rafael Maramag, a former municipal president (mayor) of Ilagan was appointed as the first governor. The act then re-established Ilagan as the provincial capital.

On November 13, 1925, Gaffud approved a resolution filed by all Municipal Presidents of the Isabela (the counterpart of the present-day Mayor's League) following a four-day convention. The resolution called for the erection of a monument in honor of the country's National Hero José Rizal in the public plaza.

=== Japanese occupation ===
The fortunes of Isabela as a province and Ilagan as a town followed a similar path to the rest of the country's history as a commonwealth nation and as a free republic in 1942, the Japanese occupation, liberation, political and military independence to this day.

On June 19, 1945, Ilagan was liberated from the Japanese Army as part of the liberation campaign with the combined forces of 14th Infantry, United States Army Forces in the Philippines – Northern Luzon (USAFIP-NL), under the command of Lt Col. Romulo A. Manriquez, and the 37th Division of the U.S. Sixth Army against the Japanese.

During this era, a man-made tunnel was constructed from the sweat and blood of detained Ilagueños and it is now a tourist destination in the city. The tunnels are believed to have served as headquarters of the Japanese soldiers.

=== The Postwar era ===
By the turn of the 1950s, the new Poblacion was located uphill from the old Saint Ferdinand Parish Church, formerly known as Saint Ferdinand Cathedral in Bagumbayan to San Vicente, which is the site of the current City Hall.

=== The Martial Law era ===
When Ferdinand Marcos' September 1972 declaration of Martial law began 14 years of authoritarian rule, the province of Isabela, including the municipality of Ilagan became a center of both conflict and protest when Marcos cronies Danding Cojuangco and Antonio Carag managed to block a Spanish-era grant which was supposed to see the return of Hacienda San Antonio and Hacienda Santa Isabel in Ilagan to local farmers. Cojuangco and Carag purchased the two haciendas themselves, displacing tens of thousands of farmers who were supposed to get those lands back a hundred years after the Spanish acquired them.

In its desire to serve its parishioners, the Roman Catholic Diocese of Ilagan hosted a Social Action Center which would help the farmers. In the Social Action Center's newsletter, the "Courier," researcher Sabino Padilla Jr. documented and exposed the ways by which Cojuangco, Carag, the provincial government, and the military harassed the farmers who were supposed to get the land. This all led to a protest march in joined by 12,000 protesters from all over Isabela, and eventually, for 4,000 farmers to finally get the titles to their land. But it also earned the ire of the administration.

In 1982, Padilla and 12 others were arrested by the regime and jailed under poor conditions at the Bayombong, Nueva Vizcaya Stockade of the Philippine Constabulary until almost the end of the Marcos regime.

In 1983, soldiers went as far as to raid the residence of the Bishop of Ilagan, Miguel Purugganan, in search of alleged rebels and firearms. They found none but continued to keep Bishop Puruggananan and the church workers under him under military surveillance.

=== Cityhood ===
On February 2, 1998, congress passed Republic Act 8474 which sought to convert Ilagan into a city. But the plebiscite held on March 14, 1999, turned down its bid for cityhood. The majority of the people voted no in that event under the mayoralty of Mercedes P. Uy.

On March 2, 2005, House bill no. 3847 was filed and approved by the house and transmitted for the cityhood of Ilagan but remained pending concurrence in the senate. The bill did not go through when mayor Delfinito C. Albano was gunned down by three unidentified men in the night of June 27, 2006, in Quezon City. The campaign used the term C-U-DAD Ilagan for the cityhood status of Ilagan.

On February 27, 2012, Ilagan renewed its bid for cityhood as sponsored by House bill no. 5917. Local officials of the town expressed support for the town's conversion into a city. On May 22, 2012, the congress approved the cityhood bill of Ilagan on its House resolution no. 144 and was signed by then President Benigno Aquino III on June 21, 2012. Plebiscite was held on August 11, 2012, with a majority of votes voting yes under the leadership of Josemarie L. Diaz. By virtue of Republic Act 10169, Ilagan was then proclaimed as a new component city, the third in the province of Isabela and the fourth in Cagayan Valley on the same day by COMELEC Commissioner Armando Velasco.

2012 Ilagan Cityhood Plebiscite
Choice	Votes	%
For	54,512	95.81
Against	2,386	4.19
Total	56,898	100.00
Valid votes	56,898	99.69
Invalid/blank votes	177	0.31
Total votes	57,075	100.00
Registered voters/turnout	83,511	68.34
Source: Plebiscite result from the COMELEC via Inquirer.

=== Contemporary ===
On August 28, 2019, the city government created the Ilagan Development Authority (ILAGANDA) which is aimed to transform Ilagan into a liveable city in the year 2030.

On November 25–26, 2023, the City of Ilagan hosted the biggest and largest serbisyo caravan in the country, the Bagong Pilipinas Serbisyo Fair held at the City of Ilagan Sports Complex and Isabela National High School. The event saw the first time that the BPSF program went to Cagayan Valley, marking its eighth installment nationwide. With the aim of the national government delivering quality services closer to clients. Among the lined-up activities are Rise Up Financing, Online Business Name Registration, Barangay Micro Business Name Registration, One Town, One Product (OTOP) Mini Fair, Diskwento Caravan, Product Standard Showcase, and Negosyo Center Business Counseling Services. Under the initiative, Isabela residents received P152 million worth of cash, while a total of P500 million went to programs and services. The program benefited at least 100,000 recipients, with a total of 26 government agencies participating in the event, providing over 195 services.

Among the services included is the Department of Social Welfare and Development’s (DSWD) Assistance to Individuals in Crisis Situations (AICS) program, which provided a provincial wide payout in the three cities and 34 municipalities of the province of Isabela. AICS assisted more than 42,000 individuals amounting to a total of P140 million in payout which included assistance for Agrarian Reform Beneficiaries (ARBs), Persons with Disabilities (PWDs), Indigenous Peoples (IPs), teachers, the transport sector, and fishermen; and collaborate with partner agencies.

The BPSF also included other province-wide activities such as scholarship programs from the Technical Education and Skills Development Authority (TESDA) and the Commission on Higher Education (CHED). Other activities included livelihood assistance for various sectors in pre-identified eligible recipients across Isabela. The Department of Health (DOH) shared their Lab for All program, or the giving of free medical services closer to the people. While the Department of Agriculture (DA), spearheaded the distribution of financial assistance for farmers, seeds and fertilizers, and farm equipments and machineries.

Products of farmers and fishermen were also on sale through the KADIWA ng Pangulo as a way to promote locally produced products. All of the products displayed were made affordable, fresh, and pesticide-safe for the consumers. The Bureau of Fisheries and Aquatic Resources (BFAR) also turned over fish cages, fish feeds, and fingerlings for the distribution and sale of seafood. Agencies like the Department of Agrarian Reform (DAR), Department of Labor and Employment (DOLE), Department of Science and Technology (DOST), Department of Environment and Natural Resources (DENR), Philippine Coconut Authority (PCA), National Food Authority (NFA), and the Public Attorney's Office (PAO) also provided livelihood, legal, and other relevant social services to the recipients. Other regulatory functions of the Philippine National Police (PNP), Department of Foreign Affairs (DFA), Land Transportation Office (LTO), National Bureau of Investigation (NBI), Philippine Statistics Authority (PSA), Professional Regulation Commission (PRC), Social Security System (SSS), PhilHealth, Government Service Insurance System (GSIS), and the Bureau of Internal Revenue (BIR) also extended their programs and services during the two-day caravan.

== Geography ==
The city is located in the central portion of the province of Isabela. It is bounded by nine municipalities: on the north by the municipalities of Divilacan, Tumauini, and Delfin Albano; on the west by the municipality of Quirino; on the east by the municipalities of Divilacan and Palanan, and the Pacific Ocean; and on the south by the municipalities of Gamu, Naguilian, Benito Soliven and San Mariano.

With a total land area of 116,626 hectares (288,190 acres), it is the largest city on the island of Luzon and the fourth largest city in land area in the Philippines, after Davao City, Puerto Princesa, and Zamboanga City.

Ilagan is situated 437.52 kilometers (271.86 mi) north of capital Manila (linked by a national highway via Santa Fe, Nueva Vizcaya).

=== Barangays ===
Ilagan City is politically subdivided into 91 barangays, the highest number of barangays in the province. Each barangay consists of puroks and some have sitios.

Currently, 13 barangays in the city are considered urban (highlighted in bold). Barangays are grouped into four clusters, namely Poblacion, Eastern, Western, and San Antonio.

- Aggasian
- **Alibagu**
- Alinguigan 1st
- Alinguigan 2nd
- Alinguigan 3rd
- Arusip
- **Baculud (Poblacion)**
- Bagong Silang
- **Bagumbayan (Poblacion)**
- **Baligatan**
- Ballacong
- Bangag
- Batong-Labang
- Bigao
- Cabannungan 1st
- Cabannungan 2nd
- Cabeseria 2 (Dappat)
- Cabeseria 3 (San Fernando)
- Cabeseria 4 (San Manuel)
- Cabeseria 5 (Baribad)
- Cabeseria 6 and 24 (Villa Marcos)
- Cabeseria 7 (Nangalisan)
- Cabeseria 8 (Santa Maria)*
- Cabeseria 9 and 11 (Capogotan)
- Cabeseria 10 (Lupigui)
- Cabeseria 14 and 16 (Casilagan)
- Cabeseria 17 and 21 (San Rafael)
- Cabeseria 19 (Villa Suerte)
- Cabeseria 22 (Sablang)
- Cabeseria 23 (San Francisco)
- Cabeseria 25 (Santa Lucia)
- Cabeseria 27 (Abuan)
- Cadu
- **Calamagui 1st**
- **Calamagui 2nd**
- Camunatan
- Capellan
- Capo
- Carikkikan Norte
- Carikkikan Sur
- Centro - San Antonio
- **Centro Poblacion**
- Fugu
- Fuyo
- Gayong-Gayong Norte
- Gayong-Gayong Sur
- **Guinatan**
- **Imelda Bliss Village**
- Lullutan
- Malalam
- Malasin (Angeles)
- Manaring
- Mangcuram
- Marana I
- Marana II
- Marana III
- Minabang
- Morado
- Naguilian Norte
- Naguilian Sur
- Namnama
- Nanaguan
- **Osmeña (Sinippil)**
- Paliueg
- Pasa
- Pilar
- Quimalabasa
- Rang-ayan (Bintacan)
- Rugao
- Salindingan
- San Andres (Angarilla)
- San Felipe
- San Ignacio (Canapi)
- San Isidro
- San Juan
- San Lorenzo
- San Pablo
- San Rodrigo
- **San Vicente (Poblacion)**
- **Santa Barbara (Poblacion)**
- Santa Catalina
- Santa Isabel Norte
- **Santa Isabel Sur**
- Santa Maria (Cabeseria 8)
- Santa Victoria
- Santo Tomas
- Siffu
- Sindon Bayabo
- Sindon Maride
- Sipay
- Tangcul
- Villa Imelda (Maplas)

As of December 31, 2022, the following barangays are considered urban: Alibagu, Baculud, Bagumbayan, Baligatan, Calamagui 1st, Calamagui 2nd, Centro Poblacion, Guinatan, Imelda Bliss Village, Osmeña, San Vicente, Santa Barbara, and Santa Isabel Sur.

=== Climate ===
Ilagan has a tropical savanna climate (Köppen Aw) with consistently hot temperatures year-round, a dry season from January to April, and a wet season from May to December.

Climate data for Ilagan
Month	Jan	Feb	Mar	Apr	May	Jun	Jul	Aug	Sep	Oct	Nov	Dec	Year
Mean daily maximum °C (°F)	29 (84)	30 (86)	32 (90)	35 (95)	35 (95)	35 (95)	34 (93)	33 (91)	32 (90)	31 (88)	30 (86)	28 (82)	32 (90)
Mean daily minimum °C (°F)	19 (66)	20 (68)	21 (70)	23 (73)	23 (73)	24 (75)	23 (73)	23 (73)	23 (73)	22 (72)	21 (70)	20 (68)	22 (71)
Average rainfall mm (inches)	31.2 (1.23)	23 (0.9)	27.7 (1.09)	28.1 (1.11)	113.5 (4.47)	141.4 (5.57)	176.4 (6.94)	236.6 (9.31)	224.9 (8.85)	247.7 (9.75)	222.9 (8.78)	178 (7.0)	1,651.4 (65)
Average rainy days	10	6	5	5	13	12	15	15	15	17	16	15	144
Source: World Weather Online

=== Land ===
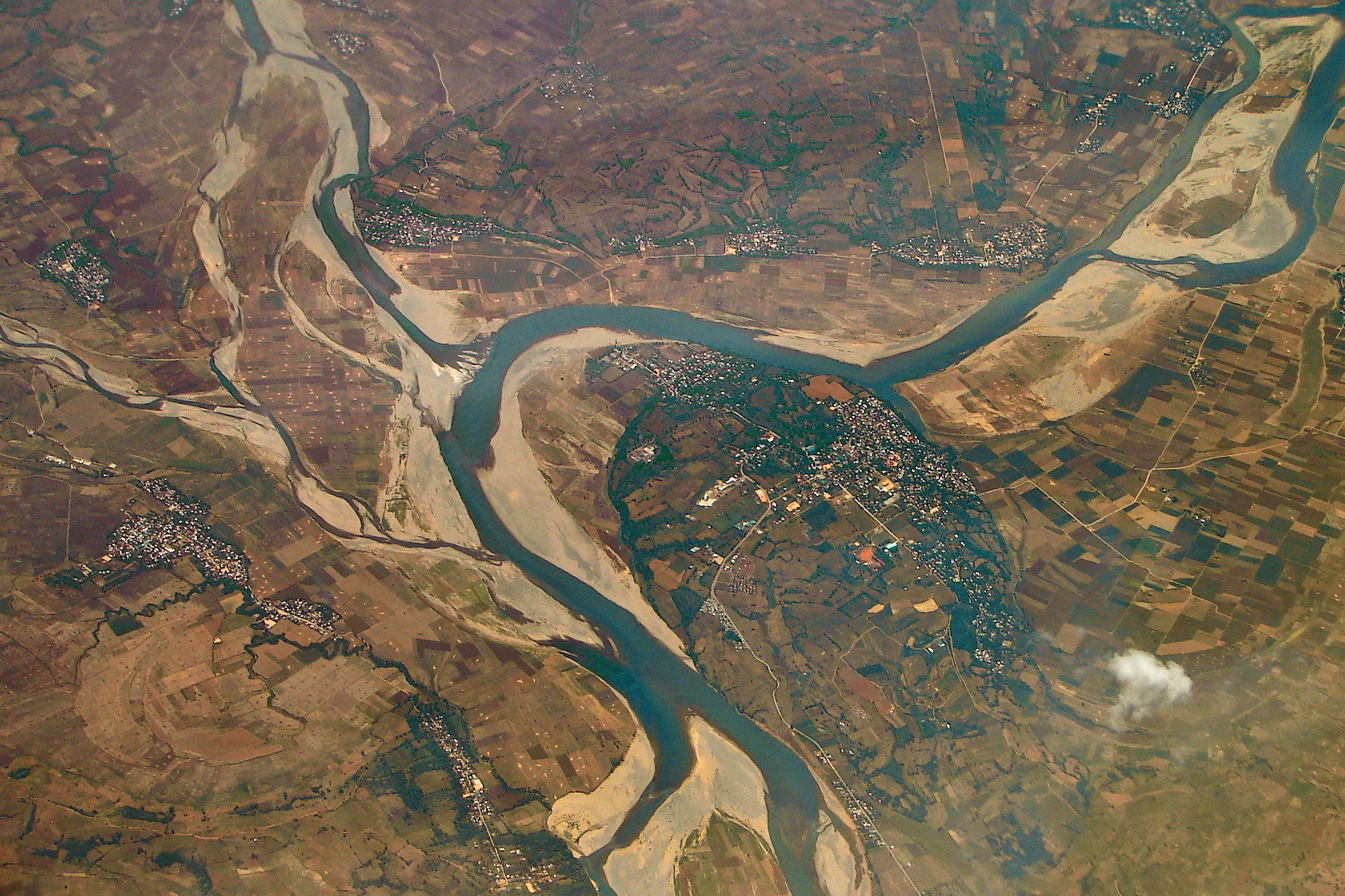
Ilagan River and Brgy. San Antonio, Ilagan City from above.

Of the total 1,166.26 km^{2} land area of Ilagan; 31% are agricultural, 36% are forest areas, and the remaining 33% are built-up areas and open grassland areas that are available for industrial, commercial and residential uses.

== Demographics ==
=== Ethnicity ===
Ilagueños today reflect a combination of indigenous, Chinese, and Hispanic descent. The core community was composed of tribes notably the Agta, Ibanag, Gaddang, Yogad, and Kalinga which mirrors the habitation of the Philippines believed to have started 26,000 years ago with various strains of Aetas, then Indonesians coming 5,000 years ago and the Malays in droves starting 200 years B.C. up to 1500 A.D. Trade and cultural relations with Chinese preceded the 16th-century incursion of the Spaniards. Ilocanos who already developed their own distinct traits were recorded to have migrated massively in the 19th century owing to the accessibility of the land and vast opportunities in the area straddling the present-day provinces of Cagayan and Nueva Vizcaya. It was proclaimed a province by a Royal Decree and named Isabela de Luzon on the first day of May in 1856.

=== Languages ===
There are three native languages in Ilagan: Ibanag, Ilocano, and Tagalog, which make it a multilingual city. English is used primarily in communication for government publications, local newsprints, road signs, and commercial signs, and in doing official business transactions in the city.

=== Population ===
As of the 2024 census, the population was 164,020 people, with a density of 140/km^{2} or 360/sq mi. Imelda Bliss Village remains the most populous barangay with 7,961 people while Carikkikan Sur is the least populous with just 223 people.

Population census of Ilagan

Year	Pop.	±% p.a.
1903	16,008	—
1918	23,447	+2.58%
1939	31,323	+1.39%
1948	35,384	+1.36%
1960	48,251	+2.62%
1970	62,118	+2.56%
1975	70,075	+2.45%
1980	79,336	+2.51%

Year	Pop.	±% p.a.
1990	99,120	+2.25%
1995	106,912	+1.43%
2000	119,990	+2.50%
2007	131,243	+1.24%
2010	135,174	+1.08%
2015	145,568	+1.42%
2020	158,218	+1.77%
2024	164,020	+0.87%

Source: Philippine Statistics Authority

The rapid increase of the population in Ilagan is attributed to the current growth of economic activities especially in the sectors of Commerce, Industry, Agriculture, and Housing. Ilagan is one of the emerging cities in the Philippines with more than 100,000 residents. Statistics from the Philippine Statistics Authority show that Ilagan had a population 131,24311 in 2007, which increased to 135,174 people in the 2010 census making Ilagan as the most populous city in the province of Isabela and the second in Cagayan Valley after Tuguegarao.

=== Religion ===
==== Catholicism ====
Ilagan's population is predominantly Roman Catholic. The Diocese of Ilagan has 39 catholic churches all over the province of Isabela. Its former seat was in Saint Ferdinand Parish, then it is now transferred to the Cathedral of Saint Michael the Archangel in Gamu, Isabela. The Saint Ferdinand Parish was built in a baroque style in 1612and is located in barangay Bagumbayan.

==== Others ====
There are also Protestants, Baptist, Church of Christ, Adventists, Born Again groups, Victory Christian Fellowship, Latter Day Saints, Jehovah's Witnesses, Islam, and Philippine-based groups like Iglesia ni Cristo, and Members Church of God International (MCGI) that account to the city's population. These religious organizations have their own temples and churches sparsely located in the city.

== Economy ==
Poverty incidence of Ilagan (%)

Source: Philippine Statistics Authority

At present, Ilagan has been one of the fastest-growing economies in the province of Isabela as well as in the whole Cagayan Valley over the past years. The city is the primary growth center and investment hub of the region due to the rapid commercialization and stabilization of the different sectors involved in its economy.

The transformation of Ilagan into a fast-growing city in Cagayan Valley became evident upon the assumption into office of then Mayor Josemarie L. Diaz, the re-structuring of the economic landscape of the city and the eventual transformation of its business climate into a business-friendly environment successfully lured multi-national companies in investing their capitals into its market. The economic boom began to engulf Ilagan with the entry of eight banks and financial institutions in just several months.

The Local Government of Ilagan responded positively to these developments by the enactment of legislative measures including the provision of the Investment Incentive Code which provided for tax incentives to investments. These measures eventually opened the floodgates for big investments to enter the local market that included the establishments of malls like the Xentro Mall (formerly called Northstar Mall) and Talavera Square Mall.

There are also thousands of commercial establishments composed of distributors, retail and wholesale. Pawnshops, lending companies, insurance agencies, cooperatives, and other financial institutions are spread all over the city.

=== Agriculture, fishery, and animal industry ===
Agriculture and fishery remain the main backbone of Ilagan's economy. There are almost 23,803 hectares that are cultivated land and 314 hectares are utilized for fish culture. However, the suitable farm area of Ilagan is 32,153.19 hectares with potential for crops, livestock, and fish production. This figure shows that a significant percentage (24.99%) is not being fully utilized for agricultural production leaving them idle and underutilized.

Most of the industries in the city are agri-based. For the last ten years, there has been a great number of local investment in poultry and hog raising. There are seven poultry contract growers and 33 small and medium-scale hog raisers in Ilagan. Other support facilities, warehouses, and small rice mills, strategically located in different barangays to address the storage needs of farmers during the harvest season.

Of all cities in the country, Ilagan ranks as the top producer of corn. As an agriculture-based city, it produces ample supply of corn, rice, vegetables, and legumes. Fruits like bananas are year-round products, especially in the mountainous areas of the city. Ilagan also produces seasonal fruits such as mangoes and pomelo.

The Cagayan Valley Research Center (CVRC) is an attached agency of the Department of Agriculture (DA) that serves as the primary plant breeding institution in Cagayan Valley. It is one of the Bureau of Agricultural Research’s active partners in research and development in the region. Ilagan has rich forest resources. Hectares of forest land are strictly protected by authorities like the Department of Environment and Natural Resources (DENR), several NGOs, and the Local Government Unit.

In 2018, the Department of Agriculture Regional Field Office No. 02 has pledged to intensify the promotion of mushroom production in Cagayan Valley through the establishment of the region's research and development center for the mushroom industry. The DA's Bureau of Agricultural Research (BAR) funded the construction of the Cagayan Valley Mushroom Research and Development Center which aims to support the agency's activities on processing of agricultural waste into sustainable and competitive mushroom production towards food security and safety in the region. The Department of Agriculture, through its research centers and experiment stations, had already initiated trainings on production and processing to interested farmers, cooperatives and local government units. The modern facility is located at the DA-Regional Crop Protection Center (RCPC). Its inauguration is part of DA-initiated Panagdadapun and first Makan Festival. It was done simultaneously with the inauguration of Luzon's first-of-a-kind Plant Genetic Resources (PGR) Center that was launched on May 16, 2018.

The Department of Agriculture Regional Field Office 2 (DA-RFO2) and the city government of Ilagan had agreed to establish an i-Corn Complex worth P199.2 million. The agreement was reached after a consultation meeting led by the DA Region 2 officials and representatives from other concerned government agencies. The Department of Agriculture will provide P107 million while the city government of Ilagan will provide P92.2 million for the said complex that will serve as a one-stop agri-commercial center once completed. The i-Corn Complex will serve Ilagueño corn farmers including those from Isabela and the rest of Cagayan Valley.

The establishment of the facility is also aimed to solve problems in corn production, particularly drying during the wet season. The construction of the corn complex is in support of the Agriculture and Fisheries Modernization Act (AFMA), which aims to strengthen the agri-fisheries sector in a modernized perspective to attain food security, poverty alleviation, income enhancement and profitability, global competitiveness, and sustainability. The complex is designed to be used as a post-harvest, processing, and research facility that will ensure product quality and thus boost the income of farmers. It is expected to be operational by February 2024 with the operation of the Corn Innovation Center whose construction and implementation started in August 2023. The mechanical drying facility as one of its components will help farmers cope with losses and damage during calamities. The city government donated a lot for the construction of corn complex facility.

The Corn Innovation Center is one of the flagship agri-support projects of the City Government of Ilagan's thrust for the next three years on food sufficiency and producing finished corn products as Ilagan affirms its Corn Capital title. The groundbreaking ceremony was held on July 12, 2022, led by top officials and executives of the city of government alongside officials and representatives from the Department of Agriculture Regional Office 2 and Bureau of Agricultural Research. The City Government of Ilagan pledged P10 Million as its counterpart, in addition to the P10 Million from the Department of Agriculture itself. The facility will be utilized as a training center for farmers. It is also envisioned to be the city's Tech-Hub Demonstration Center to showcase new technological advancements in corn processing and other commodities. The completion of its construction is set by the first quarter of 2024.

On December 2, 2020, then Agriculture Sec. William Dar attended the Inauguration of the P500 million 2,400 Sow level Swine Breeding Complex of the Thai-based Agro-Industrial Company, Charoen Pokphand Foods Philippines, Inc. in partnership with Sagittarian Agricultural Philippines. The Department of Agriculture also signed the Memorandum of Understanding with the City Government of Ilagan for the establishment of the P270 million Ilagan Corn Processing Center and a Memorandum of Agreement (MOA) for the implementation of the Urban Agriculture project. A joint venture of projects that is envisioned to transform the agricultural landscape of city and to support its farmers with their livelihood.

On June 20, 2023, the contract signing was held at the Ilagan City Hall for the Phase II of the 5,400 Sow level Swine Breeding Complex investment in Ilagan by Charoen Pokphand Foods Philippines, Inc., Thailand's largest agriculture conglomerate and homegrown investor Sagittarian Agricultural Philippines Incorporated. The initial capitalization of the joint venture was valued at around P1 billion and set to be completed by 2024. The groundbreaking ceremony of the said project was held on the same day.

Thai conglomerate Charoen Pokphand Group Company Ltd. through its Philippine subsidiary, Charoen Pokphand Foods Philippines, Inc. in partnership with homegrown company Sagittarian Agricultural Philippines, Inc. and the Land Bank of the Philippines is pouring in more than P1.8 billion worth of investments for the establishment of its huge animal feeds milling facility in Ilagan. The construction of the project is expected to begin by the 3rd quarter of 2024. The feed mill will be situated in a 10-hectare land that the company acquired. It will be the biggest feed mill of its kind in Northern Luzon as their Central Luzon operation is already saturated. Ilagan is known as the largest producer of yellow corn used for animal feed, earning its title as the Corn Capital of the Philippines in 2015. The average production of quality corn in Ilagan is at approximately 200,000 metric tons per year coming from its 33,500 hectares of production areas which will definitely compensate the minimum requirement for the raw materials needed by the feed mill once it becomes operational. The groundbreaking ceremony of the City of Ilagan Feed Mill Complex and the signing of the Memorandum of Agreement between Charoen Pokphand Foods, Sagittarian Agricultural Phils., Inc. and Kasetphand Group was held on May 17, 2024. This kind of joint venture between the government and private sector is essential for the delivery of basic services and business matching opportunities specifically for corn farmers who will be the primary recipient of the project. It also aims to generate more jobs and employment opportunities for Ilagueños and to spur development in the countryside.

Ilagan, known as the Corn Capital, boasts an annual corn production of 200,000 metric tons sourced from its expansive 33,500 hectares of cultivation areas. Additionally, the city yields 80,000 metric tons of rice annually from 15,000 hectares of rice fields, with fisheries contributing 250 metric tons per year from local rivers, streams, and fishponds. The dairy sector is burgeoning, evidenced by the emergence of dairy farms capable of producing 2,000 liters per hour of milk, attracting investments such as Mr. Moo Production Corporation's establishment of manufacturing facilities in the province.

=== Banks ===
As of April 15, 2024, Ilagan has a total of 22 banks with a total volume of bank deposits at ₱15.7 billion. Government banks such as Landbank of the Philippines (LBP), and Development Bank of the Philippines (DBP) are present in the city. Security Bank opened its 328th branch in this city.

=== Commerce and trade ===
There were even more establishments in 1995 with a total of 1,877 in all. The trend shows that from 1995 to 2000, there was a growth of 2.94%, but from 2000 to 2006 a decreasing growth rate of -1.75% was registered. For the year 2000, commercial trade was at 1,996 revealing that there were more or less than 201 establishments that had been closed down within the period 2000–2006. Commerce and trade are the second economic-based income of the people of Ilagan.

In the year 2006, statistics showed that there are currently 1,795 registered business establishments. Just like the past years, for the year 2006, commercial activities within the municipality are classified into wholesale, retail, and service-oriented businesses.

=== Food and beverage ===
There are several food and beverage companies in the city. The largest of which is the Coca-Cola Beverages Philippines, Inc. (CCBPI) which operates a softdrink bottling plant. Another is a vinegar and soy sauce fermentation company locally known as 'Best Choice', which is operated and owned by Robelly's Food Products and also the Jack Confectionery, which operates a wine fermentation plant. There are 15 bakeries/bakeshops and 1 ice cream/ice drop company. Aside from the increasing number of local cafés, restaurants, and several multi-national fast-food companies opened their respective branch[es] in the city.

Sagittarian Agricultural Philippines is a homegrown private agricultural company duly registered with the Securities and Exchange Commission. Established on July 18, 2016, with an initial line of business consisted of poultry production, hog-raising, fish production, and grains trading. In 2017, the company's rapid growth allowed it to expand its business into grains and meat processing, trucking, construction and real estate. The company currently operates a modern dressing plant and state-of-the-art machinery for grains processing. In 2018, it expanded its meat processing unit and launched several The Chicken Place food counter outlets within Ilagan and nearby towns. It is also the manufacturer and official distributor of frozen poultry products which include Dragon's Prime Juicy Delight and Super Fresh.

On March 14, 2024, the courtesy meeting and signing of the Memorandum of Understanding was held between the City Government of Ilagan and YCH Logistics Philippines, Inc. - IGLOO Supply Chain Philippines, Inc. for the construction of a 1-billion worth cold storage facility in Ilagan City. YCH-IGLOO is one of the best cold supply chain service provider in the Philippines and Asia Pacific Region. The joint venture between the two entities aims to provide the most cost efficient, quality and safe food handling supply chain solution in the city. It is expected to produce a domino effect in the different sectors at stake especially to manpower development, employment opportunities, expansion of agri-food processing, agro-industrial modernization and development, banking and finance, foreign direct investments, technology transfer, tourism, and compliance with the UNDP Sustainable Development Goals (SDG) - all in line with the vision of becoming a liveable city by 2030. On May 4, 2024, the groundbreaking ceremony and signing of the Framework Agreement between the City Government of Ilagan, Department of Agriculture Regional Office 02 and YCH Logistics Philippines was held during the 338th Aggaw na Ilagan celebration.

Mr. Moo's Dairy Products Incorporated is a Metro Manila-based dairy company that operates a dairy farm and manufacturing facility in Ilagan. It is an authorized distributor of a wide range of dairy products. The company purchases raw milk from local farmers and cooperatives to manufacture and produce their dairy products. On February 1, 2024, the company opened its first Mr. Moo's Milk Planet outlet in the city located along Maharlika Highway. The second outlet in Isabela was formally inaugurated on April 6, 2024, in Cauayan City.

=== Furniture making ===
One major industry is furniture making. Several furniture shops manufacture and sell furniture made of quality narra and gmelina wood once dubbed as "Butaka City" of Ilagan, where the Guinness Book of Records' entry for the biggest lounge chair in the world, the Butaka, was manufactured.

=== Industrial sector ===
The industrial sector of the municipal economy comprises 210 establishments in the year 2006 as compared with 207 in 2000. This reflects a 2.4% increase in industrial activities over six years (2000–2006). The existing industries are mostly on a micro-scale except for the Coca-Cola Bottlers Philippines, Inc. which is the only significant employment generator within the locality at that time. Following the previous year's trend, industries currently operating are agro-industries, wood-based manufacturing, or service-oriented industries.

The commercial area includes areas that are occupied by public markets, wholesale and retail stores, restaurants, banks, shops, and other establishments or structures engaged in commercial activities. The bulk of those who are engaged in trade and commerce are found in the public markets. The area covered by the commercial area is approximately 90.56 hectares or 2.62% of the urban core.

As compared to the 2000 existing commercial area of 17 hectares, the increase of 73.56 hectares in 2007 is an indication that Ilagan is racing towards commercialization.

=== Jeep and tricycle body building ===
There are nine motor vehicle assembly shops in Ilagan; five jeepney assembly shops and four tricycle side-car makers. These motor vehicle assembly shops respond to the increasing need for transportation services in the city.

=== Car dealership ===
On May 4, 2021, the local government officials and personnel of the Ilagan City Police Station attended the ribbon cutting and opening of the Mitsubishi Freeway Motors Sales Office. The establishment is the first sales office and showroom of its kind in the city.

=== Public markets ===
The city has two major public markets: the old Pamilihang Bayan ng Ilagan (now called Xentro Market) and the multi-million pesos New Ilagan Public Market Complex. In front of the public market is a three-story structure called Ilagan City Mall, the first LGU-owned and operated mall in the city. The increasing number of market-goers coming from the different regions of the city and adjacent municipalities prompted city officials to facilitate the construction of the modern market.

On November 23, 2023, the city government held the groundbreaking ceremonies of San Antonio Public Market and Marana 1st Public Market with an initial capitalization of P25 million and P50 million, respectively. Each public market is expected to cater residents from the far-flung barangays located in San Antonio Cluster and Eastern Cluster to spur growth and development in their respective communities. The target completion of the two public markets is set in 2024.

=== Real estate ===
Ilagan is home to numerous subdivisions which include Francisca Village, South Francisca Village, City Homes Subdivision, New Villa Jesusa Subdivision, Capitol Hills Subdivision, Richmond Hills Subdivision, California Homes Subdivision, Amurao Homes, Green Meadows Subdivision, Parkville Subdivision, St. Andrews Village, Big Prime Hills Exclusive Village, and Providers City San Felipe. These projects are owned by homegrown real-estate developers such as Brent Nathan Realty and Development Corporation, ITP Properties Corporation, Emmanuel Realty Services and Development Corporation, R.P. Alingog Development Corporation, CCL BIG Prime Hills, Vester Corporation and Providers Multi-Purpose Cooperative. On March 5, 2024, real estate giant, Ayala Land officially launched Greenlane Settings which is the first Avida Land development in the province of Isabela.

=== Retail industry ===
On March 19, 2021, home-grown retail giant Talavera Group of Companies expanded their presence in Ilagan with the opening of Talavera Hypermart and Homebuilders Depot located at the former Ilagan Bowling Alley.

On April 8, 2024, one of the leading and fastest-growing construction retail stores in the Philippines opened its 103rd CitiHardware store, the first in Ilagan as well as in the province of Isabela. It holds the title of being the company's largest store in the island of Luzon.

=== Textile industry ===
On June 23, 2023, the Department of Science and Technology - Philippine Textile Research Institute (DOST-PTRI), Isabela State University (ISU) - City of Ilagan Campus, DOST - Philippine Council for Industry, Energy and Emerging Technology Research and Development (DOST PCIEERD), DOST Region II, City Government of Ilagan, and the Provincial Government of Isabela inaugurated the P40 million Regional Yarn Production and Innovation Center in the province of Isabela. The production and innovation facility located at the Isabela State University (ISU) - City of Ilagan Campus is under the DOST-GIA project - DOST Inclusive Innovation Textiles Empowering Lives Anew or i2TELA Program, which is the first of its kind in Northern Luzon. The establishment of the facility is aimed to strengthen the local textile ecosystem and bridge the gaps in textile supply chain by enabling the conversion of natural raw materials into spinnable fibers for yarns from blends of natural fibers including abaca, banana, bamboo and pineapple leaf, in combination with cotton. It is designed to operate as a micro-scale yarn-spinning facility that can produce 50 kilograms of yarn per day, which is equivalent to 270 meters of handloom fabrics.

=== Tobacco industry ===
Ilagan became one of the largest producers of tobacco during the Spanish time. The tobacco monopoly caused the valley to languish in poverty from 1785 to 1797. The lifting of the monopoly was caused by the heavy loss incurred by the government. A royal decree was released in 1882 which aimed to abolish the monopoly and attracted foreign capitalists to invest in the country.

In Ilagan, the Compañía General de Tabacos de Filipinas also known as La Tabacalera was established in 1881 and produced the famous La Flor de la Isabela which was the largest company of its kind in the world at that time. The Tabacalera acquired two haciendas in Ilagan which were Hacienda San Antonio and Hacienda Santa Isabel. The majority of the western barangays of the municipality are planting tobacco other than rice, corn, and high-value crops. The National Tobacco Administration is the attached agency under the Department of Agriculture that is mandated to conduct series of efficacy trials, scientific experiments and tests on new agricultural products, inputs, systems, and processes being introduced. They recommend and certify the applicability and efficacy of the recommended tobacco technologies.

== Tourism ==
The city has various tourism sceneries, both natural and man-made, appealing to local and foreign tourists.

=== Natural attractions ===
Ilagan Sanctuary is a 200-hectare protected area located within the 819-hectare Fuyot Springs National Park along the foothills of the Sierra Madre mountain range. Attractions inside the park include prayer mountain, bird viewing, Butterfly park, animal kingdom (mini zoo), natural spring pool, boating & kayaking, wall-climbing & rappelling, cable car & tree-top adventure, 350-meter long & 700-meter high zipline, 1.5-kilometer hike to Pinzal Falls, and the 400-meter limestone caves. Some activities in the sanctuary will require you to ride on an all-terrain vehicle (ATV).

Abuan River is the main river of the Northern Sierra Madre Natural Park. It has an average elevation of 82 meters above sea level, and feeds the Abuan watershed in the city. Tourists and visitors can explore the diverse animal and plant life in one of the country's remaining lush virgin forests. On January 9, 2024, the city government of Ilagan ordered the temporary closure of Abuan River and its surrounding areas to all picnics and recreational activities to give way for its planned rehabilitation and development. On March 11, 2024, after more than a month since its closure, the officials of the city government led the reopening of the newly rehabilitated tourist spot. It was later on rebranded and renamed as Abuan River Adventure and Eco-Tourism Park. Additional facilities/amenities for water adventure rides like kayaks, boats, jet-ski, All-Terrain Vehicles (ATVs), paragliding, LED/solar lights, steel cottages and comfort rooms were added to lure more local tourists and visitors from neighboring towns and provinces.

Burmurbur Falls and Disupi Falls are small waterfalls both located in a secluded and far-flung area.

Kimmul-ong Falls and Kimmiskisan Falls are found in a remote area near the foothills of Sierra Madre mountain ranges, several kilometers away from the city proper. The area surrounding these fresh bodies of water can only be accessed by small vehicles or by walking/hiking.

=== Artificial attractions ===
Ilagan Japanese Tunnel is a former war tunnel and it served as the headquarters of a military base built by the Japanese during World War II and is about 40 meters by 3.66 meters wide but has yet to be fully scaled and explored.

Queen Isabela Park, also known as Skypark, is a public park whose centerpiece is the Queen Isabela II Monument, a sculpture of Queen Isabela II of Spain surrounded by sculptures of deceased Isabelan leaders and heroes.

Century Park is a triangular shaped park which is the location of a popular attraction called Banchetto Ilagan, which is usually frequented by locals and visitors especially when the city government transforms the area into a Christmas-themed village during the holiday season.

The Mammangi Park (formerly called DBP Triangle) is established in 2018 by the city government to acknowledge the efforts of Ilagueño farmers for their contributory role as the backbone of the city's local economy and agriculture sector being the largest corn producer in the Philippines.

Bonifacio Park is also a triangular shaped park which features a dancing fountain and the giant Butaka, once vied the largest wooden lounge chair in the world.

Ilagan's Rizal Park is a scaled-down version of the Rizal Park. Aside from a replica of the Rizal Monument, it also features a dancing fountain and three old church bells from Saint Ferdinand Parish Church, among others.

Saint Ferdinand Parish Proto-Cathedral is one of the oldest churches in Isabela, located beside Saint Ferdinand College and Rizal Park. It was built by Fr. Miguel Matos, O.P. from 1696 to 1700 as a mamposteria and brick church. The 1866 typhoon destroyed the church dome. Fr. Pablo Almazan, OP, demolished the church's solid walls while the solid belfry was constructed by Fr. Pedro San Pedro, OP, in 1777, terminated by Fr. Joaquin Sancho, OP, in 1783. Fr. Luis constructed the sacristy in 1829 adjacent to the cemetery of San Vicente, built by Fr. Isidro Martinena, OP in 1892. Founded on January 31, 1979, the Roman Catholic Diocese of Ilagan is a suffragan diocese of the Roman Catholic Archdiocese of Tuguegarao, with patron St. Ferdinand III of Castile, whose feast day is celebrated on May 30. In 2003, the seat of the Roman Catholic Diocese of Ilagan was transferred to a new Cathedral Church (and Bishops’ Residence) in Upi, Gamu, Isabela. At present, the centuries-old structure is designated as a proto-cathedral by the Roman Catholic Diocese of Ilagan. On 29 October 2023, a mass was held for the celebration of the first Holy Rosary Festival wherein the pilgrim image of the St. Ferdinand Parish - Our Lady of the Most Holy Rosary was episcopally crowned by Most Rev. David William V. Antonio, D.D., STHD., bishop of the Diocese of Ilagan. On April 22, 2024, a fire started from the roof of the 300-year-old church which destroyed most of its interior. “The fire ravaged everything,” Fr. Ric-Zeus Angobung, the parish priest said. The final investigation report of the Bureau of Fire Protection (BFP) identified the total cost of the damages is estimated to be around P35-40 million which include antique religious items among others. The Department of Public Works and Highways (DPWH) and Ilagan City Engineering Office conducted a series of tests and studies which revealed that only around 20-30% of the structural integrity of the church remained after the fire took down most of its interior. Just days after the devastating fire that destroyed the proto-cathedral, the City Government of Ilagan in coordination with the Roman Catholic Diocese of Ilagan, were able to put up a temporary altar and steel benches covered with aluminum roofing sheets and steel trusses in the church-front courtyard. The place is often referred by locals as the Family Park. All regular masses of the parish are being held temporarily in the makeshift altar since April 28, 2024, while the clearing and restoration of the church is still ongoing.

Balai na Ilagan, also known as Friendship Hall, is a multi-purpose hall and former convent within the grounds of the diocese of the Roman Catholic Church, set up by Stewards and Friends of Ilagan to give Ilagueños a communal space to nurture the artistic talents of Ilagan's residents. It celebrates art and culture in the province of Isabela.

== Culture ==
Ilagan today, being recognized as the corn capital of the country lives its economic boom while playing a vital contributory role for the province of Isabela as its capital since its creation as a province. To the predominantly agricultural economy of the province of Isabela, the city adds vigor to its trade, commercial, and cultural life.

=== Aggaw na Ilagan ===
Aggaw na Ilagan (transl. Ilagan Day) is celebrated annually every May 4. It was the date when Ilagan was founded as a town.

=== Binallay festival ===
It was during the administration of then Mayor Delfinito C. Albano that Binallay Festival became the official festivity of Ilagan but was later replaced by the Mammangi Festival.

=== Cityhood anniversary ===
Celebrated every August 11. The city government celebrated the first anniversary of Ilagan's cityhood charter in 2013. On August 11, 2015, marked another day in the history of Ilagan as the Department of Agriculture proclaimed the city as the new Corn Capital of the Philippines during its third cityhood anniversary.

=== Cuisine ===
The city is famous for its food culture. The much-loved food as part of the city's culture is called binallay. It's one of the famous rice cakes made from glutinous rice flour combined with water, mixed into a smooth batter, wrapped in a banana leaf, then steamed until cooked all the way through. Binallay is a native rice cake prepared year-round in Ilagan. It is being sold together with other delicacies and handmade products/items at the City of Ilagan Pasalubong Center located at the Bonifacio Park.

=== Mammangi festival ===
Celebrated during the last week of May; Mammangi is an Ibanag term that signifies the Ilagueño corn farmers, recognized by many as the backbone of the city's economy which encompasses the entire agricultural cycle, from land preparation - plowing, tilling, planting to nurturing, harvesting, drying, and delivering produce from farm to market. The city boasts corn as its primary crop, earning it the distinction of being declared the Corn Capital of the Philippines by the Department of Agriculture (DA) in 2015. The Mammangi Festival is a occasion, a thanksgiving for the abundant harvests and the city's achievements and progress over the years. It pays homage to the farmers who are the real foundation of Ilagan's economy and the rich agricultural heritage of the city, which focuses on corn production as one of the significant farming activities among the first ethnic inhabitants of Ilagan. The festival activities include the Agri-Eco Tourism Tienda Ilagan Booths, Cultural Olympics, Search for Binibining Ilagan, Barangay Night, Off-Road Challenge, Motor Show, Street Dance and Showdown Competition, Grand Musical Concert, Gawad Ilagueño, and Grand Concert. In 2011, General Ordinance No. 33 promulgated during the administration of then Mayor Josemarie L. Diaz ordained Mammangui Festival as the official festivity of Ilagan to be celebrated on the month of May.

=== Patronal and town fiesta ===
As is common with many places in predominantly Catholic Philippines, Ilagan celebrates the feast day of its patron, Saint Ferdinand of Castile, every May 30 including the celebration of the town fiesta.

=== Pop culture ===
Film director Romm Burlat is set to produce Pira-Pirasong Pangarap, an upcoming film biography that will portray the interesting and inspiring story of the current mayor Josemarie L. Diaz as a political leader. Gabby Concepcion, a popular drama actor will portray as the mayor in the upcoming movie.

== Sports ==
The city has been the venue and the host of international, national, regional, and local sports competitions. The venue for these events are usually held at the City of Ilagan Sports Complex.

On January 11, 2019, the Philippine Sports Commission (PSC) announced that Ilagan will be hosting the 2019 Batang Pinoy Luzon qualifying leg sports competition; it was held on March 16–23, 2019. Batang Pinoy is a national competition for athletes under fifteen years old and was established through Executive Order No. 44, which was signed by then President Joseph Estrada on December 2, 1998.

In May 2022, Ilagan hosted the Philta National Youth Tennis Circuit 2022 and the Little League North Luzon baseball championship national sports events. The delegates for baseball are from the city of Ilagan, the municipality of Divilacan in Isabela, the provinces of Kalinga, Mountain Province, Ilocos Norte, and Zambales. While for tennis, the delegates are from the city of Manila, provinces of Palawan, Nueva Ecija, and Quirino, the cities of Santiago and Cauayan municipalities of Roxas and Alicia in Isabela. It was held on May 23–29, 2022 at the City of Ilagan Sports Complex.

In February 2023, Ilagan hosted the Baseball Little League Philippine Games. An estimated number of 2,000 delegates composed of athletes, coaches and chairpersons from North and South Luzon including National Capital Region participated in the sports event held on February 5–12, 2023 at the City of Ilagan Sports Complex. The 2023 Little League Philippines National Finals was also held in Ilagan on April 9–16, 2023. The final leg of the 2023 Philippine Baseball Series was joined by 63 teams from regional tournaments in Luzon, Visayas and Mindanao.

In March 2023, the Philippine Athletics Track and Field Association (PATAFA), Inc. management has chosen the City of Ilagan as the venue of the International Container Terminal Services Incorporated (ICTSI) - sponsored Philippine Athletic Championships where delegations from Malaysia, Vietnam, Thailand, Indonesia, Brunei, and Iraq converged in the city to compete for 165 medals in 80 athletic sports events. The 5-day sports competition was held at the City of Ilagan Sports Complex on March 22–26, 2023. The 2023 Cagayan Valley Regional Association of State Universities and Colleges (CaVRASUC) games and Socio-Cultural Festival was also held in Ilagan on March 27–30, 2023. The annual sports event was participated by an estimate of 1,500 student athletes, coaches and officials from the different delegations of state universities and colleges in the Cagayan Valley region which included Isabela State University, Quirino State University, Nueva Vizcaya State University, Batanes State College and Philippine Normal University - North Luzon campus.

The 2023 Cagayan Valley Regional Athletic Association (CAVRAA) meet was held in Ilagan on April 23–28, 2023. An estimate of almost 7,000 delegates and technical officials from the provinces of Isabela, Quirino, Nueva Vizcaya, Cagayan, Batanes and the cities of Ilagan, Santiago, Tuguegarao, and Cauayan participated in the annual sports event that was hosted by the DepEd Schools Division of the City of Ilagan and the city government.

Ilagan hosted the 2024 Cagayan Valley Regional Athletic Association (CAVRAA) meet for the fifth time since becoming a city in 2012 and having its own separate schools division in 2013. The grand opening ceremony was held at the City of Ilagan Sports Complex on April 26, 2024, which was attended by athletes, coaches, technical officials and executives from the nine delegations who participated in the much anticipated sports event. All of which was made possible through the initiative and support of the City Government of Ilagan and the DepEd Schools Division of the City of Ilagan. The sports event was held from April 26–30, 2024.

On January 16, 2025, Maharlika Pilipinas Basketball League commissioner Kenneth Duremdes announced that the city will join the regional league with an expansion team for the upcoming 2025 season.

=== City of Ilagan Sports Complex ===
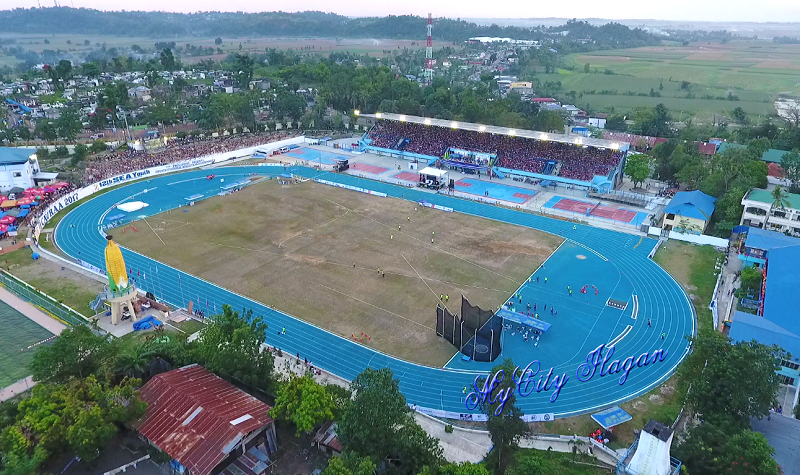
Ilagan Sports Complex

The City of Ilagan Sports Complex (formerly called Paguirigan Memorial Athletic Stadium) is a sports facility equipped with modern rubber tracks, basketball, volleyball, badminton, and tennis courts, concrete bleachers, and a new swimming pool that was built to accommodate major sports and athletic events such as the Cagayan Valley Regional Athletic Association (CAVRAA) meet held in 2016 and 2017. It was the chosen venue by the Philippine Athletics Track and Field Association (PATAFA), Inc. for the 2017, 2018 and 2019 Ayala Philippine Athletics Championships, 12th and 14th South East Asia Youth Athletics Championship and the 2017 Philippine National Open Invitational Athletics Championship, where world class athletes from Thailand, Indonesia, Malaysia, Singapore, Vietnam, Cambodia, Timor-Leste, Laos, Brunei, Sri Lanka, Hong Kong, Fil-Am contingent, Philippine Team and the host City of Ilagan team participated in the said event. It is the first city outside Metro Manila to have hosted the championships for 2 years in a row, first and only Philippine city in this decade to have an International Association of Athletics Federations (IAAF) certified track and field competition venue, first host city to stage the international format of athletics competition and the first host city to have organized the championships integrating entertainment and the thrill of sports competition.

=== City Sports and Convention Center ===
The City of Ilagan Community Center is a fully air-conditioned facility that was built to accommodate indoor events such as basketball games, badminton and volleyball tournaments, cheerdance competitions, concerts, and other important activities. The SK Federation in Ilagan has a yearly basketball tournament for the youth of the city. The facility was utilized for meeting and served as a vaccination site during COVID-19 pandemic. On June 12, 2023, the City Government led the ribbon-cutting of the newly renovated former City of Ilagan Community Center, which is now renamed as the City Sports and Convention Center during the commemoration of the country's 125th Independence Day and the 78th liberation of the City of Ilagan.

=== Isabela Sports Complex ===
In 1993, Ilagan hosted the Palarong Pambansa (National Games) and in 2011 the SCUAA National Olympics. It was held at the Isabela Sports Complex. The sports complex was erected by the National Government and local officials during the presidency of Fidel V. Ramos as a permanent facility for the province of Isabela. The impressive facility of 50 hectares, on which has built a stadium with a 39,000 seating capacity, likewise has an athlete's village for housing participants. Some of the houses for the athlete's village were donated by certain civic-minded citizens and organizations who were approached by the officials of the province through the initiative of the late former Isabela Governor Benjamin G. Dy. The complex is also equipped with a basketball court, volleyball courts, swimming pool, badminton courts, tennis courts, a sepak takraw court, an oval rubber track, and a baseball field.

=== Isabela Golf Club ===
The only golf course in Isabela is located in Ilagan. Built in early 60s, the golf course has nine holes, its fairways are well-trimmed and most of the sand greens are heavily guarded by bunkers which are well-maintained, throughout the year. The facilities include a clubhouse, pro shop, tee houses, restaurant, lockers and showers for male and female, a function room, a secure storage and more. This golf course has produced several World Junior Golf Champions.

=== Ping-pong central ===
Table tennis is also a popular sport in the city. It is played regularly and hosted by the Table Tennis Association of Ilagan (TATAC-Ilagan). Regular ranking tournament is held monthly among residents of Ilagan. The open tournament is held annually.

== Government ==
As a component city and the capital of the province of Isabela, government officials at the provincial level are voted by the electorates of the city. The provincial government has political jurisdiction over the local transactions of the city government.

The city of Ilagan is governed by a city mayor designated as its local chief executive and by a city council as its legislative body per the Local Government Code. The mayor, vice mayor, and councilors are elected directly by the people through an election that is held every three years.

Barangays are also headed by elected officials: Barangay Captain, Barangay Council, whose members are called Barangay Councilors. The barangays have an SK federation which represents the barangay, headed by the SK chairperson and whose members are called SK councilors. All officials are also elected every three years.

=== City symbols ===
City Seal of Ilagan

The city seal has an inscription of the city name "City of Ilagan" and the name of the province "Isabela" with the year 1686 as the foundation of the town and 2012 as the year of its cityhood declaration on a dark blue ring.

Within the ring, located at the upper-left portion, is a mountain representing the Sierra Madre mountain ranges, the longest mountain ranges in the Philippines. Nearby are two rivers representing the Cagayan River and Ilagan River, showing that the Ilagan River flows westward from the Sierra Madre, joining the Cagayan River. The people near the center, colored yellow, represent the city's citizens, with the overlapping buildings and red gear representing city urbanization, and the municipal logo placed inside the gear as an homage to the city's past.

Near the upper-right are various agricultural symbols: a carabao horn (representing the prevalence of carabaos in the local farming industry), a kamote or sweet potato (a major local root crop), maize (a major local crop representing the city's title as the Corn Capital of the Philippines), and a stalk of palay or unharvested rice (another major crop in the city, representing the city as a part of Asia given its nature as a staple food in the continent).

Another inscription is written at the bottom of the seal's inner portion: the Latin phrase Vox populi, Vox Dei, meaning "the Voice of the People, the Voice of God."

The city's barangays also have their own seals which represent themselves.

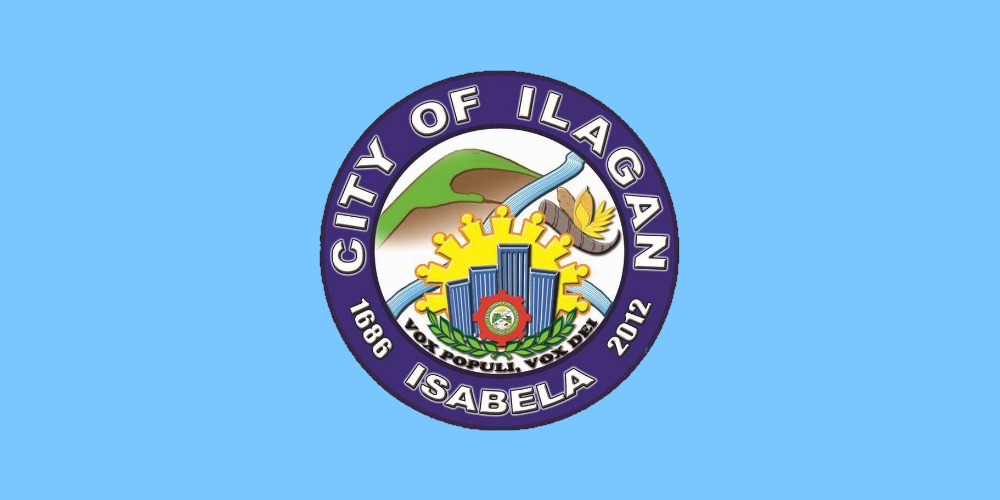
City Flag of Ilagan

The city flag, like many LGU flags in the Philippines, is a "seal on a bedsheet" (a derogatory term in Vexillology that refers to flags that use a solid color background with the seal of what the flag represents placed on top). More specifically, the flag has a background of light blue or azure (the de facto city color of Ilagan) with the city seal on top.

The city flag has no official aspect ratio, although it is commonly reproduced with either a 1:2 ratio (like that of the Philippine national flag) or a 2:3 (like most other flags).

The current city anthem or hymn is the City of Ilagan Hymn, composed by Ato Del Rosario and lyrics by Nilo Agustin. According to the city's Facebook page, the new hymn was inspired by the incumbent city mayor, Hon. Josemarie L. Diaz. Although well-received, it does not yet seem to have widespread adoption for flag ceremonies in public schools like the former anthem did.

The former city anthem was the Martsa ng Ilagan (transl. Ilagan March), composed by Rev. Fr. Ingeno Rapadas.

The city, being called the Corn Capital of the Philippines is often symbolized by corn, making it Ilagan's de facto city crop.

As mentioned previously, light blue or azure is a de facto city color. Golden yellow or maize yellow is also a de facto city color, with both colors often being used by the city government across the city (especially on the sidewalks and poles along the national highway).

=== Congressional representation ===
Ilagan is part of the first legislative district of the province of Isabela. Currently, the city is represented by Antonio T. Albano in the House of Representatives.

=== Elected officials ===
Prior to Ilagan's cityhood, there have been 28 municipal mayors since 1904. The first municipal mayor was Rafael Maramag who served the town from 1904 to 1906. Its first city mayor is Josemarie L. Diaz from 2012 to 2016.

Mayor of the City of Ilagan
- Seal of the City of Ilagan
- Incumbent; Josemarie L. Diaz since June 30, 2019 (2nd term)
- Appointer: Elected via popular vote (maximum of three consecutive terms)
- Term length: 3 years
- Formation: 1904
- Website: cityofilagan.gov.ph

Members of the Ilagan City Council (2025–2028)! Position
Name
District Representative (1st Legislative District of the province of Isabela)	Antonio T. Albano
Chief Executive of the City of Ilagan (Mayor)	Josemarie L. Diaz
Presiding Officer of the City Council of Ilagan (Vice Mayor)	Jay Eveson C. Diaz
Members of the City Council	Rachel Villanueva
Members of the City Council	Kit Bello
Members of the City Council	Harold Olalia
Members of the City Council	Joji Borromeo
Members of the City Council	Lillian Bringas
Members of the City Council	Antonio Manaligod Jr.
Members of the City Council	Rolly Tugade
Members of the City Council	Perly Gaoiran
Members of the City Council	Gaylor Malunay
Members of the City Council	Bic-Bic Albano

=== Judiciary ===
On August 29, 2025, the Philippine congress enacted Republic Act No. 12245, establishing a Regional Trial Court (RTC) and Office of the Clerk of Court (OCC) in the city of Ilagan under the Second Judicial Region. The branches are intended to address the increasing volume of cases in the province and to improve access to judicial services for residents of Ilagan and northern Isabela.

== Infrastructure ==
=== Bridges ===
One of the longest bridges is the Malalam Bridge which was inaugurated on December 8, 1995.

Baculud Overflow Bridge was inaugurated in 2014 that connects the Poblacion area to the northeastern barangays going to Tuguegarao. In 2016, the structure was damaged by flood brought by the torrential rain when Typhoon Haima or locally known as Super Typhoon Lawin struck the provinces of Isabela and Cagayan. The authorities had to close the bridge until the completion of its rehabilitation which began in 2017. On May 4, 2019, the two-lane overflow bridge was reinaugurated by the city government during the 333rd founding anniversary of Ilagan.

Lullutan Bridge was opened in February 2015 to the public local by the national and local government. On April 8, 2015, then President Benigno Aquino III traveled to Isabela to lead the inauguration of the new bridge, which connects the east and west banks of the Cagayan River. It connects the city's western barangays and nearby municipalities of Delfin Albano and Tumauini. Before the construction of the new bridge, residents have to use barges to transport agricultural products to the market. Due to this, travel time between barangays on either side of the river has been cut short drastically.

The Santa Maria (Cabisera 8) bridge was completed and opened to the public in 2015. Road concreting and widening, creation of diversion and circumferential roads and farm to market roads were prioritized by the national and city government to help mobilize the transportation goods and delivery of basic services within the city's jurisdiction and neighboring municipalities.

Cabisera 2 (Dappat) Bridge was inaugurated by the City Government of Ilagan on November 23, 2023. It is expected to provide ease and convenience in travelling to the residents of far-flung communities in San Antonio Region.

=== Civic center ===
On February 21, 2021, the City Government of Ilagan spearheaded the ground-breaking ceremony for the Phase 1 of the P250 million worth Multi-Purpose Sports, Commercial and Convention Center with a total maximum capacity of up to 10,000 seats, the biggest of its kind in Northern Luzon. The Phase 2 of said project is set to be completed by the first quarter of 2024. The Capital Arena is situated in the newly established 10-hectares civic center wherein field offices of the different national government agencies were built upon since its establishment in 2020. These agencies include the Technical Skills and Development Authority (TESDA) Isabela Provincial Field Office, Department of Trade and Industry (DTI-Isabela), Department of Science and Technology (DOST-Isabela), New Ilagan City District Jail and Bureau of Jail Management and Penology (BJMP-Isabela), Social Security System (SSS) Regional Office, Department of Education (DepEd - Division of the City of Ilagan), PNP Highway Patrol Group Regional Office, Department of Labor and Employment (DOLE-Isabela), Philippine Coast Guard Northeastern Luzon District Office and the new Ilagan City Hotel. On November 22, 2023, the Philippine Statistics Authority - Civil Registry System (PSA-CRS) Outlet was officially opened and inaugurated to cater the Central Cagayan Valley Region. The modern facility is located in the newly built PSA Building within the grounds of the City Hall Complex. The joint venture was made possible thru the initiative and support of the City Government of Ilagan and the Philippine Statistics Authority. It is expected to accommodate clients from neighboring cities, municipalities and nearby provinces who can now effortlessly request Civil Registry Documents without having to travel to the Regional Government Center in Tuguegarao City, Cagayan. On November 24, 2023, the Philippine Statistics Authority (PSA) Building was formally inaugurated by the City Government of Ilagan and PSA - Isabela Provincial Statistical Office. The three-story structure that house the PSA-CRS Outlet is located within the City Hall Complex.

=== Electricity ===
Residences and establishments get their energy needs through the service provided by the Isabela Electric Cooperative II, Inc. (ISELCO II). Based on MPDO record, 63 out of 91 barangays are energized. As of 2011, Ilagan is now 100% energized. Also, a sub-station of National Grid Corporation of the Philippines (NGCP).

The Department of Energy (DOE) approved on May 27, 2015, the service contract of the largest solar PV power plant in the Philippines. Cheap solar energy will be available for residents here soon after the proponents of the P7-billion solar power plant have already secured its funding. A twenty-five (25) year Service contract was signed between Living Project 4 People Philippines Inc. (LP4PP) and the Department of Energy. The signing will start the process of completion of the development, installation, construction, commissioning, and operation of a 100.0 MW Solar PV Project in the city. LP4PP said that the solar project will be constructed in 10 phases to install 10.0 MW for each phase that will start construction in August 2015. Accordingly, it is a pure solar PV Grid-connected installation that will avail of the privileges under the Renewable Energy Law of the country. The renewable energy to be generated will be sold directly to the National Grid Corporation of the Philippines (NGCP) under the Feed-in-Tariff Scheme of the RE law. The 100.0 MW Solar PV project will help alleviate the current electricity shortage in the country that causes regular blackouts resulting in industry closures as well as inconvenience to the consumers. The solar power facility will be constructed on a 100-hectare land, several kilometers away from the city proper.

In December 2022, the Department of Energy (DOE) has given the go signal to a Filipino-French joint venture to develop one of the biggest renewable energy projects in the Philippines - an ₱18-billion solar farm in Ilagan City. The project will be undertaken by San Ignacio Energy Resources Development Corporation, which is part of the Nextnorth Energy Group developing over 450 megawatts of solar and hydro projects in Northern Luzon, and French firm Total Eren S.A. The project will involve the development of a 440 MWp/336 MWac solar PV project to be built on around 400 hectares of available land located along the Northern Luzon high voltage transmission network of the National Grid Corporation of the Philippines (NGCP). The project is scheduled to start construction in 2024 and start feeding electricity into the grid in 2025. The groundbreaking ceremony of the multi-billion project took place on November 24, 2023.

On the 10th of June 2024, Marcos, Jr. led the signing ceremony of the connection contract by Anthony L. Almeda, National Grid Corporation of the Philippines President, the partnership of the San Ignacio Energy Resources Development Corporation (SIERDC) of Nextnorth Holdings Corporation and TotalEnergies as financier. Located in the 392-hectare industrial classified project site located in the city's western clusters and nearby municipality of Gamu, the PhP18 billion Isabela Ground Mounted Solar PV Project (IGMSP) with 700,000 solar panels, will generate 440 megawatts of sustainable energy for Isabela by 2028, of 700 gigawatts ((GWh) annually and will provide 4,000 jobs. The agreement obligates NGCP to build a 7.5-kilometer 230 kilovolt transmission line from IGMSP to its Gamu Substation.

=== Housing ===
On January 24, 2023, the city government signed a Memorandum of Understanding with the Department of Human Settlements and Urban Development (DHSUD) for a housing project under the national government's flagship banner Pambansang Pabahay Para sa Pilipino (4PH) which include 20 high-rise condominium-type buildings that is equivalent to almost 5,500 units. The contract signing was held on September 18, 2023, which was attended by representatives from the National Government, Department of Human Settlements and Urban Development (DSHUD), Home Development Mutual Fund (HDMF-Pag-IBIG) and the City Government of Ilagan while the ground-breaking ceremony of the said project was done on November 24, 2023. On August 7, 2023, the City Government of Ilagan inaugurated one of its flagship project which is the JLD Housing Project with a total capitalization of P100 million. The project aims to augment the housing backlogs of the city and to provide 100 housing units which are ready for occupancy to all qualified employees of the city government itself. The subdivision-type housing project is situated beside Richmond Hills Subdivision, few meters away from Xentro Mall (Northstar) and the City of Ilagan Civic Center. These joint ventures of the city government and other attached agencies were all carefully planned in accordance with the vision of making Ilagan a liveable city by the year 2030.

=== Road networks ===
Ilagan is linked by a national highway called Maharlika Highway (designated as Asian Highway 26, AH26 by Asian Highway Network). There are 29.313 km (18.214 mi) of concrete road out of 24.56 km (15.26 mi) of national road that passes through the city.

The city is one of the few places in the Cagayan Valley region that has a continuous freeway lighting system. The city government has managed to install incandescent highway lights along the national road.

Provincial Road. Other road networks are 33.005 km (20.508 mi) provincial roads, 8,909 city streets and 269.713 km (167.592 mi) of barangay roads. Ilagan is accessible by all means of land transportation. From the Poblacion to the 91 barangays and five adjacent municipalities. Regular jeepney trips are from 6:00 am to 9:00 pm. Tricycles are available 24 hours a day.

Ilagan–Delfin Albano–Mallig (IDAM) Road was declared a national road in 2001 by the Department of Public Works and Highways (DPWH), stretching from Ilagan to the municipality of Mallig. With a total length of 38.78 kilometers, it also serves as an alternate gateway and vital route for the delivery of goods and basic services within Ilagan and its neighboring towns.

Ilagan–Gamu Road is a segment of the national highway that serves as an alternate bypass route that connects the western cluster of Ilagan to the nearby municipality of Gamu. It is connected to the Gamu-Roxas Road that stretches from the municipality of Gamu to the municipalities of Burgos and Roxas, the gateway to the Mallig Plains region.

Ilagan–Divilacan Road. The construction of an 82-kilometer Ilagan–Divilacan Road through the protected Sierra Madre mountains is ongoing to open access to the coastal towns of Divilacan, Palanan, and Maconacon. The approved budget contract of the project amounting to P1.5B, will pass through the foothills of the 359,486-hectare Northern Sierra Madre mountain ranges and will take four years to complete. The project will improve an old logging road used by the defunct Acme Logging Corp.

=== Telecommunications ===
The city has several internet cafés, and the majority of the country's Internet Service providers (ISPs) are available in Ilagan, such as Globe Broadband, Converge Fiber, and PLDT Fiber. Cable TV provider Polaris Cable Vision also offers fiber Internet connection.

The Philippine Long Distance Telephone Company provides fixed line services. Wireless mobile communications services are provided by Smart Communications and Globe Telecommunications. Dito Telecommunity is now available offering connectivity service.

Other companies providing various telecommunications services such as telegraph and fax services are PT&T, and RCPI now Universal Storefront Services Corporation.

=== Transportation ===
The mode of transportation in the city includes jeepneys, tricycles, buses, and taxis. The local government efforts in addressing the transportation needs. These include the upcoming Hybrid Electric Road Train, and Podcar Public Transportation System.

Ilagan is the only place in Cagayan Valley that considers jeepneys as one of the primary means of public transportation within its vicinity and neighboring municipalities. There are 432 Jeepneys used as the major public transportation in Ilagan with corresponding routes from Centro-Calamagui-Alibagu-Upi junction-Guibang vice versa, Centro-Calamagui-Bliss Village-Salindingan vice versa, Centro-San Antonio region vice versa, Centro-Bintacan vice versa, and neighboring towns Ilagan-Gamu-Burgos-Roxas vice versa.

There are around 4,000 tricycle units that ply around the city. Like jeepneys, these tricycle units have their own route to different parts of the city.

There are few bus companies with its own terminal in the city. Each company operates a fleet of air conditioned buses with daily trips to Manila from their respective terminals. Several bus companies also use the Ilagan route from Tuguegarao City and Northern Isabela to Manila, Dagupan, Baguio and other destinations.

Bus companies like Victory Liner, and GV Florida Transport have terminals within the city that offers daily trips bound to Metro Manila (like Kamias in Quezon City, Sampaloc in Manila) including the city of Baguio.

The Local Government Unit (LGU) inaugurated the Ilagan City Integrated Central Terminal beside the Xentro Mall in barangay Alibagu on November 28, 2011. It is primarily being used as the main transport terminal for all kinds of public utility vehicles in Ilagan. On July 17, 2023, the Ilagan City Integrated Central Terminal was given the Certificate of Accreditation by the Land Transportation Franchising and Regulatory Board (LTFRB), being the first Region Accredited Central Terminal in Cagayan Valley. The LGU-owned and operated transport facility has substantially complied with the guidelines for Off-Street Terminal Operations under Department Order No. 2017-011, otherwise known as the Omnibus Franchising Guidelines, in relation to Memorandum Circular 2017-030 and Memorandum Circular 2022-051.

The city will soon adapt the Hybrid Electric Road Train (HERT) which was developed by the DOST as an alternative mode of transport for front-liners, community outreach activities, among others. Each coach of the HERT can accommodate 220 passengers.

On May 4, 2022, the city government launched eleven units of taxis as LTFRB issued 90-day provisional authority. The transport service will ply across Cagayan Valley and it is the first in the region. Additionally, the city launched 58 public utility vehicles that will service the city as part of its modernization program.

On February 23, 2023, the City Government of Ilagan in partnership with FUTRAN Philippines, Inc. conducted a public hearing at the Ilagan Community Center for the proposed FUTRAN Green Energy Podcar Public Transportation System. After months of feasibility study and coordination of all parties involved, the proposed multi-billion project was officially unveiled to the public on November 24, 2023, during its groundbreaking ceremony at the Ilagan City Integrated Central Terminal in barangay Alibagu, the first of its kind in the Northern Philippines. The first phase of the new transportation system project is designed to run 10-kilometers that will start in barangay Alibagu to barangay Centro Poblacion which is expected to be operational by March 2024. Top officials and executives from both parties attended the well-anticipated event.

=== Water and sewerage system ===
The City of Ilagan Water District (CIWD) is a government-owned and controlled corporation that is mandated to supply all the water needs of its concessionaires. It has managed to put up several pumping stations throughout the city to cater to the increasing demand of Ilagan's growing population and economy. Some residents and privately owned business entities have their own electric water pumps and some can up their own traditional deep wells for their own water needs and irrigation systems especially those residents from far-flung barangays who are not able to avail the service provided by the water district. Its main office is located in barangay Osmeña. Several water refilling stations have opened to serve as an alternative for the residents for their water needs. Also, the city government is continuously implementing solutions in line with the water and sewerage problems of the city such as the construction of deep wells in every barangay and the construction of drainages and canals in those areas affected by floods during the rainy and stormy season.

In 2018, the City of Ilagan Water District (CIWD) signed a joint venture deal with Filipinas Water Holdings Inc. (Filipinas Water) a consortium of Manila Water and its wholly owned subsidiary Manila Water Philippine Ventures for the implementation, development, maintenance and construction of bulk water supply with system expansion and septage management project in the City of Ilagan, to be known as Metro Ilagan Water. Under the agreement, all parties involved came up with a deal to form the Metro Ilagan Water, a joint venture company where the consortium shall own ninety percent and the local water district shall own ten percent of the outstanding capital stock. The partnership between the two entities hopes to resolve the current hurdles and increasing demands in the water supply system of the city and to address the main concerns of its concessionaires.

The City of Ilagan Bulk Water Supply Project is a Public-Private Partnership (PPP) project approved by the National Economic Development Authority (NEDA). It is a joint venture between Metro Ilagan Water and Filipinas Water Holdings Corporation, Manila Water Company and Manila Water Philippine Ventures, Inc. for a 25-year contract on a project that will supply an additional 36 million liters of water per day (MLD) to the water system of the city itself. The consortium invested an initial capitalization of P1.13 billion to the project. The target completion of the Phase 1 of the project is set in July 2024. On November 24, 2023, the Metro Ilagan Water Treatment Facility was officially inaugurated by the City Government of Ilagan and Metro Ilagan Water, the first of its kind in Ilagan. The multi-billion water treatment facility is designed to address the immediate concerns of its concessionaires, provide quality-adequate water supply and improve the current services in the city. The consortium pledged to invest in future projects which include the construction of Sewage Water Treatment Facilities in 2024 to attain the Sustainable Plan & Development towards the goal of becoming a liveable city by 2030.

The Pasa Small Reservoir Irrigation Project (PSRIP) is an irrigation project with an investment of $21.7 million. It is a joint undertaking between the South Korean government, through the Korea International Cooperation Agency (Koica), and the Philippines, through the National Irrigation Administration and the local government of Isabela. The project entailed the construction of a 34-meter high earth-filled dam across the Pasa River, a reservoir with an active storage of 3.90 million cubic meters, with 5.93 kilometers of a main canal and 16.20 kilometers of lateral canals. According to authorities and government officials, the project is said to be under South Korea's five-year program under the East Asia Climate Change Partnership to address climate change and to bolster Green Growth in Asia. It was built to help mitigate floods with its small water impounding or catchment basin features aside from irrigating more farmlands in the province, the project is also aimed at reducing the impact of climate change and promoting water management in rural areas. The dam is expected to irrigate eight hundred (800) hectares of farmlands, covering the barangays of Pasa, Santa Victoria, Fuyo, Morado, and Minabang, all within Ilagan City, and should benefit seven hundred forty-seven (747) families in the province of Isabela. Also, the authorities added that the Pasa Dam project would further fortify Isabela as the country's leading agriculture province, which has kept the title as a top corn producer and second in rice production.

== Healthcare ==
Established in 1939, the Isabela Provincial Hospital is managed by the provincial government. In 2000, it was renamed as Gov. Faustino N. Dy, Sr. Memorial Hospital.

In 2014, the City Government inaugurated a diagnostic center in San Antonio City Hospital.

Completed in 2014, the Department of Health – Drug Abuse Treatment and Rehabilitation Center Region II (DOH-DATRC RO2) was founded to bring hope and changes to the victims of drug dependency and to provide affordable, quality, and sustainable rehabilitative programs and services in partnership with other agencies towards the realization of its goal and for the fulfillment of its mandate. It is the first and only government-owned treatment and rehabilitation center in Cagayan Valley region, with a total land area of 1.97 hectares. Upon accreditation of 50-bed capacity on 12 March 2017 and completion of some infrastructures, the facility was allowed to accommodate clients for a residential program. On 12 April 2017 the center had its first residential admission and two months after, the facility was inaugurated with the presence of former DOH Secretary Pauline Jean Ubial.

On November 25, 2020, the city government inaugurated its own Molecular Laboratory at San Antonio City of Ilagan Hospital. It is the first LGU-owned and operated health facility of its kind in Cagayan Valley. The Department of Health (DOH) gave its license to operate and accommodate patients of COVID-19.

On August 11, 2021, the city government inaugurated the City of Ilagan Medical Center (CIMC) as one of the highlights during its 9th cityhood anniversary celebration. The facility is a level-II hospital with 100-bed capacity and is now being used as an isolation facility for COVID-19 patients. Due to its geographical location, it also caters patients coming from nearby municipalities.

On May 4, 2022, the groundbreaking of the City of Ilagan Medical Arts building was led by the city government beside the City of Ilagan Medical Center (CIMC). The main purpose of the building is to house medical clinics for consultations and stalls for Micro, Small, and Medium Enterprises (MSME).

On May 4, 2023, the city government undertook the groundbreaking of the Physical Rehabilitation and Infectious Disease building during the 337th Aggaw na Ilagan celebration. The proposed site of the health facility is located beside the City of Ilagan Medical Center.

=== Health centers ===
- City Health Office I)
- City Health Office II
- City of Ilagan Physical Medicine and Rehabilitation Center

=== Public hospitals ===
- City of Ilagan Medical Center
- Gov. Faustino N. Dy, Sr. Memorial Hospital
- San Antonio City of Ilagan Hospital

=== Private hospitals ===
- Isabela Doctors General Hospital
- Dr. Victor S. Villaroman Memorial Hospital

Overall, the city has three public and two private hospitals and three City Health Units. There are also dozens of dental clinics, maternity and pediatric clinics, derma clinics and pharmacies scattered around the city. The Citimed of Ilagan, Inc. is a privately owned Level-II hospital. As of 2024, the hospital is still under construction.

== Education ==
Ilagan is a center of education in the province of Isabela especially for neighboring municipalities of Tumauini, Gamu, Burgos, Roxas, Quirino, Naguilian, Benito Soliven, San Mariano and Delfin Albano. Provincial field offices of the different government agencies like the Technical Education and Skills Development Authority (TESDA) and Department of Education (DepEd) are all located in the city. The DepEd office located at the Government Center which governs school districts in the entire province of Isabela.

=== Basic education ===
The Schools Division of the City of Ilagan governs the city's public education system. The division office is a field office of the DepEd in Cagayan Valley region. The office governs the public and private elementary and public and private high schools throughout the city.

There are six integrated high schools, ten secondary public schools, and three other private secondary schools. There are 88 elementary schools throughout Ilagan, while the most populated are located in the Poblacion area.

Ilagan has formerly three districts namely: Ilagan East District, Ilagan West District, and Ilagan South District when it was under the Division of Isabela, the mother school division. These districts have clusters of schools geographically located.

On January 21, 2013, the Schools Division of the City of Ilagan was created following the success of its cityhood bid in 2012. Denizon Domingo was installed as the first city school division superintendent.

On June 17, 2013, the new school division reorganized the three existing school districts: Ilagan East District, Ilagan West District, and Ilagan South District to establish additional three school districts: Ilagan North District, Ilagan Northwest District, and San Antonio District. There are now six school districts in the city.

- Ilagan East District
- Ilagan North District
- Ilagan Northwest District
- Ilagan West District
- Ilagan South District
- San Antonio District

On July 8, 2019, the Local School Board was reorganized through executive order of the City Mayor. Currently, the schools division is headed by Dr. Eduardo C. Escorpiso, Jr. since April 3, 2023.

=== Technical & vocational schools ===
There are several post-secondary schools in the city which is being governed by Technical Education and Skills Development Authority (TESDA). These institutions offer short, one or two-year courses.

- Chronicles Institute of Isabela
- City of Ilagan International Polytechnic School
- Colegio de Ilagan
- Far East Computer Technology - Ilagan
- Isabela Provincial Training Center
- Isabela School of Arts and Trades (ISAT)
- Isabela State University also offers two year courses
- Saint Ferdinand College also offers TESDA courses
- TESDA Regional Technical Vocational Education and Training Innovation Center

=== Higher educational institutions ===
Ilagan also has two higher educational instructions which are accredited by CHED. These institutions offer undergraduate and graduate programs to the public. The local government also supports scholarship grants to deserving students for college degree programs.

- Saint Ferdinand College was established in 1950, and it is the only Catholic educational institution.
- Isabela State University - Ilagan campus was considered as one of the three state universities (along with Cabangan and Echague campuses) to form the Isabela State University on June 10, 1978, through Presidential Decree 1434.
- City of Ilagan Colleges - In 2023, the City Government of Ilagan had already completed all the necessary and pertinent documents as mandated by the Commission on Higher Education Regional Office 2 (CHED RO2) for the creation of the City of Ilagan College (CIC). The city government allotted P100 million for the construction of the said higher educational institution that is expected to offer health allied courses which include Nursing, Medical Laboratory Science, Pharmacy, Dentistry, Optometry and more. On May 4, 2023, the city government spearheaded the groundbreaking ceremony to officially mark the start of its construction which is set to be completed by 2024.

=== Training facility ===
On June 13, 2021, a memorandum of agreement was signed between the Philippine National Police and the City Government of Ilagan for the establishment of a PNP Training Facility situated in a 3-hectares property that was purchased by the city government from Tabacalera. The newly inaugurated facility is expected to serve as PNP's Recruitment and Training Center that will cater to police trainees all over Luzon including the National Capital Region.

=== Public libraries ===
The Old Capitol Building, which is now houses the Isabela Museum and Library, is a museum and a library under the provincial government. It displays artifacts that preserve and give insight into Isabela's natural and cultural history such as fossils, ethnographic items, heirloom pieces, photographs, paintings, sculptures, other visual arts, dioramas, and miniature models of provincial landmarks, among others. In August 2025, the provincial government launched the new Isabela E-Library through provincial youth and tourism offices providing free access to educational and research materials. It houses wide collection of e-books and digital resources from the national library.

The City of Ilagan Library was inaugurated on September 9, 2020, under the management of city tourism office of Ilagan serves as a learning center for students and residents. It offers books on local history, agriculture, and culture, along with basic digital resources for research. The library has reading areas for children and hosts small activities that support literacy in the community. It remains an important space for study and public information.

== Gallery ==
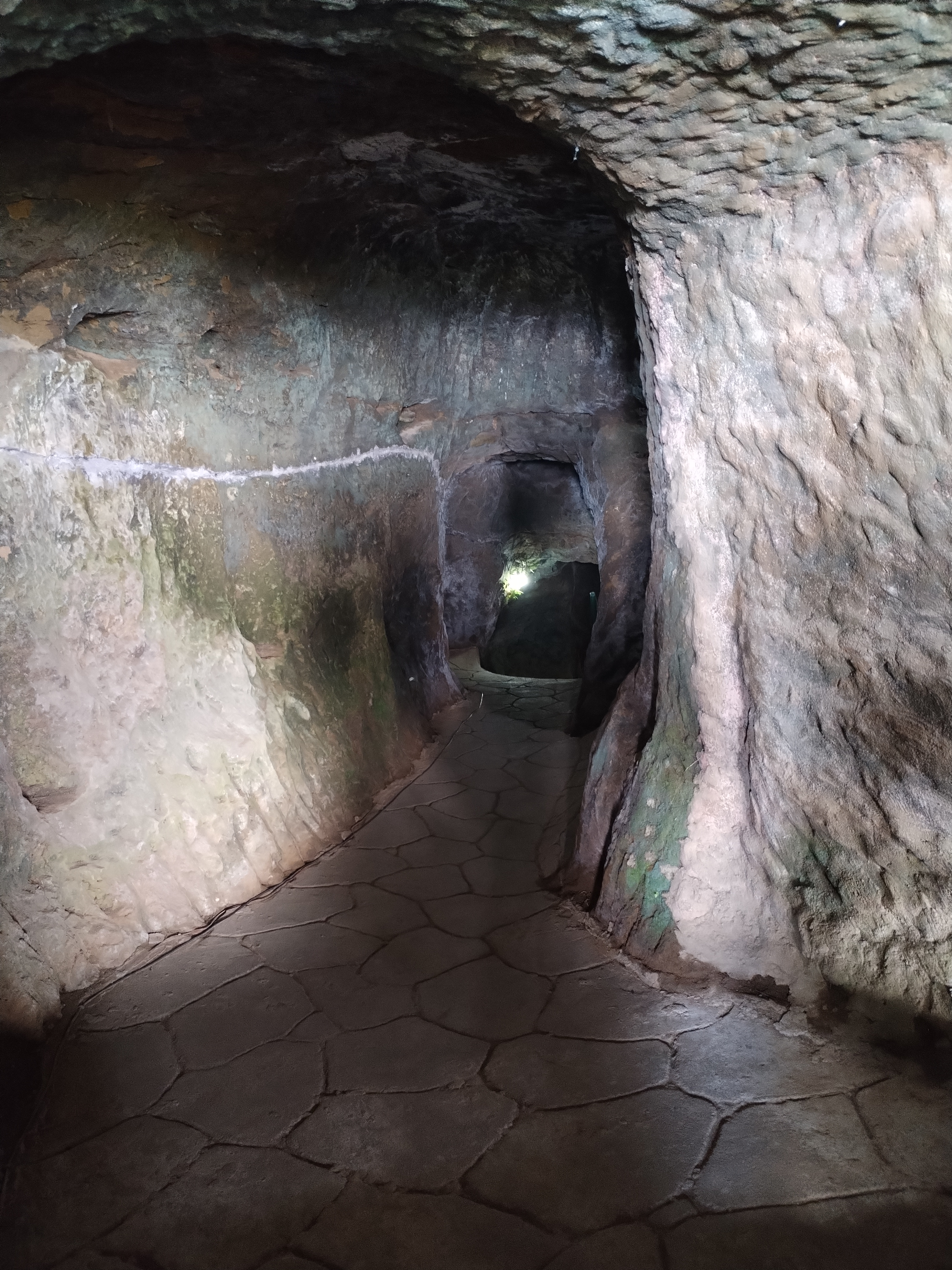
Ilagan Japanese Tunnel

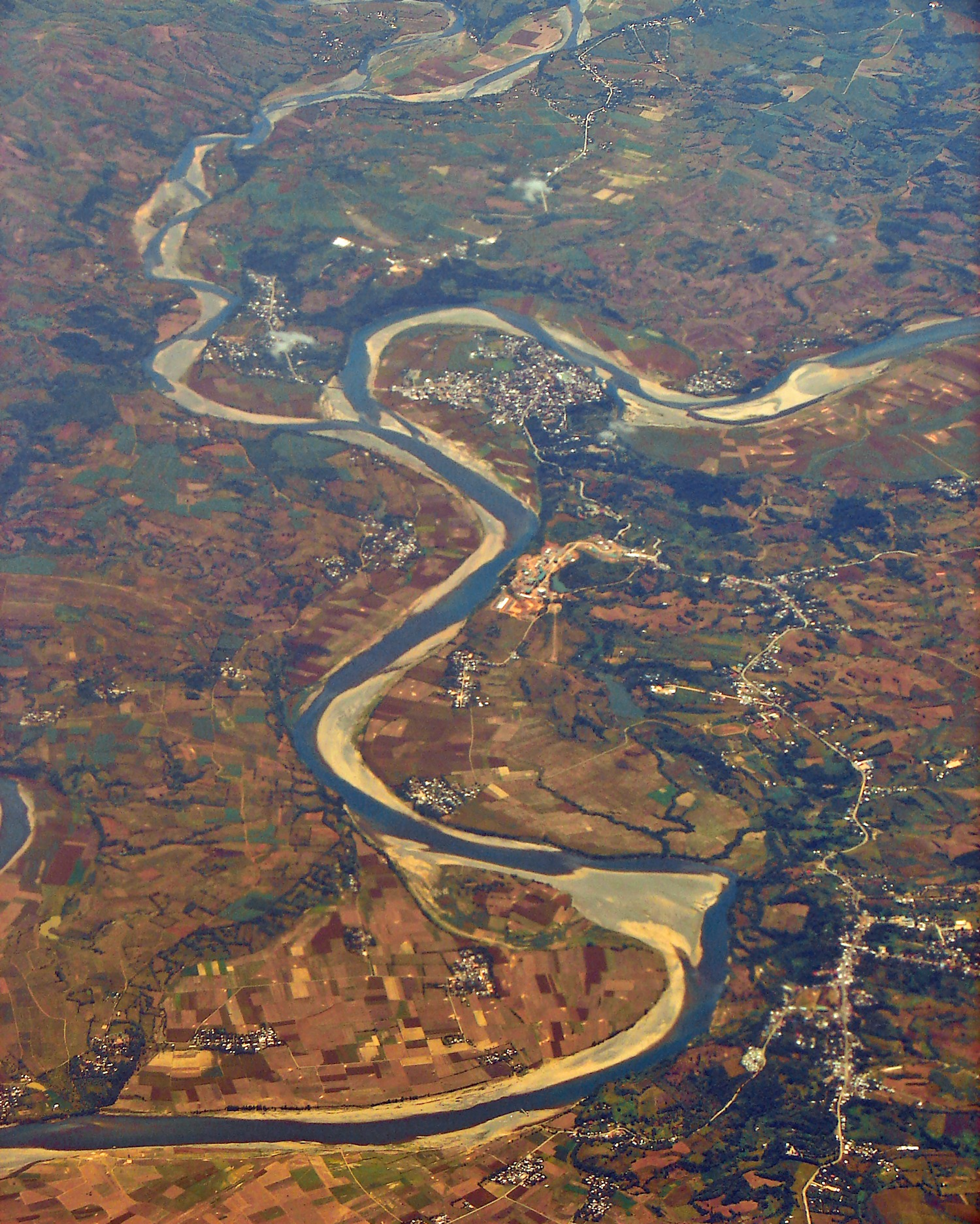
Ilagan River

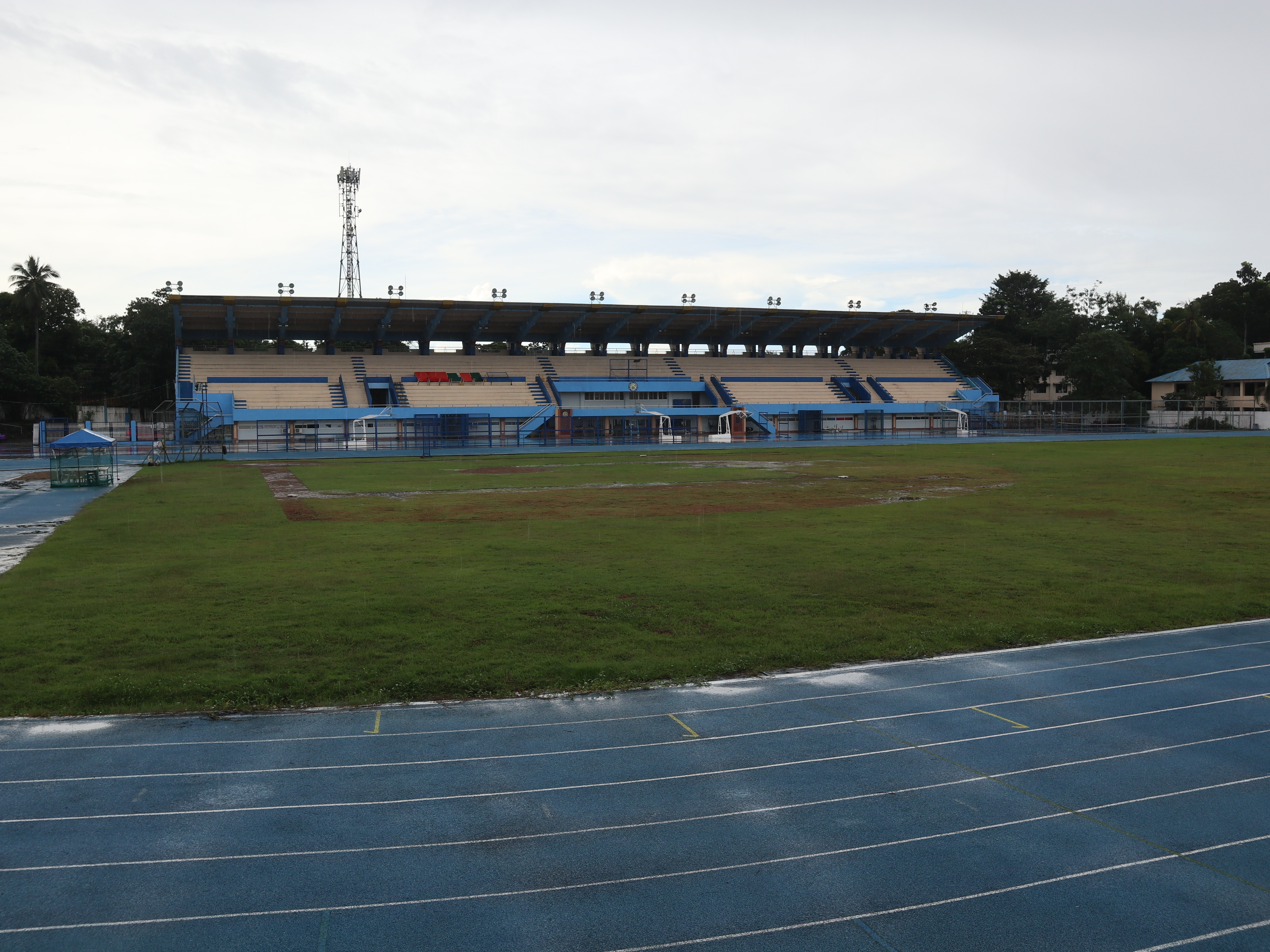
Ilagan Sports Complex

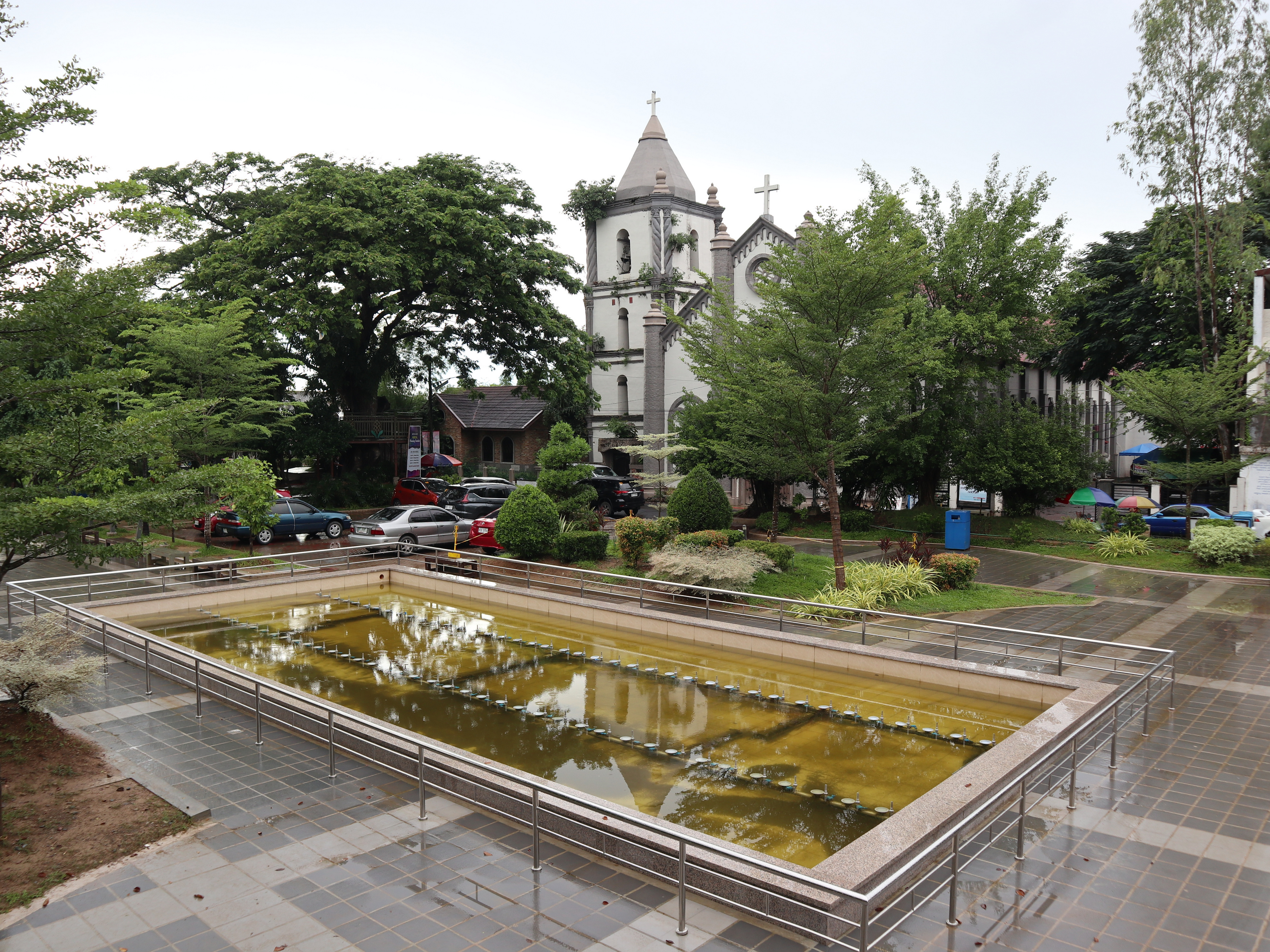
Rizal Park

The Capital Arena

== Media ==
Ilagan's main media outlet is the radio. The following may not be in operation as of 2022.

=== Radio ===
==== AM ====
- 711 kHz DZYI Sonshine Radio
- 900 kHz DZSE Radyo Alerto Asean

==== FM ====
- 101.7 MHz Pacific Broadcasting Service
- 107.9 MHz Taps Radio Ilagan

=== Television ===
The following Television stations are present:

- Channel 4 - People's Television Network
- Channel 7 - GMA Network, Inc.
- Channel 41 - Interactive Broadcast Media, Inc.

=== Print ===
- New Valley Times Press

== Notable personalities ==
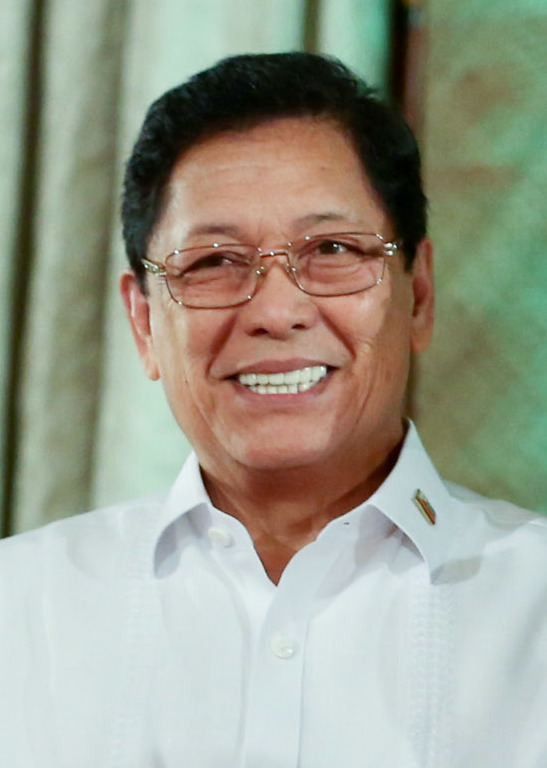
Silvestre Bello III

=== Politics ===
- Silvestre Bello III (b. 1944) – Filipino businessman and lawyer, former secretary of the Department of Labor and Employment.

=== Religion ===
- Miguel Purugganan (1931–2011) – Filipino bishop of the Roman Catholic

=== Sports ===
- Ricci Rivero (b. 1998) – Filipino basketball player of the UAAP, actor, and TV host
- Hezy Val B. Acuña II (b. 1986)– Filipino professional basketball player
- Jackson Corpuz (b. 1989) – Filipino professional basketball player

== Persona non grata ==
- CPP, NPA, and NDF since September 25, 2019

== Sister cities ==
- (Philippines) Gamu, Isabela, since March 4, 2024

== See also ==
- Ilagan Japanese War Tunnel
- Ilagan River
- Ilagan Sanctuary
- Ilagan Sports Complex
- List of barangays in Ilagan
- List of schools in Ilagan
