= Ilagan Sports Complex =

Sports complex in Isabela, Philippines

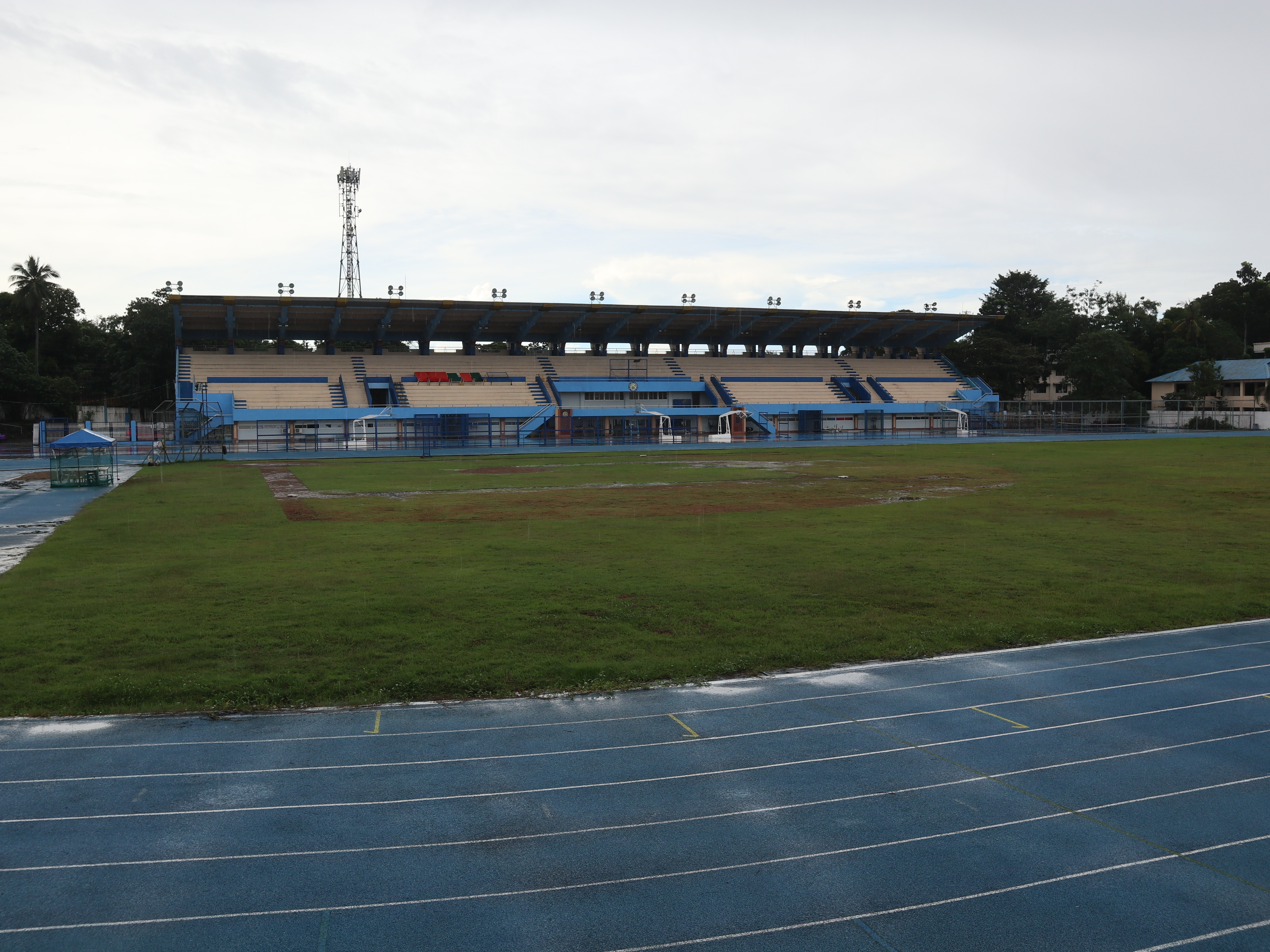
- Interactive map of Ilagan Sports Complex
- Full name: City of Ilagan Sports Complex
- Location: Ilagan City, Isabela, Philippines
- Coordinates: 17°8′35.5″N 121°53′14.1″E
- Owner: City Government of Ilagan

Construction
- Groundbreaking: October 2014
- Opened: November 2015

The City of Ilagan Sports Complex is a sports facility complex situated in Ilagan City, Isabela, Philippines. It was formerly called as Paguirigan Memorial Athletic Stadium before the construction of the new modern sports facility.

The groundbreaking of the facility was held in October 2014. It was constructed in preparation for the 2016 Cagayan Valley Regional Athletic Association (CAVRAA) sports tournament. It was formally inaugurated on November 23, 2015. The construction of the sports facility was made possible through the initiative of the city government of Ilagan and was financed by Landbank.

The 2016 and 2017 Cagayan Valley Regional Athletic Association (CAVRAA) meet was successfully staged at the sports venue held from February 24 to 29, 2016 and February 22 to 28, 2017, respectively. The sports facility was the chosen venue by the Philippine Athletics Track and Field Association (PATAFA), Inc. for the 2017, 2018 and 2019 Ayala Philippine Athletics Championships, 12th and 14th South East Asia Youth Athletics Championship and the 2017 Philippine National Open Invitational Athletics Championship. It is the first and only Philippine sports complex in this decade to have an International Association of Athletics Federations (IAAF) certified track and field competition venue.
