= 2025 Isabela local elections =

Philippine provincial elections

- May 12, 2025
- Gubernatorial election
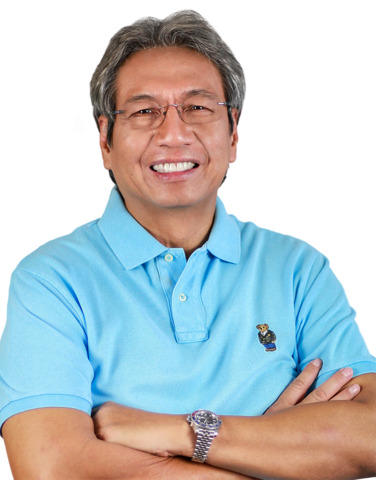
Candidate	Rodolfo Albano III
Party	PFP
Running mate	Kiko Dy
Popular vote	651,999
Percentage	100.00
Governor before election
Rodolfo Albano III
PFP
Elected Governor
Rodolfo Albano III
PFP
- Vice gubernatorial election
	Lakas
Candidate	Kiko Dy
Party	Lakas
Popular vote	566,489
Percentage	100.00
Vice Governor before election
Bojie Dy
PFP
Elected Vice Governor
Kiko Dy
Lakas
- Provincial Board election
- 12 out of 19 seats in the Isabela Provincial Board; 10 seats needed for a majority
Party	Vote %	Seats	+/–
PFP	52.64	6	+1
NPC	16.37	2	0
Lakas	12.89	2	−1
Aksyon	8.66	1	+1
LDP	6.43	1	0
This lists parties that won seats. See the complete results below.

Local elections were held in Isabela on May 12, 2025, as part of the 2025 Philippine general election. Isabela voters elected a governor, a vice governor, and 12 out of 19 members of the Isabela Provincial Board.

== Governor ==
Incumbent Rodolfo Albano III (Partido Federal ng Pilipinas) is running for a third term. Albano was re-elected under PDP–Laban with 95.17% of the vote in 2022.

=== Candidates ===
The following candidates are included in the ballot:

No.	Candidate	Party
1	Rodolfo Albano III (incumbent)	Partido Federal ng Pilipinas

=== Results ===
Candidate	Party	Votes	%
Rodolfo Albano III (incumbent)	Partido Federal ng Pilipinas	651,999	100.00
Total		651,999	100.00

== Vice governor ==
Incumbent Faustino Dy III (Partido Federal ng Pilipinas) is running for the House of Representatives in Isabela's 6th legislative district. Dy was re-elected under PDP–Laban unopposed in 2022.

=== Candidates ===
The following candidates are included in the ballot:

No.	Candidate	Party
1	Kiko Dy	Lakas–CMD

=== Results ===
Candidate	Party	Votes	%
Kiko Dy	Lakas–CMD	566,489	100.00
Total		566,489	100.00

== Provincial Board ==
The Isabela Provincial Board is composed of 19 board members, 12 of whom are elected.

=== Retiring board members ===
The following board members are retiring:

- MM Albano (Lakas–CMD, 1st provincial district)
- Grace Arreola (Nationalist People's Coalition, 3rd provincial district)
- Edgar Capuchino (Nacionalista Party, 2nd provincial district), running for mayor of Naguilian
- Victor Dy (Lakas–CMD, 4th provincial district), running for mayor of Cordon

=== Overview ===
Party	Votes	%	Seats
Partido Federal ng Pilipinas	520,530	52.64	6
Nationalist People's Coalition	161,813	16.37	2
Lakas–CMD	127,437	12.89	2
Aksyon Demokratiko	85,635	8.66	1
Laban ng Demokratikong Pilipino	63,554	6.43	1
Independent	29,791	3.01	–
Total	988,760	100.00	12

=== 1st provincial district ===
Isabela's 1st provincial district consists of the same area as Isabela's 1st legislative district. Two board members are elected from this provincial district.

==== Candidates ====
The following candidates are included in the ballot:

No.	Candidate	Party
1	Emmanuel Joselito Anes (incumbent)	Partido Federal ng Pilipinas
2	Celso Balayan	Independent
3	Ejay Diaz	Partido Federal ng Pilipinas

==== Results ====
Candidate	Party	Votes	%
Ejay Diaz	Partido Federal ng Pilipinas	135,906	55.91
Emmanuel Joselito Anes (incumbent)	Partido Federal ng Pilipinas	92,095	37.89
Celso Balayan	Independent	15,075	6.20
Total		243,076	100.00

=== 2nd provincial district ===
Isabela's 2nd provincial district consists of the same area as Isabela's 2nd legislative district. Two board members are elected from this provincial district.

==== Candidates ====
The following candidates are included in the ballot:

No.	Candidate	Party
1	Ed Christian Go (incumbent)	Lakas–CMD
2	Julie Reyes	Lakas–CMD

==== Results ====
Candidate	Party	Votes	%
Ed Christian Go (incumbent)	Lakas–CMD	84,755	66.51
Julie Reyes	Lakas–CMD	42,682	33.49
Total		127,437	100.00

=== 3rd provincial district ===
Isabela's 3rd provincial district consists of the same area as Isabela's 3rd legislative district. Two board members are elected from this provincial district.

==== Candidates ====
The following candidates are included in the ballot:

No.	Candidate	Party
1	Bentot Panganiban	Nationalist People's Coalition
2	Ramon Reyes (incumbent)	Nationalist People's Coalition

==== Results ====
Candidate	Party	Votes	%
Bentot Panganiban	Nationalist People's Coalition	94,730	58.54
Ramon Reyes (incumbent)	Nationalist People's Coalition	67,083	41.46
Total		161,813	100.00

=== 4th provincial district ===
Isabela's 4th provincial district consists of the same area as Isabela's 4th legislative district. Two board members are elected from this provincial district.

==== Candidates ====
The following candidates are included in the ballot:

No.	Candidate	Party
1	Clifford Raspado (incumbent)	Partido Federal ng Pilipinas
2	Abegail Sable	Partido Federal ng Pilipinas

==== Results ====
Candidate	Party	Votes	%
Clifford Raspado (incumbent)	Partido Federal ng Pilipinas	42,286	51.59
Abegail Sable	Partido Federal ng Pilipinas	39,682	48.41
Total		81,968	100.00

=== 5th provincial district ===
Isabela's 5th provincial district consists of the same area as Isabela's 5th legislative district. Two board members are elected from this provincial district.

==== Candidates ====
The following candidates are included in the ballot:

No.	Candidate	Party
1	Totep Calderon	Aksyon Demokratiko
2	King Dy (incumbent)	Laban ng Demokratikong Pilipino
3	Edward Isidro (incumbent)	Partido Federal ng Pilipinas
4	Renen Paraguison	Independent

==== Results ====
Candidate	Party	Votes	%
Totep Calderon	Aksyon Demokratiko	85,635	41.62
King Dy (incumbent)	Laban ng Demokratikong Pilipino	63,554	30.89
Edward Isidro (incumbent)	Partido Federal ng Pilipinas	41,829	20.33
Renen Paraguison	Independent	14,716	7.15
Total		205,734	100.00

=== 6th provincial district ===
Isabela's 6th provincial district consists of the same area as Isabela's 6th legislative district. Two board members are elected from this provincial district.

==== Candidates ====
The following candidates are included in the ballot:

No.	Candidate	Party
1	Amador Gaffud Jr. (incumbent)	Partido Federal ng Pilipinas
2	Arco Meris (incumbent)	Partido Federal ng Pilipinas

==== Results ====
Candidate	Party	Votes	%
Arco Meris (incumbent)	Partido Federal ng Pilipinas	88,225	52.29
Amador Gaffud Jr. (incumbent)	Partido Federal ng Pilipinas	80,507	47.71
Total		168,732	100.00

== Election-related incidents ==
On February 28, 2025, COMELEC filed cybercrime charges against a vice-mayoral candidate in Reina Mercedes, after he posted a video on social media appearing to demonstrate a method on how to tamper with the election results. On April 26, a candidate for councilor in San Pablo was shot and injured along with two companions in an ambush.
