= Rodolfo Albano Jr. =

Filipino lawyer and politician (1934–2019)

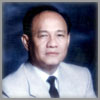
- Albano during the 12th Congress

House Majority Leader
- In office July 24, 1995 – June 30, 1998
- Speaker: Jose de Venecia Jr.
- Preceded by: Ronaldo Zamora
- Succeeded by: Mar Roxas

House Minority Leader
- In office July 27, 1987 – October 20, 1989
- Preceded by: Jose Laurel Jr. (as Minority Leader of the Regular Batasang Pambansa)
- Succeeded by: Mohammad Ali Dimaporo

House Senior Deputy Majority Leader
- In office July 27, 1992 – June 30, 1995
- Leader: Ronaldo Zamora

Member of the Philippine House of Representatives
- In office June 30, 2019 – November 5, 2019
- Preceded by: Arnel Ty
- Succeeded by: Allan Ty
- Constituency: LPGMA Partylist
- In office June 30, 2010 – June 30, 2013
- Preceded by: Rodolfo Albano III
- Succeeded by: Rodolfo Albano III
- In office June 30, 2001 – January 21, 2004
- Preceded by: Rodolfo Albano III
- Succeeded by: Rodolfo Albano III
- In office June 30, 1987 – June 30, 1998
- Preceded by: District established
- Succeeded by: Rodolfo Albano III
- Constituency: Isabela's 1st district
- In office December 30, 1969 – January 17, 1973
- Preceded by: Melanio Singson
- Succeeded by: District abolished
- Constituency: Isabela's at-large district

Member of the Batasang Pambansa
- In office June 30, 1984 – March 25, 1986 Serving with Prospero Bello and Simplicio Domingo
- Constituency: Isabela
- In office June 12, 1978 – June 30, 1984 Serving with many others
- Constituency: Region II

Chairman of the Energy Regulatory Commission
- In office January 21, 2004 – July 9, 2008
- Preceded by: Manuel Sanchez
- Succeeded by: Zenaida Cruz-Ducut

1st Vice Governor of Isabela
- In office January 1, 1960 – December 31, 1963
- Governor: Melanio Singson
- Preceded by: Office established
- Succeeded by: Leocadio Ignacio

Mayor of Cabagan, Isabela
- In office June 30, 2013 – June 30, 2016
- Vice Mayor: Christopher Mamauag
- Preceded by: Christopher Mamauag
- Succeeded by: Christopher Mamauag

Personal details
- Born: Rodolfo Bagunu Albano Jr. March 27, 1934 Cabagan, Isabela, Philippine Islands
- Died: November 5, 2019 (aged 85) Manila, Philippines
- Party: NPC (1991–1994; 2009–2019); LPGMA (party-list; 2018–2019)
- Other political affiliations: Lakas (1994–2009); KBL (1978–1991); Nacionalista (1959–1973)
- Spouse: Josefina Sia Taguinod
- Children: 6 (including Rodolfo III and Tonypet)

Rodolfo Bagunu Albano Jr. (March 27, 1934 – November 5, 2019) was a Filipino lawyer and politician. He served as House majority leader from 1995 to 1998 and as House minority leader from 1987 to 1989. Referred to as "Lakay Rudy" by his constituents, he represented Isabela's first district in the House of Representatives in the 8th to 10th, 12th, and 15th Congresses, and the province's lone district during the 7th Congress. He represented the LPGMA Partylist from June 2019 until his death in office in November of the same year. He was also a member of the Batasang Pambansa from 1978 to 1986.

Albano served as chairperson of the Energy Regulatory Commission from 2004 to 2008 under the presidency of Gloria Macapagal Arroyo.

== Early life and education ==
Albano was born on March 27, 1934 in Cabagan, Isabela to former representative Rodolfo Delfin Albano and Alfreda Bagunu, the scion of a landowning family. His paternal grandfather, Francisco Albano, was a carabao trader who immigrated to Cabagan from Bacarra, Ilocos Norte.

He obtained his Bachelor of Laws degree at the Manuel L. Quezon University, and was admitted to the Philippine Bar in 1957.

== Career ==
=== Early career ===
Albano started out as his father's secretary. He was elected vice governor of Isabela in November 1959, after the Local Autonomy Act of 1959 provided for the creation of the offices of governor and vice governor. He served from January 1, 1960 until December 31, 1963 under governor Melanio Singson.

=== House of Representatives (1969–1973) ===
Albano ran for Isabela's lone district, his father's former congressional seat, in 1969 and was elected to serve in the 7th Congress, holding office until the imposition of martial law.

=== Presiding Judge of 16th Circuit Criminal Court (1975–1978) ===
In 1975, Albano was appointed by President Ferdinand Marcos as presiding judge of the 16th Circuit Criminal Court in Davao City.

=== Batasang Pambansa (1978–1986) ===
In 1978, Albano ran under the Kilusang Bagong Lipunan (KBL) ticket for one of the three contested seats for Region II in the Interim Batasang Pambansa. He placed second and served until 1984, when he was elected to the Regular Batasang Pambansa as an at-large representative for Isabela. He served until 1986, when the parliament was abolished following the People Power Revolution.

=== House of Representatives (1987–1998; 2001–2004) ===
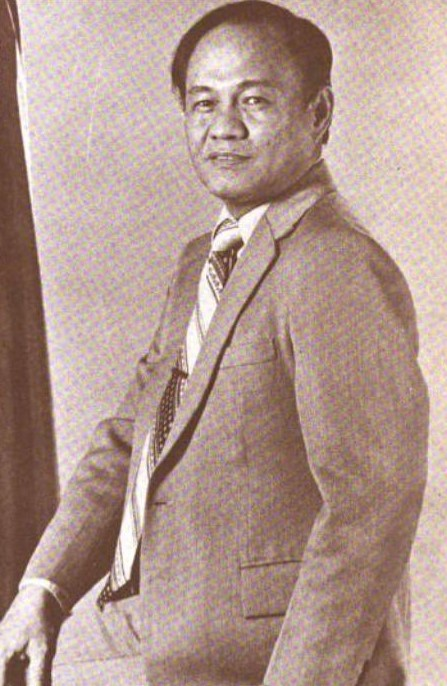
Portrait of Albano in the 8th Congress

Albano ran for the newly-created first district of Isabela in the 1987 House elections and won as a member of the KBL. He was designated minority floor leader after losing the speakership to Ramon Mitra Jr. On October 20, 1989, he resigned as minority leader to give way to Mohammad Ali Dimaporo, following an agreement within the minority bloc to rotate the position. He later joined the majority bloc under speaker Jose de Venecia Jr. in 1995 and was elected majority leader and chairperson of the House Committee on Rules. Albano served a total of three terms until 1998. During this time, Albano supported efforts in Congress to allow for the return of the remains of deposed President Ferdinand Marcos.

After a one-term hiatus, he successfully ran for the House again in 2001 under Lakas–CMD.

=== Chair of the Energy Regulatory Commission (2004–2008) ===
Albano resigned his House seat on January 21, 2004, after being appointed by President Gloria Macapagal Arroyo as chairperson of the Energy Regulatory Commission. He served until the expiration of his term on July 9, 2008.

=== House of Representatives (2010–2013) ===
Albano ran for a fifth term in Isabela's first district and was elected as its representative in the 15th Congress.

=== Mayor of Cabagan (2013–2016) ===
He ran for mayor of his hometown of Cabagan in 2013 and won.

=== House of Representatives (2019) ===
Albano was the first nominee of the LPGMA Partylist in the 2019 House elections. The party-list placed 47th in the election and won one seat. He died in office on November 5, 2019, following a heart attack. He was later honored by the House of Representatives as one of its longest-serving members.

== Personal life and death ==
Albano was married to Josefina Sia Taguinod, a former school teacher, with whom he had six children: Rodolfo III, Maria Sol, Emmanuel, Mila, Antonio, and Lourdes Martina. Josefina died in 1998.

Albano died from heart failure on November 5, 2019.

== Electoral history ==
Electoral history of Rodolfo Albano Jr.
Year	Office	Party	Votes received				Result
Year	Office	Party	Total	%	P.	Swing	Result
1960	Vice Governor of Isabela	Nacionalista	—N/a	—N/a	1st	—N/a	Won
1969	Representative (Isabela)	Nacionalista	—N/a	—N/a	1st	—N/a	Won
1978	Assemblyman (Region II)	KBL	776,519	12.32%	2nd	—N/a	Won
1984	Assemblyman (Isabela)	KBL	307,052	—N/a	1st	—N/a	Won
1987	Representative (Isabela–1st)	KBL	—N/a	—N/a	1st	—N/a	Won
1992	Representative (Isabela–1st)	NPC	62,462	92.40%	1st	—N/a	Won
1995	Representative (Isabela–1st)	Lakas	54,692	74.76%	1st	-17.64	Won
2001	Representative (Isabela–1st)	Lakas	—N/a	—N/a	1st	—N/a	Won
2010	Representative (Isabela–1st)	Lakas	103,938	74.92%	1st	—N/a	Won
2013	Mayor of Cabagan	NPC	17,177	—N/a	1st	—N/a	Won
2019	Representative (Party-list)	LPGMA	208,219	0.75%	47th	—N/a	Won

House of Representatives of the Philippines
Preceded by Ronaldo Zamora	House Majority Leader; July 24, 1995 – June 30, 1998	Succeeded by Mar Roxas
Preceded by Jose Laurel Jr. (as Minority Leader of the Batasang Pambansa)	House Minority Leader; July 27, 1987 – October 20, 1989	Succeeded by Mohammad Ali Dimaporo
Preceded by Arnel Ty	Member of the Philippine House of Representatives for LPGMA Partylist; June 30, 2019 – November 5, 2019	Succeeded by Allan Ty
Preceded by Rodolfo Albano III	Member of the Philippine House of Representatives for Isabela's 1st district June 30, 2010 – June 30, 2013 (June 30, 2001 – January 21, 2004) (June 30, 1987 – June 30, 1998)	
Preceded by Rodolfo Albano III	Member of the Philippine House of Representatives for Isabela's 1st district June 30, 2010 – June 30, 2013 (June 30, 2001 – January 21, 2004) (June 30, 1987 – June 30, 1998)	Succeeded by Rodolfo Albano III
New district	Member of the Philippine House of Representatives for Isabela's 1st district June 30, 2010 – June 30, 2013 (June 30, 2001 – January 21, 2004) (June 30, 1987 – June 30, 1998)	Succeeded by Rodolfo Albano III
New district	Member of the Batasang Pambansa from Isabela; June 30, 1984 – March 25, 1986; With: Prospero Bello and Simplicio Domingo	District abolished
New district	Member of the Batasang Pambansa from Region II; June 12, 1978 – June 30, 1984; With: Many others	District abolished
Preceded by Melanio Singson	Member of the Philippine House of Representatives for Isabela's at-large district December 30, 1969 – January 17, 1973	Vacant Martial law and adoption of the 1973 Constitution Title next held by Himself, Prospero Bello and Simplicio Domingo Jr. (in the Batasang Pambansa)
Political offices
Preceded by Manuel Sanchez	Chairman of the Energy Regulatory Commission; January 21, 2004 – July 9, 2008	Succeeded by Zenaida Cruz-Ducut
New office	Vice Governor of Isabela; January 1, 1960 – December 31, 1963	Succeeded by Leocadio Ignacio
Preceded by Christopher Mamauag	Mayor of Cabagan, Isabela; June 30, 2013 – June 30, 2016	Succeeded by Christopher Mamauag
