= Governor of Isabela =

Local chief executive

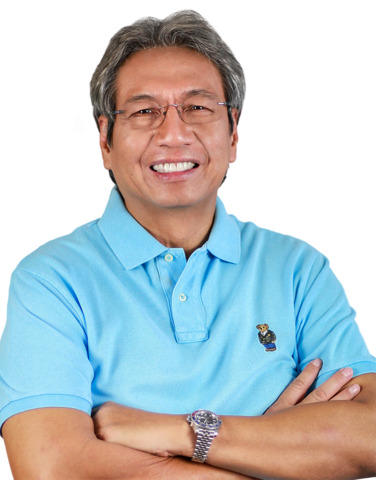
- Incumbent; Rodolfo T. Albano III since June 30, 2019
- Style: The Honorable
- Term length: 3 years
- Inaugural holder: Don Gonzalez Montero (Spanish Governor of Isabela)
- Formation: 1868

The governor of Isabela (Filipino: Punong Lalawigan ng Isabela) is the chief executive of the provincial government of Isabela.

== List of governors of Isabela ==
There have been 28 governors of Isabela since the establishment of the civil government in 1901 after the Philippine-American War.

Governors of the Province of Isabela
Governor	Term in office	Party	Election	Vice Governor	Era
Gonzalez Montero	c. 1868	Appointed by Governor-General José de la Gándara y Navarro		Office did not exist	Captaincy General of the Philippines
Jose Perez	c. 1898	Appointed by the Spanish Governor-General (Note: Existing records do not specifically state the dates of Perez's tenure, and it is therefore unclear which governor-general appointed him, as five served in 1898: Fernando Primo de Rivera, Basilio Augustín, Fermín Jáudenes (acting), Francisco Rizzo (acting), and Diego de los Ríos (acting).)		Office did not exist	Captaincy General of the Philippines
Daniel Tirona (1864–1939)	1898	Appointed by President Emilio Aguinaldo		Office did not exist	Revolutionary Government
Dimas Guzman (d. 1909)	1898–1901	Appointed by President Emilio Aguinaldo		Office did not exist	Revolutionary Government
Dimas Guzman (d. 1909)	1898–1901	Appointed by President Emilio Aguinaldo		Office did not exist	First Republic
William Johnston Jr. (1861–1933)	August 1901 – February 1902	Appointed by U.S. President William McKinley		Office did not exist	U.S. Insular Government
Francisco Dichoso	February 1902 – 1903	Unaffiliated	1902	Office did not exist	U.S. Insular Government
George Curry (1861–1947)	1903 – April 5, 1905	Appointed by U.S. President Theodore Roosevelt		Office did not exist	U.S. Insular Government
Blas Villamor	April 6, 1905 – 1907	Appointed by U.S. President Theodore Roosevelt		Office did not exist	U.S. Insular Government
Eliseo Claravall (1871–1924)	1907 – August 1909	Progresista	1907	Office did not exist	U.S. Insular Government
Romualdo Mina (1875–1948)	August – December 31, 1909	Appointed by U.S. President William Howard Taft		Office did not exist	U.S. Insular Government
Thomas Gollayan (c. 1883 – c. 1950)	January 1, 1910 – October 15, 1916	Unknown	1909	Office did not exist	U.S. Insular Government
Thomas Gollayan (c. 1883 – c. 1950)	January 1, 1910 – October 15, 1916	Unknown	1912	Office did not exist	U.S. Insular Government
Pascual Paguirigan (d. 1936)	October 16, 1916 – October 15, 1922	Nacionalista	1916	Office did not exist	U.S. Insular Government
Pascual Paguirigan (d. 1936)	October 16, 1916 – October 15, 1922	Nacionalista	1919	Office did not exist	U.S. Insular Government
Ventura Guzman	October 16, 1922 – October 15, 1925	Unknown	1922	Office did not exist	U.S. Insular Government
Primo Gaffud	October 16, 1925 – October 15, 1928	Unknown	1925	Office did not exist	U.S. Insular Government
Florentino Nicolas	October 16, 1928 – October 15, 1931	Unknown	1928	Office did not exist	U.S. Insular Government
Fortunato Bulan (1886–1961)	October 16, 1931 – October 15, 1937	Unknown	1931	Office did not exist	U.S. Insular Government
Fortunato Bulan (1886–1961)	October 16, 1931 – October 15, 1937	Unknown	1934	Office did not exist	U.S. Insular Government
Fortunato Bulan (1886–1961)	October 16, 1931 – October 15, 1937	Unknown	1934	Office did not exist	Commonwealth
Agustin Pintang	January 1, 1938 – October 5, 1939	Unknown	1937	Office did not exist	Commonwealth
Lino Castillejo	October 6, 1939 – December 31, 1940	Appointed by President Manuel L. Quezon		Office did not exist	Commonwealth
Gabriel Visaya (1899–1978)	January 1, 1941 – May 2, 1942	Unknown	1940	Office did not exist	Commonwealth
Agustin Bersamin (1888–1970)	May 3, 1942 – February 1944	Unknown	Appointed by the Japanese Military Administration	Office did not exist	Second Republic
Lino Castillejo	February 1944 – August 11, 1945	KALIBAPI	Appointed by the Japanese Military Administration	Office did not exist	Second Republic
Gregorio Formoso	August 12 – September 24, 1945	KALIBAPI	Appointed by the Japanese Military Administration	Office did not exist	Second Republic
Gabriel Visaya	September 25, 1945 – June 11, 1946	Appointed by President Sergio Osmeña		Office did not exist	Commonwealth
Silvino Gumpal (1901–1977	June 12, 1946 – December 31, 1951	Appointed by President Manuel Roxas		Office did not exist	Third Republic
Silvino Gumpal (1901–1977	June 12, 1946 – December 31, 1951	Nacionalista	1947	Office did not exist	Third Republic
Felix Caro	January 1, 1952 – December 31, 1959	Unknown	1951	Office did not exist	Third Republic
Felix Caro	January 1, 1952 – December 31, 1959	Unknown	1955	Office did not exist	Third Republic
Melanio Singson (1914–1992)	January 1, 1960 – September 15, 1965	Liberal	1959	Rodolfo Albano Jr.	Third Republic
Melanio Singson (1914–1992)	January 1, 1960 – September 15, 1965	Liberal	1963	Leocadio Ignacio	Third Republic
Leocadio Ignacio (1920–2013)	September 16, 1965 – December 31, 1967	Unknown	Succeeded from vice governor	Marcelo Padilla	Third Republic
Samuel Reyes (1916–1990)	January 1, 1968 – December 31, 1971	Liberal	1967	Eugenio Guillermo	Third Republic
Faustino Dy Sr. (1925–1993)	January 1, 1972 – December 31, 1975	Liberal (until 1978)	1971	Wilson Nuesa	Third Republic
Faustino Dy Sr. (1925–1993)	January 1, 1972 – December 31, 1975	Liberal (until 1978)	1971	Wilson Nuesa	Martial law
Faustino Dy Sr. (1925–1993)	January 1, 1976 – January 31, 1980	Liberal (until 1978)	Appointed by President Ferdinand Marcos	Wilson Nuesa	Martial law
Faustino Dy Sr. (1925–1993)	January 1, 1976 – January 31, 1980	KBL (from 1978)	Appointed by President Ferdinand Marcos	Wilson Nuesa	Martial law
Faustino Dy Sr. (1925–1993)	February 1, 1980 – May 1986	KBL (from 1978)	1980	Wilson Nuesa	Martial law
Faustino Dy Sr. (1925–1993)	February 1, 1980 – May 1986	KBL (from 1978)	1980	Wilson Nuesa	Fourth Republic
Faustino Dy Sr. (1925–1993)	February 1, 1980 – May 1986	KBL (from 1978)	1980	Wilson Nuesa	Provisional Government
Melanio Singson (1914–1992)	May 1986 – December 5, 1987	Liberal	Appointed by President Corazon Aquino	Leocadio Ignacio	Provisional Government
Melanio Singson (1914–1992)	May 1986 – December 5, 1987	Liberal	Appointed by President Corazon Aquino	Leocadio Ignacio	Fifth Republic
Silvestre Bello Jr. (born 1934)	December 6, 1987 – February 5, 1988	Unknown	Appointed by President Corazon Aquino	Celso Gangan	Fifth Republic
Faustino Dy Sr. (1925–1993)	February 6, 1988 – June 30, 1992	LnB (until 1991)	1988	Manuel Binag	Fifth Republic
Faustino Dy Sr. (1925–1993)	February 6, 1988 – June 30, 1992	Lakas (from 1991)	1988	Manuel Binag	Fifth Republic
Benjamin Dy (1952–2013)	June 30, 1992 – June 30, 2001	NPC	1992	Manuel Binag	Fifth Republic
Benjamin Dy (1952–2013)	June 30, 1992 – June 30, 2001	NPC	1995	Edwin Uy	Fifth Republic
Benjamin Dy (1952–2013)	June 30, 1992 – June 30, 2001	NPC	1998	Edwin Uy	Fifth Republic
Faustino Dy Jr. (born 1946)	June 30, 2001 – June 30, 2004	NPC	2001	Santiago Respicio	Fifth Republic
Grace Padaca (born 1963)	June 30, 2004 – June 30, 2010	Aksyon (until 2007)	2004	Ramon Reyes	Fifth Republic
Grace Padaca (born 1963)	June 30, 2004 – June 30, 2010	Liberal (from 2007)	2007	Ramon Reyes	Fifth Republic
Bojie Dy (born 1961)	June 30, 2010 – June 30, 2019	NPC (until 2018)	2010	Rodolfo Albano III	Fifth Republic
Bojie Dy (born 1961)	June 30, 2010 – June 30, 2019	NPC (until 2018)	2013	Tonypet Albano	Fifth Republic
Bojie Dy (born 1961)	June 30, 2010 – June 30, 2019	NPC (until 2018)	2016	Tonypet Albano	Fifth Republic
Bojie Dy (born 1961)	June 30, 2010 – June 30, 2019	PDP–Laban (from 2018)	2016	Tonypet Albano	Fifth Republic
Rodolfo Albano III (born 1959)	June 30, 2019 – Incumbent	PDP–Laban (until 2024)	2019	Bojie Dy	Fifth Republic
Rodolfo Albano III (born 1959)	June 30, 2019 – Incumbent	PDP–Laban (until 2024)	2022	Bojie Dy	Fifth Republic
Rodolfo Albano III (born 1959)	June 30, 2019 – Incumbent	PFP (from 2024)	2022	Bojie Dy	Fifth Republic
Rodolfo Albano III (born 1959)	June 30, 2019 – Incumbent	PFP (from 2024)	2025	Francis Dy	Fifth Republic

== See also ==
- List of vice governors of Isabela
