= Melanio Singson =

Filipino lawyer and politician (1914–1992)

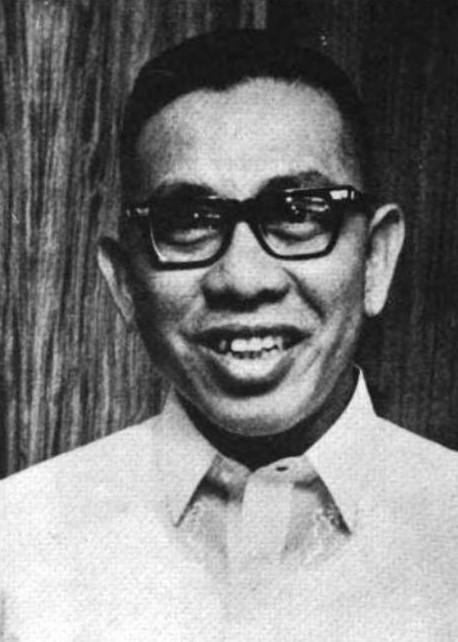
- Singson's official portrait during the 6th Congress

Secretary of Justice
- Acting
- In office August 25, 1965 – September 10, 1965
- Preceded by: Salvador Marino
- Succeeded by: Salvador Marino

Member of the Philippine House of Representatives from Isabela's at-large district
- In office December 30, 1965 – December 30, 1969
- Preceded by: Delfin Albano
- Succeeded by: Rodolfo Albano Jr.

Governor of Isabela
- Officer-in-charge
- In office May 1986 – December 5, 1987
- Vice Governor: Leocadio Ignacio
- Preceded by: Faustino Dy Sr.
- Succeeded by: Silvestre Bello Jr.
- In office January 1, 1960 – September 15, 1965
- Vice Governor: Rodolfo Albano Jr. (1960–1964); Leocadio Ignacio (1964–1965)
- Preceded by: Felix Caro
- Succeeded by: Leocadio Ignacio

Personal details
- Born: August 2, 1914 Vigan, Ilocos Sur, Philippine Islands
- Died: January 27, 1992 (aged 77)
- Party: Liberal (1959–1992); Timek (local; 1984–1992)
- Spouse: Dolores Bersamin
- Children: 9

Melanio Tangco Singson Sr. (August 2, 1914 – January 27, 1992) was a Filipino lawyer and politician who served as the representative for Isabela's at-large congressional district in the Philippine House of Representatives from 1965 to 1969. A member of the Liberal Party, he previously served as governor of Isabela from 1960 to 1965, and later as officer-in-charge of the provincial governorship from 1986 to 1987.

He was among the Liberal Party's senatorial candidates for the 1971 elections who were wounded in the Plaza Miranda bombing.

== Early life and education ==
Melanio Tangco Singson was born on August 2, 1914, in Vigan, Ilocos Sur, to Florencio Singson and Mauricia Tangco. He was the class salutatorian of the intermediate class at Colegio Seminario in Vigan in 1927 and graduated with honors from Ilocos Sur High School in 1931. He earned an Associate in Arts degree from the University of the Philippines (UP) Junior College and a Bachelor of Laws degree from the UP College of Law in 1940 as an honor student. While at UP, he won the Quezon gold medal as the first-place winner in oratory, an efficiency medal in the Reserve Officers' Training Corps (ROTC), and first place in the 1938 Philippine Collegian editorial writing test.

Singson also joined various school organizations, serving as a cadet captain in the ROTC, a member of the UP Debating and Oratorical Club and the College Editors Guild, editor-in-chief of the UP Junior College publication The Norluzonian, and technical editor of the Philippine Collegian. He was also a correspondent for the local DMHM radio station and an editor of the Ilocano biweekly newspaper Pagwadan.

Singson passed the 1940 bar examinations with a score of 87.75%.

He began his government service as a messenger at the General Auditing Office and was later promoted to audit clerk-cash examiner. In 1942, he was appointed secretary to the Isabela Provincial Board and later became assistant provincial fiscal in 1946. He entered private law practice in 1951.

== Governor of Isabela and cabinet career (1960–1965) ==
Singson was elected governor of Isabela in 1959 under the Liberal Party (LP) and was re-elected in 1963. In February 1965, President Diosdado Macapagal appointed him undersecretary of justice. He briefly served as acting secretary of justice from August to September 1965, before resigning to run for the House of Representatives.

== House of Representatives (1965–1969) ==
Singson in 1967

Singson ran for Isabela's at-large congressional district in 1965, defeating incumbent representative and Nacionalista Party candidate Delfin Albano. During the 6th Congress, he served as chairman of the House Committee on Revision of Laws, vice chairman of the committees on Good Government, Judiciary, and Reorganization, and a member of the committees on Foreign Affairs, Mines, Provincial and Municipal Governments, and Ways and Means.

Among the measures Singson authored were those creating the municipalities of Quirino, San Isidro, and San Guillermo in Isabela.

== Senatorial bid (1971) ==
In 1971, Singson was selected by the Liberal Party as one of its eight candidates for the Senate. While campaigning with senior party officials at Plaza Miranda on August 21, 1971, two grenades were reportedly thrown onto the stage as Manila LP chairman Salvador Mariño was speaking. The bombing injured Singson, the other senatorial candidates, and local politicians in attendance, and killed a 10-year-old child and The Manila Times photographer Ben Roxas.

Singson lost the election, placing tenth. He was one of only two LP candidates who failed to win a seat, alongside Salipada Pendatun.

== Later career ==
Singson ran for a seat in the Regular Batasang Pambansa in 1984, representing Isabela, but lost, placing sixth in a race for three seats.

In May 1986, following the People Power Revolution and the appointment of new local officials, President Corazon Aquino appointed Singson as officer-in-charge governor of Isabela.

== Personal life and legacy ==
Singson was married to Dolores Bersamin, with whom he had nine children. He served as a governor of the Philippine Red Cross and as a national executive member of the Boy Scouts of the Philippines, holding various leadership positions from 1955 to 1959.

Singson died on January 27, 1992.

The Governor Melanio Singson Memorial Sports Complex in Ilagan, Isabela, was renamed in his honor in 2006.

== Electoral history ==
Electoral history of Melanio Singson
Year	Office	Party	Votes received				Result
Year	Office	Party	Total	%	P.	Swing	Result
1959	Governor of Isabela	Liberal	—N/a	—N/a	1st	—N/a	Won
1963	Governor of Isabela	Liberal	—N/a	—N/a	1st	—N/a	Won
1965	Representative (Isabela)	Liberal	50,145	50.32%	1st	—N/a	Won
1971	Senator of the Philippines	Liberal	3,130,332	33.23%	10th	—N/a	Lost
1984	Assemblyman (Isabela)	Timek	—N/a	—N/a	6th	—N/a	Lost

House of Representatives of the Philippines
Preceded by Delfin Albano	Member of the Philippine House of Representatives for Isabela's at-large district 1965–1969	Succeeded by Rodolfo Albano Jr.
Political offices
Preceded by Faustino Dy Sr.	Governor of Isabela; 1986–1987	Succeeded by Silvestre Bello Jr.
Preceded by Felix Caro	Governor of Isabela; 1960–1965	Succeeded by Leocadio Ignacio
