= List of schools in Ilagan =

List of schools in Ilagan, Isabela, Philippines

Department of Education Division of the City of Ilagan
- Edukasyong Pansangay ng Lungsod Ilagan
- Official seal of the Schools Division Office of the City of Ilagan

Agency overview
- Formed: December 17, 2012
- Preceding agency: Division of Isabela
- Headquarters: INHS Compound, Claravall St., San Vicente, Ilagan City, Isabela, Philippines
- Agency executives: Dr. Eduardo C. Escorpiso, Jr., EdD, CESO V, Schools Division Superintendent; Dr. Nelia M. Mabuti, CESE, Assistant Superintendent
- Parent agency: Department of Education
- Website: sdocityofilagan.com.ph

This list of primary and secondary schools in Ilagan is sorted per district under its own separate schools division. It includes both public and private from primary to secondary that are duly recognized and accredited by the Department of Education and the Commission on Higher Education.

Schools in Ilagan City were originally grouped into three districts, namely: Ilagan East Schools District, Ilagan South Schools District and Ilagan West Schools District under the Schools Division of Isabela.

On December 17, 2012, the schools division of the city of Ilagan was established, under this arrangement, the schools are now grouped into six districts, namely: Ilagan North Schools District, Ilagan Northwest Schools District, Ilagan East Schools District, Ilagan South Schools District, Ilagan West Schools District and San Antonio Schools District.

As checked on the list of schools on Basic Education Information System (BEIS) of the DepEd, there are a total of 138 listed schools in the city.

== Schools division heads ==
The first appointed schools division head in 2013 was Dr. Denizon P. Domingo. Its current administration is headed by Dr. Eduardo C. Escorpiso, Jr., as the schools division superintendent for this division since April 3, 2023.

	Superintendent	Year
1	Denizon P. Domingo	2013–2016
2	Cherry S. Ramos	2017–2019
3	Gilbert N. Tong	2019–2023
4	Eduardo C. Escorpiso, Jr.	2023–present

== Primary and elementary schools ==
=== Public elementary schools ===
==== West Schools District ====
- Alibagu Elementary School
- Baligatan Elementary School
- Bliss Elementary School
- Camunatan Primary School
- Guinatan Primary School
- Ilagan West Central School
- Malalam Elementary School
- Namnama Elementary School
- Salindingan Elementary School
- San Felipe Elementary School
- Sto. Tomas Primary School

==== San Antonio Schools District ====
- Baribad Elementary School
- Cabeceria 3 Elementary School
- Cabeceria 6 Elementary School
- Cabeceria 19 Elementary School
- Cabeceria 23 Elementary School
- Cabeceria 24 Elementary School
- Calindayagan Elementary School
- Capugotan Elementary School
- Dappat Integrated School
- Gayong-Gayong Norte Elementary School
- Gayong-Gayong Sur Integrated School
- Nangalisan Elementary School
- Sablang Elementary School
- San Antonio Elementary School
- San Manuel Elementary School
- San Pedro Elementary School
- San Rafael Elementary School
- Sindun Maride Elementary School
- Sta. Maria Elementary School

==== North Schools District ====
- Balla Primary School
- Bangag Primary School
- Capellan Elementary School
- Capo Primary School
- Fuyo Elementary School
- Manaring Integrated School
- Minabang Elementary School
- Morado Elementary School
- Nanaguan Primary School
- Pasa Elementary School
- Rang-ayan Elementary School
- San Juan-Rugao Elementary School
- San Lorenzo Integrated School
- San Pablo-Quimalabasa Primary School
- San Rodrigo Primary School
- Sta. Catalina Elementary School
- Sta. Victoria Elementary School
- Tangcul-San Isidro Elementary School
- Tegge Elementary school

==== Northwest Schools District ====
- Arusip Elementary School
- Bagong Silang Elementary School
- Bigao Elementary School
- Cabannungan 1st Elementary School
- Cabannungan 2nd Elementary School
- Carikkikan Elementary School
- Lullutan Elementary School
- Malasin Elementary School
- Naguillian Baculud Elementary School
- Mangcuram Elementary School
- Pilar Elementary School
- San Ignacio Elementary School
- Siffu Elementary School
- Sta. Isabel Norte Elementary School
- Sta. Isabel Sur Elementary School
- Tubo Elementary School

==== East Schools District ====
- Alinguigan 1st Elementary School
- Alinguigan 2nd Integrated School
- Alinguigan 3rd Elementary School
- Bagumbayan Elementary School (formerly Ilagan North Central School)
- Ilagan East Integrated SPED Center
- Marana 1st Elementary School
- Marana 2nd Elementary School
- Marana 3rd Elementary School
- San Andres Elementary School
- Sipay Elementary School

==== South Schools District ====
- Aggassian Elementary School
- Ballacong Elementary School
- Batong Labang Elementary School
- Cabeceria 25 Elementary School
- Cebeceria 27 Elementary School
- Cadu Elementary School
- Casilagan Elementary School
- Fugu Elementary School
- Ilagan South Central School
- Lupigue Elementary School
- Sindun Bayabo Elementary School
- Sindun Highway Elementary School
- Talaytay Primary School
- Villa Imelda Primary School

=== Private elementary schools ===
- Advance Christian Academy of Ilagan
- Casa del Niño Montessori School of Ilagan - Elementary Department
- Chung Hua Institute
- Isabela Unified School
- Leap Ahead School of Learning
- Miracle Light Christian Academy - Elementary Department
- Montessori Education Center of Asia Pacific at Ilagan (MECAP)
- Saint Ferdinand College - Elementary Department
- Top Achievers Private School (TAPS) - Ilagan Campus
- The United Methodist Church - Pre-school & Elementary
- The Playhouse Preparatoria, Inc.
- The Wesleyan Church

== Secondary schools ==
=== Public high schools ===
==== West Schools District ====
- Alibagu National High School
- Ilagan Sports High School
- Isabela National High School

==== Northwest Schools District ====
- Ilagan West National High School
- Isabela School of Arts and Trades Cabannungan Annex
- Sta. Isabel National High School

==== San Antonio Schools District ====
- Dappat Integrated School
- Gayong Gayong Sur Integrated School
- San Antonio National Agro-Industrial Vocational High School
- San Pedro National High School
- San Rafael National Vocational High School

==== North Schools District ====
- Manaring Integrated School
- Rang-ayan National High School
- San Lorenzo Integrated School

==== South Schools District ====
- Isabela School of Arts and Trades
- Lupigue Integrated School

=== Private high schools ===
- Casa del Niño Montessori School of Ilagan (Junior and Senior High School)
- Central Isabela Christian Academy
- Miracle Light Christian Academy - High School Department
- Saint Ferdinand College - Junior and Senior High School Department
- Top Achievers Private School (Senior High School)

== SPED Centers ==
- Ilagan East Integrated SPED Center
- Ilagan South SPED Center
