= Cabagan–Santa Maria Bridge =

Road bridge in Isabela, Philippines

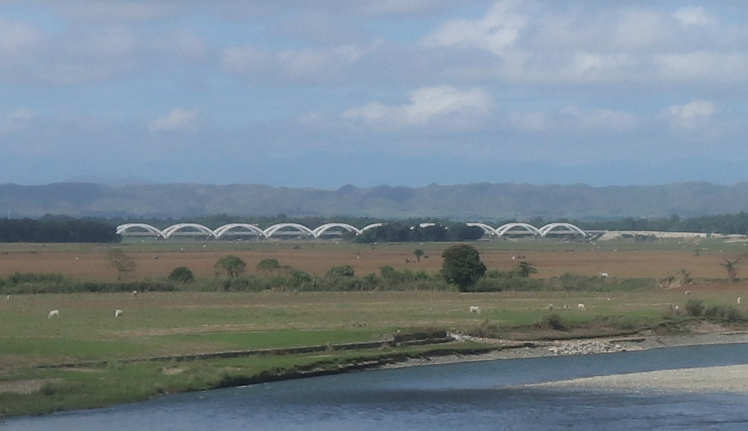
- The bridge in 2022 during its construction
- Coordinates: 17°27′02.7″N 121°44′54.2″E
- Carried: 2 lanes of N220 (Cabagan–Santa Maria Road)
- Crossed: Cagayan River
- Locale: Cabagan and Santa Maria, Isabela
- DPWH ID number: B03236LZ
- Preceded by: Cansan–Bagutari Bridge
- Followed by: Buntun Bridge

Characteristics
- Design: Tied-arch bridge
- Total length: 990 m (3,250 ft)
- No. of spans: 12 arch spans and 9 PSCG spans

History
- Construction start: November 2014
- Construction cost: ₱1.225 billion
- Inaugurated: February 1, 2025
- Collapsed: February 27, 2025; 15 months ago

Location
- Interactive map of Cabagan–Santa Maria Bridge

The Cabagan–Santa Maria Bridge is a partially collapsed bridge crossing the Cagayan River connecting the municipalities of Cabagan and Santa Maria in Isabela, Philippines.

== History ==
=== Background and proposal ===
The municipalities of Cabagan and Santa Maria in Isabela province has been linked by an overflowing concrete bridge. The old structure is usually rendered impassable during heavy rains.

The project was started during the administration of President Benigno Aquino III, but 90% of the bridge was built during the administration of President Rodrigo Duterte. Albert Cañete, an engineer specializing on bridges, proposed the design of what would become the Cabagan–Santa Maria Bridge to Department of Public Works and Highways (DPWH) Secretary Rogelio Singson in 2012.

=== Construction ===
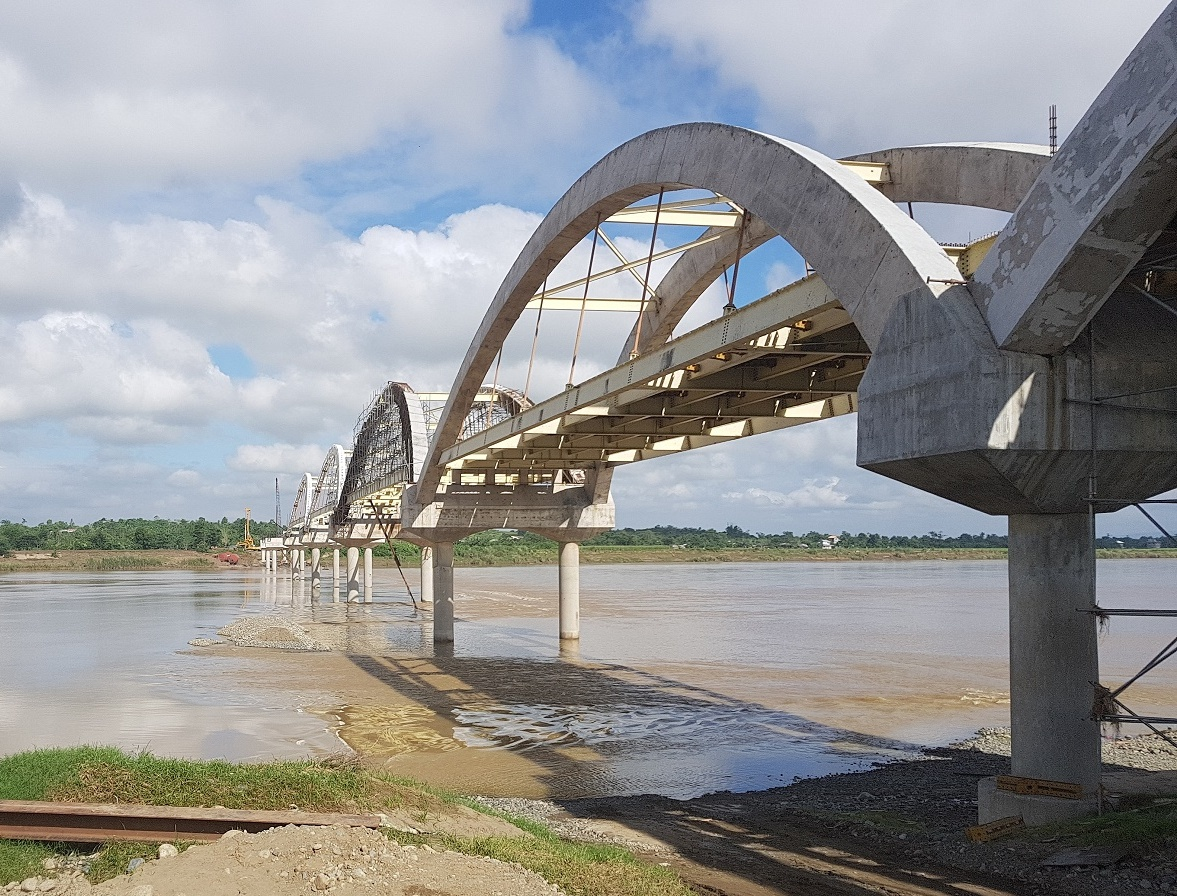
The bridge in 2018

The construction of the Cabagan–Santa Maria Bridge beside the old structure began in November 2014. The bridge's "aesthetic design" is meant to fulfill the structure's role as a landmark. It also intended to replace an older concrete bridge. Bridge engineer Cañete and United Technology Consolidated Partnership (UTCP) were behind the bridge's structural design.

The Cabagan-Santa Maria bridge was planned to be completed by 2019 but was finished in 2021. Structural defects were detected within the year. Light vehicles and bicycles are allowed to use it in times of emergencies such as flooding which submerges the old bridge.

In 2023, the DPWH awarded R.D. Interior Junior Construction the implement the final retrofitting of the bridge. The bridge was then formally completed on February 1, 2025. The bridge cost ₱1.225 billion to build.

=== Collapse ===
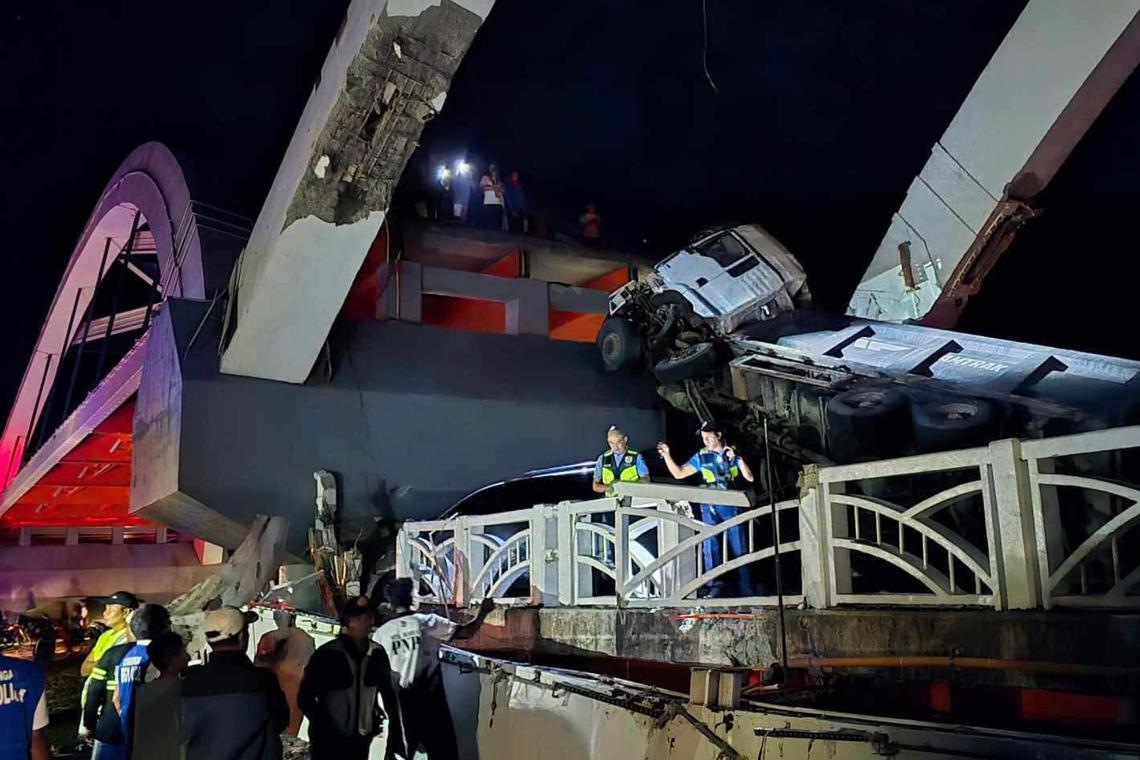
Bridge collapse on February 27, 2025.

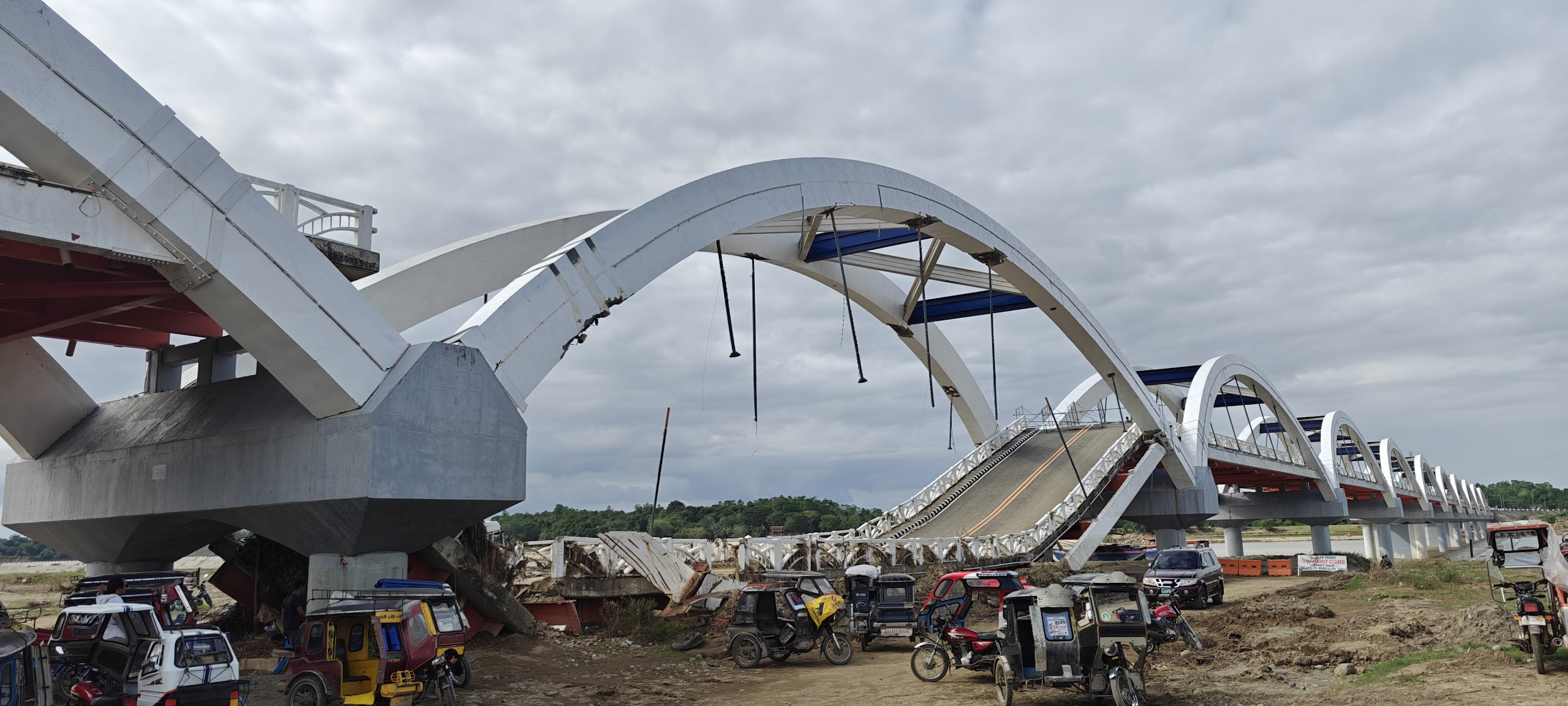
Cabagan-Santa Maria Bridge as of December 2025

On February 27, the third span from Cabagan side of the bridge collapsed after a 102-ton truck attempted to cross it. The incident injured six people. President Bongbong Marcos and DPWH officials inspected the site a week after the incident. Marcos attributed the "design flaw" as the cause of the collapse and that the budget for the bridge was reduced from ₱1.8 billion. The engineer behind the bridge, Cañete insists that the accident was due to an overloading problem, stating that the bridge is a tied-arch bridge and not a suspension bridge "without cables" as described by Marcos.

After the collapse, the UTCP and Cañete's background of being the same structural designers of the Ungka flyover in Iloilo came to light, which was closed two weeks after its opening due to complaints about structural defects that made the bridge unsafe. However, the DPWH issued a statement dissuading the public from comparing the two road structures, stating that they have different circumstances.

=== Re-opening ===
The bridge reopened to light vehicles following repairs to install a temporary connector on March 2, 2026.

== Specification ==
The newer Cabagan–Santa Maria Bridge is 990 meters (3,250 ft) long with twelve arch spans measuring 60 meters (200 ft) each; and nine pre-stressed concrete girder spans. The approaches are 664.1 linear meters (2,179 ft) long.
