= List of vice governors of Isabela =

Vice Governor of Isabela
- Incumbent; Francis Dy since June 30, 2025
- Seat: Isabela Provincial Capitol
- Nominator: Political party
- Term length: 3 years Up to three terms

The Vice Governor of Isabela (Filipino: Pangalawang Punong Lalawigan ng Isabela) is the presiding officer of the Sangguniang Panlalawigan, the legislature of the provincial government of Isabela, Philippines.

The current vice governor is Francis Dy.

== History ==
The passage of Republic Act No. 2264 (Local Autonomy Act) on June 19, 1959, created the elective office of vice-governor. Isabela's first vice governor was Rodolfo B. Albano, Jr.

== List of Vice Governors of Isabela ==
No.	Vice Governor	Term
1	Rodolfo Albano Jr.	1960-1963
2	Leocadio Ignacio	1964-1965
3	Marcelo Padilla	1965-1967
4	Eugenio Guillermo	1968-1971
5	Wilson Nuesa	1972-1986
6	Leocadio Ignacio (second term)	1986-1987
7	Celso Gangan	1987-1988
8	Manuel Binag	1988-1995
9	Edwin Uy	1995-2001
10	Santiago Respicio	2001-2004
11	Ramon Reyes	2004-2010
12	Rodolfo Albano III	2010-2013
13	Antonio Albano	2013-2019
14	Faustino Dy III	2019–2025
15	Francis Dy	2025–present

== See also ==
- Governor of Isabela
