= INHS =

INHS may refer to:

- Illinois Natural History Survey at the University of Illinois at Urbana-Champaign
- Inland Northwest Health Services in Spokane, Washington, United States
- Isabela National High School, Ilagan, Isabela, Philippines
