= Isabela School of Arts and Trades =

Public school in Isabela, Philippines

Location
- City of Ilagan, Isabela; Philippines
- Coordinates: 17°07′47″N 121°52′03″E

Information
- Type: Public Secondary and Vocational School
- Motto: Inspire, Serve, Achieve, and Transform
- Established: 1908
- Principal: Mary Ann Catindig
- Campus: Ilagan City: Calamagui 2nd (Main); Cabannungan 2nd (Annex)
- Colours: Green and Yellow
- Nickname: ISATians
- Affiliation: Department of Education
- Website: SSG TI ISAT

The Isabela School of Arts and Trades or ISAT is a public secondary and vocational school established in Ilagan, Isabela, Philippines. It is an institution that provides high school education in the province with integration of Technical Education Skills Development Authority courses.

The school was founded in 1908, making it one of the largest Technical Vocational School in the Cagayan Valley. its main campus is located in Calamagui 2nd, Ilagan City. Its annex is located at Cabannungan 2nd of the same city and is categorized as a Public High School.

As of 2019, the school is administered by Gilbert N Tong, the head of the Schools Division of the City of Ilagan. The school's current principal is Mary Ann Catindig.

== Supreme Student Government ==
Aside from the Supreme Student Government, the Isabela School of Arts and Trades has various student clubs and organizations duly recognized by the schools like the following:

- English Club
- SAMANAWI Club
- AP Club
- YES-O
- PSYSC
- Barkada Kontra Droga
- Boy Scouts of the Philippines
- Girl Scouts of the Philippines
- ISAT PEPSQUAD
- Drum and Lyre Club
