= Region II's at-large parliamentary district =

Former Philippine parliamentary district

- Former constituency for the Interim Batasang Pambansa

Former constituency
- Created: 1978
- Abolished: 1984
- Seats: 8

Region II's at-large parliamentary district (also known as Cagayan Valley's at-large parliamentary district) was a constituency for the Interim Batasang Pambansa, the legislature of the Philippines from 1978 to 1984. It encompassed the provinces of Batanes, Cagayan, Ifugao, Isabela, Kalinga-Apayao, Nueva Vizcaya, and Quirino.

The district had 8 seats in the assembly, all of which were held by members of the ruling party Kilusang Bagong Lipunan.

== List of assemblymen representing the district ==
=== Batasang Pambansa (1978–1986) ===
Portrait	Member (Lifespan) (Province)	Term of office	Party	Legislature	Electoral history	Constituencies
District established February 7, 1978.
	Rodolfo Albano Jr. (1934–2019) (Isabela)	June 12, 1978 – June 30, 1984	KBL	Interim Batasang Pambansa	Elected in 1978.	1978–1984; Provinces: Batanes, Cagayan, Ifugao, Isabela, Kalinga-Apayao, Nueva Vizcaya, Quirino
	Prospero Bello (Isabela)	June 12, 1978 – June 30, 1984	KBL	Interim Batasang Pambansa	Elected in 1978.	1978–1984; Provinces: Batanes, Cagayan, Ifugao, Isabela, Kalinga-Apayao, Nueva Vizcaya, Quirino
	Simon Gato (Batanes)	June 12, 1978 – June 30, 1984	KBL	Interim Batasang Pambansa	Elected in 1978.	1978–1984; Provinces: Batanes, Cagayan, Ifugao, Isabela, Kalinga-Apayao, Nueva Vizcaya, Quirino
	Gualberto Lumauig (1933–2018) (Ifugao)	June 12, 1978 – June 30, 1984	KBL	Interim Batasang Pambansa	Elected in 1978.	1978–1984; Provinces: Batanes, Cagayan, Ifugao, Isabela, Kalinga-Apayao, Nueva Vizcaya, Quirino
	Carlos Padilla (1944–2023) (Nueva Vizcaya)	June 12, 1978 – June 30, 1984	KBL	Interim Batasang Pambansa	Elected in 1978.	1978–1984; Provinces: Batanes, Cagayan, Ifugao, Isabela, Kalinga-Apayao, Nueva Vizcaya, Quirino
	Benjamin Perez (Quirino)	June 12, 1978 – June 30, 1984	KBL	Interim Batasang Pambansa	Elected in 1978.	1978–1984; Provinces: Batanes, Cagayan, Ifugao, Isabela, Kalinga-Apayao, Nueva Vizcaya, Quirino
	Juan Ponce Enrile (1924–2025) (Cagayan)	June 12, 1978 – June 30, 1984	KBL	Interim Batasang Pambansa	Elected in 1978.	1978–1984; Provinces: Batanes, Cagayan, Ifugao, Isabela, Kalinga-Apayao, Nueva Vizcaya, Quirino
	Rolando Puzon (Kalinga-Apayao)	June 12, 1978 – June 30, 1984	KBL	Interim Batasang Pambansa	Elected in 1978.	1978–1984; Provinces: Batanes, Cagayan, Ifugao, Isabela, Kalinga-Apayao, Nueva Vizcaya, Quirino
District dissolved into Batanes's at-large, Cagayan's at-large, Ifugao's at-large, Isabela's at-large, Kalinga-Apayao's at-large, and Nueva Vizcaya's at-large districts.

== Election results ==
=== 1978 ===
Candidate	Party	Votes	%
Juan Ponce Enrile	KBL	847,090	13.44
Rodolfo Albano Jr.	KBL	776,519	12.32
Benjamin Perez	KBL	770,412	12.22
Carlos Padilla	KBL	767,527	12.18
Prospero Bello	KBL	758,505	12.04
Rolando Puzon	KBL	758,396	12.03
Gualberto Lumauig	KBL	754,707	11.98
Simon Gato	KBL	745,362	11.83
Roy Domingo Masadao Jr.	Independent	57,998	0.92
Quirico Pilotin	Confederation of Ilocano Associations	26,329	0.42
Brigido Buenafe	Partido ng Bagong Pilipino	14,175	0.22
Sofronio Quimosing	Nacionalista	9,090	0.14
Custodio Villalva	Emancipated Scientists Party	7,901	0.13
Felipe Espiritu	Independent	4,618	0.07
Inocencio Centeno	Independent	3,441	0.05
Total		6,302,070	100.00
Total votes		887,244	–
Registered voters/turnout		969,092	91.55
