= Santa Maria, Isabela =

Municipality in Isabela, Philippines

Santa Maria
- Municipality
- Municipality of Santa Maria
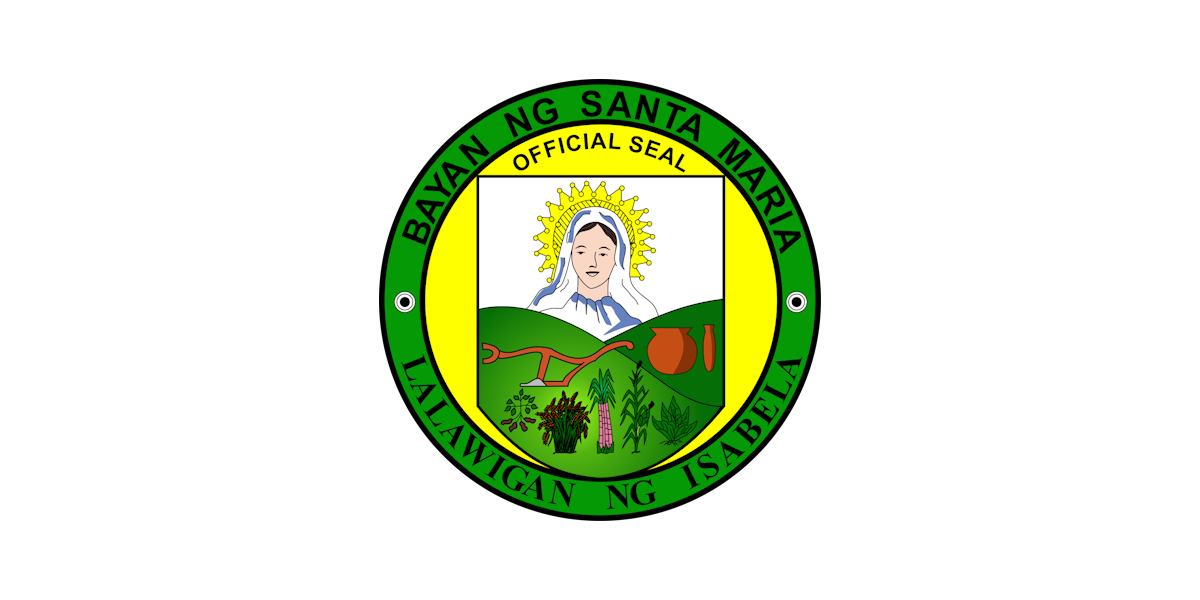
- Flag Seal
- Nickname: Finest Pottery in Cagayan Valley
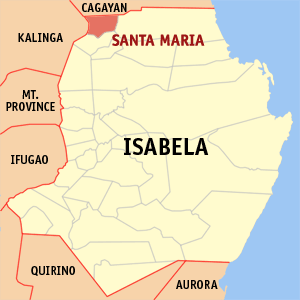
- Map of Isabela with Santa Maria highlighted
- Interactive map of Santa Maria
- Location within the Philippines
- Coordinates: 17°28′N 121°45′E
- Country: Philippines
- Region: Cagayan Valley
- Province: Isabela
- District: 1st district
- Founded: December 4, 1879
- Barangays: 20 (see Barangays)

Government
  - Type: Sangguniang Bayan
  - Mayor: Hilario G. Pagauitan
  - Vice Mayor: Michael A. Pagauitan
  - Representative: Antonio T. Albano
  - Electorate: 18,011 voters (2025)

Area
  - Total: 140.00 km^{2} (54.05 sq mi)
- Elevation: 34 m (112 ft)
- Highest elevation: 68 m (223 ft)
- Lowest elevation: 14 m (46 ft)

Population (2024 census)
  - Total: 25,919
  - Density: 185.14/km^{2} (479.50/sq mi)
  - Households: 5,485

Economy
  - Income class: 3rd municipal income class
  - Poverty incidence: 22.21% (2023)
  - Revenue: ₱ 155.9 million (2024)
  - Assets: ₱ 452.3 million (2024)
  - Expenditure: ₱ 180.7 million (2024)
  - Liabilities: ₱ 201.8 million (2024)

Service provider
  - Electricity: Isabela 2 Electric Cooperative (ISELCO 2)
- Time zone: UTC+8 (PST)
- ZIP code: 3330
- PSGC: 0203134000
- IDD : area code: +63 (0)78
- Native languages: Ibanag; Ilocano; Tagalog

Santa Maria (Ibanag: Ili nat Santa Maria; Ilocano: Ili ti Santa Maria; Tagalog: Bayan ng Santa Maria), officially the Municipality of Santa Maria, is a municipality in the province of Isabela, Philippines. According to the 2024 census, it has a population of 25,919 people.

== Etymology ==
Santa Maria, a former barrio of San Pablo, is named after Doña Maria, the firstborn child of Don Pablo Marasigan, a Spaniard, and Doña Masid, a native.

== History ==
In 1703, the hamlet of Santa Maria de Luzon was established as a pueblo and detached from Cabagan (now San Pablo town), with Don Martin Masigan serving as governor. The establishment of the town was credited to the influential Masigan family, whose roots were in the place and have served as the town's chief executives for most of its history.

On December 4, 1879, a royal order legally split the historic town of Santa Maria from Cabagan, with Dominican Fray Exequiel Pinilla serving as cura parroco. The Masigan family's influence led to the town's secession.

As it neighbors the Cordillera mountains, the town served as a starting point for Spanish military expeditions to conquer the Kalingas, who nevertheless continued to trade in the town.

== Geography ==
Santa Maria is 50.93 kilometres (31.65 mi) from the provincial capital Ilagan, 468.59 kilometres (291.17 mi) from the country's capital city of Manila.

=== Barangays ===
Santa Maria is politically subdivided into 20 barangays. Each barangay consists of puroks while some have sitios.

- Bangad
- Buenavista
- Calamagui North
- Calamagui East
- Calamagui West
- Divisoria
- Lingaling
- Mozzozzin Sur
- Mozzozzin North
- Naganacan
- Poblacion 1
- Poblacion 2
- Poblacion 3
- Quinagabian
- San Antonio
- San Isidro East
- San Isidro West
- San Rafael West
- San Rafael East
- Villabuena

=== Climate ===
Climate data for Santa Maria, Isabela
Month	Jan	Feb	Mar	Apr	May	Jun	Jul	Aug	Sep	Oct	Nov	Dec	Year
Mean daily maximum °C (°F)	29 (84)	30 (86)	32 (90)	35 (95)	35 (95)	35 (95)	34 (93)	33 (91)	32 (90)	31 (88)	30 (86)	28 (82)	32 (90)
Mean daily minimum °C (°F)	19 (66)	20 (68)	21 (70)	23 (73)	23 (73)	24 (75)	23 (73)	23 (73)	23 (73)	22 (72)	21 (70)	20 (68)	22 (71)
Average precipitation mm (inches)	31.2 (1.23)	23 (0.9)	27.7 (1.09)	28.1 (1.11)	113.5 (4.47)	141.4 (5.57)	176.4 (6.94)	236.6 (9.31)	224.9 (8.85)	247.7 (9.75)	222.9 (8.78)	178 (7.0)	1,651.4 (65)
Average rainy days	10	6	5	5	13	12	15	15	15	17	16	15	144
Source: World Weather Online

== Demographics ==
Population census of Santa Maria
Year	Pop.	±% p.a.
1903	3,252	—
1918	3,882	+1.19%
1939	5,794	+1.93%
1948	6,850	+1.88%
1960	9,705	+2.95%
1970	11,009	+1.27%
1975	12,417	+2.44%
1980	13,567	+1.79%
1990	16,767	+2.14%
1995	19,462	+2.83%
2000	20,115	+0.71%
2007	20,695	+0.39%
2010	22,939	+3.82%
2015	25,382	+1.95%
2020	25,758	+0.31%
2024	25,919	+0.15%
Source: Philippine Statistics Authority

In the 2024 census, the population of Santa Maria was 25,919 people, with a density of 190 inhabitants per square kilometre or 490 inhabitants per square mile.

== Economy ==
Poverty incidence of Santa Maria (%)

Source: Philippine Statistics Authority

== Government ==
=== Local government ===
As a municipality in the Province of Isabela, government officials at the provincial and municipal levels are voted by the town. The provincial government has political jurisdiction over most local transactions of the municipal government.

The municipality of Santa Maria is governed by a mayor, designated as its local chief executive, and by a municipal council as its legislative body in accordance with the Local Government Code. The mayor, vice mayor, and the municipal councilors are elected directly in polls held every three years.

Barangays are also headed by elected officials: Barangay Captain, Barangay Council, whose members are called Barangay Councilors. The barangays have SK federation which represents the barangay, headed by SK chairperson and whose members are called SK councilors. All officials are also elected every three years.

=== Elected officials ===
Members of the Santa Maria Municipal Council (2022-2025)
Position	Name
District Representative	Antonio T. Albano
Municipal Mayor	Hilario G. Pagauitan
Municipal Vice-Mayor	Michael A. Pagauitan
Municipal Councilors	Isaac Hilario G. Pagauitan II
Municipal Councilors	Federico D. Samus
Municipal Councilors	Champagne Irish C. Laggui
Municipal Councilors	Ricky M. Gatan
Municipal Councilors	Jay Jovito C. Martinez
Municipal Councilors	Jeriko Emmanuel Formoso
Municipal Councilors	Errol M. Datul
Municipal Councilors	Carolyn Masigan

=== Congress representation ===
Santa Maria, belonging to the first legislative district of the province of Isabela, is currently represented by Antonio T. Albano.

== Education ==
The Schools Division of Isabela governs the town's public education system. The division office is a field office of the DepEd in Cagayan Valley region. The Sta. Maria Schools District Office governs the public and private elementary and high schools throughout the municipality.

=== Primary and elementary schools ===
- Balagan Elementary School
- Bangad Elementary School
- Buenavista Elementary School
- Calamagui Elementary School
- Calamagui North Elementary School
- Dacque Primary School
- Divisoria Elementary School
- Mozzozzin Elementary School
- Naganacan Elementary School
- Poblacion 03 Primary School
- San Antonio-Lingaling Elementary School
- San Isidro East Elementary School
- San Isidro West Elementary School
- San Rafael Elementary School
- Sta. Maria Central School
- Villabuena Elementary School

=== Secondary schools ===
- Buenaventura G. Masigan National High School
- Naganacan-Villabuena National High School
- Santa Maria National High School

== Notable personalities ==
- Mutya Johanna Datul - Miss Supranational 2013
