= Cagayan's at-large congressional district =

At-large Philippine legislative district for Cagayan

- Former constituency for the Malolos Congress, National Assembly of the Philippines and Batasang Pambansa
- Province: Cagayan
- Region: Cagayan Valley (1984–1986)

Former constituency
- Created: 1898 (first creation); 1943 (second creation); 1984 (third creation)
- Abolished: 1907 (first abolition); 1945 (second abolition); 1986 (third abolition)

Cagayan's at-large congressional district may refer to three occasions when a provincewide at-large district was used for elections to the various Philippine national legislatures representing Cagayan.

From 1898 to 1901, three representatives (two appointed and one elected) sat in the Malolos Congress, the national assembly of the First Philippine Republic. Cagayan was reorganized under the Philippine Insular Government in 1901 and was divided into two districts for the Philippine Assembly in 1907. From 1943 to 1944, the province as a whole sent two representatives to the national assembly during the Second Republic. Multiple-district representation was restored in the province in 1945.

In 1978, regional at-large assembly districts were created for the Interim Batasang Pambansa, the national parliament, with Cagayan included in the 8-seat Region II at-large district. The province returned to its own single, multi-member at-large district in 1984, with a three-seat delegation to the Regular Batasang Pambansa during the Fourth Republic. After 1986, Cagayan elected its representatives from its separate congressional districts. The district was last represented by Antonio Carag, Juan Ponce Enrile, and Alfonso Reyno Jr. of Kilusang Bagong Lipunan (KBL).

== List of members representing the district ==
=== Malolos Congress (1898–1901) ===
| Seat A | | | | | Seat B | | | | | Seat C | | | | | Legislature | Constituency |
| Portrait | Member (Lifespan) | Term of office | Party | Electoral history | Portrait | Member (Lifespan) | Term of office | Party | Electoral history | Portrait | Member (Lifespan) | Term of office | Party | Electoral history | Legislature | Constituency |
|---|---|---|---|---|---|---|---|---|---|---|---|---|---|---|---|---|
District created June 18, 1898.
| | Anastacio Francisco | September 15, 1898 – March 23, 1901 | Nonpartisan | Appointed by President Emilio Aguinaldo. | | Vicente Guzman Pagulayan | September 15, 1898 – March 23, 1901 | Nonpartisan | Elected in 1898. | | Pablo Tecson (1859–1940) | September 15, 1898 – March 23, 1901 | Nonpartisan | Appointed by President Emilio Aguinaldo. | Malolos Congress | 1898–1901 [data missing] |
District dissolved into Cagayan's 1st and 2nd districts for the Philippine Assembly.

=== National Assembly (1935–1944) ===
==== Second Republic ====
| Seat A | | | | | Seat B | | | | | Legislature | Constituency |
| Portrait | Member (Lifespan) | Term of office | Party | Electoral history | Portrait | Member (Lifespan) | Term of office | Party | Electoral history | Legislature | Constituency |
|---|---|---|---|---|---|---|---|---|---|---|---|
District re-created September 7, 1943.
| | Melecio Arranz (1888–1966) | September 25, 1943 – February 2, 1944 | KALIBAPI | Elected in 1943. | | Nicanor Carag (1896–1981) | September 25, 1943 – February 2, 1944 | KALIBAPI | Appointed as an ex officio member. (Note: As Governor of Cagayan.) | National Assembly (Second Republic) | 1943–1944 [data missing] |
District dissolved into Cagayan's 1st and 2nd districts for the House of Representatives.

=== Batasang Pambansa (1978–1986) ===
| Seat A | | | | | Seat B | | | | | Seat C | | | | | Legislature | Constituency |
| Portrait | Member (Lifespan) | Term of office | Party | Electoral history | Portrait | Member (Lifespan) | Term of office | Party | Electoral history | Portrait | Member (Lifespan) | Term of office | Party | Electoral history | Legislature | Constituency |
|---|---|---|---|---|---|---|---|---|---|---|---|---|---|---|---|---|
District re-created February 1, 1984.
| | Antonio Carag | June 30, 1984 – March 25, 1986 | KBL | Elected in 1984. | | Juan Ponce Enrile (1924–2025) | June 30, 1984 – March 25, 1986 | KBL | Elected in 1984. | | Alfonso Reyno Jr. (born 1944) | June 30, 1984 – March 25, 1986 | KBL | Elected in 1984. | Regular Batasang Pambansa | 1984–1986 [data missing] |
District dissolved into Cagayan's 1st, 2nd, and 3rd districts for the House of Representatives.

== Election results ==
=== 1984 ===
1984 Philippine parliamentary election in Cagayan
| Party | Candidate | Votes | % |
|---|---|---|---|
| KBL | Juan Ponce Enrile | 307,507 | 30.22 |
| KBL | Alfonso Reyno Jr. | 277,384 | 27.26 |
| KBL | Antonio Carag | 276,474 | 27.17 |
| UNIDO | Tito Dupaya | 53,786 | 5.29 |
| UNIDO | Manuel Molina | 33,144 | 3.26 |
| UNIDO | Eulogio Balao Jr. | 28,198 | 2.77 |
| Nacionalista | Elpidio Atal | 12,985 | 1.28 |
| Nacionalista | Policropio Taguinod | 10,887 | 1.07 |
| Independent | Edgar Dupaya | 8,449 | 0.83 |
| Independent | Alberto Manginod | 5,741 | 0.56 |
| Independent | Mike Caronan | 3,004 | 0.30 |
