= Cabagan =

Municipality in Isabela, Philippines

Cabagan Cabagan Nuevo
- Municipality
- Municipality of Cabagan
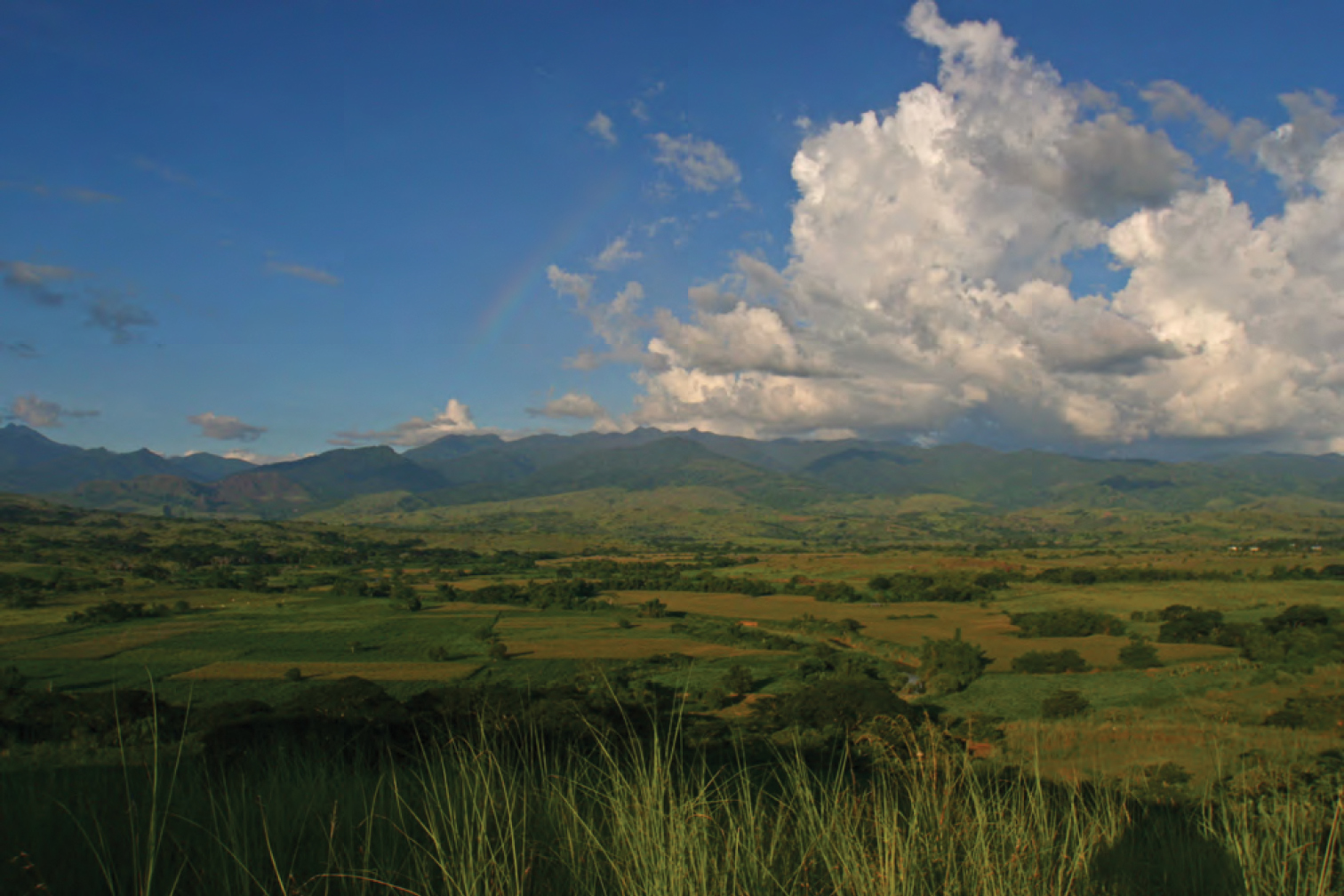
- View of the Sierra Madres from Cabagan

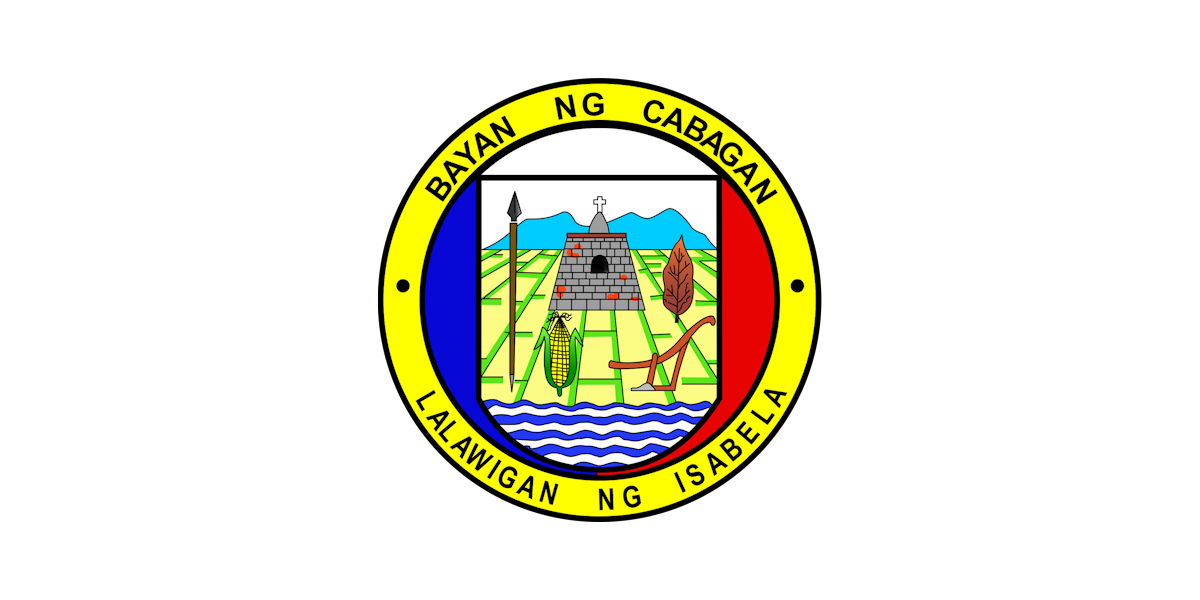
- Flag Seal
- Motto: Cabagan Ating Mahalin
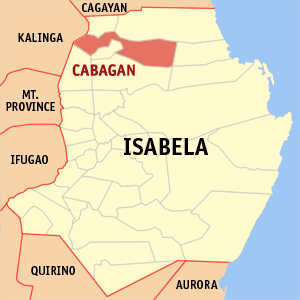
- Map of Isabela with Cabagan highlighted
- Interactive map of Cabagan
- Location within the Philippines
- Coordinates: 17°26′N 121°46′E
- Country: Philippines
- Region: Cagayan Valley
- Province: Isabela
- District: 1st district
- Barangays: 26 (see Barangays)

Government
  - Type: Sangguniang Bayan
  - Mayor: Mila Albano-Mamauag
  - Vice Mayor: Boy Fugaban
  - Representative: Antonio T. Albano
  - Electorate: 32,670 voters (2025)

Area
  - Total: 430.40 km^{2} (166.18 sq mi)
- Elevation: 31 m (102 ft)
- Highest elevation: 83 m (272 ft)
- Lowest elevation: 15 m (49 ft)

Population (2024 census)
  - Total: 55,445
  - Density: 128.82/km^{2} (333.65/sq mi)
  - Households: 11,843

Economy
  - Income class: 1st municipal income class
  - Poverty incidence: 14.97% (2023)
  - Revenue: ₱ 310.2 million (2024)
  - Assets: ₱ 1,031 million (2024)
  - Expenditure: ₱ 301.4 million (2024)
  - Liabilities: ₱ 222 million (2024)

Service provider
  - Electricity: Isabela 2 Electric Cooperative (ISELCO 2)
- Time zone: UTC+8 (PST)
- ZIP code: 3328
- PSGC: 0203106000
- IDD : area code: +63 (0)78
- Native languages: Ibanag; Ilocano; Tagalog
- Website: www.lgucabagan.gov.ph

Cabagan, officially the Municipality of Cabagan (Ibanag: Ili nat Cabagan; Ilocano: Ili ti Cabagan; Tagalog: Bayan ng Cabagan), is a municipality in the province of Isabela, Philippines. According to the 2024 census, it has a population of 55,445 people.

== Etymology ==
The name Cabagan may have originated from the native word bag or bajaque, most probably because there were stores in the village. Cabagan could have also been derived from the word cabbagang, meaning "pilgrim" or "stranger" as Cabagan at the time was in constant contact with members of the "pagan tribes" from southern Isabela, as well as with the "Kalingas" of the neighboring Cordillera mountains.

== History ==
=== Various Cabagans ===
The Cabagan of old, which existed from 1646 to 1877 was simply called, "Cabagan". In 1877, the Spaniards decided to transfer present-day Cabagan to a new site, abandoning the old Cabagan. In 1888, the Spaniards resurrected the abandoned Cabagan, into a new town. With this development, there were now two Cabagans. The Spaniards rectified the predicament by naming the first Cabagan as Cabagan Viejo, and the second Cabagan as Cabagan Nuevo or the new Cabagan.

During the American period, the names of the two Cabagans caused confusion for the colonial authorities which led them to rename Cabagan Nuevo as simply "Cabagan", and the old namesake as San Pablo.

=== Foundation ===
The old Cabagan, Cabagan Viejo which is now called "San Pablo", was the key town in the colonization of the Irrayas and southern Isabela. In 1621, the Irraya rebelled and the Spanish relocated three hundred loyalist families who agreed to establish the village of Maquilla, near Tuguegarao. Cabagan became a charter town on November 30, 1646, and ecclesiastically on May 15, 1647, with Saint Paul the Apostle as the patron saint.

=== New Cabagan (Cabagan Nuevo) ===
The new Cabagan was established after a Spanish government decree on January 25, 1877, wherein the old Cabagan or San Pablo, be transferred to its present site. The brainchild of the transfer was parish priest Pedro Ricart, who had aggressively lobbied the Spanish government. Father Jose Burgues' History of Cagayan Valley gave the unhealthiness of the old site as the reason for the transfer. Others state that Cabagan was transferred because economic activity appeared to shifting to the villages to the south, namely between the villages of Ugad and Luquilu, around three kilometers away.

The transfer was not without friction though. A number of Cabagan's inhabitants opposed the transfer. But the missionary's will prevailed. To underline his resolve, the missionary uprooted the Church of the old Cabagan and brought the images and other vestments to the new Cabagan.

When the Spaniards moved the town, they also endeavored to build a massive church and convent made of stone, brick and mortar. From 1877, until the Philippine Revolution in 1898, the Spaniards were still not able to complete the constructions needed for the new town.

== Geography ==
Cabagan is a land-locked municipality in the Cagayan River valley in the north of Luzon Island. The town center is located on the eastern banks of the Cagayan River.

Cabagan is 45 kilometres (28 mi) from the provincial capital Ilagan, and 474 kilometres (295 mi) from the capital Manila.

=== Barangays ===
Cabagan is politically subdivided into 26 barangays. Each barangay consists of puroks while some have sitios.

There are three barangays that are considered urban (highlighted in bold).

- Aggub
- **Anao**
- Angancasilian
- Balasig
- Cansan
- Casibarag Norte
- Casibarag Sur
- Catabayungan
- **Centro (Poblacion)**
- Cubag
- Garita
- Luquilu
- Mabangug
- Magassi
- Masipi East
- Masipi West (Magallones)
- Ngarag
- Pilig Abajo
- Pilig Alto
- San Antonio (Candanum)
- San Bernardo
- San Juan
- Saui
- Tallag
- **Ugad**
- Union

=== Climate ===
Climate data for Cabagan, Isabela
Month	Jan	Feb	Mar	Apr	May	Jun	Jul	Aug	Sep	Oct	Nov	Dec	Year
Mean daily maximum °C (°F)	29 (84)	30 (86)	32 (90)	35 (95)	35 (95)	35 (95)	34 (93)	33 (91)	32 (90)	31 (88)	30 (86)	28 (82)	32 (90)
Mean daily minimum °C (°F)	19 (66)	20 (68)	21 (70)	23 (73)	23 (73)	24 (75)	23 (73)	23 (73)	23 (73)	22 (72)	21 (70)	20 (68)	22 (71)
Average precipitation mm (inches)	31.2 (1.23)	23 (0.9)	27.7 (1.09)	28.1 (1.11)	113.5 (4.47)	141.4 (5.57)	176.4 (6.94)	236.6 (9.31)	224.9 (8.85)	247.7 (9.75)	222.9 (8.78)	178 (7.0)	1,651.4 (65)
Average rainy days	10	6	5	5	13	12	15	15	15	17	16	15	144
Source: World Weather Online (modeled/calculated data, not measured locally)

== Demographics ==
Population census of Cabagan

Year	Pop.	±% p.a.
1903	5,289	—
1918	13,112	+6.24%
1939	18,795	+1.73%
1948	21,651	+1.58%
1960	17,924	−1.56%
1970	23,370	+2.69%
1975	24,987	+1.35%
1980	28,908	+2.96%

Year	Pop.	±% p.a.
1990	34,999	+1.93%
1995	35,054	+0.03%
2000	41,536	+3.70%
2007	43,562	+0.66%
2010	45,732	+1.78%
2015	50,174	+1.78%
2020	53,897	+1.52%
2024	55,445	+0.68%

Source: Philippine Statistics Authority

In the 2024 census, the population of Cabagan was 55,445 people, with a density of 130 inhabitants per square kilometre or 340 inhabitants per square mile.

=== Language ===
Cabagan was part of the Irraya region and its language was Irraya. The Spaniards however, made the Ibanag language "The official language of the Valley", and had exerted all efforts to make everyone speak the dialect, leading to Irraya gradually disappearing. During colonial rule, people were discouraged or forbidden to speak the language as it was considered the language of the "pagans" at the time, the Kalingas, leading to connotations of Irraya speakers as ignorant people or mountain-dwellers.

The Irraya language is no longer spoken, except in a few barangays in Cabagan like San Bernardo and Tallag, wherein the Ibanag dialect gets interspersed with Irraya. Some elderly residents can also remember sentences in Irraya. Ilocano is also spoken in Cabagan because of migration of Ilocanos. English, being one of the official languages is used primarily in communication for government publications, local newsprints, road signs, commercial signs and in doing official business transactions. Tagalog, another official language and is also considered the national language is used as verbal communication channel between residents.

== Economy ==
Poverty incidence of Cabagan (%)

Source: Philippine Statistics Authority

== Culture ==
=== Pancit Cabagan ===
Cabagan is famous for its eponymously named 'Pansit Cabagan', a local dish that was introduced by Chinese trader Sia Lang in 1887 and has gained popularity in different parts of Luzon. There are several popular restaurants (locally called 'Panciterias') serving this dish along the main highway in Barangays Centro, Anao, Ugad and Cubag.

== Tourism ==
- Malasi Tree Park and Wildlife Sanctuary, a bird sanctuary located in Barangay San Antonio, declared by the Department of Environment and Natural Resources as a critical habitat for Philippine ducks and migratory and endemic species of birds are spotted regularly
- Cabagan Square Park in Barangay Centro, with its carousel which is the largest in the Philippines
- Fort Cabagan (former military fort), Municipal Hall at Barangay Centro
- Triangle Park, located at Barangay Ugad, where a towering led TV was installed and the giant kalesa can be seen
- Aggabao Hall, old entertainment hall of Cabagan located at Barangay Centro
- Josefina T. Albano Sports and Cultural Complex or the Cabagan Gymnasium, located at Barangay Centro
- Biwag Shrine at Barangay Tallag
- Tulap Falls, a waterfall in Barangay Masipi East
- Bonsur Creek, Bananao Rice Terraces at Barangay Masipi East
- St. Paul the Apostle Parish Church in Barangay Centro
- Religious Cross, Century Church bell, Century Well, Spanish Kiln near St. Paul the Apostle Parish Church
- Pansi Festival
- Kalesa-Kabayu-Kalaseru (KKK) Festival
- Sambali Dance

== Government ==
=== Local government ===
As a municipality in the Province of Isabela, government officials at the provincial and municipal levels are voted by the town. The provincial government has political jurisdiction over most local transactions of the municipal government.

The municipality of Cabagan is governed by a mayor, designated as its local chief executive, and by a municipal council as its legislative body in accordance with the Local Government Code. The mayor, vice mayor, and the municipal councilors are elected directly by the people through an election held every three years.

Barangays are also headed by elected officials: Barangay Captain, Barangay Council, whose members are called Barangay Councilors. The barangays have SK federation which represents the barangay, headed by SK chairperson and whose members are called SK councilors. All officials are also elected every three years.

=== Elected officials ===
Members of the Municipal Council (2022–2025)
Position	Name
Congressman	Antonio T. Albano
Mayor	Milet Mamauag
Vice-Mayor	Ferdinand R. Fugaban
Councilors	Sheila Marie Aggabao
Councilors	Dax Paolo Binag
Councilors	Ogga Acorda
Councilors	Reymar Zipagan
Councilors	Jun Baricaua

=== Congress representation ===
Cabagan, as a municipality, belongs to the first legislative district of the province of Isabela. The current representative is Tonypet Albano.

== Education ==
The Schools Division of Isabela governs the town's public education system. The division office is a field office of the DepEd in Cagayan Valley region. Cabagan Schools District office governs the public and private schools throughout the municipality.

=== Primary and elementary schools ===
- Aggub Elementary School
- Anao Elementary School
- Angancasilian Elementary School
- Balasig Elementary School
- Biwag Elementary School
- Cabagan Science Elementary School
- Candanum Elementary School
- Cansan Elementary School
- Casibarag Elementary School
- Casibarag Norte Elementary School
- Catabayungan Elementary School
- Garita Elementary School
- Luquilu Primary School
- Mabangug Elementary School
- Magallones Elementary School
- Magassi Elementary School
- Masipi Elementary School
- Ngarag Primary School
- Pilig Abajo Elementary School
- Pilig Alto Elementary School
- San Bernardo Elementary School
- San Juan Elementary School
- Saui Primary School
- Ugad Elementary School
- Union Primary School

=== Secondary schools ===
- Alfreda Albano National High School - Magassi
- Alfreda Albano National High School - Masipi Annex
- Cabagan Baptist School
- Cabagan Christian Nurture Center
- Cabagan Riverside National High School
- Cubag Integrated School
- Delfin Albano High School-Main
- Jenelle Duncan Memorial Christian School, Inc.
- Montessori De Isabela

=== Higher educational institutions ===
- Isabela State University
- Saint Ferdinand College

== Notable personalities ==
- Alex Pagulayan, a Filipino-Canadian professional pool and snooker player, the 2004 world champion in billiards, hails from Barangay San Juan.
- Rodolfo Albano III, Filipino politician, Representative of the First District of Isabela (1998-2001, 2004-2010, 2013–2019), Vice Governor (2010-2013) and governor of Isabela (since 2019)

== Media ==
- 99.5 MHz DWSA Friendly FM Community Radio

== See also ==
- Cabagan–Santa Maria Bridge
