= Saint Ferdinand College =

Roman Catholic college in Isabela, Philippines

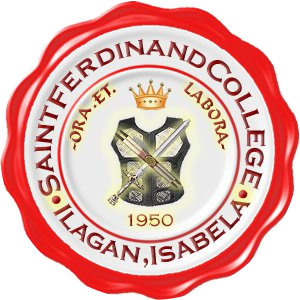
- Motto: Ora et Labora et Lege (Latin)
- Motto in English: Prayer and Work
- Type: Catholic School - Basic and Higher Education Institution
- Established: September 28, 1950
- Founders: Msgr. Ricardo A. Jamias and Judge Manuel Arranz - members of the Knight of Columbus IIagan Center, now Council 3705, Dr. Jose Valdez and Msgr. Alejandro Olalia
- Religious affiliation: Roman Catholic
- Academic affiliations: PACUCOA
- Chairman: Most Rev. Fr. David William V. Antonio, D.Ds.Th.D
- President: Rev. Fr. Edmundo C. Castañeda, Jr., Ph.D.
- Vice-president: Elena C. Ariola, Ph.D. (VP for Finance) and Charina G. Alejo, Ph.D. (VP for Academics)
- Principal: Jomarie L. Dela Cruz, MAEd (Elementary Department); Bethzaida S. Balingao, Ph.D. (Junior High School Department); Jocelyn M. Claravall, Ph.D. (Senior High School Department); Orlando R. Macaballug, MAEd (Elementary and High School Department - Satellite Campus)
- Location: Santa Ana Street, Ilagan City, 3300 Isabela, Philippines; 17°08′58″N 121°53′22″E
- Campus: Main Ilagan City, Isabela Satellite Cabagan, Isabela
- Patron saint: Saint Ferdinand of Castile
- Alma Mater song: SFC Hymn
- Colors: Yellow and Maroon
- Nickname: SFCian/s
- Website: www.sfc.edu.ph
- Location in Luzon Location in the Philippines

Saint Ferdinand College is a private, Catholic educational basic and higher education institution in Ilagan City, Isabela, Philippines. It was established in 1950 by the Knights of Columbus Ilagan Council 3705. Its formal operation began in school year 1951–1952, with classes offering from Kindergarten to College Level.

St. Ferdinand College is the only Catholic educational institution in Ilagan City, Isabela, Philippines, and is one of the leading educational institutions in Isabela duly recognized by the Commission on Higher Education (CHED) and the Philippine Association of Colleges and Universities Commission on Accreditation (PACUCOA). Being recognized for its good facilities and competent staff, SFC served as the venue for the 1999 National School Press Conference on February 8–12.

For several years now, SFC remains the source of students for scholarship admission to the Ateneo de Manila University and University of the Philippines in Region II. In-School Board Review for Criminology is now offered and it is presently linked with the University of Baguio. A Review Program for the Licensure Examination for Teachers (LET) has also started in Summer of 1999. This is a continuing service afforded by the school to help students prepare for the Licensure Examinations at an affordable cost.

At present, St. Ferdinand College has one satellite campus in Cabagan in the same province.

== History ==
St. Ferdinand College was established in September 1950, based on Christian democratic principles dedicated to the original objectives of its original founders, the Knights of Columbus Ilagan Council 3705.

St. Ferdinand College had its formal operation in the school year 1951-1952 and offered kindergarten up to college level. It started occupying three small and temporary buildings enough to accommodate a complete elementary school with only one section each per grade level; a complete secondary level with only seven sections; and a handful of college students enrolled in Liberal Arts and in Elementary Education.

In the first year of its existence, St. Ferdinand College was operated purely by lay teachers and administrators, but because of its desire to propagate a stronger and more firm Christian education, the late Rev. Msgr. Ricardo A. Jamias, one of the founders and spiritual director invited the Franciscan Sisters to take over the reins of the college from 1952 up to S.Y 1974–1975.

During the S.Y 1952–1953, the newly constructed main building was occupied. The permit was granted by the Bureau of Private Schools to open courses in Education and Commerce. Four years later, the college reaped the first crop of graduates at the college level. Full recognition of all courses offered was granted in its fourth and fifth years of operation.

The coming of the Franciscan sisters under the direction of Sr. Agnes Encarnacion gave an impetus to their enrollment and from then on there was a yearly increase in each of the three departments. The major turning point of the college came as a result of the opening of a new course in education, the BSEEd. There was then a great demand for graduates to finish this course. The majority of the public school teachers were only ETC graduates. These undergraduates rushed to SFC to enroll which resulted in a dramatic increase in the student population in the College Department.

The biggest problem facing the school as a result of the increase in enrollment was the lack of classrooms. The main building, which was occupied by the three departments, the library, the laboratories, and the offices, was not enough. The college had to look for means by which it could accommodate all the students. The school Board of Trustees decided to act and secured a loan for the construction of separate buildings for the elementary, secondary, and HE practices houses.

During the year 1962, the ROTC unit was activated which added more attraction to male students. A separate ROTC and Armory building was immediately constructed for that purpose. In the succeeding years, new major fields of learning were opened: Accounting, Banking and Finance, and Management in Commerce; English, Mathematics, History, Science, and Filipino under Education. This led to the establishment of a separate College of Arts and Sciences, and College of Commerce and Secretarial.

In 1965, the Graduate Course (the first throughout the valley) was opened. This led to the expansion of the library with the purchase of hundreds of volumes of books to meet the requirements arising from the increase in student enrollment.

Recognized by the government, all the school's graduate and postgraduate offerings are well-established, and have graduated many MA's, MBA's, and MPA's since. In 1993, a Ph.D. course was opened. The pioneer batch from this postgraduate course graduated in the SY 1995–1996.

The School of Midwifery was established in 1986. The Vocational Tech School was also put up in the year 1987 but it was closed years after because of dwindling enrollment.

The decade of the 90s has witnessed significant changes which have been taking place in college. Under permit 002 granted by the DECS, the School started to offer a Bachelor of Science in Nursing (BSN) in the S.Y. 1992–1993. Again, the School was in the national limelight when a BSN graduate in Batch '98 was one of the top notchers in the Nursing Licensure Examination. It was during the S.Y. 1993-1994 when the following courses were offered: Bachelor of Science in Management-major in Legal Management (which was also later closed); Two Year Medical Secretarial Courses. The school offered a Bachelor of Science in Criminology course during S.Y. 1994-95 under the headship of the dean of the AB Department.

Because of the massive transfer of students to SFC, Msgr. Ricardo Jamias Bldg. which houses the administrative offices, libraries, and classrooms of the College of Education and College of Arts and Sciences underwent massive renovations while the Our Lady of Lourdes Bldg. underwent finishing touches. A year earlier, the Our Lady of Visitation building was constructed to provide adequate and comfortable rooms for secondary students. In the year 1997, the Our Lady of Perpetual Help building was completed to meet the growing demands of elementary graders. Also, a multi-purpose laboratory was opened for the High School and Elementary for their Home Technology, food processing, textile and sewing, and handicraft-making practicum. A fourth floor has been added to the Lourdes building and a 500-seater auditorium complete with a sound and stage lighting system was constructed. The hall was named Arranz Auditorium in honor of the late Judge Manuel Arranz and Mrs. Magdalena Arranz, the school's first directress. The old seminary building across Mabini St. had been leased by the school for paramedical courses. The building has been completely rehabilitated and its laboratories were completely upgraded. Due to the increasing student population, the school likewise leased the old rectory and converted it into classrooms for the college department.

Two colleges under the supervision of their own deans were established, the College of Accountancy and the College of Criminology in S.Y. 1996–97. During that school year, new courses were offered namely, BS Biology and BS Nutrition and Dietetics. These, however, were closed two years after because of poor enrollment. The school envisions opening more courses in the next school year, 1999–2000. SFC is now in the process of securing permits from the Commission on Higher Education (CHED) for the possible operation of new courses which include BS Information Technology (BSIT), BS Information Management (BSIM), BS in Computer Science (BSCS), BSEd-Religious Education; Health Science; BSC-Public Administration and AB majors Political in Science and Economics.

== Accredited programs ==
To date, SFC has the following accredited programs:

Programs	Status	Period Covered
Elementary	Level I- Formal Accredited	February 4, 2008- February 2011
High School	Level I- Formal Accredited	February 4, 2008- February 2011
Criminology	Level I- Formal Accredited	March 3, 2008- March 2011
Business Administration	Level II- First Reaccreditation	July 7, 2008- July 2011
BSED	Level II- First Reaccreditation	October 6, 2008- October 2013
BEED	Level II- First Reaccreditation	October 6, 2008- October 2013
Nursing	Level II- Formal Accredited	March 2, 2009- March 2012
Liberal Arts	Level I- Formal Accredited	January 9, 2009- January 2014

== Patron Saint ==
Saint Ferdinand III of Castile is the school's patron saint.

== SFC Hymn ==
Beloved Alma Mater, all hail!

Fair gem of our Valley,

St. Ferdinand College, 'neath your standard we rally.

For you raise an army for Christ

whose royal blood runs red

for the glory of our Mother Church

a royal road they tread.

Our hearts beat high for you

within us, high ideals burn,

"For Christ the King!" our battle cry,

Ah! all of hell we spurn.

We pledge our oath of fealty,

yeah! Each of us your knight,

for God and country and for you,

We live and strive and fight.
