= Isabela Provincial Board =

Legislative body of the province of Isabela, Philippines

Isabela Provincial Board Sangguniang Panlalawigan ng Isabela

Type
- Type: Unicameral
- Term limits: 3 terms (9 years)

Leadership
- Presiding Officer: Francis Faustino A. Dy, Lakas-CMD since June 30, 2025

Structure
- Seats: 19 board members 1 ex officio presiding officer
- Political groups: PFP (6) Lakas (3) NPC (2) Aksyon (1) LDP (1) Nonpartisan (6)
- Length of term: 3 years
- Authority: Local Government Code of the Philippines

Elections
- Voting system: Multiple non-transferable vote (regular members); Indirect election (ex officio members); Acclamation (sectoral members)
- Last election: May 12, 2025
- Next election: May 15, 2028

Meeting place
- Isabela Provincial Capitol, Ilagan

The Isabela Provincial Board is the Sangguniang Panlalawigan (provincial legislature) of the Philippine province of Isabela.

The members are elected via plurality-at-large voting: the province is divided into six districts, each having two seats. A voter votes up to two names, with the top two candidates per district being elected. The vice governor is the ex officio presiding officer, and only votes to break ties. The vice governor is elected via the plurality voting system province-wide.

The districts used in appropriation of members is coextensive with the legislative districts of Isabela, with the exception that Santiago, an independent component city, is excluded in the fourth district.

Aside from the regular members, the board also includes the provincial federation presidents of the Liga ng mga Barangay (ABC, from its old name "Association of Barangay Captains"), the Sangguniang Kabataan (SK, youth councils) and the Philippine Councilors League (PCL). Isabela's provincial board also has reserved seats for the sectoral representatives for women, labor, and indigenous people.

== Apportionment ==
Elections	Seats per district						Ex officio seats	Reserved seats	Total seats
Elections	1st	2nd	3rd	4th	5th	6th	Ex officio seats	Reserved seats	Total seats
2010–13	3	2	3	2	—	—	3	2	15
2013–19	3	2	3	2	—	—	2	4	16
2019–22	2	2	2	2	2	2	3	3	18
2022–present	2	2	2	2	2	2	3	4	19

== List of members ==
=== Current members ===
These are the members after the 2025 local elections and 2023 barangay and SK elections:

- Vice Governor: Francis Faustino A. Dy (Lakas-CMD)

Seat	Board member	Party	Start of term	End of term
1st district	Evyn Jay C. Diaz	PFP	June 30, 2025	June 30, 2028
1st district	Emmanuel Joselito B. Añes	PFP	June 30, 2019	June 30, 2028
2nd district	Ed Christian S. Go	Lakas	June 30, 2019	June 30, 2028
2nd district	Angelica L. Reyes	Lakas	June 30, 2025	June 30, 2028
3rd district	Jose T. Panganiban Jr.	NPC	June 30, 2025	June 30, 2028
3rd district	Ramon Juan N. Reyes Jr.	NPC	June 30, 2019	June 30, 2028
4th district	Clifford R. Raspado	PFP	June 30, 2019	June 30, 2028
4th district	Abegail V. Sable	PFP	June 30, 2025	June 30, 2028
5th district	Jonathan Jose C. Calderon	Aksyon	June 30, 2025	June 30, 2028
5th district	Manuel Faustino U. Dy	LDP	June 30, 2022	June 30, 2028
6th district	Marco Paolo A. Meris	PFP	June 30, 2019	June 30, 2028
6th district	Amador A. Gaffud Jr.	PFP	June 30, 2022	June 30, 2028
ABC	Maria Katrina Jessica Dy	Nonpartisan	January 2024	January 1, 2026
PCL	Antonio Hui	Lakas	September 9, 2019	June 30, 2025
SK	Catherine Joy Legaspi	Nonpartisan	November 29, 2023	January 1, 2026
IPMR	Margarette Chin	Nonpartisan	July 2022	July 2025
Labor	Evyn Jay Diaz	Nonpartisan	August 30, 2022	August 30, 2025
Women	Lourdes Panganiban	Nonpartisan	July 2022	July 2025
Agriculture	Adrian Philip Baysac	Nonpartisan	July 2022	July 2025

=== Vice governor ===
Election year	Name	Party	Ref.
1988	Manuel T. Binag		
1992	Manuel T. Binag		
1995	Edwin C. Uy		
1998	Edwin C. Uy		
2001	Santiago P. Respicio		
2004	Ramon M. Reyes		
2007	Ramon M. Reyes		
2010	Rodolfo T. Albano III		
2013	Antonio T. Albano		
2016	Antonio T. Albano	UNA	
2019	Faustino G. Dy III	PDP–Laban	
2022	Faustino G. Dy III	PDP–Laban	
2025	Francis Faustino A. Dy	Lakas	

=== 1st district ===
- Population (2024):

Election year	Member (party)	Member (party)	Member (party)	Ref.
2016	Ric Justice E. Angobung (UNA)	Kiryll S. Bello (UNA)	Rolando L. Tugade (UNA)	
2019	Delfinito Emmanuel L. Albano (PDP–Laban)	Emmanuel Joselito B. Añes (Nacionalista)	—N/a	
2022	Delfinito Emmanuel L. Albano (Lakas)	Emmanuel Joselito B. Añes (Lakas)	—N/a	
2025	Evyn Jay C. Diaz (PFP)	Emmanuel Joselito B. Añes (PFP)	—N/a	

=== 2nd district ===
- Population (2024):

Election year	Member (party)	Member (party)	Ref.
2016	Ed Christopher S. Go (Liberal)	Faustino U. Dy, IV (NPC)	
2019	Ed Christian S. Go (Nacionalista)	Edgar R. Capuchino (Nacionalista)	
2022	Ed Christian S. Go (Aksyon)	Edgar R. Capuchino (Nacionalista)	
2025	Ed Christian S. Go (Lakas)	Angelica L. Reyes (Lakas)	

=== 3rd district ===
- Population (2024):

Election year	Member (party)	Member (party)	Member (party)	Ref.
2016	Randolph Joseph P. Arreola (NPC)	Manuel A. Alejandro (NPC)	Karen G. Abuan (NPC)	
2019	Randolph Joseph P. Arreola (NPC)	Ramon Juan N. Reyes, Jr. (NPC)	—N/a	
2022	Mary Grace D. Arreola (NPC)	Ramon Juan N. Reyes, Jr. (NPC)	—N/a	
2025	Jose T. Panganiban, Jr. (NPC)	Ramon Juan N. Reyes, Jr. (NPC)	—N/a	

=== 4th district ===
- Population (2024):

Election year	Member (party)	Member (party)	Ref.
2016	Abegail V. Sable (NPC)	Alfeedo V. Alili (NPC)	
2019	Abegail V. Sable (PDP–Laban)	Clifford R. Raspado (PDP–Laban)	
2022	Victor G. Dy (PDP–Laban)	Clifford R. Raspado (PDP–Laban)	
2025	Abegail V. Sable (PFP)	Clifford R. Raspado (PFP)	

=== 5th district ===
- Population (2024):

Election year	Member (party)	Member (party)	Ref.
2019	Faustino U. Dy, IV (PFP)	Edward S. Isidro (PFP)	
2022	Manuel Faustino U. Dy (LDP)	Edward S. Isidro (PFP)	
2025	Manuel Faustino U. Dy (LDP)	Jonathan Jose C. Calderon (Aksyon)	

=== 6th district ===
- Population (2024):

Election year	Member (party)	Member (party)	Ref.
2019	Alfredo V. Alili (PDP–Laban)	Marco Paolo A. Meris (PDP–Laban)	
2022	Amador A. Gaffud Jr. (PDP–Laban)	Marco Paolo A. Meris (Aksyon)	
2025	Amador A. Gaffud Jr. (PFP)	Marco Paolo A. Meris (PFP)	
