= Isabela's 1st congressional district =

Legislative district of the Philippines

- Constituency for the House of Representatives of the Philippines
- Boundary of Isabela's 1st congressional district in Isabela

- Location of Isabela within the Philippines
- Province: Isabela
- Region: Cagayan Valley
- Population: 399,196 (2020)
- Electorate: 265,453 (2025)
- Major settlements: 9 LGUs: Cities; Ilagan; Municipalities; Cabagan; Delfin Albano; Divilacan; Maconacon; San Pablo; Santa Maria; Santo Tomas; Tumauini
- Area: 4,519.71 km^{2} (1,745.07 sq mi)

Current constituency
- Created: 1987
- Representative: Antonio T. Albano
- Political party: PFP
- Congressional bloc: Majority

Isabela's 1st congressional district is one of the six congressional districts of the Philippines in the province of Isabela. It has been represented in the House of Representatives since 1987. The district consists of the capital city of Ilagan and the northern municipalities of Cabagan, Delfin Albano, Divilacan, Maconacon, San Pablo, Santa Maria, Santo Tomas and Tumauini. The municipality of Palanan was part of this district until it was redistricted to the 2nd district, effective in 2019. It is currently represented in the 20th Congress by Antonio T. Albano of the Partido Federal ng Pilipinas (PFP).

== Representation history ==
#	Image	Member	Term of office		Congress	Party	Electoral history	Constituent LGUs
#	Image	Member	Start	End	Congress	Party	Electoral history	Constituent LGUs
=== Isabela's 1st district for the House of Representatives of the Philippines ===
District created February 2, 1987 from Isabela's at-large district.
1		Rodolfo Albano Jr.	June 30, 1987	June 30, 1998	8th	KBL	Elected in 1987.	1987–2019; Cabagan, Delfin Albano, Divilacan, Ilagan, Maconacon, Palanan, San Pablo, Santa Maria, Santo Tomas, Tumauini
1		Rodolfo Albano Jr.	June 30, 1987	June 30, 1998	9th	KBL	Re-elected in 1992.	1987–2019; Cabagan, Delfin Albano, Divilacan, Ilagan, Maconacon, Palanan, San Pablo, Santa Maria, Santo Tomas, Tumauini
1		Rodolfo Albano Jr.	June 30, 1987	June 30, 1998	10th	Lakas	Re-elected in 1995.	1987–2019; Cabagan, Delfin Albano, Divilacan, Ilagan, Maconacon, Palanan, San Pablo, Santa Maria, Santo Tomas, Tumauini
2		Rodolfo Albano III	June 30, 1998	June 30, 2001	11th	Lakas	Elected in 1998.	1987–2019; Cabagan, Delfin Albano, Divilacan, Ilagan, Maconacon, Palanan, San Pablo, Santa Maria, Santo Tomas, Tumauini
(1)		Rodolfo Albano Jr.	June 30, 2001	January 21, 2004	12th	Lakas	Elected in 2001. Resigned on appointment as commissioner of the Energy Regulatory Commission.	1987–2019; Cabagan, Delfin Albano, Divilacan, Ilagan, Maconacon, Palanan, San Pablo, Santa Maria, Santo Tomas, Tumauini
(2)		Rodolfo Albano III	June 30, 2004	June 30, 2010	13th	KAMPI	Elected in 2004.	1987–2019; Cabagan, Delfin Albano, Divilacan, Ilagan, Maconacon, Palanan, San Pablo, Santa Maria, Santo Tomas, Tumauini
(2)		Rodolfo Albano III	June 30, 2004	June 30, 2010	14th	Lakas	Re-elected in 2007.	1987–2019; Cabagan, Delfin Albano, Divilacan, Ilagan, Maconacon, Palanan, San Pablo, Santa Maria, Santo Tomas, Tumauini
(1)		Rodolfo Albano Jr.	June 30, 2010	June 30, 2013	15th	NPC	Elected in 2010.	1987–2019; Cabagan, Delfin Albano, Divilacan, Ilagan, Maconacon, Palanan, San Pablo, Santa Maria, Santo Tomas, Tumauini
(2)		Rodolfo Albano III	June 30, 2013	June 30, 2019	16th	NPC	Elected in 2013.	1987–2019; Cabagan, Delfin Albano, Divilacan, Ilagan, Maconacon, Palanan, San Pablo, Santa Maria, Santo Tomas, Tumauini
(2)		Rodolfo Albano III	June 30, 2013	June 30, 2019	17th	NPC	Re-elected in 2016.	1987–2019; Cabagan, Delfin Albano, Divilacan, Ilagan, Maconacon, Palanan, San Pablo, Santa Maria, Santo Tomas, Tumauini
3		Tonypet Albano	June 30, 2019	Incumbent	18th	NUP	Elected in 2019.	2019–present Cabagan, Delfin Albano, Divilacan, Ilagan, Maconacon, San Pablo, Santa Maria, Santo Tomas, Tumauini
3		Tonypet Albano	June 30, 2019	Incumbent	19th	Lakas	Re-elected in 2022.	2019–present Cabagan, Delfin Albano, Divilacan, Ilagan, Maconacon, San Pablo, Santa Maria, Santo Tomas, Tumauini
3		Tonypet Albano	June 30, 2019	Incumbent	20th	PFP	Re-elected in 2025.	2019–present Cabagan, Delfin Albano, Divilacan, Ilagan, Maconacon, San Pablo, Santa Maria, Santo Tomas, Tumauini

== Election results ==
=== 2025 ===
Candidate	Party	Votes	%
Tonypet Albano (incumbent)	Lakas–CMD	172,333	100.00
Total		172,333	100.00
Valid votes		172,333	79.06
Invalid/blank votes		45,655	20.94
Total votes		217,988	100.00
Registered voters/turnout		265,453	82.12
Lakas–CMD hold			
Source: Commission on Elections

=== 2022 ===
2022 Philippine House of Representatives election in Isabela's 1st District
Party	Candidate	Votes	%
Lakas	Antonio "Tonypet" Albano	176,265	97.60%
Independent	Stephen Soliven	4,337	2.40%
Total votes		180,602	100.00%

== See also ==
- Legislative districts of Isabela
