= Isabela National High School =

Public school in Isabela, Philippines

Location
- Claravall St., San Vicente, Ilagan City, Isabela; Philippines; 17°08′40″N 121°53′15″E

Information
- Type: Public Secondary National School
- Motto: Honor and Glory
- Established: June 1904
- Principal: Marie Rose P. Ramos
- Campus: City of Ilagan
- Color: Blue
- Nickname: INHSians
- Affiliations: Department of Education
- Website: Isabela National High School

The Isabela National High School is a public educational institution established in Ilagan, Isabela, Philippines. It was founded in 1904, making it the oldest public high school in the Cagayan Valley region. It was named Isabela High School before it was converted into a national high school in 1982. It is the only educational institution offering the Open High School Program in the entire Cagayan Valley region. The school is administered by Eduardo C. Escorpiso Jr., the head of the Schools Division of the City of Ilagan. The school's current principal is Marie Rose P. Ramos.

== Education programs ==
Isabela National High School implements programs for students who have high aptitudes in certain areas:

- Basic Education Curriculum (BEC)
- K-12 Program
- Open High School Program (OHSP)
- Science, Technology and Engineering Program (STE)
- Special Program in the Arts (SPA)
- Special Program in Foreign Language (SPFL)
- Special Program in Journalism (SPJ)
- Special Program in Sports (SPS)

Senior High School Strands (Programs)

- Science, Technology, Engineering and Mathematics (STEM)
- Accountancy, Business, and Management (ABM)
- Humanities and Social Sciences (HUMSS)
- Arts and Design Track (ADT)

The school is currently implementing grades seven to 12 by the K-12 program of the Department of Education.

== Facilities ==
These facilities includes the following:

- Open Pavilion is being used for flag raising and flag rites ceremonies, school activity programs, other curricular activities and special announcements from school administrators, announcements from student government leaders including various special guests and visitors.
- Samuel F. Adelan Learning Center houses library materials for use by the school staff, students and visitors. It was built on the site of the school's old library.
- Multi-purpose Hall is being used for the conduct of school programs and activities administered by the school. Seminars and lectures are usually conducted in this hall.
- Quadrangle houses the Guidance Office and other student services.
- Nuñes Hall houses the administration office, which includes the office of the principal, school registrar's office, and accounting and various offices.
- Computer Laboratory hosts computers for access to the Internet.

== Supreme learner government ==
Aside from the Supreme Secondary Learner Government, the Isabela National High School's various student clubs and organizations recognized by the school include:

- Kapisanang Pilipino
- English Club
- DebOraDecS Club
- Math Club
- YES-O
- PSYSC
- Barkada Kontra Bisyo (BKB)
- MAPEH Club
- Red Cross Youth
- Peer Facilitators
- Girl Scouts of the Philippines
- Boy Scouts of the Philippines
- Arts Club
- Drum & Lyre Club
- CYBE
- VITA Club
- Nexus
- SUPERPRES
- Elites
- TLE Club
- CHAMPIONS

== Notable personalities ==
- Oscar Martinez was a former school principal of Isabela National High School who ran for a public office as City Councilor in Ilagan City but failed to win the Philippine 2013 local election.
