= Isabela's at-large congressional district =

Legislative district of the Philippines

Isabela's at-large congressional district refers to the lone congressional district of the Philippines in the province of Isabela for various national legislatures before 1987. The province elected its representatives province-wide at-large from its reorganization under Article 6 of the Decreto de 18 junio de 1898 y las instrucciones sobre el régimen de las provincias y pueblos for the Malolos Congress in 1898 until it was reapportioned in 1987 under Section 1 of the ordinance annex of the 1987 Constitution of the Philippines into a first, second, third and fourth district. It was a single-member district throughout the ten legislatures of the Insular Government of the Philippine Islands from 1907 to 1935, the three legislatures of the Philippine Commonwealth from 1935 to 1946, and the seven congresses of the Third Philippine Republic from 1946 to 1972.

On three occasions in its history, Isabela sent more than one member to the national legislatures who were also elected or appointed at-large. Three representatives were sent to the National Assembly (Malolos Congress) of the First Philippine Republic from 1898 to 1901, two representatives to the National Assembly of the Second Philippine Republic from 1943 to 1944, and three representatives to the national parliament of the Fourth Philippine Republic from 1984 to 1986.

After 1986, all representatives were elected from congressional districts.

== Representation history ==
#	Term of office		National Assembly	Seat A				Seat B				Seat C			
#	Start	End	National Assembly	Image	Member	Party	Electoral history	Image	Member	Party	Electoral history	Image	Member	Party	Electoral history
=== Isabela de Luzon's at-large district for the Malolos Congress ===
District created June 18, 1898.
–	September 15, 1898	March 23, 1901	1st		Raymundo Alindada	Nonpartisan	Elected in 1898.		Abelardo Guzmán	Nonpartisan	Elected in 1898.		Eustacio del Rosario	Nonpartisan	Elected in 1898.
#	Term of office		Legislature	Single seat				Seats eliminated							
#	Start	End	Legislature	Image	Member	Party	Electoral history	Seats eliminated							
=== Isabela's at-large district for the Philippine Assembly ===								Seats eliminated							
District re-created January 9, 1907.								Seats eliminated							
1	October 16, 1907	January 20, 1908	1st		Nicasio P. Claraváll	Progresista	Elected in 1907. Election annulled by the Assembly after an electoral protest.	Seats eliminated							
2	January 20, 1908	March 18, 1909	1st		Dimas Guzmán	Nacionalista	Declared winner of 1907 elections. Died.	Seats eliminated							
3	October 16, 1909	October 16, 1916	2nd		Eliseo Claraváll	Progresista	Elected in 1909.	Seats eliminated							
3	October 16, 1909	October 16, 1916	3rd		Eliseo Claraváll	Progresista	Re-elected in 1912.	Seats eliminated							
#	Term of office		Legislature	Single seat				Seats eliminated							
#	Start	End	Legislature	Image	Member	Party	Electoral history	Seats eliminated							
=== Isabela's at-large district for the House of Representatives of the Philippine Islands ===								Seats eliminated							
4	October 16, 1916	June 3, 1919	4th		Mauro Verzosa	Nacionalista	Elected in 1916.	Seats eliminated							
5	June 3, 1919	June 6, 1922	5th		Miguel Binag	Nacionalista	Elected in 1919.	Seats eliminated							
6	June 6, 1922	June 2, 1925	6th		Tolentino Verzosa	Nacionalista; Colectivista	Elected in 1922.	Seats eliminated							
7	June 2, 1925	June 5, 1928	7th		Manuel Nieto	Nacionalista; Consolidado	Elected in 1925.	Seats eliminated							
8	June 5, 1928	June 2, 1931	8th		Pascual Paguirigan	Nacionalista; Consolidado	Elected in 1928.	Seats eliminated							
9	June 2, 1931	June 5, 1934	9th		Silvestre B. Macutay	Nacionalista; Consolidado	Elected in 1931.	Seats eliminated							
10	June 5, 1934	September 16, 1935	10th		Silvino M. Gumpal	Nacionalista; Demócrata Pro-Independencia	Elected in 1934.	Seats eliminated							
#	Term of office		National Assembly	Single seat				Seats eliminated							
#	Start	End	National Assembly	Image	Member	Party	Electoral history	Seats eliminated							
=== Isabela's at-large district for the National Assembly (Commonwealth of the Philippines) ===								Seats eliminated							
(4)	September 16, 1935	December 30, 1941	1st		Mauro Verzosa	Nacionalista; Democrático	Elected in 1935.	Seats eliminated							
(4)	September 16, 1935	December 30, 1941	2nd		Mauro Verzosa	Nacionalista	Re-elected in 1938.	Seats eliminated							
#	Term of office		National Assembly	Seat A				Seat B				Seats restored			
#	Start	End	National Assembly	Image	Member	Party	Electoral history	Image	Member	Party	Electoral history	Seats restored			
=== Isabela's at-large district for the National Assembly (Second Philippine Republic) ===												Seats restored			
District re-created September 7, 1943.												Seats restored			
–	September 25, 1943	February 2, 1944	1st		Gregorio P. Formoso	KALIBAPI	Elected in 1943.		Lino J. Castillejo	KALIBAPI	Appointed as an ex officio member.	Seats restored			
#	Term of office		Common wealth Congress	Single seat				Seats eliminated							
#	Start	End	Common wealth Congress	Image	Member	Party	Electoral history	Seats eliminated							
=== Isabela's at-large district for the House of Representatives of the Commonwealth of the Philippines ===								Seats eliminated							
District re-created May 24, 1945.								Seats eliminated							
11	June 9, 1945	May 25, 1946	1st		Lino J. Castillejo	Nacionalista	Elected in 1941.	Seats eliminated							
#	Term of office		Congress	Single seat				Seats eliminated							
#	Start	End	Congress	Image	Member	Party	Electoral history	Seats eliminated							
=== Isabela's at-large district for the House of Representatives of the Philippines ===								Seats eliminated							
12	May 25, 1946	December 30, 1949	1st		Domingo Paguirigan	Liberal	Elected in 1946.	Seats eliminated							
13	December 30, 1949	January 23, 1957	2nd		Samuel F. Reyes	Liberal	Elected in 1949.	Seats eliminated							
13	December 30, 1949	January 23, 1957	3rd		Samuel F. Reyes	Liberal	Re-elected in 1953. Election annulled by the House electoral tribunal after an electoral protest.	Seats eliminated							
14	January 23, 1957	December 30, 1965	3rd		Delfín B. Albano	Nacionalista	Declared winner of 1953 elections.	Seats eliminated							
14	January 23, 1957	December 30, 1965	4th		Delfín B. Albano	Nacionalista	Re-elected in 1957.	Seats eliminated							
14	January 23, 1957	December 30, 1965	5th		Delfín B. Albano	Nacionalista	Re-elected in 1961. Oath of office deferred to 1963 due to electoral protest.	Seats eliminated							
15	December 30, 1965	December 30, 1969	6th		Melanio Singson	Liberal	Elected in 1965.	Seats eliminated							
16	December 30, 1969	September 23, 1972	7th		Rodolfo B. Albano Jr.	Nacionalista	Elected in 1969. Removed from office after imposition of martial law.	Seats eliminated							
District dissolved into the seven-seat Region II's at-large district for the Interim Batasang Pambansa.								Seats eliminated							
#	Term of office		Batasang Pambansa	Seat A				Seat B				Seat C			
#	Start	End	Batasang Pambansa	Image	Member	Party	Electoral history	Image	Member	Party	Electoral history	Image	Member	Party	Electoral history
=== Isabela's at-large district for the Regular Batasang Pambansa ===
District re-created February 1, 1984.
–	July 23, 1984	March 25, 1986	2nd		Rodolfo B. Albano Jr.	KBL	Elected in 1984.		Prospero G. Bello	KBL	Elected in 1984.		Simplicio B. Domingo Jr.	KBL	Elected in 1984.
District dissolved into Isabela's 1st, 2nd, 3rd and 4th districts.

== See also ==
- Legislative districts of Isabela
