= Energy Regulatory Commission (Philippines) =

Electricity industry regulator in the Philippines

Agency overview
- Formed: June 8, 2001; 25 years ago
- Preceding agency: Energy Regulatory Board
- Jurisdiction: Government of the Philippines
- Headquarters: Pasig, Philippines
- Employees: 305 (2024)
- Agency executive: Monalisa C. Dimalanta, Chairman
- Website: www.erc.gov.ph

The Energy Regulatory Commission (ERC; Filipino: Komisyong Nangangasiwa sa Enerhiya) is an independent, quasi-judicial regulatory body electric power industry regulator in the Philippines. Its function is to regulate and maintain power service in the country. It was established and created on June 8, 2001, following the enactment of Republic Act No. 9136, or the Electric Power Industry Reform Act of 2001 (EPIRA).

== Primary duties ==
The primary responsibilities focused by the ERC are the following:

- To ensure consumer education and protection
- To promote the competitive operations in the electricity market.

== History ==
=== Coastwise Rate Commission ===
The regulation of public services started before in 1902, with the enactment of the Act No. 520 or the Coastwise Trade Act on November 17, 1902, led to the creation of the Coastwise Rate Commission. The responsibility of the commission was to classify vessels, merchandise, and passengers for coastwise trade and fixing maximum rates for transportation.

The commission consisted of three members appointed by the Civil Governor.

=== Supervising Railway Expert ===
In 1906, Act. No 1507 was enacted, creating the position of Supervising Railway Expert in the Philippines. The law aimed to defined the duties of the position and provide for other related matters. It is responsible for advising railroad construction, overseeing operations, and conducting investigations, with the power to examine records and accounts, while being entitled to a salary and leave of absence.

The Governor-General is responsible for appointing the Supervising Railway Expert with the advice and consent of the Philippine Commission, while the Philippine Commission is responsible for providing consent for the appointment of the Supervising Railway Expert.
