= Rodolfo Albano III =

Filipino politician (born 1959)

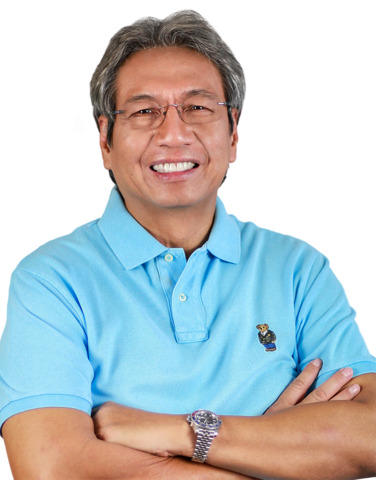

33rd Governor of Isabela
- Incumbent
- Assumed office June 30, 2019
- Vice Governor: Faustino Dy III (2019–2025); Francis Dy (2025–present)
- Preceded by: Faustino Dy III

12th Vice Governor of Isabela
- In office June 30, 2010 – June 30, 2013
- Governor: Faustino Dy III
- Preceded by: Ramon M. Reyes
- Succeeded by: Tonypet Albano

Member of House of Representatives of the Philippines from Isabela's 1st District
- In office June 30, 2013 – June 30, 2019
- Preceded by: Rodolfo B. Albano, Jr.
- Succeeded by: Rodolfo B. Albano, Jr.
- In office June 30, 2004 – June 30, 2010
- Preceded by: Rodolfo B. Albano, Jr.
- Succeeded by: Rodolfo B. Albano, Jr.
- In office June 30, 1998 – June 30, 2001
- Preceded by: Rodolfo B. Albano, Jr.
- Succeeded by: Tonypet Albano

Personal details
- Born: March 2, 1959 (age 67) Cabagan, Isabela, Philippines
- Party: PFP (2024–present)
- Other political affiliations: PDP (2018–2024); Nacionalista (2015–2018); NPC (2012–2015); Lakas (1998–2012); KAMPI (2004–2008)
- Spouse: Mylene Garcia-Albano
- Children: 1
- Parent(s): Rodolfo Albano Jr. (father); Josefina Taguinod (mother)
- Education: Ateneo De Manila University; De La Salle University (AB)

Rodolfo "Rodito" Taguinod Albano III (born March 2, 1959) is a Filipino politician. He is currently serving as the governor of Isabela since 2019. He served as a representative of the Isabela's 1st congressional district from 2013 to 2019, a position he previously held from 2004 to 2010 and from 1998 to 2001. He also served as vice governor of Isabela from 2010 to 2013.

== Early life and education ==
Governor Rodolfo “Rodito” Taguinod Albano III was born on March 2, 1959 in Cabagan, Isabela. He is the eldest of six children of the late Congressman Rodolfo B. Albano, Jr. and Josefina Taguinod-Albano. He completed his elementary and secondary education at La Salle Greenhills and earned his Bachelor of Arts in Political Science degree from De La Salle University.

== Political career ==
In 1998, Albano was first elected as representative for first district of Isabela until 2004.

In 2004, Albano returned as representative for first district of Isabela for two terms.

In 2010, Albano became a vice governor of Isabela until 2013.

In 2013, Albano returned again as representative for first district of Isabela for two terms.

In 2019, Albano was elected as governor of Isabela after he succeeded Bojie Dy.

== Personal life ==
He is married to Mylene Garcia-Albano, the first Filipina Ambassador to Japan and former representative for 2nd district of Davao City from 2010 to 2019. They are blessed with one child, Rafael Alfredo Albano.
