= Tonypet Albano =

Filipino politician (born 1965)

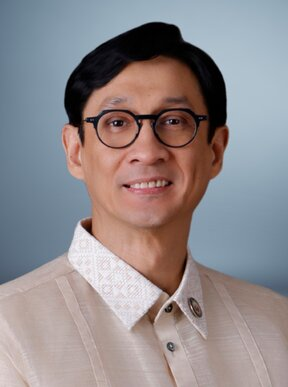
- Official portrait, 2025

Deputy Speaker of the House of Representatives of the Philippines
- In office November 7, 2023 – June 30, 2025
- House Speaker: Martin Romualdez
- Preceded by: Gloria Macapagal Arroyo

Member of the Philippine House of Representatives from Isabela's 1st district
- Incumbent
- Assumed office June 30, 2019
- Preceded by: Rodolfo Albano III

13th Vice Governor of Isabela
- In office June 30, 2013 – June 30, 2019
- Governor: Faustino Dy III
- Preceded by: Rodolfo Albano III
- Succeeded by: Faustino Dy III

President of the Radio Philippines Network
- In office 2009–2012
- Preceded by: Orly Mercado
- Succeeded by: Robert Rivera

Chairman of the Radio Philippines Network
- In office 2007–2011
- Preceded by: Mona Valisno
- Succeeded by: Wilson Tieng

Personal details
- Born: Antonio Taguinod Albano; November 26, 1965 (age 60) Quezon City, Philippines
- Party: PFP (2026–present)
- Other political affiliations: Lakas (2021–2026); PDP (2019–2021); UNA (2016–2019); Independent (2013–2016)
- Spouse: Hannah D'Avanzo (m. 2026)
- Parent(s): Rodolfo Albano Jr. (father); Josefina Taguinod (mother)
- Profession: Politician

Antonio "Tonypet" Taguinod Albano (born November 26, 1965) is a Filipino politician serving as member of the Philippine House of Representatives for the 1st district of Isabela since 2019. He served as a Deputy Speaker from 2023 to 2025. He also previously served as Vice Governor of Isabela from 2013 to 2019, chairman of Radio Philippines Network Inc. from 2007 to 2011, and as president and CEO of the same network from 2009 to 2012.

== Early life and education ==
Albano is the son of Rodolfo Albano Jr., a former congressman of Isabela, and Josefina Sia Taguinod, a school teacher. He is among six siblings, which include Rodolfo III, a former congressman and governor of Isabela.

Albano studied at La Salle Green Hills and received a Bachelor of Arts degree in Political Science from the University of California, Los Angeles.

== Political career ==
=== House of Representatives (2019–present) ===
He was elected representative of the 1st district of Isabela in 2019. He is one of the 70 lawmakers who voted to reject the franchise of ABS-CBN.

He was re-elected in 2022 and 2025.

== Personal life ==
Albano married Filipina-American journalist and content creator Hannah J. D'Avanzo in 2026.
