= Telegraphic transfer =

Method of transferring money

Telegraphic Transfer or telex transfer (TT) is a term used to refer to an electronic funds transfer. Although the term is historic and the technology it describes is no longer in use, the telegraphic transfer name is still used today in several countries where it has become synonymous with an international Society for Worldwide Interbank Financial Telecommunication (SWIFT) transfer.

== History ==
Historically telegraphic transfer meant a cablegram from one bank to another in order to effect the transfer of money, hence the name. This was later replaced by a message directly between banks via a telex network and then later by an electronic funds transfer. Despite the obsolescence of the technology that spawned the term, the term is still in use today and usually used to describe an international electronic bank transfer.

== Current use ==
=== Japan ===
Unlike its use in other countries, in Japan, "telegraphic transfer" has become the industry term for quoting retail exchange rates (larger quantities are quoted individually), and is divided into three rates, stated in yen, from the point of view of the quoting bank:

- TTM: Telegraphic Transfer Middle rate (mid price)
- TTS: Telegraphic Transfer Selling rate (ask price)
- TTB: Telegraphic Transfer Buying rate (bid price)

The middle rate is the average of the buying and selling rate, and these trade at a fixed bid–offer spread (in yen). For example, the USD is quoted with a spread of 2 JPY, so if the mid-market rate is 100 JPY = US$1, the rates are as follows:

- TTS: 101 JPY: bank will charge more than mid price to sell USD
- TTM: 100 JPY: average, bank does not trade at this price
- TTB: 99 JPY: bank will pay less than mid price to buy USD

These rates are published daily by major Japanese banks, and used for accounting and tax calculations, in addition to retail use.

=== Singapore ===
The term Telegraphic Transfer is a frequently used term in Singapore to describe cross-border funds transfer. Other less commonly used terms in Singapore are wire transfer and bank transfer.

=== United Kingdom ===
The term is now most often used in UK banking and in law to refer to either a domestic transfers by a CHAPS or an international transfer by SWIFT.

The term is also sometimes incorrectly used to describe other electronic funds transfer methods such as low cost everyday payment methods such as BACS (Bankers' Automated Clearing Services) payments, Faster Payments Service and SEPA credit transfers.

== See also ==
- Wire transfer
