= Bid–ask matrix =

The bid–ask matrix is a matrix with elements corresponding with exchange rates between the assets. These rates are in physical units (e.g. number of stocks) and not with respect to any numeraire. The $(i,j)$ element of the matrix is the number of units of asset $i$ which can be exchanged for 1 unit of asset $j$.

== Mathematical definition ==
A $d \times d$ matrix $\Pi = \left[\pi_{ij}\right]_{1 \leq i,j \leq d}$ is a bid-ask matrix, if

1. $\pi_{ij} > 0$ for $1 \leq i,j \leq d$. Any trade has a positive exchange rate.
2. $\pi_{ii} = 1$ for $1 \leq i \leq d$. Can always trade 1 unit with itself.
3. $\pi_{ij} \leq \pi_{ik}\pi_{kj}$ for $1 \leq i,j,k \leq d$. A direct exchange is always at most as expensive as a chain of exchanges.

== Example ==
Assume a market with 2 assets (A and B), such that $x$ units of A can be exchanged for 1 unit of B, and $y$ units of B can be exchanged for 1 unit of A. Then the bid–ask matrix $\Pi$ is:

$$\Pi = \begin{bmatrix}
1 & x \\
y & 1
\end{bmatrix}$$

It is required that $xy\ge1$ by rule 3.

With 3 assets, let $a_{ij}$ be the number of units of i traded for 1 unit of j. The bid–ask matrix is:

$$\Pi = \begin{bmatrix}
1 & a_{12} & a_{13}\\
a_{21} & 1 & a_{23}\\
a_{31}& a_{32}& 1
\end{bmatrix}$$

Rule 3 applies the following inequalities:

- $a_{12}a_{21}\ge1$
- $a_{13}a_{31}\ge1$
- $a_{23}a_{32}\ge1$
- $a_{13}a_{32}\ge a_{12}$
- $a_{23}a_{31}\ge a_{21}$
- $a_{12}a_{23}\ge a_{13}$
- $a_{32}a_{21}\ge a_{31}$
- $a_{21}a_{13}\ge a_{23}$
- $a_{31}a_{12}\ge a_{32}$

For higher values of d, note that 3-way trading satisfies Rule 3 as

$$x_{ik}x_{kl}x_{lj}\ge x_{il}x_{lj}\ge x_{ij}$$

== Relation to solvency cone ==
If given a bid–ask matrix $\Pi$ for $d$ assets such that $\Pi = \left(\pi^{ij}\right)_{1 \leq i,j \leq d}$ and $m \leq d$ is the number of assets which with any non-negative quantity of them can be "discarded" (traditionally $m = d$). Then the solvency cone $K(\Pi) \subset \mathbb{R}^d$ is the convex cone spanned by the unit vectors $e^i, 1 \leq i \leq m$ and the vectors $\pi^{ij}e^i-e^j, 1 \leq i,j \leq d$.

Similarly given a (constant) solvency cone it is possible to extract the bid–ask matrix from the bounding vectors.

== Notes ==
- The bid–ask spread for pair $(i,j)$ is $\left\{\frac{1}{\pi_{ji}},\pi_{ij}\right\}$.
- If $\pi_{ij} = \frac{1}{\pi_{ji}}$ then that pair is frictionless.
- If a subset $\prod_s\pi_{ij} = \frac{1}{\prod_s\pi_{ji}}$ then that subset is frictionless.

== Arbitrage in bid-ask matrices ==
Arbitrage is where a profit is guaranteed.

If Rule 3 from above is true, then a bid-ask matrix (BAM) is arbitrage-free, otherwise arbitrage is present via buying from a middle vendor and then selling back to source.

=== Iterative computation ===
A method to determine if a BAM is arbitrage-free is as follows.

Consider n assets, with a BAM $\pi_n$ and a portfolio $P_n$. Then

$$P_n\pi_n = V_n$$

where the i-th entry of $V_n$ is the value of $P_n$ in terms of asset i.

Then the tensor product defined by

$$V_n \square V_n = \frac{v_i}{v_j}$$

should resemble $\pi_n$.
