= Santo Tomas, Isabela =

Municipality in Isabela, Philippines

Santo Tomas
- Municipality
- Municipality of Santo Tomas
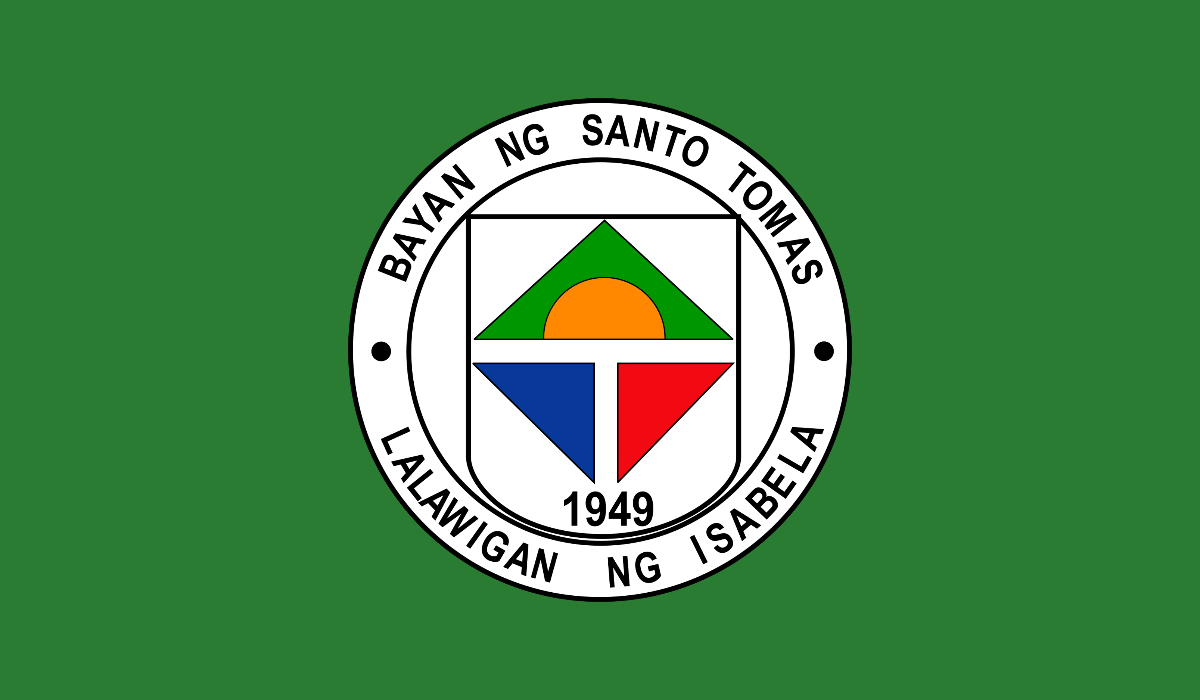
- Flag Seal

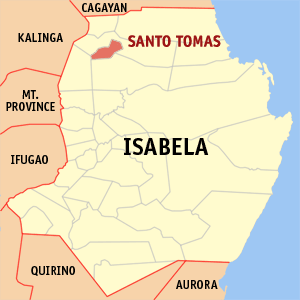
- Map of Isabela with Santo Tomas highlighted
- Interactive map of Santo Tomas
- Location within the Philippines
- Coordinates: 17°24′N 121°46′E
- Country: Philippines
- Region: Cagayan Valley
- Province: Isabela
- District: 1st district
- Founded: July 1, 1949
- Barangays: 27 (see Barangays)

Government
  - Type: Sangguniang Bayan
  - Mayor: Leandro Antonio "LA" P. Talaue
  - Vice Mayor: Antonio M. Talaue, Sr.
  - Representative: Antonio T. Albano
  - Electorate: 17,760 voters (2025)

Area
  - Total: 60.70 km^{2} (23.44 sq mi)
- Elevation: 35 m (115 ft)
- Highest elevation: 66 m (217 ft)
- Lowest elevation: 16 m (52 ft)

Population (2024 census)
  - Total: 25,997
  - Density: 428.3/km^{2} (1,109/sq mi)
  - Households: 5,578

Economy
  - Income class: 3rd municipal income class
  - Poverty incidence: 18.8% (2023)
  - Revenue: ₱ 152.2 million (2024)
  - Assets: ₱ 295.4 million (2024)
  - Expenditure: ₱ 133.5 million (2024)
  - Liabilities: ₱ 145 million (2024)

Service provider
  - Electricity: Isabela 2 Electric Cooperative (ISELCO 2)
- Time zone: UTC+8 (PST)
- ZIP code: 3327
- PSGC: 0203136000
- IDD : area code: +63 (0)78
- Native languages: Ibanag; Ilocano; Tagalog

Santo Tomas, officially the Municipality of Santo Tomas (Ibanag: Ili na Santo Tomás; Ilocano: Ili ti Santo Tomás; Tagalog: Bayan ng Santo Tomás), is a municipality in the province of Isabela, Philippines. According to the 2024 census, it has a population of 25,997 people.

== History ==
The municipality was established in 1949 from several barrios of Cabagan.

In 1952, Santo Tomas lost two barrios when the barrios of Abut and Minagbag were transferred to the newly created town of Mallig. In 1961, those barrios were transferred to the newly created municipality of Quezon.

== Geography ==
Santo Tomas is a landlocked municipality situated in the northern portion of the province of Isabela. It is bounded to the west by Quezon, to the south by Delfin Albano, to the southeast by Tumauini, to the north and northeast by Cabagan and the Cagayan River.

Santo Tomas is situated 45.06 kilometres (28.00 mi) from the provincial capital Ilagan, and 473.98 kilometres (294.52 mi) from the country's capital city of Manila.

=== Barangays ===
Santo Tomas is politically subdivided into 27 barangays. Each barangay consists of puroks while some have sitios.

- Ammugauan
- Antagan
- Bagabag
- Bagutari
- Balelleng
- Barumbong
- Biga Occidental
- Biga Oriental
- Bubug
- Bolinao-Culalabo
- Calanigan Norte
- Calanigan Sur
- Calinaoan Centro
- Calinaoan Malasin
- Calinaoan Norte
- Cañogan Abajo Norte
- Cañogan Abajo Sur
- Cañogan Alto
- Centro
- Colunguan
- Malapagay
- San Rafael Abajo
- San Rafael Alto
- San Roque
- San Vicente
- Uauang-Tuliao
- Uauang-Galicia

Uauang-Galicia is now the population is 0 according in 2010 Census.

=== Climate ===
Climate data for Santo Tomas, Isabela
Month	Jan	Feb	Mar	Apr	May	Jun	Jul	Aug	Sep	Oct	Nov	Dec	Year
Mean daily maximum °C (°F)	29 (84)	30 (86)	32 (90)	35 (95)	35 (95)	35 (95)	34 (93)	33 (91)	32 (90)	31 (88)	30 (86)	28 (82)	32 (90)
Mean daily minimum °C (°F)	19 (66)	20 (68)	21 (70)	23 (73)	23 (73)	24 (75)	23 (73)	23 (73)	23 (73)	22 (72)	21 (70)	20 (68)	22 (71)
Average precipitation mm (inches)	31.2 (1.23)	23 (0.9)	27.7 (1.09)	28.1 (1.11)	113.5 (4.47)	141.4 (5.57)	176.4 (6.94)	236.6 (9.31)	224.9 (8.85)	247.7 (9.75)	222.9 (8.78)	178 (7.0)	1,651.4 (65)
Average rainy days	10	6	5	5	13	12	15	15	15	17	16	15	144
Source: World Weather Online (modeled/calculated data, not measured locally)

== Demographics ==
Population census of Santo Tomas

Year	Pop.	±% p.a.
1903	3,678	—
1960	11,460	+2.01%
1970	13,575	+1.71%
1975	14,239	+0.96%
1980	15,915	+2.25%
1990	18,063	+1.27%
1995	20,089	+2.01%

Year	Pop.	±% p.a.
2000	21,380	+1.34%
2007	22,172	+0.50%
2010	21,688	−0.80%
2015	23,005	+1.13%
2020	24,528	+1.36%
2024	25,997	+1.41%

Source: Philippine Statistics Authority

In the 2024 census, the population of Santo Tomas was 25,997 people, with a density of 400 inhabitants per square kilometre or 1,000 inhabitants per square mile.

== Economy ==
Poverty incidence of Santo Tomas (%)

Source: Philippine Statistics Authority

Farming is its primary source of income. The most widespread plantations were rice, corn and tobacco farms. Locals also raise livestock for extra income.

== Government ==
=== Local government ===
As a municipality in the Province of Isabela, government officials at the provincial and municipal levels are voted by the town. The provincial government has political jurisdiction over most local transactions of the municipal government.

The Municipality of Santo Tomas is governed by a mayor, designated as its local chief executive, and by a municipal council as its legislative body in accordance with the Local Government Code. The mayor, vice mayor, and the municipal councilors are elected directly in polls held every three years.

Barangays are also headed by elected officials: Barangay Captain, Barangay Council, whose members are called Barangay Councilors. The barangays have SK federation which represents the barangay, headed by SK chairperson and whose members are called SK councilors. All officials are also elected every three years.

=== Elected officials ===
Members of the Santo Tomas Municipal Council (2022-2025)
Position	Name
District Representative	Antonio T. Albano
Municipal Mayor	Leandro Antonio LA P. Talaue
Municipal Vice-Mayor	Antonio M. Talaue, Sr.
Municipal Councilors	Rona Lulu R. Talaue
Municipal Councilors	Eduardo T. Pua, Jr.
Municipal Councilors	Jose Amado S. Talaue
Municipal Councilors	Armando B. Lopez
Municipal Councilors	Eduardo S. Talaue, Jr.
Municipal Councilors	Jesus Canceran
Municipal Councilors	Marirose Angolluan
Municipal Councilors	Sonny P. Tallion

=== Congress representation ===
Santo Tomas, belonging to the first legislative district of the province of Isabela, currently represented by Hon. Antonio T. Albano.

== Education ==
The Schools Division of Isabela governs the town's public education system. The division office is a field office of the DepEd in Cagayan Valley region. The Sto. Tomas Schools District Office governs the public and private elementary and high schools throughout the municipality.

=== Primary and elementary schools ===
- Ammugauan Primary School
- Antagan Primary School
- Bagabag Primary School
- Bagutari Elementary School
- Balelleng Elementary School
- Barumbung Elementary School
- Bubug Elementary School
- Calanigan Elementary School
- Calinaoan Elementary School
- Cañogan Elementary School
- Colunguan Elementary School
- Malapagay Elementary School
- San Rafael Abajo Primary School
- San Rafael Alto Elementary School
- San Roque Elementary School
- Sto. Tomas Baptist Christian School
- Sto. Tomas Central School

=== Secondary schools ===
- Biga Integrated School
- Calanigan National High School
- Northern Isabela Academy
- San Vicente Integrated School
- Santo Tomas National High School
