= Consistent pricing process =

A consistent pricing process (CPP) is any representation of (frictionless) "prices" of assets in a market. It is a stochastic process in a filtered probability space $(\Omega,\mathcal{F},\{\mathcal{F}_t\}_{t=0}^T,P)$ such that at time $t$ the $i^{th}$ component can be thought of as a price for the $i^{th}$ asset.

Mathematically, a CPP $Z = (Z_t)_{t=0}^T$ in a market with d-assets is an adapted process in $\mathbb{R}^d$ if Z is a martingale with respect to the physical probability measure $P$, and if $Z_t \in K_t^+ \backslash \{0\}$ at all times $t$ such that $K_t$ is the solvency cone for the market at time $t$.

The CPP plays the role of an equivalent martingale measure in markets with transaction costs. In particular, there exists a 1-to-1 correspondence between the CPP $Z$ and the EMM $Q$.
