= Mid price =

In financial markets, the mid-price is the average price between a seller's ask price of a stock or other commodity and the best buyer bid price of that stock or commodity.

In some cases, the mid-price will be rounded up or down to the nearest "tick" (the nearest valid tradeable price on the exchange system) for convenience purposes, and therefore not be the exact average.

== Use in order execution ==
In electronic trading, the mid-price is often used as a reference price for orders that seek execution between the best bid and best offer. In U.S. equity markets, this midpoint is commonly calculated from the National Best Bid and Offer (NBBO). Some order types, such as midpoint peg orders, are non-displayed orders that are priced at the midpoint between the national best bid and national best offer.

Midpoint execution may provide price improvement relative to immediately trading at the bid or ask, because a buyer may execute below the best offer and a seller may execute above the best bid. Regulatory materials also refer to orders priced to execute at the midpoint of the NBBO or the best protected bid and offer, reflecting the use of midpoint pricing in order handling and market structure rules.

== See also ==
- Bid price
- Ask price
- Bid–offer spread
