= Delfin Albano =

Municipality in Isabela, Philippines

- Municipality
- Municipality of Delfin Albano
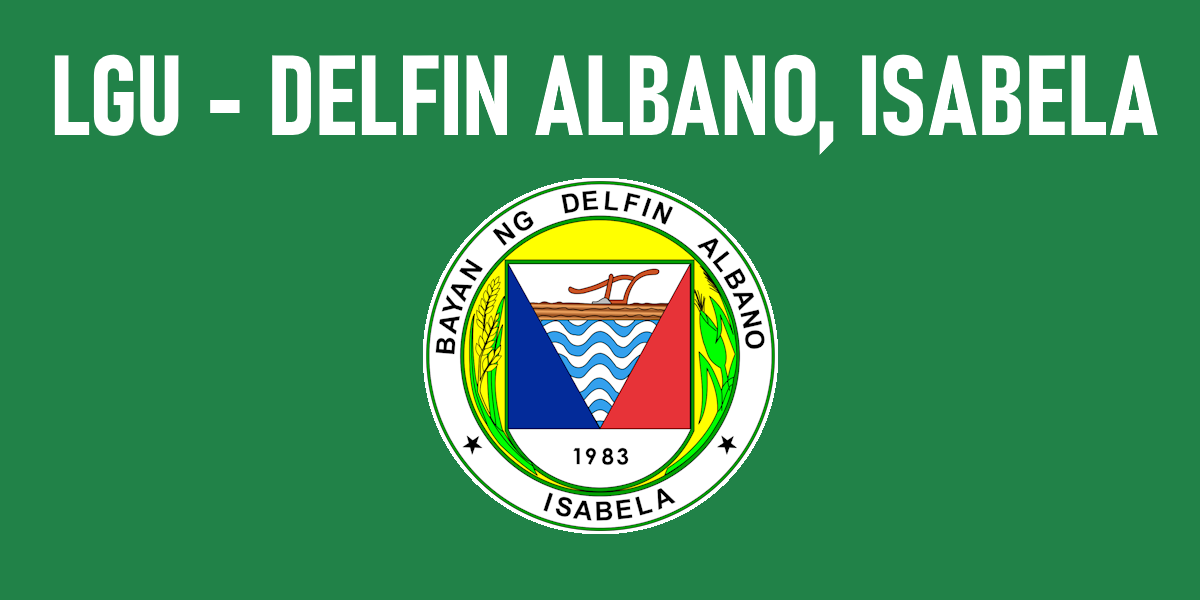
- Flag Seal
- Nickname: Magsaysay
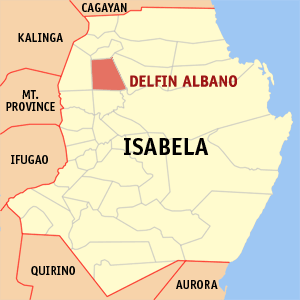
- Map of Isabela with Delfin Albano highlighted
- Interactive map of Delfin Albano
- Location within the Philippines
- Coordinates: 17°19′N 121°47′E
- Country: Philippines
- Region: Cagayan Valley
- Province: Isabela
- District: 1st district
- Founded: June 22, 1957
- Renamed: October 1, 1983
- Named for: Cong. Delfin Albano
- Barangays: 29 (see Barangays)

Government
  - Type: Sangguniang Bayan
  - Mayor: Arnold Edward P. Co
  - Vice Mayor: Thomas A. Pua, Jr.
  - Representative: Antonio T. Albano
  - Electorate: 18,640 voters (2025)

Area
  - Total: 189.00 km^{2} (72.97 sq mi)
- Elevation: 35 m (115 ft)
- Highest elevation: 64 m (210 ft)
- Lowest elevation: 21 m (69 ft)

Population (2024 census)
  - Total: 30,860
  - Density: 163.3/km^{2} (422.9/sq mi)
  - Households: 7,829

Economy
  - Income class: 1st municipal income class
  - Poverty incidence: 10.89% (2023)
  - Revenue: ₱ 216.5 million (2024)
  - Assets: ₱ 521.3 million (2024)
  - Expenditure: ₱ 194.1 million (2024)
  - Liabilities: ₱ 101.5 million (2024)

Service provider
  - Electricity: Isabela 2 Electric Cooperative (ISELCO 2)
- Time zone: UTC+8 (PST)
- ZIP code: 3326
- PSGC: 0203118000
- IDD : area code: +63 (0)78
- Native languages: Ibanag; Ilocano; Tagalog
- Website: lgudelfinalbano.org

Delfin Albano, officially the Municipality of Delfin Albano (Ibanag: Ili nat Delfin Albano; Ilocano: Ili ti Delfin Albano; Tagalog: Bayan ng Delfin Albano), is a municipality in the province of Isabela, Philippines. According to the 2024 census, it has a population of 30,860 people.

The municipality was formerly known as Magsaysay until it was named after the former congressman, Delfin Albano.

== Etymology ==
On November 14, 1982, by virtue of Batas Pambansa Blg. 291, the municipality was renamed to its current name in honor of its native legislator, Congressman Delfin Albano.

== History ==
On June 22, 1957, by virtue of Republic Act No. 2009, the barrios of San Antonio, San Juan, Ragan Sur, Ragan Norte, Ragan Almacen, San Jose (Bulo), San Patricio, Quibal, San Andres (Lattu), Calinawan Sur, Bayabo, Santor, Santo Rosario, Andarayan, Aneg, San Isidro, Maui, San Roque, Carmencita, Aga, Villa Pareda, Villaluz, San Pedro, Concepcion, San Macario and San Nicolas and the sitios of Turod, Paco, Calamagui and Kim-malabasa, were separated from the municipality of Tumauini to form the municipality of Magsaysay, in honor of President Ramon Magsaysay who died two months prior.

In 1982, a bill seeking to change the name of the municipality from Magsaysay to Delfin Albano was filed in the Interim Batasang Pambansa. This was in honor of the late Delfin Albano who authored the Republic Act No. 2009 which created the municipality of Magsaysay. On November 14, 1982, Batasang Pambansa No. 291 was approved. The municipality formally celebrated and installed the name of Delfin Albano on October 1, 1983.

== Geography ==
Delfin Albano is located at 38 kilometres (24 mi) northwest of Ilagan City, the capital city of the province. The town is bounded to the north by Santo Tomas, to the east by the Cagayan River shared with Tumauini, to the west by Quezon and Mallig, and to the south by Quirino, Ilagan City and the Mallig River.

Delfin Albano is situated 30.77 kilometres (19.12 mi) from the provincial capital Ilagan, and 455.50 kilometres (283.03 mi) north of the country's capital Manila

=== Barangays ===
Delfin Albano is politically subdivided into twenty nine (30) barangays. Each barangay consists of puroks while some have sitios.

- Aga
- Andarayan
- Aneg
- Bayabo
- Calinaoan Sur
- Capitol
- Carmencita
- Concepcion
- El Paso
- Maui
- Quibal
- Ragan Almacen
- Ragan Norte
- Ragan Sur (Poblacion)
- Rizal
- San Andres
- San Antonio
- San Isidro
- San Jose
- San Juan
- San Macario
- San Nicolas (Fusi)
- San Patricio
- San Roque
- Santo Rosario
- Santor
- Villa Luz
- Villa Pereda
- Visitacion
- Caloocan

=== Climate ===
Climate data for Delfin Albano, Isabela
Month	Jan	Feb	Mar	Apr	May	Jun	Jul	Aug	Sep	Oct	Nov	Dec	Year
Mean daily maximum °C (°F)	29 (84)	30 (86)	32 (90)	35 (95)	35 (95)	35 (95)	34 (93)	33 (91)	32 (90)	31 (88)	30 (86)	28 (82)	32 (90)
Mean daily minimum °C (°F)	19 (66)	20 (68)	21 (70)	23 (73)	23 (73)	24 (75)	23 (73)	23 (73)	23 (73)	22 (72)	21 (70)	20 (68)	22 (71)
Average precipitation mm (inches)	31.2 (1.23)	23 (0.9)	27.7 (1.09)	28.1 (1.11)	113.5 (4.47)	141.4 (5.57)	176.4 (6.94)	236.6 (9.31)	224.9 (8.85)	247.7 (9.75)	222.9 (8.78)	178 (7.0)	1,651.4 (65)
Average rainy days	10	6	5	5	13	12	15	15	15	17	16	15	144
Source: World Weather Online (modeled/calculated data, not measured locally)

=== Land area and land use ===
The town occupies a total land area of 18,900 hectares, which is further subdivided to twenty nine (29) barangays. The total land area contains varied land use, which were developed in response to population and economic growth of the total land area, to wit: agriculture (59.04%), built-up areas (2.74%), forest (4.74%), open grass lands (30.15), and road and water bodies (3.33%).

== Demographics ==
Population census of Delfin Albano

Year	Pop.	±% p.a.
1960	10,742	—
1970	13,905	+2.61%
1975	15,585	+2.31%
1980	17,725	+2.61%
1990	20,410	+1.42%
1995	21,811	+1.25%

Year	Pop.	±% p.a.
2000	23,619	+1.72%
2007	24,899	+0.73%
2010	25,422	+0.76%
2015	26,614	+0.88%
2020	29,928	+2.50%
2024	30,860	+0.74%

Source: Philippine Statistics Authority

In the 2024 census, the population of Delfin Albano was 30,860 people, with a density of 160 inhabitants per square kilometre or 410 inhabitants per square mile.

== Economy ==
Poverty incidence of Delfin Albano (%)

Source: Philippine Statistics Authority

== Government ==
=== Local government ===
As a municipality in the Province of Isabela, government officials at the provincial and municipal levels are voted by the town. The provincial government has political jurisdiction over most local transactions of the municipal government.

The municipality of Delfin Albano is governed by a mayor, designated as its local chief executive, and by a municipal council as its legislative body in accordance with the Local Government Code. The mayor, vice mayor, and the municipal councilors are elected directly by the people through an election held every three years.

Barangays are also headed by elected officials: Barangay Captain, Barangay Council, whose members are called Barangay Councilors. The barangays have SK federation which represents the barangay, headed by SK chairperson and whose members are called SK councilors. All officials are also elected every three years.

=== Elected officials ===
Members of the Municipal Council (2022-2025)
Position	Name
Congressman	Antonio T. Albano
Mayor	Arnold Edward P. Co
Vice-Mayor	Thomas A. Pua Jr.
Councilors	Maximo S. Caliguiran, Jr.
Councilors	Alex M. Macarilay Jr.
Councilors	Anthony L. Albano
Councilors	Elli John G. Cañero
Councilors	Jay B. Caliguiran
Councilors	Edwin B. Badua
Councilors	Joel A. Talamayan
Councilors	Clemente Dumlao, Jr.

=== Congress representation ===
Delfin Albano, as a municipality, belongs to the first legislative district of the province of Isabela. The current representative is Hon. Antonio T. Albano.

== Education ==
The Schools Division of Isabela governs the town's public education system. The division office is a field office of the DepEd in Cagayan Valley region. The Delfin Albano Schools District Office governs all educational institutions within the municipality. It oversees the management and operations of all private and public, from primary to secondary schools.

=== Primary and elementary schools ===
- Aga Elementary School
- Andarayan Elementary School
- Aneg Elementary School
- Bin-i Nursery/Kindergarten School
- Calaocan Multigrade School
- Capitol Elementary School
- Carmencita Elementary School
- Church of Christ Kindergarten School
- Delfin Albano Adventist Elementary School
- Delfin Albano Central School
- Gideon Joy Nursery-Kindergarten School
- Jimenez Multigrade School
- Maui Elementary School
- MLG Christian Learning Center
- Ragan Elementary School
- San Andres Elementary School
- San Antonio Elementary School
- San Isidro Multigrade
- San Juan Elementary School
- San Macario Multigrade
- San Nicolas Elementary School
- San Ramon Elementary School
- Santor Primary School
- Sta. Cruz Multigrade
- Villa TJ Multigrade School of Carmencita

=== Secondary schools ===
- Aneg National High School
- Delfin Albano (Magsaysay) Stand Alone Senior High School
- Ragan Sur National High School
- San Antonio National High School
- Tomas Pua Sr. Integrated School

== See also ==
- List of renamed cities and municipalities in the Philippines
