= Underwriting spread =

Term used in finance

The underwriting spread is the difference between the amount paid by the underwriting group in a new issue of securities and the price at which securities are offered for sale to the public. It is the underwriter's gross profit margin, usually expressed in points per unit of sale (bond or stock). Spreads may vary widely and are influenced by the underwriter's expectation of market demand for the securities offered for sale, interest rates, and so on.

Components of an underwriting spread in an initial public offering (IPO) typically include the following (on a per share basis): Manager's fee, Underwriting fee—earned by members of the syndicate, and the Concession—earned by the broker-dealer selling the shares. The Manager would be entitled to the entire underwriting spread. A member of the syndicate is entitled to the underwriting fee and the concession. A broker dealer who is not a member of the syndicate but sells shares would receive only the concession, while the member of the syndicate who provided the shares to that broker dealer would retain the underwriting fee.
