= Tumauini =

Municipality in Isabela, Philippines

- Municipality
- Municipality of Tumauini
- Tumauini Church Tumauini Old Municipal Hall Maharlika Highway along Tumauini

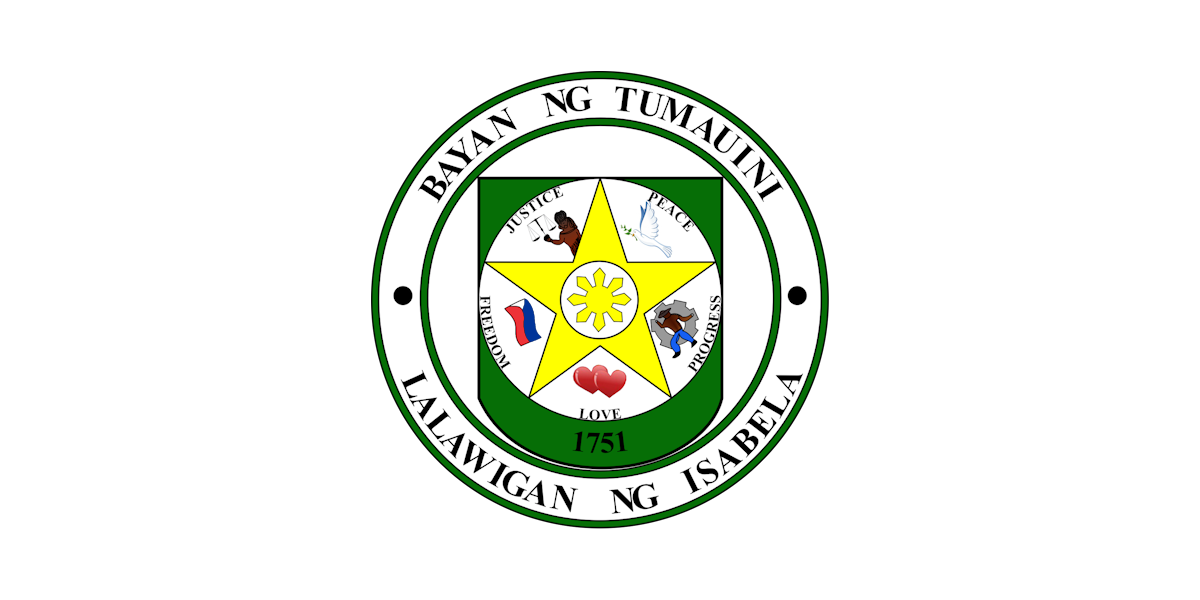
- Flag Seal

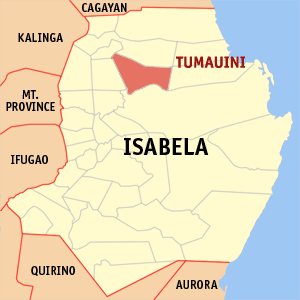
- Map of Isabela with Tumauini highlighted
- Interactive map of Tumauini
- Location within the Philippines
- Coordinates: 17°16′N 121°48′E
- Country: Philippines
- Region: Cagayan Valley
- Province: Isabela
- District: 1st district
- Founded: 1751
- Barangays: 46 (see Barangays)

Government
  - Type: Sangguniang Bayan
  - Mayor: Venus T. Bautista
  - Vice Mayor: Christopher B. Uy
  - Representative: Antonio T. Albano
  - Municipal Council: Members: Sharina Lu T. Bautista; Roberto R. Guiyab; Lluigi Anthonel L. Gardon; Romeo B. Ugaddan; Marvin Francis M. de Alban; Rogelio C. Dammog Jr.; Ferdinand N. Taccad; Rostum B. Binalay
  - Electorate: 47,634 voters (2025)

Area
  - Total: 467.30 km^{2} (180.43 sq mi)
- Elevation: 42 m (138 ft)
- Highest elevation: 126 m (413 ft)
- Lowest elevation: 22 m (72 ft)

Population (2024 census)
  - Total: 77,153
  - Density: 165.10/km^{2} (427.62/sq mi)
  - Households: 16,825

Economy
  - Income class: 1st municipal income class
  - Poverty incidence: 14.82% (2023)
  - Revenue: ₱ 436.7 million (2024)
  - Assets: ₱ 2,117 million (2024)
  - Expenditure: ₱ 419.8 million (2024)
  - Liabilities: ₱ 341.4 million (2024)

Service provider
  - Electricity: Isabela 2 Electric Cooperative (ISELCO 2)
- Time zone: UTC+8 (PST)
- ZIP code: 3325
- PSGC: 0203137000
- IDD : area code: +63 (0)78
- Native languages: Ibanag; Ilocano; Tagalog
- Website: tumauini-isabela.gov.ph

Tumauini [ˌtumaˈwini], officially the Municipality of Tumauini (Ibanag: Ili nat Tumauini; Ilocano: Ili ti Tumauini; Tagalog: Bayan ng Tumauini), is a municipality in the province of Isabela, Philippines. According to the 2024 census, it has a population of 77,153 people.

== Etymology ==
The name of Tumauini originated from the name of the big trees found in the Poblacion called "Mauini". It is said that when some Spaniards wanted to know the name of the trees, they asked a native, saying, " 'Como se llama el grande lenia? Sabes tu?'" The native, not knowing what the Spaniards said, picked the last word he heard and answered "Tumauini".

== History ==
Tumauini was officially established as a Spanish mission in 1704, with civil administration frequently shifting between the neighboring towns of Cabagan and Ilagan. It became a town in its own right on 10 May 1751.

In 1952, the barrios of Barucbuc, Siempre Viva, Bimmonton, Pasurgong, Manga, and Settlement No. 1 were transferred to the newly created town of Mallig.

In 1957, the barrios of San Antonio, San Juan, Ragan Sur, Ragan Norte, Ragan Almacen, San Jose (Bulo), San Patricio, Quibal, San Andres (Lattu), Calinawan Sur, Bayabo, Santor, Santo Rosario, Andarayan, Aneg, San Isidro, Mawi, San Roque, Carmencita, Aga, Villa Pareda, Villaluz, San Pedro, Concepcion, Sammabario and San Nicolas and the sitios of Turod, Paco, Calamagui and Kim-malabasa, were separated from the municipality of Tumauini to form the town of Magsaysay.

Notably, Camp Samal used to be a guerrilla camp during World War II, and SAMAL derives from SA, meaning Sadornas, and MAL from Malana.

== Geography ==
Tumauini is located in the northern portion of the province of Isabela. Its land area is 46,730 hectares (115,500 acres) or 5.62% of the total land area of Isabela. It is bounded on the north by the municipality of Cabagan; on the east by the municipality of Divilacan, on the south by the City of Ilagan, the capital of Isabela; and on the west by the Cagayan River and the municipality of Delfin Albano.

Tumauini is situated 24.22 kilometres (15.05 mi) from the provincial capital Ilagan, and 452.74 kilometres (281.32 mi) from the country's capital city of Manila.

=== Barangays ===
Tumauini has politically subdivided into 46 barangays. Each barangay consists of puroks while some have sitios.

Four of the barangays compose the center of the town, whereas the other 42 are in the outlying areas. Some of them are even several kilometers away from the center of the municipality. The most populous are San Pedro, Antagan I, and Lanna.

- Annafunan
- Antagan I
- Antagan II
- Arcon
- Balug
- Banig
- Bantug
- Barangay District 1 (Poblacion)
- Barangay District 2 (Poblacion)
- Barangay District 3 (Poblacion)
- Barangay District 4 (Poblacion)
- Bayabo East
- Caligayan
- Camasi
- Carpentero
- Compania
- Cumabao
- Fermeldy (Hacienda San Francisco)
- Fugu Abajo
- Fugu Norte
- Fugu Sur
- Lalauanan
- Lanna
- Lapogan
- Lingaling (Poblacion)
- Liwanag
- Malamag East
- Malamag West
- Maligaya (Poblacion)
- Minanga
- Moldero
- Namnama
- Paragu
- Pilitan
- San Mateo
- San Pedro
- San Vicente
- Santa
- Santa Catalina
- Santa Visitación (Maggayu)
- Santo Niño
- Sinippil
- Sisim Abajo
- Sisim Alto
- Tunggui
- Ugad

=== Climate ===
Climate data for Tumauini, Isabela
Month	Jan	Feb	Mar	Apr	May	Jun	Jul	Aug	Sep	Oct	Nov	Dec	Year
Mean daily maximum °C (°F)	29 (84)	30 (86)	32 (90)	35 (95)	35 (95)	35 (95)	34 (93)	33 (91)	32 (90)	31 (88)	30 (86)	28 (82)	32 (90)
Mean daily minimum °C (°F)	19 (66)	20 (68)	21 (70)	23 (73)	23 (73)	24 (75)	23 (73)	23 (73)	23 (73)	22 (72)	21 (70)	20 (68)	22 (71)
Average precipitation mm (inches)	31.2 (1.23)	23 (0.9)	27.7 (1.09)	28.1 (1.11)	113.5 (4.47)	141.4 (5.57)	176.4 (6.94)	236.6 (9.31)	224.9 (8.85)	247.7 (9.75)	222.9 (8.78)	178 (7.0)	1,651.4 (65)
Average rainy days	10	6	5	5	13	14	15	15	15	17	16	15	146
Source: World Weather Online

== Demographics ==
Population census of Tumauini
Year	Pop.	±% p.a.
1903	4,890	—
1918	7,147	+2.56%
1939	14,343	+3.37%
1948	19,190	+3.29%
1960	16,606	−1.20%
1970	23,427	+3.50%
1975	27,669	+3.39%
1980	31,967	+2.93%
1990	40,664	+2.44%
1995	45,551	+2.15%
2000	50,256	+2.13%
2007	55,041	+1.26%
2010	58,463	+2.22%
2015	67,650	+2.82%
2020	70,743	+0.95%
2024	77,153	+2.10%
Source: Philippine Statistics Authority

In the 2024 census, the population of Tumauini was 77,153 people, with a density of 170 inhabitants per square kilometre or 440 inhabitants per square mile.

== Economy ==
Poverty incidence of Tumauini (%)

Source: Philippine Statistics Authority

Over the past years, the town's economy has dramatically shifted from stagnant to a fast-moving basis. Aside from agriculture being the main backbone of the town's economy, commerce and trade also became the second economic-based income of the town and its residents with the opening of numerous business establishments, hotels, and financial institutions that generated many opportunities and more employment for its residents.

=== Retail industry ===
In 2015, the retail giant SM Prime established its first Savemore Market branch along the National Highway in the town. This was closely followed by the opening of the first Puregold Price Club store, a popular retail chain, in the same year. Two years later, in 2017, the well-known multinational fast-food chain Jollibee opened its first branch in the area, providing residents with a wider variety of dining options. The opening of Jollibee was just the beginning, as more fast-food chains like McDonald's and Mang Inasal have plans to establish branches in the town's first mall, Xentro Mall.

On June 28, 2021, the municipal government inaugurated the newly built Tumauini Public Market. The multi-million modern market complex is composed of eight buildings located along the National Highway and serves as the major trading hub of the town and nearby municipalities.

=== Banking and finance services ===
Banking institutions like BDO Unibank, Development Bank of the Philippines, Producers Bank, FICO Bank, and other smaller financial institutions put up their branches in the town which is a good indication that the town is gearing towards rapid commercialization. As of 31 December 2021, Tumauini has a total of 10 banks with a total volume of bank deposits of Php 1.5 billion.

== Government ==
=== Local government ===
As a municipality in the province of Isabela, government officials at the provincial and municipal levels are elected by the town. The provincial government has political jurisdiction over most local transactions of the municipal government.

The Municipality of Tumauini is governed by a mayor, designated as its local chief executive, and by a municipal council as its legislative body in accordance with the Local Government Code. The mayor, vice mayor, and the municipal councilors are elected directly in polls held every three years.

Barangays are also headed by elected officials: Barangay Captain, Barangay Council, whose members are called Barangay Councilors. The barangays have an SK federation, which represents the barangay, headed by the SK chairperson and whose members are called SK councilors. All officials are also elected every three years.

=== Elected officials ===
Members of the Tumauini Municipal Council (2022–2025)
Position	Name of official
District Representative (1st Legislative District, Isabela)	Rep. Antonio T. Albano
Municipal Mayor	Venus T. Bautista
Municipal Vice Mayor	Christopher B. Uy
Municipal Councilors	Sharina Lu B. Medrano
Municipal Councilors	Roberto R. Guiyab
Municipal Councilors	Lluigi Anthonel L. Gardon
Municipal Councilors	Romeo B. Ugaddan
Municipal Councilors	Marvin Francis De Alban
Municipal Councilors	Rogelio C. Dammog Jr.
Municipal Councilors	Ferdinand Taccad
Municipal Councilors	Rostum B. Binalay

=== Congress representation ===
Tumauini, belonging to the first legislative district of the province of Isabela, is currently represented by Antonio T. Albano.

=== Government facilities ===
On June 28, 2021, the municipal government inaugurated the new Tumauini Municipal Hall along National Highway in Barangay San Pedro. The newly built multi-million peso structure is designed to accommodate government functions, delivery of basic services for the people, and as a facility for various civic and cultural activities.

On May 10, 2023, the municipal government inaugurated the new Tumauini Legislative Building and Tumauini Municipal Police Station. These newly built modern facilities were erected to accommodate legislative functions for the members and staff of the municipal council and give a bigger office space for the Philippine National Police to help them perform their duties and responsibilities in maintaining the peace and order within the town's territorial boundaries.

On February 23, 2024, the newly completed multi-million infrastructure projects in Tumauini were inaugurated. The government facilities include the P225 million worth Rudy B. Albano Astrodome and the P16 million worth legislative building of the Local Government. Unit of Tumauini. The newly built astrodome is the largest of its kind in the Cagayan Valley Region, with an area of 4,140 square meters, with 14 layers of concrete bleachers located beside the municipal hall along Maharlika Highway in Barangay San Pedro.

=== Judiciary ===
On August 29, 2025, the Philippine Congress enacted Republic Act No. 12245, establishing a Regional Trial Court (RTC) in the municipality of Tumauini under the Second Judicial Region. The branch is intended to address the increasing volume of cases in the province and to improve access to judicial services for residents of northern Isabela.

== Healthcare ==
Tumauini has its own Rural Health Unit (RHU) located in barangay Lingaling that caters mostly to residents from far-flung areas of the town who opt to avail the services provided by the Municipal Health Office (MHO). Tumauini Community Hospital (TCH) is a government owned and operated Level-I hospital that was originally authorized to cater at least 15-bed maximum capacity. The facility also serves as the primary health care facility of the town and neighboring municipalities. On October 7, 2022, the Municipal Government of Tumauini inaugurated the town's first Animal Bite Center located inside the Tumauini Community Hospital.

The St. Matthias Medical Center of Isabela, Inc. is a privately owned Level-II hospital located along Maharlika Highway in Barangay Lalauanan. On March 8, 2024, the hospital officially had its soft launch to cater to a wide range of healthcare services, which include Ancillary and Diagnostic services, Clinical services, and Outpatient services.

== Education ==
The Schools Division of Isabela governs the town's public education system. The division office is a field office of the DepEd in Cagayan Valley region. two school district offices govern both public and private elementary and high schools throughout the municipality, namely: Tumauini North District, and Tumauini South District.

=== Primary and elementary schools ===
- Advance Montessori Education Center of Isabela
- Antagan 1st Elementary School - Main
- Antagan 1st Elementary School - Sitio Magoli Annex
- Antagan 2nd Elementary School
- Arcon-Maligaya Elementary School
- Balug Elementary School
- Bantug Elementary School
- Caligayan Elementary School
- Camasi Elementary School
- Come and See Christian School
- Dalayya Elementary School
- Divisoria Elementary School
- Dy-Abra Elementary School
- Fugu Abajo Elementary School
- Fugu Elementary School
- Lalauanan-Sto. Niño Elementary School
- Lanna Elementary School
- Liwanag Elementary School
- Malamag Elementary School
- Manuel R. Moldero Sr. Elementary School
- Namnama Elementary School
- Pallacot Elementary School
- Paragu Elementary School
- Pilitan Elementary School
- San Mateo Elementary School
- San Vicente Elementary School
- Santa Elementary School
- Sisim-Minanga Elementary School
- Sta. Catalina Elementary School
- Tumauini Adventist Elementary
- Tumauini Baptist School
- Tumauini North Central School
- Tumauini South Central School
- Tumauini United Methodist Christian School
- Tumauini West Central School
- Ugad Elementary School

=== Secondary schools ===
- Advance Montessori Education Center of Isabela
- Antagan National High School
- Bayabo East Integrated School
- Josefina Albano National High School
- Lalauanan National High School
- Lanna National High School
- Lapogan Integrated School
- Regional Science High School for Region II
- Fermeldy National High School
- School of Saint Matthias
- Tumauini National High School

=== Higher educational institution ===
- HGBaquiran College

== Tourism ==
The town's historical landmarks include the Tumauini Church. Built-in the 1780s by the Dominicans, the church has an unusual cylindrical bell tower made of bricks. Also in the town is the Camp Samal Resort and Leisure Park, which is known as a semi-Tagaytay because of its high location, where one can view the entire town in the west, south, and north, and the Cordillera Sierra Madre in the east.

In April 2022, the Tumauini Watershed Natural Park was inaugurated in the town of Tumauini as a sustainable entrepreneurial business that sits within the said protected area.

=== San Matias Parish Church ===
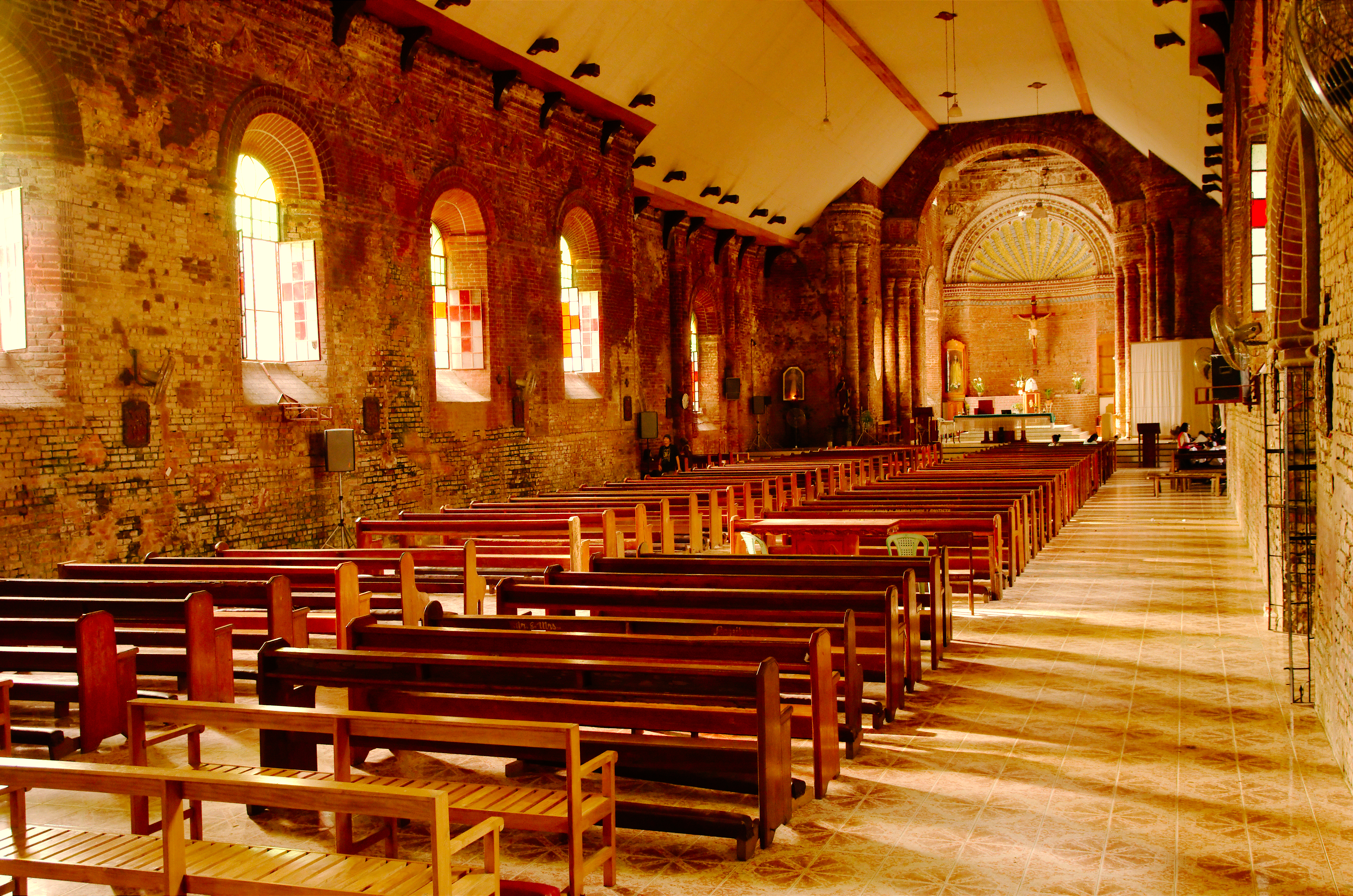
San Matias Church Interior

The Parish Church of San Matias was built in the 1780s by the Dominicans. It is the best-preserved church ensemble in Isabela, although its Convento is in ruins. It has a cylindrical, confectionery-like bell tower (a later addition). In the Convento vaulted ceiling, impressions may still be seen of the mats that were used as forms to mold wet plaster during construction. A low, undulating brick wall circumscribes the front garden.

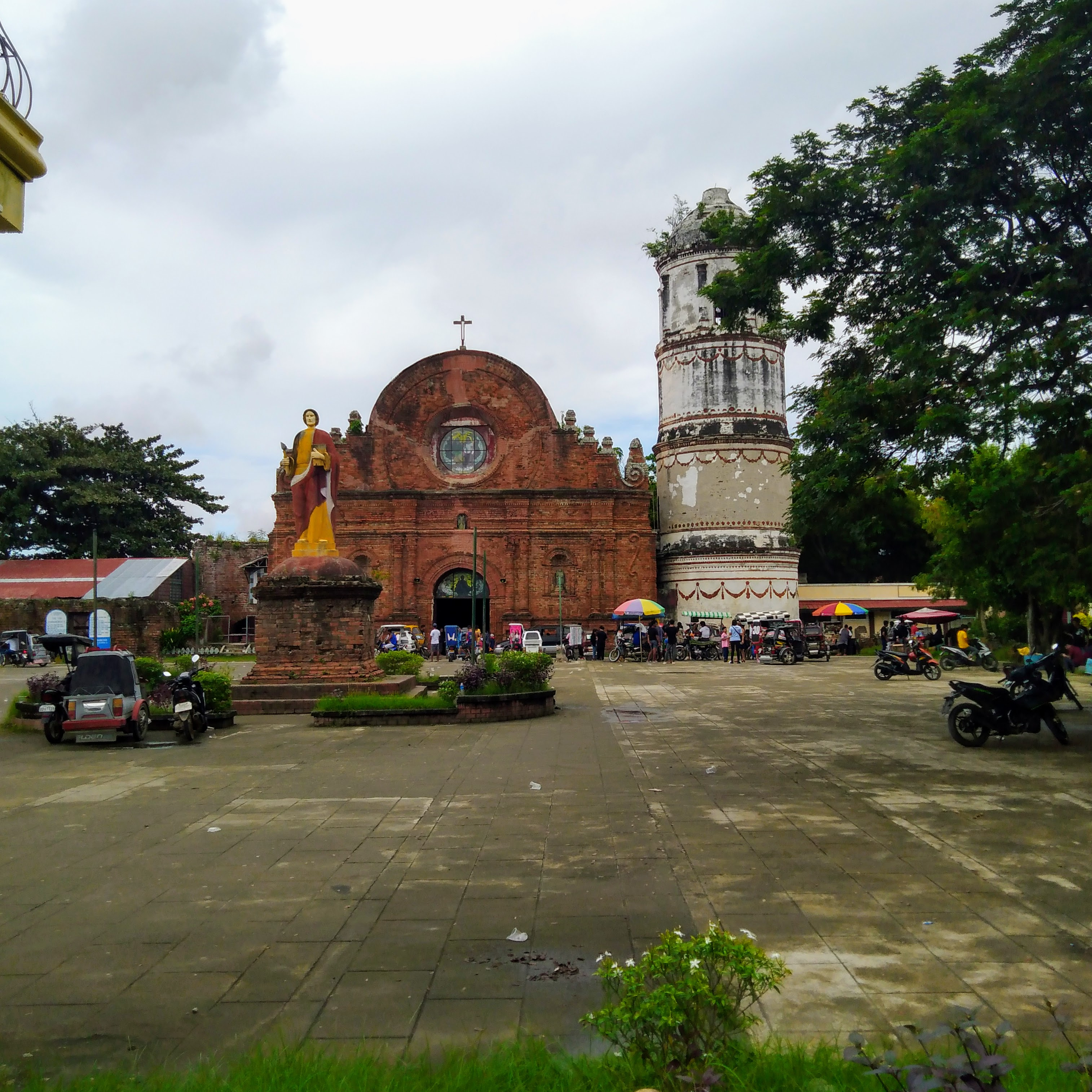
San Matias Church Exterior

The building of the church from light materials by Francisco Nunez O. P. began in 1707 after Tumauini was separated from Cabagan and became a regular parish in 1751. The Roman Catholic Church was erected by the Dominicans in 1753. They were made of bricks and coral stones with a cylindrical bell tower, the only of its kind in the Philippines which was constructed by Fr. Domingo Forto in 1793 and completed in 1805, became the capital of Isabela for some time in the 1880s. The Church was partly damaged during World War II, but was repaired to its original form by the parishioners of Tumauini.

The church's architectural design bears traces of Chinese artistry, which may confirm the belief that long before the Spaniards came to the Philippines, the Chinese had settled in the coastal towns of Northern Luzon.

By virtue of Presidential Decree # 260, 11 August 1973, as amended by Executive Order No. 357, 14 January 1974, and No. 1505, 11 June 1978, the Church of Tumauini was declared a National Historic Landmark on February 24, 1989.

The Tumauini Church is currently on the tentative list for UNESCO World Heritage Sites under the Baroque Churches of the Philippines (Extension). A proposal has been suggested by scholars to make a separate UNESCO inclusion for the Old Centre of Tumauini, which includes the Tumauini Church. The same would be done for other churches listed in UNESCO's tentative sites, where each town plaza and surrounding heritage buildings would be added. No government agency has yet taken action on the proposal.

=== Camp Samal ===
The historic Camp Samal was the site of the National Jamboree in 1977 and is the home of the Boy Scouts of the Philippines. It is located at the eastern outskirts of the Spanish – built town of Tumauini, on a 23.5 hectares (58 acres) of the elevated mass of rolling hills 500 feet above sea level. It is endowed with natural springs, evergreen grasses, trees, and shrubs. It overlooks the Cagayan River, the Pinacanauan River, the town of Tumauini itself, the municipality of Delfin Albano, and the Sierra Mountain ranges.

Its name was derived from the first syllable of the surnames of the spouses, Ricardo C. Sadornas and Purificacion Malana, who donated the camp to the Boy Scouts of the Philippines in 1954. After the holding of the 1977 National Jamboree, the camp was restored under the administration of Mayor Arnold S. Bautista in 2001, who drew out the support of the government and private sectors for its restoration and development. It is still the favorite destination of the Boy Scouts and Girl Scouts of the Philippines for their annual district and provincial encampments. It hosted the 5th Northeastern Luzon Regional and Ilocos Region Invitational Jamboree of the Boy Scouts of the Philippines held on November 25 – 30, 2004, with a total of 5,281 participants.

=== Mangi Festival ===
The patronal town fiesta is in honor of St. Mathias and the promotion of Tumauini as a source of corn and its by-products.

One of the legacies of the Spanish colonial era in town is corn (maize). It was one of the plants that came aboard the galleons and became one of the primary crops of the Philippines. The late National Artist for Dance, Ramon Obusan, traced the origins of a traditional dance inspired by the crop to Tumauini.

=== Magoli River ===
Antagan 1st contains the Magoli River, which provides an ample source of water for irrigation, fields, and households.

One of the features of the river is the Blue Lagoon. The locals have named two large rocks in the center of the river "Kambal na Bato" (twin stones), which are also a tourist attraction because of their unique and unusual appearance.

The river is also a popular spot for swimming, fishing, and boating.

== Media ==
- 102.5 MHz DZJD Happy Radio Isabela
- FUSASIS Media Production
