= Ask price =

Price a seller is willing to accept

Ask price (also called offer price, offer, selling price, asking price, or simply ask) is the price a seller is willing to accept.

The seller may qualify the stated asking price as firm or negotiable. Firm means the seller is implying that the price is fixed and will not change.

In bid and ask, the term ask price is used in contrast to the term bid price. The difference between the bid price and the ask price is called the spread.

== Stock exchange ==
In the context of stock trading on a stock exchange, the ask price is the lowest price a seller of a stock is willing to accept for a share of that given stock. For over-the-counter stocks, the asking price is the best-quoted price at which a market maker is willing to sell a stock.

== Mutual funds ==
For mutual funds, the asking price is the net asset value plus any sales charges. It is also called asked price or offering price or ask.

== Commodities ==
The ask price is the lowest price a seller of a commodity is willing to accept for that commodity.

== Auctions ==
In an auction, a reserve is the minimum price that a seller is willing to accept for a lot. Some lots are offered without a reserve.

== See also ==
- Bid price
- Bid–offer spread
