= Bid price =

Highest price a buyer is willing to pay for a product

A bid price is the highest price that a buyer (i.e., bidder) is willing to pay for some goods. It is usually referred to simply as the "bid". In bid and ask, the bid price stands in contrast to the ask price or "offer", and the difference between the two is called the bid–ask spread. An unsolicited bid or purchase offer is when a person or company receives a bid even though they are not looking to sell.

== Bidding war ==
A bidding war is said to occur when a large number of competing bids are placed in rapid succession by two or more entities, especially when the price paid is much greater than the ask price, or greater than the first bid in the case of unsolicited bidding.

In other words, a bidding war is a situation where two or more buyers are interested in an item (such as a house or a business) that they make increasingly higher-priced offers in attempts to outbid others and win the ownership of the item.

In real estate, a potential buyer can increase their bid in a number of different ways. Some common ways a bidder can increase their bid such as offering a higher purchase price, reduce the number of contingencies, pay with cash or even write a letter to appeal to the seller. These are all strategies that are proven to increase the odds of the buyer winning the bidding war.

== In the markets ==
In the context of stock trading on a stock exchange, the bid price is the highest price a buyer of a stock is willing to pay for a share of that given stock. The bid price displayed in most quote services is the highest bid price in the market. The ask or offer price on the other hand is the lowest price a seller of a particular stock is willing to sell a share of that given stock. The ask or offer price displayed is the lowest ask/offer price in the stock market.

The bid price is almost always lower than the ask price.

== See also ==
- Ask price
- Bidding fee auction
- Call for bids
- Unique bid auction
