= Frictionless market =

In economic theory a frictionless market is a financial market without transaction costs. Friction is a type of market incompleteness. Every complete market is frictionless, but the converse does not hold. In a frictionless market the solvency cone is the halfspace normal to the unique price vector. The Black–Scholes model assumes a frictionless market.
