= Inno Dy =

Filipino politician (born 1991)

Faustino Dy V
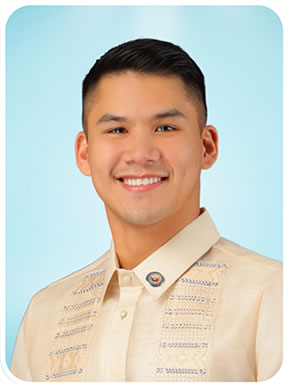
- Official portrait, 2022

Mayor of Echague
- Incumbent
- Assumed office June 30, 2025
- Vice Mayor: Allan Tupong
- Preceded by: Francis Faustino A. Dy

Member of the Philippine House of Representatives from Isabela's 6th district
- In office June 30, 2019 – June 30, 2025
- Preceded by: District established
- Succeeded by: Bojie Dy

National President of Liga ng mga Barangay
- In office 2018–2019
- Preceded by: Edmund Abesamis Jr.
- Succeeded by: Eden Chua Pineda

Barangay Captain of San Fabian, Echague
- In office June 30, 2018 – June 30, 2019

Personal details
- Born: September 13, 1991 (age 34)
- Party: Lakas (2022–present)
- Other party: PDP–Laban (2018–2022)
- Spouse: Alyssa Sheena Tan (m. 2021)
- Relations: Dy family
- Children: 3
- Relatives: Benjamin Dy (uncle); Ian Paul Dy (first cousin); Mike Dy III (first cousin)

Faustino "Inno" Arcega Dy V (born September 13, 1991) is a Filipino politician who has served as Mayor of Echague since 2025. He represented the 6th District of Isabela at the House of Representatives of the Philippines from 2019 to 2025. He previously served as the national president of Liga ng mga Barangay from 2018 to 2019. He is the son of House Speaker Bojie Dy and the husband of Santiago City Mayor Alyssa Sheena Tan.
