= Cauayan City National High School =

Public school in Isabela, Philippines

Cauayan City National High School - Main

Location
- P. Albano Street, Turayong; 2 - Cagayan Valley; Cauayan, Isabela; Philippines
- Coordinates: 16.9387°N 121.7773°E

Information
- Former name: Cauayan National High School
- Type: Public Secondary School
- Motto: Aim High City High
- Established: 1997
- Principal: Eddie C. Reyes, Secondary School Principal II
- Campus: Cauayan
- Color(s): Blue, Yellow
- Nickname: CCNHS-Main
- Publication: Ang Kawayan (Filipino), Greenhills Echo (English)
- Affiliation: Department of Education
- Website: wwwcauayancityhigh.edu.ph

The Cauayan City National High School - Main is a public educational institution established in Cauayan, Isabela, Philippines. It was founded on June 3, 1997, as an extension of Cauayan Polytechnic College, now Isabela State University-Cauayan Campus.

It was formerly named Cauayan National High School since its inception and was later renamed to its present name when Cauayan, Isabela became a city on March 30, 2001. In 2013, Cauayan City National High School won as the greenest school in the Philippines.

== Administration ==
The school is under the administration of the Department of Education (DepEd) Schools Division of Cauayan. Mr. Eddie C. Reyes, Secondary School Principal II, has been serving as the newly assigned principal of Cauayan City National High School since June 30, 2025.

Since the start of the school year 2022-2023, Cauayan City National High School - Main has transitioned its Senior High School Department to an independent institution, now known as Cauayan City Stand-Alone Senior High School. This change has allowed the school to operate autonomously, with John R. Mina, PhD, serving as its Secondary School Principal IV.

== Education programs ==
Cauayan City National High School has educational programs for students for the following curriculum:

- Science, Technology, and Engineering Curriculum (STE)
- Special Program in Arts (SPA)
- Special Program in Sports (SPS)
- Special Program in Journalism (SPJ)
- Special Program in Foreign Language (SPFL)
- Basic Education Curriculum (BEC)
- Science, Technology, Engineering and Math (STEM)

The school is currently implementing Grades 7 to 10 in accordance with the K to 12 program of the Department of Education.
