= Grace Padaca =

Former Governor of Isabela

31st Governor of Isabela
- In office June 30, 2004 – June 30, 2010
- Vice Governor: Ramon Reyes
- Preceded by: Faustino S. Dy Jr.
- Succeeded by: Faustino G. Dy III

Commissioner of the Commission on Elections
- In office October 8, 2012 – June 30, 2014
- Appointed by: Benigno Aquino III
- Preceded by: Augusto Lagman

Personal details
- Born: Maria Gracia Cielo Magno Padaca; October 25, 1963 (age 62) Cauayan, Isabela, Philippines
- Party: Aksyon (2004–2007; 2018–present)
- Other political affiliations: Independent (2014–2018); Liberal (2007–2014)
- Education: Lyceum of the Philippines University

Maria Gracia Cielo "Grace" Magno Padaca (born October 25, 1963) is a Filipino politician and former journalist who served as governor of Isabela from 2004 until 2010. She is also a recipient of the Ramon Magsaysay Award for Public Service in 2008.

During her childhood, she survived polio; she has walked with crutches for most of her life.

== Early life and career ==
Maria Gracia Cielo "Grace" Padaca was born in 1963 in Cauayan, Isabela to Bernardo Padaca and Amelia Magno, both of whom were public school teachers. At three years old, she was left paralyzed for life due to polio, forcing her to use crutches. In 1984 she graduated from the Lyceum of the Philippines University with a degree in Accounting but went into journalism and political commentary, working for the Cauayan branch of the national radio broadcaster Bombo Radyo in 1986 as an accountant, program host and later assistant station manager. In 2000, she quit journalism and became an auditor at the Commission on Audit and later the Government Service Insurance System until 2001. Around 2003, she worked as an accountant for businessman Enrique Zobel.

Padaca's stint at Bombo Radyo turned her into a household name in Isabela with her criticism of the ruling Dy political dynasty, illegal gambling rackets (jueteng) and logging. In 1995, Padaca helped galvanize residents to vote no to a proposal that would have partitioned the province of Isabela into two halves, which was supported by the Dys. Aside from her usual commentaries, she had the provincial anthem broadcast every hour.

== Entry into politics ==
Padaca ran for Congress as representative of Isabela's 3rd congressional district in 2001 but lost to Faustino "Bojie" Dy III, by a margin of 1,285 votes (he got 50.7 percent of the vote to her 49.3 percent). She protested the results of 151 ballot boxes. Dy countered, questioning the results not only of the 151 precincts but all 812 precincts in the district. Padaca initiated what she called an "Adopt A Ballot Box" campaign to raise funds to cover the cost of a ballot box revision. After two and a half years, the House of Representatives Electoral Tribunal (HRET), in a decision promulgated on December 18, 2003, declared Dy the winner by 48 votes. The majority of the HRET refused to count ballots with "Grace" written on them in favor of Grace Padaca.

== Governorship ==
Padaca ran for Governor of Isabela and won the 2004 gubernatorial election with 55% of the vote and with a margin of 44,292 votes against the reelectionist incumbent Faustino Dy, Jr.

Once in office, Padaca immediately set out to implement a progressive platform, focusing on fiscal reform, livelihood improvement and environmental protection. She instituted a comprehensive overhaul on provincial finances that reduced the provincial government's debt by two-thirds and led to budget surpluses by the time she left office. One of her administration's flagship projects was a Hybrid Rice Program, designed to improve the farmers' livelihoods by increasing their yield and providing them reasonable borrowing terms. This led to 10 towns becoming among the top producers of hybrid rice in the Cagayan Valley. She implemented a price support fund with the National Food Authority that allotted a P5-per-kilo subsidy for the purchase by the NFA of rice and corn from farmers. Padaca also implemented significant reforms in the bureaucracy such as augmenting the incomes of public attorneys with a P2,000 monthly allowance, expanding PhilHealth coverage to include up to 700,000 individuals, investing around P98 million in premium payments and doubling the allowances of barangay health workers.

Padaca campaigned against illegal logging by reactivating the anti-illegal task force. She intensified anti-logging patrols though the creation of a forest protection task force in 2006 for the Northern Sierra Madre Natural Park, one of the last remaining areas of virgin forests and biodiversity in the country. About 1.8 million board feet worth more than P30 million—the biggest haul of illegal timber in the history of the Philippines—was confiscated by the provincial government at the height of her anti-logging campaign.

On December 5, 2007, United States Ambassador Kristie Kenney personally conferred to Padaca the International Women of Courage Award, an award which was also conferred to former U.S. Secretary of State Condoleezza Rice. It was bestowed on Padaca for her continued development of Isabela. On July 31, 2008, she was among the eight winners of the Ramon Magsaysay Award for Government Service for "empowering Isabela voters to reclaim their democratic right to elect leaders of their own choosing, and to contribute as full partners in their own development."

Padaca, Governor Eddie Panlilio of Pampanga, Naga City Mayor Jesse Robredo, and Mayor Sonia Lorenzo of San Isidro, Nueva Ecija, launched Kaya Natin, a group that "seeks to recruit principled local government officials to change the country's deteriorating political situation." Their 'Islands of Hope' - university campus tour, a movement for ethical leadership and good governance was launched on July 31, 2008, at the Ateneo de Manila University's Walter Hogan Conference Center in Quezon City.

Padaca ran for a second term in 2007 as a candidate of the Liberal Party, running against former Governor Benjamin Dy. Padaca won with a lead of 17,007 votes (Santos 2009). However, Dy petitioned the Commission on Elections (Comelec) for a recount of 683 ballot boxes from 12 towns, alleging that thousands of votes for Padaca were written by a single individual. In 2009, it ruled that Dy got 199,435 votes against Padaca's 198,384, or a lead of 1,051 votes. It also ordered the annulment of her term and Dy's immediate inauguration. But Padaca managed to stay in office after filing an appeal.

In the 2010 election Padaca was defeated by outgoing congressman and previous electoral rival Bojie Dy with a margin of 3,438 votes.

== Post-governorship ==
In 2012, an arrest warrant was issued against Padaca over a graft case filed in 2006. She was bailed by her ally, President Benigno Aquino III but was convicted by the Sandiganbayan in 2019 and was sentenced to up to 24 years imprisonment, a P36-million fine and perpetual disqualification from public office. However, she appealed and secured the court's reversal of her graft conviction while upholding her conviction for malversation. She remains free pending another appeal. In a separate case, Padaca was fined P4000 by the Sandiganbayan in 2017 after pleading guilty to not filing her Statements of Assets, Liabilities and Net Worth (SALN) from 2007 to 2010.

Padaca was appointed by President Aquino to the Commission on Elections in 2012, but her appointment was not confirmed due to her pending graft case, and she was not reappointed after being bypassed by the Commission on Appointments in 2014.

In 2016, Padaca ran again for Governor but lost to reelectionist Faustino Dy III by over 300,000 votes. In 2019, she ran for Vice Governor, allying with Congressman Napoleon Dy, who had a falling-out with his half-brother Faustino III. However, the Dys reconciled before the campaign began, leaving Padaca on her own to run as a candidate of Aksyon Demokratiko but losing again to the outgoing Governor, who received 483,392 votes to Padaca's 166,972.

== In popular culture ==
Padaca was played by Janice de Belen in a portrayal of her life in the GMA Network drama anthology series Magpakailanman in 2004.
