= Benjamin Dy =

Filipino politician (1952–2013)

Benjamin G. Dy

Mayor of Cauayan, Isabela
- In office June 30, 2010 – February 16, 2013
- Vice Mayor: Bartolome A. Malillin
- Preceded by: Caesar Dy Sr.
- Succeeded by: Bartolome A. Malillin
- In office February 1, 1988 – March 18, 1992
- Vice Mayor: Leoncio Dalin (1988–1992); Faustino Dy III (January–March 1992)
- Preceded by: Simeon Tomas Dela Cruz
- Succeeded by: Faustino Dy III
- In office 1983–1986
- Vice Mayor: Vacant
- Preceded by: Carlos Uy
- Succeeded by: Diosdado Ramirez (OIC)

29th Governor of Isabela
- In office June 30, 1992 – June 30, 2001
- Vice Governor: Manuel Binag (1992–1995); Edwin Uy (1995–2001)
- Preceded by: Faustino Dy Sr.
- Succeeded by: Faustino Dy Jr.

Personal details
- Born: Benjamin de Guzman Dy; September 22, 1952 Cauayan, Isabela, Philippines
- Died: February 16, 2013 (aged 60) Quezon City, Philippines
- Party: Nationalist People's Coalition
- Spouse: Cecilia M. Dy
- Children: 17
- Occupation: Politician

Benjamin de Guzman Dy (September 22, 1952 – February 16, 2013) was a Filipino politician who served as Governor of Isabela. Dy was a member of the Dy political clan, whose members have held various elective posts in the province since the 1960s.

== Early life ==
Benjamin G. Dy, Sr. was born in Cauayan, Isabela on September 22, 1952. He was the eldest among the children of the political patriarch Faustino Dy Sr. and Natividad Guzman-Dy.

== Family ==
Benjamin Dy had a wife, Cecilia M. Dy, and 17 children. Several of Dy's relatives became prominent public figures in their own right:

- Faustino N. Dy, Sr. (father) Governor (1971–1986, 1988–1992) of Isabela and Mayor (1964–1971) of Cauayan
- Faustino S. Dy, Jr. (brother) Representative of the 3rd District of Isabela (1992–2001); Governor (2001–2004)
- Faustino "Bojie" G. Dy III (brother). Speaker of the House of Representatives (2025–present), Representative of the 6th District of Isabela (2025–present), Representative of the 3rd District of Isabela (2001–2010), Vice Mayor of Cauayan (1992), Mayor of Cauayan (1992–2001), Vice Governor of Isabela (2019–2025) and Governor of Isabela (2010–2019)
- Caesar G. Dy (brother). Mayor of Cauayan (2001–2010)
- Napoleon S. Dy (brother). Mayor of Alicia (2001–2010), and Representative of the 3rd District of Isabela (2010–2019)
- Victor G. Dy (brother). Barangay captain of San Fermin, Cauayan (2001–2004)

== Political life ==
Dy served as vice mayor of Cauayan, Isabela until 1983 when Mayor Carlos Uy was appointed Assistant Provincial Health Officer in Ilagan. As a result, he was elevated to mayor, serving from 1983 to 1986 and again from 1988 to 1992. He later became Isabela governor from 1992 to 2001. He lost the governorship in 2007 to Grace Padaca. Dy was supposed to run as Cauayan mayor in the 2013 midterm elections, but was replaced by his son Bernard because of an ailment.

== Death ==
Dy died on February 16, 2013, due to complications from recurring emphysema at St. Luke's Medical Center – Quezon City in Metro Manila.
