= Faustino Dy =

Former governor of Isabela (1971–1986; 1988–1992)

Faustino Dy Sr.

27th Governor of Isabela
- In office February 1988 – June 30, 1992
- Vice Governor: Manuel Binag
- Preceded by: Silvestre Bello Jr.
- Succeeded by: Benjamin Dy
- In office December 30, 1971 – May 1986
- Vice Governor: Wilson Nuesa
- Preceded by: Samuel Reyes
- Succeeded by: Melanio Singson

Mayor of Cauayan, Isabela
- In office December 30, 1963 – December 30, 1971
- Vice Mayor: Herminio Albano (1964–1967); Francisco Dalupang (1968–1969); Carlos Uy (1969–1971)
- Preceded by: Tranquilino Dalupang
- Succeeded by: Carlos Uy

Member of the Cauayan Municipal Council
- In office December 30, 1959 – December 30, 1963

Personal details
- Born: Faustino Ng Dy; April 13, 1925 Guimba, Nueva Ecija, Philippine Islands
- Died: October 3, 1993 (aged 68) Cauayan, Isabela, Philippines
- Party: NPC (1992)
- Other political affiliations: Liberal (1961–1972); KBL (1978-1986); Lakas ng Bansa (1988–1991); Lakas-NUCD (1991–1992)
- Spouse(s): Erlinda Sanchez-Dy; Natividad de Guzman-Dy
- Children: 9, including Faustino Jr., Benjamin & Faustino III

Faustino Ng Dy Sr. (April 13, 1925 – October 3, 1993) was a Filipino politician who served as mayor of Cauayan, Isabela from 1964 to 1971 and governor of Isabela from 1971 until 1986 and from 1988 to 1992. The longest serving governor of the province, ruling for 18 years, he was also the patriarch of the Dy political dynasty.

== Early life ==
Faustino Ng Dy was born on April 13, 1925, as the mestizo son of a Chinese immigrant in Guimba, Nueva Ecija. He worked as an ambulant trader traveling between Nueva Ecija and Bambang, Nueva Vizcaya before settling in Cauayan, Isabela.

== Personal life ==
After his first marriage to Erlinda Sanchez, from which his first children Faustino Jr, Napoleon and Bill were born, he married Natividad De Guzman of Nueva Ecija, who was a sister of Grasing de Guzman, the chief enforcer of film producer and landowner Narcisa de León. She had four sons with him who later became politicians: Faustino III (the Speaker of the House of Representatives since 2025), Benjamin, Caesar, and Victor. Dy quickly established a popular reputation as a person considered to be matapang (ferocious, brave), with stories about him engaging in gunfights with thugs.

== Political career ==
In 1959 he was elected municipal councilor in Cauayan and became mayor on December 30, 1963. Dy was elected governor of Isabela in 1971 as a member of the Liberal Party and served until 1986. Despite being a close friend of Liberal leader and senator Ninoy Aquino, Dy switched his support to Aquino's political rival, President Ferdinand Marcos after his imposition of martial law in 1972, later joining his Kilusang Bagong Lipunan (KBL) party. During his term, Dy oversaw the construction of multiple infrastructure projects in the province such as the Magat Dam in Ramon and the current provincial capitol building in Ilagan but was also criticized for failing to halt logging by Marcos cronies, human rights abuses by the dictatorship and the presence of the New People's Army in the province.

When President Corazon Aquino came to power in 1986, she initially removed Dy from his position as part of her nationwide reorganization of local government, but eventually reconciled with him and welcomed Dy into her administration. This enabled Dy to regain the post of governor in the 1988 elections, serving until his retirement in 1992. He was succeeded by his son Benjamin.

== Death ==
Dy died on October 3, 1993, aged 68.

== Legacy ==
In 2000, the Isabela Provincial Hospital in Ilagan was renamed into the Gov. Faustino N. Dy, Sr. Memorial Hospital under Sangguniang Panlalawigan Resolution No. 0168.
