= First Isabela Cooperative Bank =

Bank in the Philippines

- Company type: Cooperative Bank
- Industry: Finance
- Founded: Cauayan, Isabela, Philippines (1976)
- Headquarters: Maharlika Hwy., Minante 1, Cauayan, Isabela, Philippines
- Key people: Erwin B. Tabucol (Chairperson of the Board); Atty. Hubert E. Molina (President & CEO)
- Products: Financial services
- Net income: ₱145.92 million ▲(2020)
- Total assets: ₱4.6 billion (Q3 2022)
- Number of employees: 448
- Website: ficobank.com.ph

First Isabela Cooperative Bank, commonly known as FICOBank, is a cooperative bank in the Philippines established in the mid-1970s. It is primarily engaged in financial intermediation between and among: the farmers, fishers and their organizations; the micro, small and medium entrepreneurs; the rural, urban and overseas workers; and the other groups of financial consumers. It also provides money-transfer/remittance, cash-dispensing, microinsurance and other fee-based services to the public. As of 31 December 2022, FICOBank has 40 branches located in the provinces of Isabela, Quirino, Nueva Vizcaya, Cagayan, Tarlac, Nueva Ecija, Bataan, Pampanga, Pangasinan, Bulacan and Kalinga.

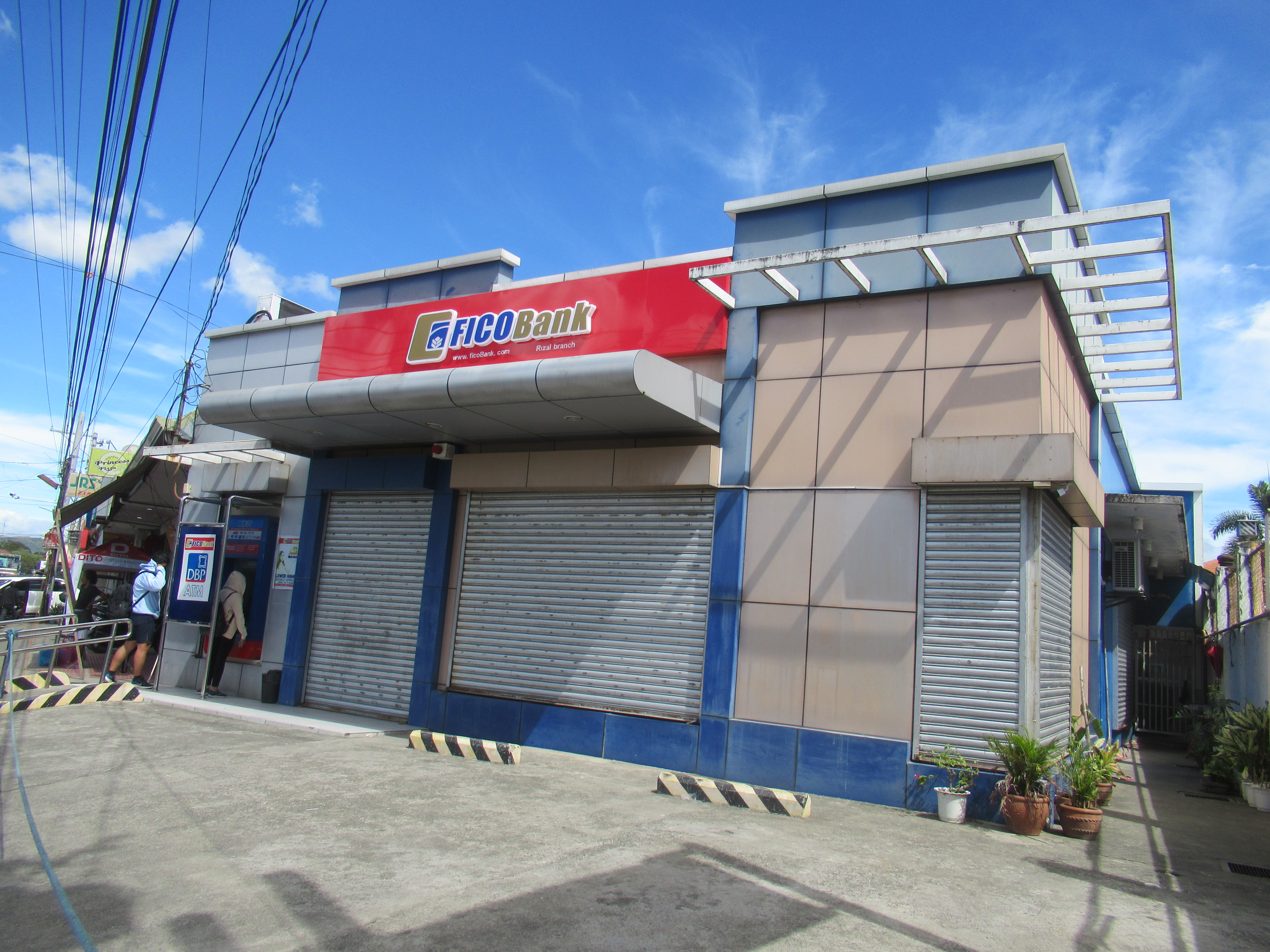
Rizal, Nueva Ecija

== History ==
The Philippine Cooperative Program of the ‘70s during the Marcos administration paved the way for the organization of cooperative banks in the country. A group of technocrats led by Dr. Orlando J. Sacay, the recognized father of the Philippine cooperative banking system, worked for the enactment of Presidential Decree 175, espousing the formation of economic institutions or cooperatives. Composed of small farmers, these cooperatives were primarily organized to look after their own interests.

To serve as the foundation of the cooperative rural banks and area marketing cooperatives, samahang nayon (pre-cooperatives) were organized in the rural areas. Thus, the triangular approach to rural development—production (under the samahang nayon), credit (under a cooperative rural bank), and marketing (under an area marketing cooperative)—was put into operation. It was envisioned that there would be social equity if these three vital functions of rural development were placed in the hands of the farmers.

In 1973, the Regional Cooperative Development Program for Cagayan Valley (RCDP-CV) was launched to develop the farming communities of the region. With financial assistance from the Canadian International Development Agency, the program sought to: improve farm productivity; diversify agricultural production; increase household income; and install a system of cooperatives, as an indispensable support mechanism. The institution of the cooperative rural banking system, as a major component of the program, was in line with the recognition of the importance of rural finance for development.

The bank was officially formed on 10 September 1976. It was the time when the authorized representatives of two cooperatives and 47 samahang nayon unanimously agreed and voluntarily joined together to establish a cooperative rural bank in the province of Isabela. The primordial objective for its establishment was to provide financing to farmers and small entrepreneurs who have limited resources and access to banking services.

Originally, the bank was registered with the Securities and Exchange Commission (SEC), as First Isabela Cooperative Rural Bank Inc. (FICRBI). On 14 February 1979, it acquired its juridical personality through the SEC's stamp of approval and registration. It was re-registered with the Bureau of Cooperative Development of the Ministry of Local Government and Community Development (BCOD-MLGCD) on 10 April 1979, under Certificate of Registration No. FF-119. The Central Bank of the Philippines granted the bank its Certificate of Authority, numbered B-1000, on 21 December 1979 to operate as a cooperative rural bank. As such, it is vested with the rights to exercise all authority and powers, to do and perform all acts and to transact all businesses, which may be legally done by rural banks under the Rural Banking Act, and to do all other things incident thereto, as may be determined by the Monetary Board of the Central Bank of the Philippines (now known as Bangko Sentral ng Pilipinas or BSP).

The bank was formally inaugurated on 2 January 1980. Being a cooperative bank, FICRBI (now FICOBank) is under the supervision of both the BSP and the Cooperative Development Authority (CDA). The latter was created by the enactment of Republic Act 6939. Together with Republic Act 6938 or the 1990 Cooperative Code of the Philippines, they are known as the twin Cooperative Laws of the country. In compliance with the provisions of the said laws, FICOBank obtained CDA's confirmation of its registration as a cooperative bank. Its Certificate of Confirmation, numbered 661, was issued by the CDA on 11 March 1991.

After staying at the CAVADECO compound in Cauayan, Isabela for about fifteen years, FICOBank moved out and began its branching initiative to other parts of the province and its neighboring provinces in the region. In 1995, it opened its first branch in Roxas, Isabela. This was followed, in succession, by its branches in Alicia and Cauayan, both in Isabela, in 1996. The Maddela Branch in Quirino province was opened in 1998. In the same year, its Jones Branch, also in Isabela, became its fifth branch. In 2003, its Cauayan Branch was transferred to Santiago City. A year later, the bank's Head Office—the nerve center of its operations—was inaugurated in its present location in Cauayan, Isabela. A branch in Dupax del Sur, the first operating unit of the bank in the province of Nueva Vizcaya, was also opened in the same year. It was later transferred to the municipality of Solano. FICOBank established its foothold in the whole region by opening its branch in Solana, Cagayan in 2005.

A few years later, two field offices in Diffun, Quirino and Aurora, Isabela were opened, and two more branches in the municipalities of Paniqui and Concepcion in Tarlac were inaugurated. Field offices in San Mateo, Ilagan City, Echague, Tumauini and Cabagan—all in Isabela—and in Bambang, Nueva Vizcaya were opened, one after the other. The bank also opened one branch each in the municipalities of Dinalupihan and Orani in Bataan, and Cabanatuan in Nueva Ecija, all in Region III.

In 2009, FICOBank opened its five new branches, one in Cagayan and four in Pangasinan. The northernmost town of Aparri is the site of the new branch in Cagayan, while the municipalities of Umingan, Malasiqui, Lingayen, and Mangaldan are the locations of the new branches of the bank in the province of Pangasinan. The Orani Branch in Bataan was also transferred to Urdaneta City in Pangasinan in the same year. The bank's 27th operating unit was officially opened in Tuguegarao City in 2010.

Its field offices were converted into extension offices, and all became full-fledged branches afterward. Its banking offices in Umingan (Pangasinan), Cabagan (Isabela), and Mangaldan (Pangasinan) were transferred to Guimba (Nueva Ecija), Gapan City (Nueva Ecija), and San Fernando City (Pampanga), respectively. Later on, five more branches were opened in Cauayan (Isabela), Baliwag (Bulacan), San Jose City (Rizal), and Zaragoza (Nueva Ecija). In December 2017, the bank inaugurated its 33rd banking unit in Abulug (Cagayan). Six months later, FICOBank opened another branch in Cagayan, specifically in Gonzaga. In 2019, the bank opened its three new banking units in Science City of Muñoz and Aliaga (Nueva Ecija) and Tabuk City (Kalinga). And in March 2021, FICOBank inaugurated its first branch-lite unit in Cabatuan (Isabela).

== See also ==
- List of banks in the Philippines
- List of Thrift and Rural/Cooperative Banks with Demand Deposits in the Philippines
