= Mayor of Cauayan, Isabela =

Mayor of Cauayan
- Incumbent; Caesar "Jaycee" Dy Jr. since June 30, 2022
- Appointer: Elected via popular vote
- Term length: 3 years
- Formation: 1901

The mayor of Cauayan (Filipino: Punong Lungsod ng Cauayan) is the head of the local government of the city of Cauayan, Isabela, who is elected to three year terms. The Mayor is also the executive head and leads the city's departments in executing the city ordinances and improving public services. The city mayor is restricted to three consecutive terms, totaling nine years, although a mayor can be elected again after an interruption of one term.

== List ==
=== Municipal Mayors (1900–2001) ===
| | Mayor | Term |
|---|---|---|
| 1 | Eustacio Canciller | 1900-1902 |
| | Bruno Dalauidao (disputed) | 1900-1903 |
| 2 | Pascual Dalupang | 1902-1904 |
| 3 | Leon Banigan | 1904-1907 |
| 4 | Vicente Canan | c.1908 |
| 5 | Bernardo Cadiz Dacuycuy | 1907-1910; 1915-1917 |
| 6 | Mariano Bucag | 1918-1920 |
| 7 | Prospero Cortez | 1921-1923; 1932-1935 |
| 8 | Raymundo Zipagan | 1926–1929 |
| 9 | Simplicio Albano | 1929-1932 |
| 10 | Felipe Bucag | 1935-1938 |
| | Calixto Damatan (disputed) | 1936-1937 |
| 11 | Guillermo Blas | 1938 |
| 12 | Zoilo Cuntapay | 1938–1941 |
| 13 | Federico Padron Acio | 1941–1942; 1945-1947 |
| | Cecilio Pacaba (disputed) | 1942-1944 |
| 14 | Jose Mendoza Canciller | 1942 |
| 15 | Basilio Pacaba | 1943-1944 |
| 16 | Lucas Banigan | 1944-1945 |
| 17 | Leon Babaran | 1947-1948 |
| 18 | Jose A. Africano | 1948-1955 |
| 19 | Tranquilino Dalupang | 1956-1963 |
| 20 | Faustino N. Dy Sr. | 1964-1971 |
| 21 | Carlos A. Uy | 1972-1983 |
| 22 | Benjamin G. Dy | 1983-1986; 1988-1992 |
| 23 | Diosdado Bueno Ramirez | 1986-1987 |
| 24 | Paulino Santos Sawit | 1987 |
| 25 | Simeon Tomas Dela Cruz | 1987-1988 |
| 26 | Faustino G. Dy III | 1992-2001 |

=== City Mayors (since 2001) ===
| | Mayor | Term |
|---|---|---|
| 1 | Faustino G. Dy III | 2001 |
| 2 | Caesar G. Dy Sr. | 2001-2010 |
| 3 | Benjamin G. Dy | 2010-2013 |
| 4 | Bartolome Agonoy Mallillin | 2013 |
| 5 | Bernard Faustino M. Dy | 2013-2022 |
| 6 | Caesar "Jaycee" Dy Jr. | 2022–present |
