= Rural Bank of Cauayan =

Bank in the Philippines

- Company type: Rural Bank
- Industry: Finance
- Founded: Cauayan, Isabela, Philippines (1965)
- Headquarters: Don Jose Canciller Avenue, District I, Cauayan, Isabela, Philippines
- Key people: Juana Bucag (Founder); Eduardo Bucag (Chairman); Charita Guinid (President)
- Products: Financial services
- Total assets: ₱1.3 billion (March 31, 2018)
- Number of employees: 217
- Website: rbcauayan.com

Rural Bank of Cauayan, Inc. or commonly known as RB Cauayan, is a rural bank established on April 7, 1965, in Cauayan, Isabela, Philippines. It was founded by Ireneo Bucag, Sr. and his wife Juana Bucag together with four other incorporators.

It offers diverse loan products between and among: farmers, fishers and their organizations; micro, small and medium entrepreneurs; and professionals, pensioners and other under served segments of the market.

As of 2018, Rural Bank of Cauayan has a total of 19 branches and one extension office operating in four provinces in Cagayan Valley – Isabela, Cagayan, Quirino and Nueva Vizcaya.
