= Rafaél de Echagüe y Bermingham =

Spanish military officer (1815–1887)

Rafael Echagüe y Bermingham
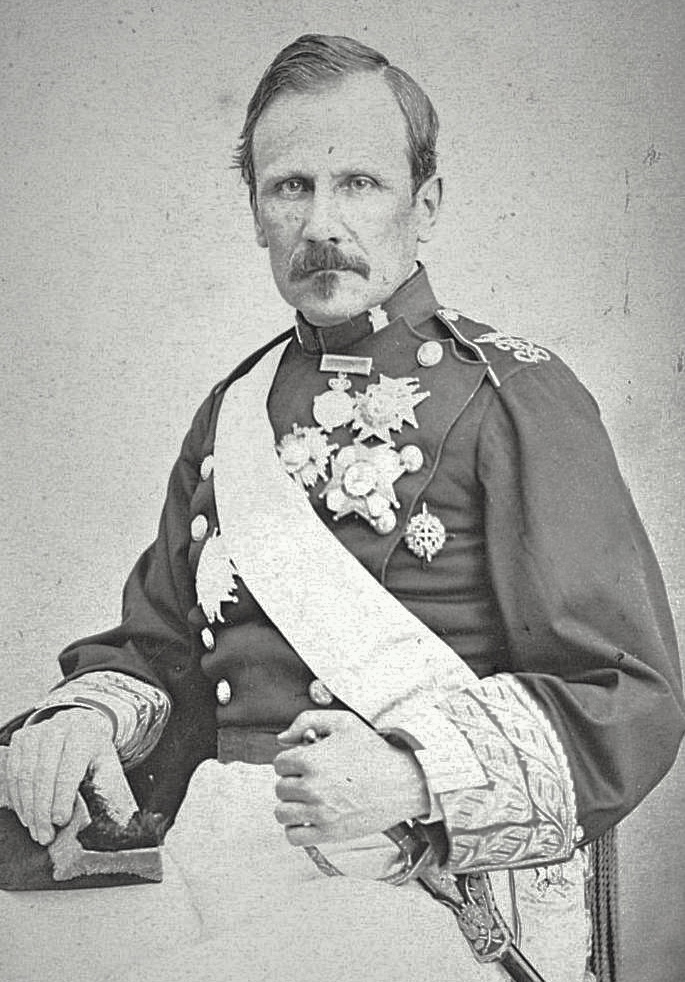

Member of the Senate of Spain
- In office 1872–1887

75th Governor-General of the Philippines
- In office 9 July 1862 – 24 March 1865
- Monarch: Isabella II of Spain
- Prime Minister: Leopoldo O'Donnell
- Minister of Overseas: Leopoldo O'Donnell; Manuel Pando Fernández de Pinedo (as interim); José Gutiérrez de la Concha (as interim); Francisco Permanyer Tuyets; José Gutiérrez de la Concha (as interim); Alejandro de Castro Casal; Diego López Ballesteros; Manuel Seijas Lozano
- Preceded by: Salvador Valdés
- Succeeded by: Joaquín del Solar e Ibáñez

112th Governor of Puerto Rico
- In office 19 August 1860 – 12 March 1862
- Monarch: Isabella II
- Prime Minister: Leopoldo O'Donnell
- Minister of Overseas: Leopoldo O'Donnell
- Preceded by: Sabino Gamir Maladén (as interim)
- Succeeded by: Rafael Izquierdo y Gutiérrez (as interim)

Personal details
- Born: 13 February 1815 San Sebastián, Kingdom of Spain
- Died: 23 November 1887 (aged 72) Madrid, Kingdom of Spain

Military service
- Allegiance: Spain
- Branch/service: Spanish Army
- Rank: General

Rafael de Echagüe y Bermingham (13 February 1815 – 23 November 1887) was a Spanish officer who was governor of the Philippines from 9 July 1862 to 24 March 1865.

== Biography ==
Echagüe was born in San Sebastian (Guipúzcoa), Spain on 13 February 1815. He was the son of Joaquín Echagüe y Barbería and María Josefa Bermingham Measher. He entered the military at the age of eighteen, and in October 1833 he became a sub-lieutenant. His first military experience was during the First Carlist War (1833 – 1840), during which he was a field assistant to General Leopoldo O'Donnell. During the war, he participated in numerous campaigns, some of which led to injuries. For his valor, he was promoted numerous times.

After the war, he was assigned in Puerto Rico from June 1841 to October 1842. He returned to Spain, where he participated in campaigns to quell uprisings throughout the country, and served in numerous military positions. He was then assigned to Morocco during the Spanish–Moroccan War (1859 – 1860), where he led a regiment that fought the Moroccans. It was during this war that he was promoted as lieutenant general. After the war, he was assigned in Valencia, Spain, and eventually in the Philippines.

=== As Governor-General ===
He became Governor-General of the Philippines on 9 July 1862, succeeding José Lémery e Ibarrola Ney. Before his appointment, Salvador Valdés served as acting governor-general.

He established a ministry of colonies in 1863, and a normal school on 23 January 1865. He pursued friendlier relations with the French, aiding them in their campaign in Cochinchina (present-day Vietnam) by sending a battalion of about a thousand native men. As a result, he was awarded the French Legion of Honor. He made efforts to prevent tensions between the religious orders.

He was also known for his admirable response to the great calamities that struck the archipelago during his term. One such calamity was the earthquake of 3 June 1863, which destroyed most of Manila and led to the deaths of hundreds of citizens. Echagüe immediately ordered the repair of the damaged buildings, made efforts to lift the spirits of the inhabitants of the city, and provided comfort and compensation to those whose relatives died during the earthquake. Another calamity was a cholera outbreak, which even led to the death of his wife. In response to the outbreak, he reduced his salary to 15,000 pesos.

Overall, it is said that Echagüe's administration was one of the most effective and positive. He eventually resigned from his position in October 1864. He officially ended his term on 24 March 1865, with Joaquin del Solar e Ibáñez assuming the position of acting Governor-General.

=== After his term ===
He returned to Spain right after he ended his term. There, he served in various military positions. He also became senator for life during the years 1864 to 1868 and from 1877 to 1887; senator for Puerto Rico in 1872; and senator for San Sebastian (Guipúzcoa) in 1876. He eventually died on 23 November 1887.

Throughout his military career, he was awarded with numerous decorations. Such decorations include the Order of St. Hermenegildo, Order of Charles III, Order of Isabella the Catholic, Laureate of San Fernando, and medals for the African War and the siege of Bilbao. He was even awarded the French Legion of Honor for his contributions in Cochinchina. He was also granted the title Count of Serrallo through a royal decree of 21 March 1871.

== Legacy ==
The municipality of Echague, Isabela was named on his honor.

Political offices
Preceded by Salvador Valdés	Governor-General of the Philippines; 1862-1865	Succeeded by Joaquín del Solar e Ibáñez
Preceded by Sabino Gamir Maladen	Governor of Puerto Rico; 1861-1862	Succeeded by Rafael Izquierdo y Gutiérrez
