= Bojie Dy =

Filipino politician (born 1961)

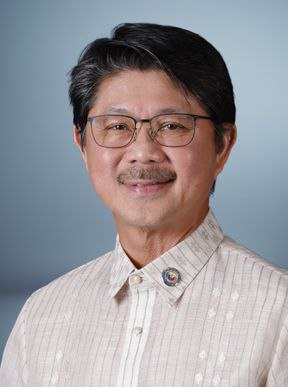
- Official portrait, 2026

29th Speaker of the House of Representatives of the Philippines
- Incumbent
- Assumed office September 17, 2025
- Preceded by: Martin Romualdez

Deputy Speaker of the House of Representatives of the Philippines
- In office July 28, 2025 – September 17, 2025
- Speaker: Martin Romualdez

Member of the Philippine House of Representatives from Isabela
- Incumbent
- Assumed office June 30, 2025
- Preceded by: Inno Dy
- Constituency: 6th district
- In office June 30, 2001 – June 30, 2010
- Preceded by: Ramon Reyes
- Succeeded by: Napoleon Dy
- Constituency: 3rd district

32nd Governor of Isabela
- In office June 30, 2010 – June 30, 2019
- Vice Governor: Rodolfo Albano III (2010–2013); Tonypet Albano (2013–2019)
- Preceded by: Grace Padaca
- Succeeded by: Rodolfo Albano III

14th Vice Governor of Isabela
- In office June 30, 2019 – June 30, 2025
- Governor: Rodolfo Albano III
- Preceded by: Tonypet Albano
- Succeeded by: Francis Dy

Mayor of Cauayan, Isabela
- In office March 18, 1992 – June 30, 2001
- Vice Mayor: Leoncio Dalin (1992–1998); Constante Foronda Jr. (1998–2001)
- Preceded by: Benjamin Dy
- Succeeded by: Caesar Dy Sr.

Vice Mayor of Cauayan, Isabela
- In office January 20, 1992 – March 18, 1992
- Mayor: Benjamin Dy
- Preceded by: Leoncio Dalin
- Succeeded by: Leoncio Dalin

Personal details
- Born: Faustino de Guzman Dy; August 31, 1961 (age 65)
- Party: PFP (since 2024)
- Other political affiliations: PDP (2018–2024); NPC (2004–2009; 2010–2018); Lakas (1992–2004; 2009–2010)
- Spouse: Mary Ann Arcega
- Relations: Dy family
- Children: 2, including Inno
- Parent(s): Faustino Dy (father); Natividad De Guzman (mother)
- Relatives: Benjamin Dy (brother); Ian Paul Dy (nephew); Mike Dy III (nephew); Alyssa Sheena Tan (daughter-in-law)
- Education: University of Santo Tomas (AB)

Faustino "Bojie" De Guzman Dy III (born August 31, 1961) is a Filipino politician who has served as the 29th speaker of the House of Representatives of the Philippines since 2025. A member of the Partido Federal ng Pilipinas, he has served as a representative for Isabela's sixth district since 2025. He previously served as the 32nd governor of Isabela from 2010 to 2019 and as vice governor from 2019 to 2025.

Born to a political family based in Isabela, Dy entered politics at the barangay level, holding various positions in Barangay District 1, Cauayan, Isabela, from 1980 to 1986 and from 1989 to 1992, when he assumed ex officio seats on the Cauayan municipal council and Isabela Provincial Board, respectively, before being appointed the then-municipality's vice mayor in 1992. He succeeded his brother, Benjamin, as mayor of Cauayan in 1992 and held that role until 2001, when he was elected as the representative for Isabela's third district, a position he would hold until 2010. That year, he was elected governor of Isabela.

During his governorship, he promoted policies related to agriculture and welfare. After leaving office in 2019, he served as vice governor under Governor Rodolfo Albano III, holding that role until 2025, when he successfully sought a return to Congress in Isabela's sixth district. Early in his second stint as representative, he was appointed deputy speaker. After the resignation of Speaker Martin Romualdez later that year, he was elected as speaker.

== Early life and education ==
Dy was born on August 31, 1961. He is the son of former Isabela governor Faustino Dy by his second wife, Natividad De Guzman. Dy took up Bachelor of Arts in economics at the University of Santo Tomas.

== Early political career (1980–2010) ==
=== Barangay politics (1980–1992) ===
Dy entered politics in 1980 as the Kabataang Barangay Chairman of Barangay District 1 in Cauayan, Isabela, and the Action Officer of the Kabataang Barangay for Region II. He later became an ex officio barangay councilor of the barangay in 1982. He was removed from his positions following the People Power Revolution in 1986.

In 1989, he was elected as the barangay captain of Barangay District 1, Cauayan and was later named Director of the Kapisanan ng mga Barangay ng Pilipinas (present-day President of the Association of Barangay Captains). The latter earned him an ex officio seat on the Cauayan Municipal Council and eventually on the Isabela Provincial Board to represent the sector.

=== Cauayan politics (1992–2001) ===
On January 20, 1992, he was appointed vice mayor of Cauayan, Isabela, succeeding Leoncio Dalin, who had resigned five days prior. Just two months later, on March 18, 1992, he was elevated to mayor of Cauayan, succeeding his brother Benjamin, who resigned to run for governor of Isabela. He was later elected to a full term as mayor later that May, serving three more consecutive terms ending in 2001. During his final term, Cauayan was converted into a city on March 30, 2001, making him its first city mayor.

=== First stint in Congress (2001–2010) ===
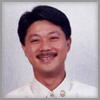
Portrait during the 13th Congress

Dy first entered the House of Representatives in 2001, being elected to represent Isabela's third district, succeeding Ramon Reyes. He was accused of committing electoral fraud by his rival, Grace Padaca, but was cleared by the House electoral tribunal in 2003. He held that seat until 2010, when he was term-limited and ran for governor of Isabela.

During an early morning drive along a national highway with aides in September 2005, Dy's vehicle crashed into a 10-wheeler truck in Diadi, Nueva Vizcaya; he, along with his son Kiko and two security aides, only received minor bruises from the incident, while another aide was brought to the hospital after suffering a head injury.

== Governor of Isabela (2010–2019) ==
=== Elections ===
Dy first ran for the Isabela governorship in the 2010 election, seeking the office under the Nationalist People's Coalition banner. In that race, he defeated the Liberal Party incumbent Grace Padaca, who had served since 2004. In the 2013 election, he ran for reelection with Tonypet Albano as his running mate and defeated Padaca's elder brother Marlo Angelo by a landslide. He faced the younger Padaca again in the 2016 election and won a third and final term with a wide margin.

=== Tenure ===
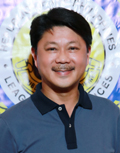
Dy in 2016

Dy assumed the governorship on June 30, 2010. During his governorship, his administration promoted policies related to agriculture and welfare.

In the 2016 Philippine presidential election, he supported the candidacy of former Interior and Local Government Secretary Mar Roxas. At a campaign event for Roxas's rival Grace Poe, Dy and his family took offense at Poe after she questioned his presence at her sorties.

In August 2018, Dy expressed his willingness to participate in localized peace talks with the New People's Army.

== Vice Governor of Isabela (2019–2025) ==
After being term-limited as governor, he sought the vice governorship in the 2019 election, where he defeated Padaca again. In that race, his brother Napoleon accused him of mishandling a road project as governor, a charge he denied before reconciling leading up to election day.

From October 7 to 13, 2019, Dy assumed the duties of the governorship as an officer-in-charge during which Governor Rodolfo Albano III attended a trade fair in Japan. In September 2020, former Angadanan Mayor Manuel Siquian filed a complaint-affidavit against Dy over an alleged anomalous rehabilitation and improvement project for the Ilagan–Divilacan Road, stating that no public bidding was conducted for the project.

== Speaker of the House (2025–present) ==
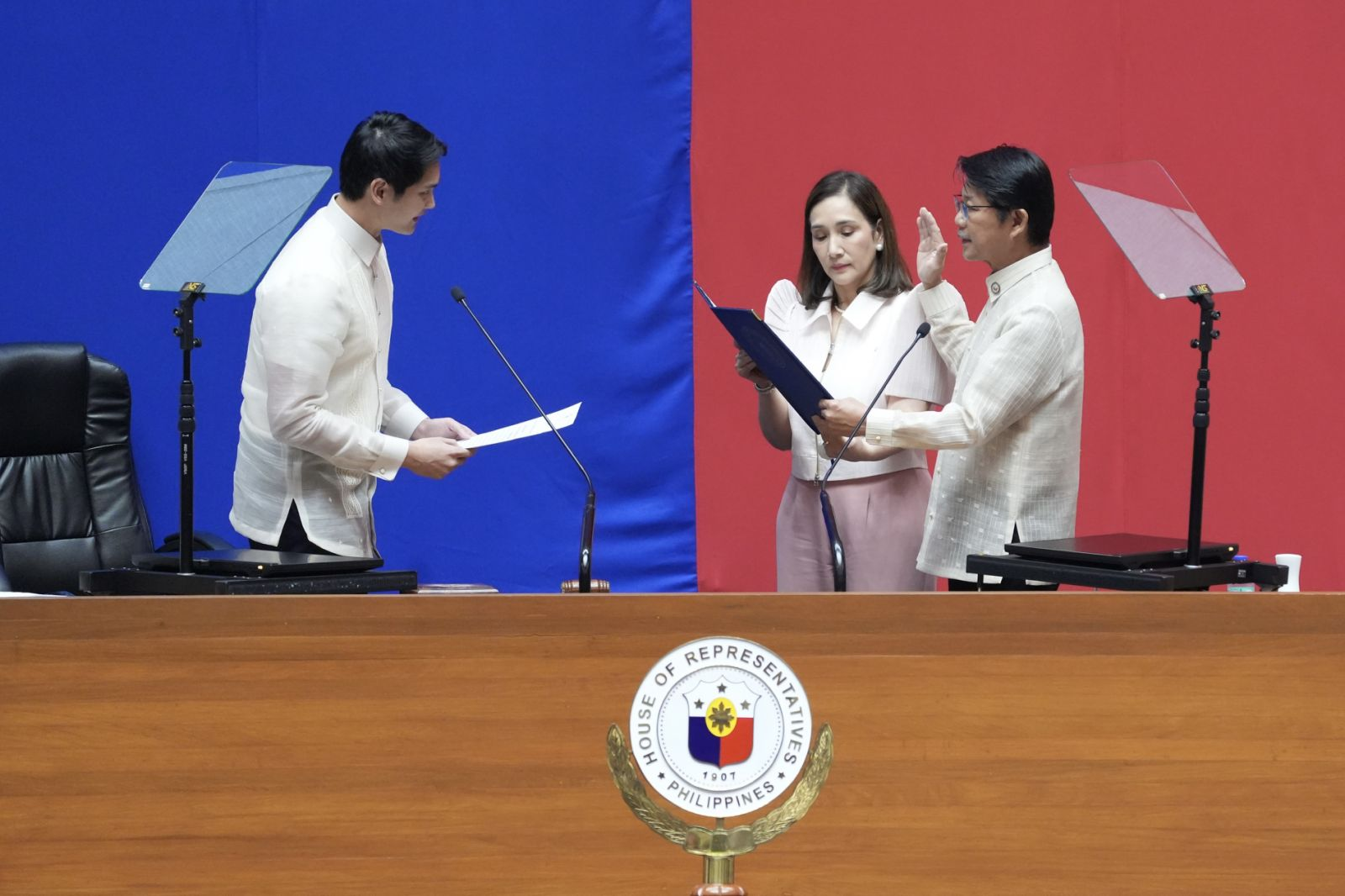
Dy (right) is sworn in by Javi Benitez (left) as the new speaker of the House on September 17, 2025.

=== District elections ===
In October 2024, Dy filed his candidacy to run for the House of Representatives in Isabela's sixth district, running to succeed his son Inno, who ran for mayor of Echague. Running under the Partido Federal ng Pilipinas, he was elected to the seat unopposed and took office on June 30, 2025.

=== Election as Speaker ===
Dy entered the 20th Congress of the Philippines as a deputy speaker under House Speaker Martin Romualdez.

Months leading up to the height of the flood control projects controversy in the Philippines in September 2025, media speculation arose regarding a possible leadership change in the lower house, especially after contractor Sarah Discaya implicated Speaker Romualdez in the alleged anomalies. By September 6, Executive Secretary Lucas Bersamin rebuked Congress under Romualdez's speakership, urging the speaker to "clean up your house first".

On September 17, Romualdez formally resigned as speaker, a move Deputy Speaker Jay Khonghun described as one that aimed to allow Romualdez to better clarify his role in the allegations made against him. Leading up to Romualdez's resignation, media outlets reported that Dy was a leading candidate to replace the former as speaker. Dy was later elected as House Speaker that day, being the only member nominated for the role and receiving 253 votes.

=== Early speakership ===
Upon assuming office, Dy cited regaining public trust in the lower chamber as a key agenda, acknowledging a negative reception to the House of Representatives following the flood control controversy. However, his ascension to the speakership drew criticism from Vice President Sara Duterte and her brother, Davao City 1st district Representative Paolo Duterte. Sara claimed that the move was a sham and a part of a plan by Romualdez and Majority Leader Sandro Marcos, who is Dy's party mate, while Paolo alleged that Dy was handpicked by Marcos and described the change as a mere “cover-up move” that failed to address corruption in the House.

Among his first directives to the chamber was for the members to coordinate with the ad hoc Independent Commission for Infrastructure created by President Bongbong Marcos in response to the scandal. Despite the leadership change, Dy retained the committee assignments present at the time of his election as speaker. On September 19, he had revoked the travel clearance of Ako Bicol Representative Zaldy Co, demanding his return to the Philippines from the United States within 10 days to answer for allegedly anomalous budget insertions and public works.

== Personal life ==
Dy is married to Mary Ann Arcega. Their son, Faustino V ("Inno"), has served as the mayor of Echague since 2025 and previously as representative of Isabela's sixth district from 2019 to 2025. Another son, Francis Faustino ("Kiko"), has served as the vice governor of Isabela since 2025.

== Electoral history ==
Electoral history of Bojie Dy
Year	Office	Party	Votes received				Result
Year	Office	Party	Total	%	P.	Swing	Result
1992	Mayor of Cauayan, Isabela	Lakas	—N/a	—N/a	1st	—N/a	Won
1995	Mayor of Cauayan, Isabela	Lakas	—N/a	—N/a	1st	—N/a	Won
1998	Mayor of Cauayan, Isabela	Lakas	—N/a	—N/a	1st	—N/a	Won
2001	Representative (Isabela–3rd)	Lakas	—N/a	—N/a	1st	—N/a	Won
2004	Representative (Isabela–3rd)	NPC	—N/a	—N/a	1st	—N/a	Won
2007	Representative (Isabela–3rd)	NPC	81,087	—N/a	1st	—N/a	Won
2010	Governor of Isabela	Lakas	274,747	50.09%	1st	—N/a	Won
2013	Governor of Isabela	NPC	358,998	86.10%	1st	+36.01	Won
2016	Governor of Isabela	NPC	451,766	75.27%	1st	-10.83	Won
2019	Vice Governor of Isabela	PDP–Laban	483,608	74.32%	1st	—N/a	Won
2022	Vice Governor of Isabela	PDP–Laban	632,938	100.00%	1st	+25.68	Unopposed
2025	Representative (Isabela–6th)	PFP	129,097	100.00%	1st	—N/a	Unopposed

Political offices
Preceded by Leoncio Dalin	Vice Mayor of Cauayan, Isabela; 1992	Succeeded by Leoncio Dalin
Preceded by Benjamin Dy	Mayor of Cauayan, Isabela; 1992–2001	Succeeded by Caesar Dy Sr.
Preceded by Grace Padaca	Governor of Isabela; 2010–2019	Succeeded by Rodolfo Albano III
Preceded by Tonypet Albano	Vice Governor of Isabela; 2019–2025	Succeeded by Francis Dy
House of Representatives of the Philippines
Preceded by Ramon Reyes	Representative, Isabela's 3rd district 2001–2010	Succeeded by Napoleon Dy
Preceded by Inno Dy	Representative, Isabela's 6th district 2025–present	Incumbent
Preceded by Martin Romualdez	Speaker of the House of Representatives of the Philippines; 2025–present	Incumbent
Order of precedence
Preceded by Win Gatchalian as President of the Senate of the Philippines	Order of Precedence of the Philippines as Speaker of the House of Representatives of the Philippines	Succeeded by Alexander Gesmundo as Chief Justice of the Supreme Court of the Philippines
Lines of succession
Preceded by Win Gatchalian as President of the Senate of the Philippines	Philippine presidential line of succession as Speaker of the House of Representatives of the Philippines	Last
