= Echague =

Municipality in Isabela, Philippines

- Municipality
- Municipality of Echague
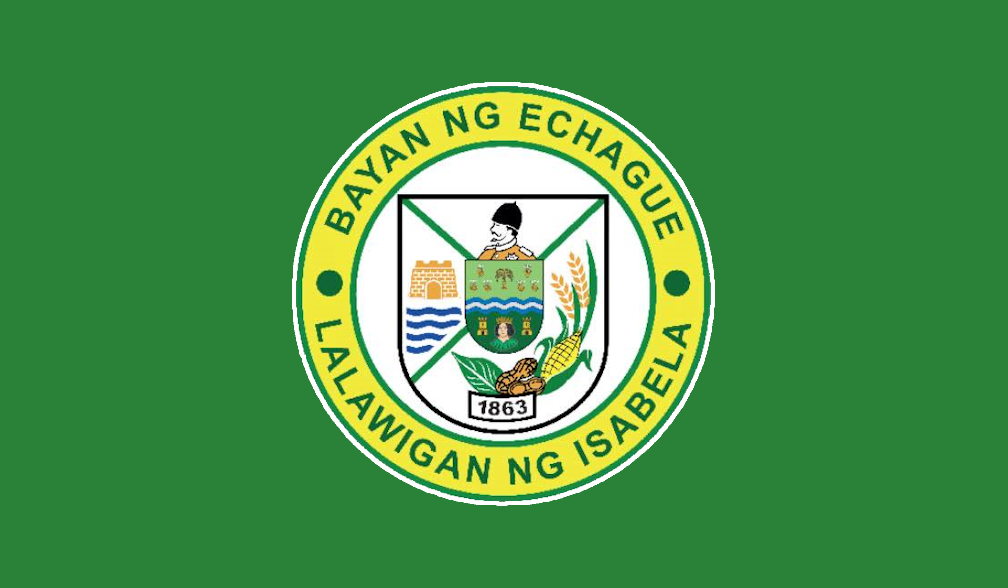
- Flag Seal
- Nicknames: Queen Town of Isabela; Home of the Mengals
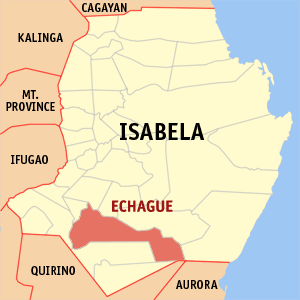
- Map of Isabela with Echague highlighted
- Interactive map of Echague
- Location within the Philippines
- Coordinates: 16°42′20″N 121°40′34″E
- Country: Philippines
- Region: Cagayan Valley
- Province: Isabela
- District: 6th district
- Founded: 1752
- Named for: Rafaél de Echagüe y Bermingham
- Barangays: 64 (see Barangays)

Government
  - Type: Sangguniang Bayan
  - Mayor: Faustino A. Dy V
  - Vice Mayor: Allan P. Tupong
  - Representative: Faustino G. Dy. III
  - Municipal Council: Members: Nenita M. Agustin; Allan P. Tupong; Marcos D. Baccay Jr.; Marlon B. Lim; Marcelina M. Alzate; Nolito D. Panganiban; Walter C. Uy; Roher A. Ballad
  - Electorate: 58,845 voters (2025)

Area
  - Total: 680.80 km^{2} (262.86 sq mi)
- Elevation: 70 m (230 ft)
- Highest elevation: 101 m (331 ft)
- Lowest elevation: 47 m (154 ft)

Population (2024 census)
  - Total: 91,320
  - Density: 134.1/km^{2} (347.4/sq mi)
  - Households: 23,536

Economy
  - Income class: 1st municipal income class
  - Poverty incidence: 11.4% (2023)
  - Revenue: ₱ 656 million (2024)
  - Assets: ₱ 1,527 million (2024)
  - Expenditure: ₱ 618.4 million (2024)
  - Liabilities: ₱ 570.9 million (2024)

Service provider
  - Electricity: Isabela 1 Electric Cooperative (ISELCO 1)
- Time zone: UTC+8 (PST)
- ZIP code: 3309
- PSGC: 0203112000
- IDD : area code: +63 (0)78
- Native languages: Yogad; Ilocano; Tagalog
- Website: www.echague-isabela.gov.ph

Echague, officially the Municipality of Echague, is a municipality in the province of Isabela, Philippines. According to the 2024 census, it has a population of 91,320 people.

It is known for the indigenous and endangered Yogad language, which is spoken and conserved by its locals.

== Etymology ==
Fr. Pedro Salgado, the Dominican writer, in Volume I of his "Cagayan Valley and Eastern Cordillera (1581-1898)," wrote that Echague formerly used to be called Camarag - the name of a big tree then common in the place. Before it separated from Nueva Vizcaya, Camarag was Nueva Vizcaya's first capital, transferring the seat of the provincial government to Bayombong in 1865.

== History ==
The town was founded in 1752 and ecclesiastically placed under the patronage of St. Joseph on May 12, 1753.

Prior to 1856, there were only two provinces in the Cagayan Valley Region: Cagayan and Nueva Vizcaya. The province of Cagayan at that time consisted of all towns from Tumauini to the north in Aparri and all other towns from Ilagan southward to Aritao comprised the Province of Nueva Vizcaya. In order to facilitate the work of the missionaries in the evangelization of the Cagayan Valley, a royal decree was issued on May 1, 1856, that created the Province of Isabela consisting of the towns of Gamu, Angadanan, Bindang (now Roxas) and Camarag (now Echague), Carig (now Santiago City) and Palanan. The new province was named in honor of Queen Isabela II of Spain.

Missionaries wanted to transfer the town from the banks of the Cagayan River to the Ganano River 10 kilometers away. The people rebelled because the soil was more fertile along the Cagayan River. But in 1776, they were forcibly transferred. Some 72 years later, the people returned to Camarag. On 1863, Camarag was renamed after Rafael de Echagüe y Bermingham, a former Spanish governor-general.

== Geography ==
Echague is situated 63.11 kilometres (39.21 mi) from the provincial capital Ilagan, and 375.49 kilometres (233.32 mi) from the country's capital city of Manila.

=== Barangays ===
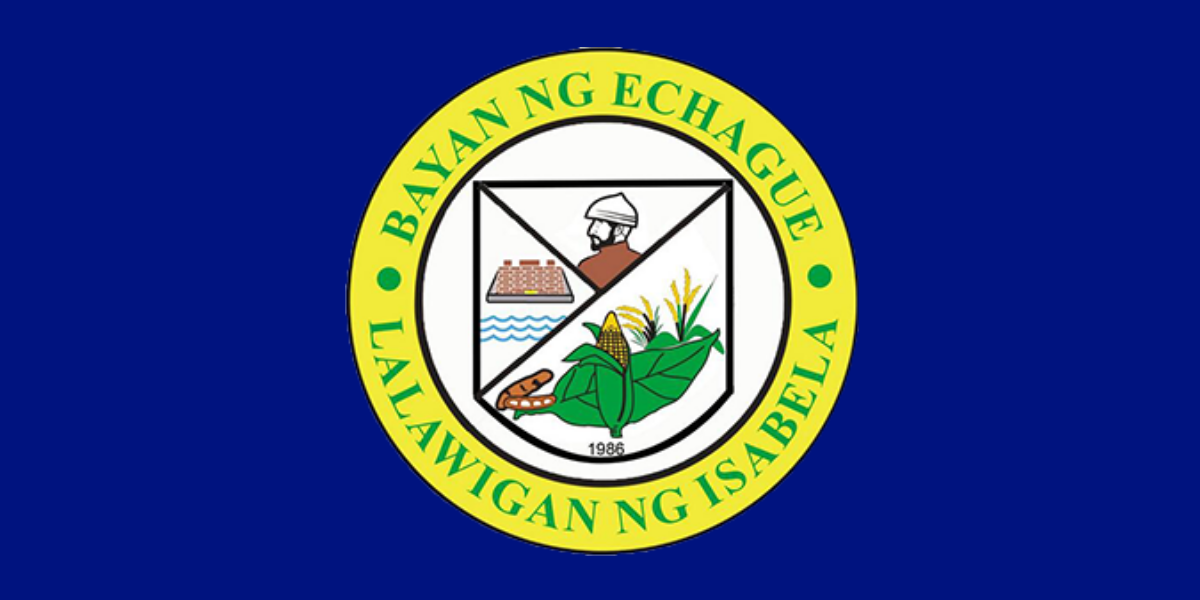
Former flag of Echague

Echague is politically subdivided into 64 barangays. Each barangay consists of puroks while some have sitios.

- Angoluan
- Annafunan
- Arabiat
- Aromin
- Babaran
- Bacradal
- Benguet
- Buneg
- Busilelao
- Cabugao (Poblacion)
- Caniguing
- Carulay
- Castillo
- Dammang East
- Dammang West
- Diasan
- Dicaraoyan
- Dugayong
- Fugu
- Garit Norte
- Garit Sur
- Gucab
- Gumbauan
- Ipil
- Libertad
- Mabbayad
- Mabuhay
- Madadamian
- Magleticia
- Malibago
- Maligaya
- Malitao
- Narra
- Nilumisu
- Pag-asa
- Pangal Norte
- Pangal Sur
- Rumang-ay
- Salay
- Salvacion
- San Antonio Ugad
- San Antonio Minit
- San Carlos
- San Fabian
- San Felipe
- San Juan
- San Manuel (formerly Atelan)
- San Miguel
- San Salvador
- Santa Ana
- Santa Cruz
- Santa Maria
- Santa Monica
- Santo Domingo
- Silauan Sur (Poblacion)
- Silauan Norte (Poblacion)
- Sinabbaran
- Soyung (Poblacion)
- Taggappan (Poblacion)
- Tuguegarao
- Villa Campo
- Villa Fermin
- Villa Rey
- Villa Victoria

=== Climate ===
Climate data for Echague, Isabela
Month	Jan	Feb	Mar	Apr	May	Jun	Jul	Aug	Sep	Oct	Nov	Dec	Year
Mean daily maximum °C (°F)	29 (84)	30 (86)	32 (90)	35 (95)	35 (95)	35 (95)	34 (93)	33 (91)	32 (90)	31 (88)	30 (86)	28 (82)	32 (90)
Mean daily minimum °C (°F)	19 (66)	20 (68)	21 (70)	23 (73)	23 (73)	24 (75)	23 (73)	23 (73)	23 (73)	22 (72)	21 (70)	20 (68)	22 (71)
Average precipitation mm (inches)	31.2 (1.23)	23 (0.9)	27.7 (1.09)	28.1 (1.11)	113.5 (4.47)	141.4 (5.57)	176.4 (6.94)	236.6 (9.31)	224.9 (8.85)	247.7 (9.75)	222.9 (8.78)	178 (7.0)	1,651.4 (65)
Average rainy days	10	6	5	5	13	12	15	15	15	17	16	15	144
Source: World Weather Online

== Demographics ==
Population census of Echague
Year	Pop.	±% p.a.
1903	9,403	—
1918	17,104	+4.07%
1939	16,249	−0.24%
1948	16,311	+0.04%
1960	28,919	+4.89%
1970	36,180	+2.26%
1975	36,834	+0.36%
1980	41,390	+2.36%
1990	51,916	+2.29%
1995	56,119	+1.47%
2000	61,101	+1.84%
2007	67,553	+1.39%
2010	74,680	+3.72%
2015	79,094	+1.10%
2020	88,410	+2.37%
2024	91,320	+0.78%
Source: Philippine Statistics Authority

In the 2024 census, the population of Echague was 91,320 people, with a density of 130 inhabitants per square kilometre or 340 inhabitants per square mile.

== Economy ==
Poverty incidence of Echague (%)

Source: Philippine Statistics Authority

== Government ==
=== Local government ===
As a municipality in the Province of Isabela, government officials at the provincial and municipal levels are voted by the town. The provincial government has political jurisdiction over most local transactions of the municipal government.

The municipality of Echague is governed by a mayor, designated as its local chief executive, and by a municipal council as its legislative body in accordance with the Local Government Code. The mayor, vice mayor, and the municipal councilors are elected directly by the people through an election held every three years.

Barangays are also headed by elected officials: Barangay Captain, Barangay Council, whose members are called Barangay Councilors. The barangays have SK federation which represents the barangay, headed by SK chairperson and whose members are called SK councilors. All officials are also elected every three years.

=== Elected officials ===
Members of the Echague Municipal Council (2022-2025)
Position	Name
District Representative (6th Legislative District of the Province of Isabela)	Faustino A. Dy V
Chief Executive of the Municipality of Echague	Francis Faustino A. Dy
Presiding Officer of the Municipal Council of Echague	Allan P. Tupong
Councilors of the Municipality of Echague	Alfredo V. Alili
Councilors of the Municipality of Echague	Walter C. Uy
Councilors of the Municipality of Echague	Nemesio S. Castillo
Councilors of the Municipality of Echague	Rodolfo Acosta, Jr.
Councilors of the Municipality of Echague	Hector Domingo
Councilors of the Municipality of Echague	Nolito D. Panganiban
Councilors of the Municipality of Echague	Edgardo G. Baccay
Councilors of the Municipality of Echague	Josephine Rivera

=== Congress representation ===
Echague, belonging to the sixth legislative district of the province of Isabela, currently represented by Hon. Faustino G. Dy III.

== Education ==
The Schools Division of Isabela governs the town's public education system. The division office is a field office of the DepEd in Cagayan Valley region. There are currently three school district offices, namely: Echague East, Echague South, and Echague West. These offices govern the public and private elementary and public and private high schools throughout the municipality.

=== Primary and elementary schools ===
- Annafunan Elementary School
- Aromin Elementary School
- Bacradal Elementary School
- Benguet Elementary School
- Buneg Elementary School
- Busilelao Elementary School
- Carulay Elementary School
- Dammang East Elementary School
- Dammang Malitao Elementary School
- Diasan Elementary School
- Dicaraoyan Elementary School
- Dugayong Elementary School
- Echague East Central School
- Echague South Central School
- Echague West Central School
- First Echague United Methodist School
- First Echague United Methodist School
- Fugu Elementary School
- InterActive Children Learning School
- Mabbayad Elementary School
- Madadamian Elementary School
- Malitao Elementary School
- Narra Elementary School
- Pag-asa Elementary School
- Precious Gift Learning School
- Rumang-ay Elementary School
- Salay Elementary School
- Salvacion Elementary School
- San Miguel Elementary School
- San Salvador Elementary School
- Santo Domingo Elementary School
- School of Saint Joseph the Worker
- Soyung Elementary School
- St. Dominic Human Development Center
- St. Joseph Vineyard Montessori School
- Villa Campo Elementary School
- Villa Rey Elementary School

=== Secondary schools ===
- Don Mariano Marcos National High School
- Doña Magdalena H. Gaffud High School
- Echague National High School
- Highway Region National High School
- Imelda R. Marcos High School - Annex
- Imelda R. Marcos High School - Main
- Isabela State University Senior High School
- Pangal Sur High School
- School of St. Joseph the Worker
- St. Dominic Human Development Center, Inc. (SDHDCI)
- Ugad High School

=== Higher educational institution ===
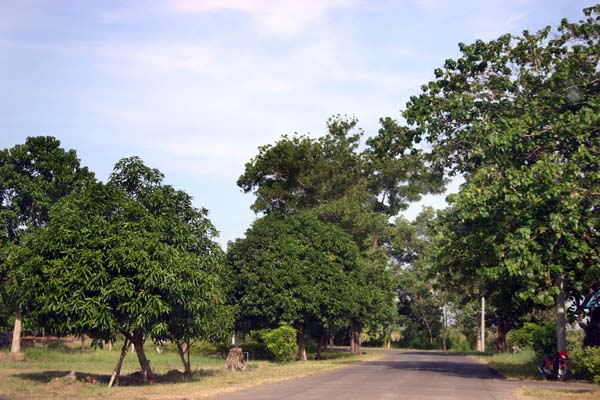
Vicinity of the Isabela State University

- Isabela State University
