= Isabela State University =

Public university in Isabela, Philippines

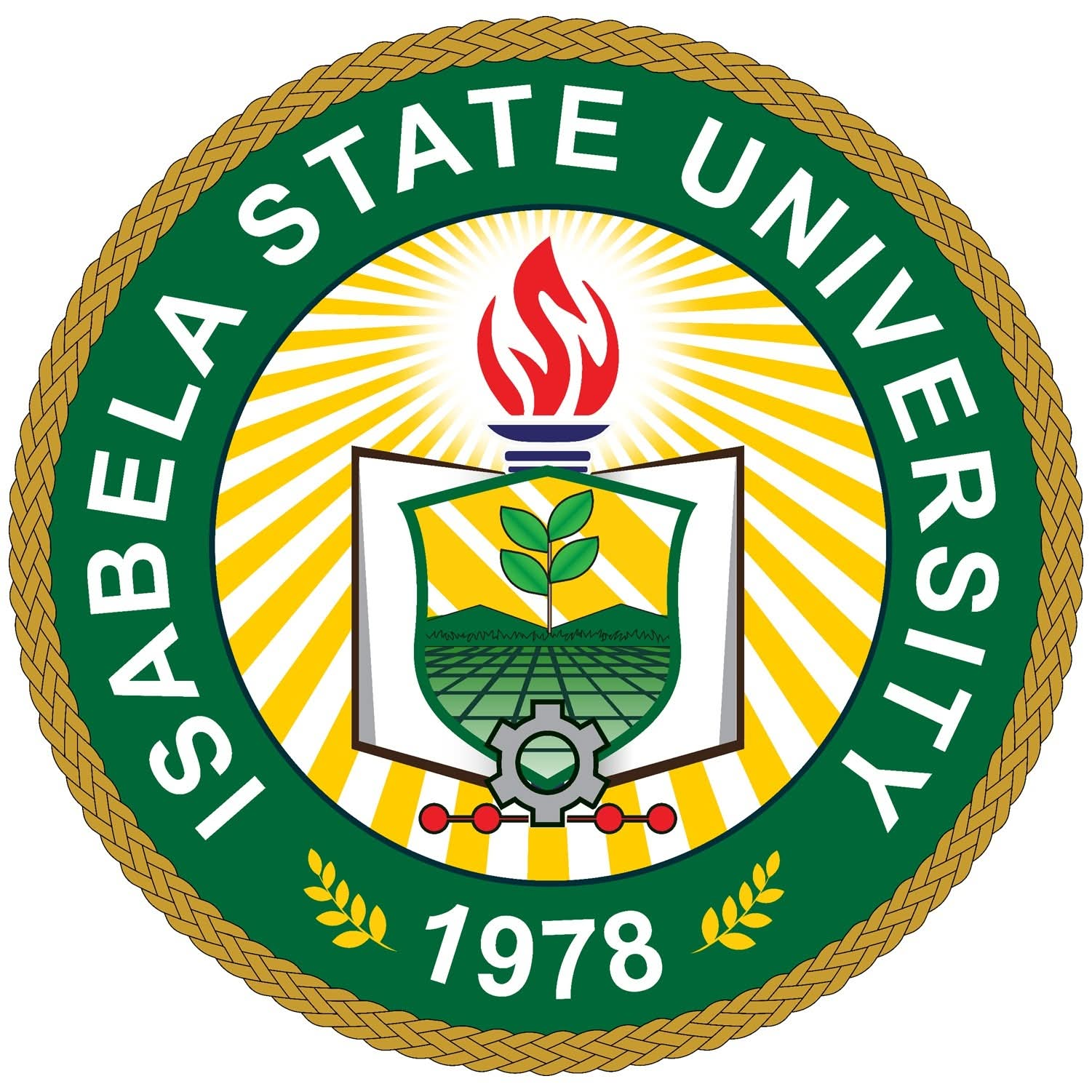
- Former names: Echague Farm School (1918-1946); Isabela Agricultural High School (1946-); Echague Rural High School; Echague Agricultural and Forestry School (1960-); Isabela State College of Agriculture (ISCA) (-1978)
- Motto: "University for People, Nature, Entrepreneurship and Innovation"
- Type: Public Regional State University
- Established: June 10, 1978; 48 years ago
- Academic affiliations: Association of Accredited Chartered Colleges and Universities of the Philippines
- Chairperson: Dr. Marita R. Canapi
- President: Dr. Boyet L. Batang
- Vice-president: List: Precila C. Delima (VP for Academic & Related Affairs); Romano P. Cammayo (VP for Admin. & Finance Services); Orlando F. Balderama (VP for Research & Development, Extension & Training); John N. Cabansag (VP for Planning, External Linkages, Public Relations & Resource Generation Management)
- Location: Echague, Isabela, Philippines; 16°43′18″N 121°41′32″E
- Newspaper: The Forum Publication
- Colors: Green, Brown and Yellow
- Website: www.isu.edu.ph
- Location in Luzon Location in the Philippines

Isabela State University is a public university in the province of Isabela, Philippines. It is mandated to provide advanced instruction in the arts, agricultural and natural sciences as well as technological and professional fields. The main campus is located in Echague, Isabela.
