= Isabela's 6th congressional district =

House of Representatives of the Philippines legislative district

- Constituency for the House of Representatives of the Philippines
- Boundary of Isabela's 6th congressional district in Isabela

- Location of Isabela within the Philippines
- Province: Isabela
- Region: Cagayan Valley
- Population: 279,772 (2020)
- Electorate: 183,197 (2025)
- Major settlements: 4 LGUs: City; Cauayan; Municipalities; Echague; San Guillermo; San Isidro
- Area: 1,414.59 km^{2} (546.18 sq mi)

Current constituency
- Created: 2018
- Representative: Bojie Dy
- Political party: PFP
- Congressional bloc: Majority

Isabela's 6th congressional district is one of the six congressional districts of the Philippines in the province of Isabela. It has been represented in the House of Representatives of the Philippines since 2019. The district consists of the city of Cauayan and the municipalities of Echague, San Guillermo, and San Isidro. It is currently represented in the 20th Congress by Bojie Dy of the Partido Federal ng Pilipinas (PFP). Dy has also served as speaker of the House since September 2025.

== List of members representing the district ==
=== House of Representatives (1987–present) ===
No.	Portrait	Member (Lifespan)	Term of office	Party	Legislature	Electoral history	Constituencies
District created September 27, 2018.
1		Inno Dy (born 1991)	June 30, 2019 – June 30, 2025	PDP–Laban	18th Congress	Elected in 2019.	2019–present Cauayan, Echague, San Guillermo, San Isidro
1		Inno Dy (born 1991)	June 30, 2019 – June 30, 2025	Lakas	19th Congress	Re-elected in 2022.	2019–present Cauayan, Echague, San Guillermo, San Isidro
2		Bojie Dy (born 1961)	June 30, 2025 – present	PFP	20th Congress	Elected in 2025.	2019–present Cauayan, Echague, San Guillermo, San Isidro

== Election results ==
=== 2022 ===
2022 Philippine House of Representatives election in Isabela
Party	Candidate	Votes	%
PDP–Laban	Inno Dy	121,381	49.70
PROMDI	Armando Velasco	12,255	41.84
Valid ballots		133,636	89.03
Invalid or blank votes		16,469	10.97
Total votes		150,105	100.00
PDP–Laban hold			

=== 2025 ===
2025 Philippine House of Representatives election in Isabela
Party	Candidate	Votes	%
PFP	Bojie Dy	129,097	100.00
Valid ballots		129,097	84.50
Invalid or blank votes		23,679	15.50
Total votes		152,776	100.00
PFP gain from Lakas			

== See also ==
- Legislative districts of Isabela

House of Representatives of the Philippines
Preceded by Leyte's 1st congressional district	Home district of the speaker of the House of Representatives; September 17, 2025 – present	Incumbent
