= Cauayan, Isabela =

Component city in Isabela Province, Philippines

Cauayan
- Component city
- City of Cauayan
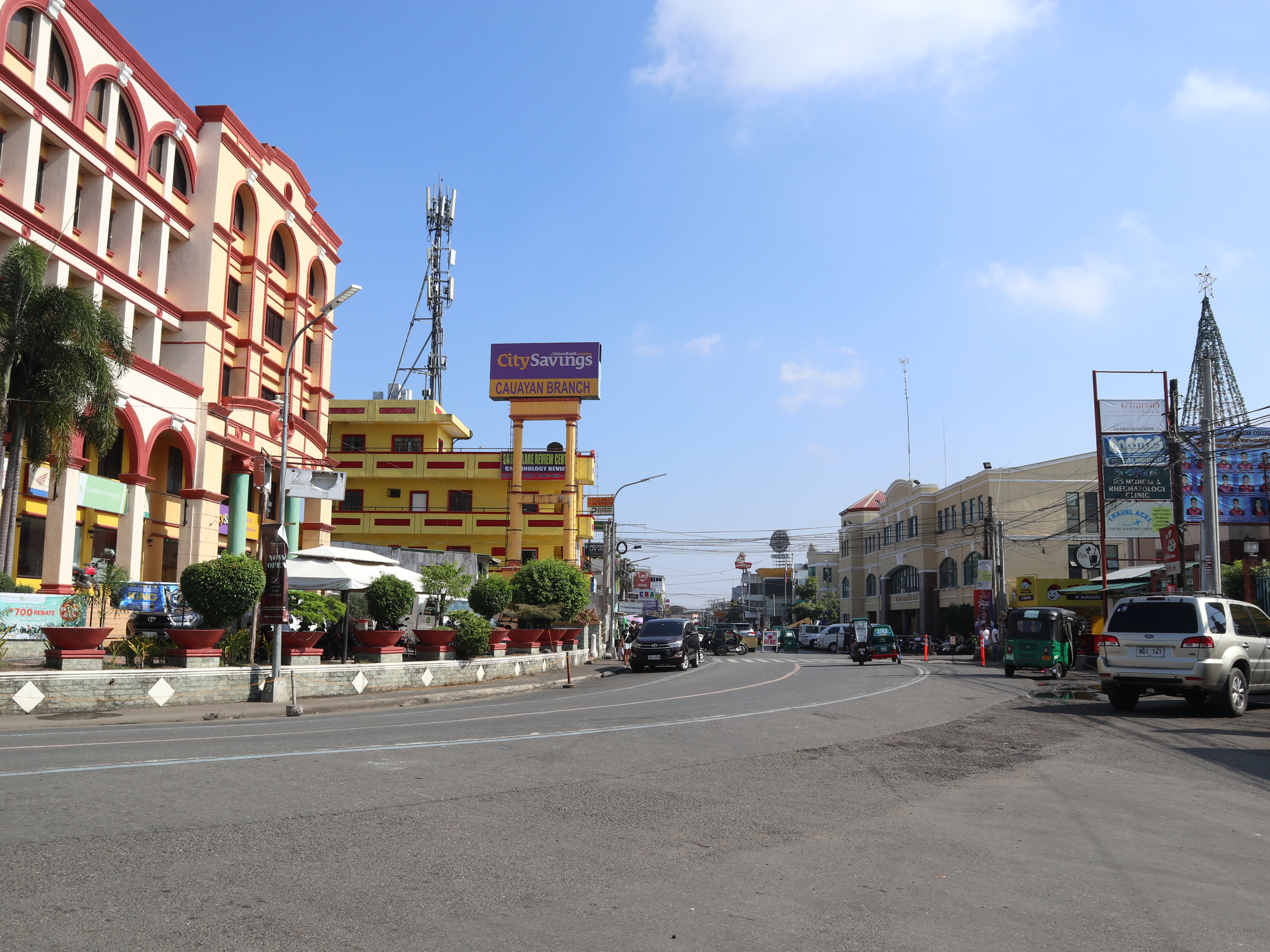
- Rizal Street in Cauayan Poblacion

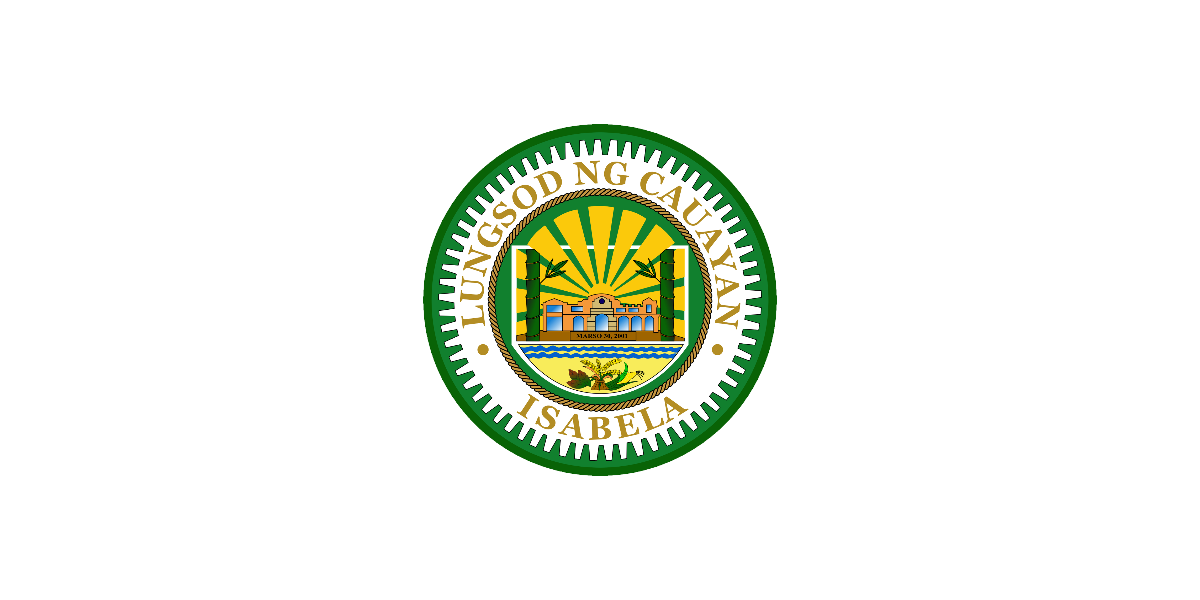
- Flag Seal
- Etymology: Bamboo
- Nicknames: Mushroom City of the North; Ideal City of the North; The First Smarter City in the Philippines
- Motto: Oh, Cauayan
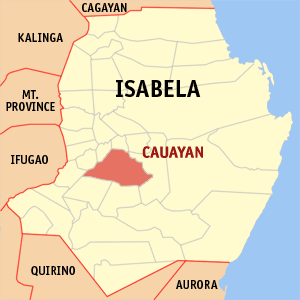
- Map of Isabela with Cauayan highlighted
- Interactive map of Cauayan
- Location within the Philippines
- Coordinates: 16°46′N 121°47′E
- Country: Philippines
- Region: Cagayan Valley
- Province: Isabela
- District: 6th district
- Founded: 1740
- Cityhood: March 30, 2001
- Barangays: 65 (see Barangays)

Government
  - Type: Sangguniang Panlungsod
  - Mayor: Caesar Dy Jr.
  - Vice Mayor: Leoncio Dalin Jr.
  - Representative: Faustino Dy III
  - City Council: Members: Cynthia Q. Uy; Garry G. Galutera; Edgar M. de Luna; Edgardo A. Atienza Jr.; Telesforo R. Mallillin; Reynaldo Q. Uy; Paul Vincent R. Mauricio; Bagnos R. Maximo Jr.; Danilo B. Asirit; Rufino C. Arcega
  - Electorate: 93,785 voters (2025)

Area
  - Total: 336.40 km^{2} (129.88 sq mi)
- Elevation: 65 m (213 ft)
- Highest elevation: 148 m (486 ft)
- Lowest elevation: 32 m (105 ft)

Population (2024 census)
  - Total: 143,539
  - Density: 426.69/km^{2} (1,105.1/sq mi)
  - Households: 36,399

Economy
  - Income class: 2nd city income class
  - Poverty incidence: 11.71% (2023)
  - Revenue: ₱ 1,512 million (2024)
  - Assets: ₱ 3,634 million (2024)
  - Expenditure: ₱ 1,534 million (2024)
  - Liabilities: ₱ 2,364 million (2024)

Service provider
  - Electricity: Isabela 1 Electric Cooperative (ISELCO 1)
- Time zone: UTC+8 (PST)
- ZIP code: 3305
- PSGC: 0203108000
- IDD : area code: +63 (0)78
- Native languages: Ilocano; Gaddang; Tagalog
- Website: cityofcauayan.gov.ph

Cauayan, officially the City of Cauayan (Ibanag: Siyudad nat Cauayan; Gaddang: Siyudad na Cauayan; Ilocano: Siudad ti Cauayan; Filipino: Lungsod ng Cauayan), is a component city in the province of Isabela, Philippines. According to the 2024 census, it has a population of 143,539 people.

== Etymology ==
Cauayan derives its name from the word Cawayan meaning bamboo or bulo in the Ilocano language, which was spoken by the early settlers of the area. Local aural history suggests that early Spaniards reached the place and found abundant bamboo trees along creeks that circled the town sites of Bulod, Sipat, Bungkol, and Marabulig creeks where a few families lived - and so that became the name of the area. It was also a common to see crocodiles basking under the cluster of bamboo along the creeks in the early morning sun.

An alternative version of how the town was named is also told. One day the miraculous image of the Blessed Virgin Mary disappeared. For many weeks, a tireless search was undertaken but it was nowhere to be found. Then one day in October the image was found among the bamboo groves. Not a single sign of mishandling or damage was detected on the image.

== History ==
=== Establishment ===
The original inhabitants (as recorded by the Dominican vicar of Ilagan, Father dela Torre, who explored the area in 1736) were Gaddang. Cauayan town was once a part of the province of Cagayan.

Founded in 1740, Cauayan antedates the establishment of Isabela by 116 years. The town site was first located in a place called Calanusian along the Cagayan River. After a series of disastrous floods, the town site was moved to its present location.

When Nueva Vizcaya was created as a province in 1839, Cauayan was transferred to it.

On May 1, 1856, the province of Isabela was created by a Royal Decree, Cauayan was again administratively transferred, this time to Isabela.

Cauayan used to be a big municipality in terms of land area. With the creation of the neighboring municipalities of Luna (Antatet) Cabatuan, Reina Mercedes (Callering), Aurora and San Mateo, however, the land area was reduced to about 336.40 square kilometers.

=== Cityhood ===
On February 28, 2001, Republic Act 9017 was signed by then President Gloria Macapagal Arroyo, converting Cauayan into a component city. It was ratified on March 30 of that year, after the voters voted in favor of cityhood.

=== Redistricting ===
Cauayan is part of the 6th district while being surrounded by towns in the 2nd (Reina Mercedes, Naguilian, Benito Soliven and San Mariano), 3rd (Angadanan, Alicia, San Mateo and Cabatuan), 5th (Luna) districts, and 6th (San Guillermo) districts.

== Geography ==
Cauayan is centrally located in the province and in the entire stretch out of Cagayan Valley. It is situated 33.98 kilometres (21.11 mi) from the provincial capital Ilagan, and 404.50 kilometres (251.34 mi) from the country's capital city of Manila.

=== Barangays ===
Cauayan is politically subdivided into 65 barangays. Each barangay consists of puroks while some have sitios.

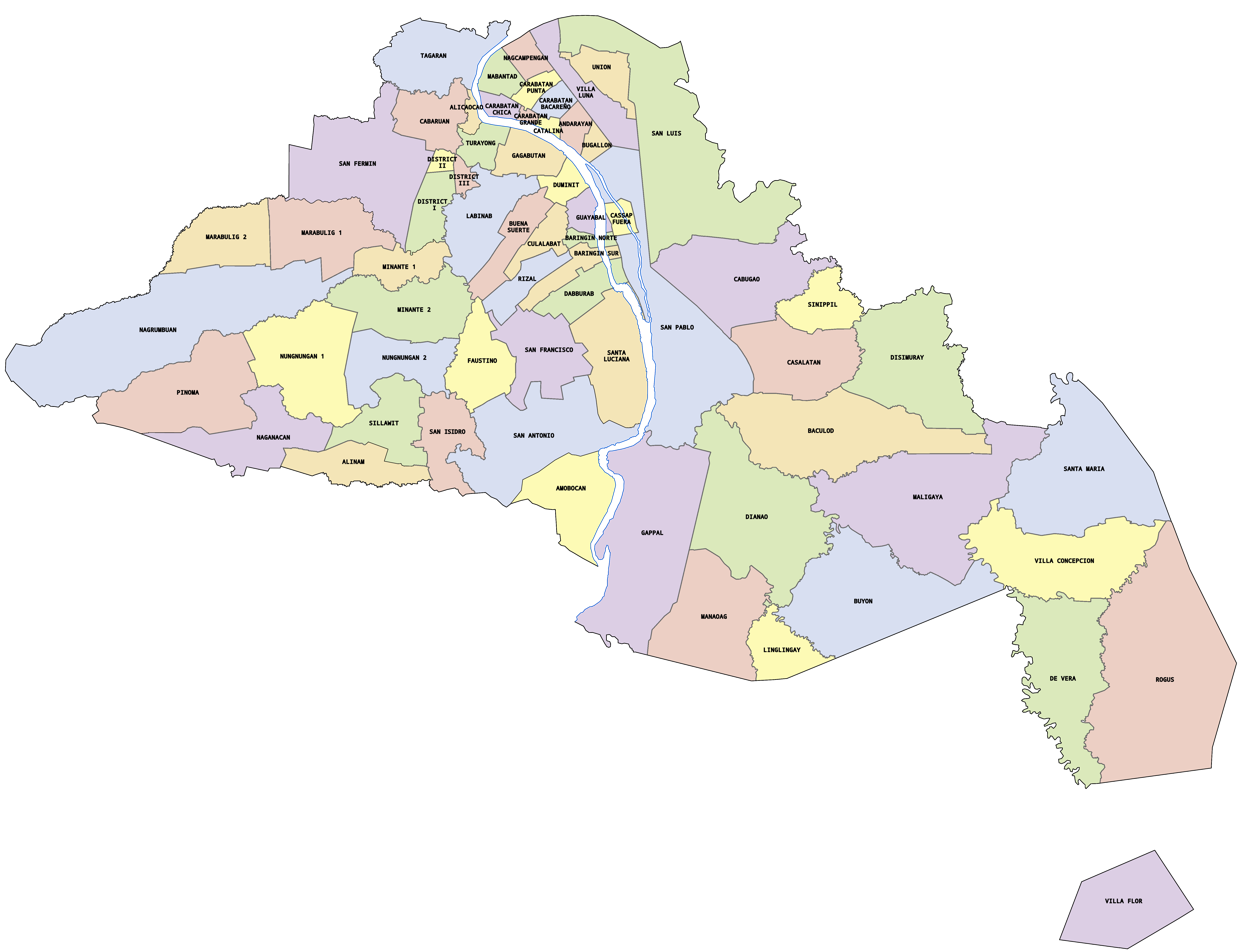
Political Subdivisions of Cauayan City

There are 14 barangays that are considered urban (highlighted in bold).

- **Alicaocao (Poblacion)**
- Alinam
- Amobocan
- Andarayan
- Baculod
- Baringin Norte
- Baringin Sur
- Buena Suerte
- Bugallon
- Buyon
- **Cabaruan (Poblacion)**
- Cabugao
- Carabatan Chica
- Carabatan Grande
- Carabatan Punta
- Carabatan Bacareño
- Casalatan
- Cassap Fuera
- Catalina
- Culalabat
- Dabburab
- De Vera
- Dianao
- Disimuray
- **District I (Poblacion)**
- **District II (Poblacion)**
- **District III (Poblacion)**
- Duminit
- Faustino (Sipay)
- Gagabutan
- Gappal
- Guayabal
- Labinab
- Linglingay
- Mabantad
- Maligaya
- Manaoag
- **Marabulig I**
- Marabulig II
- **Minante I**
- **Minante II**
- Nagcampegan
- Naganacan
- Nagrumbuan
- Nungnungan I
- Nungnungan II
- Pinoma
- Rizal
- Rogus
- San Antonio
- **San Fermin (Poblacion)**
- San Francisco
- **San Isidro**
- San Luis
- **San Pablo (Casap Hacienda)**
- Santa Luciana (Daburab 2)
- Santa Maria
- **Sillawit**
- Sinippil
- **Tagaran (Poblacion)**
- **Turayong (Poblacion)**
- Union
- Villa Luna
- Villa Concepcion
- Villa Flor

=== Climate ===
Climate data for Cauayan
Month	Jan	Feb	Mar	Apr	May	Jun	Jul	Aug	Sep	Oct	Nov	Dec	Year
Mean daily maximum °C (°F)	29 (84)	30 (86)	32 (90)	35 (95)	36 (97)	35 (95)	34 (93)	33 (91)	32 (90)	31 (88)	30 (86)	28 (82)	32 (90)
Mean daily minimum °C (°F)	19 (66)	20 (68)	21 (70)	23 (73)	24 (75)	24 (75)	23 (73)	23 (73)	23 (73)	22 (72)	21 (70)	20 (68)	22 (71)
Average precipitation mm (inches)	31.2 (1.23)	23 (0.9)	27.7 (1.09)	28.1 (1.11)	113.5 (4.47)	141.4 (5.57)	176.4 (6.94)	236.6 (9.31)	224.9 (8.85)	247.7 (9.75)	222.9 (8.78)	178 (7.0)	1,651.4 (65)
Average rainy days	10	6	5	5	13	12	15	15	15	17	16	15	144
Source: World Weather Online (modeled/calculated data, not measured locally)

== Demographics ==
Population census of Cauayan
Year	Pop.	±% p.a.
1903	3,954	—
1918	10,083	+6.44%
1939	17,418	+2.64%
1948	20,486	+1.82%
1960	25,744	+1.92%
1970	40,732	+4.69%
1975	47,235	+3.02%
1980	62,224	+5.66%
1990	83,591	+3.00%
1995	92,677	+1.95%
2000	103,952	+2.49%
2007	114,254	+1.31%
2010	122,335	+2.52%
2015	129,523	+1.09%
2020	143,403	+2.17%
2024	143,539	+0.02%
Source: Philippine Statistics Authority

In the 2024 census, the population of Cauayan was 143,539 people, with a density of 430 inhabitants per square kilometre or 1,100 inhabitants per square mile.

=== Languages ===
Cauayan is dominated by Ilocano and Gaddang speakers. English, being one of the official languages is used primarily in communication for government publications, local newsprints, road signs, commercial signs and in doing official business transactions. Tagalog, another official language and is also considered the national language is used as verbal communication channel among residents.

== Economy ==
Poverty incidence of Cauayan (%)

Source: Philippine Statistics Authority

Cauayan is a third class city in the province of Isabela. Cauayan has been selected to host the Proposed Isabela Special Economic Zone and the Regional Agro-Industrial Growth Center. As of 2016, there are over 3,418 registered business establishments that include distributors, wholesalers and retailers.

=== Agriculture ===
Cauayan city is a surplus producer of rice and corn. A total of 24,004 hectares or 69.9% hectares is utilized for palay (rice) production and corn production. Average yield per hectare per cropping is 4.5 MT for rice and corn. Corn farmers in the city are also shifting to cassava farming due to huge losses brought about by the effects of climate change in the province of Isabela. Other products include livestock and poultry, fruits and vegetables, and fishery products such as hito (cat fish) and tilapia. The National Irrigation Administration has an office in the city.

=== Banking and finance ===
As of 31 December 2021, Cauayan has a total of 34 banks, with a total volume of bank deposits at Php 27.5 billion. There are five banks based in the city namely FICO Bank (First Isabela Cooperative Bank), Rural Bank of Cauayan, North Pacific Banking Corp., Common Wealth Rural Bank Inc., and Golden Rural Bank of the Philippines. The largest of the five is FICO Bank with 39 branches in Region 1, 2, 3 & CAR, and second is Rural Bank of Cauayan with 19 branches all within the Cagayan Valley.

=== Commerce ===
In 2014, SM Prime opened its 49th mall in the country, SM City Cauayan which is the first SM Supermall in Cagayan Valley region. It also hosts stores from international and local brands, giving Cauayan and other neighboring towns and cities the opportunity to experience high-end shopping. Multi-national fast-food chains also have branches within the city. Puregold, a large retail chain in the Philippines, is currently operating two supermarkets in Cauayan.

Homegrown local shopping centers include Talavera Hypermart and Primark Town Center Cauayan, which opened in June 2016, has continued to take a significant part of the local commerce industry.

== Culture ==
Gawagaway-yan Festival of Cauayan is a celebration of the city's bountiful livelihood and merriment for the ethno-linguistic groups residing in Cauayan. It also traces and gives due recognition to the ancestry of Cauayenos from the ethno linguistic group called Gaddang and recognizes the diversity of the cultural groups residing in Cauayan through streetdancing, float parade and other indigenous activities.

Cauayan traces its roots to the people of Gaddang, whom the city celebrates during the annual festival of Gawagaway-yan. This celebration features a street dance competition, a float parade and assorted activities that different ethno-linguistic groups participate in.

The city was once tobacco land, and there are still reminders of this past at the Old Tabacalera Warehouse, known as Compania General de Tabacos de Filipinas during the Spanish period. This local tobacco industry was a massive enterprise going all the way back to 1881, when it started supplying the Tobacco Monopoly of the Spanish government. The old Tabacalera Warehouse is part of Hacienda San Luis, an eco-tourism park in the city.

Aside from the majestic view of Cagayan river from the 250m long and 30 ft high zip line, Hacienda San Luis is a home for cultural heritage. Museo San Luis features how tobaccos are made for the Manila-Acapulco galleon trade. It also showcases sculptures of St. Luis (Louis) and several masterpieces.

== Government ==
=== Local government ===
As a component city in the Province of Isabela, government officials at the provincial and city levels are voted by the town. The provincial government has political jurisdiction over most local transactions of the city government.

The city of Cauayan is governed by a mayor, designated as its local chief executive, and by a city council as its legislative body in accordance with the Local Government Code. The mayor, vice mayor, and the city councilors are elected directly by the people through an election held every three years.

Barangays are also headed by elected officials: Barangay Captain, Barangay Council, whose members are called Barangay Councilors. The barangays have SK federation which represents the barangay, headed by SK chairperson and whose members are called SK councilors. All officials are also elected every three years.

=== Elected officials ===
Members of the Cauayan City Council (2022–2025)
Position	Name
District Representative (6th Legislative District the Province of Isabela)	Faustino A. Dy V
Chief Executive of the City of Cauayan	Caesar S. Dy Jr.
Presiding Officer of the City Council of Cauayan	Vice Mayor Leoncio A. Dalin Jr.
Councilors of the City of Cauayan	Edgardo A. Atienza Jr.
Councilors of the City of Cauayan	Cynthia Q. Uy-Balayan
Councilors of the City of Cauayan	Ariel Kenneth V. Uy
Councilors of the City of Cauayan	Eugenio C. Asirit IV
Councilors of the City of Cauayan	Edgar M. De Luna
Councilors of the City of Cauayan	Garry G. Galutera
Councilors of the City of Cauayan	Telesforo R. Mallillin
Councilors of the City of Cauayan	Paul Vincent R. Mauricio
Councilors of the City of Cauayan	Paolo Eleazar Delmendo
Councilors of the City of Cauayan	Bagnos R. Maximo Jr.

=== Congress representation ===
Cauayan, as a component city, belongs to the sixth legislative district of the province of Isabela, being represented by Faustino A. Dy V.

== Infrastructure ==
In Cauayan, there is a difference in the adequacy of infrastructure facilities in urban and rural areas. Generally, the closer the area is to the main service center of the city, i.e. the Poblacion, the better are the facilities for production and distribution of goods and services. The analysis in this sector is based on the existing infrastructure facilities and those considered in the pipeline for 2002–2006 implementation. No projects are as yet programmed beyond 2006 in higher levels of government.

=== Public Transport ===
The existing infrastructure Provision for Transport of Cauayan is shown in Table 41. The city has a total of 512.27 kilometers of roads. Roads are classified into national, provincial, municipal/city and barangay roads including NIA access roads. All the 18.16 kilometers of national roads are concrete roads while more than two-thirds of the 42.904 kilometers of Provincial roads are graveled and 17.86 kilometers of city roads are concrete roads, about 97.40% or 340.16 kilometers of barangay roads are gravel roads while the 56.40 kilometers of NIA access road is only 2.22% concrete. By type of pavement, the total of 512.27 kilometers of roads in the city, only 12.37% or 63.322 kilometers is concrete and 87.68% is graveled accounting to 448.948 kilometers. However, all settlement areas are provided with roads.

=== Roads ===
The national roads allow the operation of various bus and jeepney operators in the City of Cauayan and neighboring towns and areas to transport passengers and cargo to any point of Luzon, making the City of Cauayan one of the transport pivotal points in the Cagayan Valley.

The 18.16 kilometers of national roads in the City of Cauayan provide mobility and access to the neighboring towns, provinces and regions. This road is the Cagayan Valley Road (CVR). The CVR is the Cagayan Valley section of the Philippine-Japan Friendship Highway, also known as the Maharlika Highway.

The CVR from Alinam to Tagaran is the city's longest stretch of concrete road. This road links the City of Cauayan to the rest of the region, to Region 03 and National Capital Region in the south and to Region 01 in the north.

The proposed Cauayan Diversion Roads include the Minante I- Marabulig-I – Dadap (Mun. of Luna) – San Fermin – Tagaran with an approximate length of 12..5 kilometers; the Alicaocao – Turayong – District II – Labinab – District I – Minante I Diversion Road (4.8 km); and the San Fermin – Tagaran via CRAIGC (4.2 km) These Diversion Roads when constructed will improve the settlements, the movement of goods and services and even the flow of traffic in the city. The estimated construction cost for these three projects will reach PhP 119.5 million including drainage and 4 bridges.

Of the 59.66 kilometers of provincial roads, only 28.09% or 16.756 kilometers are concrete and the rest are all gravel roads constituting 42.904 kilometers accounting to about 71.91%.

Approximately 61.3% of city streets or 17.860 kilometers are concrete while 38.70% or 10.950 kilometers are gravel roads. In order for business to flourish in the poblacion, all city streets need to be concreted within the plan period.

Of the total 512.27 kilometers of roads within Cauayan, about 11.01% or an aggregate length of 56.40 kilometers is NIA access roads constructed and maintained by the National Irrigation Administration (NIA). However, in 1997, NIA turned over these roads to the city government for maintenance.

The barangay roads are important as they provide mobility and access in the settlement areas. With each new settlement area, barangay roads are initiated with private homeowners’ efforts, provided the road is donated to the government, for concreting and maintenance. The government later on augments the private road development.

Barangay roads totals 349.24 kilometers or 68.17% of the total 512.27 kilometers of roads in the city. Of this length, 97.40% or 340.16 kilometers are graveled. Only about 9.080 kilometers or 2.60% are concrete.

The provision of heavy equipment necessary in the construction and maintenance of roads and other infrastructure facilities and utilities is of high importance in order for the city government to enhance mobility thereby increasing productivity.

=== Road Density ===
The standards for road provision are 2.40 kilometers for every 1,000 urban population and 1.50 kilometers for every 100 hectares of arable land in the rural areas. Presently, the rural road density (km/km^{2}) is placed at 1.52 topping the list in the entire province in terms of rural road density. With 35.575 kilometers of roads in the 5 barangays with a CY 2000 population of 31,037, the city of Cauayan has an urban road density of only 0.872 kilometers per 1,000 urban populations. Additional roads must be constructed in the poblacion to hasten development. On the other hand, it has 313.665 kilometers in the 60 rural barangays with 23,501.21 hectares of arable land. This means a road density of only 1.33 kilometers for every 100 hectares of arable lands in the rural barangays. This implies that more roads have to be constructed in the rural barangays to fully support socio-economic development.

=== Bridges ===
The city's road network includes 20 permanent bridges, 6 of which are reinforced concrete deck girder (RCDG) bridges. Thirteen concrete overflow bridges and one steel bridge account for a total aggregate length of 431.5 lineal meters. Two RCDG bridges along the Maharlika highway have recently been replaced under the Tulay ng Pangulo Program of then-President Fidel Ramos and were inaugurated in 1999 by no less than President Joseph Estrada. However, the Alicaocao Overflow Bridge spanning 66 meters was hit by a disastrous flood in 1998, causing the bridge to collapse, particularly at the Carabatan Chica portion. Replacement of the said bridge is crucial to the development of the other side of the Cagayan River since this is the only route going to that place, except when you take Naguilian Bridge via Minanga in the municipality of Naguilian, which is a tormentous stretch aside from causing delay. Several overflow bridges within the city also need immediate replacement, and around 16 bridges and 18 RCCP culverts need to be constructed/replaced in order to make the city's road network system efficient.

Currently, two bridges are under construction to divert the Alicaocao Overflow Bridge: the Santa Luciana-San Pablo Bridge (also called the Gov BGDy Bridge), which spans barangays Santa Luciana to San Pablo to connect Southern Cauayan, and the Mabantad-Cabaruan Bridge (also called the Gov. FND Bridge or the New Alicaocao Bridge), which spans barangays Mabantad to Cabaruan to connect Northern Cauayan.

=== Terminals ===
Cauayan road network is supported with privately owned terminals for jeeps and buses located at Barangay San Fermin. SM City Cauayan has built a terminal beside the mall to support the public transportation in/out of the Cauayan.

=== Bus Companies ===
- Victory Liner
- Dalin Liner

An inter-provincial bus terminal with an estimated cost of PHP 70.00 million needs to be constructed in this rapidly urbanizing city to improve the effectiveness and efficiency of the city's transportation system and to provide additional prime commercial area and needed tourism support services.

=== Airport ===
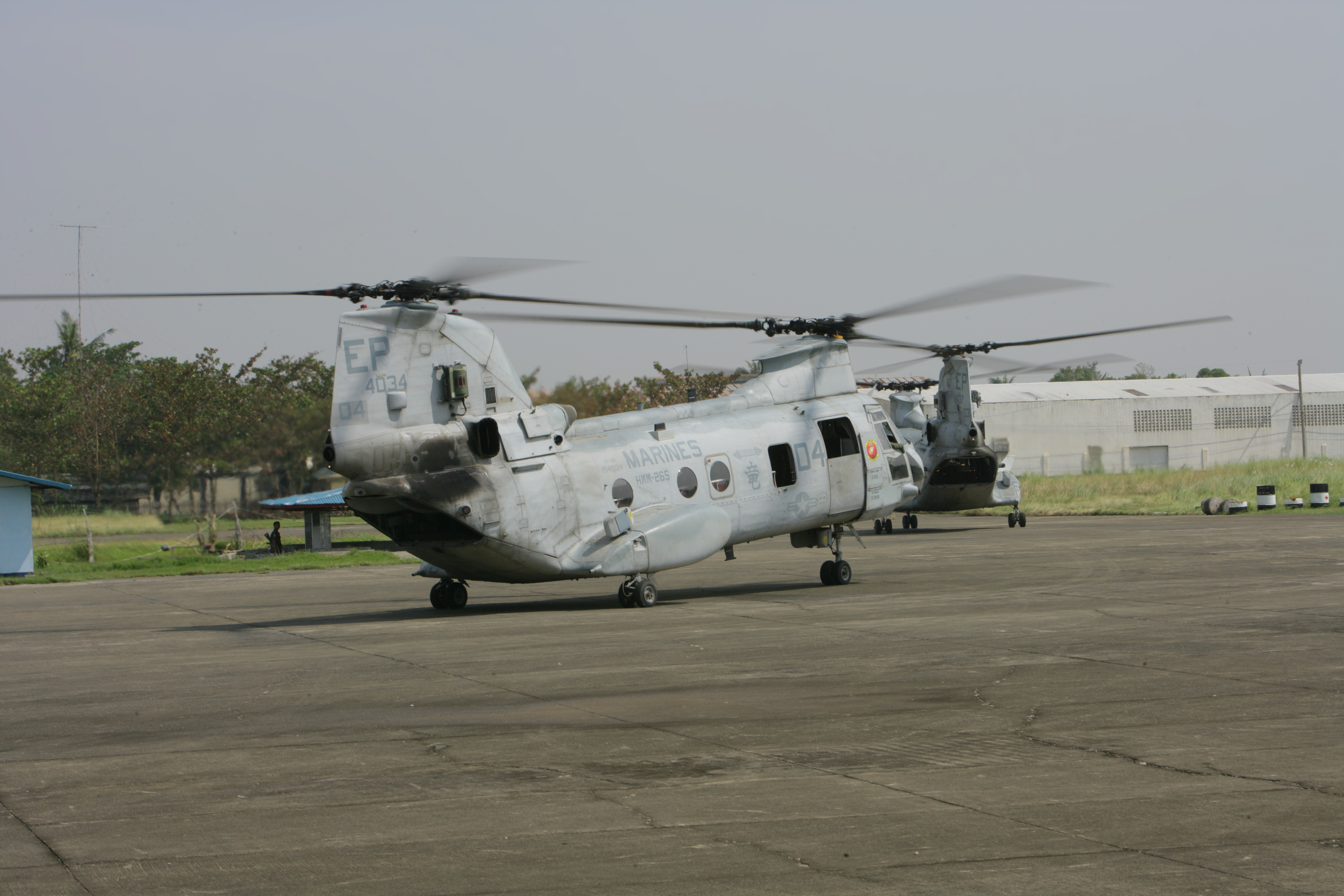
Cauayan Airport

The city airport located at Barangay San Fermin completes the infrastructure provision for transport for the city of Cauayan with provincial and regional impact. It is a secondary airport as per BAT classification. The airport runway has a total length of 2,500 meters and 30 meters wide capable of accommodating Boeing 737s. It is equipped with VHF Omni Range Transmitter, VHF Air/Ground single band radio and provided with fire-fighting equipment and facilities. It is likewise provided with facilities for arriving and departing passengers. The entire airport facility is provided with a perimeter fence.

At present, the facility is undergoing upgrading of facilities intended to accommodate international cargo flights. When completed, it is also expected that normal operations of the Philippine Airlines will resume. This is very timely since Cauayan has been selected to host the Proposed Isabela Special Economic Zone and the Regional Agro-Industrial Growth Center.

Cebu Pacific Air fly in Cauayan daily utilizing an Airbus A320 aircraft with Flight No. 5J 196 departing from Manila and Flight No. 5J 197 departing from Cauayan.

=== Telecommunication ===
The PLDT provides fixed line services. Wireless mobile communications services are provided by Smart Communications and Globe Telecommunications. Dito Telecommunity is now available offering connectivity service. Philpost, LBC, JRS Express, FedEx, DCI Express, and EXL Express move mails. Broadcast media is provided by radio and TV stations operating in the city, a cable TV facility while a number of Internet Café have established their operations here. Nowadays, the most important means of communication with relatives and friends is thru internet. This was being provided by the NSCV internet connections plus the Converge, PLDT Home and SmartBro broadband. The LGU likewise is utilizing handheld radio transceivers covering all barangays in city and the province as well with bases at the city hall, city police and fire protection offices.

== Healthcare ==
The health needs of the city is served by a district hospital and 7 private hospitals; 2 city health units, 22 BHS, a puericulture center, 37 private medical clinics, 15 private dental clinics, a rehabilitation center for the disabled, and the Cauayan Microscopy Center. These medical facilities has a total of 255 beds. Health personnel includes 41 medical doctors, 16 dentist, 74 nurses, 84 midwives, 10 medical technicians, 7 sanitary inspectors, 7 paramedics, 250 Barangay Health Workers and 148 Community Volunteer Health Workers both in the public and private sector.

== Education ==
The Schools Division Office of Cauayan governs the city's public education system. The division office is a field office of the DepEd in Cagayan Valley region. The office governs the 64 public and 14 private elementary and eight public and seven private high schools throughout the city.

=== Secondary schools ===
- Cauayan City National High School (Main)
- Cauayan City National High School Annex
- Cauayan City Science & Technology HS
- Cauayan City Stand-Alone Senior High School
- Centro De Cultura School
- Children of Lourdes Academy
- Christian Learning Center
- Gappal National High School
- Isabela Colleges Incorporated
- Linglingay High School
- Merry Sunshine Montessori School
- Metropolitan Bible Baptist Learning Center
- Nansing School
- Our Lady of the Pillar College - Cauayan, Inc.
- Pinoma National High School
- San Antonio National High School
- Sillawit National High School
- St. Clare Elementary School
- St. Xavier Montessori School
- United Shepherd Integrated School
- University of Perpetual Help System
- Villa Concepcion High School - Rogus Extension
- Villa Conception National High School
- West Tabacal Region National High School

=== Higher educational institutions ===
There are also two universities and four private colleges being governed by TESDA and CHED.

- College of Business Education Science and Technology
- East Asia International System College
- Isabela College of Arts and Technology (Marine School)
- Isabela Colleges Incorporated
- Isabela State University
- National Police College Regional Training School
- Our Lady of the Pillar College - Cauayan, Inc.
- Saint Clare College of Region 2
- STI College
- University of Perpetual Help System

== Persona non grata ==
- NPA
